= List of sports figures considered the greatest =

In sports, spectators including sports fandom and sportswriters, as well as participants themselves have discussed players, coaches, teams, and related personalities in regards to being the greatest in their field, or sometimes across sports. These discussions on the greatest of all-time—often referred to by the acronym "GOAT"—are often held in sports culture, but widespread consensus on a sport's "GOAT" is uncommon.

Team sports in particular have GOAT discussions compartmentalized by position.

== List of sports players considered the greatest ==
=== General ===
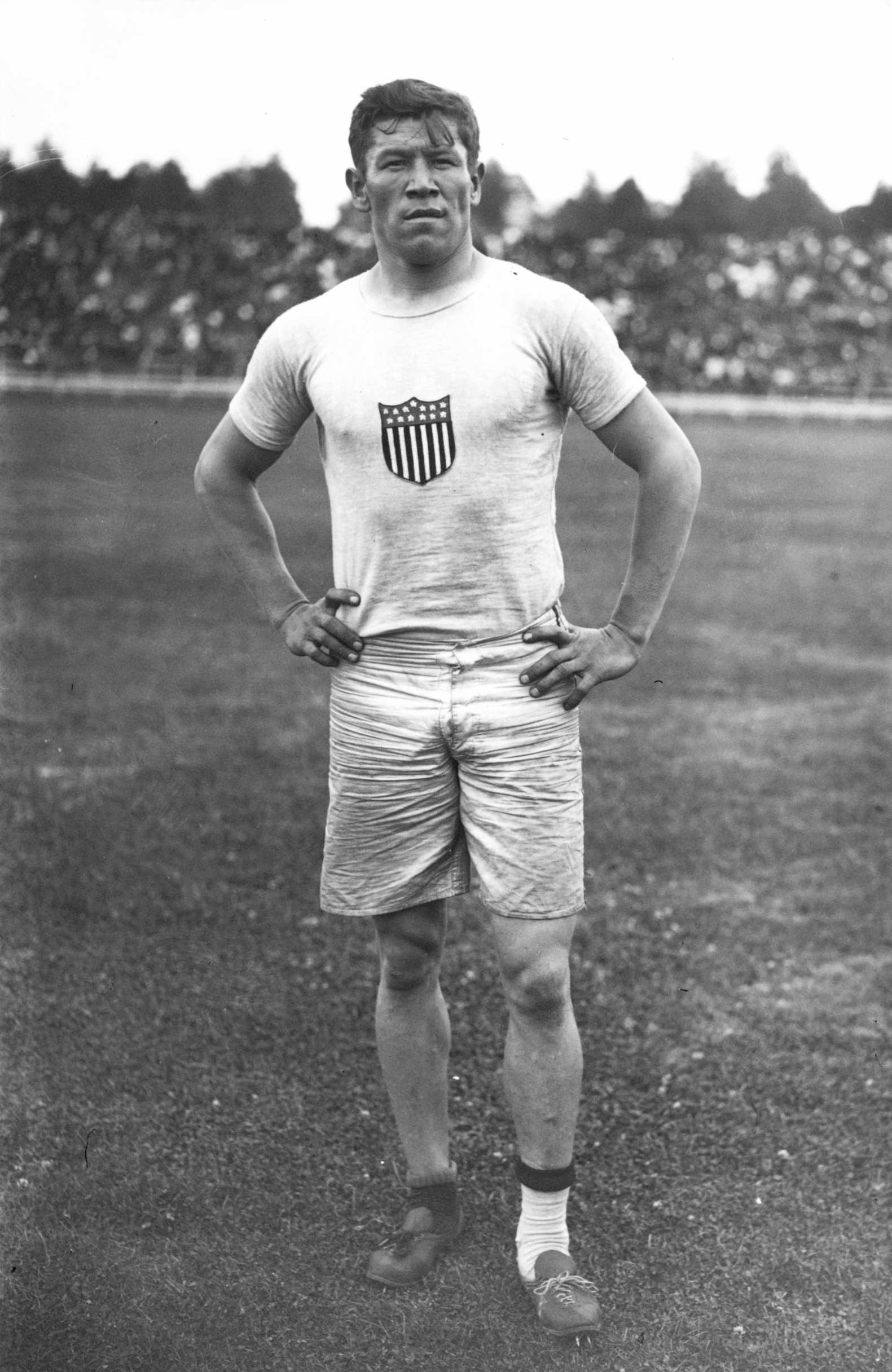
Jim Thorpe

List of athletes considered the greatest
Sport	Player	Sources
All sports (general)	(United States) Muhammad Ali	
All sports (general)	(Jamaica) Usain Bolt	
All sports (general)	(Switzerland) Roger Federer	
All sports (general)	(Canada) Wayne Gretzky	
All sports (general)	(United States) Michael Jordan	
All sports (general)	(Argentina) Lionel Messi	
All sports (general)	(Brazil) Pelé	
All sports (general)	(United States) Babe Ruth	
All sports (general)	(United States) Jim Thorpe	
All sports (general)	(United States) Serena Williams	

=== Athletics and racing sports ===
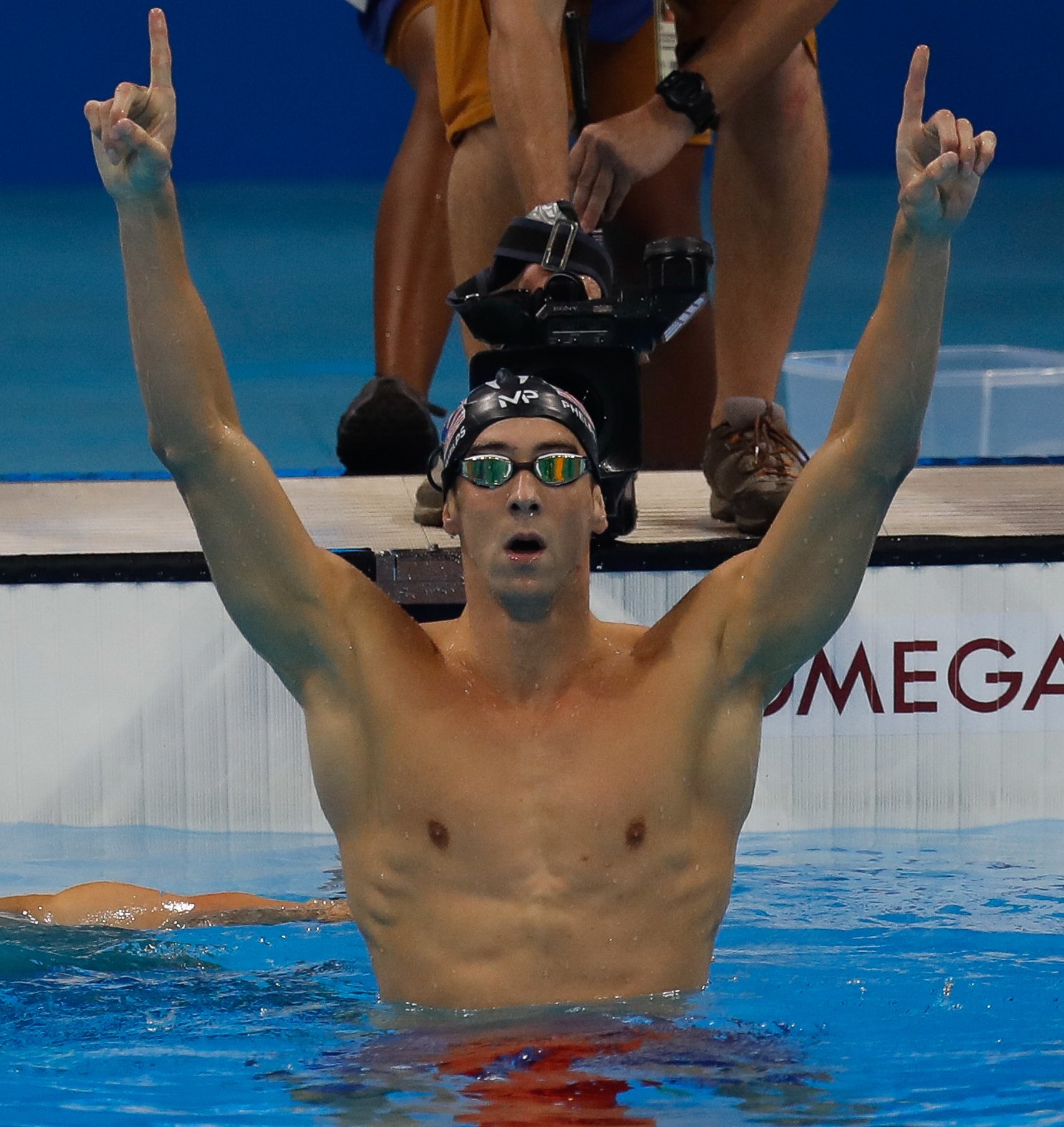
Michael Phelps

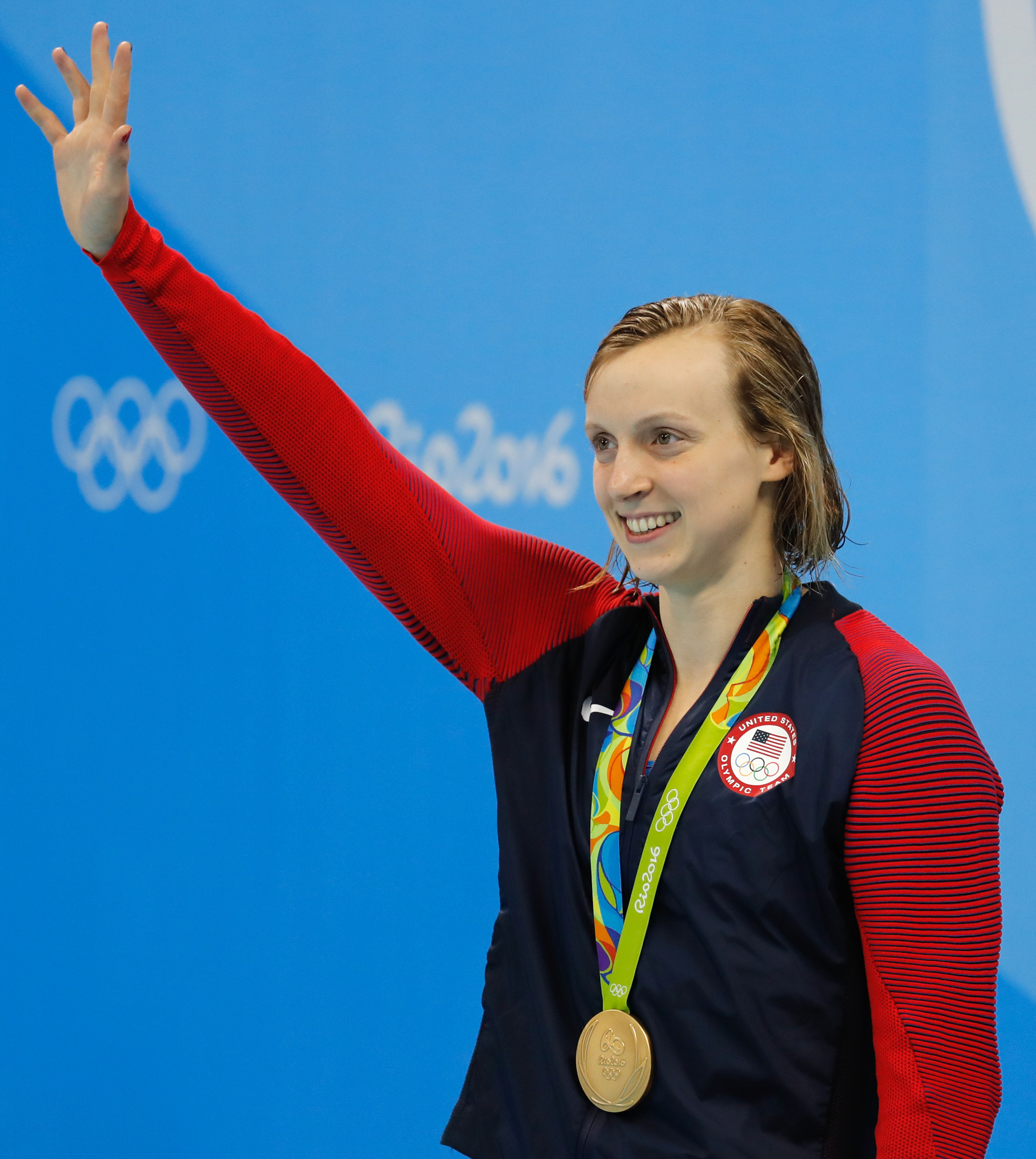
Katie Ledecky

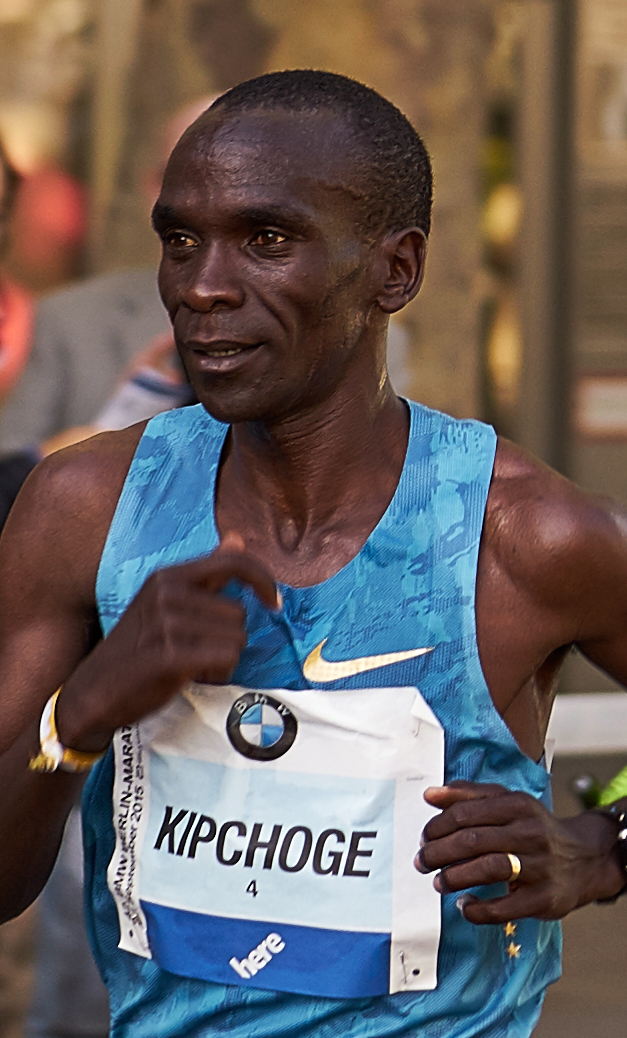
Eliud Kipchoge

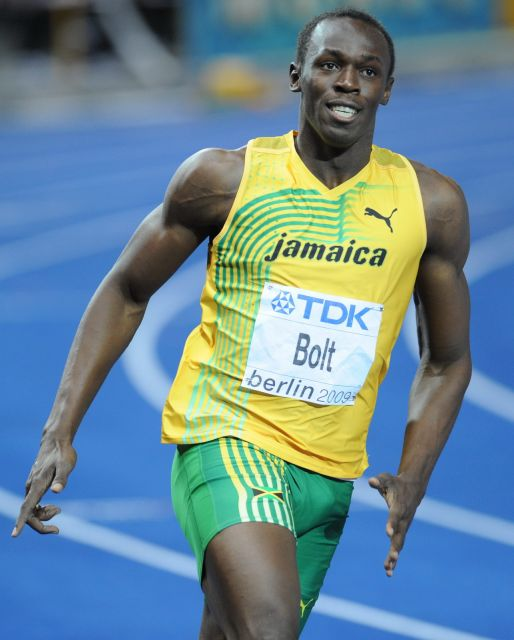
Usain Bolt

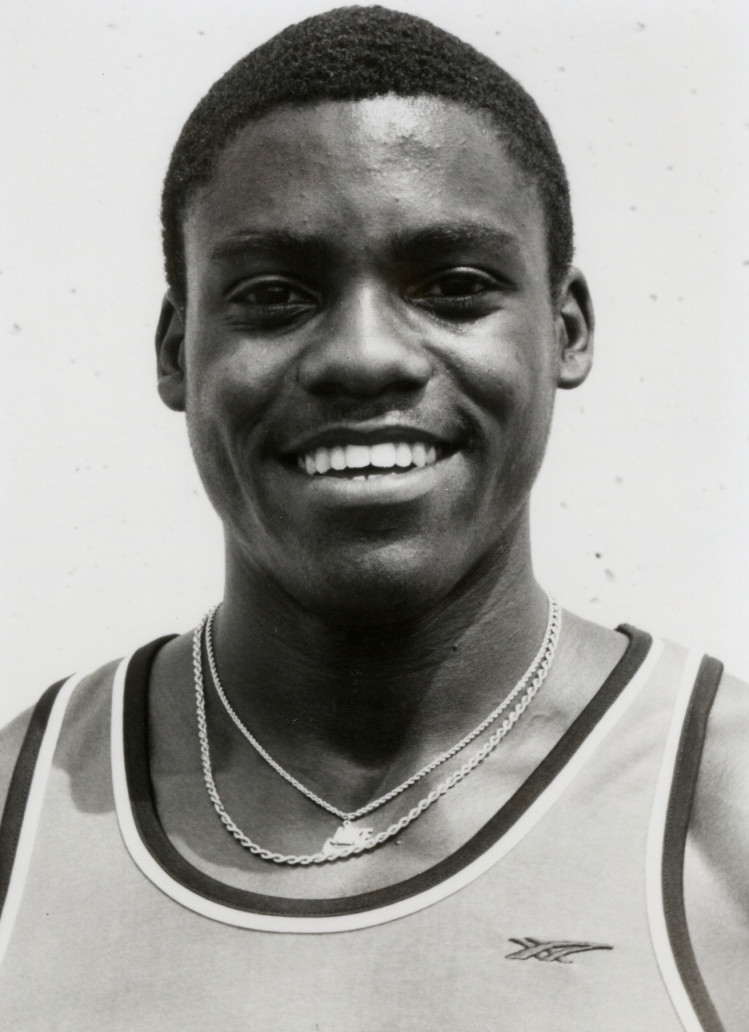
Carl Lewis

List of athletes considered the greatest
Sport	Player	Sources
Cycling	(Belgium) Eddy Merckx	(Note: Sources or lists that share such an opinion include: Olympics.com; ProCyclingStats; New York (2009); Outside magazine (2017); Velomotion (2019); Brussels Express (2019); Radio Times (2023); Cyclingnews (2025))
Formula One	(United Kingdom) Lewis Hamilton	(Note: Sources or lists that share such an opinion include: Car magazine (2020); Business Insider (2023); New Arena (2024); F1 Oversteer (2025); Autosport (2025); Al Bat (2025); DirecTV (2025))
Formula One	(Germany) Michael Schumacher	(Note: Sources or lists that share such an opinion include: OverTake (2012); The Telegraph (2016); Beyond The Flag (2018); ESPN (2020); Las Vegas Grand Prix (2024); F1.com (2025))
Formula One	(Brazil) Ayrton Senna	(Note: Sources or lists that share such an opinion include: Autosport poll of 217 fellow world championship drivers (2009); BBC Sport (2012); Grand Prix 247 (2019); MotorBiscuit (2020); The East Sider (2025))
Horse racing (Jockeys, flat racing)	(United Kingdom) Lester Piggott	(Note: Sources or lists that share such an opinion include: Racing TV; Spiked (2022); Horse & Hound (2022); Sporting Life (2022); SF Active (2024))
Horse racing (Jockeys, flat racing)	(United States) Bill Shoemaker	(Note: Sources or lists that share such an opinion include: BetCity; Chicago Tribune (1989); The Herald (2003); Los Angeles Times (2003); East Bay Times (2008); Midwestern Traveler (2020); Charlotte Stories (2022); Riding Magazine (2022))
Horse racing (Jockeys, jump racing)	(United Kingdom) Tony McCoy	(Note: Sources or lists that share such an opinion include: Planet Sport; The Mirror (2010); Belfast Telegraph (2013); Belfast Telegraph (2013); Sky News (2013); The Guardian (2015); Gazette and Herald (2016); Racing Better (2017); BBC Sport (2021); Racing Club (2024))
Horse racing (Jockeys, jump racing)	(Republic of Ireland) Ruby Walsh	(Note: Sources or lists that share such an opinion include: Horse Racing Ireland; Kildare Live (2016); The Standard (2019); The Spectator (2019))
Horse racing (Thoroughbreds, in general and flat racing)	(United Kingdom) Frankel	(Note: Sources or lists that share such an opinion include: Irish Independent (2012); World Thoroughbred Rankings (2013); Great British Racing (2021); BTX Racing (2024); RaceShare (2025); Kansas State Collegian (2025))
Horse racing (Thoroughbreds, in general and flat racing)	(United States) Man o' War	(Note: Sources or lists that share such an opinion include: Bay Area Equestrian Network (2018); Horse Network (2019); Double D Trailers (2025))
Horse racing (Thoroughbreds, in general and flat racing)	(United States) Secretariat	(Note: Sources or lists that share such an opinion include: Montjeu; The Top Tens; KSBW (2017); Bleacher Report (2018); Horse Network (2019); Daily Racing Form (2020); Stryder USA (2022); The New York Times (2023); The Spirit (2023); Equestriano.com (2023); Willowbrook Riding Centre (2025))
Horse racing (Thoroughbreds, in general and Steeplechase)	(Republic of Ireland) Arkle	(Note: Sources or lists that share such an opinion include: Horseracing.co.uk; The Guardian (2005); The Clare Champion (2011); The Times (2011); Irish Examiner (2012); Country Life (2020); Secret Ireland (2024))
MotoGP	(Italy) Giacomo Agostini	(Note: Sources or lists that share such an opinion include: MotoGP.com; Red Bull; European Safer Urban Motorcycling)
MotoGP	(Spain) Marc Márquez	(Note: Sources or lists that share such an opinion include: Diario AS (2025); La Voz de Galicia (2025); Okdiario (2025))
Motorcycle trials	(Spain) Toni Bou	(Note: Sources or lists that share such an opinion include: Top Gear (2020); FIM Awards (2021); L'Équipe (2026))
NASCAR	(United States) Dale Earnhardt	(Note: Sources or lists that share such an opinion include: Speedway Media (2013); NASCAR.com's Kenny Bruce (2015); Bleacher Report (2018); Beyond The Flag (2019); The Central Trend (2020); Modern Age (2025))
NASCAR	(United States) Jimmie Johnson	(Note: Sources or lists that share such an opinion include: Fox Sports fan poll (2016); USA Today (2019); Yahoo Sports (2019); Sportsnaut (2024); Frontstretch (2024))
NASCAR	(United States) Richard Petty	(Note: Sources or lists that share such an opinion include: WNDB; Talent Backer; Bleacher Report (2009); Glide magazine (2022); AutoRacing1 (2022); Speedway Digest (2022); The New York Times (2023); Chase Your Sport (2024))
Long-distance running (men's Marathon)	(Kenya) Eliud Kipchoge	(Note: Sources or lists that share such an opinion include: The New York Times (2018); Citius Mag (2022); Runner's World (2023); Olympics.com (2023); Tempo Journal (2023); Top10HQ (2024); ESPN (2024); CityHub (2025); Marathons.com (2025); Running Channel (2025))
Long-distance running (women's Marathon)	(United Kingdom) Paula Radcliffe	(Note: Sources or lists that share such an opinion include: Star City Games (2008); FloTrack (2015); TRI247 (2025))
Swimming (in general and men's)	(United States) Michael Phelps	(Note: Sources or lists that share such an opinion include: The Sport Digest (2016); Pledge Sports (2017); Bleacher Report (2018); KreedOn (2022); Legit News (2023); Sportsmonkie (2023); NBC Sports Olympics commentator Dan Hicks (2024); Yahoo Sports (2024))
Swimming (women's)	(United States) Katie Ledecky	(Note: Sources or lists that share such an opinion include: The Washington Post (2022); SwimSwam (readers poll 2023), (2025); The Age (2024); NBC (2024); Al Jazeera (2024); Bleacher Report (2024); Swimming World (2025))
Track and field: Decathlon	(United States) Ashton Eaton	(Note: Sources or lists that share such an opinion include: Los Angeles Times (2012); ESPN (2017))
Track and field: High jump	(Cuba) Javier Sotomayor	(Note: Sources or lists that share such an opinion include: KreedOn (2023); Guinness World Records (2026))
Track and field: Javelin throw	(Czech Republic) Jan Železný	(Note: Sources or lists that share such an opinion include: Radio Prague International (2006); Athletic Weekly (2021); Guinness World Records (2024))
Track and field: Long jump	(United States) Mike Powell	(Note: Sources or lists that share such an opinion include: KreedOn (2026); Athleta Mag (2026))
Track and field (men's): Middle-distance running	(Morocco) Hicham El Guerrouj	(Note: Sources or lists that share such an opinion include: Runner's World (2014); Canadian Running Magazine (2014); Athletics Weekly (2014))
Track and field (women's): Middle-distance running	(Kenya) Faith Kipyegon	(Note: Sources or lists that share such an opinion include: The Running Channel (2025); Runner's World (2025); The Rising Nepal (2025))
Track and field (men's): Overall	(Jamaica) Usain Bolt	(Note: Sources or lists that share such an opinion include: Herald Sun (2013); CNN (2016); ESPN (2016); SF Active (2024); Augustman (2024))
Track and field (men's): Overall	(United States) Carl Lewis	(Note: Sources or lists that share such an opinion include: Sports Illustrated (1995); ESPN Sport Science (2013); Ventura County Star (2016); Track & Field News (2019))
Track and field (men's): Overall	(United States) Jesse Owens	(Note: Sources or lists that share such an opinion include: Associated Press (1950); 500 American sports editors, writers and broadcasters polled for the "Greatest Athlete of All Time" (1976); MileSplit New York (2009); Jesuit High School Tampa (2016); Atlas Obscura (2025))
Track and field (women's): Overall	(United States) Allyson Felix	(Note: Sources or lists that share such an opinion include: Against the Odds (2014); CBS Sports (2021); Atlanta Black Star (2021); First and Pen (2022); ARCH-USA (2022))
Track and field (women's): Overall	(United States) Jackie Joyner-Kersee	(Note: Sources or lists that share such an opinion include: The New York Times (1996); Topend Sports (2011); CBS News (2015))
Track and field: Pole vault	(Sweden) Armand Duplantis	(Note: Sources or lists that share such an opinion include: Yahoo Sports (2024); The Economic Times (2025))
Track and field: Shot put	(United States) Ryan Crouser	(Note: Sources or lists that share such an opinion include: NBC Olympics (2024); The Athletic (2024); Throne (2024))
Track and field (in general and men's): Sprinting	(Jamaica) Usain Bolt	(Note: Sources or lists that share such an opinion include: Vice magazine (2016); Centre Daily Times (2016); Miami Herald (2016); Olympics.com (2016); Business Insider (2016); CBC Sports (2017); SBNation (2017); Bleacher Report (2018); The Times of India (2025))
Track and field (women's): Sprinting	(Jamaica) Shelly-Ann Fraser-Pryce	(Note: Sources or lists that share such an opinion include: The Phoenix Newspaper (2019); Pulse Sports Kenya (2025); Olympics.com (2025); Nike (2025))
Track and field: Triple jump	(United Kingdom) Jonathan Edwards	(Note: Sources or lists that share such an opinion include: KreedOn (2023); Team GB (2026))

=== Ball and hockey sports ===
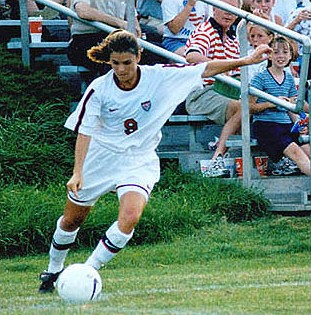
Mia Hamm

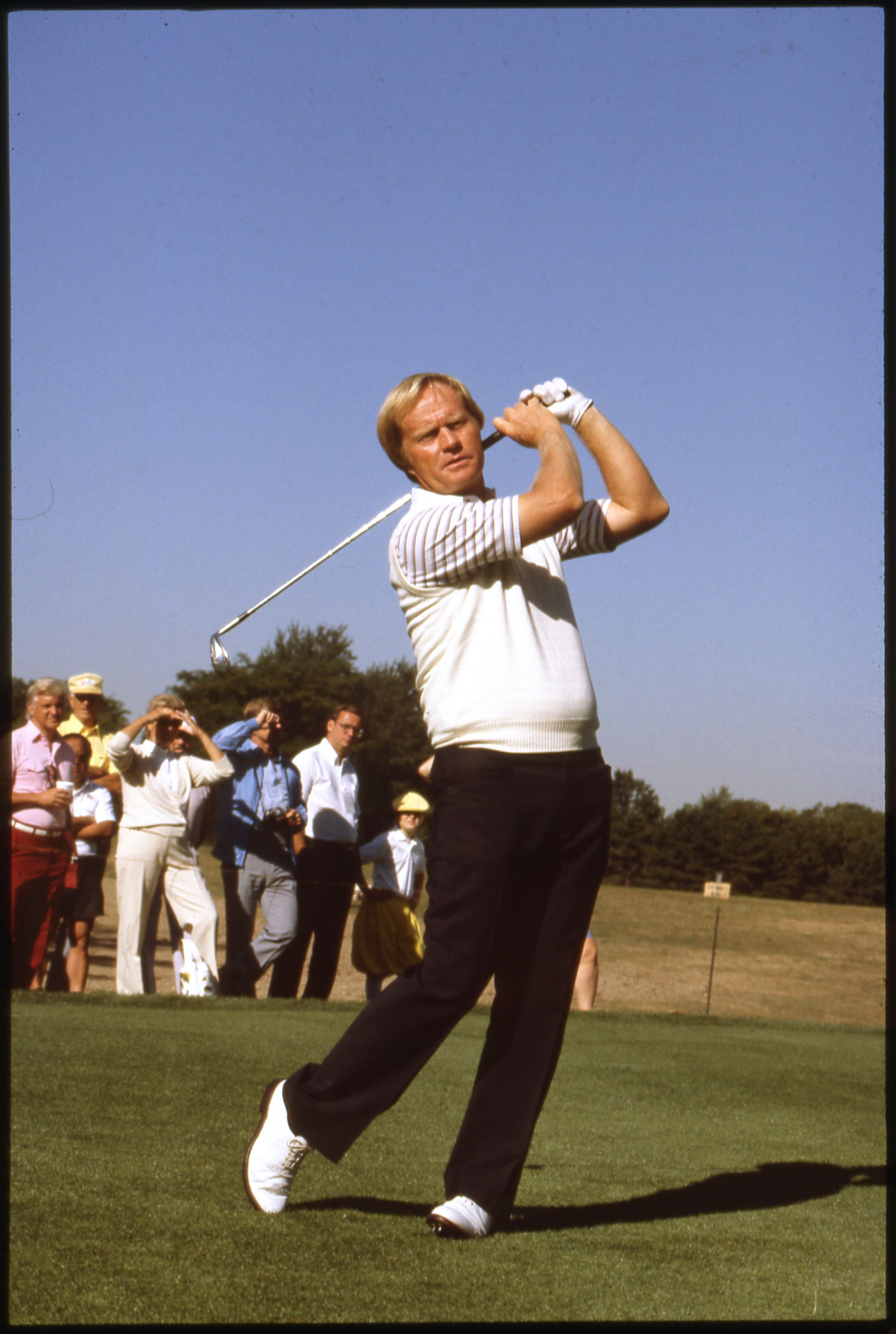
Jack Nicklaus

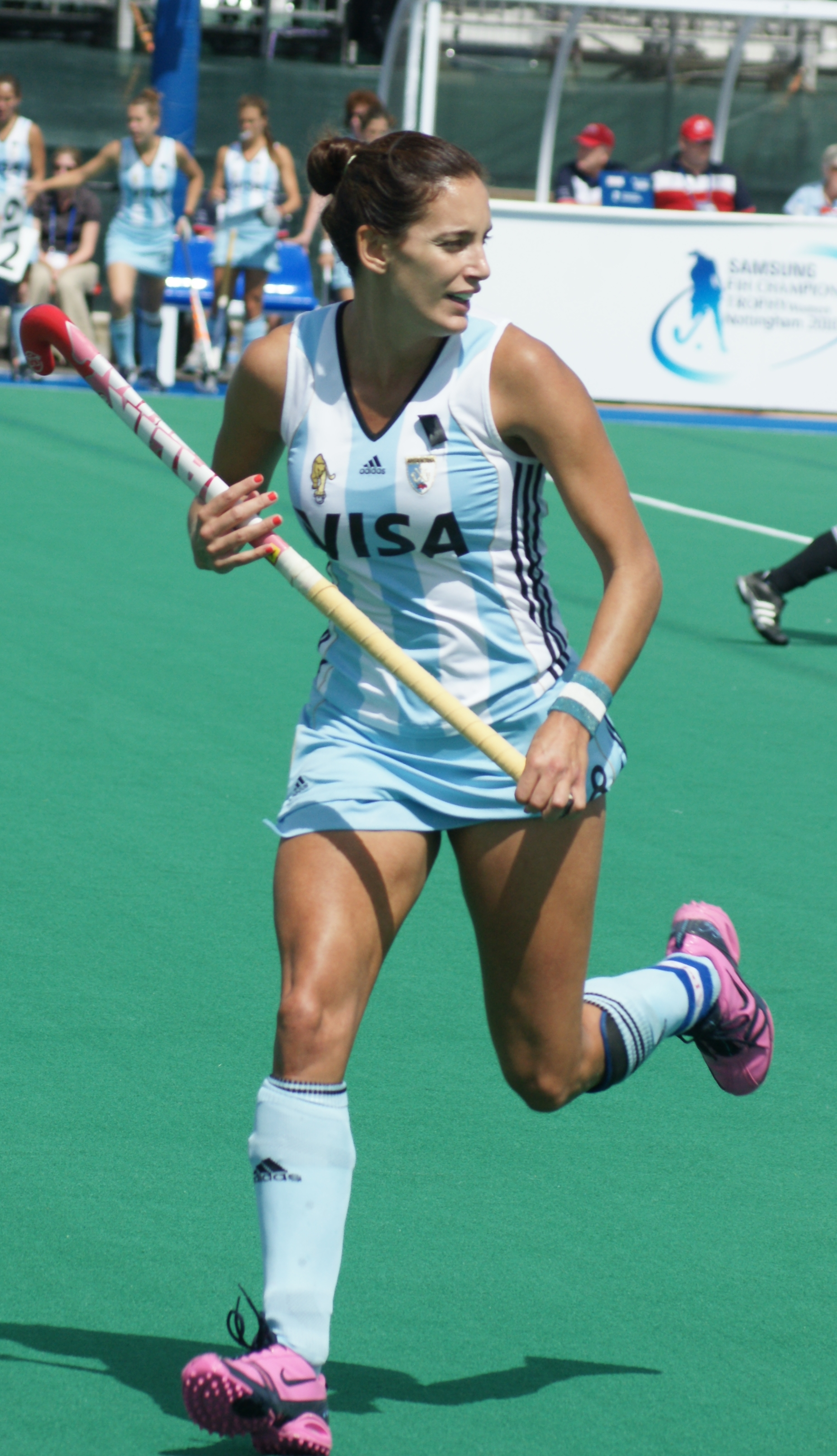
Luciana Aymar

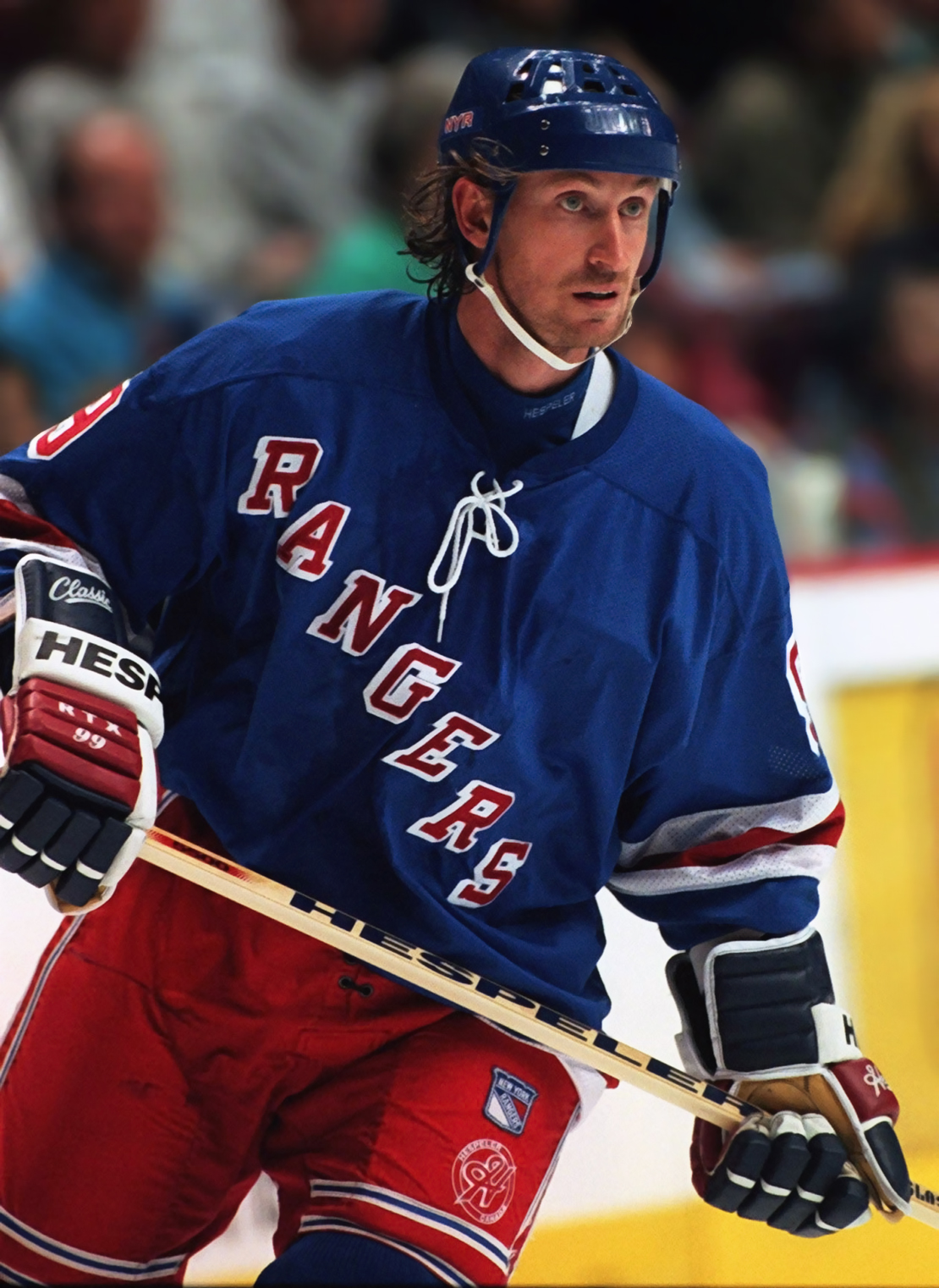
Wayne Gretzky

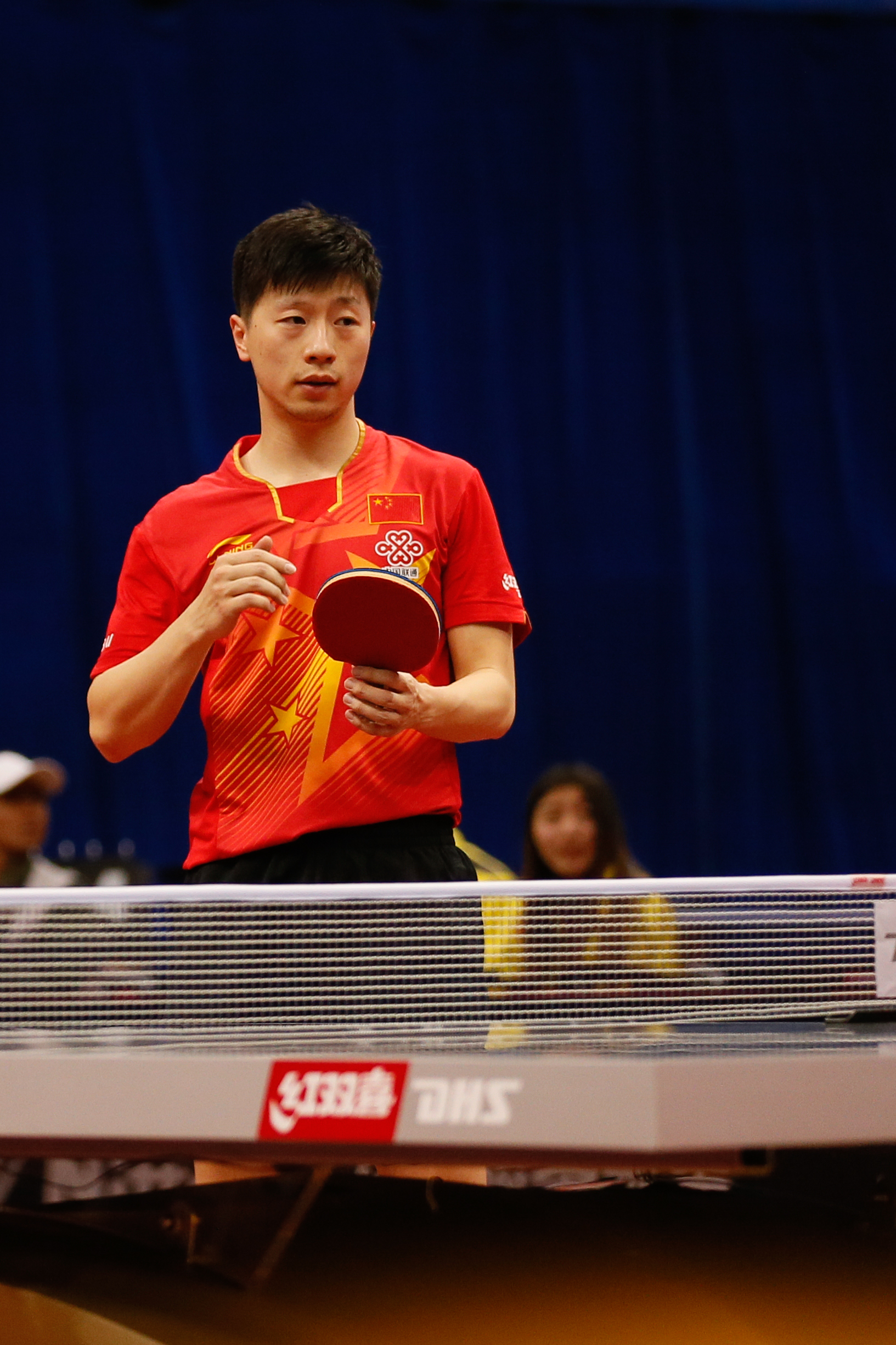
Ma Long

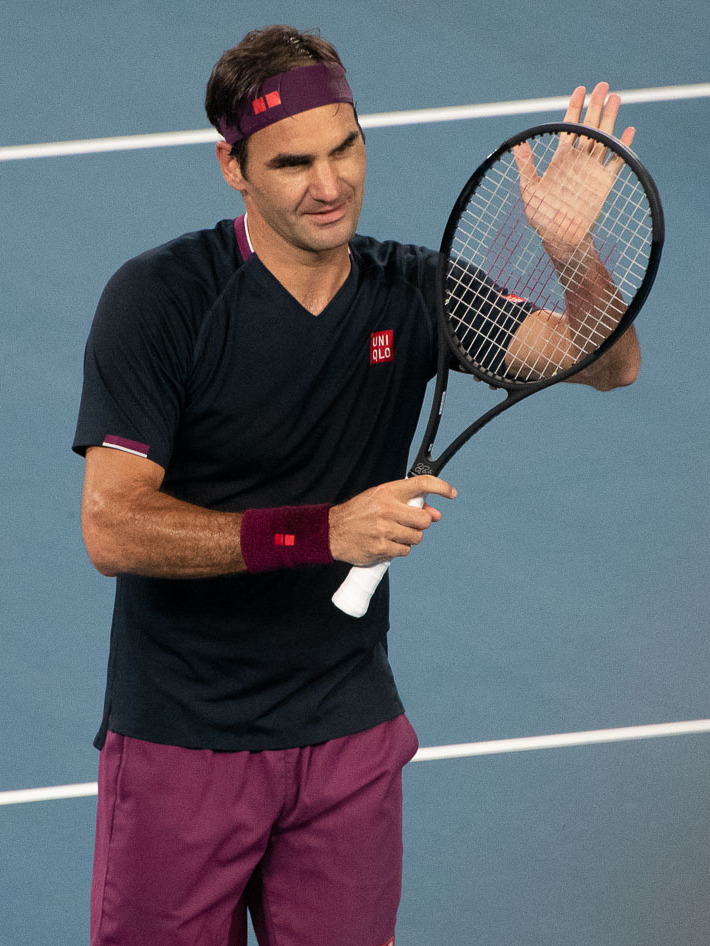
Roger Federer

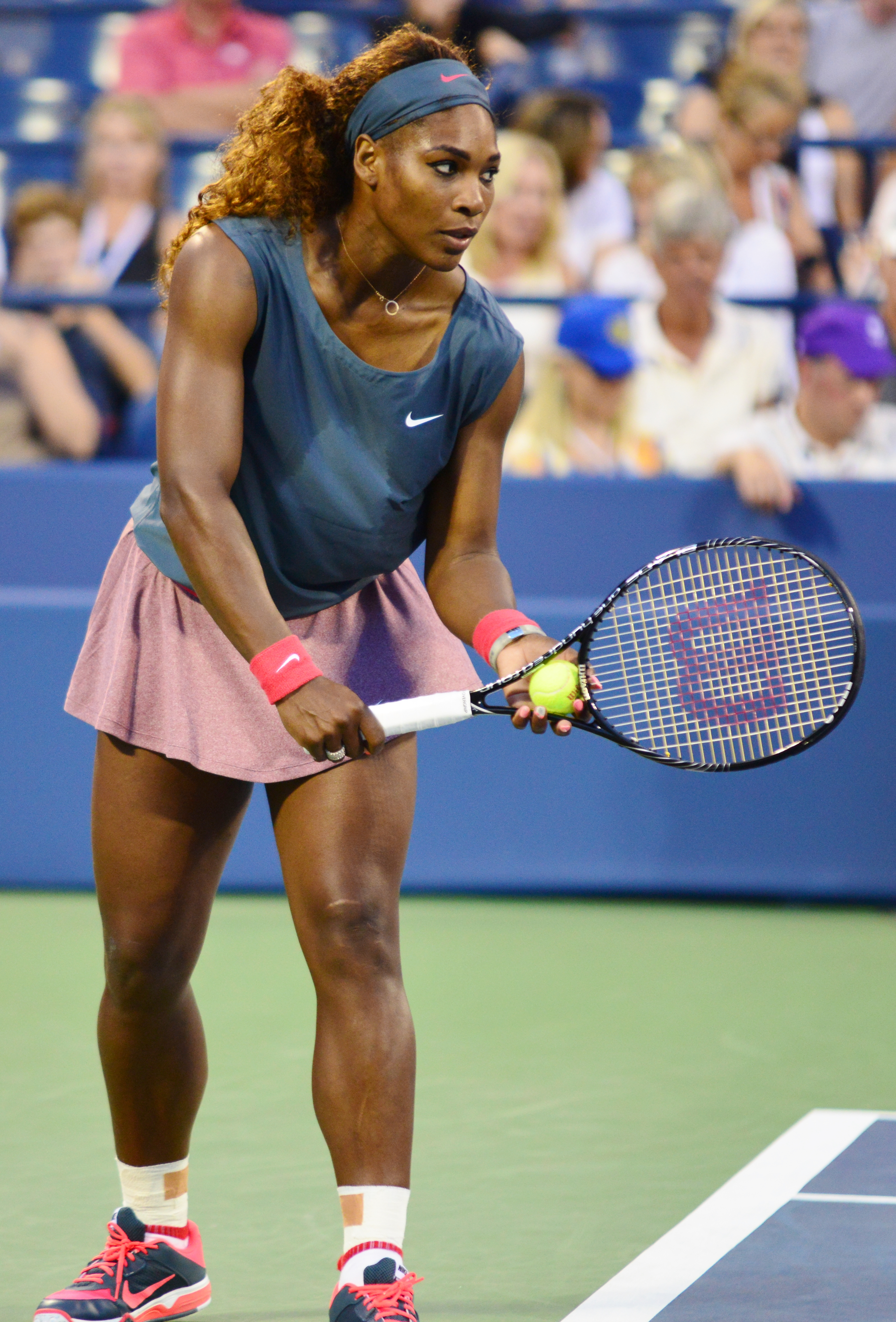
Serena Williams

List of athletes considered the greatest
Sport	Player	Sources
American football	(United States) Tom Brady	(Note: Sources or lists that share such an opinion include: Complex (2015); ESPN (2017); Courier Journal (2019); The Athletic (2021); NFL.com (2022), (2023); CBS Sports (2024), (2025); Stadium Talk (2024); ClutchPoints (2025); GiveMeSport fan poll (2025); Sportsnaut (2025))
American football	(United States) Jim Brown	(Note: Sources or lists that share such an opinion include: 500 American sports editors, writers and broadcasters polled for the "Greatest Athlete of All Time" (1976); The Sporting News (1999); Associated Press (1999); Topeka & Shawnee County Public Library (2014); New York Daily News (2014); Pittsburgh Post-Gazette (2023))
American football	(United States) Jerry Rice	(Note: Sources or lists that share such an opinion include: NFL Network's Top 100 (2010); KNBR (2017); Bleacher Report (2018); USA Today (2019))
Association football (men's)	(Argentina) Diego Maradona	(Note: Sources or lists that share such an opinion include: 90min; Football Ground Map; Eurosport (2016); FourFourTwo (2020); The Mirror (2020))
Association football (men's)	(Argentina) Lionel Messi	(Note: Sources or lists that share such an opinion include: The Telegraph (2015); The Daily Star (2016); Eurosport (2016), (2022, Eurosport.es readers' poll); Voetbal International (2017); Paper (2018); HITC (2018), (2026); BBC Sport (2020); SPORTbible (2022); Deccan Herald (2022); FourFourTwo (2022); Diario AS (2022); Time (2022); Bleacher Report (2022), (2026, readers' poll); Deutsche Welle (2022); Gentlemen's Quarterly (2022); International Business Times (2022); NBC Sports Boston (2022); Radio New Zealand (2022); Daily Sabah (2022), (2026); Playing for 90 (2022); The Mirror readers' poll (2023); 90min (2023); The Athletic (2023), (2025, readers' poll), (2026); Radio Times (2023); Forbes (2023); BusinessDay (2023); BeSoccer (2024); The Standard (2024); Marca (2024); Sports Illustrated (2024); Sportsnaut (2025); IFFHS (2025); Sports Mole (2025); GiveMeSport (2025); The New Indian Express (2025); So Foot (2026))
Association football (men's)	(Brazil) Pelé	(Note: Sources or lists that share such an opinion include: Pledge Sports; FIFA (2012); Eurosport (2016); The Independent (2018); Bleacher Report (2018); Complex (2018); BBC Sport (2020, Rostance); ESPN (2022); Pulse Sports Nigeria (2023); YouGov-conducted fan poll (2023))
Association football (men's)	(Portugal) Cristiano Ronaldo	(Note: Sources or lists that share such an opinion include: Los Angeles Times (2017); Sky Sports fan poll (2025); Primeira Liga (2025); Sportsdunia (2025))
Association football (women's)	(United States) Mia Hamm	(Note: Sources or lists that share such an opinion include: ESPN Classic; SportsXm; Bleacher Report (2013); Keeping It Heel (2014); Stadium Talk (2024))
Association football (women's)	(Brazil) Marta	(Note: Sources or lists that share such an opinion include: SoccerPrime; The Guardian (2016); VistaNow (2017); The18 (2018); Lineups (2020); Soofootball (2021); FuboTV (2023); Diario AS (2023); Radio Times (2024); Seu Melhor Jogo (2024); The Sporting News (2024); FourFourTwo (2025); Sportsdunia (2025); Lente Desportiva (2025))
Australian rules football	(Australia) Leigh Matthews	(Note: Sources or lists that share such an opinion include: Fluent Rugby; The Top Tens; Bettingsite.com.au; The Roar (2011); Zero Hanger (2024); The Mongrel Punt (2025))
Australian rules football	(Australia) Wayne Carey	(Note: Sources or lists that share such an opinion include: World Gambling List; Australian rules football analyst Mike Sheahan's list of the Top 50 players ever (2008); Gamebuds (2023))
Badminton	(China) Lin Dan	(Note: Sources or lists that share such an opinion include: Olympics.com (2016); ESPN (2020); China Daily (2020); New Straits Times (2024))
Baseball	(United States) Willie Mays	(Note: Sources or lists that share such an opinion include: The Athletic (2020); MLB Network (2023 panel, 2 of 3 votes); MLB.com (2024); The Ringer (2024); CNN (2024))
Baseball	(Japan) Shohei Ohtani	(Note: Sources or lists that share such an opinion include: MLB Network (2023 panel, 1 of 3 votes); Over the Monster (2023); The Paisano (2023); USA Today (2025))
Baseball	(United States) Babe Ruth	(Note: Sources or lists that share such an opinion include: 500 American sports editors, writers and broadcasters polled for the "Greatest Athlete of All Time" (1976); The Sporting News (1998); Bleacher Report (2014), (2018); Encyclopædia Britannica (2016); theScore panel (2018); Complex (2018), (2024); Audacy (2021); ESPN (2022); Franchise Sports (2022); Sportyzer (2023); ClutchPoints (2025); Modded (2025); Latest In Sports (2025); Sportsnaut (2025); 93.5/107.5 The Fan (2025))
Basketball (men's)	(United States) Kareem Abdul-Jabbar	(Note: Sources or lists that share such an opinion include: Basketball.com.au; Andscape (2017); Bleacher Report (2018))
Basketball (men's)	(United States) LeBron James	(Note: Sources or lists that share such an opinion include: Encyclopædia Britannica (2014); ESPN (2020 panel, 1 of 5 votes); Lineups (2023); Radio Times (2023); HoopsHype (2024); Hoops Habit (2024); The Athletic's The Basketball 100 (2024))
Basketball (men's)	(United States) Michael Jordan	(Note: Sources or lists that share such an opinion include: SLAM magazine (2009), (2018); ESPN SportScience (2013); ESPN (2016), (2020 panel, 3 of 5 votes); "Top 74 NBA players" list (2020); Sports Illustrated (2016); International Business Times (2017); Bleacher Report (2018), (2025); Complex (2018); ESPN-commissioned fan poll (2020); Knup Sports (2022); HoopsHype (2023); FuboTV (2023); Modded (2023); New Arena (2024); ClutchPoints (2024); The Sporting News (2024); SportsBoom (2025); GiveMeSport fan poll (2025); The Sport Review (2025); NESN (2025); Sportsnaut (2025))
Basketball (men's)	(United States) Bill Russell	(Note: Sources or lists that share such an opinion include: 500 American sports editors, writers and broadcasters polled for the "Greatest Athlete of All Time" (1976); Pro Basketball Writers Association of America (1980); Hardwood Paroxysm (2017); Prime Time Sports Talk (2017); The Providence Journal (2019); The Washington Post (2022))
Basketball (women's)	(United States) Diana Taurasi	(Note: Sources or lists that share such an opinion include: ESPN (2021); WNBA-conducted fan vote (2021); ClutchPoints (2024); Fanatik (2025); Athlon Sports (2025); LV Times (2025); GiveMeSport (2025))
Basketball (women's)	(United States) A'ja Wilson	(Note: Sources or lists that share such an opinion include: The RUN (2025); Swish Appeal (2025); Sports Illustrated (2025); ESPN (2025); The Daily Free Press (2025))
Box lacrosse	(Canada) John Tavares	(Note: Sources or lists that share such an opinion include: Spectrum News (2015); Inside Lacrosse (2016); US Box Lacrosse Association (2016))
Canadian football	(United States) Doug Flutie	(Note: Sources or lists that share such an opinion include: TSN's Top 50 CFL Players (2006); BC Lions (2020); Canada Football Chat (2021))
Cricket (men's, any form)	(Australia) Don Bradman	(Note: Sources or lists that share such an opinion include: The Independent (2008); Fan poll conducted BBC Asian Network (2019); Hamro Khelkud (2020); National Review (2023); MarkMeets (2023); SportsBoom (2025); Cric Informers (2025); Cricket Gaga (2025))
Cricket (men's, any form)	(India) Sachin Tendulkar	(Note: Sources or lists that share such an opinion include: The Sydney Morning Herald fan poll (2011); Cricket Kenya (2022); Sportsmonkie (2023); Wheon Cricket (2025))
Golf	(United States) Jack Nicklaus	(Note: Sources or lists that share such an opinion include: 500 American sports editors, writers and broadcasters polled for the "Greatest Athlete of All Time" (1976); LINKS magazine; ESPN (2016); KNBR (2018); Pledge Sports (2022); GQ Australia (2024); New Arena (2024); Golfshake (2025); Ranker fan poll (2025); Traveling Golfer (2025))
Golf	(United States) Tiger Woods	(Note: Sources or lists that share such an opinion include: The Top Tens; Bleacher Report (2018); The Central Trend (2020); Athlon Sports (2021); Golf Digest (2022); ClutchPoints (2023); Prestige Hong Kong (2024); Golf Monthly (2024); Sportsnaut (2025); MyGolfSpy (2025))
Field hockey (in general and men's)	(India) Dhyan Chand	(Note: Sources or lists that share such an opinion include: Hockey Hooked; The Daily Telegraph (2014); Sports Yodha (2024); The Indian Express (2025))
Field hockey (women's)	(Argentina) Luciana Aymar	(Note: Sources or lists that share such an opinion include: The Daily Telegraph (2014); Olympics.com (2019); Khel Now (2021))
Futsal	(Brazil) Falcão	(Note: Sources or lists that share such an opinion include: Times of Malta (2018); Globo Esporte (2018); Telesport (2018))
Handball	(France) Nikola Karabatić	(Note: Sources or lists that share such an opinion include: Handball Planet (2024); Team Handball News (2024); European Handball Federation (2026))
Ice hockey (men's)	(Canada) Wayne Gretzky	(Note: Sources or lists that share such an opinion include: theScore (2017); Bleacher Report (2018); The Daily Campus (2020); Sportsmonkie (2023); Vanity Fair (2023); RantSports (2025); ClutchPoints (2025))
Ice hockey (men's)	(Canada) Gordie Howe	(Note: Sources or lists that share such an opinion include: USA Today Sports (2017); Bleacher Report (2018); Encyclopædia Britannica (2021); GiveMeSport (2025))
Ice hockey (men's)	(Canada) Bobby Orr	(Note: Sources or lists that share such an opinion include: The Athletic (2018); National Post (2016); Puck Prose (2016))
Ice hockey (women's)	(Canada) Marie-Philip Poulin	(Note: Sources or lists that share such an opinion include: The Athletic (2019); The Hockey Writers (2022); Sportsnet (2022); Daily Faceoff (2024))
Indoor soccer	(Socialist Federal Republic of Yugoslavia) Slaviša Žungul	(Note: Sources or lists that share such an opinion include: Society for American Soccer History (2015); The Guardian (2016); Escondido Grapevine (2026))
Lacrosse	(Canada) Gary Gait	(Note: Sources or lists that share such an opinion include: BC Sports Hall of Fame (2011); (2018): Central New York Business Journal (2021); Premier Lacrosse League (2022); SF Active (2024))
Rugby league	(Australia) Cameron Smith	(Note: Sources or lists that share such an opinion include: Rugby League Zone (2019); The Roar (2019); ESPN (2020))
Rugby union	(United Kingdom) Gareth Edwards	(Note: Sources or lists that share such an opinion include: Rugby World (2003); (2018): Bleacher Report (2008); Encyclopædia Britannica (2024); The Times (2024))
Rugby union	(New Zealand) Jonah Lomu	(Note: Sources or lists that share such an opinion include: The Rugby Paper (2018); Radio Times (2023); Ruck.co.uk (2024); KZN Rugby (2025); Rugby Addict (2025); HugeRugby (2025))
Rugby union	(New Zealand) Richie McCaw	(Note: Sources or lists that share such an opinion include: Stuff (2015); Pledge Sports (2017); WalesOnline (2018))
Softball	(United States) Lisa Fernandez	(Note: Sources or lists that share such an opinion include: LA TV (2022); Newsweek (2022); SF Active (2024))
Squash	(Pakistan) Jahangir Khan	(Note: Sources or lists that share such an opinion include: Time (2006); BBC Sport (2016); PSA Squash Tour (2020))
Table tennis	(China) Ma Long	(Note: Sources or lists that share such an opinion include: Times Now (2021); International Olympic Committee (2023); Time (2024); NBC (2024); KreedOn (2024))
Tennis (men's)	(Serbia) Novak Djokovic	(Note: Sources or lists that share such an opinion include: Pledge Sports (2022); Vogue Australia (2024); CNN (2025); GQ (2025); SportsBoom (2025); Sportsnaut (2025); GiveMeSport (2025))
Tennis (men's)	(Switzerland) Roger Federer	(Note: Sources or lists that share such an opinion include: Tennis Channel (2012); ESPN Sport Science (2012); International Business Times (2013); FiveThirtyEight (2015); ESPN panel of experts (2016); Bleacher Report (2018); GiveMeSport fan poll (2019); Sports Pundit (2021); World Tennis Magazine (2023))
Tennis (men's)	(Australia) Rod Laver	(Note: Sources or lists that share such an opinion include: BBC Sport (2003); Athletes Quarterly (2014); Good Weekend (2019); Whitsunday News (2025); The Sporting News (2025))
Tennis (men's)	(Spain) Rafael Nadal	(Note: Sources or lists that share such an opinion include: Rockford Register Star (2013); ESPN (2018); Luckbox magazine (2020); Diario Sur (2022))
Tennis (women's)	(Australia) Margaret Court	(Note: Sources or lists that share such an opinion include: The Guardian (2020); The Australian online reader's poll (2021); The Parkersburg News and Sentinel (2022); GQ (2025))
Tennis (women's)	(Germany) Steffi Graf	(Note: Sources or lists that share such an opinion include: "The 20 Greatest Players of the 20th Century", chosen by a panel of 108 sportswriters and editors for Tennis (magazine) (1999); Tennis Channel (2012); ESPN panel of experts (2016); Tennis Abstract's 128 greatest tennis players of all time (2022))
Tennis (women's)	(Czechoslovakia) (United States) Martina Navratilova	(Note: Sources or lists that share such an opinion include: The Times (1993); Sports Central (2013); Bleacher Report (2018))
Tennis (women's)	(United States) Serena Williams	(Note: Sources or lists that share such an opinion include: CBS Sports (2015); Statesman Journal (2016); Bleacher Report (2018), (2022); Complex (2018); New York Daily News (2018); ESPN (2022); Radio Times (2023); The Sporting News (2024); National Urban League (2025); GiveMeSport fan poll (2025); The Times of India (2025))
Volleyball (men's): Beach and indoor variants	(United States) Karch Kiraly	(Note: Sources or lists that share such an opinion include: SandCast; United States Olympic & Paralympic Museum; Los Angeles Times (1993); Stadium Talk (2024))

=== Combat sports ===
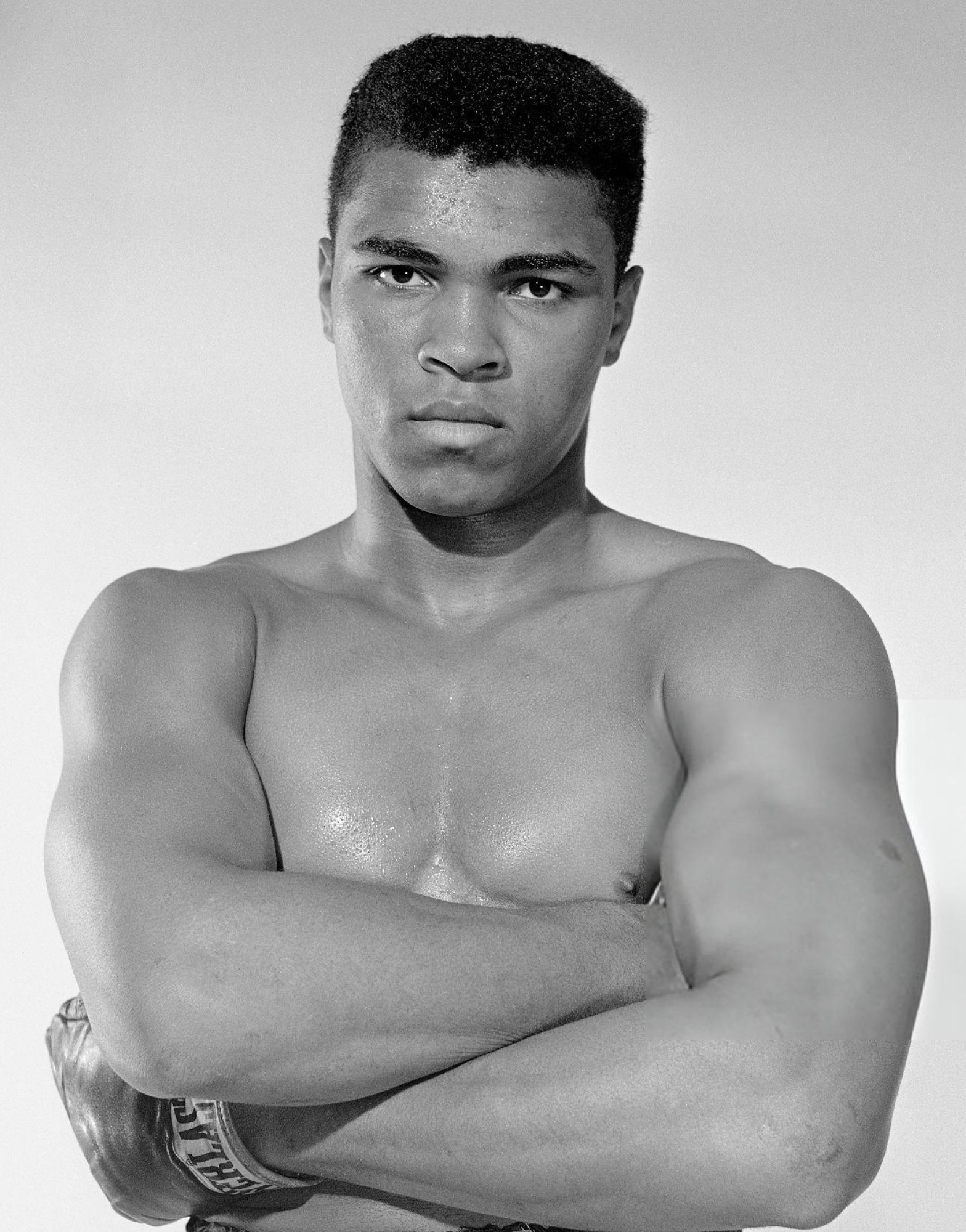
Muhammad Ali

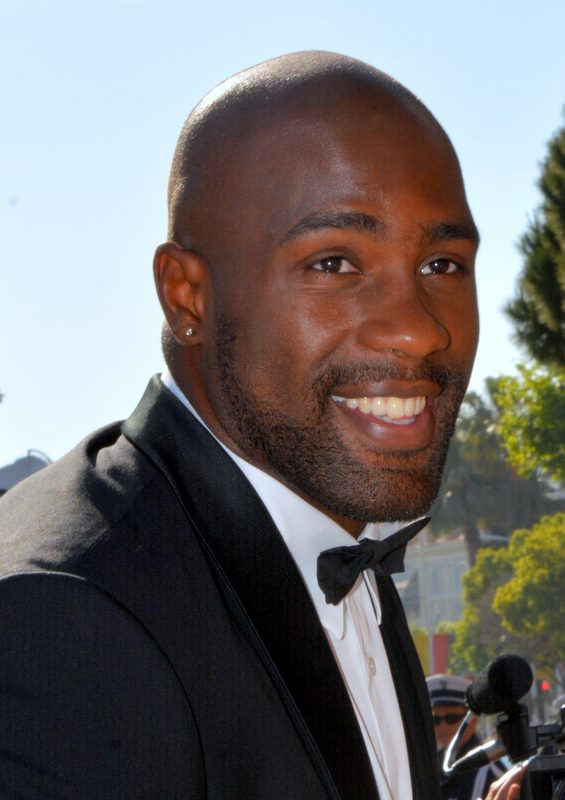
Teddy Riner

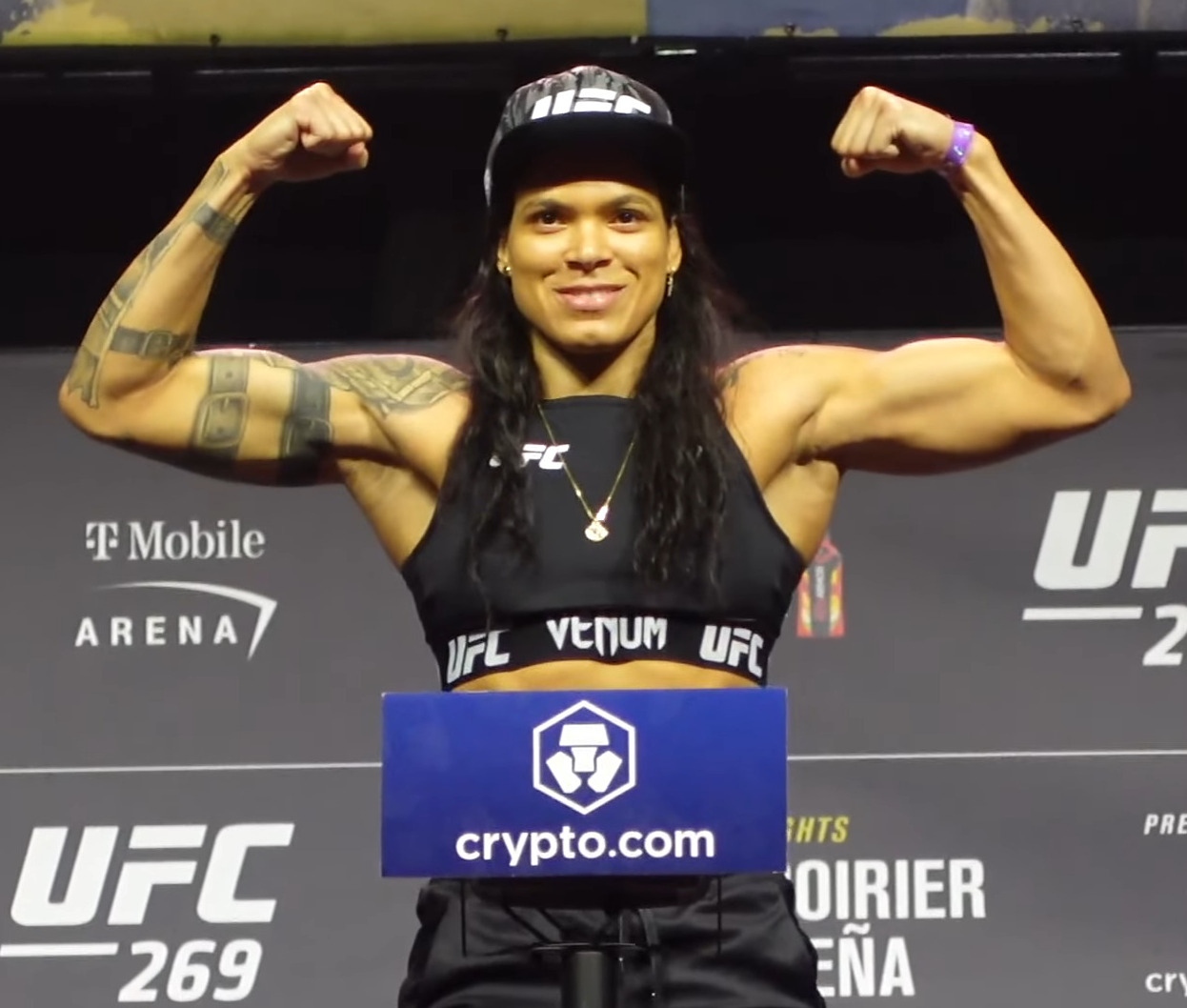
Amanda Nunes

List of athletes considered the greatest
Sport	Player	Sources
Boxing (men's)	(United States) Muhammad Ali	(Note: Sources or lists that share such an opinion include: 500 American sports editors, writers and broadcasters polled for the "Greatest Athlete of All Time" (1976); ESPN-conducted fan poll (1999); fan poll (2013); Daily Sun (2016); The Chicago Crusader (2016); Bleacher Report (2018); Complex (2018); University of Louisville (UofL) Muhammad Ali Institute for Peace and Justice and UofL Libraries (2021); Boxing News (2023); The Sportster (2024), (2025); ZonalSports (2025); Lente Desportiva (2025))
Boxing (men's)	(United States) Sugar Ray Robinson	(Note: Sources or lists that share such an opinion include: ESPN (1999), (2007); Bleacher Report (2018); The Ring (2022); SportsBoom (2024); ClutchPoints (2024); Yardbarker (2025))
Boxing (women's)	(United States) Laila Ali	(Note: Sources or lists that share such an opinion include: ESPN (2016); USA Today (2020); Koma Club (2025); The Sportster (2025))
Boxing (women's)	(United States) Claressa Shields	(Note: Sources or lists that share such an opinion include: DAZN (2022); SportsBoom (2025))
Boxing (women's)	(Republic of Ireland) Katie Taylor	(Note: Sources or lists that share such an opinion include: The Sporting News (2022); GiveMeSport (2022); WebWire (2025); The Times of India (2025))
Brazilian jiu-jitsu	(Brazil) Roger Gracie	(Note: Sources or lists that share such an opinion include: Grappling Insider (2019); BJJ Eastern Europe (2020); BJJ World (2021))
Collegiate (folkstyle) wrestling	(United States) Cael Sanderson	(Note: Sources or lists that share such an opinion include: WIN Magazine (2010); FloWrestling (2017); InterMat (2019))
Fencing	(Italy) Edoardo Mangiarotti	(Note: Sources or lists that share such an opinion include: International Olympic Committee (2003); The Sunday Times (2012); SF Active (2024))
Freestyle wrestling (men's)	(Russia) Buvaisar Saitiev	(Note: Sources or lists that share such an opinion include: United World Wrestling (2007); MMA Fighting (2025); MMA UK (2025); Athlon Sports (2025))
Freestyle wrestling (women's)	(Japan) Kaori Icho	(Note: Sources or lists that share such an opinion include: FanSided (2016); Sports Illustrated (2016); The Olympians (2016))
Freestyle wrestling (women's)	(Japan) Saori Yoshida	(Note: Sources or lists that share such an opinion include: Olympics (2015); Inside The Games (2019); Guinness World Records (2025))
Greco-Roman wrestling	(Russia) Aleksandr Karelin	(Note: Sources or lists that share such an opinion include: Wrestler For You; GQ (2017); Bleacher Report (2018); Yardbarker (2025))
Greco-Roman wrestling	(Cuba) Mijaín López	(Note: Sources or lists that share such an opinion include: CiberCuba (2024); Centro Caribe Sports (2024); Sports Illustrated (2024))
Judo (men's)	(France) Teddy Riner	(Note: Sources or lists that share such an opinion include: International Olympic Committee (2024); The Athletic (2024); KOBI (2024); Trinidad and Tobago Guardian (2025))
Judo (women's)	(Japan) Ryoko Tani	(Note: Sources or lists that share such an opinion include: IJF; Japan Today (2011); CNN (2018))
Karate	(Azerbaijan) Rafael Aghayev	(Note: Sources or lists that share such an opinion include: Karate Combat (2022); FightBook MMA (2022); Karate Insights (2025))
MMA (men's)	(United States) Demetrious Johnson	(Note: Sources or lists that share such an opinion include: ONE Championship (2022); MyMMANews (2024))
MMA (men's)	(United States) Jon Jones	(Note: Sources or lists that share such an opinion include: WhatCulture (2015); Yahoo Sports (2017), (2023); ESPN (2019); MMA Sucka (2022); CBS Sports (2023); Yardbarker (2024); New Arena (2024); MMA Weekly (2024); NY Fights (2025); Sportsnaut (2025))
MMA (men's)	(Brazil) Anderson Silva	(Note: Sources or lists that share such an opinion include: ESPN Sport Science (2012); The Roar (2013); Bleacher Report (2018); Complex (2018))
MMA (men's)	(Canada) Georges St-Pierre	(Note: Sources or lists that share such an opinion include: Fight Matrix; MMA Today; ESPN (2019); Cleveland.com (2022); SportsBoom (2024); Ranker fan poll (2025))
MMA (women's)	(Brazil) Cris Cyborg	(Note: Sources or lists that share such an opinion include: MMA Press Room; Bleacher Report (2017), (2018); TSN (2018))
MMA (women's)	(Brazil) Amanda Nunes	(Note: Sources or lists that share such an opinion include: Fight Matrix; CBS Sports (2018); South China Morning Post (2020); The Sports Network (2023); MMA Mania (2023); The Sportster (2024))
Sumo	(Mongolia) Hakuhō Shō	(Note: Sources or lists that share such an opinion include: Hindustan Times (2018); The Telegraph (2019); The Japan Times (2021); The Washington Post (2021))

=== Extreme and adventure sports ===
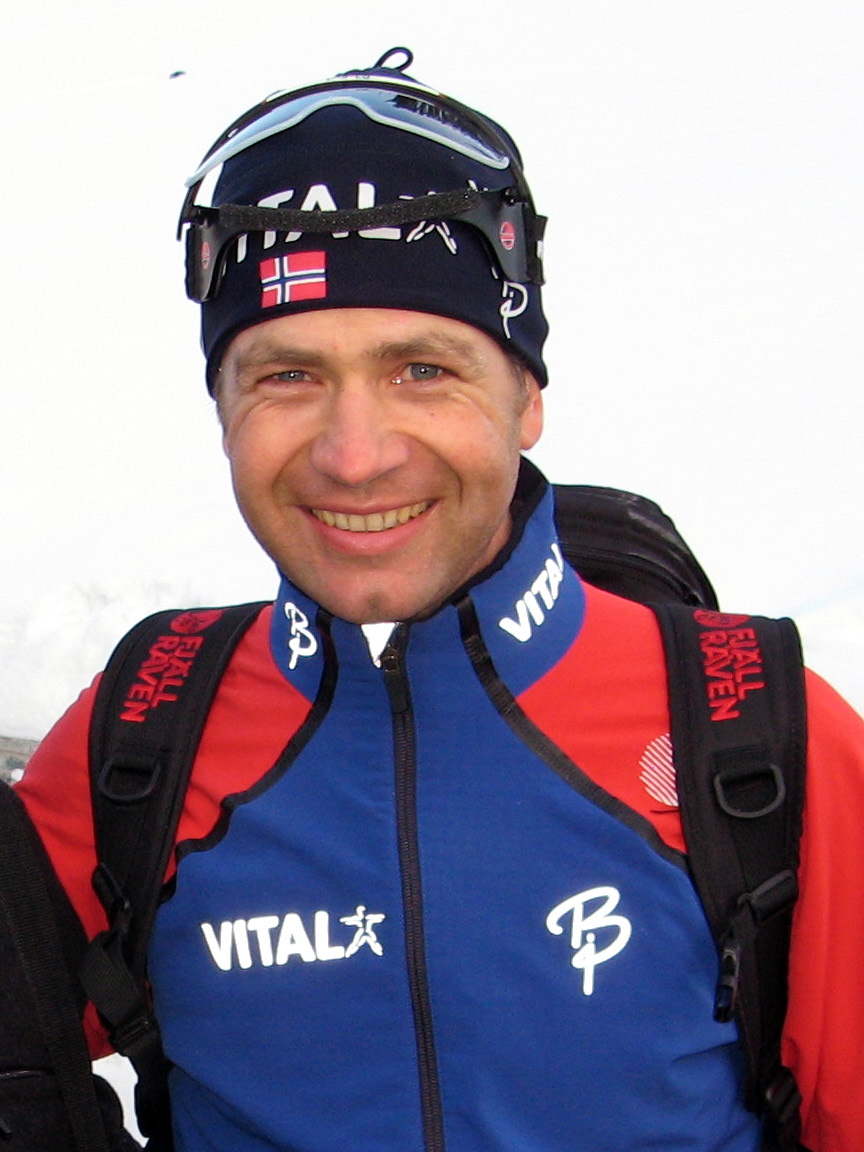
Ole Einar Bjørndalen

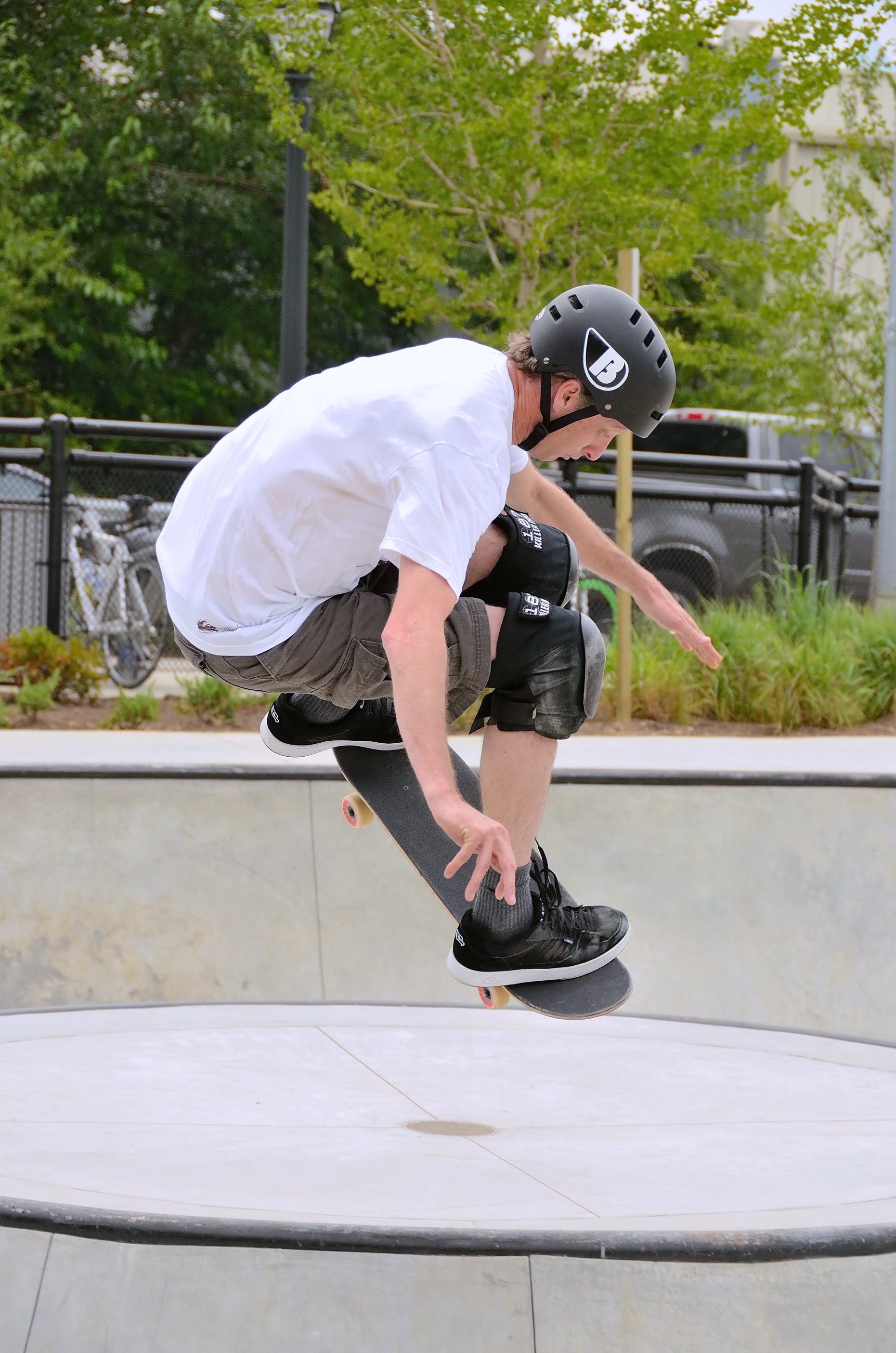
Tony Hawk

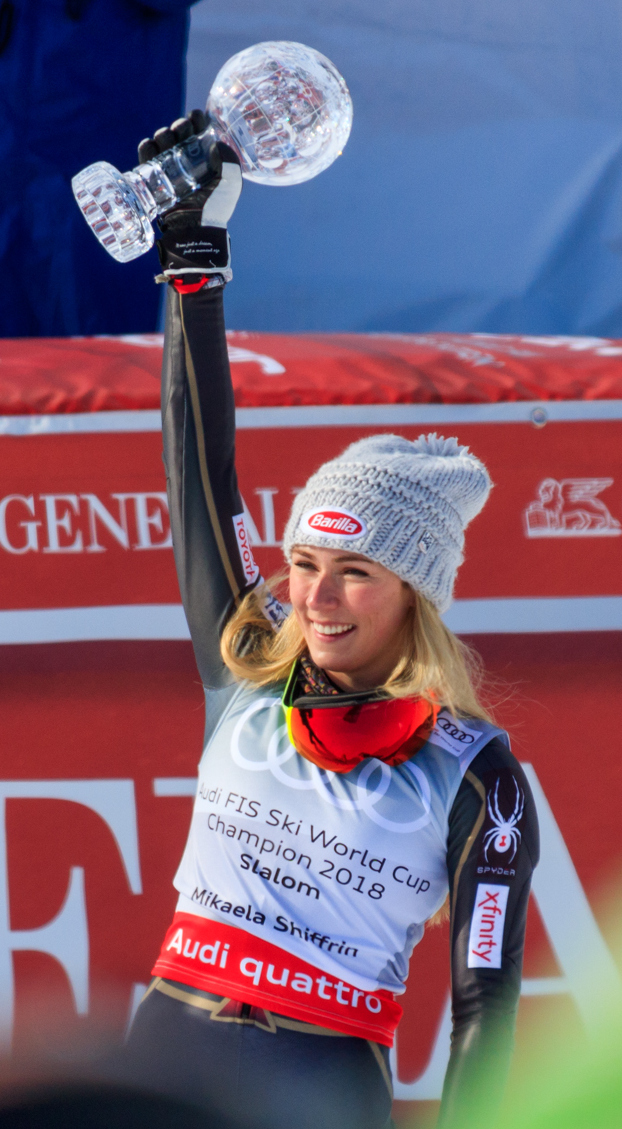
Mikaela Shiffrin

List of athletes considered the greatest
Sport	Player	Sources
Biathlon	(Norway) Ole Einar Bjørndalen	(Note: Sources or lists that share such an opinion include: USA Today Sports (2022); Frontier Partisans (2024); Escarpment Magazine (2025))
Cross-country skiing	(Norway) Johannes Høsflot Klæbo	(Note: Sources or lists that share such an opinion include: Man & Culture Magazine (2026); The Guardian (2026); The Athletic (2026))
Skateboarding	(United States) Tony Hawk	(Note: Sources or lists that share such an opinion include: 97 Rock (2015); ESPN (2018); The Wall Street Journal (2022); Ripped Laces (2023); Red Bull (2023); Surfer magazine (2025))
Skiing (in general and men's)	(Sweden) Ingemar Stenmark	(Note: Sources or lists that share such an opinion include: The Economist (1999); The Columbus Dispatch (2017); Elan Sports (2020); FasterSkier (2021); SKI magazine (2024))
Skiing (in general and women's)	(United States) Mikaela Shiffrin	(Note: Sources or lists that share such an opinion include: FiveThirtyEight (2023); InTheSnow (2023); ESPN (2023); (2025); Outside magazine (2023); Houston Business Journal (2023); Flashscore (2025); Snow Brains (2025); Ski Paradise (2025))
Ski jumping	(Finland) Matti Nykänen	(Note: Sources or lists that share such an opinion include: The Times (2019); Yle (2019); All Things Nordic (2022))
Snowboarding	(Norway) Terje Håkonsen	(Note: Sources or lists that share such an opinion include: Snowboarder Magazine (2018); Morzine Source Magazine (2023); Fri Flyt (2024); Red Bull (2025))
Snowboarding	(United States) Craig Kelly	(Note: Sources or lists that share such an opinion include: Snowboard Magazine (2006); Snowboarder Magazine (2017); Red Bull (2025))
Snowboarding	(United States) Shaun White	(Note: Sources or lists that share such an opinion include: Sports Illustrated (2018); The Washington Post (2018); SkateboardersHQ (2020); Los Angeles Times (2022); Yahoo! Sports (2022); Snowboarder Life (2024))
Surfing	(United States) Kelly Slater	(Note: Sources or lists that share such an opinion include: Encyclopædia Britannica; International Olympic Committee; Slate (2010); Surfer (2011), (2024); Honolulu Star-Advertiser (2024))

=== Mind sports ===
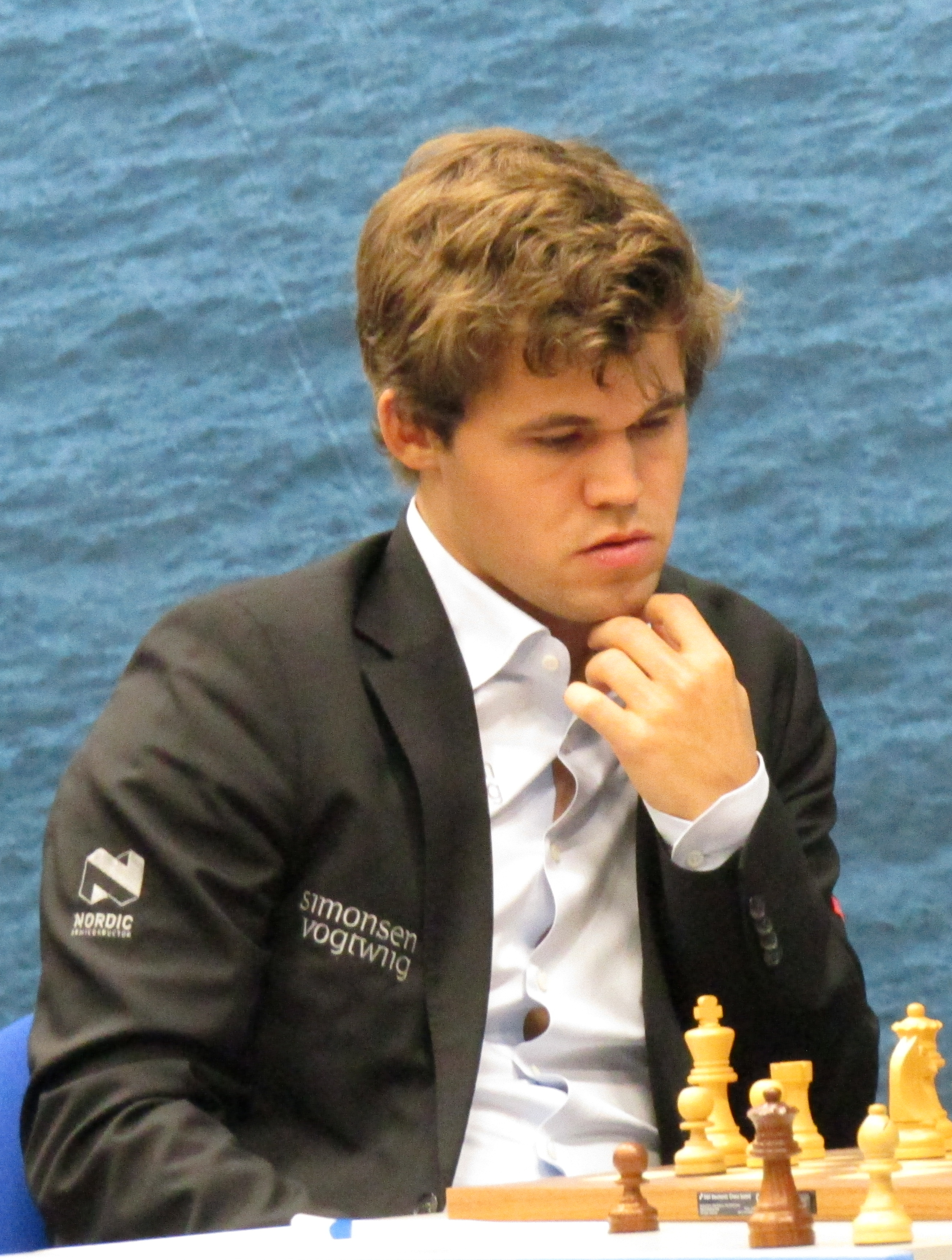
Magnus Carlsen

List of athletes considered the greatest
Sport	Player	Sources
Chess	(Norway) Magnus Carlsen	(Note: Sources or lists that share such an opinion include: The Chess World (2021); FIDE (2024); The Wall Street Journal (2024); The Athletic (2025); The Times of India (2025))
Chess	(Russia) Garry Kasparov	(Note: Sources or lists that share such an opinion include: CNN (2015); The Chess Journal (2021); Radio Times (2023); Chess.com (2025))
Speedcubing (general)	(Australia) Feliks Zemdegs	(Note: Sources or lists that share such an opinion include: The Sydney Morning Herald (2015); Deadline (2021); The Guardian (2025))

=== Esports ===
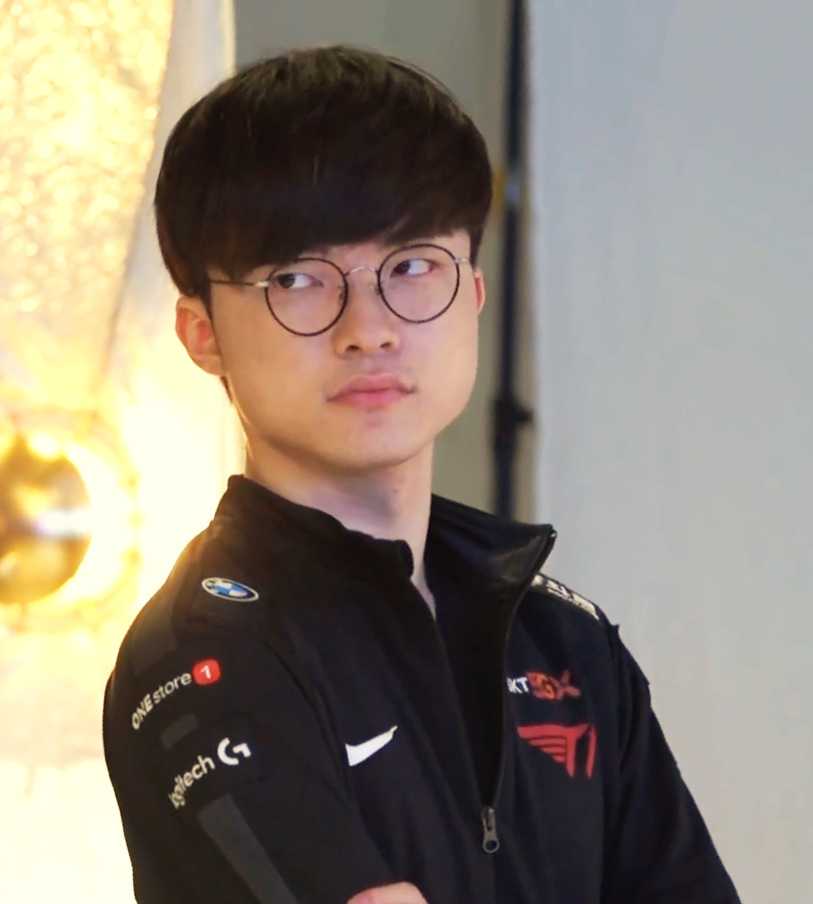
Faker

List of athletes considered the greatest
Sport	Player	Sources
Counter-Strike: Global Offensive	(Ukraine) s1mple	(Note: Sources or lists that share such an opinion include: HLTV (2023); Escore News (2025); HotSpawn (2025))
Fortnite	(United States) Bugha	(Note: Sources or lists that share such an opinion include: Lineups (2023); Insider Gaming (2024); TheSpike.gg (2025); Next Level GG (2025))
Fortnite	(United States) Peterbot	(Note: Sources or lists that share such an opinion include: 1883 Magazine (2024); Hotspawn (2025); Esports Insider (2025))
League of Legends	(South Korea) Faker	(Note: Sources or lists that share such an opinion include: ESPN (2019); TheGamer (2021); Lineups (2023); GamesRadar+ (2023); Red Bull (2024); Blix.gg (2024); Rivalry (2025); Esports.net (2025))
Overwatch	(South Korea) Fleta	(Note: Sources or lists that share such an opinion include: Game Specifications (2021); The Dallas Morning News (2022); Dot Esports (2023); Spilled.gg (2025))
Overwatch	(South Korea) Profit	(Note: Sources or lists that share such an opinion include: Esports.gg (2022); Dexerto (2024); Gamereactor (2024))
Rocket League	(Sweden) Turbopolsa	(Note: Sources or lists that share such an opinion include: Ginx TV (2021); Rocket League players Jayson "Fireburner" Nunez, Adam "Lawler" Thornton, Jos "ViolentPanda" van Meurs, and Garrett "GarrettG" Gordon (2023))
Starcraft: Brood War	(South Korea) Flash	(Note: Sources or lists that share such an opinion include: GameSpot (2013); Blizzard Entertainment (2015); ESPN (2016); Dexerto (2020))
Super Smash Bros. (overall)	(United States) Mew2King	(Note: Sources or lists that share such an opinion include: BigNokh (2016); Lineups (2023))
Super Smash Bros. 4	(Chile) ZeRo	(Note: Sources or lists that share such an opinion include: Event Hubs (2017); Business Insider; Lineups (2023))
Super Smash Bros. Ultimate	(Mexico) MkLeo	(Note: Sources or lists that share such an opinion include: Esports.gg (2023); Lineups (2023); Dexerto (2025))
TrackMania	(Canada) CarlJr.	(Note: Sources or lists that share such an opinion include: L'Écho de la Rive-Nord (2014); Eclypsia (2023); L'Équipe (2020))

=== Precision sports ===
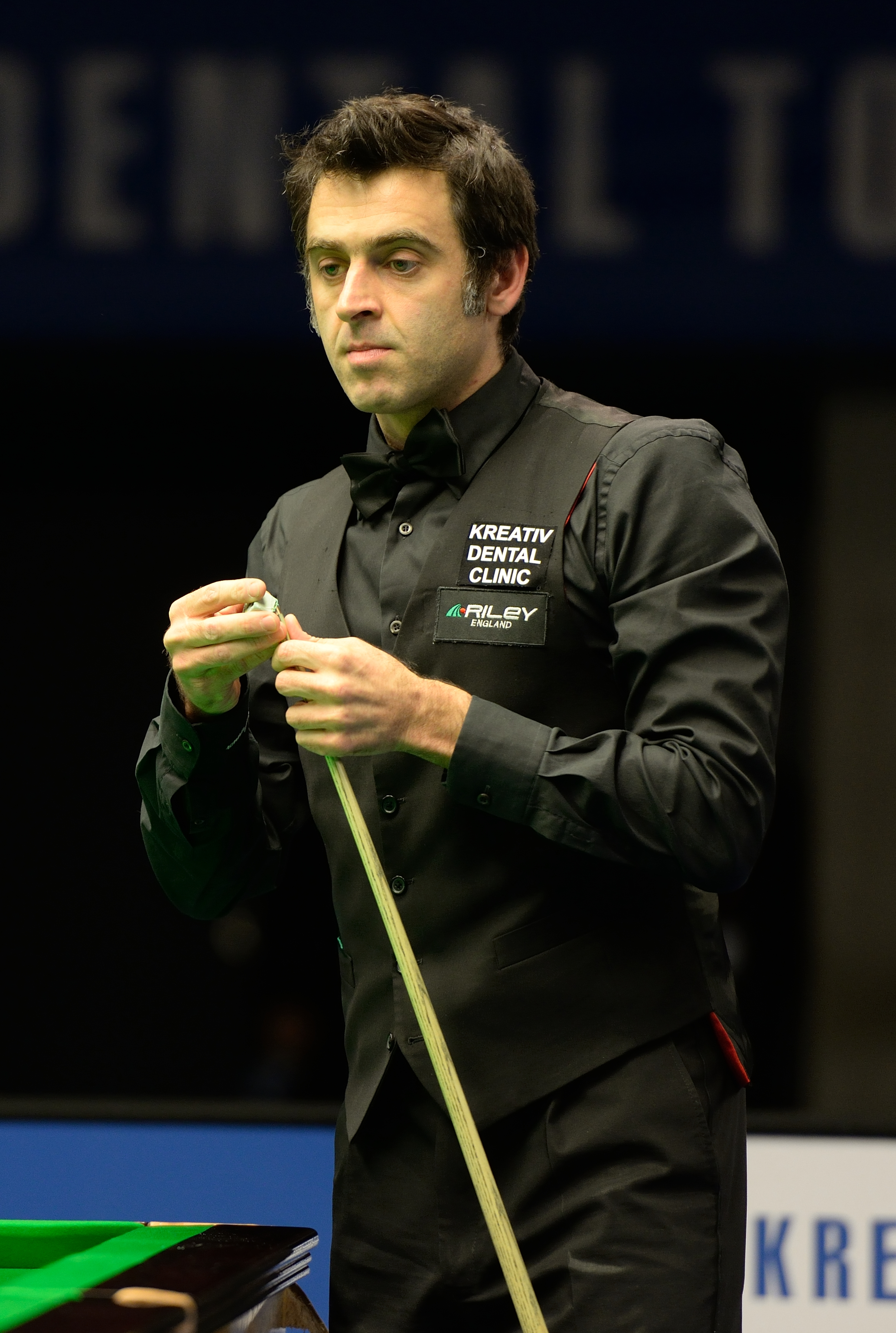
Ronnie O’Sullivan

List of athletes considered the greatest
Sport	Player	Sources
Archery (men's)	(South Korea) Kim Woo-jin	(Note: Sources or lists that share such an opinion include: World Archery (2024); The Bridge (2024); Sports Chosun (2024))
Archery (women's)	(Colombia) Sara López	(Note: Sources or lists that share such an opinion include: PA News Agency (2022); World Archery (2025); Hindustan Archery Times (2025))
Curling (men's)	(Canada) Kevin Martin	(Note: Sources or lists that share such an opinion include: CBC (2010), (2017); Worcester Telegram (2018); Edmonton Sun (2025))
Curling (men's)	(Canada) Brad Gushue	
Curling (men's)	(Sweden) Niklas Edin	
Curling (women's)	(Canada) Jennifer Jones	
Curling (women's)	(Sweden) Anette Norberg	
Curling (women's)	(Canada) Rachel Homan	
Curling (women's)	(Canada) Sandra Schmirler	
Darts	(United Kingdom) Phil Taylor	(Note: Sources or lists that share such an opinion include: History; The Guardian (2015); Sky News (2023); Radio Times (2024); SportsBoom (2025); BreakingNews.ie (2025); Talksport (2025))
Horseshoes	(United States) Alan Francis	(Note: Sources or lists that share such an opinion include: The Columbus Dispatch (2007); The New York Times (2010); Printing Impressions (2010); The Crescent-News (2022))
Pool	(Philippines) Efren Reyes	(Note: Sources or lists that share such an opinion include: Gulf News (2018); Defector (2021); The Philippine Star (2024); Toku News (2024); The Game (2024))
Snooker	(United Kingdom) Ronnie O'Sullivan	(Note: Sources or lists that share such an opinion include: TNT Sports (2020); The New York Review of Books (2025); BBC (2025); GiveMeSport (2026))
Tenpin bowling	(United States) Earl Anthony	(Note: Sources or lists that share such an opinion include: Bowling Magazine reader's poll (1985); PBA panel of experts (2008); Bowling for Beginners (2023); SF Active (2024))
Tenpin bowling	(United States) Walter Ray Williams Jr.	(Note: Sources or lists that share such an opinion include: Ocala StarBanner (2007); Washington Examiner (2007); Stadium Talk (2024))

=== Parasports ===
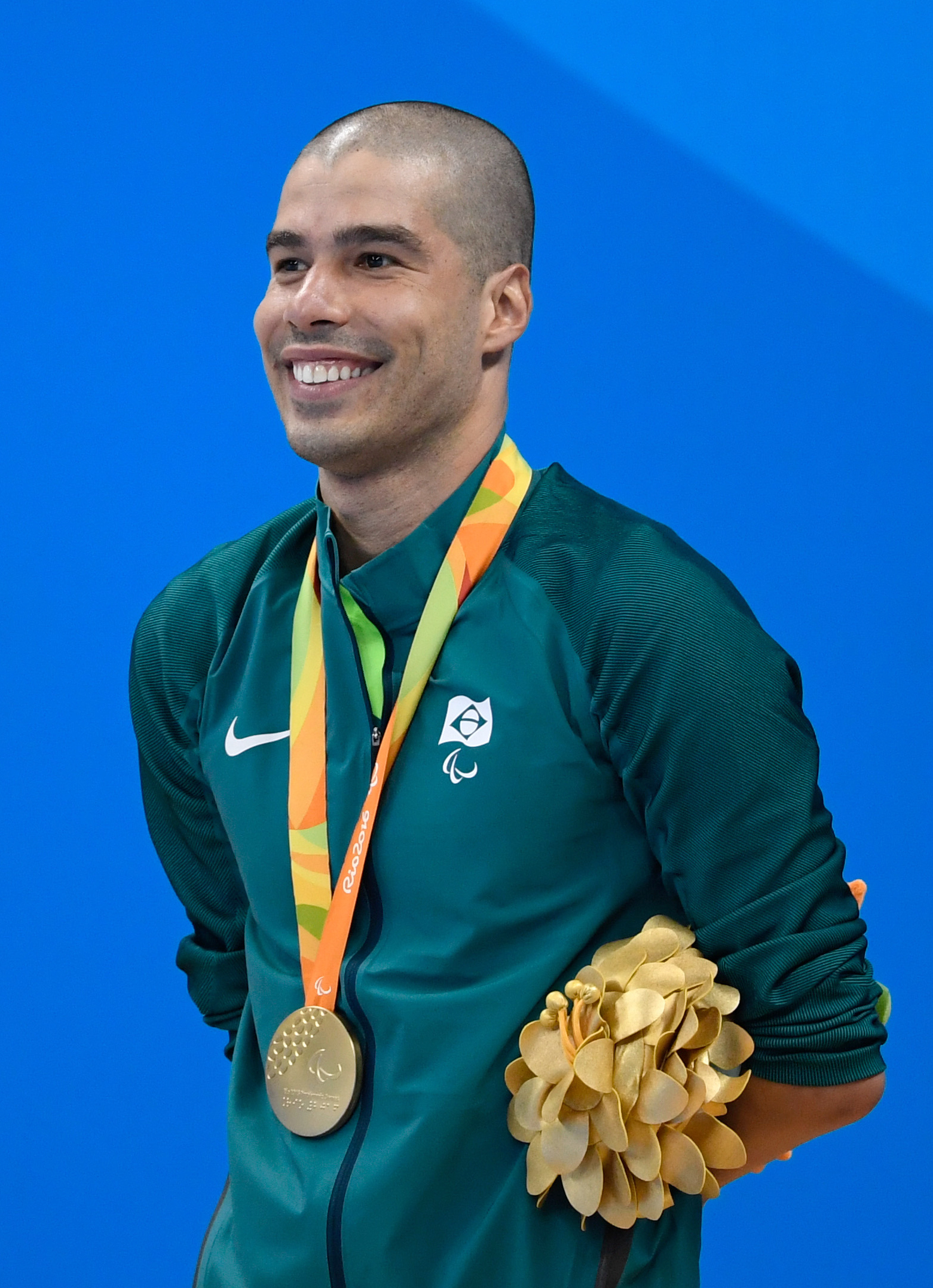
Daniel Dias

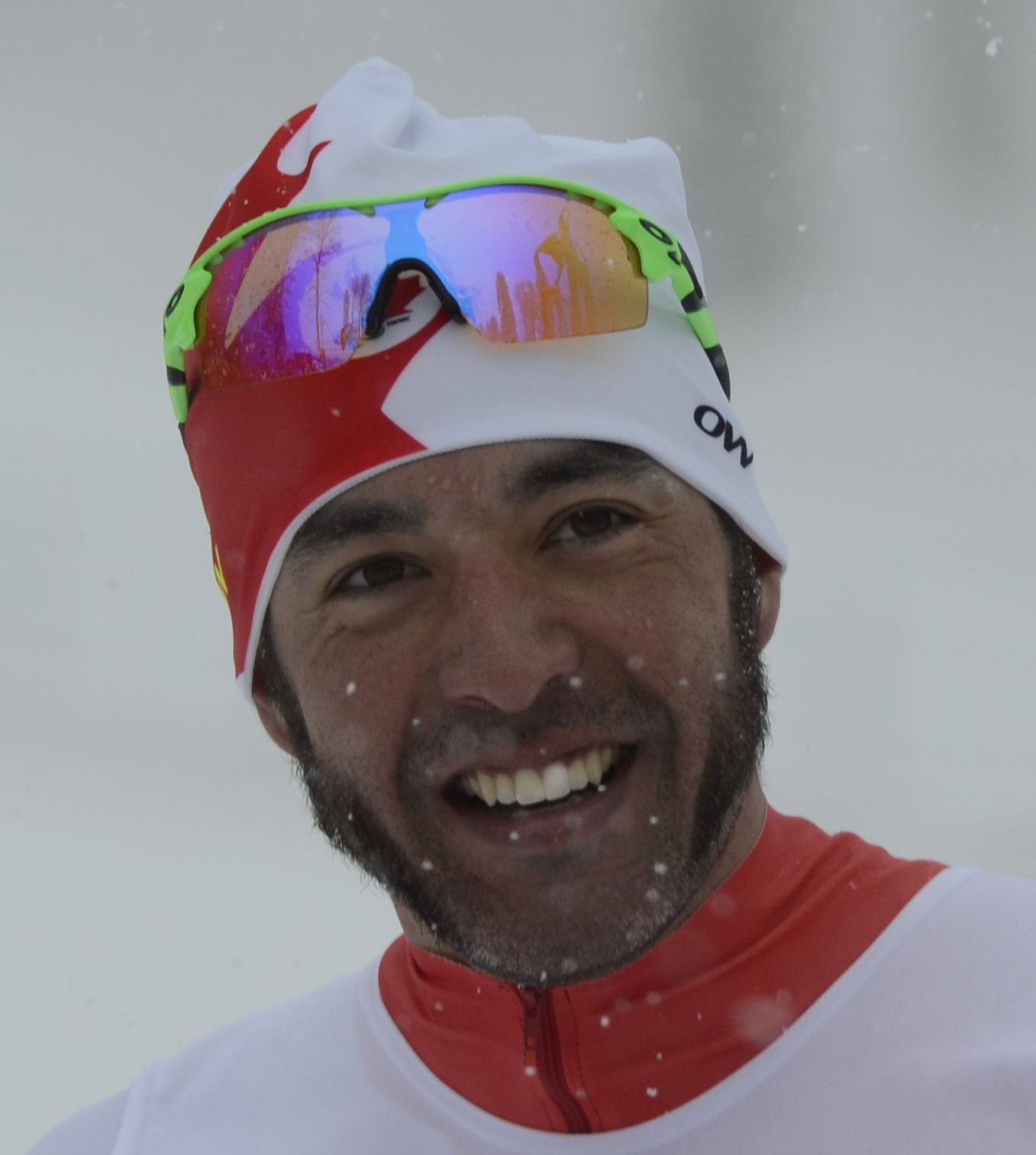
Brian McKeever

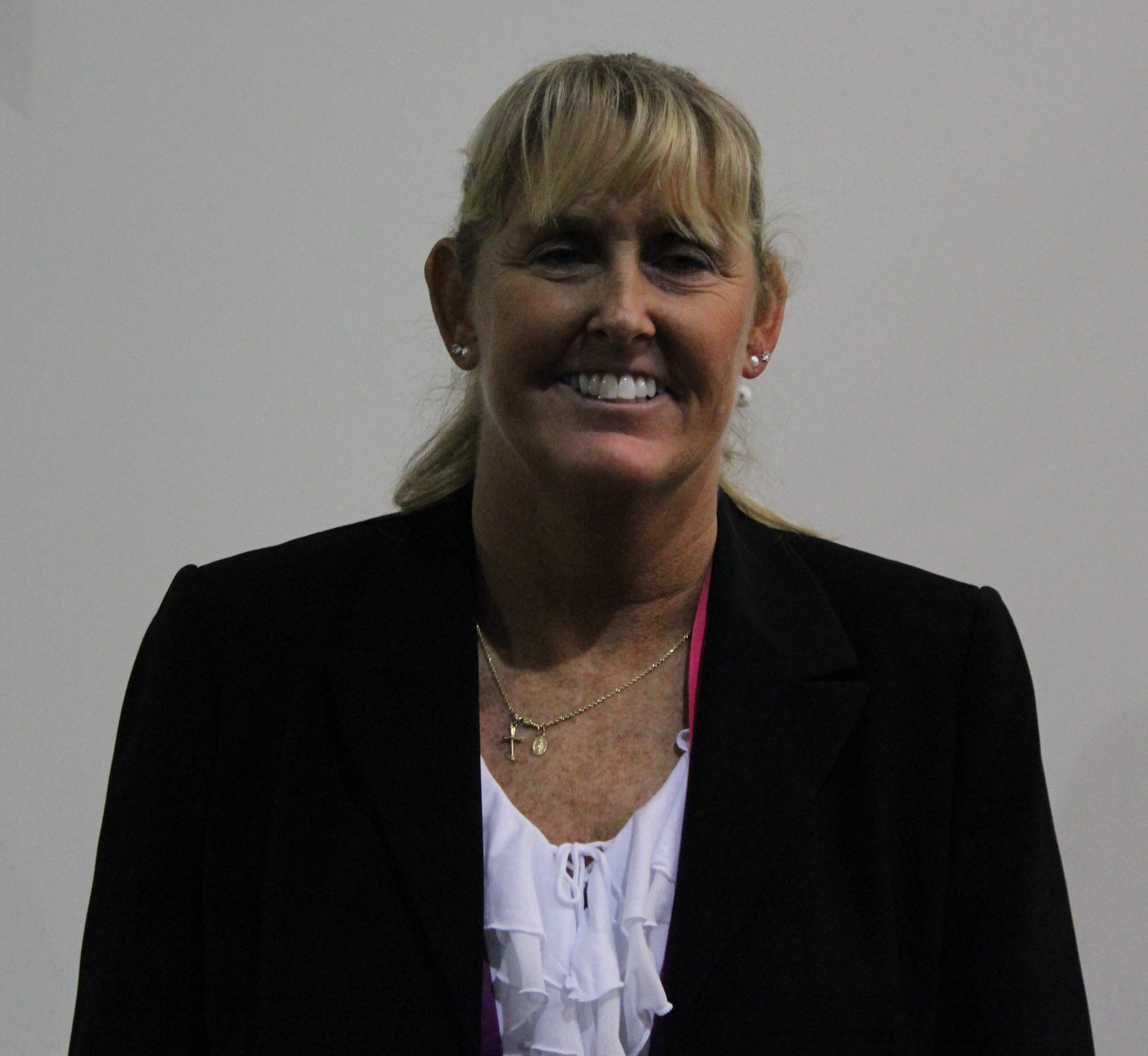
Trischa Zorn

List of athletes considered the greatest
Sport	Player	Sources
Goalball	(Turkey) Sevda Altunoluk	(Note: Sources or lists that share such an opinion include: European Goalball Club Association; Goalfix Sports (2021); International Paralympic Committee (2024))
Para cross-country skiing	(Canada) Brian McKeever	(Note: Sources or lists that share such an opinion include: Miss604 (2020); CBC Sports (2022); International Olympic Committee (2022))
Paralympics (general)	(United Kingdom) Sarah Storey	(Note: Sources or lists that share such an opinion include: Manchester Metropolitan University (2012); Diario AS (2021); Paralympics GB (2021); ESPN UK (2024); British Cycling (2024))
Paralympics (general)	(United States) Trischa Zorn	(Note: Sources or lists that share such an opinion include: Inside the Games (2012); International Olympic Committee (2021); The Bridge (2021); AFP Sport (2021); WUSF (2023); University of the Sunshine Coast (2024); The Conversation (2024))
Wheelchair basketball	(Canada) Patrick Anderson	(Note: Sources or lists that share such an opinion include: Wheelchair Basketball Canada; NCAA (2021); Basketball Network (2024); NPR (2024))
Paralympic swimming	(Brazil) Daniel Dias	(Note: Sources or lists that share such an opinion include: BBC (2021); El País (2021))

=== Other individual sports ===
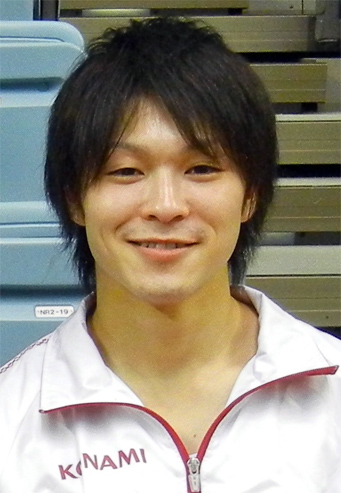
Kohei Uchimura

List of athletes considered the greatest
Sport	Player	Sources
Bodybuilding	(United States) Ronnie Coleman	(Note: Sources or lists that share such an opinion include: Infobae (2021); Meganoticias (2021); Men's Health (2025))
Bodybuilding	(Austria) Arnold Schwarzenegger	(Note: Sources or lists that share such an opinion include: Physical Culture Study (2016); Russ Howe PTI; Men's Health (2024))
Competitive eating (in general and men's)	(United States) Joey Chestnut	(Note: Sources or lists that share such an opinion include: ESPN (2023); The Washington Post (2024); Sports Illustrated (2025); USA Today (2025); WILX-TV (2025))
Competitive eating (women's)	(United States) Miki Sudo	(Note: Sources or lists that share such an opinion include: Pro Football Network (2021); The Athletic (2022), (2024); BroBible (2024))
Figure skating (men's)	(United States) Nathan Chen	(Note: Sources or lists that share such an opinion include: NBC Sports (2022); NPR (2022); Time (2022))
Figure skating (men's)	(Japan) Yuzuru Hanyu	(Note: Sources or lists that share such an opinion include: The New York Times (2018); The Washington Post (2018); Japan Forward (2022))
Figure skating (women's)	(Norway) Sonja Henie	(Note: Sources or lists that share such an opinion include: U.S. Figure Skating (1967); The New York Times (1977); Reuters (2020))
Figure skating (women's)	(South Korea) Yuna Kim	(Note: Sources or lists that share such an opinion include: The Atlantic (2014); NBC Sports (2014); The Chosun Ilbo (2026))
Figure skating (ice dance)	(Canada) Tessa Virtue and Scott Moir	(Note: Sources or lists that share such an opinion include: CBC Sports (2018); Eurosport (2018); U.S. Figure Skating (2018))
Gymnastics (men's)	(Japan) Kohei Uchimura	(Note: Sources or lists that share such an opinion include: CNN (2015); Tokyo Weekender (2016); Business Insider (2016); ESPN (2018), (2024); Associated Press (2021); International Gymnast (2022); The Japan Times (2022); International Olympic Committee (2022))
Gymnastics (in general and women's)	(United States) Simone Biles	(Note: Sources or lists that share such an opinion include: The New Yorker (2016); ESPN (2019); CNN (2021); Texas Standard (2021); PBS News Hour (2023); Inc. (2023); USA Today (2024))
Olympic weightlifting	(Georgia (country)) Lasha Talakhadze	(Note: Sources or lists that share such an opinion include: Fitness Volt (2024); The Barbell (2024))

== List of team sports athletes considered the greatest by position ==
=== American football ===
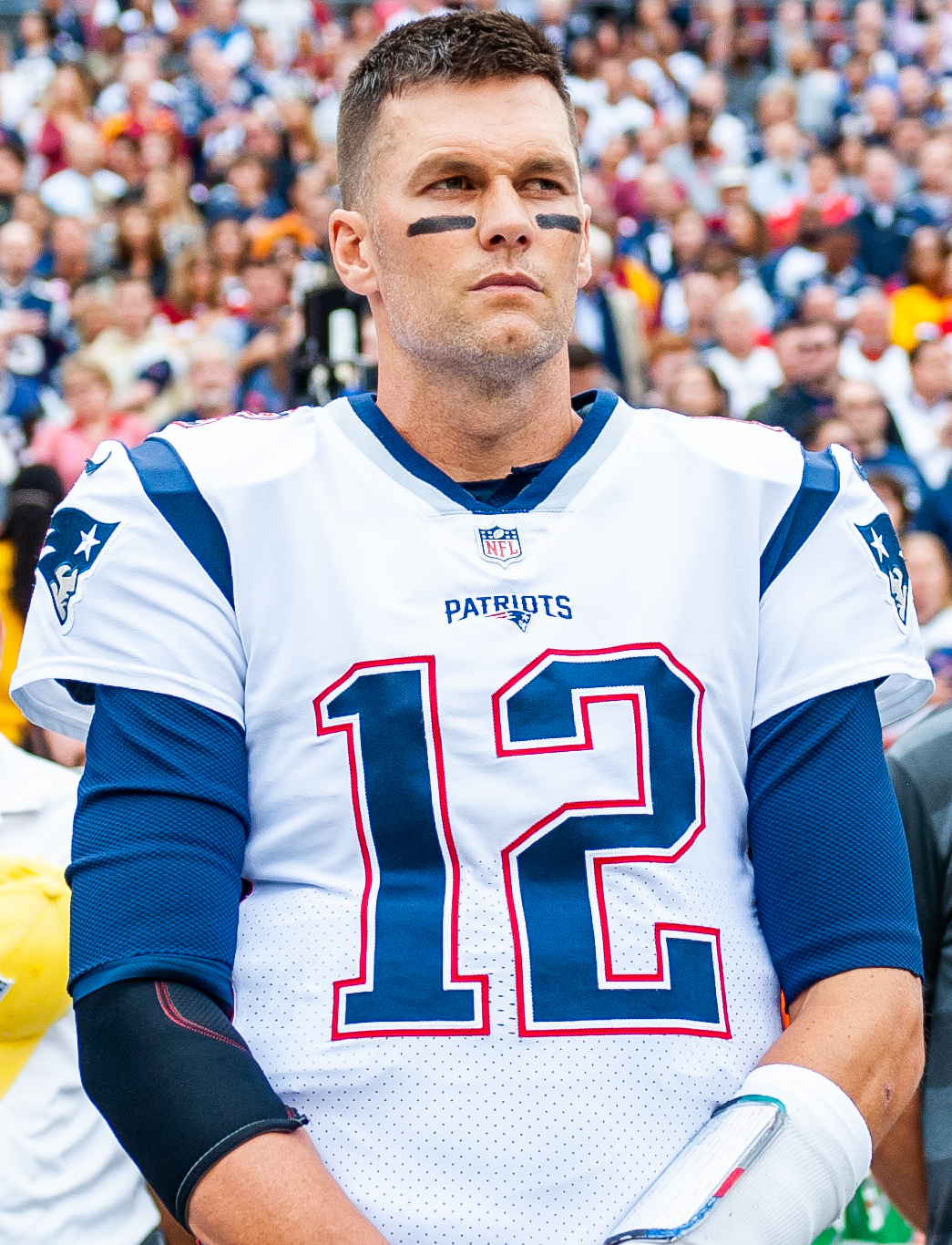
Tom Brady

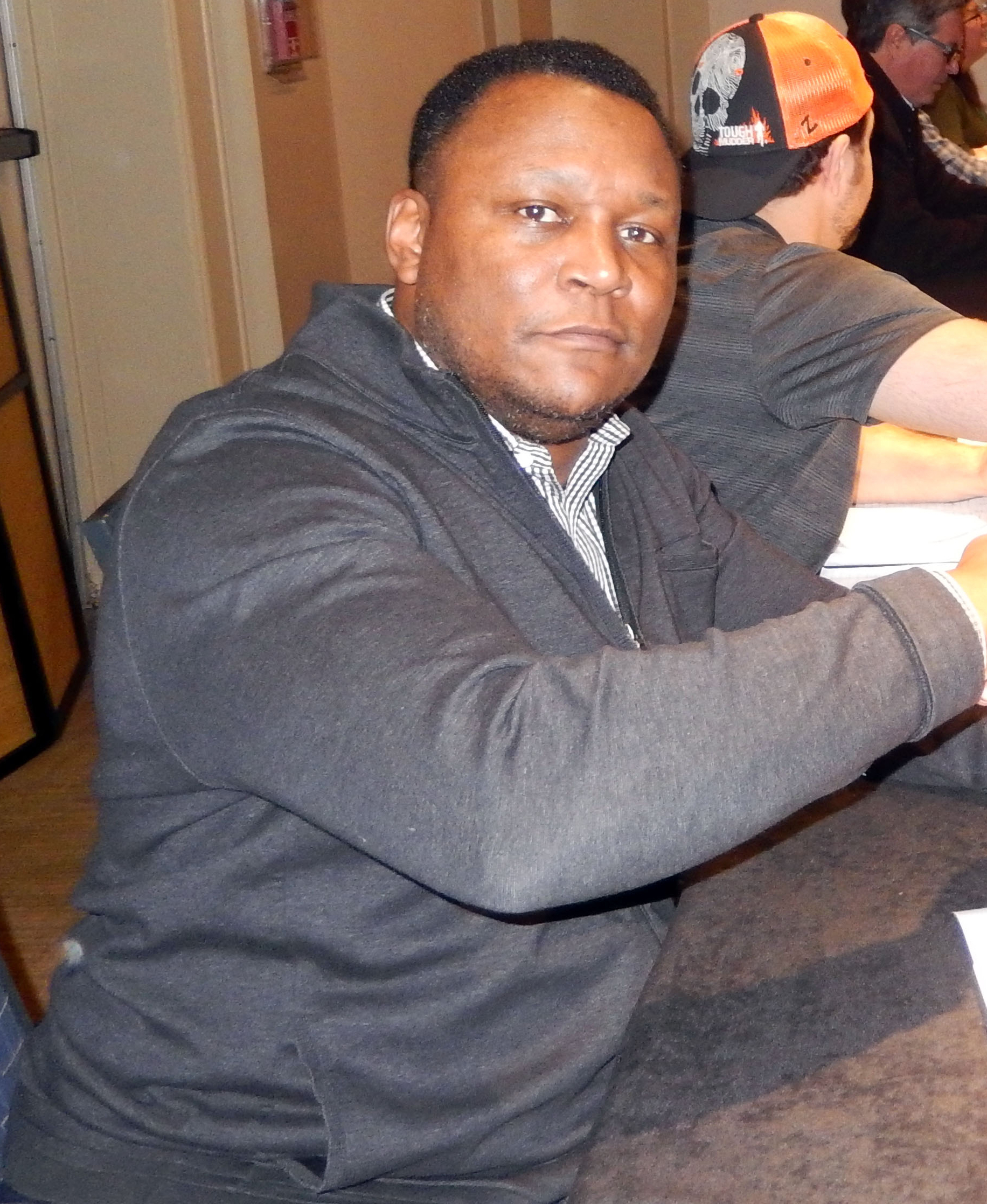
Barry Sanders

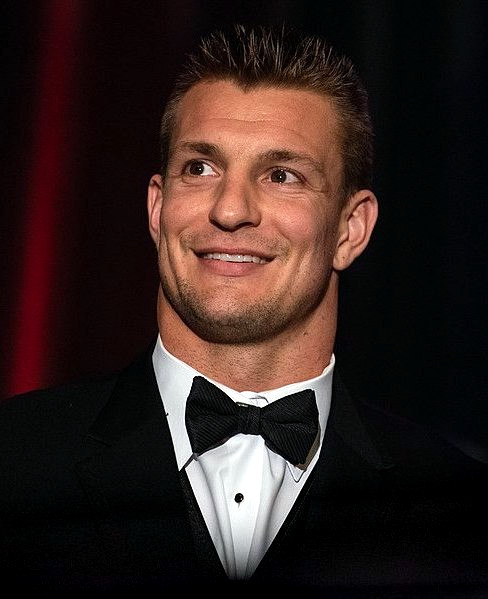
Rob Gronkowski

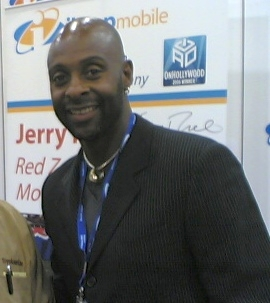
Jerry Rice

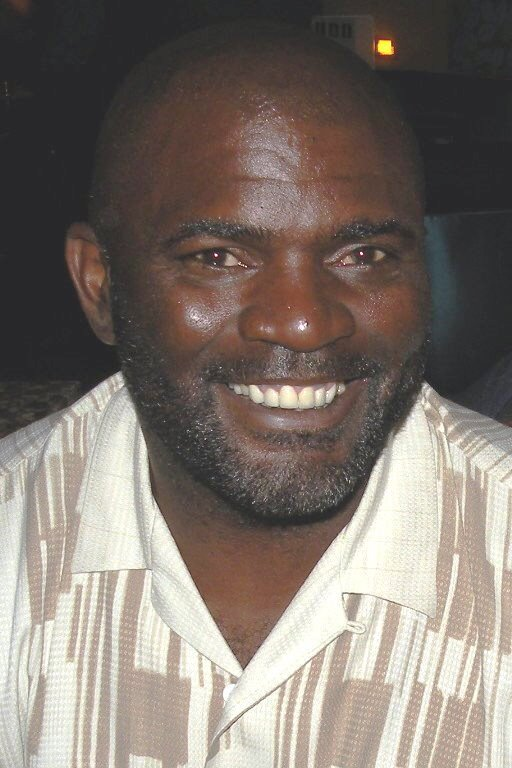
Lawrence Taylor

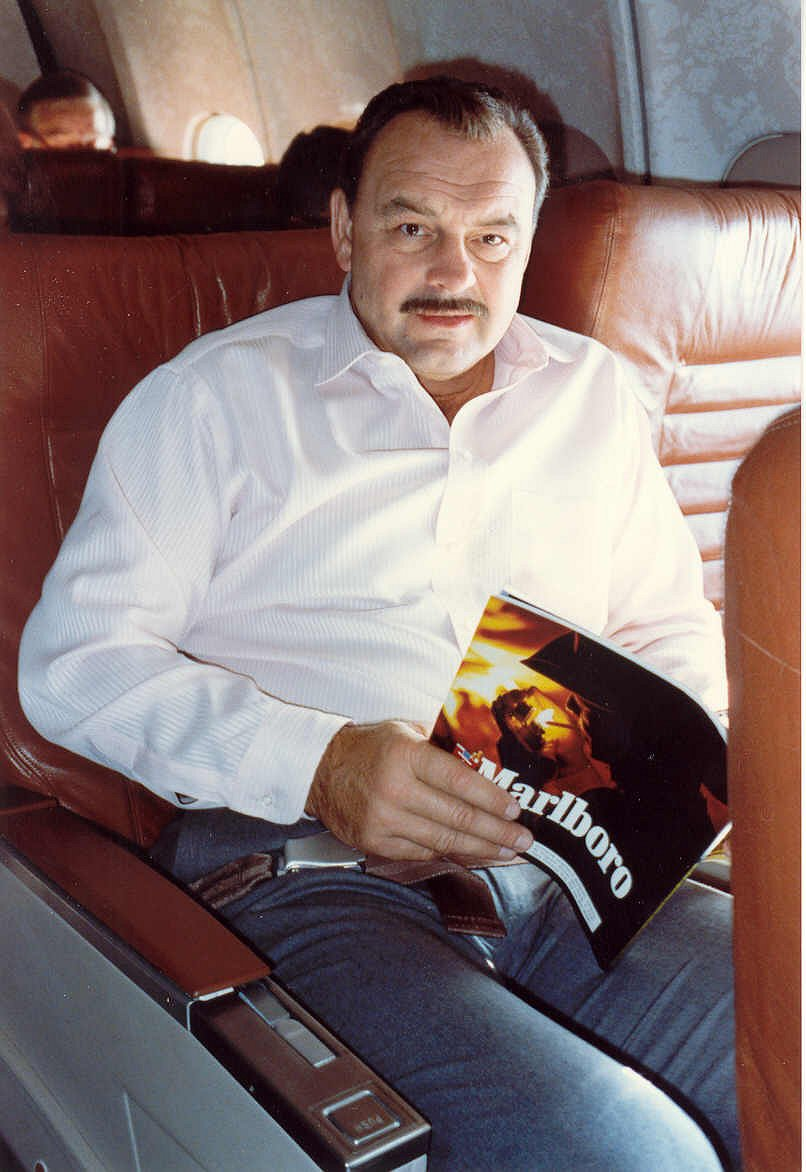
Dick Butkus

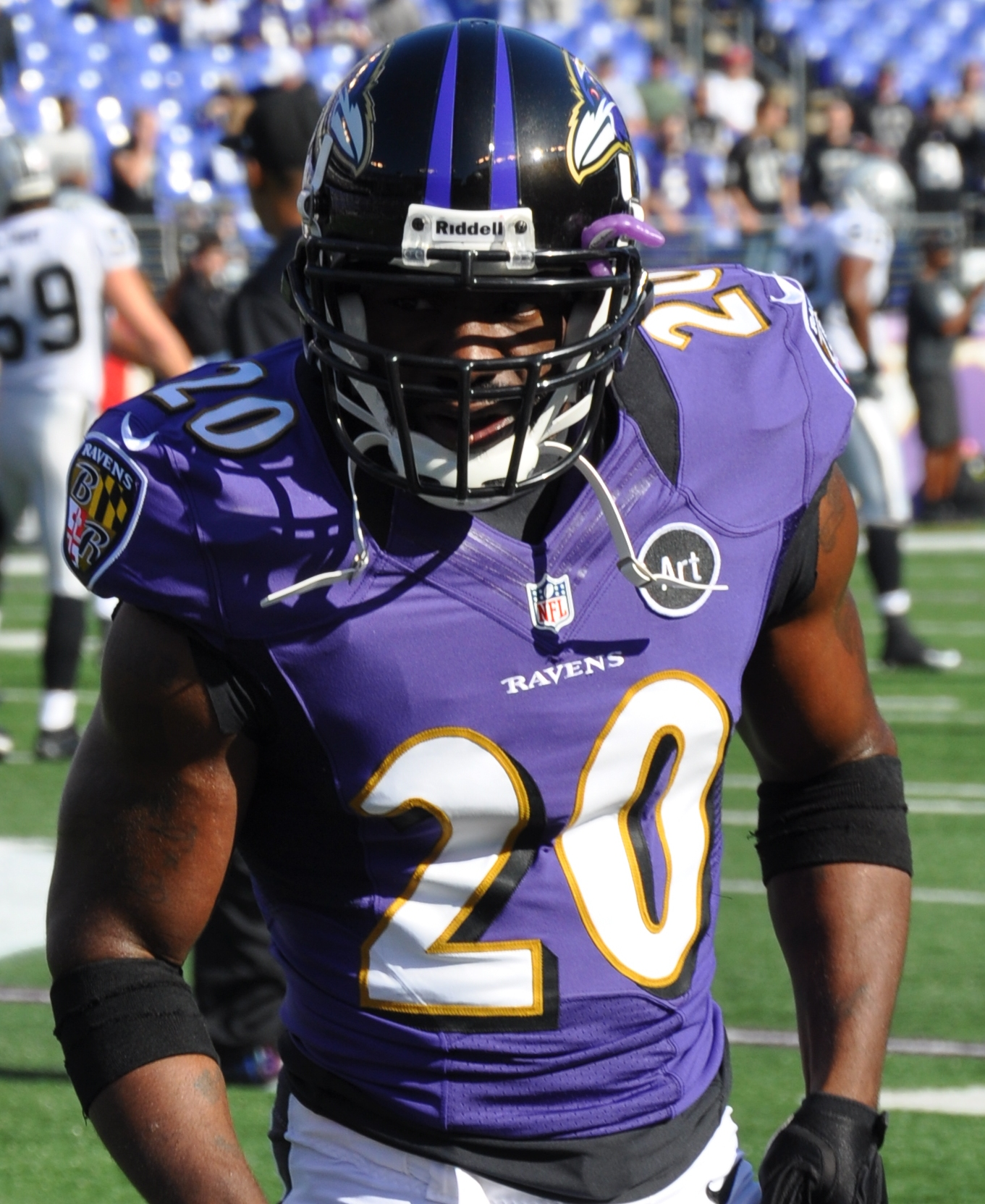
Ed Reed

List of athletes considered the greatest
Position	Player	Sources
Offense
Center	(United States) Jim Otto	(Note: Sources or lists that share such an opinion include: NFL.com (2018); Bleacher Report (2018); Fan Rankings (2022); ESPN (2019), (2022, 13 of 50 panel voters); The Spun (2024); New Arena (2024))
Center	(United States) Mike Webster	(Note: Sources or lists that share such an opinion include: Pro Football Sidekick; ESPN (2022, 15 of 50 panel voters); Stadium Talk (2024); GiveMeSport (2025))
Guard	(United States) Larry Allen	(Note: Sources or lists that share such an opinion include: ESPN (2022, 21 of 50 panel voters); New Arena (2024); Fox Sports (2025))
Guard	(United States) John Hannah	(Note: Sources or lists that share such an opinion include: Pro Football Sidekick; Sports Illustrated (1981); Bleacher Report (2018); ESPN (2019), (2022, 9 of 50 panel voters), (2023))
Guard	(United States) Bruce Matthews	(Note: Sources or lists that share such an opinion include: Pro Football Sidekick; ESPN (2022, 3 of 50 panel voters); ESPN (2023); GiveMeSport (2024); Sideline Shuffle (2024); Stadium Talk (2024))
Guard	(United States) Jim Parker	(Note: Sources or lists that share such an opinion include: NFL.com (2018, as an offensive tackle); ESPN (2019), (2022, 1 of 50 panel voters); Stadium Talk (2024); Talk of Fame Two (2025))
Offensive tackle	(United States) Anthony Muñoz	(Note: Sources or lists that share such an opinion include: Pro Football Sidekick; Bleacher Report (2018); ESPN (2019), (2022, 27 of 50 panel voters); GiveMeSport (2024); Pro Football Network (2024); Stadium Talk (2024); Pro Sports Outlook (2025))
Offensive tackle	(United States) Jonathan Ogden	(Note: Sources or lists that share such an opinion include: Pro Sports Outlook (2021); ESPN (2022, 10 of 50 panel voters); New Arena (2024))
Quarterback	(United States) Tom Brady	(Note: Sources or lists that share such an opinion include: NBC Sports (2017); Bleacher Report (2018); National Review (2019); ESPN (2019), (2022, 44 of 50 panel voters), (2023); Yahoo Sports (2023); CBS Sports (2024 panel); ClutchPoints (2024); New Arena (2024); New York Post panel of six writers (2025); GQ Australia (2025); Athlon Sports (2025); SB Nation (2025); Fox Sports (2025); Talksport (2025))
Quarterback	(United States) Patrick Mahomes	(Note: Sources or lists that share such an opinion include: USA Today (2024); SB Nation (2024); GQ Sports (2024))
Quarterback	(United States) Peyton Manning	(Note: Sources or lists that share such an opinion include: Football Perspective (2014); Sports Central (2015); FiveThirtyEight (2015); USA Today Sports (2016); ESPN (2022, 2 of 50 panel voters))
Quarterback	(United States) Joe Montana	(Note: Sources or lists that share such an opinion include: NFL Films (2016); Bleacher Report (2018); ESPN (2022, 4 of 50 panel voters))
Quarterback	(United States) Aaron Rodgers	(Note: Sources or lists that share such an opinion include: Sports Illustrated Kids (2011); CBS News (2014); Bleacher Report (2018); ClutchPoints (2018))
Running back	(United States) Jim Brown	(Note: Sources or lists that share such an opinion include: Electro-Mech Scoreboard; Pro Football Sidekick; Sports Central (2010); NFL.com (2017); Yardbarker (2018); 247Sports (2019); ESPN (2019), (2022, 23 of 50 panel voters); Audacy (2021); ClutchPoints (2023); GiveMeSport (2024); Pro Football Network (2024); New Arena (2024); Athlon Sports (2025); CU Independent (2025))
Running back	(United States) Walter Payton	(Note: Sources or lists that share such an opinion include: ESPN (2019), (2022, 6 of 50 panel voters); BroBible (2022); Heavy Sports (2024); The Prowl (2024))
Running back	(United States) Barry Sanders	(Note: Sources or lists that share such an opinion include: Bleacher Report (2018); SB Nation (2019); LWOSports (2020); ESPN (2022, 14 of 50 panel voters))
Running back	(United States) Emmitt Smith	(Note: Sources or lists that share such an opinion include: The Sportster (2022); ESPN (2022, 3 of 50 panel voters); Talksport (2025); Fox Sports (2025))
Tight end	(United States) Rob Gronkowski	(Note: Sources or lists that share such an opinion include: USA Today Sports (2019); The Ringer (2019); ESPN (2022, 23 of 50 panel voters); Deadspin (2024); Stadium Talk (2024); Sportsnaut (2025); CBS Sports (2025); Talk of Fame Two (2025))
Tight end	(United States) Tony Gonzalez	(Note: Sources or lists that share such an opinion include: Pro Football Sidekick; Bleacher Report (2018); ESPN (2019), (2022, 21 of 50 panel voters), (2023); CBS Sports (2024 panel); New Arena (2024); GiveMeSport (2025); Fox Sports (2025); Talksport (2025))
Wide receiver	(United States) Don Hutson	(Note: Sources or lists that share such an opinion include: Pro Football Sidekick; Sports Illustrated (1995); ESPN (2019), (2022, 1 of 50 panel voters); Talk of Fame Two (2020); Stadium Talk (2024))
Wide receiver	(United States) Randy Moss	(Note: Sources or lists that share such an opinion include: The Shadow League (2016); SB Nation (2018); NFL receiver Tyreek Hill (2020); ESPN (2022, 4 of 50 panel voters))
Wide receiver	(United States) Jerry Rice	(Note: Sources or lists that share such an opinion include: Pro Football Sidekick; ESPN (2008, 7 of 7 panel voters), (2019), (2022, 45 of 50 panel voters), (2023); Bleacher Report (2018); USA Today Sports (2024); New Arena (2024); The Ringer (2024); Stadium Talk (2024); GiveMeSport (2025); Fox Sports (2025); Talksport (2025))
Defense
Defense (general)	(United States) Lawrence Taylor	(Note: Sources or lists that share such an opinion include: NFL.com (2016); Lineups (2020); Campus Sports (2022); Yahoo Sports (2024); The Grueling Truth (2024); Gridiron Heroics (2024); Franchise Sports (2024); SportsBoom (2025))
Cornerback	(United States) Mel Blount	(Note: Sources or lists that share such an opinion include: 247Sports (2019); Sports History Network (2021); ESPN (2022, 1 of 50 panel voters))
Cornerback	(United States) Night Train Lane	(Note: Sources or lists that share such an opinion include: Pro Football Sidekick; Pro Football Hall of Fame (1969); The Dallas Morning News (2010); Bleacher Report (2018); Stadium Talk (2024))
Cornerback	(United States) Deion Sanders	(Note: Sources or lists that share such an opinion include: Bleacher Report (2017); NFL.com (2017); ESPN (2019), (2022, 32 of 50 panel voters); Sports History Network (2021); Pro Football Network (2024); USA Today Sports (2024); New Arena (2024); Stadium Talk (2024); Fox Sports (2025); Sportsnaut (2025))
Cornerback	(United States) Rod Woodson	(Note: Sources or lists that share such an opinion include: Pro Football Sidekick; ESPN (2019), (2022, 1 of 50 panel voters); ClutchPoints (2023); Pro Football Network (2024); Athlon Sports (2024))
Defensive tackle	(United States) Aaron Donald	(Note: Sources or lists that share such an opinion include: ESPN (2022, 39 of 50 panel voters); ESPN (2023); SidelineShuffle (2024); Pro Football Network (2024); USA Today Sports (2024); New Arena (2024); Pro Sports Outlook (2024))
Defensive tackle	(United States) Joe Greene	(Note: Sources or lists that share such an opinion include: Pro Football Sidekick; Sports H2H (2021); Fan Rankings (2021); ESPN (2019), (2022, 5 of 50 panel voters); Stadium Talk (2024))
Defensive tackle	(United States) Bob Lilly	(Note: Sources or lists that share such an opinion include: NFL.com (2017); Bleacher Report (2018); Pro Football Network (2024); Stadium Talk (2024))
Defensive tackle	(United States) Alan Page	(Note: Sources or lists that share such an opinion include: Pro Football Sidekick; Bleacher Report (2018); ESPN (2022, 1 of 50 panel voters))
Edge rusher	(United States) Bruce Smith	(Note: Sources or lists that share such an opinion include: ESPN (2022, 1 of 50 panel voters); New Arena (2024); Stadium Talk (2024); Fox Sports (2025))
Edge rusher	(United States) Lawrence Taylor	(Note: Sources or lists that share such an opinion include: Talk of Fame Two (2017); ESPN (2022, 40 of 50 panel voters), ESPN (2023); Pro Football Network (2024), (2024); The Big Lead (2025))
Edge rusher	(United States) Reggie White	(Note: Sources or lists that share such an opinion include: Pro Football Sidekick; NFL.com (2017); Bleacher Report (2018); ESPN (2019), (2022, 8 of 50 panel voters); CBS Sports (2024); Pro Football Network (2024); New Arena (2024); Stadium Talk (2024); Athlon Sports (2025))
Linebacker	(United States) Dick Butkus	(Note: Sources or lists that share such an opinion include: Pro Football Sidekick; ESPN (2019), (2022, 13 of 50 panel voters); Pro Football Network (2024); USA Today Sports (2024))
Linebacker	(United States) Ray Lewis	(Note: Sources or lists that share such an opinion include: Pro Football Sidekick; Bleacher Report (2018); ESPN (2022, 23 of 50 panel voters); Pro Football Network (2024); New Arena (2024); Stadium Talk (2024); Fox Sports (2025))
Linebacker	(United States) Lawrence Taylor	(Note: Sources or lists that share such an opinion include: Pro Football Sidekick; Bleacher Report (2018); ESPN (2019); ClutchPoints (2023); New Arena (2024); SidelineShuffle (2024); Pro Football Network (2024); Stadium Talk (2024); Athlon Sports (2025))
Safety	(United States) Ronnie Lott	(Note: Sources or lists that share such an opinion include: Pro Football Sidekick; Bleacher Report (2018); ESPN (2019), (2022, 27 of 50 panel voters); SidelineShuffle (2024); Pro Football Network (2024), (2024); New Arena (2024); The Grueling Truth (2024); Athlon Sports (2024); Stadium Talk (2024); GiveMeSport (2025); Fox Sports (2025))
Safety	(United States) Ed Reed	(Note: Sources or lists that share such an opinion include: Pro Football Sidekick; Yahoo Sports (2011); Russell Street Report (2021); ESPN (2022, 15 of 50 panel voters); Pro Football Network (2024); New Arena (2024))
Safety	(United States) Emlen Tunnell	(Note: Sources or lists that share such an opinion include: NFL.com (2017); Talk of Fame Two (2017); Sports Injury Central (2022))
Special teams
Gunner	(United States) Matthew Slater	(Note: Sources or lists that share such an opinion include: ESPN (2022, 3 of 50 panel voters for "Returner/Special Teamer"); Pats Pulpit (2024); NBC Sports Boston (2024))
Gunner	(United States) Steve Tasker	(Note: Sources or lists that share such an opinion include: BuffaLowDown (2016); Bleacher Report (2018))
Kicker	(United States) Justin Tucker	(Note: Sources or lists that share such an opinion include: NFL.com (2017); ESPN (2022, 21 of 50 panel voters for "Kicker/Punter"); New Arena (2024); Athlon Sports (2025))
Kicker	(United States) Adam Vinatieri	(Note: Sources or lists that share such an opinion include: Bleacher Report (2018); ESPN (2019), (2022, 22 of 50 panel voters for "Kicker/Punter"), (2023); Pro Football Network (2024); Stadium Talk (2024); Fox Sports (2025))
Punter	(United States) Ray Guy	(Note: Sources or lists that share such an opinion include: Bleacher Report (2018); ESPN (2019), (2022, 6 of 50 panel voters for "Kicker/Punter"); New Arena (2024); GiveMeSport (2025); Fox Sports (2025))
Return specialist (Kick or punt returner)	(United States) Devin Hester	(Note: Sources or lists that share such an opinion include: SB Nation (2017); Yardbarker (2017); Bleacher Report (2018); ESPN (2022, 29 of 50 panel voters for "Returner/Special Teamer"); The Grueling Truth (2023); Pro Football Network (2024); New Arena (2024); Franchise Sports (2024); GiveMeSport (2024); BetUS (2024); Stadium Talk (2024))
Return specialist (Kick or punt returner)	(United States) Cordarrelle Patterson	(Note: Sources or lists that share such an opinion include: Talk of Fame Two (2023); ESPN (2023); Stadium Talk (2024))
Return specialist (Kick or punt returner)	(United States) Gale Sayers	(Note: Sources or lists that share such an opinion include: Hall of Fame selection committee (2000); Sports Central (2011); Bleacher Report (2018); ESPN (2022, 5 of 50 panel voters for "Returner/Special Teamer"))

=== Association football ===
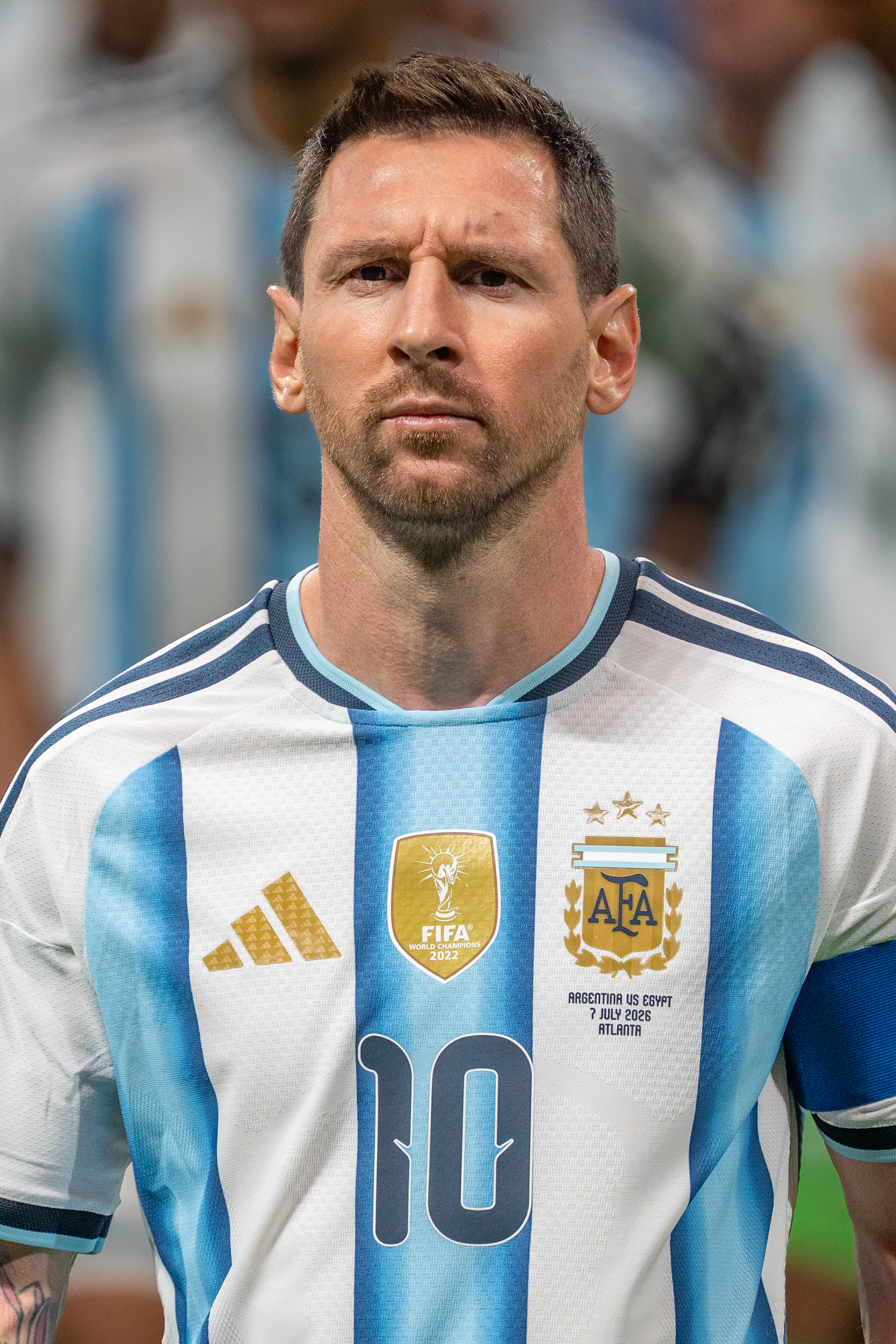
Lionel Messi

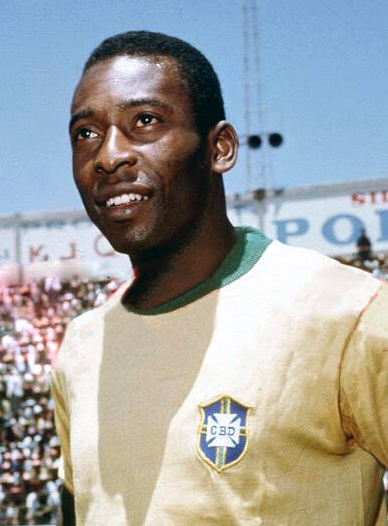
Pelé

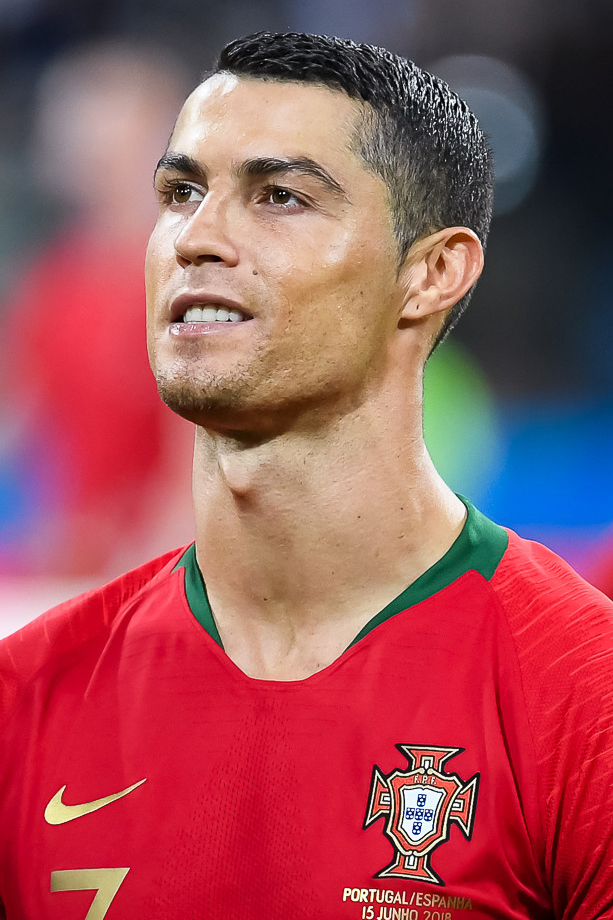
Cristiano Ronaldo

List of athletes considered the greatest
Position	Player	Sources
Goalkeeper	(Soviet Union) Lev Yashin	(Note: Sources or lists that share such an opinion include: Wheecorea; A Tarde Newspaper (2004); World Soccer - World Soccer (2013); O Estado de São Paulo Newspaper (2013); Bleacher Report (2018), (2020); OneFootball (2020); The Roar (2020); Ballon d'Or Dream Team - France Football (2020); All-time Dream Team - IFFHS (2021); Khel Now (2023); FourFourTwo (2024); Stadium Talk (2024); GiveMeSport (2025))
Goalkeeper	(Italy) Gianluigi Buffon	(Note: Sources or lists that share such an opinion include: ESPN (2016); IFFHS (2023); Goal.com (2023); Forbes (2023); Sports Mole (2025))
Goalkeeper	(Spain) Iker Casillas	(Note: Sources or lists that share such an opinion include: Marca (2014); Diario AS (2021); The Spartan Shield (2023); Sports Illustrated (2025))
Goalkeeper	(Germany) Manuel Neuer	(Note: Sources or lists that share such an opinion include: Everybody Soccer (2014); ESPN (2020); Yahoo Sports (2020))
Goalkeeper (sweeper keeper)	(Germany) Manuel Neuer	(Note: Sources or lists that share such an opinion include: 90min (2020); GiveMeSport (2024))
Defender (general)	(West Germany) Franz Beckenbauer	(Note: Sources or lists that share such an opinion include: Goal.com (2024); Frontline magazine (2024); Stadium Talk (2024); Sports Mole (2025))
Defender (general)	(Italy) Paolo Maldini	(Note: Sources or lists that share such an opinion include: Ranker fan poll (2020); The Spartan Shield (2023); SportsBoom (2024); Stadium Talk (2024); Sports Illustrated (2025); OneTurf News (2025); GiveMeSport fan poll (2025))
Defender (Right-back)	(Brazil) Cafu	(Note: Sources or lists that share such an opinion include: Wheecorea; Bleacher Report (2009), (2020); Khel Now (2023); 90min (2024); GiveMeSport (2025))
Defender (Right-back)	(Brazil) Dani Alves	(Note: Sources or lists that share such an opinion include: Football Faithful (2017); Goal.com (2019); Barca Universal (2020); Cheap Goals (2023); Football Ground Guide (2024))
Defender (left-back)	(Italy) Paolo Maldini	(Note: Sources or lists that share such an opinion include: Wheecorea; Bleacher Report (2018), (2020); Ballon d'Or Dream Team - France Football (2020); Khel Now (2023), (2025); FourFourTwo (2024), (2025); 90min (2024); GiveMeSport (2025))
Defender (left-back)	(Brazil) Roberto Carlos	(Note: Sources or lists that share such an opinion include: Khel Now (2023); Seu Melhor Jogo (2024))
Defender (Centre-back)	(West Germany) Franz Beckenbauer	(Note: Sources or lists that share such an opinion include: World Soccer (magazine)#Greatest XI of All Time - World Soccer (2013); Bleacher Report (2018), (2020), (2025): Ballon d'Or Dream Team - France Football (2020); The Roar (2020); New Arena (2024); FourFourTwo (2024); The Football Yeller (2024); Pulse Sports Kenya (2025); GiveMeSport (2025))
Defender (Centre-back)	(Italy) Franco Baresi	(Note: Sources or lists that share such an opinion include: Bleacher Report (2018); The Roar (2020); FourFourTwo (2025))
Midfielder (general)	(Netherlands) Johan Cruyff	(Note: Sources or lists that share such an opinion include: Bleacher Report (2018); The Athletic (2020); Football Say (2024))
Midfielder (general)	(Argentina) Diego Maradona	(Note: Sources or lists that share such an opinion include: The Top Tens; O Estado de S. Paulo; World Soccer (magazine)#Greatest XI of All Time - World Soccer (2013); Globe Independent (2025); GiveMeSport (2025))
Midfielder (general)	(France) Zinedine Zidane	(Note: Sources or lists that share such an opinion include: Bleacher Report (2018); The Sports Economist (2024); Sports Illustrated (2025); Sports Tiger (2025); Sports Mole (2025))
Defensive midfielder	(Germany) Lothar Matthäus	(Note: Sources or lists that share such an opinion include: Bleacher Report (2009); SportsBoom (2024); FourFourTwo (2024); Sholy Nation Sport (2025); Lente Desportiva (2025); Khel Now (2025); GiveMeSport (2025))
Defensive midfielder	(France) Claude Makelele	(Note: Sources or lists that share such an opinion include: Best Midfielder (2025))
Defensive midfielder	(Spain) Sergio Busquets	(Note: Sources or lists that share such an opinion include: Think Football Ideas (2025); Zonal Sports (2025))
Left winger	(Portugal) Cristiano Ronaldo	(Note: Sources or lists that share such an opinion include: Khel Now (2023); FourFourTwo (2025); GiveMeSport (2025); Lente Desportiva (2025))
Right Winger	(Argentina) Lionel Messi	(Note: Sources or lists that share such an opinion include: Aftcc2; GiveMeSport (2020), (2025); FourFourTwo (2025); Lente DeSportiva (2025))
Winger (general)	(Brazil) Garrincha	(Note: Sources or lists that share such an opinion include: Bleacher Report (2018); The Guardian (2018); FourFourTwo (2023); GiveMeSport (2025))
Attacking midfielder	(Argentina) Diego Maradona	(Note: Sources or lists that share such an opinion include: Sports Big News (2021); 90min (2024); GiveMeSport (2025); Lente Desportiva (2025))
Forward (general)	(Argentina) Lionel Messi	(Note: Sources or lists that share such an opinion include: The Spartan Shield (2023); Stadium Talk (2024); Sports Illustrated (2025); Modded (2025); Sports Mole (2025))
Forward (Striker)	(Brazil) Pelé	(Note: Sources or lists that share such an opinion include: O Estado de S. Paulo; World Soccer (magazine)#Greatest XI of All Time - World Soccer (2013); Bleacher Report (2018), (2020); (2025): New Arena (2024); FourFourTwo (2025); GiveMeSport (2025))
Forward (Striker)	(Brazil) Ronaldo	(Note: Sources or lists that share such an opinion include: Ballon d'Or Dream Team - France Football (2020); Sportco (2020))

=== Baseball ===
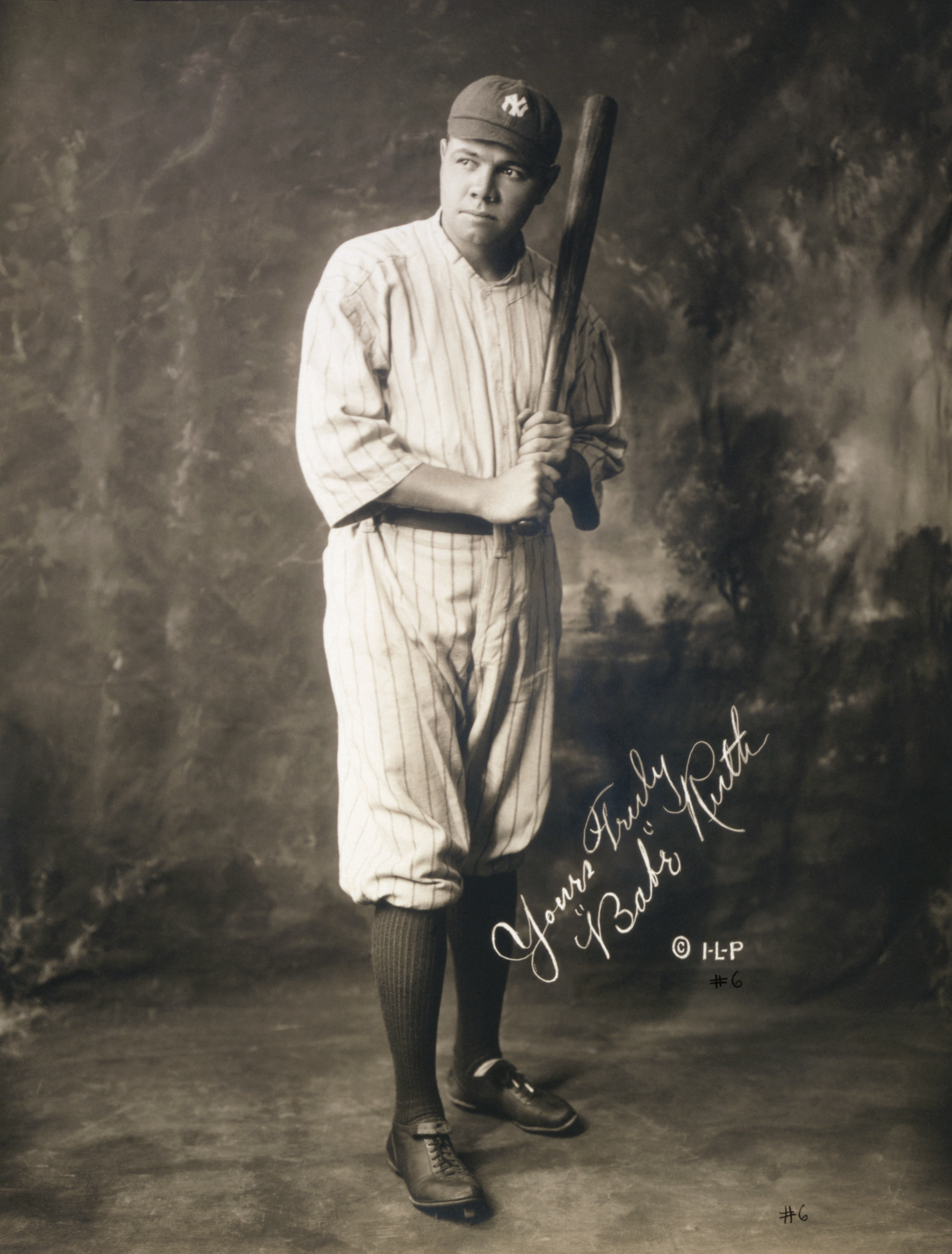
Babe Ruth

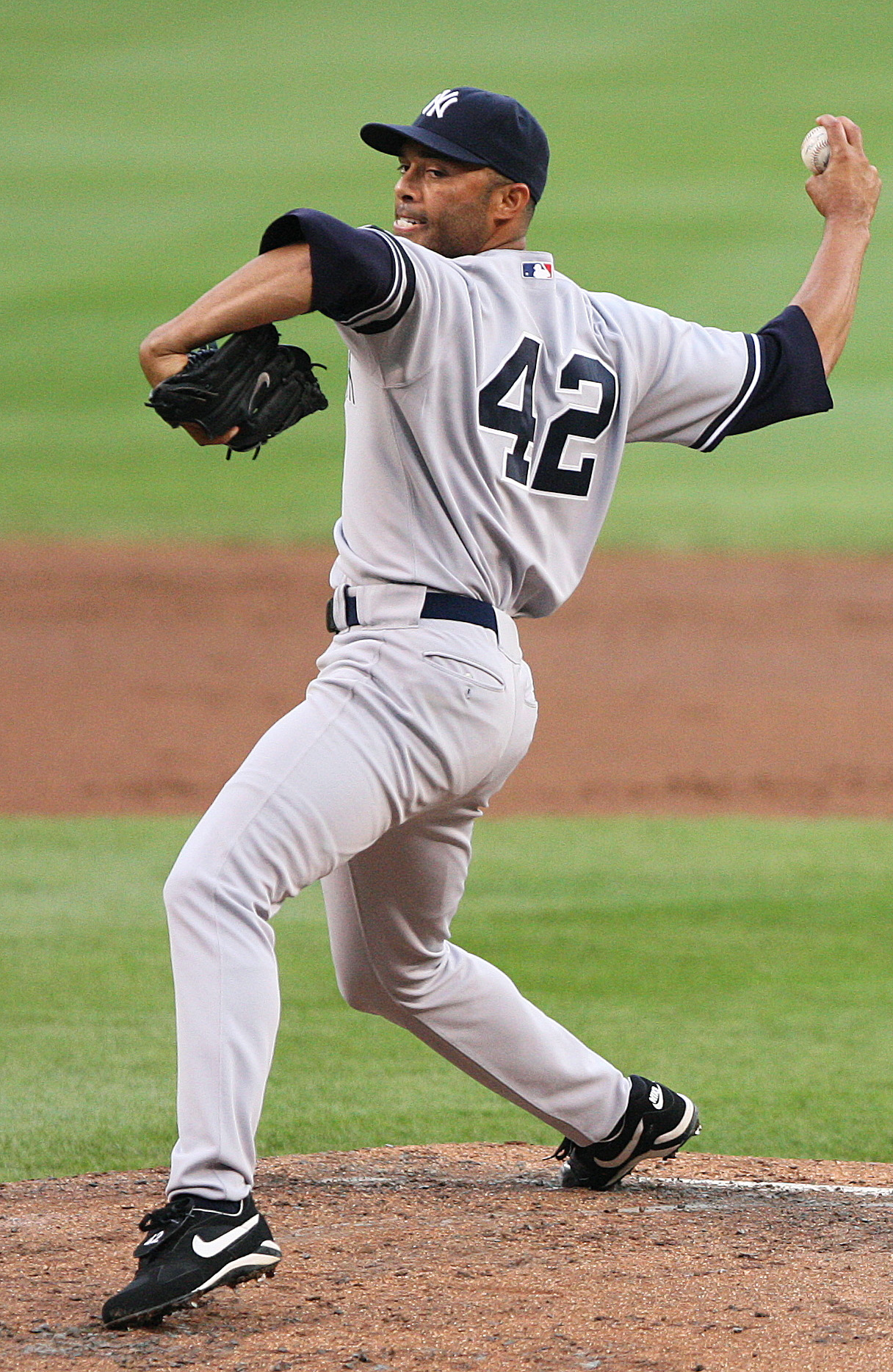
Mariano Rivera

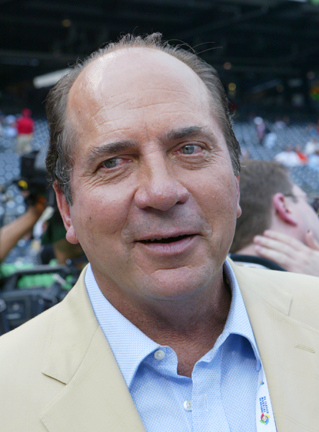
Johnny Bench

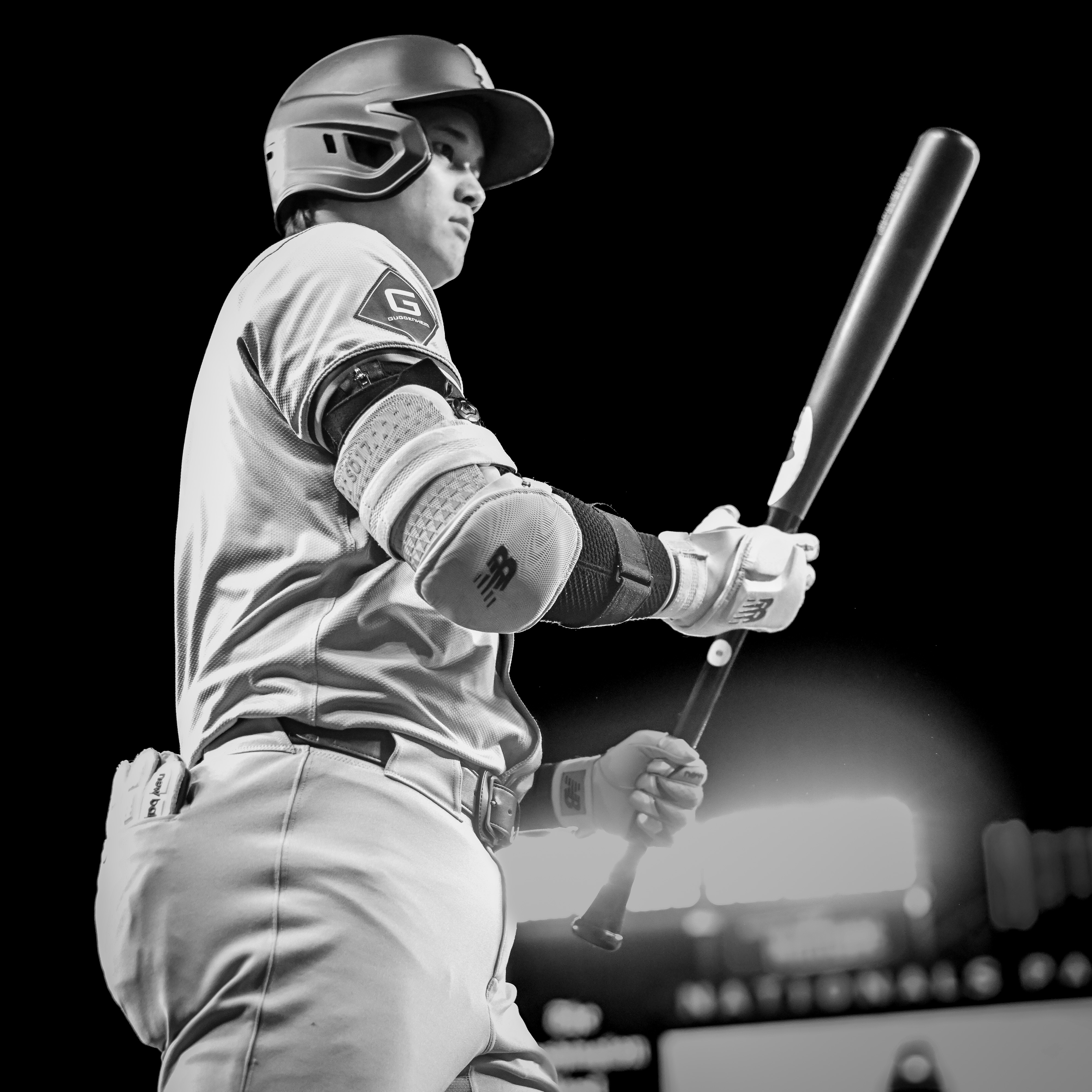
Shohei Ohtani

List of athletes considered the greatest
Position	Player	Sources
Battery
1 (Pitcher), general	(United States) Roger Clemens	(Note: Sources or lists that share such an opinion include: New York Post (2003); theScore (2018))
1 (Pitcher), general	(United States) Walter Johnson	(Note: Sources or lists that share such an opinion include: The Hardball Times (2007); ESPN (2016); Audacy (2021); Yen News (2022); Pitcher List (2022); Modded (2025))
1 (Pitcher), general	(United States) Cy Young	(Note: Sources or lists that share such an opinion include: Astros Daily (2004); RealClearHistory (2021); CU Independent (2025))
Starting pitcher	(United States) Walter Johnson	(Note: Sources or lists that share such an opinion include: Athlon Sports (2017); Bleacher Report (2011), New Baseball Media (2024); The Big Lead (2025))
Starting pitcher	(United States) Sandy Koufax	(Note: Sources or lists that share such an opinion include: The Sport Digest (2016); New Arena (2024); Franchise Sports (2024); Sportsnaut (2025))
Relief pitcher (general)	(Panama) Mariano Rivera	(Note: Sources or lists that share such an opinion include: Bleacher Report (2011), (2012), (2018); ESPN (2019); AZ Snake Pit (2022); Pitcher List (2022); New Baseball Media (2023); Modded (2025))
Closer	(Panama) Mariano Rivera	(Note: Sources or lists that share such an opinion include: The Sport Digest (2016); Athlon Sports (2017); Bleacher Report (2018); Call to the Pen (2023); Inside Hook (2023); Humm Baby Baseball (2024); The Grueling Truth (2024); Yardbarker (2024); Al Bat (2025))
2 (Catcher)	(United States) Johnny Bench	(Note: Sources or lists that share such an opinion include: ESPN (2016); The Sport Digest (2016); Bleacher Report (2011), (2018); theScore panel (2018); Audacy (2022); Franchise Sports (2022); New Arena (2024); The Grueling Truth (2024); Sports Illustrated (2025))
Infield
3 (First baseman)	(United States) Lou Gehrig	(Note: Sources or lists that share such an opinion include: ESPN (2016); The Sport Digest (2016); Athlon Sports (2017); Bleacher Report (2011), (2018); theScore panel (2018); Yahoo Sports (2020); Audacy (2021); Pitcher List (2022); Ballpark Savvy (2025))
3 (First baseman)	(Dominican Republic) Albert Pujols	(Note: Sources or lists that share such an opinion include: Pro Sports Outlook (2022); Franchise Sports (2024); The Big Lead (2025))
4 (Second baseman)	(United States) Rogers Hornsby	(Note: Sources or lists that share such an opinion include: ESPN (2016); Bleacher Report (2011), (2018); theScore panel (2018); Yahoo Sports (2020); Audacy (2021); Pro Sports Outlook (2022); Pitcher List (2022); Franchise Sports (2022); New Baseball Media (2024); The Grueling Truth (2024); Humm Baby Baseball (2025); Ballpark Savvy (2025))
5 (Third baseman)	(United States) Mike Schmidt	(Note: Sources or lists that share such an opinion include: ESPN (2016); Athlon Sports (2017); Bleacher Report (2011), (2018); Yahoo Sports (2020); Audacy (2021); Pitcher List (2022); Franchise Sports (2023); USA Today (2023); New Baseball Media (2024); Ballpark Savvy (2025); Humm Baby Baseball (2025))
6 (Shortstop)	(United States) Cal Ripken Jr.	(Note: Sources or lists that share such an opinion include: AZ Snake Pit (2022); New Baseball Media (2024); Stadium Talk (2024); Humm Baby Baseball (2025))
6 (Shortstop)	(United States) Alex Rodriguez	(Note: Sources or lists that share such an opinion include: Through The Fence Baseball; ESPN columnist Rob Neyer (2003); The Sport Digest (2016); theScore panel (2018); Audacy (2022))
6 (Shortstop)	(United States) Honus Wagner	(Note: Sources or lists that share such an opinion include: Sports Central (2011); CBS Sports (2012); ESPN (2016); Athlon Sports (2017); Bleacher Report (2011), (2018); Yahoo Sports (2020); Fueled by Sports (2022); Pitcher List (2022); Franchise Sports (2022); New Arena (2024); The Grueling Truth (2024))
Outfield
General	(United States) Babe Ruth	(Note: Sources or lists that share such an opinion include: Athlon Sports (2017); theScore panel (2018); Bleacher Report (2018); Fueled by Sports (2022); This Day In Baseball (2022); Franchise Sports (2022))
7 (Left fielder)	(United States) Barry Bonds	(Note: Sources or lists that share such an opinion include: Audacy (2022); This Day In Baseball (2022); Pitcher List (2022); Humm Baby Baseball (2025))
7 (Left fielder)	(United States) Ted Williams	(Note: Sources or lists that share such an opinion include: ESPN (2016); Bleacher Report (2011), (2018); Yahoo Sports (2020); The Grueling Truth (2025); Ballpark Savvy (2025))
8 (Center fielder)	(United States) Willie Mays	(Note: Sources or lists that share such an opinion include: ESPN (2016); The Sport Digest (2016); Bleacher Report (2011), (2018); Yahoo Sports (2020); Audacy (2022); Pitcher List (2022); This Day In Baseball (2022); Franchise Sports (2023); The Grueling Truth (2024); Ballpark Savvy (2025); Humm Baby Baseball (2025))
9 (Right fielder)	(United States) Babe Ruth	(Note: Sources or lists that share such an opinion include: ESPN (2016); Bleacher Report (2011), (2018); Yahoo Sports (2020); Audacy (2022); Pitcher List (2022); The Skippers View (2025); Humm Baby Baseball (2025))
Other positions
Designated hitter	(United States) Edgar Martínez	(Note: Sources or lists that share such an opinion include: MLB.com; SB Nation (2013); Sports Illustrated (2016); Bleacher Report (2011), (2018); Franchise Sports (2022); New Arena (2024); Yardbarker (2024))
Designated hitter	(Japan) Shohei Ohtani	(Note: Sources or lists that share such an opinion include: USA Today (2025); Newsweek (2025))
Designated hitter	(Dominican Republic) David Ortiz	(Note: Sources or lists that share such an opinion include: Yardbarker (2016); Athlon Sports (2017); Pro Sports Outlook (2022))
Designated hitter	(United States) Frank Thomas	(Note: Sources or lists that share such an opinion include: Baseball Egg (2024))

=== Basketball ===
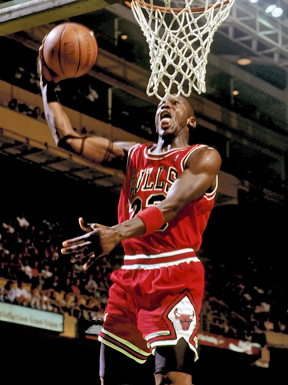
Michael Jordan

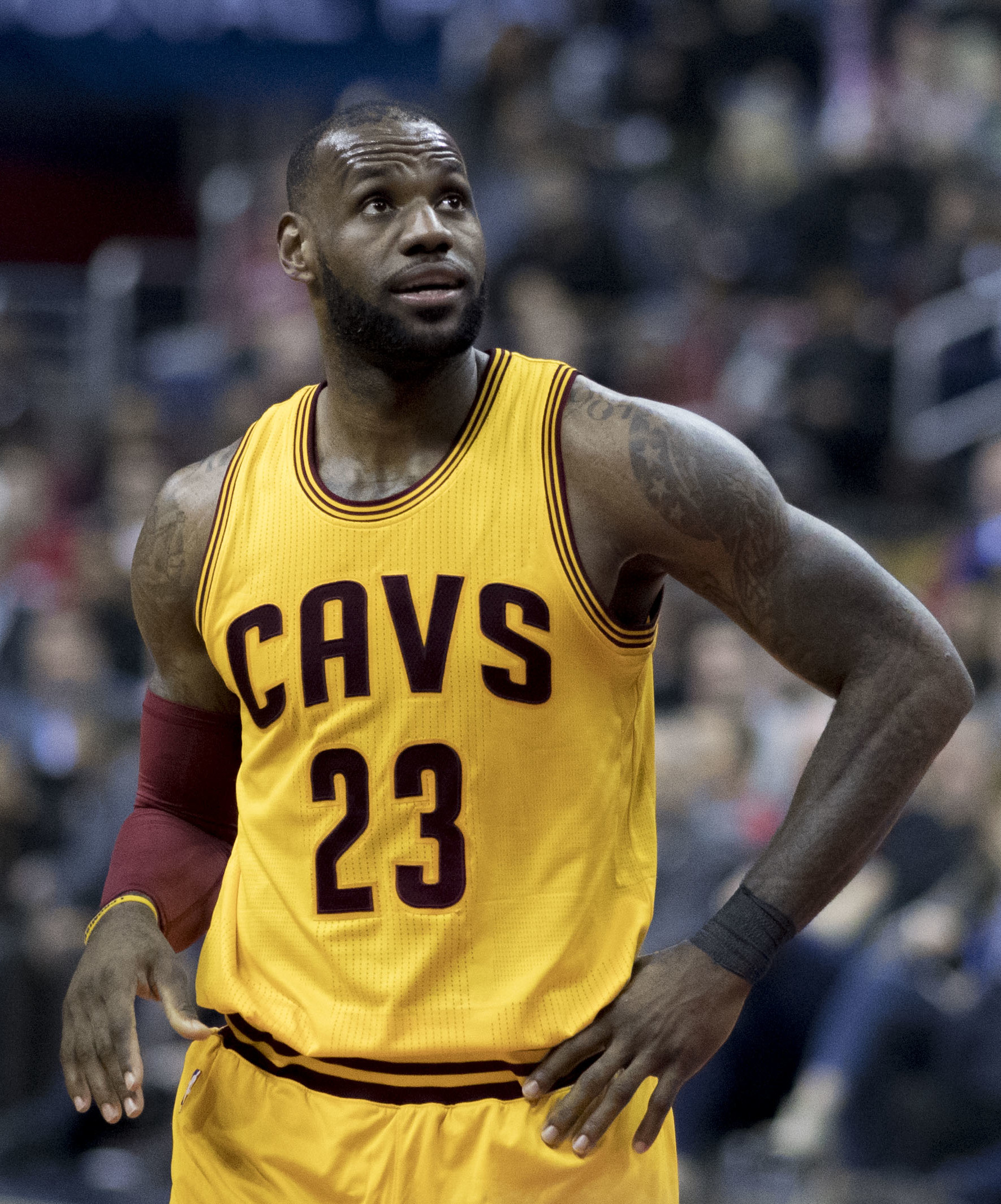
LeBron James

List of athletes considered the greatest
Position	Player	Sources
Point guard	(United States) Stephen Curry	(Note: Sources or lists that share such an opinion include: BasketNews (2024); ClutchPoints (2024); Beaver Tales (2025))
Point guard	(United States) Magic Johnson	(Note: Sources or lists that share such an opinion include: ESPN panel (2016); Bleacher Report (2019); Last Word On Sports (2020); Lineups (2023); USA Today Sports (2024); HoopsHype (2024); The Sportster (2024); Heavy Sports (2024); Basketball.com.au (2025); GiveMeSport (2025); Fadeaway World (2025))
Shooting guard	(United States) Michael Jordan	(Note: Sources or lists that share such an opinion include: Champions Basketball Network; Georgia Informer (2006); Bleacher Report (2011); ESPN panel (2016); Yardbarker (2019); Last Word On Sports (2019), (2020); Upside Hoops (2020); Pro Sports Outlook (2022); The Sportster (2022); The Sporting News (2023); Lineups (2023); USA Today Sports (2024); The Midfield (2024); ClutchPoints (2024); BasketNews (2024); Hoops Habit (2024); Legit News (2024); Modded (2025); GiveMeSport (2025); HoopsHype (2025); Fadeaway World (2025); Al Bat (2025))
Small forward	(United States) Larry Bird	(Note: Sources or lists that share such an opinion include: Basketball Lab; CBS News (2014); Boston's Big Four (2016); Bleacher Report (2018))
Small forward	(United States) LeBron James	(Note: Sources or lists that share such an opinion include: Champions Basketball Network; ESPN panel (2016); Yardbarker (2019); Lineups (2023); ClutchPoints (2024); GiveMeSport (2025); HoopsHype (2025); Fadeaway World (2025))
Power forward	(United States) Tim Duncan	(Note: Sources or lists that share such an opinion include: Champions Basketball Network; Bleacher Report (2010); ESPN panel (2016); Pro Sports Outlook (2022); Lineups (2023); HoopsHype (2024); BasketNews (2024); ClutchPoints (2024); GiveMeSport (2025); Fadeaway World (2025))
Center	(United States) Kareem Abdul-Jabbar	(Note: Sources or lists that share such an opinion include: Bleacher Report (2015); ESPN panel (2016); Pro Sports Outlook (2022); Franchise Sports (2022); The Grueling Truth (2023); Lineups (2023); NBC Sports Boston (2024); HoopsHype (2024); BasketNews (2024); ClutchPoints (2024); Hoops Habit (2024); Heavy Sports (2024); Talksport (2025); GiveMeSport (2025); Fadeaway World (2025))
Center	(United States) Wilt Chamberlain	(Note: Sources or lists that share such an opinion include: Dave Talks Sports (2014); Bleacher Report (2018); The Sportster (2022))
Center	(United States) Bill Russell	(Note: Sources or lists that share such an opinion include: Bleacher Report (2011); Complex (2014))

=== Other team sports ===
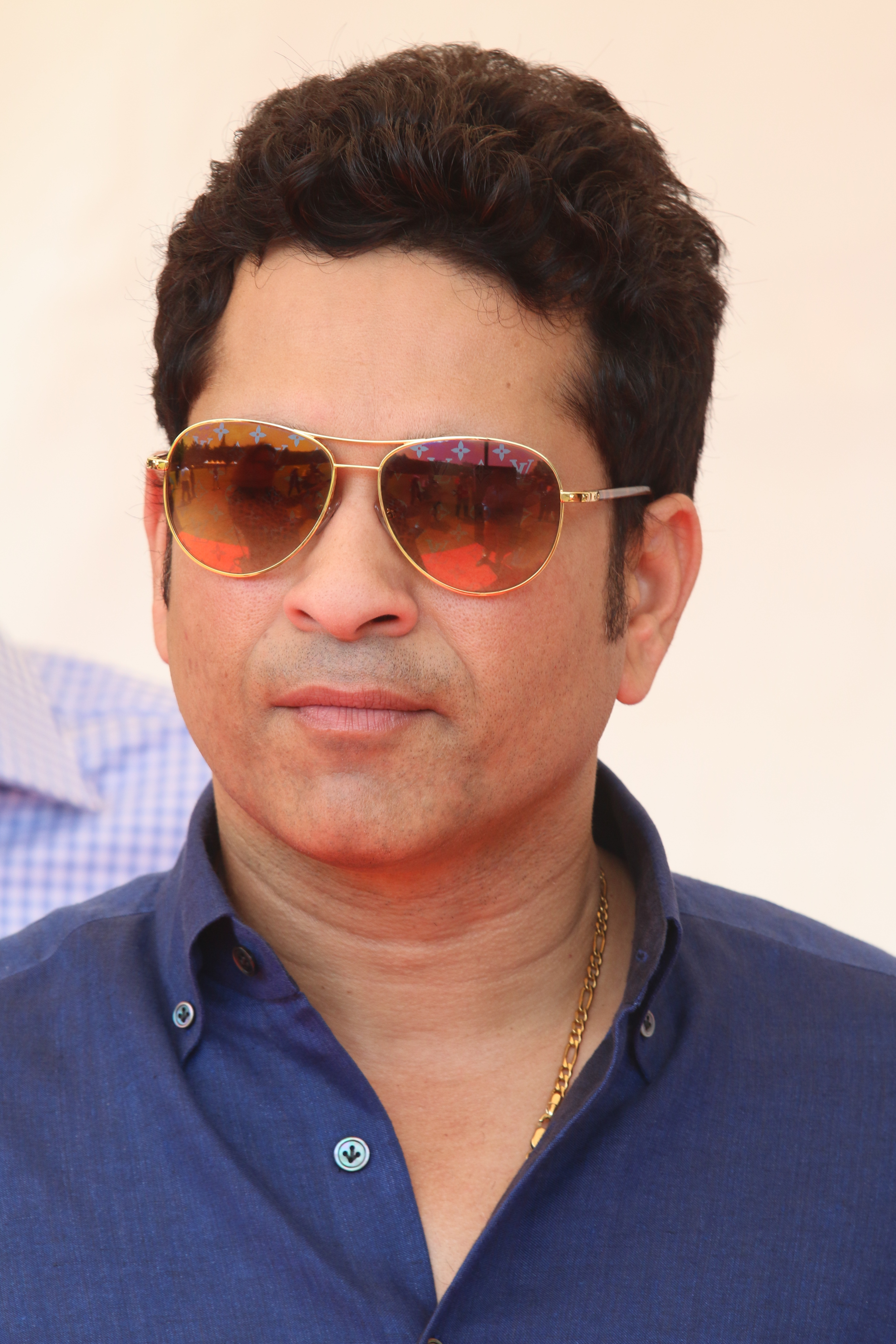
Sachin Tendulkar

List of athletes considered the greatest
Sport	Position	Player	Sources
Bobsleigh	Driver	(Italy) Eugenio Monti	(Note: Sources or lists that share such an opinion include: Sports Illustrated (1961); Yardbarker (2018); NBC Sports (2020); Infobae (2021); Baba-Mail (2022))
Cricket (men's, any form)	Batter	(Australia) Don Bradman	(Note: Sources or lists that share such an opinion include: ABC News (2013); Inspirepreneur Magazine (2024); The Telegraph (2025))
Cricket (men's, ODI)	Batter	(India) Virat Kohli	(Note: Sources or lists that share such an opinion include: Crictoday (2023); The Telegraph (2023); Forbes (2023); The Sports Legends (2024); ESPN (2025))
Cricket (men's, ODI)	Batter	(India) Sachin Tendulkar	(Note: Sources or lists that share such an opinion include: The Telegraph (2011); ESPN (2023); Cricinfo (2025); SportsBoom (2025))
Cricket (men's, Test cricket)	Bowler	(Sri Lanka) Muttiah Muralitharan	(Note: Sources or lists that share such an opinion include: BBC Sport (2002); Sportskeeda (2014); The Siasat Daily (2022))
Rugby union	Fly-half	(New Zealand) Dan Carter	(Note: Sources or lists that share such an opinion include: ESPN (2013); The Scotsman (2015); The Telegraph (2021))

== List of sports teams considered the greatest ==
List of teams considered the greatest
Sport	Team	Sources
American football	(United States) Miami Dolphins (1972)	(Note: Sources or lists that share such an opinion include: NFL Network 80-person panel put together by the Associated Press and NFL media (2019); Pro Football Network (2024); CBS Sports (2025); Modded (2025))
American football	(United States) Chicago Bears (1985)	(Note: Sources or lists that share such an opinion include: ESPN.com; Bleacher Report (2018); New Arena (2024); Lineups (2025))
Association football	Brazil national football team (1970)	(Note: Sources or lists that share such an opinion include: World Soccer magazine (2007); Bleacher Report (2013); USA Today Sports (2024); Sports Illustrated (2025); Creativoro (2025))
Baseball	(United States) New York Yankees (1927)	(Note: Sources or lists that share such an opinion include: The New York Times (1977); Bleacher Report (2014), (2018); Yanks Go Yard (2014); Yahoo Sports (2020))
Baseball	(United States) New York Yankees (1998)	(Note: Sources or lists that share such an opinion include: Lineups (2020); BallNine (2023); Fueled by Sports (2023); Baseball Prospectus (2023); New Arena (2024))
Basketball	United States men's national basketball team (1992)	(Note: Sources or lists that share such an opinion include: United States Olympic & Paralympic Museum; NBA.com (2017); Bleacher Report (2018))
Cricket	Australia national cricket team (1948)	(Note: Sources or lists that share such an opinion include: The Daily Star (2010); Inside the Games (2018); Stadium Talk (2024))
Rugby	(United Kingdom) (Republic of Ireland) British & Irish Lions (1971)	(Note: Sources or lists that share such an opinion include: William Hill (2024); WalesOnline (2024))
Rugby	New Zealand national rugby union team (2015)	(Note: Sources or lists that share such an opinion include: Inkl (2015); The New Zealand Herald (2015))

== List of sports personnel considered the greatest ==
=== Coach/manager/trainer ===
List of coaches considered the greatest
Sport	Coach	
All sports	(United States) John Wooden	(Note: Sources or lists that share such an opinion include: ESPN.com; The Sporting News (2009); MyNorthwest (2010); Go Joe Bruin (2012); Sports Illustrated (2017); Upson Beacon (2022); College Sports Network (2024))
American football	(United States) Bill Belichick	(Note: Sources or lists that share such an opinion include: Pro Football Network (2021); Morning Consult survey (2022); Audacy (2022); Pro Sports Outlook (2023); FuboTV (2023); CBS Sports (2024 panel); Yahoo! Sports (2024); ClutchPoints (2024); GiveMeSport (2024); Stadium Talk (2024); ESPN (2019), (2024); Athlon Sports (2025); Sportsnaut (2025))
American football	(United States) Vince Lombardi	(Note: Sources or lists that share such an opinion include: TIME (2008); ESPN (2013); NFL Spin Zone (2018); Morning Consult survey (2022); Draft Countdown (2024); Sports Tiger (2025))
American football	(United States) Don Shula	(Note: Sources or lists that share such an opinion include: Bleacher Report (2018); The Daytona Beach News-Journal (2020); The Athletic (2024))
American football (college)	(United States) Nick Saban	(Note: Sources or lists that share such an opinion include: The Washington Post (2016); CBS Sports (2018); Forbes (2018); The Sporting News poll (2019); Los Angeles Times (2021); ESPN (2024); Garden & Gun (2024); Bama Hammer (2025))
Association football	(United Kingdom) Sir Alex Ferguson	(Note: Sources or lists that share such an opinion include: World Soccer (2013); Paste Magazine (2017); 90min (2019); FourFourTwo (2023); Sports Illustrated (2025); GiveMeSport (2025))
Baseball	(United States) Joe McCarthy	(Note: Sources or lists that share such an opinion include: Total Apex Sports; Bleacher Report (2018); Athlon Sports (2022); Humm Baby Baseball (2023); Stadium Talk (2024))
Baseball	(United States) Casey Stengel	(Note: Sources or lists that share such an opinion include: AinsworthSports.com; Through The Fence Baseball (2013); Chicago Tribune (2019); New Arena (2024))
Basketball (men's)	(United States) Red Auerbach	(Note: Sources or lists that share such an opinion include: The Perspective; PBWA (1980); ESPN (2006); The Washington Post (2006); Bleacher Report (2018))
Basketball (men's)	(United States) Phil Jackson	(Note: Sources or lists that share such an opinion include: The Perspective; Champions Basketball Network; ESPN (2009); Bleacher Report (2018), (2025); Athlon Sports (2020); Fadeaway World (2022); Fox Sports analyst Shannon Sharpe (2022); Franchise Sports (2022); Pro Sports Outlook (2022); CBS Sports (2025); FanBuzz (2025))
Basketball (men's)	(United States) Gregg Popovich	(Note: Sources or lists that share such an opinion include: The Baylor Lariat (2022); CBS Sports (2025); The Sporting News (2025))
Basketball (women's)	(United States) Geno Auriemma	(Note: Sources or lists that share such an opinion include: Bleacher Report (2018); The Collegiate (2024); Hartford Courant (2025))
Boxing	(United States) Cus D'Amato	(Note: Sources or lists that share such an opinion include: Bleacher Report (2018); SF Active (2024))
Horse racing (trainer, flat racing)	(United States) Bob Baffert	(Note: Sources or lists that share such an opinion include: The TwinSpires Edge (2015); Yahoo Sports (2018); SF Active (2024))
Ice hockey	(Canada) Scotty Bowman	(Note: Sources or lists that share such an opinion include: Sports Team History; AinsworthSports.com; Puck Prose (2020); Franchise Sports (2022); Hockey Topics (2023); SF Active (2024); Lines (2024); NHL Sports Hub (2025))
MMA	(United States) Greg Jackson	(Note: Sources or lists that share such an opinion include: Skillset Magazine; Popular Science (2012); Bleacher Report (2016), (2018); SF Active (2024); FIGHT.TV (2024))

== List of sports media figures considered the greatest ==
=== Commentators ===
List of commentators considered the greatest
Type/Field	Individual	
Announcer/broadcaster, general	(United States) Howard Cosell	(Note: Sources or lists that share such an opinion include: TV Guide (1993); Yahoo! Sports (2009); Stadium Talk (2024))
Announcer/broadcaster, general	(United States) Bob Costas	(Note: Sources or lists that share such an opinion include: Tampa Bay Times (2013); Syracuse.com (2016); KSDK (2021); Sports Broadcast Journal (2024))
Announcer/broadcaster, general	(United States) Vin Scully	(Note: Sources or lists that share such an opinion include: American Sportscasters Association; Reno Gazette-Journal sports columnist Chris Murray's list of top 10 sports announcers of all time (2015); LAist (2022); Sports Broadcast Journal (2022); Fort Worth Star-Telegram (2022))
Announcer/broadcaster, general	(United Kingdom) Murray Walker	(Note: Sources or lists that share such an opinion include: Autoevolution (2009); Crash.net (2022))
Announcer/broadcaster, general	(Brazil) Carlos Eduardo dos Santos Galvao Bueno	(Note: Sources or lists that share such an opinion include: Folha de S.Paulo (2023))

== See also ==
- 100 Greatest of All Time
- 100 Greatest NHL Players
- Australian rugby league's 100 greatest players
- Big Three (tennis)
- Comparison of top chess players throughout history
- FIFA 100
- Messi–Ronaldo rivalry
- Mythical national championship
- NASCAR's 75 Greatest Drivers
- The Top 100: NFL's Greatest Players
- TSN Top 50 CFL Players
