= List of career achievements by Stephen Curry =

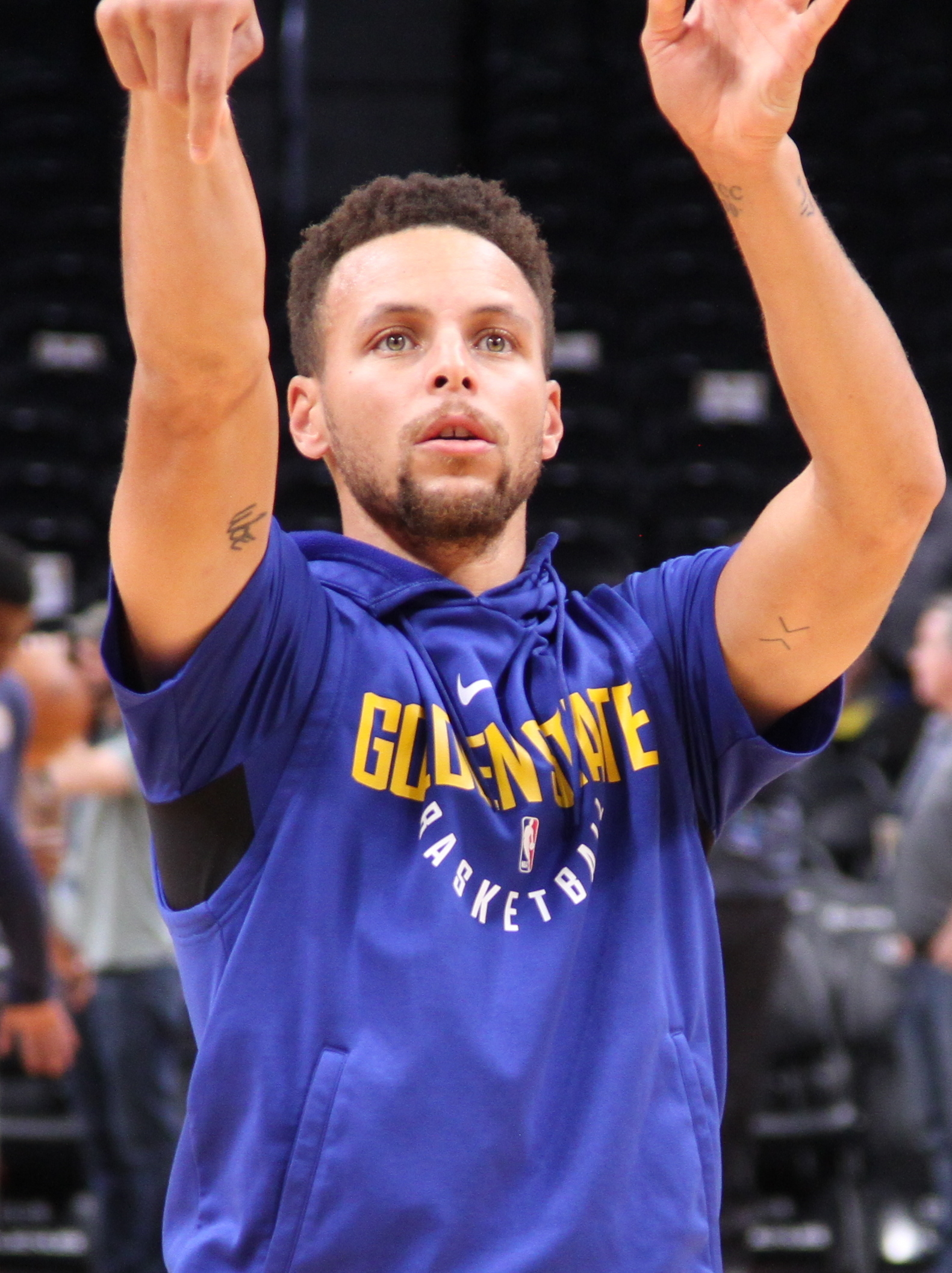
Stephen Curry

This page details the records, statistics, and career achievements of American professional basketball player Stephen Curry.

Curry is a point guard for the Golden State Warriors of the National Basketball Association (NBA). He was selected as the 7th overall pick in the 2009 NBA draft and had previously played collegiately for Davidson. As the holder of numerous records, particularly in three-point shooting, he is widely considered the greatest shooter and one of the greatest players of all time.

Curry has played for the Warriors in each of his 17 career seasons in the NBA, where he is a four-time NBA champion, a two-time NBA Most Valuable Player (MVP), an NBA Finals MVP, a two-time NBA All-Star Game MVP, an NBA Clutch Player of the Year, and the inaugural NBA Western Conference finals MVP. He is also a two-time NBA scoring champion, a twelve-time NBA All-Star, and an eleven-time All-NBA Team selection (including four on the First Team). Internationally, he has won two gold medals at the FIBA World Cup and a gold medal at the 2024 Summer Olympics as part of the U.S. national team.

== Career statistics ==
Legend
GP	Games played	GS	Games started	MPG	Minutes per game
FG%	Field goal percentage	3P%	3-point field goal percentage	FT%	Free throw percentage
RPG	Rebounds per game	APG	Assists per game	SPG	Steals per game
BPG	Blocks per game	PPG	Points per game	**Bold**	Career high
†	Won an NBA championship	*	Led the league	‡	NBA record

=== Regular season ===
Year	Team	GP	GS	MPG	FG%	3P%	FT%	RPG	APG	SPG	BPG	PPG
2009–10	Golden State	**80**	77	36.2	.462	.437	.885	4.5	5.9	1.9	.2	17.5
2010–11	Golden State	74	74	33.6	.480	.442	.934*	3.9	5.8	1.5	.3	18.6
2011–12	Golden State	26	23	28.2	.490	**.455**	.809	3.4	5.3	1.5	.3	14.7
2012–13	Golden State	78	78	**38.2**	.451	.453	.900	4.0	6.9	1.6	.2	22.9
2013–14	Golden State	78	78	36.5	.471	.424	.885	4.3	**8.5**	1.6	.2	24.0
2014–15^{†}	Golden State	**80**	**80**	32.7	.487	.443	.914*	4.3	7.7	2.0	.2	23.8
2015–16	Golden State	79	79	34.2	**.504**	.454	.908*	5.4	6.7	**2.1***	.2	30.1*
2016–17^{†}	Golden State	79	79	33.4	.468	.411	.898	4.5	6.6	1.8	.2	25.3
2017–18^{†}	Golden State	51	51	32.0	.495	.423	.921*	5.1	6.1	1.6	.2	26.4
2018–19	Golden State	69	69	33.8	.472	.437	.916	5.3	5.2	1.3	**.4**	27.3
2019–20	Golden State	5	5	27.8	.402	.245	**1.000** (Note: Due to an injury-plagued season, Curry attempted (and made) 26 free throws, thus achieving a career-high 100% free throw percentage in a season. However, it does not stand as a season-high statistic as a free throw percentage leader must record at least 125 made free throws in a season.)	5.2	6.6	1.0	**.4**	20.8
2020–21	Golden State	63	63	34.2	.482	.421	.916	5.5	5.8	1.2	.1	**32.0***
2021–22^{†}	Golden State	64	64	34.5	.437	.380	.923	5.2	6.3	1.3	**.4**	25.5
2022–23	Golden State	56	56	34.7	.493	.427	.915	**6.1**	6.3	.9	**.4**	29.4
2023–24	Golden State	74	74	32.7	.450	.408	.923	4.5	5.1	.7	**.4**	26.4
2024–25	Golden State	70	70	32.2	.448	.397	.933*	4.4	6.0	1.1	**.4**	24.5
Career		1,026	1,020	34.1	.471	.423	.911^{‡}	4.7	6.4	1.5	.3	24.7
All-Star		8	8	27.0	.433	.405	1.000	5.6	5.8	1.4	.3	22.5

=== Playoffs ===
Year	Team	GP	GS	MPG	FG%	3P%	FT%	RPG	APG	SPG	BPG	PPG
2013	Golden State	12	12	41.4	.434	.396	.921	3.8	8.1	1.7	.2	23.4
2014	Golden State	7	7	**42.3**	.999	.386	.881	3.6	**8.4**	1.7	.1	23.0
2015^{†}	Golden State	21	21	39.3	.456	**.422**	.835	5.0	6.4	1.9	.1	28.3
2016	Golden State	18	17	34.3	.438	.404	.916	5.5	5.2	1.4	.3	25.1
2017^{†}	Golden State	17	17	35.3	**.484**	.419	.904	**6.2**	6.7	**2.0**	.2	28.1
2018^{†}	Golden State	15	14	37.0	.451	.395	**.957**	6.1	5.4	1.7	.7	25.5
2019	Golden State	**22**	**22**	38.5	.441	.377	.943	6.0	5.7	1.1	.2	28.2
2022^{†}	Golden State	**22**	18	34.7	.459	.397	.829	5.2	5.9	1.3	.4	27.4
2023	Golden State	13	13	37.9	.466	.363	.845	5.2	6.1	1.0	.5	**30.5**
2025	Golden State	8	8	35.1	.477	.400	.893	5.3	5.1	1.0	**.8**	22.6
Career		155	149	37.2	.454	.397	.889	5.3	6.1	1.5	.3	26.8

== Awards and honors ==
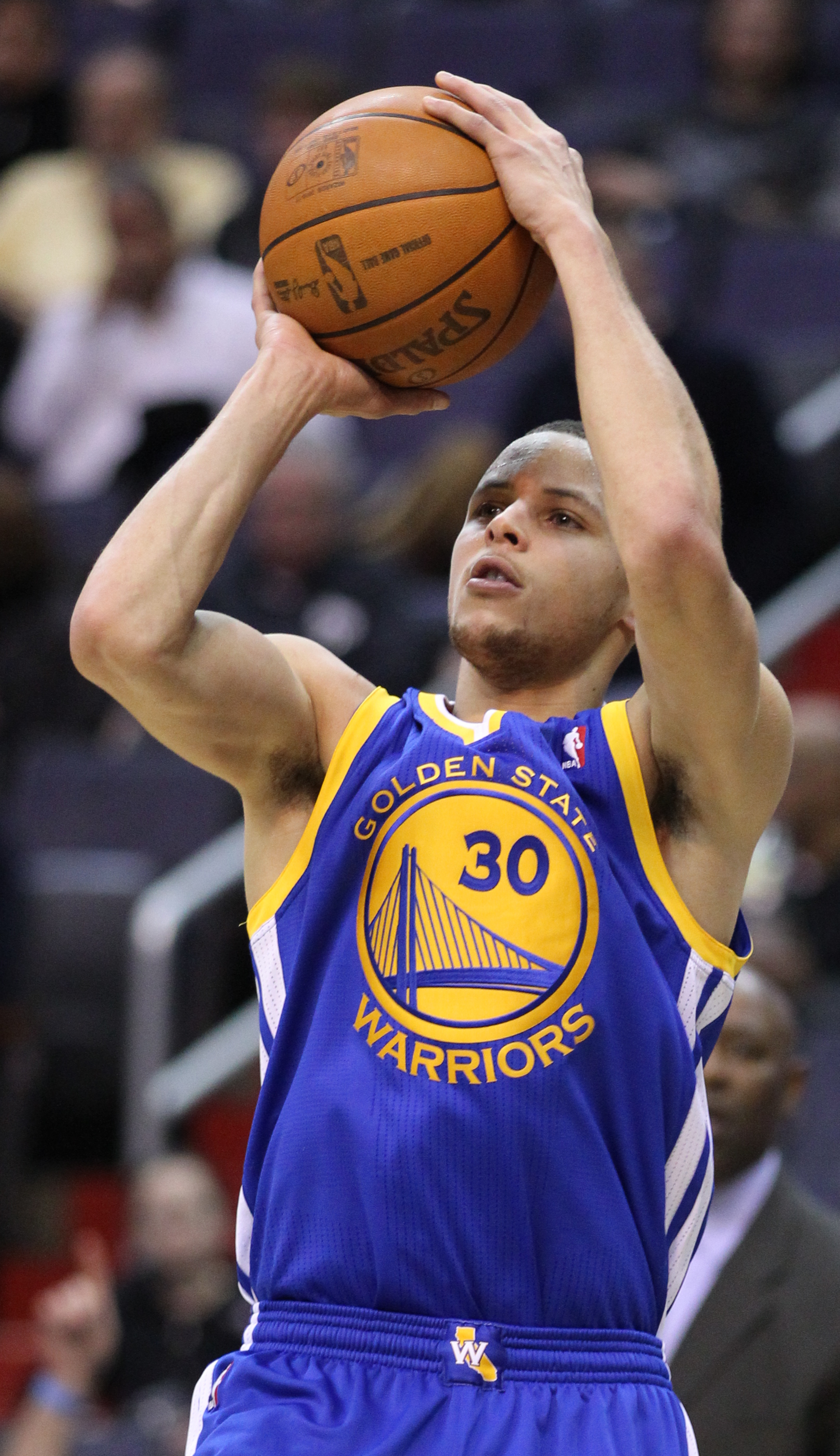
With one of the quickest releases in the NBA and the ability to make jump shots from virtually anywhere on the court, Curry is often considered the greatest shooter of all time.

NBA

- 4× NBA champion: 2015, 2017, 2018, 2022
- NBA Finals MVP: 2022
- 2× NBA Most Valuable Player: 2015, 2016
  - The only unanimous MVP selection in league history (2016)
- 12× NBA All-Star: 2014, 2015, 2016, 2017, 2018, 2019, 2021, 2022, 2023, 2024, 2025, 2026
- 2× NBA All-Star Game MVP: 2022, 2025
- 11× All-NBA Team selection:
  - 4× First team: 2015, 2016, 2019, 2021
  - 5× Second team: 2014, 2017, 2022, 2023, 2025
  - 2× Third team: 2018, 2024
- NBA All-Rookie First Team: 2010
- NBA Western Conference finals MVP: 2022
- NBA Clutch Player of the Year: 2024
- NBA Teammate of the Year: 2025
- NBA Sportsmanship Award: 2011
- 2× NBA Three-Point Contest champion: 2015, 2021
- NBA vs. WNBA Three-Point Challenge champion: 2024
- NBA Skills Challenge champion: 2011
- 2× NBA scoring champion: 2016, 2021
- NBA steals leader: 2016
- 8× NBA three-point scoring leader: 2013, 2014, 2015, 2016, 2017, 2021, 2022, 2024
- 5× NBA free-throw percentage leader: 2011, 2015, 2016, 2018, 2025
- 50–40–90 club: 2016
  - The only player in league history to achieve this feat while averaging over 30 PPG
- Kareem Abdul-Jabbar Social Justice Champion: 2023
- J. Walter Kennedy Citizenship Award: 2023
- NBA Community Assist Award (2013–14) (January, Season-long)
- 2× Magic Johnson Award: 2016, 2024
- NBA 75th Anniversary Team: 2021
- 3× NBA Rookie of the Month
- 10× NBA Player of the Month
- 20× NBA Player of the Week

USA Basketball

- Olympic gold medalist: 2024
- Olympics All-Star Five: 2024
- FIBA World Cup gold medalist: 2010, 2014
- FIBA U-19 World Cup silver medalist: 2007
- USA Basketball Male Athlete of the Year: 2024

NCAA

- NCAA scoring champion: 2009
- 2× SoCon Player of the Year: 2008, 2009
- 2× SoCon Male Athlete of the Year: 2008, 2009
- Consensus first-team All-American: 2009
- Consensus second-team All-American: 2008
- 3× First-team All-SoCon: 2007, 2008, 2009
- SoCon Freshman of the Year: 2007
- SoCon All-Freshmen Team: 2007
- No. 30 retired by Davidson Wildcats

Halls of Fame

- Southern Conference Hall of Fame: Class of 2016
- Davidson Athletics Hall of Fame: Class of 2022

Golf

- American Century Championship: 2023
- Ambassador of Golf Award: 2023
- Charlie Sifford Award: 2024

Media

- AP Male Athlete of the Year: 2015
- 2× Sports Illustrated Sportsperson of the Year: 2018, (Note: As part of the Golden State Warriors.) 2022
- 5× BET Award for Sportsman of the Year: 2015, 2016, 2017, 2019, 2022
- Jackie Robinson Sports Award: 2021
- Hickok Belt: 2015
- 2× Magic Johnson Award: 2016, 2024
- 2× NBPA Players Awards winner:
  - Clutch Performer: 2015
  - Hardest to Guard: 2015
- 8× ESPY Award winner:
  - Best Male Athlete: 2015
  - 3× Best NBA Player: 2015, 2021, 2022
  - 2× Best Record-Breaking Performance: 2016, 2022
  - 2× Best Team: 2017, 2022
- 3× Teen Choice Award for Choice Male Athlete: 2015, 2016, 2017
- 10× Nickelodeon Kids' Choice Sports Awards winner:
  - 3× Best Male Athlete: 2015, 2017, 2019
  - 3× Clutch Player of the Year: 2015, 2016, 2019
  - 2× Sickest Moves: 2015, 2016
  - Favorite Basketball Player: 2019
  - Nothing But Net: 2019
- Shorty Award for Best in Sports: 2015
- Time 100 Most Influential People: 2016
- Time 100 Most Influential People in Philanthropy: 2025
- Sports Illustrated NBA All-Decade First Team: 2010s
- Sports Illustrated 50 Most Influential Figures in Sports: 2023
- Sporting News College Athlete of the Year: 2008
- Sporting News College All-Decade Second Team: 2000s
- 8× Forbes list of the world's top-10 highest-paid athletes: 2017, 2018, 2019, 2020, 2022, 2023, 2024, 2025
- Academy Award for Best Documentary Short Film (Note: As executive producer of The Queen of Basketball.): 2022
- Jefferson Award for Public Service: 2011

State/Local

- Section of Davidson College's John M. Belk Arena renamed "Section 30": 2017
- No. 20 retired by Charlotte Christian School: 2017
- Nine-story commemorative mural along Oakland YMCA at 2350 Broadway, Uptown Oakland: 2022
- I-77 Exit 30 renamed "The Stephen Curry Interchange": 2023
- Key to the City of San Francisco: 2013
- Key to the City of Charlotte: 2022

== NBA records ==
=== Golden State Warriors ===
Career leader
Category	Statistics	Ref.
SP	17	
GP	1,000+	
MP	36,000+	
PTS	26,500+	
AST	6,500+	
STL	1,500+	
FGM	9,000+	
FGA	19,000+	
TO	3,000+	
3PM	4,000+	
3PA	10,000+	
FT%	.90+	

Career playoffs leader
Category	Statistics	Ref.
PTS	4,000+	
FGM	1,300+	
FGA	3,000+	
TO	500+	
3PM	600+	
3PA	1,600+	
FTM	700+	
FTA	800+	

- Most All-Star selections in Warriors franchise history (12)
- Most All-NBA Team selections in Warriors franchise history (11)
- Led the Warriors to achieve the highest regular season winning record in NBA history (73–9 in 2015–16)

=== Regular season ===
Career

- Most three-pointers made in NBA history with 4,270.
- Most three-pointers attempted in NBA history with 10,123.
- Highest career free throw percentage (minimum 1,200 attempts) with .913.
- Most games with at least 5 three-pointers made with 403.
- Most games with at least 7 three-pointers made with 154.
- Most games with at least 8 three-pointers made with 93.
- Most games with at least 9 three-pointers made with 49.
- Most games with at least 10 three-pointers made with 28.
- Most games with at least 11 three-pointers made with 16.
- Most games with at least 12 three-pointers made with 5.
- Most consecutive games with at least 1 three-pointer made with 268.
- Most consecutive games (regular and post-season) with at least 1 three-pointer made with 233.
- Most 50-point games on 75+ true shooting percentage with 13.
- Most 50-point games with fewer than 10 free-throw attempts with 8.
- Most quarters with at least 20 points scored with 44. (Note: The most by any player since the NBA began tracking play-by-play data in 1997-98.)
- Fewest games played to reach 1,000 career three-pointers made with 369.
- Fewest games played to reach 2,000 career three-pointers made with 597.
- Fewest games played to reach 3,000 career three-pointers made with 794.

Season

- Most three-pointers made in a season with 402 (2015–16).
- Most three-pointers made in the clutch in a season with 32 (2023–24).
- Most three-pointers made in a month with 96 (April 2021).
- Most three-pointers made in a week with 36 (April 12, 2021).
- Most games with at least 10 three-pointers made in a season with 7 (2020–21).
- Most seasons leading the league in three-pointers made with 8.
- Most consecutive seasons leading the league in three-pointers made with 5.
- Most seasons with at least 250 three-pointers made with 11.
- Most seasons with at least 300 three-pointers made with 6.
- Most seasons with at least 350 three-pointers made with 3.
- Fewest games played to reach 100 three-pointers made in a season with 19 (2021–22).
- Highest three-point percentage in a season while averaging 30+ points per game with .454 (2015–16).
- Highest effective field goal percentage in a season while averaging 30+ points per game with .630 (2015–16).
- Highest offensive plus/minus in a season with 10.35 (2015–16).
- Highest three-point scoring average in a season with 5.3 (2020–21).
- Largest increase in scoring average from previous season by a reigning MVP with 6.3 (2015–16).

=== Playoffs ===
Career

- Most three-pointers made in NBA playoffs history with 650.
- Most three-pointers attempted in NBA playoffs history with 1,637.
- Most points scored during an overtime period in a playoff game with 17.
- Most points scored in a four-game sweep with 146 (vs. Portland Trail Blazers, 2019).
- Most playoff games with at least 6 three-pointers made with 41.

Season

- Most three-pointers made in a playoff season with 98 (2015).
  - Tied with Klay Thompson.

=== Finals ===
Career

- Most three-pointers made in NBA Finals history with 152.
- Most three-pointers attempted in NBA Finals history with 365.
- Most three-pointers made in an NBA Finals game with 9.
- Most three-pointers attempted in an NBA Finals game with 17.
- Most three-pointers made in an NBA Finals quarter with 6. (Note: The most by any player since the NBA began tracking play-by-play data in 1997-98.)

Series

- Most three-pointers made in an NBA Finals series with 32 (vs. Cleveland Cavaliers, 2016).
- Most three-pointers made in an NBA Finals six-game series with 31 (vs. Boston Celtics, 2022).

=== All-Star Game ===
- Most three-pointers made in NBA All-Star Game history with 57.
- Most three-pointers made in an All-Star Game with 16 (2022).
- Most three-pointers attempted in an All-Star Game with 27 (2022).

=== Age-related ===
- Most 50-point games after turning 30 years old with 10.
- Most 50-point games after turning 35 years old with 4.
- Most 40-point games after turning 30 years old with 45.
- Most 35-point games after turning 30 years old with 97.
- Oldest player in NBA history to record a 50-point game with at least 10 assists: 33 years, 239 days.

== USA basketball records ==
- Most three-pointers made in an Olympic elimination game with 9.
- Most three-pointers made in an Olympic final with 8.
- Most points scored in an Olympic elimination game by an American with 36.

== NCAA records ==
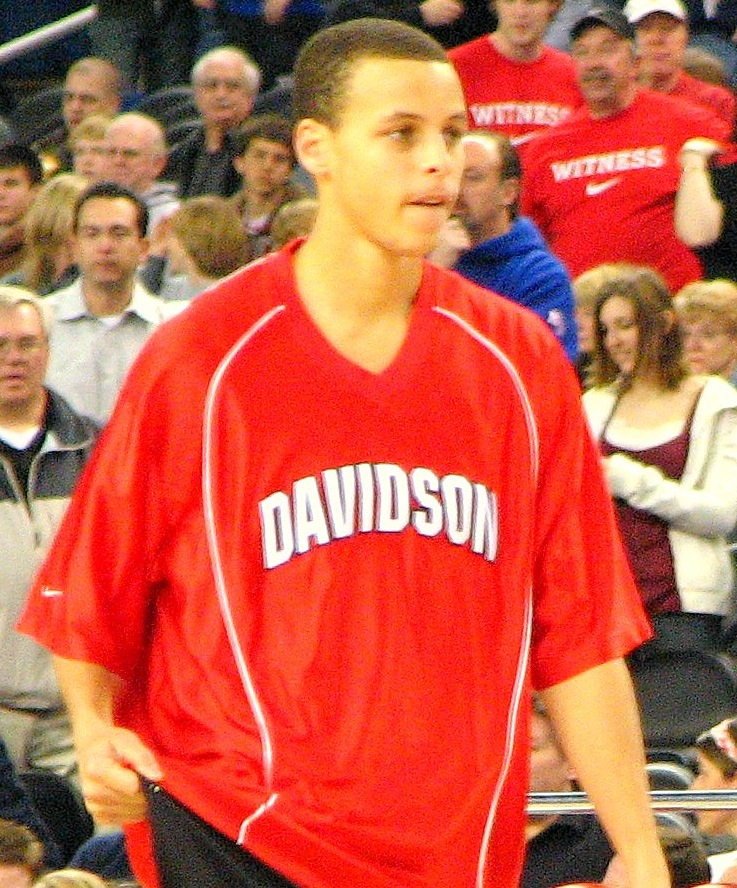
Curry with Davidson at the 2008 NCAA Tournament

- Most three-pointers made in an NCAA season with 162 (2007–08)
  - Tied with Darius McGhee.
- Highest three-point scoring average in an NCAA sophomore season with 4.5 (2007–08)

=== Davidson College ===
Career leader
Category	Statistics	Ref.
PTS	2,635	
3PM	414	
3P%	.412	
SPG	2.1	
30PTG	30	
40PTG	6	

Season leader
Category	Statistics	Season	Ref.
PTS	974	2008–09	
PPG	28.6	2008–09	
FTM	220	2008–09	
STL	86	2008–09	
FGM	317	2007–08	
PTS (Fr.)	730	2006–07	
3PM (Fr.)	122	2006–07	
