= List of career achievements by Cristiano Ronaldo =

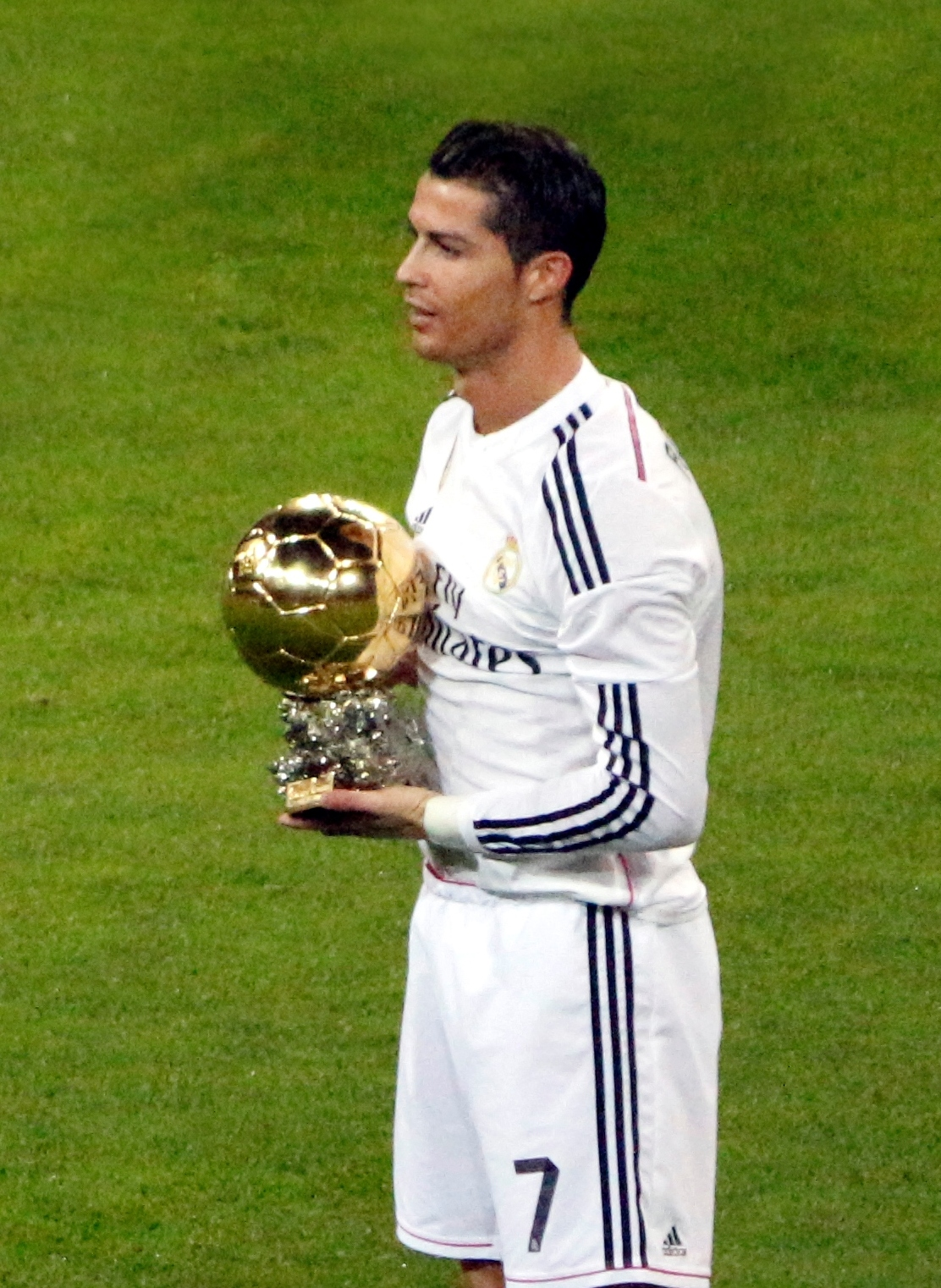
Ronaldo presenting his second FIFA Ballon d'Or to fans at the Santiago Bernabéu before a match against Atlético Madrid in January 2015

Over the course of his career, Portuguese footballer Cristiano Ronaldo has received five Ballon d'Or/FIFA Ballon d'Or awards, (Note: The terminology for the award has varied. Ronaldo received three Ballons d'Or (2008, 2016, 2017) and two FIFA Ballons d'Or (2013, 2014), as well as the 2008 FIFA World Player of the Year and 2016, 2017 The Best FIFA Men's Player awards.) the most for a European player. Widely regarded as one of the greatest players of all time, Ronaldo holds the record for most goals in the UEFA Champions League (140 goals), and the record for most goals in the UEFA European Championship (14), its qualification stage (40), and the FIFA Club World Cup (7), as well as most goals scored in a UEFA Champions League season (17 in 2013–14), most international goals (146), and most appearances in a national team (234). He has scored a record 986 senior career goals for club and country. Moreover, he is one of only three players to have made over 1,300 professional career appearances. Collectively, Ronaldo has won 35 senior trophies in his career.

== Collective awards ==
Season / year	Competition	Club / national team	Ref.
2002	Supertaça Cândido de Oliveira	Sporting CP	
2003–04	FA Cup	Manchester United	
2004	UEFA European Championship runner-up	Portugal	
2004–05	FA Cup runner-up (Note: Runners-up received medals in the FA Cup.)	Manchester United	
2005–06	Football League Cup	Manchester United	
2006	FIFA World Cup fourth place (Note: Ronaldo was a squad member, as Portugal finished fourth.)	Portugal	
2006–07	Premier League	Manchester United	
2006–07	FA Cup runner-up	Manchester United	
2007	FA Community Shield	Manchester United	
2007–08	Premier League	Manchester United	
2007–08	UEFA Champions League	Manchester United	
2008	FIFA Club World Cup	Manchester United	
2008–09	Premier League	Manchester United	
2008–09	Football League Cup	Manchester United	
2008–09	UEFA Champions League runner-up (Note: Runners-up receive medals in the UEFA Champions League.)	Manchester United	
2010–11	Copa del Rey	Real Madrid	
2011	Supercopa de España runner-up (Note: Ronaldo declined the medal.)	Real Madrid	
2011–12	La Liga	Real Madrid	
2012	UEFA European Championship bronze medal	Portugal	
2012	Supercopa de España	Real Madrid	
2012–13	Copa del Rey runner-up	Real Madrid	
2013–14	Copa del Rey (Note: Although Ronaldo did not play in the 2014 Copa del Rey Final, he played six times in Real Madrid's run to the final, scoring three goals.)	Real Madrid	
2013–14	UEFA Champions League	Real Madrid	
2014	UEFA Super Cup	Real Madrid	
2014	Supercopa de España runner-up	Real Madrid	
2014	FIFA Club World Cup	Real Madrid	
2015–16	UEFA Champions League	Real Madrid	
2016	UEFA European Championship	Portugal	
2016	FIFA Club World Cup	Real Madrid	
2016–17	La Liga	Real Madrid	
2016–17	UEFA Champions League	Real Madrid	
2017	FIFA Confederations Cup third place (Note: Ronaldo was a squad member, as Portugal finished third.)	Portugal	
2017	UEFA Super Cup	Real Madrid	
2017	Supercopa de España	Real Madrid	
2017	FIFA Club World Cup	Real Madrid	
2017–18	UEFA Champions League	Real Madrid	
2018	Supercoppa Italiana	Juventus	
2018–19	Serie A	Juventus	
2018–19	UEFA Nations League	Portugal	
2019	Supercoppa Italiana runner-up (Note: Runners-up receive medals in the Supercoppa Italiana.)	Juventus	
2019–20	Coppa Italia runner-up (Note: Runners-up receive medals in the Coppa Italia.)	Juventus	
2019–20	Serie A	Juventus	
2020	Supercoppa Italiana	Juventus	
2020–21	Coppa Italia	Juventus	
2023	Arab Club Champions Cup	Al-Nassr	
2024	King Cup runner-up (Note: Runners-up receive medals in the King Cup.)	Al-Nassr	
2024	Saudi Super Cup runner-up (Note: Ronaldo declined the medal.)	Al-Nassr	
2024–25	UEFA Nations League	Portugal	
2025	Saudi Super Cup runner-up	Al-Nassr	
2025–26	AFC Champions League Two runner-up	Al-Nassr	
2025–26	Saudi Pro League	Al-Nassr	

=== Friendly competitions ===
Year	Competition	Club / national team	Ref.
2003	Toulon Tournament	Portugal U20	
2009	Trofeo Santiago Bernabéu	Real Madrid	
2010	Franz Beckenbauer Cup	Real Madrid	
2010	Trofeo Santiago Bernabéu	Real Madrid	
2010	Taçi Oil Cup	Real Madrid	
2011	World Football Challenge	Real Madrid	
2011	Npower Challenge Cup	Real Madrid	
2011	Trofeo Santiago Bernabéu	Real Madrid	
2012	World Football Challenge	Real Madrid	
2013	International Champions Cup	Real Madrid	
2013	Teresa Herrera Trophy	Real Madrid	
2013	Trofeo Santiago Bernabéu	Real Madrid	
2015	International Champions Cup: 2015 China	Real Madrid	
2015	International Champions Cup: 2015 Australia	Real Madrid	
2015	Trofeo Santiago Bernabéu	Real Madrid	
2016	Trofeo Santiago Bernabéu	Real Madrid	
2017	Trofeo Santiago Bernabéu	Real Madrid	

== Individual honours ==
Ronaldo has obtained many other minor achievements, awards and recognitions, by the major sport magazines and newspapers, which are not reported.

=== Selections for the best player or forward ===
Organisations (Note: Awards, galas, honours, prize awarders and other miscellaneous organisations are presented in a randomised order.)	Category	Edition / year	Result	Ref.
World
Ballon d'Or Gala	Ballon d'Or	2008, 2016, and 2017	Won	
Ballon d'Or Gala	Ballon d'Or	2007, 2009, and 2018	Runner-up	
Ballon d'Or Gala	Ballon d'Or	2019	Third place	
Ballon d'Or Gala	Ballon d'Or	2021	Sixth place	
Ballon d'Or Gala	Ballon d'Or	2004	12th place	
Ballon d'Or Gala	Ballon d'Or	2006	14th place	
Ballon d'Or Gala	Ballon d'Or	2005 and 2022	20th place	
FIFA Ballon d'Or Gala	FIFA Ballon d'Or	2013 and 2014	Won	
FIFA Ballon d'Or Gala	FIFA Ballon d'Or	2011, 2012, and 2015	Runner-up	
FIFA Ballon d'Or Gala	FIFA Ballon d'Or	2010	Sixth place	
FIFA	World Player of the Year	2008	Won	
FIFA	World Player of the Year	2009	Runner-up	
FIFA	World Player of the Year	2007	Third place	
FIFA	World Player of the Year	2006	Tenth place	
FIFA	World Player of the Year	2004	13th place	
FIFA	World Player of the Year	2005	20th place	
The Best FIFA Football Awards	The Best FIFA Men's Player	2016 and 2017	Won	
The Best FIFA Football Awards	The Best FIFA Men's Player	2018 and 2020	Runner-up	
The Best FIFA Football Awards	The Best FIFA Men's Player	2019	Third place	
The Best FIFA Football Awards	The Best FIFA Men's Player	2021	Seventh place	
FIFA Club World Cup awards	Golden Ball	2016	Gold	
FIFA Club World Cup awards	Golden Ball	2008, 2014, and 2017	Silver	
International Federation of Professional Footballers	World Player of the Year	2008	Won	
International Federation of Professional Footballers	Special Young Player of the Year	2003–04 and 2004–05	Won	
World Soccer	World Player of the Year	2008, 2013, 2014, 2016, and 2017	Won	
Globe Soccer Awards	Best Player of the Year	2011, 2014, 2016, 2017, 2018, and 2019	Won	
Globe Soccer Awards	Best Player of the Year	2020	Shortlisted	
Globe Soccer Awards	Best Player of the Year	2021	Shortlisted	
Globe Soccer Awards	Best Player of the Year	2023	Shortlisted	
Globe Soccer Awards	Best Player of the Year	2024	Shortlisted	
Globe Soccer Awards	Player of the Century (2001–20)	2020	Won	
International Federation of Football History & Statistics	World's Best Playmaker	2008	Runner-up	
International Federation of Football History & Statistics	World's Best Man Player of the Decade (2011–20)	2020	Runner-up	
International Federation of Football History & Statistics	World's Best Man Player of All Time	2025	Fourth place	
Onze Mondial	Onze Mondial Award	2008 and 2016–17	Gold	
Onze Mondial	Onze Mondial Award	2007, 2009, and 2011–12	Silver	
Onze Mondial	Onze Mondial Award	2010–11 and 2017–18	Bronze	
Guerin Sportivo	Bravo Award	2004	Won	
ESPY Awards	Best International Men's Soccer Player	2018 and 2021	Won	
Goal	Goal 50	2008, 2012, 2014, 2016, and 2017	Won	
Goal	Goal 50	2011, 2015, and 2018	Runner-up	
Goal	Goal 50	2013	Third place	
Goal	Goal 50	2009 and 2019	Fourth place	
Goal	Goal 50	2020	Fifth place	
Goal	Goal 50	2010	Ninth place	
Golden Foot		2020	Won	
Golden Foot		2013, 2014, 2015, 2016, 2017, 2018, and 2019	Nominated	
The Guardian	Best Male Footballer in the World	2014 and 2016	Won	
The Guardian	Best Male Footballer in the World	2012, 2013, 2015, 2017, and 2018	Runner-up	
The Guardian	Best Male Footballer in the World	2020	Third place	
The Guardian	Best Male Footballer in the World	2019	Fourth place	
The Guardian	Best Male Footballer in the World	2021	Eighth place	
FourFourTwo	Best Player of the Year	2008, 2013, 2014 and 2016	Won	
Dongqiudi	Player of the Year	2016 and 2017	Won	
Europe
Union of European Football Associations	Men's Player of the Year Award	2013–14, 2015–16, and 2016–17	Won	
Union of European Football Associations	Men's Player of the Year Award	2011–12 and 2017–18	Runner-up	
Union of European Football Associations	Men's Player of the Year Award	2010–11, 2012–13, 2014–15, and 2018–19	Third place	
Union of European Football Associations	Men's Player of the Year Award	2020–21	Ninth place	
Union of European Football Associations	Men's Player of the Year Award	2019–20	Tenth place	
Union of European Football Associations	Champions League Forward of the Season	2016–17 and 2017–18	Won	
Union of European Football Associations	Champions League Forward of the Season	2018–19	Third place	
Union of European Football Associations	Champions League Forward of the Season	2019–20	Eighth place	
Union of European Football Associations	Champions League Player of the Week	MD1/2015–16, MD2/2015–16, MD6/2015–16, R16/2015–16 (1st leg), QF/2015–16 (1st leg), SF/2015–16 (2nd leg), QF/2016–17 (1st leg), SF/2016–17 (1st leg), F, MD2/2017–18, MD5/2017–18, MD6/2017–18, R16/2017–18 (2nd leg), R16/2018–19 (2nd leg), R16/2019–20 (2nd leg)	Won	
Union of European Football Associations	Champions League Player of the Week	37/2017 and 14/2018	Nominated	
UEFA Club Football Awards	Club Footballer of the Year	2008	Won	
UEFA Club Football Awards	Club Forward of the Year	2007–08	Won	
International Federation of Football History & Statistics	UEFA Best Man Player of the Decade (2011–20)	2020	Won	
Portugal
Quina de Oro Awards	Best Portuguese Player of All Time	2015	Won	
England
PFA Awards	PFA Young Player of the Year	2006–07	Won	
PFA Awards	PFA Young Player of the Year	2007–08	Shortlisted	
PFA Awards	PFA Players' Player of the Year	2006–07 and 2007–08	Won	
PFA Awards	PFA Fans' Player of the Year	2006–07 and 2007–08	Won	
Football Writers' Association	Footballer of the Year	2006–07 and 2007–08	Won	
Premier League Player of the Season		2006–07 and 2007–08	Won	
Premier League Player of the Month		Nov 2006, Dec 2006, Jan 2008, Mar 2008, Sep 2021 and Apr 2022	Won	
Premier League 20 Seasons Awards	Best Player	2012	Shortlisted	
Manchester United
Sir Matt Busby Player of the Year		2003–04, 2006–07, 2007–08 and 2021–22	Won	
Manchester United	Players' Player of the Year	2006–07 and 2007–08	Won	
Manchester United	Player of the Month	Sep 2021, Oct 2021, Mar 2022, Apr 2022 and May 2022	Won	
Manchester United Supporters Club – Cyprus	Player of the Year	Unknown	Won	
Spain
La Liga Awards	Best Player	2013–14	Won	
La Liga Awards	Best Forward	2013–14	Won	
La Liga Awards	Most Valuable Player	2012–13	Won	
La Liga Player of the Month		Nov 2013, May 2015, and May 2017	Won	
La Liga Player of the Month		Mar 2018	Nominated	
Facebook Football Awards	La Liga Player of the Year	2016	Won	
Facebook Football Awards	La Liga Best Striker	2016	Won	
Marca	Trofeo Alfredo Di Stéfano	2011–12, 2012–13, 2013–14, and 2015–16	Won	
Marca	Trofeo Alfredo Di Stéfano	2010–11 and 2014–15	Runner-up	
Marca	Trofeo Alfredo Di Stéfano	2009–10	Third place	
Ibero-American
Trofeo EFE	best Latin-American player in Spanish football.	2012-13	Won	
Real Madrid
Mahou five star player		Dec 2017 and Mar 2018	Won	
Italy
Serie A Awards	Most Valuable Player	2018–19	Won	
Serie A Awards	Best Striker	2020–21	Won	
Gran Galà del Calcio	Serie A Footballer of the Year	2019 and 2020	Won	
Serie A Player of the Month		Jan 2020 and Nov 2020	Won	
Lega Serie A	Supercoppa Italiana Best Player	2020	Won	
Juventus
Juventus	MVP of the Year	2019–20 and 2020–21	Won	
Juventus	MVP of the Month	Sep 2018, Nov 2018, Dec 2018, Jan 2019, Mar 2019, Apr 2019, Dec 2019, Jan 2020, Feb 2020, Sep 2020, Nov 2020 and Feb 2021	Won	
Saudi Arabia
Globe Soccer Awards	Best Middle East Player	2023, 2024, 2025	Won	
Saudi Pro League Player of the Week		MD7/2025–26, MD9/2025–26	Won	
Saudi Pro League Player of the Month		Feb 2023, Aug 2023, Sep 2023, Dec 2023, Mar 2024 and May 2024	Won	
Friendly competitions
International Champions Cup	Best Player	2013	Won	

=== Goalscoring ===
==== Top goalscorer ====
Overall, Ronaldo has achieved 48 top goalscorer accolades.

Competition / award	Edition(s) / year(s)	Goals	Ref.
Domestic
Premier League (Golden Boot)	2007–08	31	
La Liga (Pichichi Trophy)	2010–11	40	
La Liga (Pichichi Trophy)	2013–14	31	
La Liga (Pichichi Trophy)	2014–15	48	
Serie A (Capocannoniere)	2020–21	29	
Saudi Pro League	2023–24	35	
Saudi Pro League	2024–25	25	
FA Cup	2004–05 (Note: Shared with Peter Crouch and Jermain Defoe.)	4	
Copa del Rey	2010–11 (Note: Shared with Lionel Messi.)	7	
Supercopa de España	2012	2	
Supercoppa Italiana	2018	1	
Supercoppa Italiana	2020 (Note: Shared with Álvaro Morata.)	1	
International
European Golden Shoe	2007–08	31	
European Golden Shoe	2010–11	40	
European Golden Shoe	2013–14 (Note: Shared with Luis Suárez (Liverpool).)	31	
European Golden Shoe	2014–15	48	
UEFA Champions League	2007–08	8	
UEFA Champions League	2012–13	12	
UEFA Champions League	2013–14	17	
UEFA Champions League	2014–15 (Note: Shared with Neymar and Lionel Messi.)	10	
UEFA Champions League	2015–16	16	
UEFA Champions League	2016–17	12	
UEFA Champions League	2017–18	15	
IFFHS World's Best Top Goal Scorer	2011	60	
IFFHS World's Best Top Goal Scorer	2013	69	
IFFHS World's Best Top Goal Scorer	2014	61	
IFFHS World's Best Top Goal Scorer	2015	57	
IFFHS World's Best Top Goal Scorer	2023	54	
IFFHS World's Best International Goal Scorer	2013	25	
IFFHS World's Best International Goal Scorer	2014	20	
IFFHS World's Best International Goal Scorer	2016	24	
IFFHS World's Best International Goal Scorer	2017	32	
IFFHS World's Best International Goal Scorer	2019	21	
IFFHS World's Best Top Division Goal Scorer	2013–14 (Note: Shared with Luis Suárez.)	31	
IFFHS World's Best Top Division Goal Scorer	2014–15	48	
IFFHS World's Best Top Division Goal Scorer	2020	33	
FIFA Club World Cup	2016	4	
FIFA Club World Cup	2017 (Note: Shared with Romarinho and Maurício Antônio.)	2	
UEFA European Championship (Golden Boot/Top Scorer Award)	2012 (Note: Ronaldo tied with five other players on goals; however, Spain's Fernando Torres registered more assists and played fewer minutes than others, earning the Golden Boot, while Germany's Mario Gómez and Russia's Alan Dzagoev received the Silver and Bronze Boots, respectively.)	3	
UEFA European Championship (Golden Boot/Top Scorer Award)	2020 (Note: Ronaldo and Czech Republic's Patrik Schick scored equal amounts of goals. Ronaldo, however, registered more assists and played fewer minutes than Schick, thus earning the Top Scorer Award.)	5	
UEFA European Championship Silver Boot	2016 (Note: Ronaldo scored as many goals as five other players. However, he had more assists than the others, hence the Silver Boot.)	3	
UEFA Nations League Finals	2019	3	
UEFA Nations League Finals	2025 (Note: Shared with Kylian Mbappé and Lamine Yamal.)	2	
UEFA Super Cup	2014	2	
Arab Club Champions Cup	2023	6	
Globe Soccer Maradona Award for Best Goal Scorer of the Year	2023	54	
Friendly competitions
World Football Challenge	2011	4	
International Champions Cup	2013	3	

==== Goal of the competition ====
Ronaldo has won many goal of the competition accolades, and was named runner-up for three nominations.

Competition/organisation/team	Category	Edition/year	Result	Ref.
Domestic
La Liga Awards	Best Goal	2013–14	Won	
Manchester United	Goal of the Season	2005–06, 2007–08, 2008–09 and 2021–22	Won	
Manchester United	Goal of the Month	October 2021 and February 2022	Won	
Manchester United	Goal of the Month	September 2021 (Note: Ronaldo was nominated twice in the same month.) and October 2021	Nominated	
Premier League	Goal of the Month	March 2022	Won	
Juventus	Goal of the Month	September 2018, October 2018, November 2018, March 2019 and December 2020	Won	
Gran Galà del Calcio	Goal of the Season	2018–19	Shortlisted	
Saudi Pro League	Goal of the Season	2025–26	Won	
International
The Best FIFA Football Awards	FIFA Puskás Award	2009	Won	
The Best FIFA Football Awards	FIFA Puskás Award	2018	Runner-up	
Globe Soccer Awards	Goal of the Year/Award of 433	2018	Won	
Union of European Football Associations	UEFA/UEFA.com Goal of the Season	2017–18	Won	
Union of European Football Associations	UEFA/UEFA.com Goal of the Season	2014–15	Runner-up	
Union of European Football Associations	Champions League Goal of the Season	2014–15, 2017–18 and 2018–19	Won	
Union of European Football Associations	Champions League Goal of the Season	2017–18	Tenth place	
Union of European Football Associations	Champions League Goal of the Season	2019–20	Nominated	
Union of European Football Associations	Champions League Goal of the Quarter-finals	2016–17	Won	
Union of European Football Associations	Champions League Goal of the Semi-finals	2016–17	Won	
Union of European Football Associations	European Championship Goal of the Tournament	2016	Fifth place	
Union of European Football Associations	European Championship Goal of the Tournament	2016	Eighth place	
Union of European Football Associations	European Championship Goal of the Tournament	2020	Nominated	
Union of European Football Associations	Nations League Finals Goal of the Tournament	2019	Won	
Union of European Football Associations	Nations League Finals Goal of the Tournament	2019	Runner-up	
Union of European Football Associations	Nations League Finals Goal of the Tournament	2019	Third place	
UEFA.com users	Champions League Goal of the Season	2019–20	Won	
International Federation of Association Football	World Cup Goal of the Tournament	2018	Fourth place	

==== Top assist provider ====
Competition	Edition	Assists	Ref
International
FIFA Club World Cup	2014 (Note: Ronaldo tied with Toni Kroos and Emiliano Tade on assists; however, Kroos played fewer minutes in the final competition and was thus ranked first by FIFA.)	2	

=== Inclusions in theoretical teams ===
Organisations	Category	Edition / year	Result	Ref.
International
France Football	Ballon d'Or Dream Team	2020	First team	
France Football	Fans' Ballon d'Or Dream Team	2020	Won	
Union of European Football Associations	Team of the Year	2004, 2007, 2008, 2009, 2010, 2011, 2012, 2013, 2014, 2015, 2016, 2017, 2018, 2019, and 2020	Won	
Union of European Football Associations	Team of the Year	2005 and 2006	Nominated	
Union of European Football Associations	Ultimate Team of the Year	2019	Won	
Union of European Football Associations	Champions League Squad of the Season	2013–14, 2014–15, 2015–16, 2016–17, 2017–18, and 2018–19	Won	
Union of European Football Associations	European Championship Team of the Tournament	2004, 2012, and 2016	Won	
Union of European Football Associations	Euro All Time XI	2016	Won	
Union of European Football Associations	Nations League Finals Team of the Tournament	2019	Won	
Union of European Football Associations	Nations League Finals FedEx Performance Zone Team of the Tournament	2019	Won	
International Federation of Association Football	FIFPRO World 11	2007, 2008, 2009, 2010, 2011, 2012, 2013, 2014, 2015, 2016, 2017, 2018, 2019, 2020, and 2021	Won	
International Federation of Association Football	FIFPRO World 11	2005 and 2006	Nominated	
International Federation of Association Football	World Cup Fan Dream Team	2018	Won	
International Federation of Football History & Statistics	All-time Men's World Dream Team	2021	Won	
International Federation of Football History & Statistics	All-time Men's UEFA Dream Team	2021	Won	
International Federation of Football History & Statistics	Men's World Team of the Decade (2011–20)	2020	Won	
International Federation of Football History & Statistics	Men's UEFA Team of the Decade (2011–20)	2020	Won	
International Federation of Football History & Statistics	Men's World Team	2017, 2018, 2019, 2020 and 2021	Won	
International Federation of Football History & Statistics	Men's UEFA Team	2020	Won	
European Sports Media	Team of the Season	2006–07, 2007–08, 2010–11, 2011–12, 2012–13, 2013–14, 2014–15, 2016–17, and 2018–19	Won	
Diario AS	11 LeyendAS	2021	Won	
Sports Illustrated	Team of the Decade	2000s, 2010s (Note: Includes Best club XI and Best international XI.)	Won	
France Football	Team of the Decade	2010s	Won	
L'Équipe	Team of the Year	2007, 2008, 2011, 2012, 2013, 2014, 2016, 2017, 2018, 2019, and 2020	Won	
FIFA	Team of the Year	2008, 2009, 2010, 2011, 2012, 2013, 2014, 2015, 2016, 2017, 2018, 2019, (Note: As the 12th player.) and 2020	Won	
Spain
La Liga Awards	Team of the Season	2013–14, 2014–15, and 2015–16	Won	
Union of European Football Associations	La Liga Team of The Season	2015–16 and 2016–17	Won	
England
Professional Footballers' Association	Team of the Year	2005–06 FA Premier League, 2006–07 FA Premier League, 2007–08 Premier League, and 2008–09 Premier League, 2021–22 Premier League	Won	
Premier League 20 Seasons Awards	Fantasy Team	2012 (Note: Two Fantasy Teams were chosen, one by a panel of judges and the other by public vote. Ronaldo was selected by both public and the panel.)	Won	
Italy
Gran Galà del Calcio	Serie A Team of the Year	2018–19, 2019–20, and 2020–21	Won	

=== Selections for international sportsperson of the year ===
Organisations	Category	Edition / year	Result	Ref.
Laureus World Sports Awards	Sportsman of the Year	2009, 2014, 2015, 2017, and 2018 (Note: While playing for Manchester United, Ronaldo was part of the team which was nominated for Laureus World Sports Award for Team of the Year in 2009, and in 2015, 2017 and 2018 was part of the Real Madrid team which was also nominated. Additionally, he captained the Portugal national team that was nominated in 2017.)	Nominated	
BBC Sports Personality of the Year	World Sport Star of the Year	2014	Won	
ESPY Awards	Best International Athlete	2014 and 2016	Won	
ESPY Awards	Best International Men's Soccer Player	2018 and 2021	Won	
Eurosport	World Star of the Year	2016	Won	
Polish Press Agency	European Sportsperson of the Year	2016 (Note: The first time a football player has been awarded the prize.) and 2017	Won	
Teen Choice Awards	Choice Male Athlete	2015, 2016, and 2017	Nominated	
Kids' Choice Sports Awards	Best Male Athlete	2016, 2017, and 2018	Nominated	

=== Selections for national sports personality of the year ===
Organisations	Category	Edition / year	Result	Ref.
Globos de Ouro	Portuguese Sportsman of the Year	2011, 2012, 2014, 2015, 2016, 2017, 2018, and 2019	Won	
Globos de Ouro	Portuguese Footballer of the Year	2007, 2008 and 2009	Won	
Portuguese Football Federation	Portuguese Player of the Year	2015, 2016, 2017, 2018 and 2019	Won	
Portuguese Football Federation	Highest scorer ever for Portugal	2022 and 2024	Won	
CNID Best Portuguese Athlete Abroad		2007, 2008, 2009, 2011, 2012, 2013, 2015, 2016, 2017, and 2018	Won	

=== Selections for international sportsperson of the decade or the last 25 years ===
Organisations	Category	Edition / year	Result	Ref.
Sky Sports	Sportsperson of the decade (2010–2019)	2019	Third place	
ESPN	Top 100 professional athletes since 2000	2024	Thirteenth place	
ESPN	Top 25 men's soccer players of the 21st century	2024	Second place	
The Sporting News	Top 25 athletes since 2000	2025	Ninth place	
Le Journal de Québec	Top 25 athletes since 2000	2025	Tenth place	

=== International man of the match awards ===
Date	Venue	Team	Opponent	Result	Competition	Ref.
21 May 2008	Luzhniki Stadium, Moscow, Russia	(England) Manchester United	(England) Chelsea	1–1 (a.e.t.) (Note: Manchester United won 6–5 on penalties)	2008 UEFA Champions League Final (Note: UEFA awarded two man of the match awards. Edwin Van der Sar was named as UEFA's Man of the Match, whereas Ronaldo received Fan's Man of the Match award.)	
11 June 2008	Stade de Genève, Geneva, Switzerland	Portugal	Czech Republic	3–1	UEFA Euro 2008	
15 June 2010	Nelson Mandela Bay Stadium, Port Elizabeth, South Africa	Portugal	Ivory Coast	0–0	2010 FIFA World Cup	
21 June 2010	Cape Town Stadium, Cape Town, South Africa	Portugal	North Korea	7–0	2010 FIFA World Cup	
25 June 2010	Moses Mabhida Stadium, Durban, South Africa	Portugal	Brazil	0–0	2010 FIFA World Cup	
17 June 2012	Metalist Stadium, Kharkiv, Ukraine	Portugal	Netherlands	2–1	UEFA Euro 2012	
21 June 2012	National Stadium, Warsaw, Poland	Portugal	Czech Republic	1–0	UEFA Euro 2012	
26 June 2014	Estádio Nacional Mané Garrincha, Brasília, Brazil	Portugal	Ghana	2–1	2014 FIFA World Cup	
12 August 2014	Cardiff City Stadium, Cardiff, Wales	(Spain) Real Madrid	(Spain) Sevilla	2–0	2014 UEFA Super Cup	
22 June 2016	Parc Olympique Lyonnais, Décines-Charpieu, France	Portugal	Hungary	3–3	UEFA Euro 2016	
6 July 2016	Parc Olympique Lyonnais, Décines-Charpieu, France	Portugal	Wales	2–0	UEFA Euro 2016	
18 December 2016	International Stadium Yokohama, Yokohama, Japan	(Spain) Real Madrid	(Japan) Kashima Antlers	4–2 (a.e.t.)	2016 FIFA Club World Cup Final	
3 June 2017	Millennium Stadium, Cardiff, Wales	(Spain) Real Madrid	(Italy) Juventus	4–1	2017 UEFA Champions League Final	
18 June 2017	Kazan Arena, Kazan, Russia	Portugal	Mexico	2–2	2017 FIFA Confederations Cup	
21 June 2017	Otkritie Arena, Moscow, Russia	Portugal	Russia	1–0	2017 FIFA Confederations Cup	
24 June 2017	Krestovsky Stadium, Saint Petersburg, Russia	Portugal	New Zealand	4–0	2017 FIFA Confederations Cup	
16 December 2017	Zayed Sports City Stadium, Abu Dhabi, United Arab Emirates	(Spain) Real Madrid	(Brazil) Grêmio	1–0	2017 FIFA Club World Cup Final	
15 June 2018	Fisht Olympic Stadium, Sochi, Russia	Portugal	Spain	3–3	2018 FIFA World Cup	
20 June 2018	Luzhniki Stadium, Moscow, Russia	Portugal	Morocco	1–0	2018 FIFA World Cup	
5 June 2019	Estádio do Dragão, Porto, Portugal	Portugal	Switzerland	3–1	2019 UEFA Nations League Finals	
7 August 2020	Juventus Stadium, Turin, Italy	(Italy) Juventus	(France) Lyon	2–1	2019–20 UEFA Champions League	
15 June 2021	Puskás Aréna, Budapest, Hungary	Portugal	Hungary	3–0	UEFA Euro 2020	
2 November 2021	Stadio Atleti Azzurri d'Italia, Bergamo, Italy	(England) Manchester United	(Italy) Atalanta	2–2	2021–22 UEFA Champions League	
23 November 2021	Estadio de la Cerámica, Villarreal, Spain	(England) Manchester United	(Spain) Villarreal	2–0	2021–22 UEFA Champions League	
24 November 2022	Stadium 974, Doha, Qatar	Portugal	Ghana	3–2	2022 FIFA World Cup	
9 August 2023	Prince Sultan bin Abdul Aziz Stadium, Abha, Saudi Arabia	(Saudi Arabia) Al Nassr	(Iraq) Al-Shorta	1–0	2023 Arab Club Champions Cup	
23 June 2026	NRG Stadium, Houston, United States	Portugal	Uzbekistan	5–0	2026 FIFA World Cup	
2 July 2026	BMO Field, Toronto, Canada	Portugal	Croatia	2–1	2026 FIFA World Cup	

=== Orders ===
- Medal of Merit, Order of the Immaculate Conception of Vila Viçosa (Portuguese Royal Family)
- Grand officer of the Order of Prince Henry
- Commander of the Order of Merit
- Officer of the Order of Prince Henry
- Cordão Autonómico de Distinção

=== Miscellaneous ===
Organisations	Category	Edition / year	Result	Ref.
The Best FIFA Football Awards	FIFA Special Award for an Outstanding Career Achievement	2021	Won	
Union of European Football Associations	Special Award of UEFA Champions League All-Time Top Scorer	2024	Won	
Gay Times	Sexiest Man Alive	2009	Won	
Globe Soccer Awards	Greatest Media Attraction	2011	Won	
Globe Soccer Awards	Fans' Favorite Player	2013, 2014, 2023	Won	
Globe Soccer Awards	Goodwill Award	2016	Won	
Globe Soccer Awards	Globe Soccer 433 Fans' Award	2018	Won	
Globe Soccer Awards	Top Goal Scorer of All-Time	2021, 2024	Won	
Sanitas	Healthiest Real Madrid player	2014–15 and 2015–16	Won	
La Liga Awards	Fans' Five Star Player	2014–15	Won	
Primeira Liga Awards	Special Award of Primeira Liga Best Player of All-Time	2025	Won	
Marca	Marca Leyenda	2019	Won	
Kids' Choice Sports Awards	King of Swag	2014, 2015, 2016, and 2017	Nominated	
Kids' Choice Sports Awards	Kids' Choice Sports Award for Clutch Player of the Year	2015	Nominated	
Kids' Choice Sports Awards	Kids' Choice Sports Award for Party Like a Sports Star	2014	Nominated	

== Records ==
As of 1 November 2026

Date	Record	Ref.
World records
2006–2026	Most FIFA World Cups scored in: 6	
7 October 2002 –	Most goals scored in all official senior competitions: 985 (Note: The identity of the record holder is disputed.)	
2015 –	Most goals scored after turning 30: 494	
2003–2026	Most men's international caps: 234 caps	
2004–2026	Most men's international goals scored: 146	
2004–2026	Most goals scored in the FIFA World Cup qualification: 41	
2008–2017	Most goals scored in the FIFA Club World Cup: 7	
6 September 2013 – 12 October 2021	First male player to score ten international hat-tricks	
2017	Most international (club or country) goals scored in a calendar year: 32	
	Only player to win the league title, domestic cup, domestic supercup, Champions League, Club World Cup, league player of the year, Golden Shoe and Ballon d'Or at two clubs (Manchester United and Real Madrid)	
2011–2017	Only player to score more than 50 goals in seven consecutive calendar years	
2016–2017	First player to score in consecutive FIFA Club World Cup Finals	
2004–2022	First player to score in ten, eleven, and twelve consecutive international tournaments	
2004–2026	Most different national teams scored against: 49	
2008–2024	First player to finish as top scorer in most first tier national leagues: 4	
2005–	Most penalty kick goals (excluding shoot-outs): 184	
2002–	Most headed goals: 160	
2002–	Most matches won by a player: 858	
2002–	Most matches unbeaten by a player: 1100	
	First player to score 100 goals for four different clubs: Real Madrid (450), Manchester United (145), Al-Nassr (138), Juventus (101)	
	First billionaire footballer	
European records
	Most appearances in all UEFA club competitions: 197	
	First player to reach 100 career wins in the UEFA Champions League	
	Most career wins by an individual in the UEFA Champions League/European Cup: 115	
12 April 2017	First player to reach 100 career goals in European club competitions	
18 April 2017	First player to reach 100 career goals in the UEFA Champions League	
14 February 2018	First player to reach 100 career goals for a single club in the UEFA Champions League	
9 August 2005 – 27 October 2022	Most goals scored in European club competitions: 145	
1 October 2003 – 15 March 2022	Most appearances in the UEFA Champions League: 183	
10 April 2007 – 23 November 2021	Most goals scored in the UEFA Champions League: 140	
2013–14	Most goals scored in a UEFA Champions League/European Cup season: 17	
2015–16	Most goals scored in group stage of a UEFA Champions League season: 11	
10 April 2007 – 7 August 2020	Most goals scored in UEFA Champions League knockout phase: 67	
2017	Most UEFA Champions League goals scored in a calendar year: 19	
	Most goals scored from penalty kicks in UEFA Champions League history: 19	
	Most goals scored from direct free kicks in UEFA Champions League history: 12	
	First and only player to score 15 or more UEFA Champions League goals in three seasons	
2016–17	First player to score a hat-trick in consecutive Champions League knockout matches	
2017–18	First player to score in all six group stage matches in the UEFA Champions League in a season	
2015–16	First and only player in the history of UEFA Champions League to score three hat-tricks in a single season	
	First and only player to finish UEFA Champions League top scorer in six consecutive seasons (from 2012–13 to 2017–18) and in seven seasons overall	
	Most goals scored in the UEFA Champions League quarter-finals: 25	
	Most goals scored in the UEFA Champions League semi-finals: 13	
	First and only player to score in three UEFA Champions League era Finals: in 2008, 2014, and 2017	
	First and only player to score ten goals against a single opponent (Juventus) in the UEFA Champions League	
	Most consecutive UEFA Champions League matches scored in: 11	
	Most UEFA Champions League hat-tricks scored by 30+ player: 6	
	First player to have won the European Golden Shoe in different leagues: English Premier League (2007–08) and Spanish La Liga (2010–11, 2013–14, 2014–15)	
2008–2021	First player to finish as top scorer in the Premier League, La Liga and Serie A	
2004–2024	Most appearances at UEFA European Championship finals tournaments: 30	
2004–2024	Most appearances in UEFA European Championship competition (including qualifying): 68	
2004–2021	Most goals scored in the UEFA European Championship, including qualifiers: 55	
2004–2021	Most career goals at UEFA European Championship finals tournaments: 14	
2006–2023	Most career goals in UEFA European Championship qualifiers: 41	
2004–2024	Most assists at UEFA European Championship finals tournaments: 7	
2004–2024	First player to have played at six UEFA European Championship finals tournaments	
	First and only player to have scored three or above (goals) at more than one UEFA European Championship finals tournaments: in 2012, 2016, and 2020	
	Most headed goals at UEFA European Championship finals tournaments: 5	
	First player to appear in three UEFA European Championship semi-finals: in 2004, 2012, and 2016 (Note: Germany's Bastian Schweinsteiger featured in his third last-four clash 24 hours later.)	
	Most successful kicks penalty shoot-outs at UEFA European Championship finals tournaments: 4	
	Most Man of the Match awards at the UEFA European Championship: 6 (Note: Shared with Andres Iniesta.)	
2006–2025	Most goals scored in UEFA European Championship and European FIFA World Cup qualifiers: 64	
	First player to ever score ten goals in four, five, six and seven consecutive UEFA Champions League seasons: from 2011–12 to 2017–18	
	First player to score for two winning teams in the UEFA Champions League/European Cup: Manchester United (2007–08) and Real Madrid (2013–14)	
2004, 2007–20	Most UEFA Team of the Year appearances: 15	
2007–2020	Most consecutive appearances in the UEFA Team of the Year: 14	
	First player to appear in more than one position in the UEFA Team of the Year	
	Fastest player to score 350 goals for one club: 335 matches	
	Most UEFA Best Player in Europe Award and UEFA Club Footballer of the Year awards: 4	
English records
December 2006	First player aged 21 or under to score at least twice in three consecutive Premier League appearances	
Spanish records
	Most goals scored from penalty kicks in La Liga history: 61	
	Fastest La Liga player to score 150 league goals: 140 matches	
	Fastest La Liga player to score 200 league goals: 178 matches	
	Fastest La Liga player to score 300 league goals: 286 matches	
	Most goals scored in Madrid Derby matches: 22	
	First player to score in six consecutive Clásicos	
2014–15	Fastest footballer to reach 15 league goals in one La Liga season: 8 rounds	
2014–15	Fastest footballer to reach 20 league goals in one La Liga season: 12 rounds (Note: Ronaldo missed one match due to injury.)	
	Only player to reach 30 goals in six consecutive La Liga seasons	
2012–13	Most teams scored against in a La Liga season: 19 (Note: Shared with Ronaldo Nazário and Lionel Messi.)	
	Most La Liga hat-tricks in a season: 8 hat-tricks	
Italian records
2018–19	Most consecutive away matches with at least one goal scored in a single Serie A season: 9 (Note: Shared with Giuseppe Signori.)	
2018–19	First player to score in seven consecutive away matches in a debut Serie A season	
2019–20	Most consecutive Serie A matches scored in: 11 (Note: Shared with Gabriel Batistuta and Fabio Quagliarella.)	
Saudian records
2023–24	Most goals scored in a single Saudi Pro League season: 35	
Portuguese records
6 February 2007 –	Most international caps as captain: 153 caps	
	Most recorded assists for the Portugal national team: 36	
2019	Most goals scored in a calendar year for the Portugal national team: 14	
2006–2022	Most matches played in World Cup finals: 22	
16 October 2012	Youngest player to reach 100 caps: 27 years, 8 months and 11 days	
Club records
Real Madrid
29 August 2009 – 19 May 2018	Real Madrid all-time top goalscorer: 450 goals (Note: Real Madrid attributes Ronaldo 451 goals, but his official number is 450.)	
15 September 2009 – 11 April 2018	Top goalscorer in UEFA Champions League: 105 goals	
29 August 2009 – 6 February 2011	Fastest player to reach 50 league goals	
29 August 2009 – 24 March 2012	Fastest player to reach 100 league goals	
29 August 2009 – 8 May 2013	Fastest player to reach 200 official goals	
16 April 2011 – 6 May 2018	Most goals scored in El Clásico matches: 18 (Note: Shared with Alfredo Di Stéfano.)	
	Most consecutive matches with goals: 12	
2014–15	First player to score in eight consecutive matchdays	
5 May 2010 – 18 March 2018	Most hat-tricks in La Liga: 34	
	Most goals scored from penalty kicks in UEFA Champions League: 14	
Juventus
2018–19	Fastest player to reach 10 official goals in all competitions: 16 appearances	
2019–20	Most goals scored in a season (in all competitions): 37	

== Goalscoring statistics ==
As of match played 20 November 2026

=== Club ===
Appearances and goals by club, season and competition
Club	Season	League			National Cup (Note: Includes Taça de Portugal, FA Cup, Copa del Rey, Coppa Italia and King Cup)		League Cup (Note: Includes Football League Cup)		Continental (Note: All appearances in UEFA Champions League, unless where noted)		Other (Note: Includes FA Community Shield, FIFA Club World Cup, Supercopa de España, UEFA Super Cup, Supercoppa Italiana, Saudi Super Cup and Arab Club Champions Cup)		Total	
Club	Season	Division	Apps	Goals	Apps	Goals	Apps	Goals	Apps	Goals	Apps	Goals	Apps	Goals
Sporting CP B	2002–03	Segunda Divisão	2	0	—		—		—		—		2	0
Sporting CP	2002–03	Primeira Liga	25	3	3	2	—		3 (Note: One appearance in UEFA Champions League third qualifying round, two appearances in UEFA Cup)	0	0	0	31	5
Manchester United	2003–04	Premier League	29	4	5	2	1	0	5	0	0	0	40	6
Manchester United	2004–05	Premier League	33	5	7	4	2	0	8 (Note: Includes one appearance in UEFA Champions League third qualifying round)	0	0	0	50	9
Manchester United	2005–06	Premier League	33	9	2	0	4	2	8 (Note: Includes two appearances and one goal in UEFA Champions League third qualifying round)	1	—		47	12
Manchester United	2006–07	Premier League	34	17	7	3	1	0	11	3	—		53	23
Manchester United	2007–08	Premier League	34	31	3	3	0	0	11	8	1 (Note: Appearance in FA Community Shield)	0	49	42
Manchester United	2008–09	Premier League	33	18	2	1	4	2	12	4	2 (Note: Appearances in FIFA Club World Cup)	1	53	26
Manchester United	Total		196	84	26	13	12	4	55	16	3	1	292	118
Real Madrid	2009–10	La Liga	29	26	0	0	—		6	7	—		35	33
Real Madrid	2010–11	La Liga	34	40 (Note: Does not include one goal scored on 18 September 2010 against Real Sociedad. Marca, which awards the Pichichi Trophy, attribute it to Ronaldo, while La Liga and UEFA attribute it to Pepe.)	8	7	—		12	6	—		54	53
Real Madrid	2011–12	La Liga	38	46	5	3	—		10	10	2 (Note: Appearances in Supercopa de España)	1	55	60
Real Madrid	2012–13	La Liga	34	34	7	7	—		12	12	2	2	55	55
Real Madrid	2013–14	La Liga	30	31	6	3	—		11	17	—		47	51
Real Madrid	2014–15	La Liga	35	48	2	1	—		12	10	5 (Note: One appearance and two goals in UEFA Super Cup, two appearances in Supercopa de España, two appearances in FIFA Club World Cup)	2	54	61
Real Madrid	2015–16	La Liga	36	35	0	0	—		12	16	—		48	51
Real Madrid	2016–17	La Liga	29	25	2	1	—		13	12	2	4	46	42
Real Madrid	2017–18	La Liga	27	26	0	0	—		13	15	4 (Note: One appearance in UEFA Super Cup, one appearance and one goal in Supercopa de España, two appearances and two goals in FIFA Club World Cup)	3	44	44
Real Madrid	Total		292	311	30	22	—		101	105	15	12	438	450
Juventus	2018–19	Serie A	31	21	2	0	—		9	6	1 (Note: Appearance in Supercoppa Italiana)	1	43	28
Juventus	2019–20	Serie A	33	31	4	2	—		8	4	1	0	46	37
Juventus	2020–21	Serie A	33	29	4	2	—		6	4	1	1	44	36
Juventus	2021–22	Serie A	1	0	0	0	—		0	0	0	0	1	0
Juventus	Total		98	81	10	4	—		23	14	3	2	134	101
Manchester United	2021–22	Premier League	30	18	1	0	0	0	7	6	0	0	38	24
Manchester United	2022–23	Premier League	10	1	0	0	0	0	6	2	0	0	16	3
Manchester United	Total		40	19	1	0	0	0	13	8	0	0	54	27
Al-Nassr	2022–23	Saudi Pro League	16	14	2	0	—		—		1 (Note: Appearance(s) in Saudi Super Cup)	0	19	14
Al-Nassr	2023–24	Saudi Pro League	31	35	4	3	—		9 (Note: Appearances in AFC Champions League)	6	7 (Note: Six appearances and six goals in Arab Club Champions Cup, one appearance in Saudi Super Cup)	6	51	50
Al-Nassr	2024–25	Saudi Pro League	30	25	1	0	—		8	8	2	2	41	35
Al-Nassr	2025–26	Saudi Pro League	30	28	1	0	—		4 (Note: Appearances in AFC Champions League Two)	1	2	1	37	30
Al-Nassr	2026–27	Saudi Pro League	11	9	0	0	—		2	1	0	0	13	10
Al-Nassr	Total		118	111	8	3	—		23	16	12	9	161	139
Career total			771	609	78	44	12	4	218	159	33	24	1112	840

=== Country ===
Season	Tournament		Qualifiers		Friendlies		Total	
Season	Apps	Goals	Apps	Goals	Apps	Goals	Apps	Goals
2003–04	6	2	0	0	7	0	13	2
2004–05	0	0	8	7	2	0	10	7
2005–06	6	1	4	0	5	2	15	3
2006–07	0	0	6	5 (Note: Ronaldo scored another goal against Azerbaijan on 7 October. The goal, however, was wrongly disallowed because the referee initially deemed the ball hadn't crossed the line.)	2	0	8	5
2007–08	3	1	7	3	2	0	12	4
2008–09	0	0	4	0	3	1	7	1
2009–10	4	1	3	0	4	0	11	1
2010–11	0	0	3	2	2	1	5	3
2011–12	5	3	5	5	4	1	14	9
2012–13	0	0	6	1	3	3	9	4
2013–14	3	1	4	7	3	3	10	11
2014–15	0	0	4	5	2	0	6	5
2015–16	7	3	2	0	4	3	13	6
2016–17	4	2	5	11	1	1	10	14
2017–18	4	4	4	4	3	2	11	10
2018–19	2	3	2	0	0	0	4	3
2019–20	0	0	6	11	0	0	6	11
2020–21	8	7	3	1 (Note: Ronaldo scored a goal against Serbia on 27 March. Due to the absence of goal-line technology, however, the goal was wrongly disallowed. The referee Danny Makkelie later apologised for the mistake.)	4	2	15	10
2021–22	0	0	6	5	1	1	7	6
2022–23	10	3	4	5	0	0	14	8
2023–24	5	0	5	5	2	2	12	7
2024–25	9	8	0	0	0	0	9	8
2025–26	5	3	5	5	2	0	12	8
2026–27	1	0	0	0	0	0	1	0
Total	82	42	96	82	56	22	234	146

Source: Rec.Sport.Soccer Statistics Foundation

=== Detailed statistics ===
Extended content

Table key
International

Goals by team
Team	Goals
(Spain) Real Madrid	450
Portugal	146
(England) Manchester United	145
(Saudi Arabia) Al-Nassr	139
(Italy) Juventus	101
(Portugal) Sporting CP	5
Total	986

Goals by competition
Competition	Goals
La Liga	311
UEFA Champions League	140
Saudi Pro League	111
Premier League	103
Serie A	81
FIFA World Cup qualifying	41
UEFA European Championship qualifying	41
Copa del Rey	22
International friendly	22
AFC Champions League Elite	15
UEFA European Championship	14
FA Cup	13
FIFA World Cup	11
UEFA Nations League	10
FIFA Club World Cup	7
Arab Club Champions Cup	6
UEFA Nations League Finals	5
Coppa Italia	4
EFL Cup	4
Supercopa de España	4
King Cup	3
Primeira Liga	3
Saudi Super Cup	3
FIFA Confederations Cup (defunct)	2
Supercoppa Italiana	2
Taça de Portugal	2
UEFA Europa League	2
UEFA Super Cup	2
AFC Champions League Two	1
UEFA Champions League qualifying	1
Total (30 competitions)	986

Goals by year
Year	Goals
2002	5
2003	1
2004	13
2005	15
2006	25
2007	34
2008	35
2009	30
2010	48
2011	60
2012	63
2013	69
2014	61
2015	57
2016	55
2017	53
2018	49
2019	39
2020	44
2021	47
2022	16
2023	54
2024	43
2025	41
2026	29
Total	986

Goals by opponent
Opponent	Goals
(Spain) Sevilla	27
(Spain) Atlético Madrid	25
(Spain) Getafe	23
(Spain) Barcelona	20
(Spain) Celta Vigo	20
(Spain) Athletic Bilbao	17
(Spain) Málaga	17
(Spain) Espanyol	15
(Spain) Real Sociedad	15
(Spain) Valencia	15
(Spain) Villarreal	15
(Spain) Levante	14
(England) Tottenham Hotspur	14
(Spain) Deportivo La Coruña	13
(Spain) Granada	12
(Spain) Osasuna	12
(Spain) Rayo Vallecano	12
Luxembourg	11
(Saudi Arabia) Al Wehda	10
(Italy) Juventus	10
(Italy) Roma	10
(Netherlands) Ajax	9
(Saudi Arabia) Al Fateh	9
(England) Arsenal	9
(England) Aston Villa	9
(Germany) Bayern Munich	9
(Saudi Arabia) Damac	9
Hungary	9
(Saudi Arabia) Al Shabab	8
(Italy) Cagliari	8
(England) Newcastle United	8
(Saudi Arabia) Al-Khaleej	7
(Saudi Arabia) Al-Okhdood	7
(Spain) Almería	7
Armenia	7
(Germany) Borussia Dortmund	7
(Spain) Eibar	7
(Spain) Elche	7
(England) Fulham	7
Lithuania	7
(Spain) Mallorca	7
(Germany) Schalke 04	7
Sweden	7
(Italy) Udinese	7
(England) Wigan Athletic	7
(Spain) Zaragoza	7
(Saudi Arabia) Al-Ahli	6
(Saudi Arabia) Al-Fayha	6
(Saudi Arabia) Al-Hilal	6
(Saudi Arabia) Al-Ittihad	6
(Saudi Arabia) Al-Riyadh	6
Andorra	6
(Cyprus) APOEL	6
(Italy) Atalanta	6
(England) Bolton Wanderers	6
(England) Everton	6
(Turkey) Galatasaray	6
(France) Lyon	6
(Sweden) Malmö FF	6
(Italy) Milan	6
(Italy) Parma	6
(England) Portsmouth	6
(Spain) Racing Santander	6
(Spain) Real Betis	6
(Italy) Sassuolo	6
(Spain) Sporting Gijón	6
(England) West Ham United	6
(Saudi Arabia) Abha	5
(Spain) Alavés	5
(Saudi Arabia) Al-Kholood	5
(Saudi Arabia) Al-Tai	5
(Italy) Genoa	5
(Italy) Internazionale	5
Latvia	5
(Italy) Lazio	5
(England) Manchester City	5
(England) Middlesbrough	5
(Italy) Sampdoria	5
(Ukraine) Shakhtar Donetsk	5
Switzerland	5
(Saudi Arabia) Al-Hazem	4
(Saudi Arabia) Al Raed	4
(Saudi Arabia) Al Taawoun	4
Bosnia and Herzegovina	4
Denmark	4
(England) Derby County	4
(Ukraine) Dynamo Kyiv	4
Estonia	4
Faroe Islands	4
(Spain) Girona	4
(France) Marseille	4
(Italy) Napoli	4
Netherlands	4
(England) Norwich City	4
Poland	4
(England) Reading	4
Republic of Ireland	4
Spain	4
(Italy) Torino	4
(England) West Bromwich Albion	4
(Spain) Xerez	4
(Saudi Arabia) Al-Ettifaq	3
(Saudi Arabia) Al-Najma	3
(United Arab Emirates) Al Wasl	3
Belgium	3
(England) Blackburn Rovers	3
(Denmark) Copenhagen	3
Croatia	3
(Russia) CSKA Moscow	3
(Italy) Fiorentina	3
(Italy) Hellas Verona	3
(Japan) Kashima Antlers	3
(Spain) Las Palmas	3
Liechtenstein	3
(England) Liverpool	3
(England) Manchester United	3
Northern Ireland	3
(France) Paris Saint-Germain	3
Russia	3
Slovakia	3
(Italy) SPAL	3
(Italy) Spezia	3
(Portugal) Sporting CP	3
(Spain) Valladolid	3
(Germany) VfL Wolfsburg	3
(Saudi Arabia) Al-Adalah	2
(United Arab Emirates) Al Ain	2
(Qatar) Al-Duhail	2
(Qatar) Al-Gharafa	2
(Saudi Arabia) Al Qadsiah	2
Azerbaijan	2
(Switzerland) Basel	2
(Germany) Bayer Leverkusen	2
(England) Birmingham City	2
(Italy) Bologna	2
Cameroon	2
(England) Chelsea	2
(Italy) Crotone	2
Cyprus	2
Czech Republic	2
Egypt	2
(Italy) Empoli	2
France	2
(Italy) Frosinone	2
Germany	2
Ghana	2
(Spain) Hércules	2
(England) Hull City	2
Iceland	2
Kazakhstan	2
(Bulgaria) Ludogorets Razgrad	2
(Portugal) Moreirense	2
Saudi Arabia	2
(Moldova) Sheriff Tiraspol	2
(England) Southampton	2
(England) Stoke City	2
Uzbekistan	2
(England) Watford	2
(Switzerland) Zürich	2
(Saudi Arabia) Al Faisaly	1
(United Arab Emirates) Al-Jazira	1
(Saudi Arabia) Al-Orobah	1
(Qatar) Al-Rayyan	1
(Iraq) Al-Shorta	1
(Mexico) América	1
Argentina	1
(France) Auxerre	1
(Portugal) Boavista	1
(England) Brentford	1
(England) Brighton	1
(England) Burnley	1
(England) Charlton Athletic	1
(Spain) Córdoba	1
(Hungary) Debrecen	1
(Saudi Arabia) Diriyah	1
Ecuador	1
(Portugal) Estarreja	1
(Iran) Esteghlal	1
(England) Exeter City	1
(Hungary) Ferencváros	1
Finland	1
(Japan) Gamba Osaka	1
Greece	1
(Brazil) Grêmio	1
Iran	1
Israel	1
(Tajikistan) Istiklol	1
(Italy) Lecce	1
(England) Millwall	1
Morocco	1
(Spain) Murcia	1
(Uzbekistan) Neftchi	1
(Saudi Arabia) Neom	1
New Zealand	1
North Korea	1
(Portugal) Oliveira do Hospital	1
Panama	1
(Spain) Ponferradina	1
(Portugal) Porto	1
Qatar	1
(Morocco) Raja	1
Scotland	1
Serbia	1
(England) Sunderland	1
(Spain) Tenerife	1
Ukraine	1
(Tunisia) Union Monastirienne	1
Wales	1
(Japan) Yokohama Marinos	1
(Switzerland) Young Boys	1
(Egypt) Zamalek	1
Total (211 opponents)	986

== Gallery ==
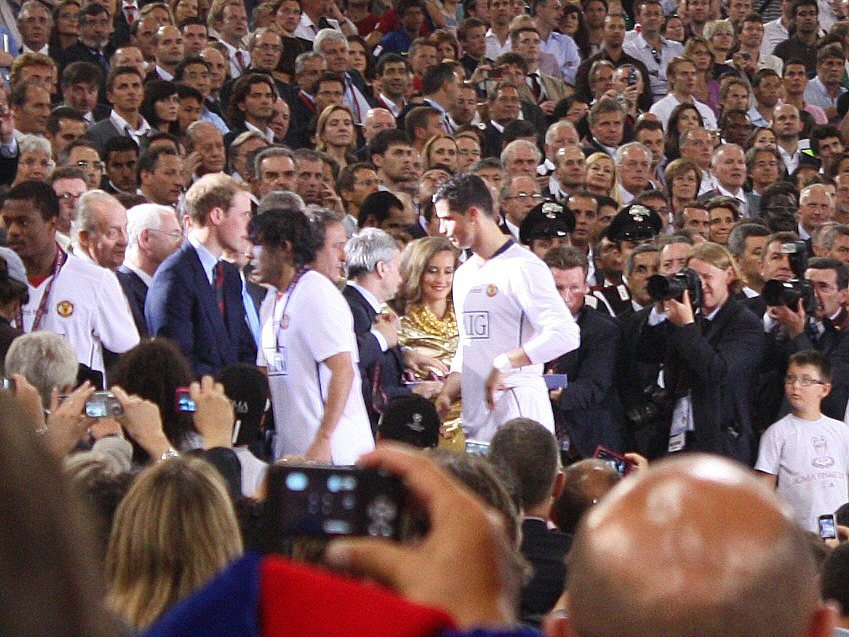
Prince William looks on as Ronaldo receives his runners-up medal from UEFA President Michel Platini after the 2009 UEFA Champions League Final.

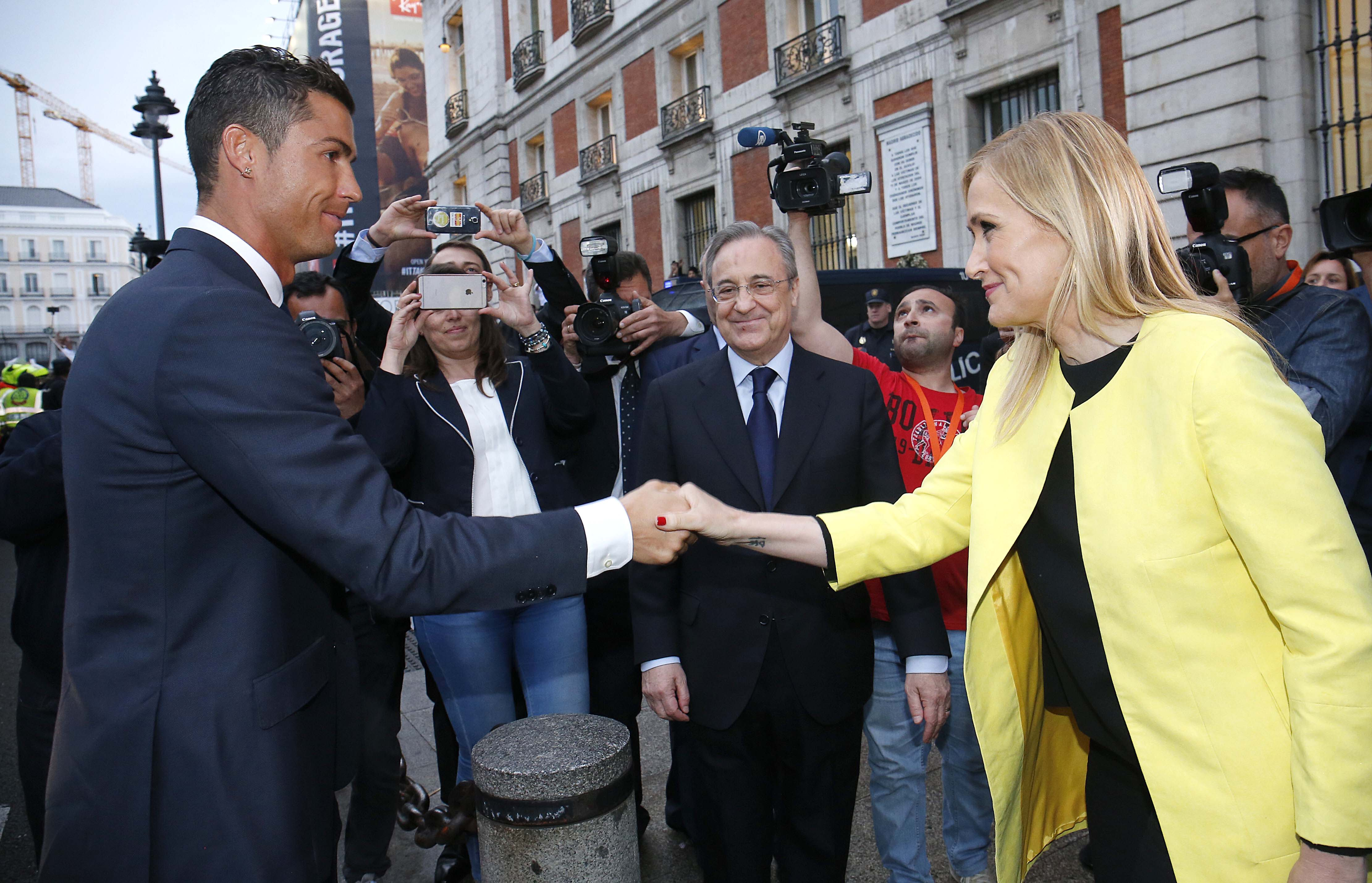
Ronaldo with then President of the Community of Madrid, Cristina Cifuentes, during Champions League title celebrations in Madrid in 2016

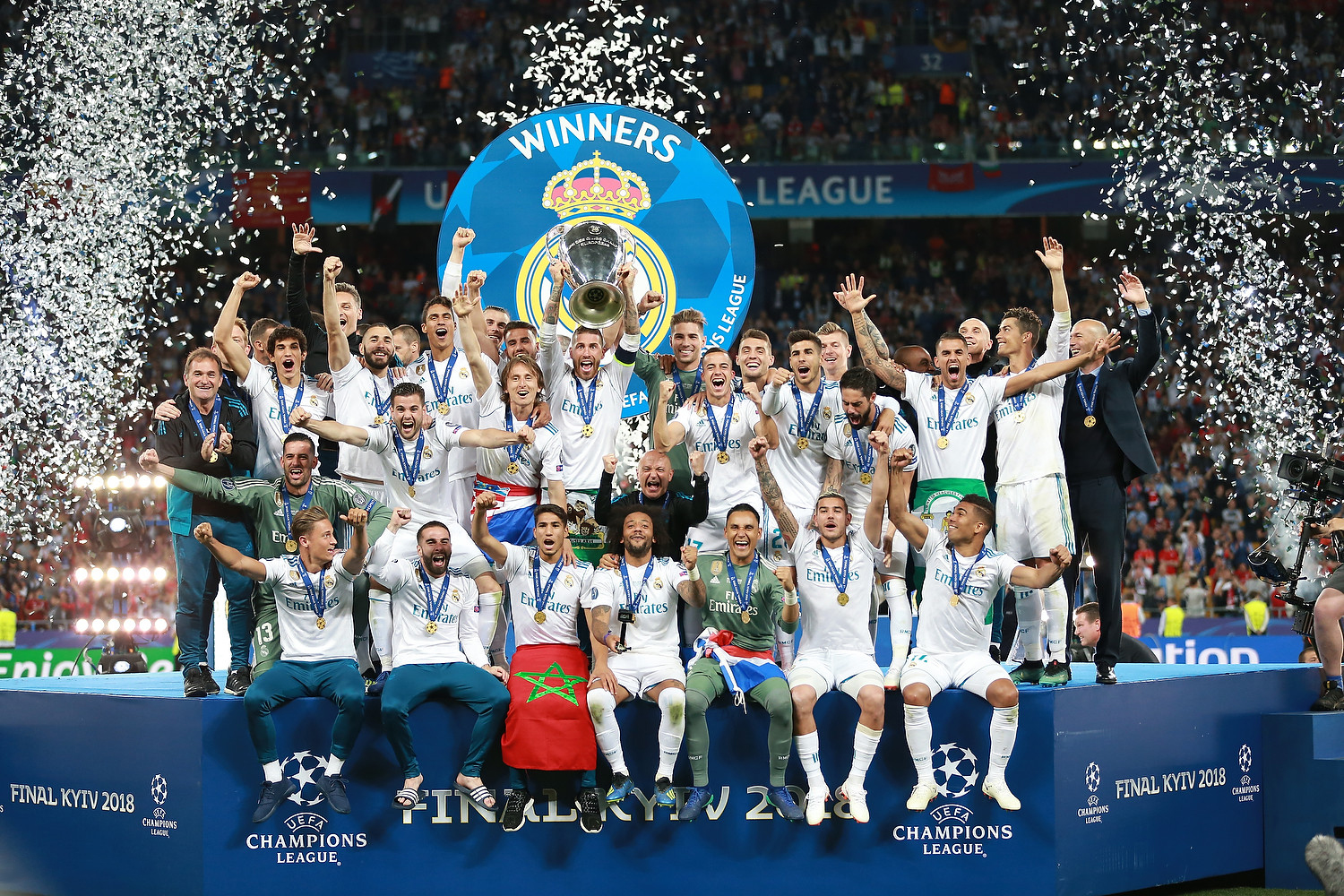
Ronaldo (second from the right) raising his hand in the air as Real Madrid celebrate winning the UEFA Champions League, on 26 May 2018

== See also ==
- Museu CR7 – a museum that is dedicated to Cristiano Ronaldo's trophies
