= Cédric Bakambu =

Footballer (born 1991)

- Bakambu with San Diego FC in 2026

Personal information
- Full name: Cédric Bakambu
- Date of birth: 11 April 1991 (age 35)
- Place of birth: Vitry-sur-Seine, France
- Height: 1.82 m (6 ft 0 in)
- Positions: Forward; winger

Team information
- Current team: San Diego FC
- Number: 94

Youth career
- 2000–2006: Ivry
- 2006–2010: Sochaux

Senior career*
Years	Team	Apps	(Gls)
2010–2014	Sochaux	94	(18)
2010–2014	Sochaux II	28	(15)
2014–2015	Bursaspor	27	(13)
2015–2018	Villarreal	75	(32)
2018–2022	Beijing Guoan	71	(48)
2022	Marseille	15	(4)
2022–2023	Olympiacos	32	(18)
2023	Al-Nasr	0	(0)
2023–2024	Galatasaray	10	(1)
2024–2026	Betis	47	(5)
2026–	San Diego FC	9	(4)

International career^{‡}
2009	France U18	5	(1)
2009–2010	France U19	16	(4)
2010–2011	France U20	17	(3)
2015–	DR Congo	73	(21)
Medal record
Men's football
Representing France
UEFA European Under-19 Championship
Winner	2010 France
- * Club domestic league appearances and goals as of 03:03, 29 October 2026 (UTC) ‡ National team caps and goals as of 23:35, 17 November 2026 (UTC)

Cédric Bakambu (born 11 April 1991) is a professional footballer who plays as a forward or a winger for Major League Soccer club San Diego FC and the DR Congo national team.

Bakambu made his professional debut for Sochaux in 2010, and played 107 official games for them over five seasons, scoring 21 goals. He then moved to Bursaspor for €1.8 million, finishing as top scorer as his team came runners-up in the Turkish Cup, before signing for Villarreal a year later.

Born in France, Bakambu represented them internationally at youth level up to the under-20s, scoring eight goals in 38 games and winning the 2010 UEFA European Championship for the under-19s.

In 2015, Bakambu made his senior debut for the DR Congo national team.

== Club career ==
=== Sochaux ===
Born in Vitry-sur-Seine, Val-de-Marne, France, Bakambu began his career at local Ivry at the age of 10 before transferring to Sochaux four years later.

On 1 May 2010, Bakambu played in the 2010 Coupe Gambardella Final and scored a goal for his team at the Stade de France. Sochaux, however, lost the match 4–3 on penalties. He had previously scored a double in the team's 4–3 aggregate semi-final victory over Metz.

Bakambu made his professional debut on 7 August 2010 in Sochaux's opening match of the Ligue 1 season against Arles-Avignon, appearing as an 83rd-minute substitute for Modibo Maïga in a 2–1 win at the Stade Auguste Bonal. The following month, he signed his first professional contract agreeing to a three-year deal with the club until June 2013.

On 17 September 2011, Bakambu scored his first professional goal, the first equaliser in a 2–2 draw at Lille OSC, eleven minutes after replacing Carlāo. A year and nine days later, as a 66th-minute replacement for King Osanga, he scored twice in a 3–2 extra-time home win over Evian in the third round of the Coupe de la Ligue.

Bakambu scored seven goals in 31 appearances over the 2013–14 Ligue 1 season, in which Sochaux were relegated; this included two on 21 December in a 2–1 home win over Rennes. Across the campaign, he was placed on the right wing by manager Hervé Renard until he would become sufficiently mentally mature for a centre-forward role. On 23 March, he was sent off for handball in a 2–1 loss at Saint-Étienne.

=== Bursaspor ===
On 1 September 2014, Bakambu left France for the first time, moving on a four-year transfer to Turkey's Bursaspor for a fee of €1.8 million and an annual salary of €800,000. He made his debut in the Süper Lig twelve days later, replacing Ozan İpek in the 55th minute of a 2–1 win at Gençlerbirliği. His first goals for the "Green Crocodiles" came on 19 October, in either half of a 2–2 draw against Eskişehirspor at the Bursa Atatürk Stadium, and six days later he scored a first professional hat-trick in a 5–0 win at Balıkesirspor. He finished his only league season in Bursa with 13 goals in 27 games.

In that season's domestic cup, Bakambu was the top scorer with eight goals in 12 games as his team reached the final before a 3–2 home loss to Galatasaray. This tally included trebles in a 5–0 win at Mersin İdmanyurdu on 27 January and a 3–0 victory over Fatih Karagümrük nine days later, both in the group stage. As Galatasaray won the double, Bursaspor faced them in the 2015 Turkish Super Cup on 8 August, with Bakambu playing the whole of the 1–0 loss.

=== Villarreal ===
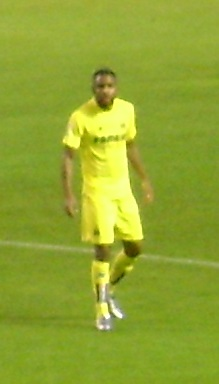
Bakambu in action for Villarreal in December 2015.

On 19 August 2015, Spanish side Villarreal announced the signing of Bakambu on a five-year contract. He made his La Liga debut four days later, replacing Léo Baptistão in the 61st minute of a 1–1 draw at Real Betis in the first game of the season; on the 28th he came on for the same player and scored two goals in the closing minutes of the fixture against Espanyol at Estadio El Madrigal, to secure a 3–1 victory for the "Yellow Submarine".

Bakambu played his first game in European competition on 17 September, again as a substitute in a 2–1 loss at Rapid Wien in the group stage of that season's UEFA Europa League. On 22 October, he scored his first goals in the tournament, a first-half double in a 4–0 home win over Dinamo Minsk; he added another two the following 10 March against Bayer Leverkusen in the first leg of the last 16 (2–0 win, same aggregate). In the quarter-finals, he scored twice in each leg of a 6–3 aggregate win over Sparta Prague. He was one of four strikers named in the competition's Squad of the Season, and his nine goals put him only one behind the top scorer, Athletic Bilbao's Aritz Aduriz.

On 1 October 2017, Bakambu scored a hat-trick in a 3–0 home win over Eibar. He then scored two goals in a 2–1 win at Girona and another in a 4–0 win over Las Palmas to be named La Liga Player of the Month, the first African to win the award.

In early January 2018, Villarreal manager Javier Calleja revealed that Bakambu was going through a transfer to Beijing Sinobo Guoan (Note: In March 2021, Beijing Sinobo Guoan changed its name to Beijing Guoan.) of the Chinese Super League. On 17 January 2018, Bakambu rescinded his contract with Villarreal. Two weeks later, however, Beijing Guoan still had not announced the signing of Bakambu, who had already played and scored for the club. It was reported that Beijing Guoan were trying to avoid paying a 100 percent tax placed on incoming transfers worth over 45 million yuan (US$7 million) by the Chinese Football Association. The transfer went through in time for the start of the Chinese season with the full fees being paid.

=== Beijing Guoan ===
On 28 February 2018, the final day of the Chinese transfer window, Bakambu's protracted transfer from Villarreal to Beijing Sinobo Guoan was finally confirmed with the club paid his €40 million release clause, but Beijing did not announce the Congolese forward's signing amid confusion over whether they had to pay a 100 per cent levy on the transfer.

He scored his first goal in China in his second game, in a 2–1 win over Jiangsu Suning. He won the Chinese FA Cup in his first season.

=== Marseille ===
On 13 January 2022, Bakambu signed for French club Marseille on a contract until 30 June 2024. He scored in his first appearance for the club, after coming on as a substitute in a 2-0 win over Lens.

=== Olympiacos ===
On 16 September 2022, Bakambu signed for Greek club Olympiacos on a contract until 30 June 2025.

=== Al-Nasr ===
On 29 June 2023, UAE Pro League club Al-Nasr announced that Bakambu had signed a two-year contract with the club.

=== Galatasaray ===
On 22 July 2023, it was announced by Turkish club Galatasaray that negotiations with its club Al-Nasr for an agreement were started. A day later, Bakambu transferred to Süper Lig club Galatasaray on a permanent basis. He signed a two-year contract for a €700,000 fee. On 2 August, he made his debut in a Champions League qualifying match against Žalgiris Vilnius. On 8 November, he scored his first Champions League goal in the 93rd minute of stoppage time in a 2–1 away defeat against Bayern Munich.

=== Betis ===
On 1 February 2024, Bakambu signed a two-and-a-half-year contract with Real Betis. He scored seven goals in the 2024–25 UEFA Europa Conference League campaign as the club reached the final.

=== San Diego FC ===
On 3 September 2026, Bakambu signed a two-year contract with Major League Soccer club San Diego FC.

== International career ==
Bakambu was a French youth international and has represented the country at both under-18 and under-19 level. He was a part of the team that won the 2010 UEFA European Under-19 Championship on home soil. On 18 July, he scored twice in a 4–1 opening win over the Netherlands in Caen, and the 2–1 winner against Croatia in the semi-finals nine days later, also at the Stade Michel d'Ornano. He was also part of the team that came fourth at the 2011 FIFA U-20 World Cup in Colombia, opening a 2–0 win over Mali in the last group game in Cali.

In March 2015, he opted to represent DR Congo at senior level. On arrival in Kinshasa he was greeted by fans with banners of him, later reflecting "I hadn't even played a match yet they made banners for me. It's really something else. It was through football that I discovered my country."

He was first called up in June ahead of a friendly against Cameroon on the 9th, and started that match, a 1–1 draw at the Stade Charles Tondreau in Mons, Belgium.

On 26 March the following year, Bakambu scored his first international goal, opening a 2–1 win over Angola at the Stade des Martyrs with a penalty, in qualification for the 2017 Africa Cup of Nations. He added two more on 5 June, in a 6–1 win away to Madagascar. He was chosen in Florent Ibengé's squad for the final tournament in Gabon, and started in the opening group match, a 1–0 win over Morocco at the Stade d'Oyem. He then did not play again until a seven-minute run in the quarter-finals where the Congolese lost 2–1 to Ghana.

On 24 March 2019, Bakambu returned to action for DR Congo after missing previous qualifiers vs. rivals Congo to injury. He started and scored the winner in a 1–0 victory against Liberia. This secured The Leopards' qualification to the 2019 Africa Cup of Nations, at the expense of their opponents.

On 1 April 2022, following DR Congo's elimination from 2022 FIFA World Cup qualification at the hands of Morocco, Bakambu announced his retirement from the national team, a decision he later reversed.

On 17 January 2024, Bakambu assisted Brentford forward, Yoane Wissa for the equaliser in DR. Congo's 1-1 draw with Zambia in the opening round of group games at the 2023 Africa Cup of Nations.

On May 19, 2026, he was included in the 26-man squad selected by head coach Sébastien Desabre to represent the DR Congo at the 2026 FIFA World Cup.

== Personal life ==
Born in France to parents from the DR Congo, Bakambu said "I grew up with both cultures and I am very proud of that. I think it's something that enriches you."

Bakambu and international teammate Dieumerci Mbokani were at Brussels Airport when it was struck by terror attacks in March 2016; both escaped unharmed.

== Career statistics ==
=== Club ===
As of match played 28 October 2026

Appearances and goals by club, season and competition
Club	Season	League			National cup (Note: Includes Coupe de France, Turkish Cup, Copa del Rey, Greek Cup)		League cup (Note: Includes Coupe de la Ligue)		Continental		Other		Total	
Club	Season	Division	Apps	Goals	Apps	Goals	Apps	Goals	Apps	Goals	Apps	Goals	Apps	Goals
Sochaux	2010–11	Ligue 1	9	0	2	0	0	0	—		—		11	0
Sochaux	2011–12	Ligue 1	21	3	1	0	1	0	—		—		23	3
Sochaux	2012–13	Ligue 1	33	8	3	1	2	2	—		—		38	11
Sochaux	2013–14	Ligue 1	31	7	2	0	2	0	—		—		35	7
Sochaux	Total		94	18	8	1	5	2	—		—		107	21
Sochaux II	2010–11	CFA	22	7	—		—		—		—		22	7
Sochaux II	2011–12	CFA	5	4	—		—		—		—		5	4
Sochaux II	2013–14	CFA	1	4	—		—		—		—		1	4
Sochaux II	Total		28	15	—		—		—		—		28	15
Bursaspor	2014–15	Süper Lig	27	13	12	8	—		—		—		39	21
Bursaspor	2015–16	Süper Lig	0	0	0	0	—		—		1 (Note: Appearance in Turkish Super Cup)	0	1	0
Bursaspor	Total		27	13	12	8	—		—		1	0	40	21
Villarreal	2015–16	La Liga	34	12	3	1	—		13 (Note: Appearances in UEFA Europa League)	9	—		50	22
Villarreal	2016–17	La Liga	26	11	1	1	—		7	0	—		34	12
Villarreal	2017–18	La Liga	15	9	1	2	—		5	3	—		21	14
Villarreal	Total		75	32	5	4	—		25	12	—		105	48
Beijing Guoan	2018	Chinese Super League	23	19	5	4	—		—		—		28	23
Beijing Guoan	2019	Chinese Super League	16	10	3	3	—		6 (Note: Appearance(s) in AFC Champions League)	3	1 (Note: Appearance in Chinese FA Super Cup)	0	26	16
Beijing Guoan	2020	Chinese Super League	19	14	0	0	—		1	0	—		20	14
Beijing Guoan	2021	Chinese Super League	13	5	0	0	—		—		—		13	5
Beijing Guoan	Total		71	48	8	7	—		7	3	1	0	87	58
Marseille	2021–22	Ligue 1	12	4	2	0	—		7 (Note: Appearance(s) in UEFA Europa Conference League)	0	—		21	4
Marseille	2022–23	Ligue 1	3	0	0	0	—		0	0	—		3	0
Marseille	Total		15	4	2	0	—		7	0	—		24	4
Olympiacos	2022–23	Super League Greece	32	18	5	0	—		0	0	—		37	18
Galatasaray	2023–24	Süper Lig	10	1	0	0	—		6 (Note: Appearances in UEFA Champions League)	1	0	0	16	2
Real Betis	2023–24	La Liga	4	0	—		—		1	1	—		5	1
Real Betis	2024–25	La Liga	25	2	3	1	—		14 (Note: Appearances in UEFA Conference League)	7	—		42	10
Real Betis	2025–26	La Liga	18	3	3	0	—		6	1	—		27	4
Real Betis	Total		47	5	6	1	—		21	9	—		74	15
San Diego FC	2026	Major League Soccer	9	4	—		—		—		—		9	4
Career total			408	158	46	21	5	2	66	25	2	0	527	206

=== International ===
As of match played 17 November 2026

Appearances and goals by national team and year
National team	Year	Apps	Goals
DR Congo	2015	4	0
DR Congo	2016	5	3
DR Congo	2017	7	4
DR Congo	2018	2	0
DR Congo	2019	11	6
DR Congo	2020	2	0
DR Congo	2021	7	0
DR Congo	2022	2	0
DR Congo	2023	6	3
DR Congo	2024	8	0
DR Congo	2025	11	5
DR Congo	2026	8	0
Total		73	21

Scores and results list DR Congo's goal tally first, score column indicates score after each Bakambu goal.

List of international goals scored by Cédric Bakambu
No.	Date	Venue	Opponent	Score	Result	Competition
1	26 March 2016	Stade des Martyrs, Kinshasa, DR Congo	Angola	1–0	2–1	2017 Africa Cup of Nations qualification
2	5 June 2016	Rabemananjara Stadium, Mahajanga, Madagascar	Madagascar	1–0	6–1	2017 Africa Cup of Nations qualification
3	5 June 2016	Rabemananjara Stadium, Mahajanga, Madagascar	Madagascar	5–0	6–1	2017 Africa Cup of Nations qualification
4	10 June 2017	Stade des Martyrs, Kinshasa, DR Congo	Congo	1–0	3–1	2019 Africa Cup of Nations qualification
5	10 June 2017	Stade des Martyrs, Kinshasa, DR Congo	Congo	2–1	3–1	2019 Africa Cup of Nations qualification
6	1 September 2017	Stade Olympique de Radès, Radès, Tunisia	Tunisia	1–1	1–2	2018 FIFA World Cup qualification
7	7 October 2017	Stade Mustapha Ben Jannet, Monastir, Tunisia	Libya	1–0	2–1	2018 FIFA World Cup qualification
8	24 March 2019	Stade des Martyrs, Kinshasa, DR Congo	Liberia	1–0	1–0	2019 Africa Cup of Nations qualification
9	30 June 2019	30 June Stadium, Cairo, Egypt	Zimbabwe	2–0	4–0	2019 Africa Cup of Nations
10	30 June 2019	30 June Stadium, Cairo, Egypt	Zimbabwe	3–0	4–0	2019 Africa Cup of Nations
11	7 July 2019	Alexandria Stadium, Alexandria, Egypt	Madagascar	1–1	2–2 (a.e.t.)	2019 Africa Cup of Nations
12	10 October 2019	Mustapha Tchaker Stadium, Blida, Algeria	Algeria	1–1	1–1	Friendly
13	18 November 2019	Independence Stadium, Bakau, Gambia	Gambia	1–0	2–2	2021 Africa Cup of Nations qualification
14	24 March 2023	Stade TP Mazembe, Lubumbashi, DR Congo	Mauritania	2–0	3–1	2023 Africa Cup of Nations qualification
15	28 March 2023	Stade Cheikha Ould Boïdiya, Nouakchott, Mauritania	Mauritania	1–0	1–1	2023 Africa Cup of Nations qualification
16	13 October 2023	Estadio Nueva Condomina, Murcia, Spain	New Zealand	1–0	1–1	Friendly
17	5 September 2025	Juba Stadium, Juba, South Sudan	South Sudan	1–0	4–1	2026 FIFA World Cup qualification
18	5 September 2025	Juba Stadium, Juba, South Sudan	South Sudan	2–0	4–1	2026 FIFA World Cup qualification
19	9 September 2025	Stade des Martyrs, Kinshasa, DR Congo	Senegal	1–0	2–3	2026 FIFA World Cup qualification
20	10 October 2025	Stade de Kégué, Lomé, Togo	Togo	1–0	1–0	2026 FIFA World Cup qualification
21	27 December 2025	Ibn Batouta Stadium, Tangier, Morocco	Senegal	1–0	1–1	2025 Africa Cup of Nations

== Honours ==
Bursaspor

- Turkish Cup runner-up: 2014–15

Beijing Guoan

- Chinese FA Cup: 2018

Real Betis

- UEFA Europa Conference League runner-up: 2024–25

France U19

- UEFA European Under-19 Championship: 2010

Individual

- UEFA European Under-19 Championship Team of the Tournament: 2010
- Turkish Cup Top scorer: 2014–15
- Facebook FA La Liga Best Breakthrough: 2016
- Villarreal Rookie of the Year: 2015–16
- UEFA Europa League Squad of the Season: 2015–16
- La Liga Player of the Month: October 2017
- Chinese Super League Top scorer: 2020
- Super League Greece Player of the Month: January 2023
- Super League Greece Top scorer: 2022–23
- Super League Greece Team of the Season: 2022–23

Records

- Beijing Guoan All-Time Top scorer
