= Mark Steinberg =

Golfing sports agent

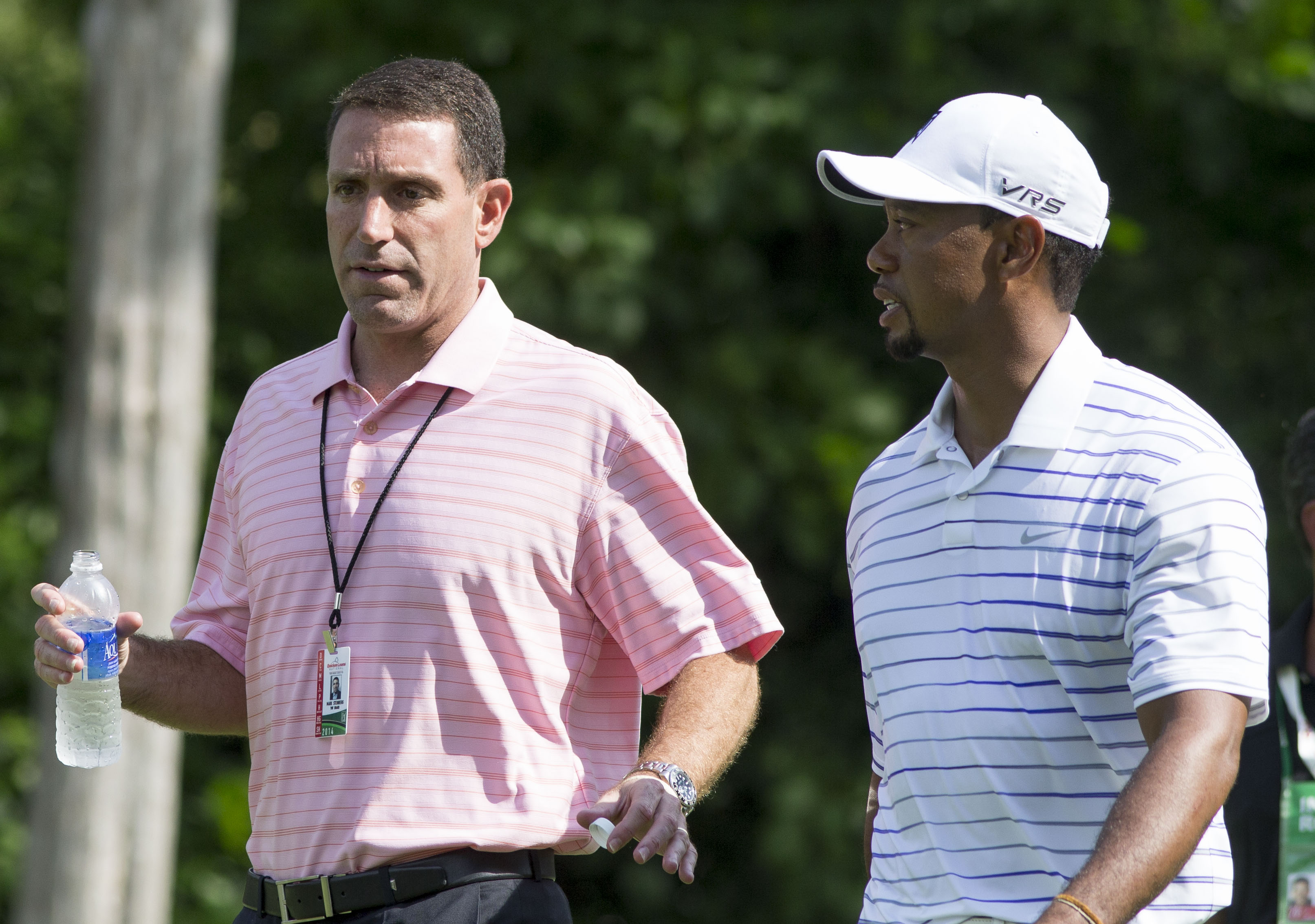
Steinberg with Tiger Woods in 2014.

Mark Steinberg is a sports agent who has been representing top golfers since 1992. He is a partner at Excel Sports Management. where he heads the professional golf division. Established in 2002, Excel Sports Management is a full-service sports management and marketing agency representing top athletes in professional basketball, baseball and golf. On June 6, 2011, Tiger Woods announced he would be going to Excel with Steinberg. Since that announcement, Steinberg has continued to build his division, including signing nine-time PGA Tour winner Matt Kuchar and Danielle Kang.

Previously, he led the global golf division of the large corporate sports agency IMG. While there, Steinberg shaped the careers of many golfers, including Tiger Woods, Steve Stricker and Annika Sörenstam. Steinberg has represented Tiger Woods since 1998. As the agent for Tiger Woods, Steinberg has been described as "the de facto chief executive of (Tiger's) golf and endorsement empire" and among the "three or four most powerful people in golf". Steinberg has described Mr. Woods as "one of my best friends". Steinberg parted with IMG in May 2011.

Steinberg sits on the following boards; Tiger Woods Foundation Board of Governors, Annika Sörenstam Foundation Board and Cleveland Sports Commission.

== Education and background ==
Steinberg is from Peoria, Illinois and attended the University of Illinois at Urbana-Champaign as an undergraduate where he was a member of the Zeta Beta Tau fraternity. He earned a spot on the Illinois basketball team as a walk-on and played for Illinois in the Final Four of the NCAA Men's Division I Basketball Championship in 1989. He attended law school at University of Illinois College of Law.

== Career history ==
While in law school Steinberg interned at IMG and he joined IMG as an employee in 1992. He started out working in team sports and golf. In 1993 he signed the popular golfers Michelle McGann and Karrie Webb. The following year, he recruited Annika Sörenstam to IMG. Sörenstam won the U.S. Women's Open in 1995 which lifted both Sörenstam and Steinberg into a new level of prominence. In 1998, Tiger Woods retained Steinberg as his agent, at that time Steinberg was just 30 years old.

== Activities as sports agent ==
As the sports agent for Tiger Woods, Steinberg is involved in many activities relating to his client including advising his client on managing his public image, his schedule and his finances. As his agent Steinberg had negotiated endorsement deals worth "hundreds of millions of dollars". In November, 2009, when Woods was involved in an early morning car accident at his home in Florida, Steinberg was involved in managing the media access to his client during the ensuing media frenzy.

== Legal issues ==
On June 2, 2012, Steinberg was stopped by police officers at a sobriety checkpoint on Saw Mill River Road at 10:43 p.m., in Ardsley, a suburb about 15 miles north of New York City. Officers administered a field sobriety check on him after smelling alcohol, according to Sgt. David Fisher of the Ardsley Police Department. Police said that Steinberg had a blood alcohol content of .19 percent, more than twice the legal limit in New York State. Steinberg was charged with DWI, as well as Aggravated DWI for blowing greater than .18 percent on the Breathalyzer test. He was booked and held for a couple of hours until he was released to a third party later that night. His license was eventually revoked as a result of the incident.
