= 2017 Kids' Choice Sports =

- Date: taped July 13, 2017 aired July 16, 2017
- Location: Pauley Pavilion
- Hosted by: Russell Wilson

Television/radio coverage
- Network: Nickelodeon
- Runtime: 90 minutes
- Produced by: Production company: Done and Dusted Nickelodeon Productions; Executive Producers: Jay Schmalholz Shelly Sumpter Gillyard Constance Schwartz Michael Strahan
- Directed by: Hamish Hamilton

The 4th Annual Kids' Choice Sports was held on July 13, 2017, at the Pauley Pavilion in Los Angeles, California, and was broadcast three days later on July 16. Seattle Seahawks quarterback and Super Bowl Champion Russell Wilson returned as host for the third straight year.

== Sports Council ==
A Kids' Choice Sports Council was formed to "lend their expertise and experience to help inform the awards show, consult on the nominee process and give feedback on categories." Committee members are:

- Baron Davis (former Hornets and two-time NBA All-Star)
- Ken Griffey Jr. (former baseball outfielder and 13-time All-Star)
- Lisa Leslie (former WNBA MVP and four-time Olympic gold medal winner)
- Cal Ripken Jr. (former shortstop and third baseman for the Baltimore Orioles and 19-time All-Star)
- Deion Sanders (NFL Pro Football Hall of Famer)
- Misty May-Treanor (three-time Olympic beach volleyball gold medalist)
- Andy Elkin (Agent, Creative Artists Agency)
- Tracy Perlman (VP Entertainment Marketing and Promotions, NFL)
- Jeff Schwartz (President and Founder, Excel Sports Management)
- Jill Smoller (SVP, William Morris Endeavor)
- Leah Wilcox (VP, Talent Relations, NBA)
- Alan Zucker (SVP, IMG Clients Group)
- Michael Phelps (most decorated Olympian of all time)
- Tony Hawk (professional skateboarder)
- Zane Stoddard (VP, Entertainment Marketing and Content Development, NASCAR)

== Host ==
- Russell Wilson

== Nominees ==
Winners are highlighted in bold

=== Best Male Athlete ===
- Cristiano Ronaldo (Soccer, Real Madrid C.F. La Liga)
- Dale Earnhardt Jr. (NASCAR)
- Kris Bryant (MLB, Chicago Cubs)
- LeBron James (NBA, Cleveland Cavaliers)
- **Stephen Curry (NBA, Golden State Warriors)**
- Tom Brady (NFL, New England Patriots)

=== Best Female Athlete ===
- Alex Morgan (soccer, NWSL, Olympique Lyonnais)
- Katie Ledecky (swimming)
- Mikaela Shiffrin (skiing, US Ski Team)
- Nneka Ogwumike (basketball, WNBA, Los Angeles Sparks)
- Serena Williams (tennis, WTA)
- **Simone Biles (artistic gymnastics)**

=== Favorite Newcomer ===
- Breanna Stewart (WNBA, Seattle Storm)
- Corey Seager (MLB, Los Angeles Dodgers)
- Dak Prescott (NFL, Dallas Cowboys)
- Dario Šarić (NBA, Philadelphia 76ers)
- **Laurie Hernandez (artistic gymnastics)**
- Simone Manuel (swimming)

=== Hands of Gold ===
- Adrián Beltré (MLB, Texas Rangers)
- Antonio Brown (NFL, Pittsburgh Steelers)
- Braden Holtby (NHL, Washington Capitals)
- Ian Kinsler (MLB, Detroit Tigers)
- Julian Edelman (NFL, New England Patriots)
- **Odell Beckham Jr. (NFL, New York Giants)**

=== Clutch Player of the Year ===
- Alex Morgan (NWSL, Olympique Lyonnais)
- Katie Ledecky (Competitive Swimmer)
- Mike Trout (MLB, Los Angeles Angels)
- **Russell Westbrook (NBA, Oklahoma City Thunder)**
- Sergio Garcia (Professional golfer)
- Sidney Crosby (NHL, Pittsburgh Penguins)
- Stephen Curry (NBA, Golden State Warriors)
- Tom Brady (NFL, New England Patriots)

=== Sickest Moves ===
- Carli Lloyd (NWSL, Manchester City)
- James Harden (NBA, Houston Rockets)
- **Kevin Durant (NBA, Golden State Warriors)**
- Kyrie Irving (NBA, Cleveland Cavaliers)
- Le'Veon Bell (NFL, Pittsburgh Steelers)
- Patrick Kane (NHL, Chicago Blackhawks)

=== Don't Try This at Home ===
- Alise Post (Professional BMX Racer)
- Connor Fields (Professional BMX Racer)
- Hailey Langland (Professional Snowboarder)
- **Keala Kennelly** (Professional Surfer)
- Lizzie Armanto (Professional Skateboarder)
- Mark McMorris (Professional Snowboarder)
- Nyjah Huston (Professional Skateboarder)

=== King of Swag ===
- Cam Newton (NFL, Carolina Panthers)
- Cristiano Ronaldo (Soccer, Real Madrid C.F.)
- DeAndre Jordan (NBA, Los Angeles Clippers)
- Rickie Fowler (Professional Golfer)
- **Russell Wilson (NFL, Seattle Seahawks)**
- Von Miller (NFL, Denver Broncos)

=== Queen of Swag ===
- Caroline Wozniacki (WTA)
- Danica Patrick (NASCAR)
- Lizzie Armanto (Professional Skateboarder)
- **Serena Williams (WTA)**
- Skylar Diggins (WNBA, Dallas Wings)
- Torah Bright (Professional Snowboarder)

=== Best Cannon ===
- Aaron Rodgers (NFL, Green Bay Packers)
- Andy Murray (Professional Tennis Player)
- Justin Verlander (MLB, Detroit Tigers)
- Matt Ryan (NFL, Atlanta Falcons)
- Max Scherzer (MLB, Washington Nationals)
- **Serena Williams (WTA)**

=== Biggest Powerhouse ===
- **Claressa Shields (Professional Boxer)**
- David Ortiz (MLB, Boston Red Sox)
- DeMarcus Cousins (NBA, New Orleans Pelicans)
- Mike Trout (MLB, Los Angeles Angels)
- Von Miller (NFL, Denver Broncos)

=== Need for Speed ===
- Allyson Felix (track & field)
- Dale Earnhardt Jr. (NASCAR)
- Danica Patrick (NASCAR)
- Jimmie Johnson (NASCAR)
- Katie Ledecky (swimming)
- Lewis Hamilton (Formula 1)
- **Usain Bolt (track & field)**

=== Legend Award ===
- **Michael Phelps**

=== #SEEHER Award ===
- **Simone Manuel**
