= Facebook Football Awards =

Logo created by Facebook for the awards.

The Facebook Football Awards is an awards which is only for the English Premier League. Which was announced in April 2015. In 2016, it was announced for various leagues around Europe. It is associated with Facebook, with La Liga awards associated with MARCA.

== Winners in 2015 ==
Awards were issued only to the Premier League in 2015.

=== Premier League ===
- Player of the Year: Alexis Sánchez
- Manager of the Year: Arsène Wenger

== Winners in 2016 ==
=== La Liga ===
- Player of the Year: Cristiano Ronaldo
- Best Striker: Cristiano Ronaldo
- Best Defender: Marcelo
- Best Midfielder: Luka Modrić
- Best Goalkeeper: Keylor Navas
- Best Breakthrough: Cedric Bakambu
- Best Goal: James Rodríguez
- Best Manager: Diego Simeone
- Best Supporters: The supporters of Real Madrid

=== Premier League ===
- Player of the Year: Riyad Mahrez
- Young Player of the Year: Anthony Martial
- Manager of the Year: Claudio Ranieri
- Team of the Year: Three Leicester City and three Tottenham Hotspur players was included in team of the year. Manchester United were also represented with two players, as well as one apiece from Arsenal, West Ham United and Manchester City

Team of the Year 2016

Position	Player	National team	Club
GK	David de Gea	Spain	(England) Manchester United
DF	Héctor Bellerín	Spain	(England) Arsenal
DF	Chris Smalling	England	(England) Manchester United
DF	Robert Huth	Germany	(England) Leicester City
DF	Toby Alderweireld	Belgium	(England) Tottenham Hotspur
MF	Riyad Mahrez	Algeria	(England) Leicester City
MF	Dele Alli	England	(England) Tottenham Hotspur
MF	Dimitri Payet	France	(England) West Ham
FW	Jamie Vardy	England	(England) Leicester City
FW	Harry Kane	England	(England) Tottenham Hotspur
FW	Agüero	Argentina	(England) Manchester City

=== Bundesliga ===
- Player of the Year: Pierre-Emerick Aubameyang
- New Comer of the Year: Julian Weigl
- Best Manager: Pep Guardiola
