= 2015 Kids' Choice Sports =

- Date: July 16, 2015
- Location: UCLA Pauley Pavilion, Westwood, Los Angeles
- Hosted by: Russell Wilson

Television/radio coverage
- Network: Nickelodeon
- Runtime: 90 minutes
- Produced by: Production company: Done and Dusted Nickelodeon Productions; Executive Producers: Jay Schmalholz Shelly Sumpter Gillyard Constance Schwartz Michael Strahan
- Directed by: Hamish Hamilton

The 2nd Annual Kids' Choice Sports was held on July 16, 2015, at the Pauley Pavilion in Los Angeles, California. Super Bowl Champion quarterback Russell Wilson of the Seattle Seahawks was the host of the show, which is meant to celebrate kids’ favorites in the sports world. On its original air date, the award show was preceded by a new episode of SpongeBob SquarePants and followed by the series premiere of Pig Goat Banana Cricket.

== Sports Council ==
A Kids' Choice Sports Council was formed to "lend their expertise and experience to help inform the awards show, consult on the nominee process and give feedback on categories." Committee members are:

- Baron Davis (former New York Knicks and two-time NBA All-Star)
- Ken Griffey Jr. (former baseball outfielder and 13-time All-Star)
- Lisa Leslie (former WNBA MVP and four-time Olympic gold medal winner)
- Cal Ripken Jr. (former shortstop and third baseman for the Baltimore Orioles and 19-time All-Star)
- Deion Sanders (NFL Pro Football Hall of Famer)
- Misty May-Treanor (three-time Olympic beach volleyball gold medalist)
- Andy Elkin (Agent, Creative Artists Agency)
- Tracy Perlman (VP Entertainment Marketing and Promotions, NFL)
- Jeff Schwartz (President and Founder, Excel Sports Management)
- Jill Smoller (SVP, William Morris Endeavor)
- Leah Wilcox (VP, Talent Relations, NBA)
- Alan Zucker (SVP, IMG Clients Group)
- Michael Phelps (most decorated Olympian of all time)
- Tony Hawk (professional skateboarder)
- Zane Stoddard (VP, Entertainment Marketing and Content Development, NASCAR)

=== Host ===
- Russell Wilson

=== Presenters and Guests ===
- U.S. Women's National Soccer Team
- Nick Cannon
- Mo'ne Davis
- Dude Perfect
- DeMarco Murray
- Gracie Gold
- Andre Drummond
- Lindsey Vonn
- Michael Strahan
- Carmelo Anthony
- Marshawn Lynch
- Candace Parker
- Ashley Wagner
- Erin Andrews
- Draymond Green
- Klay Thompson
- Abby Wambach
- Carli Lloyd
- Ciara
- Stephen Curry

== Legend Award ==
Former New York Yankees shortstop Derek Jeter was the recipient of the Legend Award. The award itself is similar to the signature orange blimp the other winners receive, with the difference being that this award is painted a golden color, then got hit with a metallic gold sliming, from a larger version of the Yankees logo.

== Winners and nominees ==
=== Best Male Athlete ===
- Stephen Curry (NBA, Golden State Warriors)
- LeBron James (NBA, Cleveland Cavaliers)
- Clayton Kershaw (MLB, Los Angeles Dodgers)
- Rory McIlroy (PGA Tour and PGA European)
- Lionel Messi (Spanish Club FC Barcelona and Argentina Men’s National Team)
- Aaron Rodgers (NFL, Green Bay Packers)
- Mike Trout (MLB, Los Angeles Angels)
- Russell Wilson (NFL, Seattle Seahawks)

=== Best Female Athlete ===
- Stacy Lewis (LPGA)
- Alex Morgan (USWNT and NWSL, Portland Thorns FC)
- Maya Moore (WNBA, Minnesota Lynx)
- Candace Parker (WNBA, Los Angeles Sparks)
- Danica Patrick (NASCAR)
- Maria Sharapova (WTA)
- Abby Wambach (USWNT)
- Serena Williams (WTA)

=== Favorite Newcomer ===
- José Abreu (MLB, Chicago White Sox)
- Odell Beckham Jr. (NFL, New York Giants)
- Malcolm Butler (NFL, New England Patriots)
- Joey Logano (NASCAR)
- Amy Purdy (Professional Snowboarder)
- Jordan Spieth (PGA)
- Mikaela Shiffrin (Professional Alpine Ski Racer)
- Andrew Wiggins (NBA, Minnesota Timberwolves)

=== Hands Of Gold ===
- Odell Beckham Jr. (NFL, New York Giants)
- Dez Bryant (NFL, Dallas Cowboys)
- Rob Gronkowski (NFL, New England Patriots)
- Henrik Lundqvist (NHL, New York Rangers)
- Andrew McCutchen (MLB, Pittsburgh Pirates)
- Carey Price (NHL, Montreal Canadiens)
- Pekka Rinne (NHL, Nashville Predators)
- Mike Trout (MLB, Los Angeles Angels)

=== Clutch Player of the Year ===
- Stephen Curry (NBA, Golden State Warriors)
- Rob Gronkowski (NFL, New England Patriots)
- DeMarco Murray (NFL, Philadelphia Eagles)
- Marshawn Lynch (NFL, Seattle Seahawks)
- Maya Moore (WNBA, Minnesota Lynx)
- Alexander Ovechkin (NHL, Washington Capitals)
- Cristiano Ronaldo (Real Madrid C.F. and the Portugal national team)
- Abby Wambach (USWNT)

=== Sickest Moves ===
- Sidney Crosby (NHL, Pittsburgh Penguins)
- Stephen Curry (NBA, Golden State Warriors)
- Novak Djokovic (ATP)
- Blake Griffin (NBA, Los Angeles Clippers)
- Gabriel Medina (Professional Surfer)
- Lionel Messi (FC Barcelona and Argentina national team)
- Ronda Rousey (UFC)
- Ashley Wagner (US Figure Skating)

=== Don't Try This At Home Award ===
- Danny Davis (Professional Snowboarder)
- Kelly Clark (Professional Snowboarder)
- Dale Earnhardt Jr. (NASCAR)
- Nyjah Huston (Professional Skateboarder)
- Travis Pastrana (Motorsports)
- Lindsey Vonn (Professional Alpine Ski Racer)

=== Most Enthusiastic Player ===
- Novak Djokovic (ATP)
- Gabby Douglas (USA Gymnastics)
- Rob Gronkowski (NFL, New England Patriots)
- Dwight Howard (NBA, Houston Rockets)
- Cam Newton (NFL, Carolina Panthers)
- Aaron Rodgers (NFL, Green Bay Packers)
- J. J. Watt (NFL, Houston Texans)
- Serena Williams (WTA)

=== King of Swag ===
- Carmelo Anthony (NBA, New York Knicks)
- Roger Federer (ATP)
- Rickie Fowler (PGA)
- LeBron James (NBA, Cleveland Cavaliers)
- Cam Newton (NFL, Carolina Panthers)
- Chris Paul (NBA, Los Angeles Clippers)
- Cristiano Ronaldo (Real Madrid C.F. and the Portugal national team)
- Russell Wilson (NFL, Seattle Seahawks)

=== Queen of Swag ===
- Skylar Diggins (WNBA, Tulsa Shock)
- Lolo Jones (USA Track and Field and Bobsled)
- Alex Morgan (USWNT and NWSL, Portland Thorns FC)
- Ronda Rousey (UFC)
- Maria Sharapova (WTA)
- Serena Williams (WTA)

=== Biggest Cannon ===
- Drew Brees (NFL, New Orleans Saints)
- Andrew Luck (NFL, Indianapolis Colts)
- Peyton Manning (NFL, Denver Broncos)
- Rafael Nadal (ATP)
- David Ortiz (MLB, Boston Red Sox)
- Mike Trout (MLB, Los Angeles Angels)
- Serena Williams (WTA)
- Russell Wilson (NFL, Seattle Seahawks)

=== Biggest Powerhouse ===
- Prince Fielder (MLB, Texas Rangers)
- Blake Griffin (NBA, Los Angeles Clippers)
- LeBron James (NBA, Cleveland Cavaliers)
- Marshawn Lynch (NFL, Seattle Seahawks)
- David Ortiz (MLB, Boston Red Sox)
- Ronda Rousey (UFC)
- J. J. Watt (NFL, Houston Texans)
- Serena Williams (WTA)
