= 2016 Kids' Choice Sports =

- Date: taped July 14, 2016 aired July 17, 2016
- Location: Pauley Pavilion
- Hosted by: Russell Wilson

Television/radio coverage
- Network: Nickelodeon
- Runtime: 90 minutes
- Produced by: Production company: Done and Dusted Nickelodeon Productions; Executive Producers: Jay Schmalholz Shelly Sumpter Gillyard Constance Schwartz Michael Strahan
- Directed by: Hamish Hamilton

The 3rd Annual Kids' Choice Sports was held on July 14, 2016, at the Pauley Pavilion in Los Angeles, California, and was broadcast three days later on July 17. Seattle Seahawks quarterback and Super Bowl Champion Russell Wilson returned as host.

== Sports Council ==
A Kids' Choice Sports Council was formed to "lend their expertise and experience to help inform the awards show, consult on the nominee process and give feedback on categories." Committee members are:

- Baron Davis (former Hornets and two-time NBA All-Star)
- Ken Griffey Jr. (former baseball outfielder and 13-time All-Star)
- Lisa Leslie (former WNBA MVP and four-time Olympic gold medal winner)
- Cal Ripken Jr. (former shortstop and third baseman for the Baltimore Orioles and 19-time All-Star)
- Deion Sanders (NFL Pro Football Hall of Famer)
- Misty May-Treanor (three-time Olympic beach volleyball gold medalist)
- Andy Elkin (Agent, Creative Artists Agency)
- Tracy Perlman (VP Entertainment Marketing and Promotions, NFL)
- Jeff Schwartz (President and Founder, Excel Sports Management)
- Jill Smoller (SVP, William Morris Endeavor)
- Leah Wilcox (VP, Talent Relations, NBA)
- Alan Zucker (SVP, IMG Clients Group)
- Michael Phelps (most decorated Olympian of all time)
- Tony Hawk (professional skateboarder)
- Zane Stoddard (VP, Entertainment Marketing and Content Development, NASCAR)

== Host ==
- Russell Wilson

== Presenters ==
- Michael Strahan
- Von Miller
- Cree Cicchino
- CC Sabathia
- Madisyn Shipman
- Nick Cannon
- Tyler Toffoli
- Kyrie Irving
- Tony Hawk
- Jagger Eaton
- Jamie Anderson
- Andre Drummond
- Victor Espinoza
- Emmanuel Sanders
- Nikki Bella
- Brie Bella
- Cam Newton
- Stephen Curry
- Klay Thompson
- Brandi Chastain
- Rob Gronkowski
- Ciara
- Zendaya

== Legend Award ==
Kobe Bryant received the 2016 Legend Award.

== Nominees ==
Winners are highlighted in bold

=== Best Male Athlete ===
- Kyle Busch (NASCAR)
- Stephen Curry (NBA, Golden State Warriors)
- Bryce Harper (MLB, Washington Nationals)
- **LeBron James (NBA, Cleveland Cavaliers)**
- Cam Newton (NFL, Carolina Panthers)
- Cristiano Ronaldo (Real Madrid C.F. and the Portugal national team)

=== Best Female Athlete ===
- Jamie Anderson (Professional snowboarder)
- Elena Delle Donne (WNBA, Chicago Sky)
- Lydia Ko (LPGA)
- Katie Ledecky (US Swimming)
- **Alex Morgan (USWNST and NWSL, Orlando Pride)**
- Serena Williams (WTA)

=== Favorite Newcomer ===
- **Simone Biles (Professional Artistic Gymnast)**
- Taylor Fritz (ATP)
- Todd Gurley (NFL, Los Angeles Rams)
- Jewell Loyd (WNBA, Seattle Storm)
- Karl-Anthony Towns (NBA, Minnesota Timberwolves)
- Kristaps Porziņģis (NBA, New York Knicks)

=== Hands of Gold ===
- **Odell Beckham Jr. (NFL, New York Giants)**
- Antonio Brown (NFL, Pittsburgh Steelers)
- Corey Crawford (NHL, Chicago Blackhawks)
- Rob Gronkowski (NFL, New England Patriots)
- Salvador Pérez (MLB, Kansas City Royals)
- Andrelton Simmons (MLB, Los Angeles Angels)

=== Clutch Player of the Year ===
- **Stephen Curry (NBA, Golden State Warriors)**
- Kevin Durant (NBA, Oklahoma City Thunder)
- James Harden (NBA, Houston Rockets)
- Patrick Kane (NHL, Chicago Blackhawks)
- Carli Lloyd (NWSL, Houston Dash)
- Peyton Manning (NFL, Denver Broncos)

=== Sickest Moves ===
- Odell Beckham Jr. (NFL, New York Giants)
- **Stephen Curry (NBA, Golden State Warriors)**
- Kyrie Irving (NBA, Cleveland Cavaliers)
- Lionel Messi (FC Barcelona and Argentina national team)
- Alex Ovechkin (NHL, Washington Capitals)
- Russell Westbrook, (NBA, Oklahoma City Thunder)

=== Don't Try This at Home ===
- Alise Post (Professional BMX Racer)
- Ashley Caldwell (Professional Aerial Skier)
- Danny Davis (Professional Snowboarder)
- Nyjah Huston (Skateboarder)
- Satoko Miyahara (Professional Figure Skater)
- **Ronda Rousey (UFC, MMA Fighter)**

=== King of Swag ===
- Antonio Brown (NFL, Pittsburgh Steelers)
- Andre Iguodala (NBA, Golden State Warriors)
- Von Miller (NFL, Denver Broncos)
- **Cam Newton (NFL, Carolina Panthers)**
- Cristiano Ronaldo (Soccer, Real Madrid C.F.)
- Russell Westbrook (NBA, Oklahoma City Thunder)

=== Queen of Swag ===
- **Leticia Bufoni (Professional Skateboarder)**
- Swin Cash (WNBA, New York Liberty)
- Misty Copeland (Ballet dancer)
- Elena Delle Donne (WNBA, Chicago Sky)
- Skylar Diggins (WNBA, Dallas Wings)
- Caroline Wozniacki (WTA)

=== Best Cannon ===
- Tom Brady (NFL, New England Patriots)
- Novak Djokovic (ATP)
- Bryce Harper (MLB, Washington Nationals)
- Aaron Rodgers, (NFL, Green Bay Packers)
- Serena Williams (WTA)
- **Russell Wilson (NFL, Seattle Seahawks)**

=== Biggest Powerhouse ===
- Prince Fielder (MLB, Texas Rangers)
- Draymond Green (NBA, Golden State Warriors)
- **Rob Gronkowski (NFL, New England Patriots)**
- Holly Holm (UFC)
- Von Miller (NFL, Denver Broncos)
- J. J. Watt (NFL, Houston Texans)

=== Need for Speed ===
- **Usain Bolt (Professional Track and Field Athlete)**
- Billy Hamilton (MLB, Cincinnati Reds)
- Candace Hill (Track and Field)
- Jimmie Johnson (NASCAR)
- Chloe Kim (Snowboarder)
- Ted Ligety (Alpine Ski Racer)
