= NBPA Players Awards =

NBPA Players' Awards
- Current: 2015 NBPA Players Awards
- Location: Paradise, Nevada
- First award: 19 July 2015
- Website: nbpa.com

The NBPA Players Awards was an American awards ceremony presented by the National Basketball Players Association (NBPA) honoring achievements in the National Basketball Association (NBA).

In an ongoing series of statements by various NBA players, a need was expressed for awards voted on by NBA players as a counterpoint to the "official" NBA awards, voted on by a panel of NBA print and broadcast media.

On 15 April 2015, Michele Roberts, the Executive Director of the NBPA issued a statement announcing "a peer recognition awards program ... at the request of the players. ... Our members want to recognize outstanding performance of their peers .... Later in that statement, Ms. Roberts pointed out that candidates were recommended in eight of ten categories with players having the option to write in a name in those eight categories. The vote for MVP was a write-in vote. Every active NBA player during the 2014-15 season voted privately by paper ballot which was sealed and submitted to the American Arbitration Association for tabulation before the end of the regular season.

On 27 April 2015, NBA beat writers began to learn the inaugural categories for the Players Awards. In a later press release, the NBPA outlined the rationale behind the "Players' Awards."

Due to an overwhelming response from its members, the NBPA decided to launch the 1st Annual Players' Awards ... in Las Vegas, NV in July .... In the time honored tradition of identifying excellence through peer review forged by institutions such as the Emmy Awards, The Grammy Awards and The Academy Awards, the Players' Awards are voted on by the NBA's active players.

== Award categories ==
- Most Valuable Player
- Best Rookie
- Man of the Year
- Best Defender
- Global Impact Player
- Hardest to Guard
- Clutch Performer
- Coach You Would Want to Play For
- Best Home Court Advantage
- Player You Secretly Wish Was on Your Team
- Most Influential Veteran

== Award presentation ==
In a pair of press releases dated 20 June 2015 and 9 July 2015 , the NBPA announced BET Networks would record the inaugural awards presentation on Sunday, 19 July and edit for broadcast on the BET and Centric networks on the following Tuesday, 21 July at 8pm in the Eastern time zone. Both networks are controlled by BET Networks. The venue selected for the awards presentation was the Penn & Teller Theatre at the Rio All Suite Hotel and Casino off the Las Vegas Strip in Paradise, Nevada.
