= 2015 NBPA Players Awards =

- Date: 19 July 2015
- Location: Rio All Suite Hotel and Casino; Paradise NV
- Hosted by: Jay Pharoah
- Acts: Lil Wayne; 2 Chainz; Jason Derulo; Fifth Harmony; Monica; Kid Ink; DJ Khaled; Gary Owen
- Website: nbpa.com

Television/radio coverage
- Network: BET Networks: BET; Centric
- Runtime: 2 hours, edited

The 2015 NBPA Players Awards was the inaugural presentation of the NBPA Players Awards. Organized and administered by the National Basketball Players Association, the awards presentation was presented on Sunday, 19 July 2015. It was recorded for broadcast by BET Networks and an edited presentation was broadcast on Tuesday, 21 July 2015 at 8pm in the Eastern time zone by the BET and Centric cable networks. Both networks were controlled by BET Networks.

In addition to a number of NBA players, several entertainers appeared on the broadcast including Lil Wayne, 2 Chainz, Jason Derulo, Fifth Harmony, Monica, Kid Ink, DJ Khaled and comedian Gary Owen. The awards presentation was hosted by comedian Jay Pharoah of Saturday Night Live.

== Methodology ==
On 15 April 2015, Michèle Roberts, the Executive Director of the NBPA issued a statement announcing the categories and methodology by which players would be voted upon. Ms. Roberts pointed out that candidates were recommended in eight of ten categories with players having the option to write in a name in those eight categories. The vote for MVP was a write-in vote. Every active NBA player during the 2014-15 season voted privately by paper ballot which was sealed and submitted to the American Arbitration Association for tabulation before the end of the regular season.

In subsequent press releases, "top vote getters" were listed alphabetically.

== Top Vote Getters and Winners ==
=== Best Rookie ===
- Jordan Clarkson, Los Angeles Lakers
- Zach LaVine, Minnesota Timberwolves
- Elfrid Payton, Orlando Magic
- **Andrew Wiggins, Minnesota Timberwolves**

=== Best Defender ===
- Tony Allen, Memphis Grizzlies
- Jimmy Butler, Chicago Bulls
- Anthony Davis, New Orleans Pelicans
- **DeAndre Jordan, Los Angeles Clippers**

=== Global Impact Player ===
- **Pau Gasol, Chicago Bulls**
- Kyrie Irving, Cleveland Cavaliers
- Dirk Nowitzki, Dallas Mavericks
- Tony Parker, San Antonio Spurs

=== Clutch Performer ===
- **Stephen Curry, Golden State Warriors**
- James Harden, Houston Rockets
- LeBron James, Cleveland Cavaliers
- Russell Westbrook, Oklahoma City Thunder

=== Coach You Most Want to Play For ===
- Mike Budenholzer, Atlanta Hawks
- Rick Carlisle, Dallas Mavericks
- Steve Kerr, Golden State Warriors
- **Gregg Popovich, San Antonio Spurs**

=== Hardest to Guard ===
- **Stephen Curry, Golden State Warriors**
- James Harden, Houston Rockets
- LeBron James, Cleveland Cavaliers
- Russell Westbrook, Oklahoma City Thunder

=== Best Home Court Advantage ===
- AT&T Center, San Antonio Spurs
- Chesapeake Energy Arena, Oklahoma City Thunder
- Moda Center, Portland Trail Blazers
- **Oracle Arena, Golden State Warriors**

=== Player You Secretly Wish was On Your Team ===
- Stephen Curry, Golden State Warriors
- Anthony Davis, New Orleans Pelicans
- Tim Duncan, San Antonio Spurs
- **LeBron James, Cleveland Cavaliers**

=== Most Valuable Player ===
- Stephen Curry, Golden State Warriors
- **James Harden, Houston Rockets**
- LeBron James, Cleveland Cavaliers
- Russell Westbrook, Oklahoma City Thunder

== Honorees ==
In addition to the awards voted upon, three additional honorees were announced during the awards broadcast.

Honor	Honoree
Oscar Robertson Visionary Award	Chris Paul, Los Angeles Clippers
Game Changer Award	Allen Iverson
Man of the Year Award	Ray Allen; Mr. Allen was addressed by President Barack Obama at part of the presentation of the award.
