= Jeff A. Schwartz =

American sports agent

Jeff Schwartz (born February 24, 1964) is CEO and founder of Excel Sports Management, an industry-leading sports agency representing top-tier talent, blue-chip brands and marquee properties. Schwartz oversees business operations for the agency and leads strategy for Excel's basketball division. As the top-ranked NBA agent in the industry for nearly a decade, Schwartz's clients include Nikola Jokić, Russell Westbrook, Kevin Love, Kristaps Porziņģis, Tyler Herro and Cade Cunningham among others.

== Background ==
Schwartz grew up in New Haven, Connecticut. He earned his B.A. at Miami University in Oxford, Ohio and Juris Doctor at Temple University Law School in Philadelphia. In 1990, Schwartz had a judicial clerkship for a federal bankruptcy judge in Los Angeles. He then joined Connecticut law firm Cummings & Lockwood as an associate in the commercial litigation department.

== Career as sports agent ==
Schwartz began his sports management career in 1992 at International Management Group (IMG) managing the careers of tennis greats Pete Sampras, Marcelo Ríos and Martina Hingis. In 2000, Schwartz was named the 15th Most Influential Person in Tennis by Tennis Magazine.

In 2002, Schwartz founded Excel Sports Management as a full-service basketball management and marketing business. To date, he has negotiated more than $8 billion in contracts and is consistently ranked as the top basketball agent in terms of contract revenue. Schwartz has forged millions of dollars in endorsement deals, including those with Nike, Under Armour, Adidas, 361°, Spalding, AT&T, KIA and Red Bull. In Forbes' most recent Most Powerful Sports Agent rankings (2022), Schwartz was the first in basketball and second among agents across all sports. He has appeared in the top-10 of the list all nine years it was published.

== Excel Sports Management ==
In 2011, Schwartz expanded Excel into a multi-sport agency with the addition of baseball and golf agents, Casey Close and Mark Steinberg. Close brought several clients to Excel, including Derek Jeter, and Steinberg brought long-time client Tiger Woods to the agency. The agency has since expanded into multiple other representation areas including football, media talent, women's sports, and coaches and executives, and continues to represent some of the most recognizable athletes in the world like Peyton Manning and Eli Manning. Excel also represents some of the biggest brands in sports and has secured naming rights and on-uniform partnerships with the leading properties within the NBA, MLS, MLB, NHL and NFL. Excel is a perennial finalist for Sports Business Journal's Best in Talent Management Award and has won three times, most recently in 2024. The agency also consistently appears in the top of Forbes' Most Powerful Sports Agencies rankings.

== Personal life ==
Schwartz serves on the Miami University Corporate Athletic Board.

He resides in Miami, Florida, with his wife and their daughters.
