= List of career achievements by Lionel Messi =

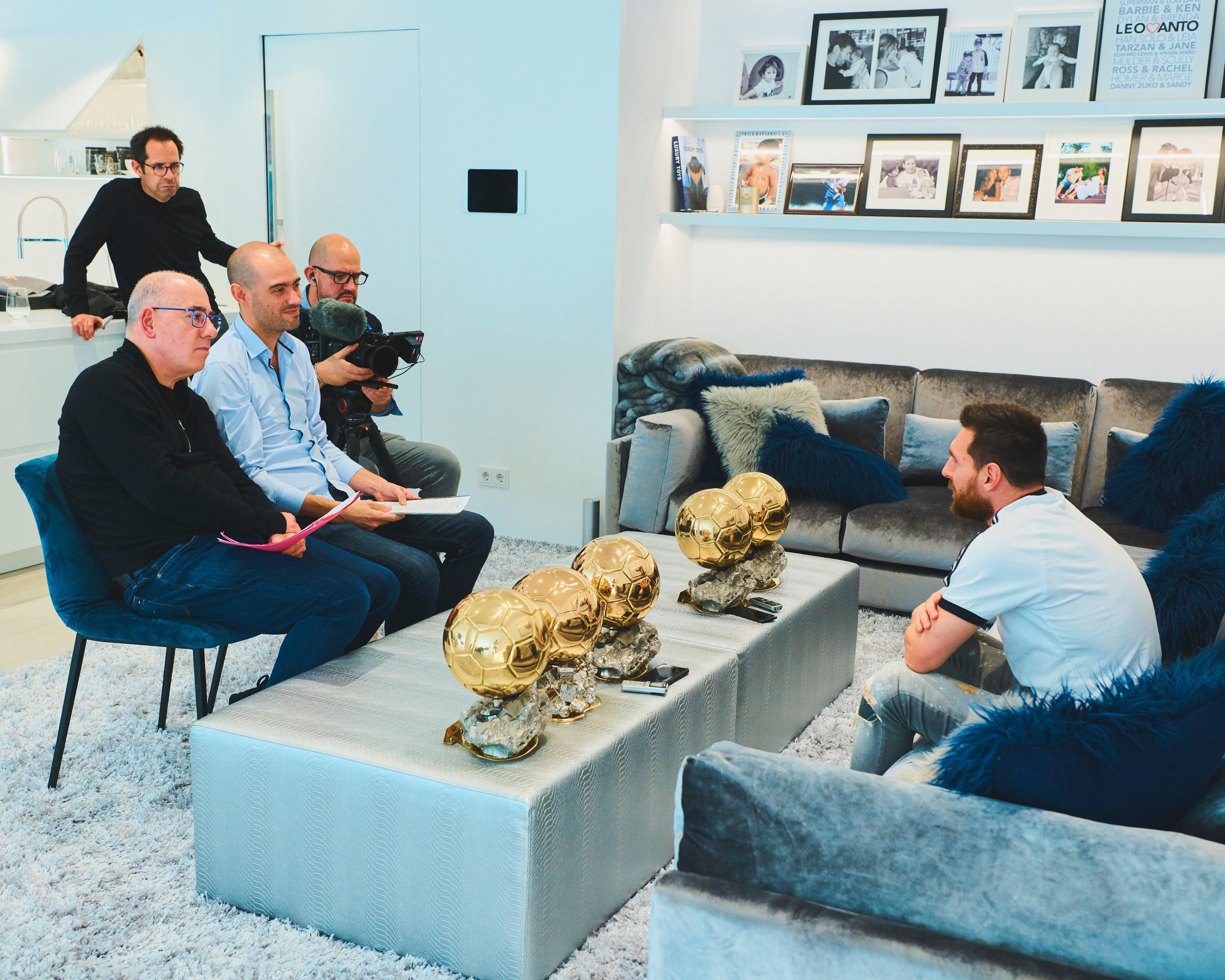
Messi during the presentation of the 2019 Ballon d'Or

Argentine footballer Lionel Messi, widely regarded as one of the greatest athletes of all time, and by many as the greatest footballer in history, has been awarded throughout his career a total of eight Ballon d'Or awards and three The Best FIFA Men's Player awards, the most of any player. He is also the only player to win the FIFA World Cup Golden Ball and FIFA Club World Cup Golden Ball twice. Messi holds the records for the most goals in European club competitions (704), Europe's Top Five Leagues (496), La Liga (474), Supercopa de España (14), UEFA Super Cup (3) and is also the first and only player in history to win five and six European Golden Shoes. He has scored 937 official goals for club and country, including 126 international goals, 21 goals at the FIFA World Cup, 129 goals in the UEFA Champions League, and 6 goals in the FIFA Club World Cup throughout his professional career, making him the second-highest all-time goalscorer in mentioned career and top level competitions. (Note: According to RSSSF, Pelé, with 1274 goals and Lajos Tichy, with 1917 goals hold the overall top-level goals and the overall goals record for club and country, respectively.) Messi is also the player with the most official recorded assists in football history (428), international football (67), FIFA World Cup (12), Copa América (18), La Liga (192), Copa del Rey (33) and Supercopa de España (5). Collectively, Messi has won 45 senior trophies (including the FIFA World Cup, Finalissima, Copa América, FIFA Club World Cup, UEFA Super Cup and UEFA Champions League) and 47 official trophies including youth-level honours (FIFA U-20 World Cup and Summer Olympics Gold Medal) in his career. (Note: According to FC Barcelona, FIFA, the Royal Spanish Football Federation, and multiple media outlets, Messi also won the 2005 Supercopa de España, bringing his Barcelona trophy total to 35. However, this particular trophy is not credited here since Messi was out of the matchday squad and did not feature in any of the two games against Real Betis. Similarly, Messi and Inter Miami were awarded a trophy for winning the Eastern Conference title during the 2025 MLS Cup playoffs. However, this trophy is not officially recognized by FIFA, so it is not credited here. For the aforementioned reasons, sources disagree on Messi's total number of accolades, ranging from 47 to 49 official career trophies, with his senior official trophy count ranging from 45 to 47.)

== Collective awards ==
=== Competitive trophies ===
==== Main trophies ====
Season / year	Competition	Club / national team	Ref.
2004–05	La Liga	Barcelona	
2005	South American U-20 Championship Third place	Argentina U20	
2005	FIFA U-20 World Cup	Argentina U20	
2005–06	La Liga	Barcelona	
2005–06	UEFA Champions League	Barcelona	
2006	Supercopa de España	Barcelona	
2006	UEFA Super Cup Runner-up	Barcelona	
2007	Copa América Runner-up	Argentina	
2008	Summer Olympics Gold Medal	Argentina Olympic	
2008–09	La Liga	Barcelona	
2008–09	Copa del Rey	Barcelona	
2008–09	UEFA Champions League	Barcelona	
2009	Supercopa de España	Barcelona	
2009	UEFA Super Cup	Barcelona	
2009	FIFA Club World Cup	Barcelona	
2009–10	La Liga	Barcelona	
2010	Supercopa de España	Barcelona	
2010–11	La Liga	Barcelona	
2010–11	Copa del Rey Runner-up	Barcelona	
2010–11	UEFA Champions League	Barcelona	
2011	Supercopa de España	Barcelona	
2011	UEFA Super Cup	Barcelona	
2011	FIFA Club World Cup	Barcelona	
2011–12	Copa del Rey	Barcelona	
2012	Supercopa de España Runner-up	Barcelona	
2012–13	La Liga	Barcelona	
2013	Supercopa de España	Barcelona	
2013–14	Copa del Rey Runner-up	Barcelona	
2014	FIFA World Cup Runner-up	Argentina	
2014–15	La Liga	Barcelona	
2014–15	Copa del Rey	Barcelona	
2014–15	UEFA Champions League	Barcelona	
2015	Supercopa de España Runner-up	Barcelona	
2015	Copa América Runner-up	Argentina	
2015	UEFA Super Cup	Barcelona	
2015	FIFA Club World Cup	Barcelona	
2015–16	La Liga	Barcelona	
2015–16	Copa del Rey	Barcelona	
2016	Supercopa de España	Barcelona	
2016	Copa América Runner-up	Argentina	
2016–17	Copa del Rey	Barcelona	
2017	Supercopa de España Runner-up	Barcelona	
2017–18	La Liga	Barcelona	
2017–18	Copa del Rey	Barcelona	
2018	Supercopa de España	Barcelona	
2018–19	La Liga	Barcelona	
2018–19	Copa del Rey Runner-up	Barcelona	
2019	Copa América Third place	Argentina	
2021	Supercopa de España Runner-up	Barcelona	
2020–21	Copa del Rey	Barcelona	
2021	Copa América	Argentina	
2021–22	Ligue 1	Paris Saint-Germain	
2022	Finalissima	Argentina	
2022	Trophée des Champions	Paris Saint-Germain	
2022	FIFA World Cup	Argentina	
2022–23	Ligue 1	Paris Saint-Germain	
2023	Leagues Cup	Inter Miami	
2023	U.S. Open Cup Runner-up	Inter Miami	
2024	Copa América	Argentina	
2024	Supporters' Shield	Inter Miami	
2025	Leagues Cup Runner-up	Inter Miami	
2025	MLS Cup	Inter Miami	
2026	FIFA World Cup Runner-up	Argentina	
2026	Campeones Cup	Inter Miami	

==== Other ====
===== Inter Miami =====
- Eastern Conference (MLS): 2025

=== Friendly trophies ===
==== International friendly ====
===== Argentina =====
- Copa Times of India: 2011
- Superclásico de las Américas: 2017, 2019
- Copa San Juan: 2019

==== Club friendly ====
===== Barcelona =====
- Joan Gamper Trophy: 2006, 2007, 2010, 2011, 2013, 2014, 2015, 2016, 2017, 2018, 2019, 2020
- Ramón de Carranza Trophy: 2005
- Franz Beckenbauer Cup: 2007
- Nelson Mandela Trophy: 2018
- Memorial Artemio Franchi: 2008
- Summer of Champions' Cup: 2012
- International Champions Cup: 2017 United States
- Tournoi de Paris: 2012
- Qatar Airways Cup: 2016
- Chang Champions Cup: 2013

===== Paris Saint-Germain =====
- Riyadh Season Cup: 2023

== Individual honours ==
=== Selections for the best football player ===
==== World ====
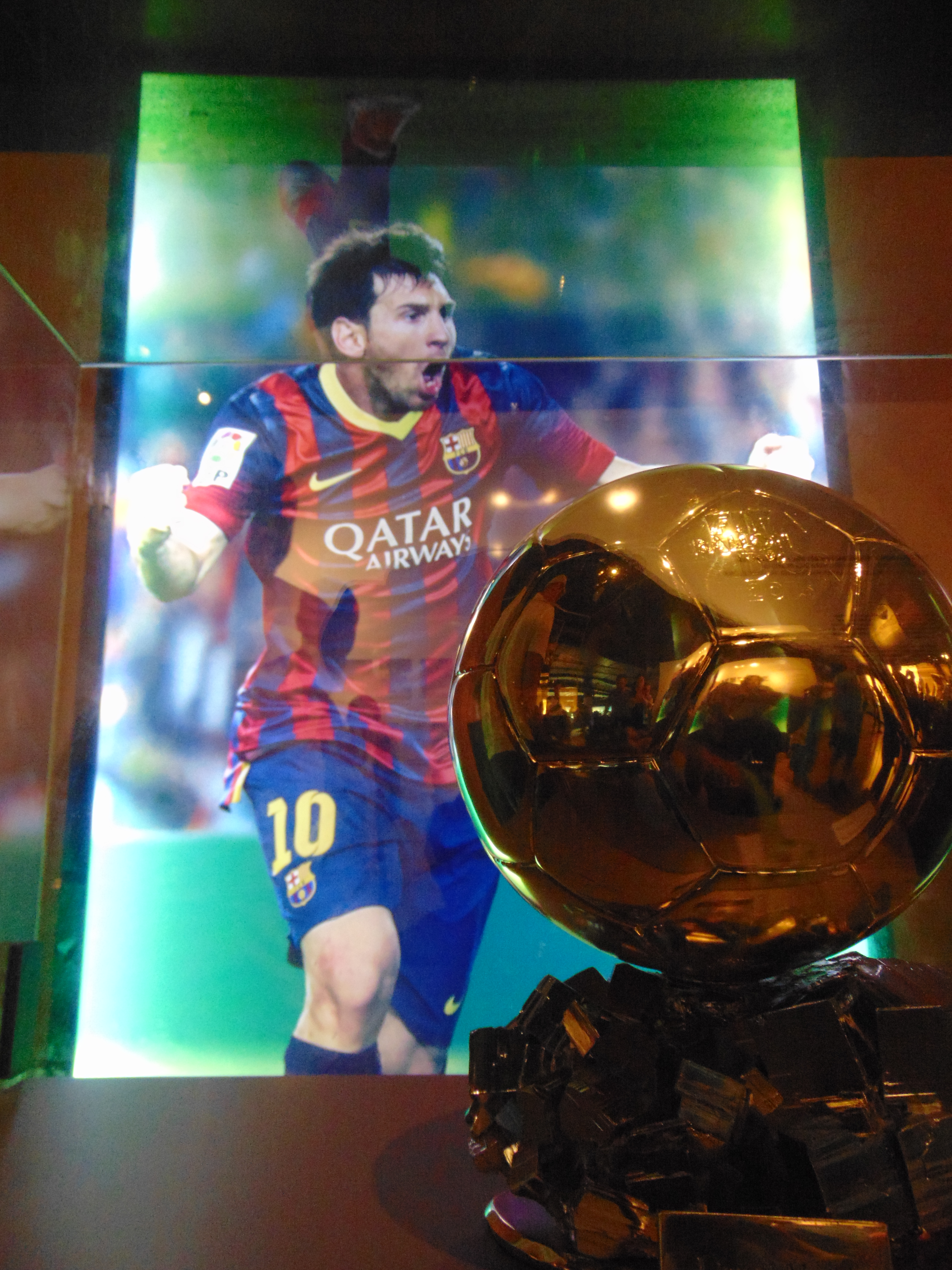
Messi, the player with the most Ballons d'Or in football history

Award ceremonies to crown the best player of the world have been organized annually since 1955, when the inaugural Ballon d'Or awarding took place. The Ballon d'Or was presented to the player who had been voted to have performed the best over the previous year, and was established by French journalist Gabriel Hanot. Originally, votes could only be awarded to European players before a rule change in 1995.

The FIFA World Player of the Year was established in 1991.

===== FIFA Ballon d'Or =====
Year	1st	2nd	3rd
2010	(Argentina) Lionel Messi (Barcelona)	(Spain) Andrés Iniesta (Barcelona)	(Spain) Xavi (Barcelona)
Percentage	22.65%	17.36%	16.48%
2011	(Argentina) Lionel Messi (Barcelona)	(Portugal) Cristiano Ronaldo (Real Madrid)	(Spain) Xavi (Barcelona)
Percentage	47.88%	21.61%	9.23%
2012	(Argentina) Lionel Messi (Barcelona)	(Portugal) Cristiano Ronaldo (Real Madrid)	(Spain) Andrés Iniesta (Barcelona)
Percentage	41.17%	23.68%	10.91%
2013	(Portugal) Cristiano Ronaldo (Real Madrid)	(Argentina) Lionel Messi (Barcelona)	(France) Franck Ribéry (Bayern Munich)
Percentage	27.99%	24.72%	23.36%
2014	(Portugal) Cristiano Ronaldo (Real Madrid)	(Argentina) Lionel Messi (Barcelona)	(Germany) Manuel Neuer (Bayern Munich)
Percentage	37.66%	15.76%	15.73%
2015	(Argentina) Lionel Messi (Barcelona)	(Portugal) Cristiano Ronaldo (Real Madrid)	(Brazil) Neymar (Barcelona)
Percentage	41.33%	27.76%	7.86%

===== Ballon d'Or =====
Year	1st	2nd	3rd
2007	(Brazil) Kaká (Milan)	(Portugal) Cristiano Ronaldo (Manchester United)	(Argentina) Lionel Messi (Barcelona)
Points	444	277	255
2008	(Portugal) Cristiano Ronaldo (Manchester United)	(Argentina) Lionel Messi (Barcelona)	(Spain) Fernando Torres (Liverpool)
Points	446	281	179
2009	(Argentina) Lionel Messi (Barcelona)	(Portugal) Cristiano Ronaldo (Manchester United/Real Madrid)	(Spain) Xavi (Barcelona)
Points	473	233	170
2016	(Portugal) Cristiano Ronaldo (Real Madrid)	(Argentina) Lionel Messi (Barcelona)	(France) Antoine Griezmann (Atlético Madrid)
Points	745	316	198
2017	(Portugal) Cristiano Ronaldo (Real Madrid)	(Argentina) Lionel Messi (Barcelona)	(Brazil) Neymar (Barcelona/Paris Saint-Germain)
Points	946	670	361
2019	(Argentina) Lionel Messi (Barcelona)	(Netherlands) Virgil van Dijk (Liverpool)	(Portugal) Cristiano Ronaldo (Juventus)
Points	686	679	476
2021	(Argentina) Lionel Messi (Barcelona/Paris Saint-Germain)	(Poland) Robert Lewandowski (Bayern Munich)	(Italy) Jorginho (Chelsea)
Points	613	580	460
2023	(Argentina) Lionel Messi (Paris Saint-Germain/Inter Miami)	(Norway) Erling Haaland (Manchester City)	(France) Kylian Mbappé (Paris Saint-Germain)
Points	462	357	270

- Nominated for Ballon d'Or: 2006, (Note: 20th place) 2018 (Note: 5th place), 2026

===== FIFA World Player of the Year =====
Year	1st	2nd	3rd
2007	(Brazil) Kaká (Milan)	(Argentina) Lionel Messi (Barcelona)	(Portugal) Cristiano Ronaldo (Manchester United)
Points	1047	504	426
2008	(Portugal) Cristiano Ronaldo (Manchester United)	(Argentina) Lionel Messi (Barcelona)	(Spain) Fernando Torres (Liverpool)
Points	935	678	203
2009	(Argentina) Lionel Messi (Barcelona)	(Portugal) Cristiano Ronaldo (Manchester United/Real Madrid)	(Spain) Xavi (Barcelona)
Points	1073	352	196

===== The Best FIFA Men's Player =====
Year	1st	2nd	3rd
2016	(Portugal) Cristiano Ronaldo (Real Madrid)	(Argentina) Lionel Messi (Barcelona)	(France) Antoine Griezmann (Atlético Madrid)
Percentage	34.54%	26.42%	7.53%
2017	(Portugal) Cristiano Ronaldo (Real Madrid)	(Argentina) Lionel Messi (Barcelona)	(Brazil) Neymar (Barcelona/Paris Saint-Germain)
Percentage	43.16%	19.25%	6.97%
2019	(Argentina) Lionel Messi (Barcelona)	(Netherlands) Virgil van Dijk (Liverpool)	(Portugal) Cristiano Ronaldo (Juventus)
Points	46	38	36
2020	(Poland) Robert Lewandowski (Bayern Munich)	(Portugal) Cristiano Ronaldo (Juventus)	(Argentina) Lionel Messi (Barcelona)
Points	52	38	35
2021	(Poland) Robert Lewandowski (Bayern Munich)	(Argentina) Lionel Messi (Barcelona/Paris Saint-Germain)	(Egypt) Mohamed Salah (Liverpool)
Points	48	44	39
2022	(Argentina) Lionel Messi (Paris Saint-Germain)	(France) Kylian Mbappé (Paris Saint-Germain)	(France) Karim Benzema (Real Madrid)
Points	52	44	34
2023	(Argentina) Lionel Messi (Paris Saint-Germain/Inter Miami)	(Norway) Erling Haaland (Manchester City)	(France) Kylian Mbappé (Paris Saint-Germain)
Points	48 (Note: As per the Rules of Allocation (art. 12), Lionel Messi (Argentina) won the Award on the basis of the votes cast by the men's national-team captains.)	48	35

- Nominated for The Best FIFA Men's Player: 2018, 2024 (Note: 6th place)

===== FIFA World Cup Golden Ball =====
Messi is the only player to date to have won the Golden Ball more than once.

Year	Golden Ball	Silver Ball	Bronze Ball	Ref(s)
2014	(Argentina) Lionel Messi	(Germany) Thomas Müller	(Netherlands) Arjen Robben	
2022	(Argentina) Lionel Messi	(France) Kylian Mbappé	(Croatia) Luka Modrić	
2026	(Spain) Rodri	(Argentina) Lionel Messi	(France) Kylian Mbappé	

===== FIFA Club World Cup Golden Ball =====
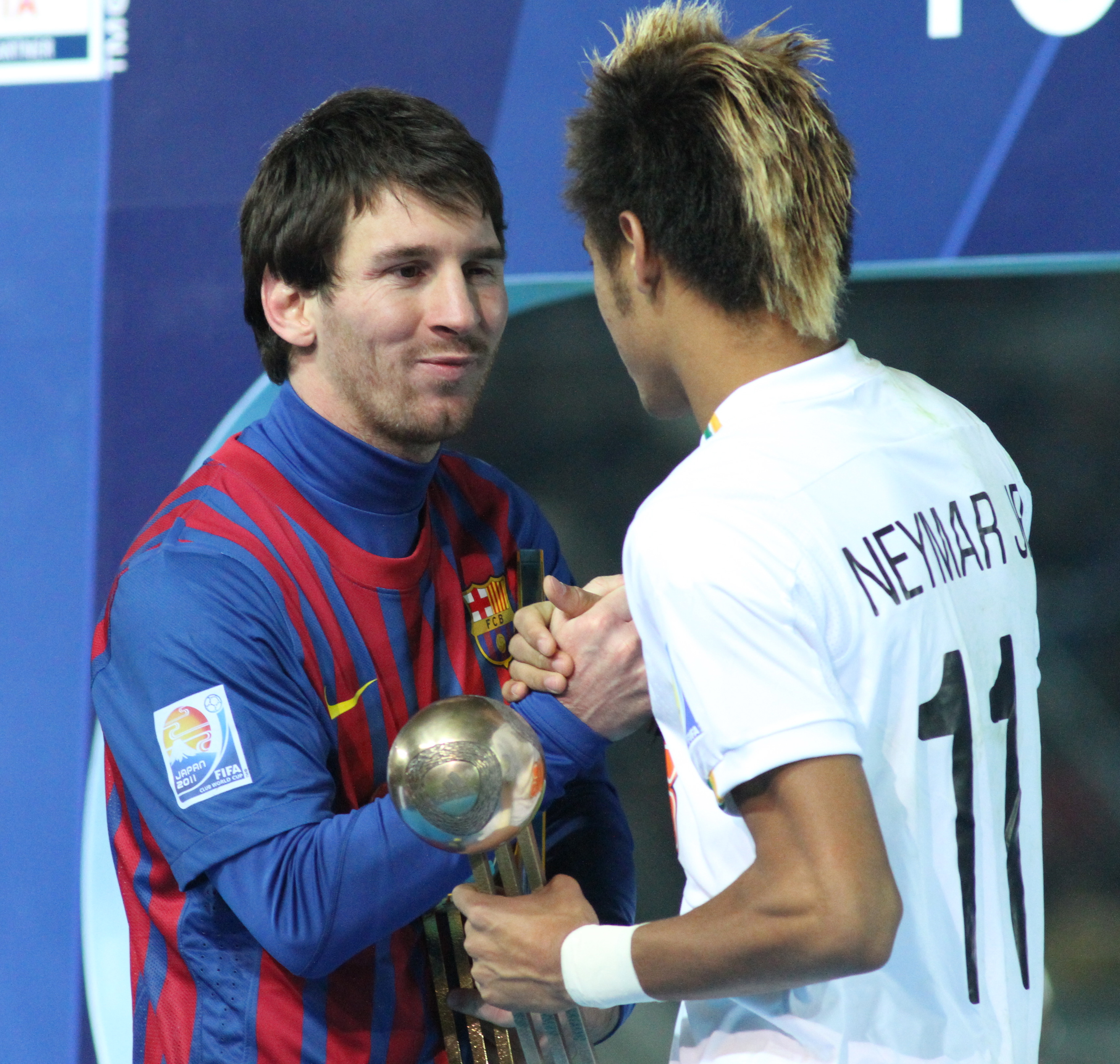
Messi accepting the Golden Ball award alongside future teammate Neymar after the 2011 FIFA Club World Cup final

Year	Golden Ball	Silver Ball	Bronze Ball	Ref(s)
2009	(Argentina) Lionel Messi	(Argentina) Juan Sebastián Verón	(Spain) Xavi	
2011	(Argentina) Lionel Messi	(Spain) Xavi	(Brazil) Neymar	
2015	(Uruguay) Luis Suárez	(Argentina) Lionel Messi	(Spain) Andrés Iniesta	

===== FIFA U-20 World Cup Golden Ball =====
Year	Golden Ball	Silver Ball	Bronze Ball	Ref(s)
2005	(Argentina) Lionel Messi	(Nigeria) John Obi Mikel	(Nigeria) Taye Taiwo	

===== Other =====
- MARCA America Award (Most decorated player in football history) by Marca: 2024
- The Ring Award (Best footballer of the year) by 433: 2021
- FIFPro Young Player of the Year Award: 2006, 2007, 2008
- Globe Soccer Best Player of the Year Award: 2015
- Goal Best Player of the Year Award: 2008–09, 2010–11, 2012–13, 2014–15, 2020–21, 2021–22, 2022–23
- Marca Best Player of the Year Award: 2017, 2018, 2019
- The Guardian Best Footballer of the Year: 2012, 2013, 2015, 2017, 2019, 2022
- FourFourTwo (FFT) Best Footballer of the Year: 2009, 2010, 2011, 2012, 2015, 2017, 2018, 2019
- ESPN Best Forward of the Year: 2014, 2015, 2016, 2017, 2018, 2019, 2020, 2021
- World Soccer Men's World Player of the Year: 2009, 2011, 2012, 2015, 2019, 2022
- World Soccer Young Player of the Year: 2006, 2007, 2008
- Kicker World Player of the Year: 2012, 2013, 2015, 2016, 2017, 2019, 2020
- ESPY Best Soccer Player of the Year: 2023, 2026
- ESPY Best International Men's Soccer Player of the Year: 2019
- Sofascore Best Player of the Year (The Absolute Statsman Award): 2018, 2019, 2020, 2021, 2022 (Note: Awarded to the player with the highest global average Sofascore statistical rating for the year.)
- Sofascore Veteran Award: 2023 (Note: Awarded to the player aged 35 and over with the highest global average Sofascore statistical rating for the year.)
- ΕΘΝΟΣΠΟΡ Best Footballer of the Year: 2009
- Dongqiudi (All Football) Player of the Year: 2019, 2021, 2022
- Nubia Magazine World's Best Player of the Year: 2021
- Best Player of the Decade (2010–2019) by Sporting News: 2019
- Best Club Player of the Decade (2010–2019) by Sports Illustrated: 2019
- Best Player of the Decade (2011–2021) by 90min: 2021
- Best Player of the 21st Century by The Independent: 2019
- Best Player of the 21st Century by FourFourTwo: 2022
- Best Player of the 21st Century by O Globo: 2023
- Best Player of the 21st Century by ESPN: 2024
- Best Player of the 21st Century by Talksport: 2024
- Best Player of the 21st Century by Goal: 2024
- Best Player of the 21st Century by Canal+: 2026
- Best Player of the last 25 years by FourFourTwo: 2020
- Best Player of the last 25 years by OneFootball: 2025
- Best Player of All Time by Voetbal International: 2017
- Best Player of All Time by SPORTbible: 2022
- Best Player of All Time by 90min: 2023
- Best Player of All Time by Radio Times: 2023
- Best Player of All Time by FourFourTwo: 2023
- Best Player of All Time by The Mirror: 2023
- Best Player of All Time by Marca: 2024
- Best Player of All Time by Sports Illustrated: 2024
- Best Player of All Time by BeSoccer: 2024
- Best Player of All Time by Daily Mail: 2024
- Best Player of All Time by The Athletic: 2025
- Best Player of All Time by Sports Mole: 2025
- Best Player of All Time by Sportsnaut: 2025
- Best Player of All Time by GiveMeSport: 2026
- Best Player of All Time by Bleacher Report: 2026
- Best Player of All Time by Daily Sabah: 2026
- Most Worthy Ballon d'Or winner of the 21st Century by Goal: 2024
- Most Successful Player in Ballon d'Or history by Sports Illustrated: 2026
- AIPS Best Player of the FIFA World Cup: 2026
- IFFHS Best Player of the FIFA World Cup: 2026 (Note: Based on the IFFHS overall performance index, first introduced in 2026.)
- IFFHS Best Playmaker of the FIFA World Cup: 2026
- IFFHS World's Best Player: 2022
- IFFHS World's Best Playmaker: 2015, 2016, 2017, 2019, 2022
- IFFHS World's Best Man Left Winger: 2017, 2018, 2019, 2020
- IFFHS World's Best Man Central Left Midfielder: 2021, 2022, 2023
- IFFHS World's Best Man Player of the Decade (2011–2020): 2021
- IFFHS World's Best Playmaker of the Decade (2011–2020): 2021
- IFFHS World's Best Man Player of All Time: 2025
- IFFHS World's Best Playmaker of All Time (2006–2022): 2023

- Listed in Goal 50 Best Players of the Year: 2007–08, (Note: 2nd place) 2009–10, 2011–12, (Note: 3rd place) 2013–14, 2015–16, (Note: 4th place) 2016–17, 2017–18, 2018–19, 2019–20
- Listed in Marca 100 Best Players of the Year: 2016, 2020, (Note: 10th place) 2022, (Note: 26th place) 2023, 2024, (Note: 24th place) 2025, (Note: 49th place) 2026
- Listed in The Guardian 100 Best Footballers of the Year: 2014, 2016, 2018, 2020, 2021, 2023, 2024, (Note: 27th place) 2025 (Note: 34th place)
- Listed in FFT 100 Best Footballers of the Year: 2008, 2013, 2014, 2016, 2020, 2021, 2022, 2023, 2024, (Note: 44th place) 2025 (Note: 50th place)
- Listed in ESPN FC 100 Best Forwards of the Year: 2023, 2024 (Note: 7th place)
- Listed in ESPN FC 100 Best Wingers of the Year: 2025, (Note: 8th place) 2026
- Listed in AFS 50 Top Players of All Time: 2017
- Shortlisted for FIFA World Cup Young Player Award: 2006
- Shortlisted for Golden Foot Award: 2016, 2017, 2018, 2019, 2020, 2021, 2024
- Shortlisted for Globe Soccer Best Player of the Year: 2016, 2017, 2019, 2020, 2021, 2023, 2024, 2026 (Note: The winner is to be announced.)
- Shortlisted for Globe Soccer Best Forward of the Year: 2026
- Shortlisted for Globe Soccer Player of 21st Century: 2020 (Note: Messi received 24 percent (%) of the votes cast, finishing second in the voting after Cristiano Ronaldo.)
- Shortlisted for World Soccer Men's World Player of the Year: 2007, 2008, 2010, 2013, 2014, 2016, 2017, 2018, 2020, 2021
- Shortlisted for World Soccer Young Player of the Year: 2005
- Shortlisted for World Soccer Player of the Decade (2000s): 2009 (Note: Messi received 759 points of the votes cast, finishing second in the voting after Ronaldinho.)
- Shortlisted for World Soccer Greatest Striker of All Time: 2013 (Note: Messi received 62.16 percent (%) of the votes cast, finishing second in the voting after Pelé.)
- Shortlisted for RSSSF Player of the Year : 2005 (Note: 14th place)
- Shortlisted for World Football Summit (WFS)/AS Player of the Year: 2020 (Note: Messi received 15 percent (%) of the AS.com readers vote cast, finishing second in the voting after Robert Lewandowski. The final ranking was determined by combining the fan vote (25%) with the jury vote (75%).)
- Shortlisted for IFFHS World's Best Player: 2021, 2023, 2026
- Shortlisted for IFFHS World's Best Playmaker: 2007, 2008, 2009, 2011, 2012, 2014, 2018, 2020, 2021, 2023, 2024, 2025, 2026

==== Europe ====
===== UEFA Men's Player of the Year Award =====
According to UEFA, the award "recognise[s] the best player, irrespective of his nationality, playing for a football club within the territory of a UEFA member association during the previous season." Players are judged by their performances in all competitions, domestic and international, and at club and national team levels throughout the season.

In the past, the award was solely decided by a panel of 53 leading sports journalists. In 2018, however, UEFA added 80 coaches, from the clubs that participated in the group stages of that year's UEFA Champions League and UEFA Europa League, to its jury. The amount of journalists selected by the European Sports Media association was also increased to 55, representing each of UEFA's member associations.

Season	1st	2nd	3rd
2010–11	(Argentina) Lionel Messi (Barcelona)	(Spain) Xavi (Barcelona)	(Portugal) Cristiano Ronaldo (Real Madrid)
Points	39	11	3
2011–12	(Spain) Andrés Iniesta (Barcelona)	(Argentina) Lionel Messi and (Portugal) Cristiano Ronaldo (Barcelona and Real Madrid, respectively)	
Points	19	17	
2012–13	(France) Franck Ribéry (Bayern Munich)	(Argentina) Lionel Messi (Barcelona)	(Portugal) Cristiano Ronaldo (Real Madrid)
Points	36	14	3
2014–15	(Argentina) Lionel Messi (Barcelona)	(Uruguay) Luis Suárez (Barcelona)	(Portugal) Cristiano Ronaldo (Real Madrid)
Points	49	3	2
2016–17	(Portugal) Cristiano Ronaldo (Real Madrid)	(Argentina) Lionel Messi (Barcelona)	(Italy) Gianluigi Buffon (Juventus)
Points	482	141	109
2018–19	(Netherlands) Virgil van Dijk (Liverpool)	(Argentina) Lionel Messi (Barcelona)	(Portugal) Cristiano Ronaldo (Juventus)
Points	305	207	74
2022–23	(Norway) Erling Haaland (Manchester City)	(Argentina) Lionel Messi (Paris Saint-Germain)	(Belgium) Kevin De Bruyne (Manchester City)
Points	352	227	225

- Nominated for UEFA Men's Player of the Year Award: 2013–14, 2015–16, 2017–18, 2019–20, 2020–21

===== Champions League Forward of the Season =====
Champions League positional awards were introduced in 2017 to "recognise the season's best player in each position in Europe's premier club competition".

Season	1st	2nd	3rd
2016–17	(Portugal) Cristiano Ronaldo (Real Madrid)	(Argentina) Lionel Messi (Barcelona)	(Argentina) Paulo Dybala (Juventus)
Points	359	147	64
2017–18	(Portugal) Cristiano Ronaldo (Real Madrid)	(Egypt) Mohamed Salah (Liverpool)	(Argentina) Lionel Messi (Barcelona)
Points	287	218	43
2018–19	(Argentina) Lionel Messi (Barcelona)	(Senegal) Sadio Mané (Liverpool)	(Portugal) Cristiano Ronaldo (Juventus)
Points	285	109	91

- Nominated for UEFA Champions League Forward of the Season: 2019–20, 2020–21

===== Other =====
- UEFA Club Footballer of the Year: 2008–09
- UEFA Club Forward of the Year: 2008–09
- Onze d'Or by Onze Mondial: 2009, 2010–11, 2011–12, 2017–18
- Onze d'Argent by Onze Mondial: 2008, 2016–17, 2018–19, 2020–21
- King of European Soccer by El País: 2009, 2010, 2011, 2012
- Golden Boy Award by Tuttosport: 2005
- Bravo Award by Guerin Sportivo: 2007
- European Player of the Season (Europe’s Top Five Leagues) by WhoScored: 2009–10, 2010-11, 2011-12, 2012-13, 2014-15, 2015-16, 2017-18, 2018-19, 2019-20, 2020-21, 2022-23 (Note: Awarded to the player with the highest average WhoScored rating (based on the data supplied by OPTA) across the European top five leagues.)
- UEFA Champions League Player of the Week: 2015–16/MD5, 2016–17/MD1-MD3-MD5, 2017–18/R16(2nd leg), 2018–19/MD1-MD2-MD5-MD10-MD11
- JOE's Champions League Man of the Week: 2014/45, 2014/48 2015/19

- Shortlisted for UEFA Club Forward of the Year: 2007–08, 2009–10
- Shortlisted for King of European Soccer by El País: 2007, 2008
- Shortlisted for Bravo Award by Guerin Sportivo: 2006
- Shortlisted for Golden Player Man Award by Tuttosport: 2021

==== Americas ====
- Copa América Best Player: 2015, 2021
- Copa América Best Young Player: 2007
- Leagues Cup Best Player: 2023
- CONMEBOL Baton of Football: 2023

===== Other =====
- Best South American Player of the 21st Century by Goal: 2024
- Best South American Player of All Time by FourFourTwo: 2023
- Best South American Player of All Time by Sports Illustrated: 2019
- IFFHS Best Player of CONMEBOL: 2020, 2021, 2022
- IFFHS Best Man CONMEBOL Player of the Decade (2011–2020): 2021

- Shortlisted for King of America by El País: 2024, 2025 (Note: Messi received 39 percent (%) of the total votes cast in 2025, finishing second in the voting after Giorgian de Arrascaeta.)

==== National ====
===== Spain =====
====== La Liga Awards ======
- La Liga Best Player/Most Valuable Player: (Note: La Liga officially started to reward the "best player" of the season since 2008-09 until 2015-16. Since 2016-17 La Liga introduced the “Most Valuable Player” award for the league campaign’s best footballer.) 2008–09, 2009–10, 2010–11, 2011–12, 2012–13, 2014–15, 2016–17, 2017–18, 2018–19
- La Liga Best Forward: 2008–09, 2009–10, 2010–11, 2011–12, 2012–13, 2014–15, 2015–16
- La Liga Player of the Month: January 2016, April 2017, April 2018, September 2018, March 2019, November 2019, February 2020, February 2021

====== Other ======
- Trofeo Alfredo Di Stéfano (Best Footballer of La Liga) by Marca: 2008–09, 2009–10, 2010–11, 2014–15, 2016–17, 2017–18, 2018–19
- Don Balón Award (Best Foreign Player in La Liga) by Don Balón: 2006–07, 2008–09, 2009–10
- Trofeo EFE (Best Ibero-American Player in Spanish football) by EFE: 2007, 2009, 2010, 2011, 2012
- Trofeo MVP La Liga by Mundo Deportivo: 2017–18, 2018–19, 2019–20
- Sofascore Player of the Season: (Note: The Sofascore rating was first introduced ahead of the 2015–16 season.) 2015–16, 2016–17, 2017–18, 2018–19, 2019–20, 2020–21
- Best La Liga Player of the Decade (2010s) by WhoScored: 2019
- Best La Liga Player of the Decade (2010s) by FourFourTwo: 2023
- Best La Liga Player of the 21st Century by Goal: 2024
- Best La Liga Player of All Time by CIHEFE: 2020

- Shortlisted for Trofeo Alfredo Di Stéfano: 2011–12, 2012–13, 2013–14
- Shortlisted for Don Balón Player of the Decade (2000s): 2010 (Note: Messi received 23.5 percent (%) of the total votes cast, finishing second in the voting after Zinedine Zidane.)

===== France =====
====== Ligue 1 Awards ======
- Ligue 1 Foreign Player of the Season: 2022–23
- Ligue 1 Player of the Month: September 2022

- Shortlisted for Ligue 1 Player of the Season: 2022–23

====== Other ======
- Sofascore Player of the Season: 2022–23

===== United States =====
====== MLS Awards ======
- MLS Most Valuable Player: 2024, 2025
- MLS Cup Most Valuable Player: 2025
- MLS Player of the Month: April 2024, October 2024, May 2025, July 2025, October 2025
- MLS Player of the Matchday: 2024/MD9-MD11-MD12-MD32-MD36-MD38, 2025/MD16-MD17-MD22-MD24-MD26-MD39, 2026/MD2-MD8-MD23

- Shortlisted for MLS Newcomer of the Year: 2023 (Note: Messi received 27.28 percent (%) of the total votes cast, finishing second in the voting after Giorgos Giakoumakis.)
- Shortlisted for MLS Most Valuable Player: 2023

====== Other ======
- Sofascore Player of the Season: 2025
- King of USA by El País: 2024, 2025

- Shortlisted for MLS Best Player of the 21st Century by Goal: 2025

===== Argentina =====
====== AFA awards ======
- Argentina Ballon d'Or success award by AFA: 2023
- Recognition Trophy (for Argentina FIFA World Cup championship victory) by AFA: 2023

====== Other ======
- Olimpia de Plata Argentine Footballer of the Year: 2005, 2007, 2008, 2009, 2010, 2011, 2012, 2013, 2015, 2016, 2017, 2019, 2020, 2021, 2022, 2023
- Consagración de Fútbol Exterior (Best Argentine Football Player Abroad) by Clarín: 2007, 2008, 2009, 2010, 2011, 2012, 2013, 2015
- Revelación del Año (Argentine Breakthrough Footballer of the Year) by Clarín: 2005
- Platinum Konex Award Argentine Footballer of the Decade (2000s and 2010s): 2010, 2020
- Best Argentina Player of All Time by FourFourTwo: 2023
- Best Argentina Player of All Time by Sports Illustrated: 2025

==== Club ====
===== Barcelona =====
====== FC Barcelona awards ======
- Trofeo Aldo Rovira: 2009–10, 2010–11, 2012–13, 2014–15, 2016–17, 2017–18
- Joan Gamper MVP Award: 2013, 2014, 2016, 2018
- Barça Players Award: 2015–16

====== Other ======
- Best Barcelona Player of the Decade (2010s) by WhoScored: 2019
- Best Barcelona Player of the 21st Century by Goal: 2024
- Best Barcelona Player of All Time by FourFourTwo: 2025
- Best Barcelona Player of All Time by Sports Illustrated: 2025

===== Inter Miami =====
====== Inter Miami CF awards ======
- Inter Miami Most Valuable Player of the Season: 2023, 2024, 2025

=== Goalscoring and assist providing ===
==== Top goal scorer ====
===== European Golden Shoe =====
The European Golden Shoe is awarded to the top goalscorer in Europe. It is awarded based on a weighted points system that allows players in tougher leagues to win even if they score fewer goals than a player in a weaker league. Goals scored in the top five leagues according to the UEFA coefficients rankings are multiplied by a factor of two, and goals scored in the leagues ranked six to 21 are multiplied by 1.5.

Since the points system was established in 1996, Messi is the only player to win the award a record six times and also the only one to win it with a record 100 points (season 2011–12). Messi was also the first player to win the award five times.

Season	Player	Club	Goals	Points
2009–10	(Argentina) Lionel Messi	(Spain) Barcelona	34	68
2011–12	(Argentina) Lionel Messi	(Spain) Barcelona	50	100
2012–13	(Argentina) Lionel Messi	(Spain) Barcelona	46	92
2016–17	(Argentina) Lionel Messi	(Spain) Barcelona	37	74
2017–18	(Argentina) Lionel Messi	(Spain) Barcelona	34	68
2018–19	(Argentina) Lionel Messi	(Spain) Barcelona	36	72

===== UEFA Champions League top scorer =====
Season	Player(s)	Club(s)	Goals
2008–09	(Argentina) Lionel Messi	(Spain) Barcelona	9
2009–10	(Argentina) Lionel Messi	(Spain) Barcelona	8
2010–11	(Argentina) Lionel Messi	(Spain) Barcelona	12
2011–12	(Argentina) Lionel Messi	(Spain) Barcelona	14
2014–15	(Brazil) Neymar	(Spain) Barcelona	10
2014–15	(Portugal) Cristiano Ronaldo	(Spain) Real Madrid	10
2014–15	(Argentina) Lionel Messi	(Spain) Barcelona	10
2018–19	(Argentina) Lionel Messi	(Spain) Barcelona	12

Source: Rec.Sport.Soccer Statistics Foundation, UEFA, WorldFootball.net

===== La Liga top scorer (Pichichi Trophy) =====
Season	Player	Club	Goals	Matches	Ratio
2009–10	(Argentina) Lionel Messi	(Spain) Barcelona	34	35	0.971
2011–12	(Argentina) Lionel Messi	(Spain) Barcelona	50	37	1.351
2012–13	(Argentina) Lionel Messi	(Spain) Barcelona	46	32	1.438
2016–17	(Argentina) Lionel Messi	(Spain) Barcelona	37	34	1.088
2017–18	(Argentina) Lionel Messi	(Spain) Barcelona	34	36	0.944
2018–19	(Argentina) Lionel Messi	(Spain) Barcelona	36	34	1.059
2019–20	(Argentina) Lionel Messi	(Spain) Barcelona	25	33	0.758
2020–21	(Argentina) Lionel Messi	(Spain) Barcelona	30	35	0.857

===== Major League Soccer top scorer (MLS Golden Boot) =====
Season	Player	Club	Goals	Matches	Ratio
2025	(Argentina) Lionel Messi	(United States) Inter Miami	29	28	1.036
2026	(Argentina) Lionel Messi	(United States) Inter Miami	26	31	0.839

Source: Major League Soccer

===== Other =====
Some of these accolades are shared with other players.

- FIFA World Cup Silver Boot: 2022, 2026 (Note: Messi also finished 2014 FIFA World Cup as the tournament's third-highest goalscorer with 4 goals and 1 assist, but Neymar with same stats (4 goals and 1 assist) received the Bronze Boot for playing fewer minutes than Messi.)
- FIFA World Cup qualification – CONMEBOL Top Goal Scorer: 2026
- FIFA Club World Cup Top Goal Scorer: 2011 (Note: Shared with Adriano.)
- FIFA U-20 World Cup Golden Boot: 2005
- Copa América Golden Boot: 2021 (Note: Shared with Luis Díaz.)
- Copa América Silver Boot: 2016
- Leagues Cup Top Goal Scorer: 2023
- Campeones Cup Top Goal Scorer: 2026 (Note: Shared with Casemiro.)
- UEFA Super Cup Top Goal Scorer: 2011, (Note: Shared with Cesc Fàbregas.) 2015
- Supercopa de España Top Goal Scorer: 2009, 2010, 2011, 2012, (Note: Shared with Cristiano Ronaldo.) 2020 (Note: Shared with eight other players.)
- Copa del Rey Top Goal Scorer: 2008–09, (Note: Shared with Luís Fabiano.) 2010–11, 2013–14, 2015–16, (Note: Shared with four other players.) 2016–17 (Note: Shared with Wissam Ben Yedder.)
- Joan Gamper Trophy Top Goal Scorer: 2011, 2015, (Note: Shared with Neymar and Ivan Rakitić.) 2016, 2017, (Note: Shared with four other players.) 2018 (Note: Shared with Malcom and Rafinha.)
- La Liga All Time Top Goal Scorer award by LFP: 2015
- La Liga All Time Top Goal Scorer award by Diario AS: 2019
- Argentina All Time Top Goal Scorer award by AFA: 2021, 2023
- IFFHS World's Best Top Goal Scorer: 2012, 2016
- IFFHS World's Best Top Division Goal Scorer: 2012, 2013, 2017, 2018 (Note: Shared with Jonas.)
- IFFHS World's Best International Goal Scorer: 2011, 2012, 2022
- IFFHS World's Best Top Division Goal Scorer of the Decade (2011–2020): 2021
- IFFHS All Time World's Best One Club Goal Scorer (672 goals for Barcelona): 2022
- IFFHS All Time Best Goalscorer in Big 5 European Leagues (496 goals: 474 goals in La Liga and 22 goals in Ligue 1): 2023
- IFFHS All Time Best Goalscorer in Europe (704 goals: 672 goals for Barcelona, 32 goals for Paris Saint-Germain): 2023

- Shortlisted for Gerd Müller Trophy: 2023

==== Best goal ====
- Copa América Best Goal: 2007
- UEFA Champions League Goal of the Season (chosen by UEFA Technical Observers): 2019–20
- UEFA/UEFA.com Goal of the Season (voted by fans): 2014–15, 2015–16, 2018–19, 2022–23
- Best Goal of the UEFA Champions League according to fans: 2018–19
- Best Goal in the semi-final stage of UEFA Champions League: 2018–19
- Best Goal in the quarter-final stage of UEFA Champions League: 2018–19
- Best Goal in the group stage of UEFA Champions League: 2022–23
- Best Goal in the quarter-final stage of CONCACAF Champions Cup: 2025
- Best Goal in the Leagues Cup final: 2023
- Best Goal in the semi-final stage of Leagues Cup: 2023, 2025
- MLS Goal of the Matchday: 2023/MD28, 2024/MD9-MD17-MD32-MD35-MD36, 2025/MD11-MD15-MD16-MD22-MD24-MD29-MD35, 2026/MD2-MD6-MD11-MD23-MD26-MD28-MD29
- Barça Best Goal Ever Award: 2019

- Nominated for FIFA Puskás Award: 2010, 2011, 2012, 2015, 2016, 2018, 2019
- Nominated for FIFA World Cup Goal of the Tournament Award: 2014, 2018, 2026
- Nominated for FIFA Club World Cup Goal of the Tournament Award: 2025
- Nominated for UEFA/UEFA.com Goal of the Season Award: 2021–22
- Nominated for CONCACAF Goal of the Year Award: 2024–25
- Nominated for La Liga Goal of the Season Award: 2013–14
- Nominated for Ligue 1 Goal of the Year Award: 2022–23
- Nominated for MLS Goal of the Year Award: 2025, (Note: Messi received 22.5 percent (%) of the total votes cast, finishing second in the voting after Son Heung-min.) 2026

==== Hat-tricks ====
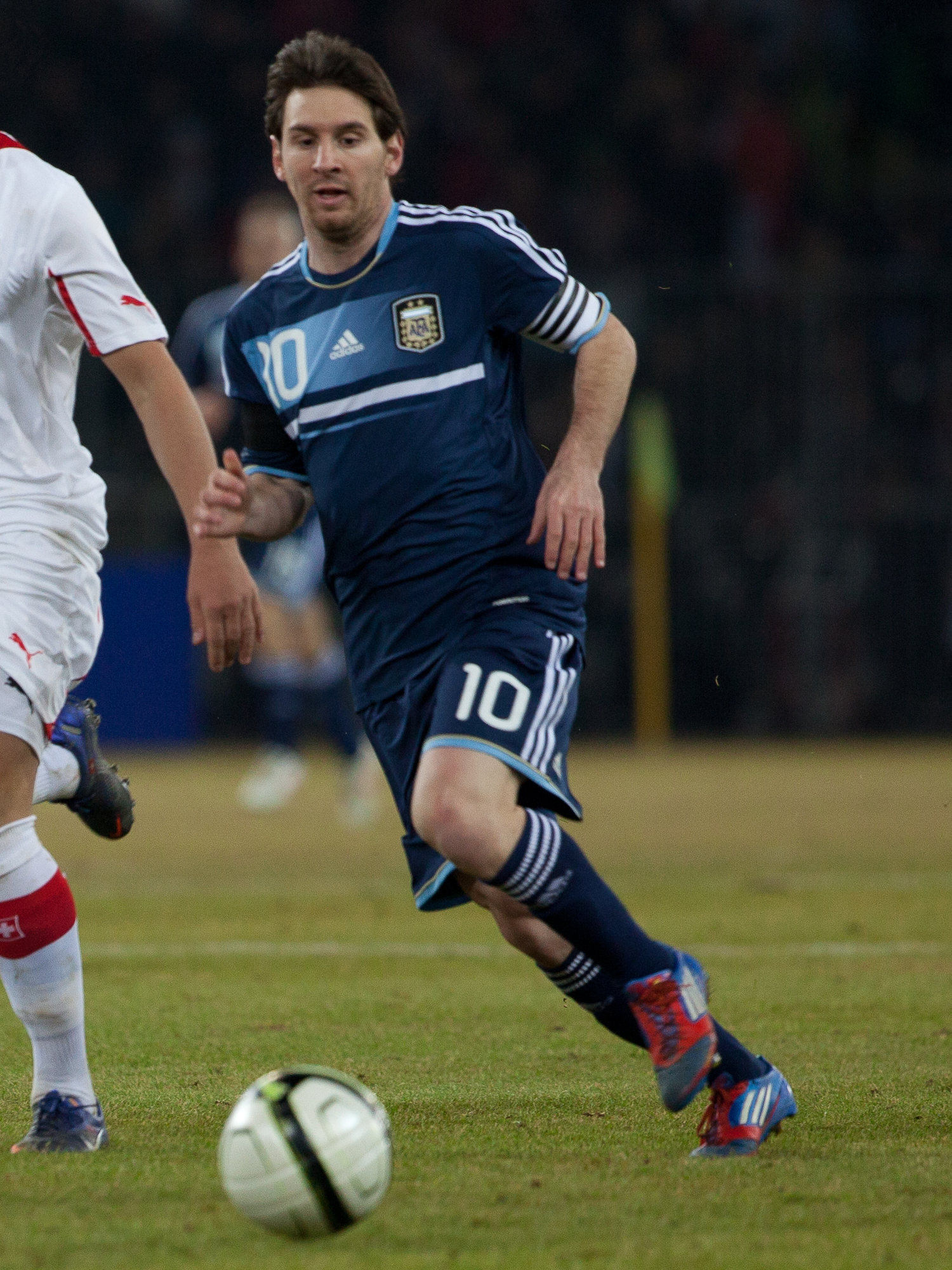
Messi scored his first international hat-trick against Switzerland in February 2012.

No.	For	Against	Result	Competition	Date
1	(Spain) Barcelona	(Spain) Real Madrid	3–3 (H)	2006–07 La Liga	10 March 2007
2	(Spain) Barcelona	(Spain) Atlético Madrid	3–1 (A)	2008–09 Copa del Rey	6 January 2009
3	(Spain) Barcelona	(Spain) Tenerife	5–0 (A)	2009–10 La Liga	10 January 2010
4	(Spain) Barcelona	(Spain) Valencia	3–0 (H)	2009–10 La Liga	14 March 2010
5	(Spain) Barcelona	(Spain) Zaragoza	4–2 (A)	2009–10 La Liga	21 March 2010
6	(Spain) Barcelona	(England) Arsenal^{4}	4–1 (H)	2009–10 UEFA Champions League	6 April 2010
7	(Spain) Barcelona	(Spain) Sevilla	4–0 (H)	2010 Supercopa de España	21 August 2010
8	(Spain) Barcelona	(Spain) Almería	8–0 (A)	2010–11 La Liga	20 November 2010
9	(Spain) Barcelona	(Spain) Real Betis	5–0 (H)	2010–11 Copa del Rey	12 January 2011
10	(Spain) Barcelona	(Spain) Atlético Madrid	3–0 (H)	2010–11 La Liga	5 February 2011
11	(Spain) Barcelona	(Spain) Osasuna	8–0 (H)	2011–12 La Liga	17 September 2011
12	(Spain) Barcelona	(Spain) Atlético Madrid	5–0 (H)	2011–12 La Liga	24 September 2011
13	(Spain) Barcelona	(Spain) Mallorca	5–0 (H)	2011–12 La Liga	29 October 2011
14	(Spain) Barcelona	(Czech Republic) Viktoria Plzeň	4–0 (A)	2011–12 UEFA Champions League	1 November 2011
15	(Spain) Barcelona	(Spain) Málaga	4–1 (A)	2011–12 La Liga	22 January 2012
16	(Spain) Barcelona	(Spain) Valencia^{4}	5–1 (H)	2011–12 La Liga	19 February 2012
17	Argentina	Switzerland	3–1 (A)	Friendly	29 February 2012
18	(Spain) Barcelona	(Germany) Bayer Leverkusen^{5}	7–1 (H)	2011–12 UEFA Champions League	7 March 2012
19	(Spain) Barcelona	(Spain) Espanyol^{4}	4–0 (H)	2011–12 La Liga	20 March 2012
20	(Spain) Barcelona	(Spain) Granada	5–3 (H)	2011–12 La Liga	2 May 2012
21	(Spain) Barcelona	(Spain) Málaga	4–1 (H)	2011–12 La Liga	5 May 2012
22	Argentina	Brazil	4–3 (N)	Friendly	9 June 2012
23	(Spain) Barcelona	(Spain) Deportivo La Coruña	5–4 (A)	2012–13 La Liga	20 October 2012
24	(Spain) Barcelona	(Spain) Osasuna^{4}	5–1 (H)	2012–13 La Liga	27 January 2013
25	Argentina	Guatemala	4–0 (A)	Friendly	14 June 2013
26	(Spain) Barcelona	(Spain) Valencia	3–2 (A)	2013–14 La Liga	1 September 2013
27	(Spain) Barcelona	(Netherlands) Ajax	4–0 (H)	2013–14 UEFA Champions League	18 September 2013
28	(Spain) Barcelona	(Spain) Osasuna	7–0 (H)	2013–14 La Liga	16 March 2014
29	(Spain) Barcelona	(Spain) Real Madrid	4–3 (A)	2013–14 La Liga	23 March 2014
30	(Spain) Barcelona	(Spain) Sevilla	5–1 (H)	2014–15 La Liga	22 November 2014
31	(Spain) Barcelona	(Cyprus) APOEL	4–0 (A)	2014–15 UEFA Champions League	25 November 2014
32	(Spain) Barcelona	(Spain) Espanyol	5–1 (H)	2014–15 La Liga	7 December 2014
33	(Spain) Barcelona	(Spain) Deportivo La Coruña	4–0 (A)	2014–15 La Liga	18 January 2015
34	(Spain) Barcelona	(Spain) Levante	5–0 (H)	2014–15 La Liga	15 February 2015
35	(Spain) Barcelona	(Spain) Rayo Vallecano	6–1 (H)	2014–15 La Liga	15 March 2015
36	(Spain) Barcelona	(Spain) Granada	4–0 (H)	2015–16 La Liga	9 January 2016
37	(Spain) Barcelona	(Spain) Valencia	7–0 (H)	2015–16 Copa del Rey	3 February 2016
38	(Spain) Barcelona	(Spain) Rayo Vallecano	5–1 (A)	2015–16 La Liga	3 March 2016
39	Argentina	Panama	5–0 (N)	Copa América Centenario	10 June 2016
40	(Spain) Barcelona	(Scotland) Celtic	7–0 (H)	2016–17 UEFA Champions League	13 September 2016
41	(Spain) Barcelona	(England) Manchester City	4–0 (H)	2016–17 UEFA Champions League	19 October 2016
42	(Spain) Barcelona	(Spain) Espanyol	5–0 (H)	2017–18 La Liga	9 September 2017
43	(Spain) Barcelona	(Spain) Eibar^{4}	6–1 (H)	2017–18 La Liga	19 September 2017
44	Argentina	Ecuador	3–1 (A)	2018 FIFA World Cup qualification	10 October 2017
45	(Spain) Barcelona	(Spain) Leganés	3–1 (H)	2017–18 La Liga	7 April 2018
46	(Spain) Barcelona	(Spain) Deportivo La Coruña	4–2 (A)	2017–18 La Liga	29 April 2018
47	Argentina	Haiti	4–0 (H)	Friendly	29 May 2018
48	(Spain) Barcelona	(Netherlands) PSV Eindhoven	4–0 (H)	2018–19 UEFA Champions League	18 September 2018
49	(Spain) Barcelona	(Spain) Levante	5–0 (A)	2018–19 La Liga	16 December 2018
50	(Spain) Barcelona	(Spain) Sevilla	4–2 (A)	2018–19 La Liga	23 February 2019
51	(Spain) Barcelona	(Spain) Real Betis	4–1 (A)	2018–19 La Liga	17 March 2019
52	(Spain) Barcelona	(Spain) Celta Vigo	4–1 (H)	2019–20 La Liga	9 November 2019
53	(Spain) Barcelona	(Spain) Mallorca	5–2 (H)	2019–20 La Liga	7 December 2019
54	(Spain) Barcelona	(Spain) Eibar^{4}	5–0 (H)	2019–20 La Liga	22 February 2020
55	Argentina	Bolivia	3–0 (H)	2022 FIFA World Cup qualification	9 September 2021
56	Argentina	Estonia^{5}	5–0 (N)	Friendly	5 June 2022
57	Argentina	Curaçao	7–0 (H)	Friendly	28 March 2023
58	Argentina	Bolivia	6–0 (H)	2026 FIFA World Cup qualification	15 October 2024
59	(United States) Inter Miami	(United States) New England Revolution	6–2 (H)	2024 MLS season	19 October 2024
60	(United States) Inter Miami	(United States) Nashville SC	5–2 (A)	2025 MLS season	18 October 2025
61	Argentina	Algeria	3–0 (N)	2026 FIFA World Cup	16 June 2026
62	(United States) Inter Miami	(United States) CF Montréal^{4}	7–1 (H)	2026 MLS season	29 August 2026

^{4} Scored 4 goals
^{5} Scored 5 goals

==== Top assist provider ====
- FIFA World Cup Top Assist Provider: 2018, (Note: Shared with fifteen other players.) 2022 (Note: Shared with four other players.)
- FIFA World Cup qualification – CONMEBOL Top Assist Provider: 2010, 2014
- FIFA Club World Cup Top Assist Provider: 2011
- Copa América Top Assist Provider: 2011, 2015, (Note: Shared with Jorge Valdivia.) 2016, 2021
- Finalissima Top Assist Provider: 2022
- Campeones Cup Top Assist Provider: 2026 (Note: Shared with Luis Suárez.)
- UEFA Super Cup Top Assist Provider: 2009, 2011
- UEFA Champions League Top Assist Provider: 2011–12, (Note: Shared with four other players.) 2014–15
- Supercopa de España Top Assist Provider: 2011, (Note: Shared with Karim Benzema and Pepe.) 2016, 2018 (Note: Shared with Luis Muriel.)
- La Liga Top Assist Provider: 2010–11, 2014–15, 2015–16, (Note: Shared with Luis Suárez.) 2017–18, (Note: Shared with Pablo Fornals and Luis Suárez.) 2018–19, 2019–20
- Copa del Rey Top Assist Provider: 2011–12, (Note: Shared with Pablo Hernández.) 2013–14, (Note: Shared with Chory Castro.) 2014–15, 2015–16, 2016–17, 2017–18
- Ligue 1 Top Assist Provider: 2022–23
- Major League Soccer Top Assist Provider: 2025 (Note: Shared with Anders Dreyer.)
- MLS Cup Top Assist Provider: 2025

=== Inclusions in best team/dream team/best XI ===
==== International ====
===== Awarded by International Football Federations =====
- FIFPRO World 11: 2007, 2008, 2009, 2010, 2011, 2012, 2013, 2014, 2015, 2016, 2017, 2018, 2019, 2020, 2021, 2022, 2023, 2026
- FIFA World Cup Dream Team: 2014, 2022, 2026
- Copa América Team of the Tournament: 2007, 2011, 2015, 2016, 2021, 2024
- UEFA Ultimate Team of the Year
- UEFA Team of the Year: 2008, 2009, 2010, 2011, 2012, 2014, 2015, 2016, 2017, 2018, 2019, 2020
- UEFA Champions League Squad of the Season: 2014–15, 2015–16, 2016–17, 2017–18, 2018–19, 2019–20, 2020–21
- UEFA Champions League Player Rater Team of the Season: 2009–10, 2010–11, 2011–12
- UEFA Champions League Player Rater Team of the Week: 2010–11/MD1, 2010–11/MD8A, 2010–11/MD10, 2010–11/MD11, 2010–11/MD12
- CONCACAF Champions Cup Team of the Week: 2024/R16, 2025/R1, 2025/QF

===== Other =====
- Ballon d'Or Dream Team (First Team): 2020
- Diario AS 11 LeyendAS: 2021
- World Soccer Greatest XI of all time: 2013
- France Football Team of the Decade (2010–2019): 2019
- Sports Illustrated Team of the Decade (2000s and 2010s): 2009, 2019 (Note: Includes Best club XI and Best international XI.)
- The Sun Team of the Decade (2000s): 2009
- ESPN World Team of the Decade (2000s): 2010
- Goal World Team of the Decade (2010s): 2019
- France Football World XI of the Year: 2015
- L'Équipe Team of the Year: 2008, 2009, 2010, 2011, 2012, 2013, 2014, 2016, 2017, 2018, 2022
- FIFA/EA Sports FC Team of the Year (TOTY Award): 2008, 2009, 2010, 2011, 2012, 2013, 2014, 2015, 2016, 2017, 2018, 2019, 2020, (Note: As the 12th player.) 2021, 2022, 2023
- ESM Team of the Season: 2005–06, 2007–08, 2008–09, 2009–10, 2010–11, 2011–12, 2012–13, 2014–15, 2015–16, 2016–17, 2017–18, 2018–19, 2019–20, 2020–21, 2022–23
- El País South American Team of the Year: 2025
- IFFHS Men's World Team: 2017, 2018, 2019, 2020, 2021, 2022, 2023
- IFFHS Team of the FIFA World Cup: 2026 (Note: First introduced in 2026.)
- IFFHS Men's CONMEBOL Team: 2020, 2021, 2022, 2023, 2024, 2025
- IFFHS Team of the Copa América: 2021, 2024
- IFFHS Men's World Team of the Decade (2011–2020): 2021
- IFFHS Men's CONMEBOL Team of the Decade (2011–2020): 2021
- IFFHS All-time World Men's Dream Team: 2021
- IFFHS All-time South America Men's Dream Team: 2021

==== National ====
===== Spain =====
====== La Liga Awards ======
- La Liga Team of the Season: 2014–15, 2015–16

====== Other ======
- UEFA La Liga Team of the Season: 2014–15, 2015–16, 2016–17, 2019–20
- The Athletic La Liga Team of the Season: 2019-20
- Don Balón La Liga Team of the Decade (2000s): 2010

===== France =====
====== Ligue1 Awards ======
- Ligue 1 Team of the Year: 2022–23

===== United States =====
====== MLS Awards ======
- MLS Best XI: 2024 2025
- MLS All-Star: 2024, 2025, 2026

===== Argentina =====
====== AFA Awards ======
- Argentina Team of All Time by AFA: 2019

====== Other ======
- IFFHS All-time Argentina Men's Dream Team: 2021
- Goal Ultimate Argentina Dream Team: 2022

==== Club ====
===== Barcelona =====
- Marca All-time Barcelona Best XI: 2017
- Goal Ultimate Barcelona Dream Team: 2022
- ESPN Barcelona Men's All-time XI: 2024

=== Man of the match awards ===
==== International Competitions ====
===== FIFA World Cup =====
Edition	Player	For	Against	Rank
2010 South Africa	(Argentina) Lionel Messi	Argentina	Greece (GS)	14
2014 Brazil	(Argentina) Lionel Messi	Argentina	Bosnia and Herzegovina (GS), Iran (GS), Nigeria (GS), Switzerland (R16)	1
2018 Russia	(Argentina) Lionel Messi	Argentina	Nigeria (GS)	9
2022 Qatar	(Argentina) Lionel Messi	Argentina	Mexico (GS), Australia (R16), Netherlands (QF), Croatia (SF), France (F)	1
2026 Canada Mexico United States	(Argentina) Lionel Messi	Argentina	Algeria (GS), Austria (GS), Cape Verde (R32), Egypt (R16), England (SF)	1

===== Finalissima =====
Edition	Player	For	Against	Rank
(England) 2022 London	(Argentina) Lionel Messi	Argentina	Italy (F)	1

===== Copa América =====
Edition	Player	For	Against	Rank
2011 Argentina	(Argentina) Lionel Messi	Argentina	Bolivia (GS), Costa Rica (GS)	1
2015 Chile	(Argentina) Lionel Messi	Argentina	Paraguay (GS), Uruguay (GS), Colombia (QF), Paraguay (SF)	1
2016 United States	(Argentina) Lionel Messi	Argentina	Panama (GS), Venezuela (QF), United States (SF)	1
2019 Brazil	(Argentina) Lionel Messi	Argentina	Qatar (GS)	8
2021 Brazil	(Argentina) Lionel Messi	Argentina	Chile (GS), Uruguay (GS), Bolivia (GS), Ecuador (QF)	1
2024 United States	(Argentina) Lionel Messi	Argentina	Canada (SF)	7

===== FIFA Club World Cup Final =====
Edition	Player	For	Against	Ref(s)
(United Arab Emirates) 2009 UAE	(Argentina) Lionel Messi	(Spain) Barcelona	(Argentina) Estudiantes (LP)	
2011 Japan	(Argentina) Lionel Messi	(Spain) Barcelona	(Brazil) Santos	

===== UEFA Super Cup =====
Edition	Player	For	Against	Ref(s)
2009 Monaco	(Argentina) Lionel Messi	(Spain) Barcelona	(Ukraine) Shakhtar Donetsk	
(Georgia (country)) 2015 Tbilisi	(Argentina) Lionel Messi	(Spain) Barcelona	(Spain) Sevilla	

===== UEFA Champions League Final =====
Edition	Player(s)	For	Against	Ref(s)
(Italy) 2009 Rome (Note: In 2009 UEFA awarded two man of the match awards. Xavi was named as UEFA's Man of the Match, whereas Messi received Fan's Man of the Match award.)	(Argentina) Lionel Messi	(Spain) Barcelona	(England) Manchester United	
(Italy) 2009 Rome	(Spain) Xavi	(Spain) Barcelona	(England) Manchester United	
(England) 2011 London (Note: In 2011 UEFA awarded two Man of the Match awards. Messi was named as UEFA's and Fan's Man of the Match.)	(Argentina) Lionel Messi	(Spain) Barcelona	(England) Manchester United	
(England) 2011 London	(Argentina) Lionel Messi	(Spain) Barcelona	(England) Manchester United	

===== Campeones Cup (North America) =====
Edition	Player	For	Against	Ref(s)
2026	(Argentina) Lionel Messi	(United States) Inter Miami	(Mexico) Cruz Azul	

==== National competitions ====
===== Copa del Rey Final (Spain) =====
Edition	Player	For	Against	Ref(s)
2015	(Argentina) Lionel Messi	(Spain) Barcelona	(Spain) Athletic Bilbao	
2017	(Argentina) Lionel Messi	(Spain) Barcelona	(Spain) Alavés	
2021	(Argentina) Lionel Messi	(Spain) Barcelona	(Spain) Athletic Bilbao	

===== Trophée des Champions (France) =====
Edition	Player	For	Against	Ref(s)
2022	(Argentina) Lionel Messi	(France) Paris Saint-Germain	(France) Nantes	

===== MLS Cup Final (United States) =====
Edition	Player	For	Against	Ref(s)
2025	(Argentina) Lionel Messi	(United States) Inter Miami	(Canada) Vancouver Whitecaps	

=== Selections for sports personality ===
==== International ====
===== Laureus World Sports Award for Sportsman of the Year =====
The Laureus World Sports Awards is an annual award ceremony honouring remarkable individuals from the world of sports along with the greatest sporting achievements throughout the year. Messi is the athlete that received the most nominations overall (8—tied with Tiger Woods). In 2020, Messi became the first footballer to win the award, and in 2023 received it for the second time.

Year	Winner(s)	Nominees				
2010	(Jamaica) Usain Bolt (Athletics)	(Ethiopia) Kenenisa Bekele (Athletics)	(Spain) Alberto Contador (Cycling)	(Switzerland) Roger Federer (Tennis)	(Argentina) Lionel Messi (Football)	(Italy) Valentino Rossi (Motorcycling)
2011	(Spain) Rafael Nadal (Tennis)	(United States) Kobe Bryant (Basketball)	(Spain) Andrés Iniesta (Football)	(Argentina) Lionel Messi (Football)	(Philippines) Manny Pacquiao (Boxing)	(Germany) Sebastian Vettel (Formula One)
2012	(Serbia) Novak Djokovic (Tennis)	(Jamaica) Usain Bolt (Athletics)	(Australia) Cadel Evans (Cycling)	(Argentina) Lionel Messi (Football)	(Germany) Dirk Nowitzki (Basketball)	(Germany) Sebastian Vettel (Formula One)
2013	(Jamaica) Usain Bolt (Athletics)	(United Kingdom) Mo Farah (Athletics)	(Argentina) Lionel Messi (Football)	(United States) Michael Phelps (Swimming)	(Germany) Sebastian Vettel (Formula One)	(United Kingdom) Bradley Wiggins (Cycling)
2016	(Serbia) Novak Djokovic (Tennis)	(Jamaica) Usain Bolt (Athletics)	(United States) Stephen Curry (Basketball)	(United Kingdom) Lewis Hamilton (Formula One)	(Argentina) Lionel Messi (Football)	(United States) Jordan Spieth (Golf)
2020	(United Kingdom) Lewis Hamilton (Formula One) (Argentina) Lionel Messi (Football)	(Kenya) Eliud Kipchoge (Athletics)	(Spain) Marc Márquez (Motorcycling)	(Spain) Rafael Nadal (Tennis)	(United States) Tiger Woods (Golf)	
2023	(Argentina) Lionel Messi (Football)	(United States) Stephen Curry (Basketball)	(Sweden) Armand Duplantis (Athletics)	(France) Kylian Mbappé (Football)	(Spain) Rafael Nadal (Tennis)	(Netherlands) Max Verstappen (Formula One)
2024	(Serbia) Novak Djokovic (Tennis)	(Sweden) Armand Duplantis (Athletics)	(Norway) Erling Haaland (Football)	(United States) Noah Lyles (Athletics)	(Argentina) Lionel Messi (Football)	(Netherlands) Max Verstappen (Formula One)

===== Other =====
- Marca Leyenda: 2009
- L'Équipe Champion of Champions (Best male international athlete of the year): 2011, 2022
- Diario AS Ace of Sport (Best athlete of the year): 2019
- Time Athlete of the Year: 2023
- BBC World Sport Star of the Year: 2022
- Gazzetta Sports Best Sportsman of the Year: 2011
- AIPS Best Male Athlete of the Year: 2019, 2022
- ESPY Best International Athlete of the Year: 2012, 2015
- ESPY Best Championship Performance of the Year: 2023
- Premios Juventud Most Electrifying Athlete of the Year: 2014
- Mundo Deportivo Sports Personality of the Year: 2022
- Prensa Latina Best Latin American and Caribbean Athlete of the Year : 2011, 2014, 2022
- Sports Illustrated Latino Sportsman of the Year: 2007
- ESPN Deportes Latino Athlete of the Year: 2009
- The Sporting News Athlete of the Year: 2022
- Kids' Choice Awards Favorite Male Sports Star of the Year: 2026
- The Sporting News Greatest Athlete since 2000: 2025
- Le Journal de Québec Greatest Athlete since 2000: 2025
- ESPN Top 100 Greatest Athlete of the 21st Century: 2024, Third place

- Nominated for the Laureus World Sports Award for Breakthrough of the Year: 2006
- Nominated for the Eurosport World Star of the Year: 2015 (Note: Messi received 17.9 percent (%) of the total votes cast, finishing second in the voting after Novak Djokovic.)
- Nominated for the Eurosport Emotional Moment of the Year: 2016 (Note: "Leo Messi misses penalty in Copa America final defeat" received 13 percent (%) of the total votes cast, finishing on a third-place in the voting.)
- Nominated for the People's Choice Awards Athlete of the Year: 2024
- Nominated for the Teen Choice Awards Male Athlete of the Year: 2019
- Nominated for the Kids' Choice Awards Best Male Athlete/Favorite Male Sport Star of the Year: 2015, 2019, 2021, 2023, 2024, 2025
- Nominated for the ESPY Best Male Athlete of the Year: 2023, 2026
- Nominated for the Associated Press Male Athlete of the Year: 2019, (Note: 12th place) 2023 (Note: Messi and Novak Djokovic each received 16 votes out of 87 AP sports editors votes cast, finishing second in the voting after Shohei Ohtani.)
- Nominated for the Associated Press Male Athlete of the Decade (2010s): 2019
- Nominated for the Sky Sports Athlete of the Decade (2010s): 2019

==== National ====
===== Argentina =====
- Olimpia de Oro (Argentine Sportsperson of the Year): 2011, 2021, 2022, 2023
- Consagración de Oro (Argentine Athlete of the Year) by Clarín: 2011
- Revelación de Oro (Argentine Sport Breakthrough of the Year) by Clarín: 2005 (Note: Shared with Sergio Agüero.)
- Premio de la Gente (Argentina Favorite Athlete of the Year) by Clarín: 2012
- Kids' Choice Awards Argentina (Favorite Athlete of the Year): 2011,2013
- Diamond Konex Award (Argentine Athlete of the Decade) (2011–2020): 2020

===== Spain =====
- Best Ibero-American Athlete of the Year by Spain National Sports Council: 2007
- Most Popular Foreign Athlete in Spain by EFE: 2016
- Premio Valores (Most Popular Athlete in Barcelona history) by Sport: 2025
- Sport Cultura Barcelona Award (Sport category): 2019

===== United States =====
- Hickok Belt Award Professional Athlete of the Month: December 2022
- Most Popular Athlete in the US by SSRS: 2024, 2025, (Note: Shared with LeBron James.) 2026

=== Other ===
- Time 100 Most Influential People in the World : 2011, 2012, 2023 (Note: LeBron James is the only athlete listed four times, and Messi is the only football player listed three times in the Time 100 Most Influential People in the World (in 2011, 2012 and 2023). Messi was also finalist in 2016, 2021 and 2022. Simone Biles, Patrick Mahomes, Naomi Osaka, Serena Williams and Tiger Woods are the other athletes listed three times in Time 100.)
- Time 100 Most Influential People in Sports (Icons category): 2026
- Princess of Asturias Award for Sports: 2026
- Creu de Sant Jordi: 2019
- Presidential Medal of Freedom: 2025
- Key to the City of Miami: 2025
- Rosario City Tricentennial Medal: 2026
- Rosario Ambassador of the world: 2011
- Distinguished Citizen of Rosario: 2011
- Illustrious Citizen of Funes: 2022
- Honorary Doctorate from University of Buenos Aires: 2026
- Honorary Member of River Plate: 2026
- International Values Award (Humanitarian work) by Sport: 2020
- Balón Educativo by Scholas Occurrentes: 2019
- Champions for Peace Award by Peace and Sport: 2020
- UNICEF Goodwill Ambassador (since 2010): 2010
- UNWTO Ambassador for Responsible Tourism (since 2018): 2018

== Records ==
=== World records ===
==== Titles and awards ====
- Most FIFA World Player of the Year/FIFA Ballon d'Or/The Best FIFA Men's Player awards: 8 (2009–2012, 2015, 2019, 2022, 2023)
- Most Ballons d'Or awards (Guinness World Record): 8 (2009–2012, 2015, 2019, 2021, 2023)
- Most The Best FIFA Men's Player awards: 3 (2019, 2022, 2023)
- Only player to have won more than one FIFA World Cup Golden Ball: 2 (2014 and 2022)
- Only player to have won more than one FIFA Club World Cup Golden Ball: 2 (2009 and 2011)
- Only footballer to have won at the Laureus World Sports Awards: 2 (2020, 2023)
- First ever athlete to win the Laureus Sportsman of the Year and Laureus Team of the Year in the same year: 2023
- Most (recorded) Man of the Match awards won in football history: +450
- Most Man of the Match awards won in major international tournaments: 31 (16 in FIFA World Cup, 15 in Copa América)
- Most Man of the Match awards won at the FIFA World Cup (Guinness World Record): 16 (1 in 2010, 4 in 2014, 1 in 2018, 5 in 2022, 5 in 2026)
- Most Man of the Match awards won in a single FIFA World Cup: 5 in 2022, 5 in 2026
- Most Man of the Match awards won at the FIFA Club World Cup finals: 2 (Note: Shared with Cristiano Ronaldo and Vinícius Júnior) (2009 and 2011)
- Only player to have won Man of the Match award in all rounds at the FIFA World Cup tournaments (group stage, round 32, round of 16, quarter-final, semi-final, final): 2006–2026
- First player to have won more than one Most Valuable Player award at the FIFA Club World Cup finals: 2 (2009 and 2011)
- Most FIFA World Cup match victories: 23
- Most Goal Best Player of the Year awards: 7 (2008–09, 2010–11, 2012–13, 2014–15, 2020–21, 2021–22, 2022–23)
- Most Marca Best Player of the Year awards: 3 (2017–2019)
- Most The Guardian Best Footballer of the Year wins: 6 (2012, 2013, 2015, 2017, 2019, 2022)
- Most FourFourTwo (FFT) Best Footballer of the Year wins: 8 (2009–2012, 2015, 2017–2019)
- Most ESPN Best Forward of the Year wins: 8 (2014–2021)
- Most World Soccer Men's World Player of the Year wins: 6 (2009, 2011, 2012, 2015, 2019, 2022)
- Most World Soccer Young Player of the Year wins: 3 (2006–2008)
- Most IFFHS World's Best Playmaker awards: 5 (2015–2017, 2019, 2022)
- Most IFFHS World's Best Top Division Goal Scorer awards: 4 (2012, 2013, 2017, 2018)
- Most appearances in the IFFHS Men's World Team: 7 (2017–2023)
- Most appearances in the FIFPRO World 11: 18 (2007–2023, 2026)
- Most appearances in the FIFA/EA Sports FC Team of the Year: 16 (2008–2023)
- Only player to win a 'Best Player/Golden Ball' award at all official tournaments participated in (FIFA U-20 World Cup, FIFA World Cup and Copa América)
- Most consecutive Ballons d'Or trophies: 4 (2009–2012)
- Only player to win the Ballon d'Or in three different decades: 2000s, 2010s, 2020s
- Only player to win the FIFA World Player of the Year/FIFA Ballon d'Or/The Best FIFA Men's Player Award in three different decades: 2000s, 2010s, 2020s
- Largest gap between first and last Ballon d'Or awards: 14 years (2009–2023)
- Youngest two-time, three-time, four-time, five-time, six-time, seven-time and eight-time Ballon d'Or winner: aged 23, 24, 25, 28, 32, 34 and 36 years old
- Oldest player to win FIFA World Cup Golden Ball: aged 35 years and 178 days, in 2022

- Most nominations overall for the Laureus World Sports Awards: 8 (2010–2013, 2016, 2020, 2023, 2024) (Note: Shared with Tiger Woods.)
- Most nominations overall for the FIFA Ballon d'Or Award: 6 (2010–2015)
- Most nominations overall for The Best FIFA Men's Player: 9 (2016–2024)
- Most nominations overall for the FIFA Puskás Award: 7 (2010–2012, 2015, 2016, 2018, 2019)

==== Performances ====
- Most (official) non-penalty goals scored in football history: 822
- Most (official) left foot goals scored in football history: 788
- Most (official) outside the box goals scored in football history: 109 (Note: Excluding direct free kick goals.)
- Most (official) assists provided in football history: 428
- Most (official) goal contributions in football history: 1,365
- Most (official) goals scored for a single club (Guinness World Record): 672, for Barcelona
- Most (recorded) assists provided for a single club: 269, for Barcelona
- Most goals scored at major international tournaments: 35 (21 goals at FIFA World Cup, 14 goals at Copa América)
- Most assists provided at major international tournaments: 30 (12 assists at FIFA World Cup, 18 assists at Copa América)
- Most goal contributions at major international tournaments: 65 (21 goals and 10 assists at FIFA World Cup, 14 goals and 18 assists at Copa América)
- Most goal contributions at international tournaments' knockout matches: 37
- Most goals scored in a single domestic league: 474, in La Liga
- Most assists provided in a single domestic league: 192, in La Liga
- Most goals scored in FIFA competitions: 33 (21 at FIFA World Cup, 6 at FIFA U-20 World Cup, 6 at FIFA Club World Cup)
- Most goals scored at the FIFA World Cup group stage: 14 (1 in 2006, 4 in 2014, 1 in 2018, 2 in 2022, 6 in 2026) (Note: Among FIFA World Cup top goalscorers who have scored at least 14 overall goals, Miroslav Klose ranks second behind Messi in group stage goals, with 11 of his overall goals coming in the group stage.)
- Most direct free kick goals scored at the FIFA World Cup: 2 (Note: Shared with Rivellino, Bernard Genghini and David Beckham.)
- Most outside the box goals scored at the FIFA World Cup: 6 (Note: Including direct free kick goals.)
- Most assists provided at the FIFA World Cup: 12 (1 in 2006, 1 in 2010, 1 in 2014, 2 in 2018, 3 in 2022, 4 in 2026)
- Most assists provided in the FIFA World Cup knockout stage: 10 (1 in 2010, 1 in 2014, 2 in 2018, 2 in 2022, 4 in 2026)
- Most goal contributions at the FIFA World Cup: 33
- Most goals scored in the FIFA Club World Cup finals: 4 (1 in 2009, 2 in 2011, 1 in 2015)
- Most goals scored in finals: 36
- Most goal contributions in finals: 54 (36 goals and 18 assists)
- Most assists provided in all national team competitions, including friendlies: 67
- Most hat-tricks scored in all national team competitions: 11
- Most (official) goals scored for club and country in a calendar year (Guinness World Record): 91 in 2012
- Most goals scored for club and country in a calendar year (including club friendlies): 96 in 2012
- Most goals scored in all club competitions in a calendar year: 79 in 2012 (Note: At top-level football, excluding regional and local competitions.)
- Most goals scored in all club competitions in a season: 73 in 2011–12 (Note: At top-level football, excluding regional and local competitions.)
- Most assists provided in a domestic league in a season: 21 in 2019–20 (Note: Shared with Thomas Müller, Bruno Fernandes, Carlos Valderrama and Míchel.)
- Most consecutive seasons to score 30+ goals in all club competitions: 13
- Most consecutive seasons to score 40+ goals in all club competitions: 10
- Most consecutive seasons to score 60+ goals in all club competitions: 2 (2011–12 and 2012–13)
- Only player to score and assist in six different club competitions in a calendar year: 2011
- Longest goalscoring run in a domestic league: 21 matches, 33 goals in 2012–13
- First player to score consecutively against all teams in a professional league: 2012–13
- First player to score in all five rounds of a FIFA World Cup (group stage, round of 16, quarter-final, semi-final, final): 2022
- First player to score in all six rounds at the FIFA World Cup tournaments (group stage, round 32, round of 16, quarter-final, semi-final, final): 2006–2026
- Most FIFA World Cup tournaments assisted in (Guinness World Record): 6 (2006, 2010, 2014, 2018, 2022, 2026)
- Most consecutive FIFA World Cup tournaments assisted in: 6 (2006, 2010, 2014, 2018, 2022, 2026)
- Most FIFA World Cup matches scored in: 16
- Most consecutive FIFA World Cup matches scored in: 9 (4 in 2022, 5 in 2026)
- Most consecutive FIFA World Cup knockout stage matches scored in: 6 (4 in 2022, 2 in 2026)
- Most consecutive FIFA World Cup matches scored or assisted in: 11 (4 in 2022, 7 in 2026)
- Most total dribbles completed at the FIFA World Cup: 140
- Most FIFA World Cup tournaments played in (Guinness World Record): 6 (2006, 2010, 2014, 2018, 2022, 2026) (Note: Shared with Cristiano Ronaldo)
- Most appearances at the FIFA World Cup final (Guinness World Record): 3 (2014, 2022, 2026) (Note: Shared with Cafu)
- Most appearances at the FIFA World Cup matches: 34 (3 in 2006, 5 in 2010, 7 in 2014, 4 in 2018, 7 in 2022, 8 in 2026)
- Most appearances at the FIFA World Cup matches as captain (Guinness World Record): 27 (1 in 2010, 7 in 2014, 4 in 2018, 7 in 2022, 8 in 2026)
- Most minutes played at the FIFA World Cup: 3,053
- Only player to score in his teens, his twenties and his thirties in the history of the FIFA World Cup
- Only player to provide at least one assist in five and six different FIFA World Cup tournaments: 2006, 2010, 2014, 2018,2022 and 2026
- Only player to score in three different FIFA Club World Cup final matches: 2009, 2011 and 2015
- Youngest player to score a goal and assist in a single FIFA World Cup match: aged 18 years and 357 days, against Serbia and Montenegro in 2006
- Oldest player to score a goal and assist in a single FIFA World Cup match: aged 39 years and 13 days, against Egypt in 2026
- Oldest player to score a hat-trick at the FIFA World Cup (Guinness World Record): aged 38 years and 357 days, against Algeria in 2026

=== Europe records ===
==== Titles and awards ====
- Most European Golden Shoe awards (Guinness World Record): 6 (2010, 2012, 2013, 2017–2019)
- Most UEFA/UEFA.com Goal of the Season awards: 4 (2014–15, 2015–16, 2018–19, 2022–23)
- Most Man of the Match awards won in UEFA Champions League history: 67
- Most Onze d'Or awards: 4 (2009, 2010–11, 2011–12, 2017–18)
- Most appearances in the ESM Team of the Season: 15 (2006, 2008–2013, 2015–2021, 2023)
- Most appearances in the UEFA Champions League Squad of the Season: 7 (2015–2021)
- Most consecutive European Golden Shoe awards: 3 (2017–2019)
- Most consecutive UEFA/UEFA.com Goal of the Season awards: 2 (2014–15 and 2015–16)

- Most nominations overall for the UEFA Men's Player of the Year Award: 12 (2010–11 to 2020–21, 2022–23)
- Most nominations overall for the UEFA Champions League Forward of the Season: 5 (2016–17 to 2020–21)

==== Performances ====
- Most goals scored in all club competitions in Europe: 704, (Note: At top-level football, excluding regional and local competitions.) in Spain (672) and France (32)
- Most goals in the UEFA Super Cup: 3 (Note: Shared with seven other players.)
- Most goals scored in Europe's top 5 leagues: 496, in La Liga (474) and Ligue 1 (22)
- Most goals scored for a single club in the UEFA Champions League: 120 for Barcelona
- Most goals scored in the UEFA Champions League group stage: 80
- Most goals scored in the UEFA Champions League round of 16: 29
- Most goals scored in a UEFA Champions League round of 16 tie: 6, against Bayer Leverkusen in 2011–12
- Most hat-tricks scored in the UEFA Champions League (Guinness World Record): 8
- Most goals scored in all club competitions in a calendar year in Europe: 79 in 2012 (Note: At top-level football, excluding regional and local competitions.)
- Most goals scored in all club competitions in a season in Europe: 73 in 2011–12 (Note: At top-level football, excluding regional and local competitions.)
- Most goals scored in a league in a calendar year across Europe's top 5 leagues: 59 goals in 2012
- Most goals scored in a league season across Europe's top 5 leagues: 50 in 2011–12
- Most assists provided in a league season across Europe's top 5 leagues: 21 assists in 2019–20 (Note: Shared with Thomas Müller, Bruno Fernandes and Míchel)
- First player to score more than one hat-trick in a UEFA Champions League season (Guinness World Record): 2, against Viktoria Plzeň on 1 November 2011 and Bayer Leverkusen on 7 March 2012
- Most goals scored in a European Cup/UEFA Champions League match (Guinness World Record): 5, against Bayer Leverkusen on 7 March 2012 (Note: Shared with Erling Haaland and Luiz Adriano.)
- Most goals scored in a European Cup/UEFA Champions League quarter-final match: 4, against Arsenal on 6 April 2010 (Note: Shared with Sándor Kocsis and Alfredo Di Stéfano.)
- Most dribbles completed in a UEFA Champions League match: 16, against Manchester United on 29 April 2008 (Note: Shared with Neymar and Javier Zanetti.)
- Most consecutive UEFA Champions League seasons scored in (Guinness World Record): 18 (2005–06 to 2022–23) (Note: Shared with Karim Benzema.)
- First player to score in 15 and 16 consecutive seasons of the UEFA Champions League
- Fastest player ever to reach 300 goals in Europe's top 5 leagues: in 334 matches
- Fastest player ever to reach 400 goals in Europe's top 5 leagues: in 435 matches
- Fastest player to reach 100 UEFA Champions League goals: in 123 matches
- Fastest player to reach 100 UEFA Champions League goal contributions: in 101 matches (77 goals and 23 assists)
- Youngest player to score 100 goals in the UEFA Champions League: aged 30 years, 263 days
- Youngest player to score 50 goals in the UEFA Champions League (Guinness World Record): aged 24 years, 285 days
- Youngest player ever to score 400+ goals for a single European club: aged 27 years and 300 days, for Barcelona

=== Americas records ===
==== Titles and awards ====
- Most Copa América Best Player awards: 2 (2015 and 2021)
- Most appearances in the Copa América Team of the Tournament: 6 (2007, 2011, 2015, 2016, 2021, 2024)
- Most Copa América match victories: 25
- Most Man of the Match awards won in Copa América matches: 15 (2 in 2011, 4 in 2015, 3 in 2016, 1 in 2019, 4 in 2021, 1 in 2024)
- Most man of the match awards won in a single Copa América tournament: 4 (2015, 2021)
- Most IFFHS Best Player of CONMEBOL: 3 (2020, 2021,2022)
- Most appearances in the IFFHS Men's CONMEBOL Team: 6 (2020, 2021, 2022, 2023, 2024, 2025)

==== Performances ====
- Most international caps by a male CONMEBOL player: 208
- Most international goals scored by a male CONMEBOL player: 126
- Most international assists provided by a male CONMEBOL player (World Record): 67
- Most goals scored in the FIFA World Cup qualification – CONMEBOL: 36
- Most hat-tricks scored in the FIFA World Cup qualification – CONMEBOL: 3
- Most assists provided in the Copa América: 18 (1 in 2007, 3 in 2011, 3 in 2015, 4 in 2016, 1 in 2019, 5 in 2021, 1 in 2024)
- Most direct free kick goals scored in the Copa América: 4
- Most Copa América tournaments scored in: 6 (2007, 2015, 2016, 2019, 2021, 2024) (Note: Shared with Zizinho.)
- Most goals scored by a substitute in a Copa América match (Guinness World Record): 3, against Panama on 10 June 2016 (Note: Shared with Paulo Valentim.)
- Only player to provide at least one assist in five, six and seven different Copa América tournaments: 2007, 2011, 2015, 2016, 2019, 2021 and 2024
- Most appearances at the Copa América: 39
- Most appearances at the Copa América finals: 5 (2007, 2015, 2016, 2021, 2024)
- Most appearances at the FIFA World Cup qualification – CONMEBOL: 72 (Note: Shared with Iván Hurtado.)
- Most stadiums scored at in the FIFA World Cup qualification – CONMEBOL: 14
- Most goals scored in a single Leagues Cup competition: 10 in 2023
- Most goal contributions in a single Leagues Cup competition: 11 in 2023

=== National records ===
==== Argentina ====
===== Titles and awards =====
- Most Olimpia de Oro (Argentine Sportsperson of the Year) awards: 4 (2011, 2021–2023)
- Most Olimpia de Plata (Argentine Footballer of the Year) awards: 16 (2005, 2007–2013, 2015–2017, 2019–2023)
- Only player to have won more than one Platinum Konex (Argentine Footballer of the Decade) awards: 2 (2010s and 2020s)

===== Performances =====
- Argentina all-time most capped player (CONMEBOL Record): 208 caps
- Argentina all-time top goalscorer (CONMEBOL Record): 126
- Argentina all-time top assist provider (World Record): 67
- Argentina U20 all-time top goalscorer: 14
- Most goals scored in competitive matches for Argentina: 71
- Most goals scored in international friendlies for Argentina: 55
- Most goals scored in a calendar year for Argentina: 18 in 2022
- Most goals scored in a single match for Argentina: 5, against Estonia on 5 June 2022 (Note: Shared with Juan Marvezzi.)
- Most direct free kick goals scored in all international competitions, including friendlies for Argentina: 12
- Most hat-tricks scored in all international competitions, including friendlies for Argentina (World Record): 11
- Most goals scored overall in FIFA World Cup matches for Argentina (CONMEBOL Record): 21 (1 in 2006, 4 in 2014, 1 in 2018, 7 in 2022, 8 in 2026)
- Most goals scored in a single FIFA World Cup tournament for Argentina: 8 in 2026 (Note: Shared with Guillermo Stábile.)
- Most goals scored overall in FIFA World Cup qualification matches for Argentina (CONMEBOL Record): 36
- Most goals scored in a single FIFA World Cup qualification campaign for Argentina: 10 in 2014 qualification
- Most FIFA World Cup tournaments scored in for Argentina: 5 (2006, 2014, 2018, 2022, 2026)
- Most FIFA World Cup tournaments assisted in for Argentina (Guinness World Record): 6 (2006, 2010, 2014, 2018, 2022, 2026)
- Most appearances in FIFA World Cup matches for Argentina (Guinness World Record): 34 (3 in 2006, 5 in 2010, 7 in 2014, 4 in 2018, 7 in 2022, 8 in 2026)
- Most FIFA World Cup tournaments played in for Argentina (Guinness World Record): 6 (2006, 2010, 2014, 2018, 2022, 2026)
- Most Copa América tournaments played in for Argentina: 7 (2007, 2011, 2015, 2016, 2019, 2021, 2024)
- Only Argentina player to score against every CONMEBOL nation
- Youngest player to play for Argentina in a FIFA World Cup: aged 18 years and 357 days in 2006
- Youngest player to score for Argentina in a FIFA World Cup: aged 18 years and 357 days, against Serbia and Montenegro in 2006
- Youngest player to captain Argentina in a FIFA World Cup: aged 22 years and 363 days in 2010
- Youngest player to reach 100 caps for Argentina: aged 27 years and 361 days in 2015
- Oldest player to score for Argentina: aged 39 years and 104 days, against Benin in 2026

==== Spain ====
===== Titles and awards =====
- Most Supercopa de España titles won: 8 (all with Barcelona)
- Most La Liga titles won by a non-Spanish individual: 10 (all with Barcelona)
- Most Copa del Rey titles won: 7 (Note: Shared with José Maria Belauste, Piru Gaínza, Gerard Piqué and Sergio Busquets) (all with Barcelona)
- Most Best Player/Most Valuable Player in La Liga awards: 9 (2009–2013, 2015, 2017-2019)
- Most Best Player in La Liga awards: 6 (2009–2013, 2015)
- Most Best Forward in La Liga awards: 7 (2009–2013, 2015–2016)
- Most Pichichi Trophies in La Liga awards (Guinness World Record): 8 (2010, 2012–2013, 2017–2021)
- Most consecutive Pichichi Trophies in La Liga awards: 5 (2017–2021)
- Most Trofeo Alfredo Di Stéfano in La Liga awards: 7 (2008–09, 2009–10, 2010–11, 2014–15, 2016–17, 2017–18, 2018–19)
- Most Trofeo EFE awards in Spanish football: 5 (2007, 2009–2012)
- Most Player of the Month awards in La Liga history: 8 (Note: Shared with Antoine Griezmann) (January 2016, April 2017, April 2018, September 2018, March 2019, November 2019, February 2020, February 2021)
- Most Man of the Match awards won in La Liga history: 227
- Most Man of the Match awards won in Copa del Rey finals: 3 (2015, 2017, 2021)
- Most La Liga match victories: 383

===== Performances =====
- Most goals scored in all official club competitions in Spanish football: 672
- Most goals scored in all club competitions including friendlies in Spanish football: 709
- Most goals scored in Supercopa de España: 14
- Most goals scored in La Liga (Guinness World Record): 474
- Most assists provided in La Liga (Guinness World Record): 192
- Most La Liga matches scored in: 300
- Most goals scored in Supercopa de España finals: 7
- Most Supercopa de España finals scored in: 7
- Most goals scored in Copa del Rey finals: 9
- Most assists provided in Copa del Rey finals: 6 (1 in 2009, 2 in 2016, 1 in 2017, 2 in 2018)
- Most Copa del Rey finals scored in: 7 (2009, 2012, 2015, 2017, 2018, 2019, 2021)
- Most braces scored in La Liga: 133
- Most hat-tricks scored in La Liga (Guinness World Record): 36
- Most goals scored from direct free kick in La Liga: 39
- Most goals scored in all club competitions in a calendar year in Spanish football: 79 in 2012
- Most goals scored in all club competitions in a season in Spanish football: 73 in 2011–12
- Most goals scored in La Liga in a calendar year: 59 in 2012
- Most goals scored in a La Liga season (Guinness World Record): 50 in 2011–12
- Most assists provided in a La Liga season (Guinness World Record): 21 in 2019–20 (Note: Shared with Míchel in 1987–88.)
- Most hat-tricks scored in a La Liga season: 8 in 2011–12
- Most teams scored against in a La Liga season: 19 in 2012–13 (Note: Shared with Ronaldo Nazário and Cristiano Ronaldo.)
- Most home goals in a La Liga season (38 matches, 19 home matches): 35 in 2011–12
- Most away goals in a La Liga season (38 matches, 19 away matches): 24 in 2012–13
- Most matches scored in a La Liga season (38 games): 27 in 2012–13
- Most home matches scored in a La Liga season (38 games): 16 in 2011–12
- Most away matches scored in a La Liga season (38 games): 15 in 2012–13
- Most different opponents scored against in La Liga history: 38
- Most stadiums scored at in La Liga history: 38
- Most consecutive Supercopa de España finals scored in: 4 (Note: Shared with Robert Lewandowski) (2009, 2010, 2011, 2012)
- Most consecutive La Liga match scored in (Guinness World Record): 21 (33 goals, from matchday 11 to matchday 34, season 2012–13)
- Most consecutive away La Liga matches scored in: 13 (20 goals from matchday 8 to matchday 33 in 2012–13)
- Most appearances in Supercopa de España: 20
- Most appearances in La Liga by a foreign player (Guinness World Record): 520
- Most appearances in Copa del Rey finals: 10 (Note: Shared with Sergio Busquets) (2009, 2011, 2012, 2014, 2015, 2016, 2017, 2018, 2019, 2021)
- Most dribbles completed in a La Liga match: 15, against Real Betis on 4 November 2007
- Most dribbles completed in a Copa del Rey match: 23, against Villarreal on 31 January 2008
- Most La Liga seasons to score 40+ goals: 3 (Note: Lionel Messi, Cristiano Ronaldo and Luis Suárez are the only players scored 40+ goals in a single La Liga season.)
- Most La Liga seasons to score 30+ goals: 9
- Most consecutive La Liga seasons to score 20+ goals: 13 (Guinness World Record)
- Most consecutive La Liga seasons to score 10+ goals: 15 (from 2006–07 to 2020–21)
- Only player to be top goalscorer and top assist provider in the same La Liga season: 2017–18, 2018–19 and 2019–20 (Note: Along with Luis Suárez.)
- Only player to score consecutively against all opposition teams in La Liga: 19 matches, 30 goals in 2012–13
- Only player to score 350+ goals in La Liga history
- Only player to provide 150+ assists in La Liga history
- First player to reach 300 La Liga goals
- First player to reach 150 La Liga assists
- Youngest player to score 200 goals in La Liga: aged 25 years and 7 months
- Youngest player to score 300 goals in La Liga: aged 28 years and 7 months (Note: Only two players have scored 300 or more goals in La Liga: Lionel Messi and Cristiano Ronaldo. Messi scored his 300th La Liga goal on February 2016, at the age of 28 years and 7 months, while Cristiano Ronaldo scored his 300th on February 2018, at the age of 33 years.)

==== France ====
===== Performances =====
- Most assists in Ligue 1 in a calendar year: 20 in 2022

==== United States ====
===== Titles and awards =====
- Most Landon Donovan MVP trophies in Major League Soccer awards: 2 (Note: Shared with Preki.) (2024, 2025)
- Most MLS Golden Boots in Major League Soccer awards: 2 (Note: Shared with Bradley Wright-Phillips, Chris Wondolowski, Jeff Cunningham, Taylor Twellman & Preki.) (2025, 2026)
- Most consecutive Landon Donovan MVP trophies in Major League Soccer awards: 2 (2024, 2025)
- Most consecutive MLS Golden Boots in Major League Soccer awards: 2 ( 2025, 2026)
- Most Player of the Matchday awards in a single Major League Soccer season: 6 in 2024 and 6 in 2025 (Note: Shared with Jason Kreis and Carlos Vela.)

===== Performances =====
- Most goals in a calendar year across all club competitions: 43 in 2025
- Most multi-goal games in a single MLS season: 10 in 2025
- Most goal contributions in a single MLS Cup playoff campaign: 15 (6 goals and 9 assists) in 2025
- Most assists in a single MLS Cup playoff campaign: 9 in 2025
- Most assists in a single MLS match (Guinness World Record): 5, against New York Red Bulls on 4 May 2024
- Most goal contributions in a single MLS match: 6, against New York Red Bulls on 4 May 2024
- Most consecutive MLS seasons scoring 20+ goals: 3 (Note: Shared with Denis Bouanga.)
- Most consecutive MLS seasons providing 15+ assists: 3
- First player to score a brace in four and five consecutive MLS games: 2025
- Fastest player to reach 100 goals across all club competitions: 115 games
- Fastest player to reach 100 goal contributions across all club competitions: 80 games (66 goals and 34 assists)
- Fastest player to reach 100 goal contributions in MLS history: 64 games (59 goals and 41 assists)

=== Club records ===
==== Barcelona ====
===== Titles and awards =====
- Most titles won as a Barcelona player: 35
- Most match victories as a Barcelona player: 542
- Most La Liga match victories as a Barcelona player: 383
- Most FC Barcelona Trofeo Aldo Rovira awards: 6 (2009–10, 2010–11, 2012–13, 2014–15, 2016–17, 2017–18)

===== Performances =====
- Most goals scored in all official competitions for Barcelona: 672
- Most assists provided in all official competitions for Barcelona: 269
- Most goals scored in all competitions including friendlies for Barcelona: 709
- Most goals scored in international competitions for Barcelona: 128
- Most goals scored in European competitions for Barcelona: 123
- Most goals scored in the FIFA Club World Cup for Barcelona: 5
- Most goals scored in the UEFA Super Cup for Barcelona: 3
- Most goals scored in the UEFA Champions League for Barcelona: 120
- Most goals scored in Supercopa de España for Barcelona: 14
- Most goals scored in La Liga for Barcelona: 474
- Most goals scored in El Clásico for Barcelona: 26 (Note: Does not include a goal scored in the 2017 International Champions Cup.)
- Most assists provided in El Clásico for Barcelona: 14
- Most goals scored in the Derbi barceloní for Barcelona: 25
- Most goals scored in the Athletic–Barcelona clásico for Barcelona: 29
- Most hat-tricks scored in all competitions for Barcelona: 48
- Most goals scored from direct free kick in official competitions for Barcelona: 50
- Most home goals scored in a single season in all competitions for Barcelona: 46 in 2011–12
- Most appearances in official competitions for Barcelona: 778
- Most appearances in La Liga for Barcelona: 520
- Most appearances in Copa del Rey for Barcelona: 80
- First Barca player to be top goalscorer in four, five, six, seven and eight La Liga seasons (2009–10, 2011–13, 2016–21)

==== Inter Miami ====
===== Titles and awards =====
- Most Inter Miami CF MVP awards: 3 (2023, 2024, 2025)

===== Performances =====
- Most goals scored in all official competitions for Inter Miami: 107
- Most assists provided in all official competitions for Inter Miami: 58
- Most goal contributions in all official competitions for Inter Miami: 165
- Most goals scored in a regular MLS season for Inter Miami: 29 in 2025
- Most assists provided in a regular MLS season for Inter Miami: 16 in 2025
- Most goal contributions in a regular MLS season for Inter Miami: 45 in 2025
- Most goals scored in a single match for Inter Miami: 4
- Most assists provided in a single match for Inter Miami: 5
- Most goal contributions in a single match for Inter Miami: 6
- Only player to score 100+ goals in all official competitions for Inter Miami

=== Other records ===
- Most MVP awards in Joan Gamper Trophy: 4 (2013, 2014, 2016, 2018)
- Most goals scored in Joan Gamper Trophy: 9 (2 in 2011, 1 in 2013, 1 in 2014, 1 in 2015, 2 in 2016, 1 in 2017, 1 in 2018)

== See also ==
- List of international goals scored by Lionel Messi
- List of Argentina national football team records and statistics
- List of FC Barcelona records and statistics
- List of Inter Miami CF records and statistics
- List of Paris Saint-Germain FC records and statistics
- Messi–Ronaldo rivalry

== Footnotes ==
Note
