= El País King of European Soccer =

Annual football award

El País King of European Soccer (alternative: El País European Player of the Year) was an annual football award given by Uruguayan newspaper El País to the best footballer in Europe. It had been decided by several European sports experts, critics and journalists based on votes. Any player from a European team was eligible, regardless their country of origin. It was first awarded in 1991 with French Jean-Pierre Papin having been the inaugural winner. The last winner was Argentine Lionel Messi in 2012. Messi and Zinedine Zidane are the record winners of the award with four wins each.

== Winners ==
Year	Rank	Player	Club	Points
1991	1st	(France) Jean-Pierre Papin	(France) Marseille	—
1992	1st	(Netherlands) Marco van Basten	(Italy) AC Milan	—
1993	1st	(Italy) Roberto Baggio	(Italy) Juventus	—
1993	2nd	(Italy) Paolo Maldini	(Italy) AC Milan	—
1994	1st	(Italy) Paolo Maldini	(Italy) AC Milan	—
1994	2nd	(Bulgaria) Hristo Stoichkov	(Spain) Barcelona	—
1995	1st	(Liberia) George Weah	(Italy) AC Milan	—
1995	2nd	(Italy) Paolo Maldini	(Italy) AC Milan	—
1996	1st	(Brazil) Ronaldo	(Spain) Barcelona	—
1997	1st	(Brazil) Ronaldo	(Italy) Inter Milan	—
1998	1st	(France) Zinedine Zidane	(Italy) Juventus	—
1999	1st	(Brazil) Rivaldo	(Spain) Barcelona	75
1999	2nd	(England) David Beckham	(England) Manchester United	44
1999	3rd	(Portugal) Luís Figo	(Spain) Barcelona	23
2000	1st	(Portugal) Luís Figo	(Spain) Real Madrid	45
2000	2nd	(France) Zinedine Zidane	(Italy) Juventus	40
2000	3rd	(Italy) Alessandro Nesta	(Italy) Lazio	30
2001	1st	(France) Zinedine Zidane	(Spain) Real Madrid	41
2001	2nd	(England) Michael Owen	(England) Liverpool	40
2001	3rd	(Spain) Raúl	(Spain) Real Madrid	36
2002	1st	(France) Zinedine Zidane	(Spain) Real Madrid	59
2002	2nd	(Brazil) Roberto Carlos	(Spain) Real Madrid	43
2002	3rd	(Germany) Oliver Kahn	(Germany) Bayern Munich	34
2003	1st	(France) Zinedine Zidane	(Spain) Real Madrid	45
2003	2nd	(Czech Republic) Pavel Nedvěd	(Italy) Juventus	38
2003	3rd	(Brazil) Roberto Carlos	(Spain) Real Madrid	31
2004	1st	(Brazil) Ronaldinho	(Spain) Barcelona	—
2004	2nd	(France) Thierry Henry	(England) Arsenal	—
2004	3rd	(Czech Republic) Pavel Nedvěd	(Italy) Juventus	—
2005	1st	(Brazil) Ronaldinho	(Spain) Barcelona	59
2005	2nd	(England) Frank Lampard	(England) Chelsea	33
2005	3rd	(England) John Terry	(England) Chelsea	24
2006	1st	(Brazil) Ronaldinho	(Spain) Barcelona	54
2006	2nd	(Italy) Fabio Cannavaro	(Spain) Real Madrid	43
2006	3rd	(France) Thierry Henry	(England) Arsenal	35
2007	1st	(Brazil) Kaká	(Italy) AC Milan	—
2007	2nd	(Argentina) Lionel Messi	(Spain) Barcelona	—
2007	3rd	(Portugal) Cristiano Ronaldo	(England) Manchester United	—
2008	1st	(Portugal) Cristiano Ronaldo	(England) Manchester United	64
2008	2nd	(Argentina) Lionel Messi	(Spain) Barcelona	57
2008	3rd	(Italy) Gianluigi Buffon	(Italy) Juventus	—
2009	1st	(Argentina) Lionel Messi	(Spain) Barcelona	—
2010	1st	(Argentina) Lionel Messi	(Spain) Barcelona	—
2011	1st	(Argentina) Lionel Messi	(Spain) Barcelona	—
2012	1st	(Argentina) Lionel Messi	(Spain) Barcelona	108
2012	2nd	(Spain) Andrés Iniesta	(Spain) Barcelona	93
2012	3rd	(Portugal) Cristiano Ronaldo	(Spain) Real Madrid	9

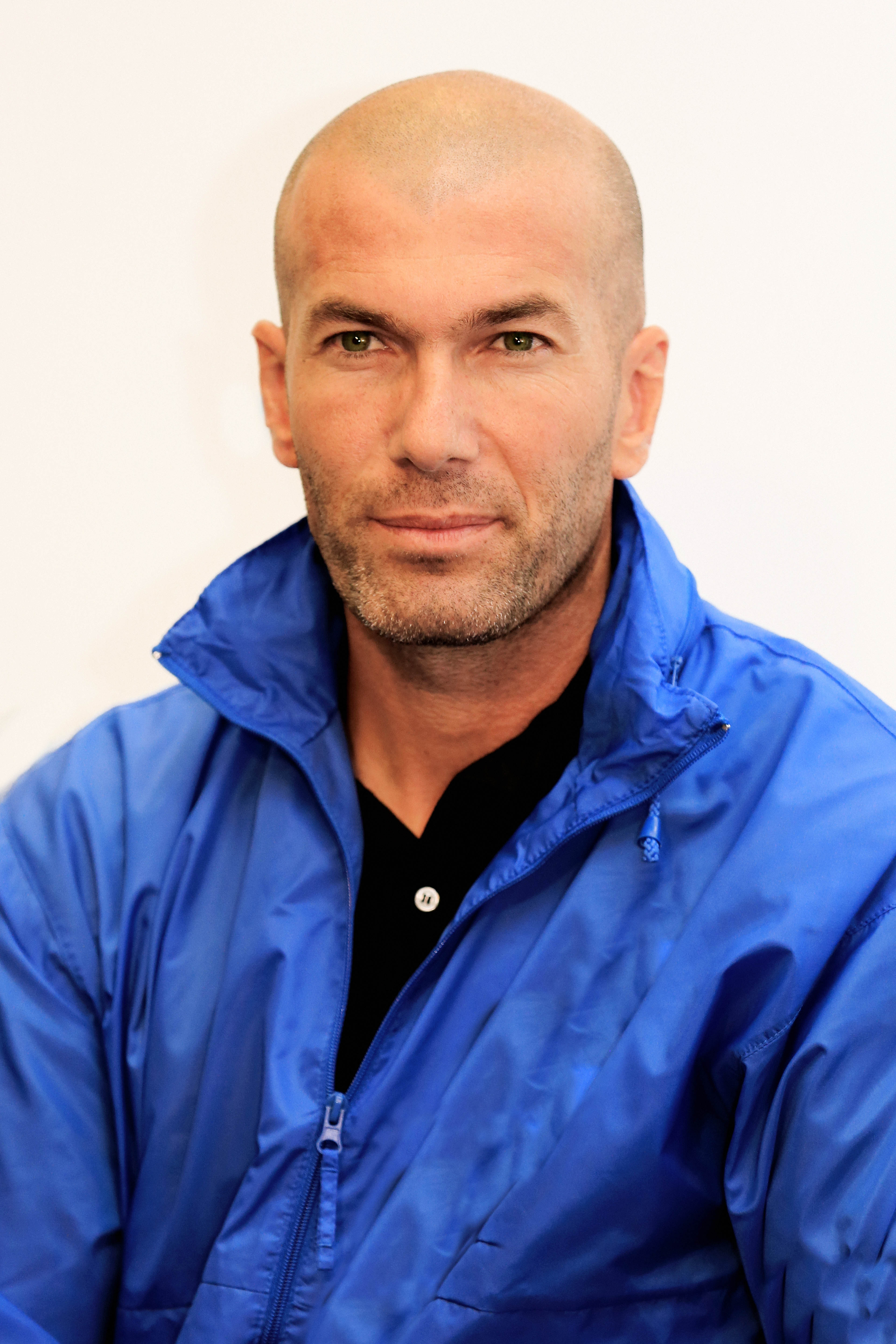
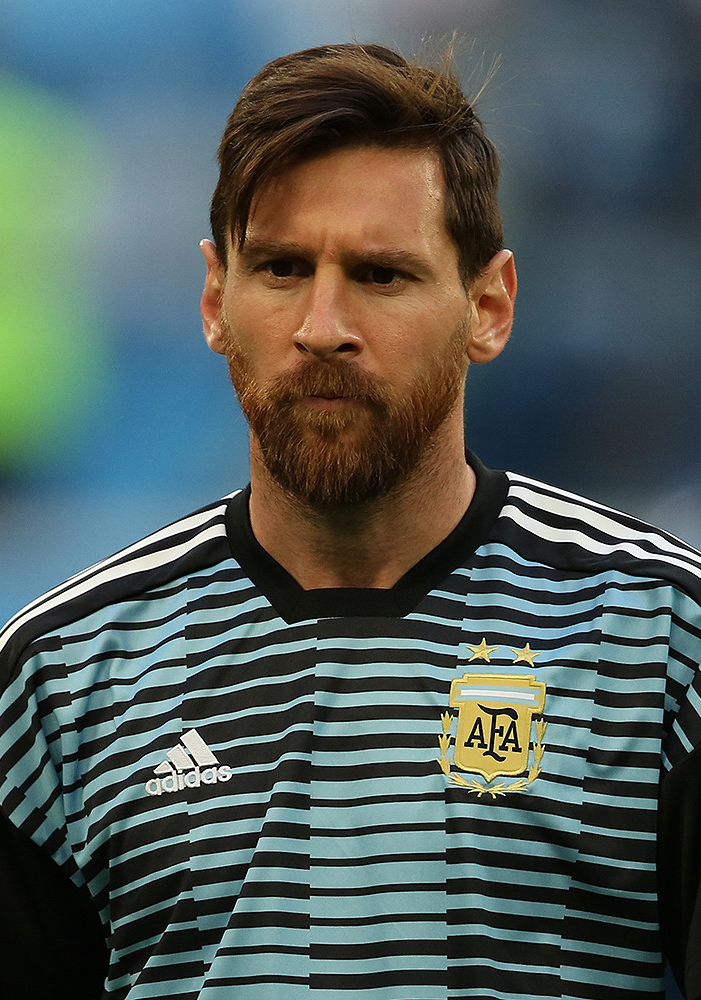
Zinedine Zidane (left) and Lionel Messi hold the record for the most wins, with 4 each.

=== Most wins by player ===
Consecutive wins

- Lionel Messi is the only player in history to win the award in 4 consecutive years (2009, 2010, 2011, 2012).
- Zinedine Zidane and Ronaldinho won the award in 3 successive years (2001, 2002, 2003 and 2004, 2005, 2006, respectively).
- Brazilian Ronaldo won the award twice in a row (1996, 1997).

== European Coach of the Year ==
Year	Rank	Player	Team	Points
1991	1st	(France) Michel Platini	France	—
1992	1st	(Netherlands) Johan Cruyff	(Spain) Barcelona	—
1993	1st	(Netherlands) Johan Cruyff	(Spain) Barcelona	—
1994	1st	(Netherlands) Johan Cruyff	(Spain) Barcelona	—
1995	1st	(Netherlands) Louis van Gaal	(Netherlands) Ajax	—
1996	1st	(Italy) Marcello Lippi	(Italy) Juventus	—
1997	1st	(Italy) Marcello Lippi	(Italy) Juventus	—
1998	1st	(Italy) Marcello Lippi	(Italy) Juventus	—
1999	1st	(Scotland) Alex Ferguson	(England) Manchester United	35
1999	2nd	(Netherlands) Louis van Gaal	(Spain) Barcelona	17
1999	3rd	(Sweden) Sven-Göran Eriksson	(Italy) Lazio	14
2000	1st	(Scotland) Alex Ferguson	(England) Manchester United	—
2001	1st	(Germany) Ottmar Hitzfeld	(Germany) Bayern Munich	—
2002	1st	(France) Arsène Wenger	(England) Arsenal	30
2002	2nd	(Spain) Vicente del Bosque	(Spain) Real Madrid	28
2002	3rd	(Germany) Klaus Toppmöller	(Germany) Bayer Leverkusen	24
2003	1st	(Scotland) Alex Ferguson	(England) Manchester United	25
2003	2nd	(Italy) Fabio Capello	(Italy) Roma	24
2003	2nd	(Italy) Marcello Lippi	(Italy) Juventus	24
2004	1st	(Portugal) José Mourinho	(Portugal) Porto (England) Chelsea	—
2004	2nd	(France) Arsène Wenger	(England) Arsenal	—
2004	3rd	(Italy) Fabio Capello	(Italy) Roma (Italy) Juventus	—
2004	3rd	(Germany) Otto Rehhagel	Greece	
2005	1st	(Portugal) José Mourinho	(England) Chelsea	48
2005	2nd	(Spain) Rafael Benítez	(England) Liverpool	32
2005	2nd	(Italy) Fabio Capello	(Italy) Juventus	32
2006	1st	(Portugal) José Mourinho	(England) Chelsea	46
2006	2nd	(Netherlands) Frank Rijkaard	(Spain) Barcelona	43
2007	1st	(France) Arsène Wenger	(England) Arsenal	—
2007	2nd	(Scotland) Alex Ferguson	(England) Manchester United	—
2008	1st	(Scotland) Alex Ferguson	(England) Manchester United	—
2012	1st	(Spain) Vicente del Bosque	Spain	—
2012	2nd	(Portugal) José Mourinho	(Spain) Real Madrid	—
2012	3rd	(Spain) Pep Guardiola	(Spain) Barcelona	—

== Team of the Year ==
At least in some years El País also selected a Team of the Year.

Year	Goalkeeper	Defenders	Midfielders	Forwards
1993	(Denmark) Peter Schmeichel	(Italy) Paolo Maldini (Germany) Lothar Matthäus (Germany) Jürgen Kohler (Spain) Albert Ferrer	(Denmark) Michael Laudrup (Netherlands) Dennis Bergkamp (Bulgaria) Hristo Stoichkov	(Wales) Ryan Giggs (Brazil) Romário (Italy) Roberto Baggio
1994	(Belgium) Michel Preud'homme	(Italy) Paolo Maldini (Portugal) Fernando Couto (Brazil) Jorginho	(Romania) Gheorghe Hagi (Bulgaria) Hristo Stoichkov (Sweden) Tomas Brolin (Russia) Andrei Kanchelskis	(Brazil) Romário (Italy) Roberto Baggio (Denmark) Michael Laudrup
1995	(Denmark) Peter Schmeichel	(Italy) Paolo Maldini (Italy) Franco Baresi (Germany) Matthias Sammer	(Italy) Alessandro Del Piero (Spain) Fernando Hierro (Finland) Jari Litmanen (Portugal) Paulo Sousa (Socialist Federal Republic of Yugoslavia) Dejan Savićević	(Netherlands) Marc Overmars (Liberia) George Weah
1999	(Germany) Oliver Kahn	(Brazil) Roberto Carlos (Netherlands) Jaap Stam (France) Lilian Thuram	(Brazil) Rivaldo (Argentina) Juan Sebastián Verón (Portugal) Luís Figo (England) David Beckham	(Italy) Christian Vieri (Ukraine) Andriy Shevchenko (Argentina) Gabriel Batistuta

== See also ==
- Onze Mondial European Footballer of the Year
- World Soccer Player of the Year
- The Guardian 100 Best Male Footballers in the World
- FourFourTwo Player of the Year Award
- FIFA World Player of the Year
- ESM Team of the Season
