= Trofeo Aldo Rovira =

Association football trophy

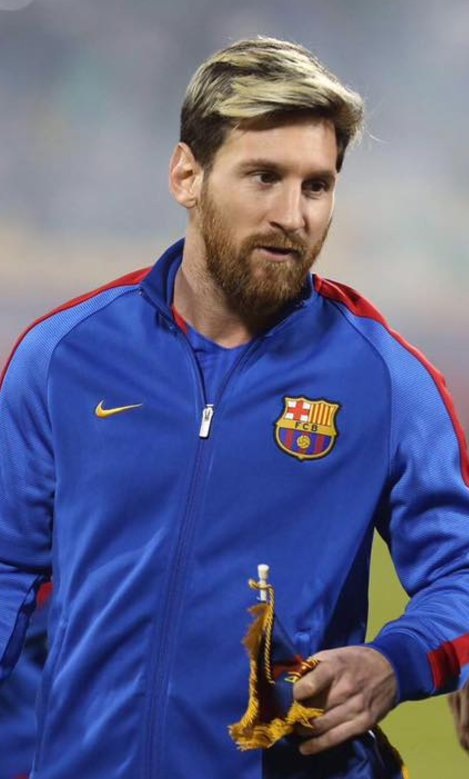
Lionel Messi has won the award a record 6 times.

The Memorial Aldo Rovira Award (Catalan: Premi Memorial Aldo Rovira) is a trophy awarded by FC Barcelona to its best players (men's and women's football team) of the season and it is decided by a jury composed of board of directors and heads of sport in Catalan media. The award was created in 2010 in memory of the son of former FC Barcelona director, Josep Lluis Rovira, who died in a traffic accident one year earlier.

Lionel Messi won the inaugural prize for the season held in 2009–10 and he has also won the award on a record six occasions.

== Key ==
- † denotes a player registered with Barcelona in the 2026–27 season
- Player (X) denotes the number of times a player has won the award

== Winners ==
Season	Player	Position	Nationality	Ref
2009–10	Lionel Messi	Forward	Argentina	
2010–11	Lionel Messi (2)	Forward	Argentina	
2011–12	Eric Abidal	Defender	France	
2012–13	Lionel Messi (3)	Forward	Argentina	
2013–14	Javier Mascherano	Midfielder	Argentina	
2014–15	Lionel Messi (4)	Forward	Argentina	
2015–16	Luis Suárez	Forward	Uruguay	
2016–17	Lionel Messi (5)	Forward	Argentina	
2017–18	Lionel Messi (6)	Forward	Argentina	
2018–19	Gerard Piqué	Defender	Spain	
2019–20	Marc-André ter Stegen	Goalkeeper	Germany	
2020–21	Pedri †	Midfielder	Spain	
2021–22	Gavi †	Midfielder	Spain	
2022–23	Marc-André ter Stegen (2)	Goalkeeper	Germany	
2023–24	Lamine Yamal †	Forward	Spain	
2024–25	Lamine Yamal (2) †	Forward	Spain	
2025–26	Pau Cubarsí †	Defender	Spain	

== Statistics ==
=== Wins by playing position ===
Position	Players	Total
Goalkeeper	1	2
Defender	3	3
Midfielder	3	3
Forward	3	9

=== Wins by nationality ===
Nationality	Players	Total
Argentina	2	7
Spain	5	6
Germany	1	2
France	1	1
Uruguay	1	1

== Women's Premi Aldo Rovira ==
Season	Player	Position	Nationality	Ref
2020–21	Alexia Putellas	Midfielder	Spain	
2021–22	Alexia Putellas (2)	Midfielder	Spain	
2022–23	Aitana Bonmatí†	Midfielder	Spain	
2023–24	Aitana Bonmatí (2) †	Midfielder	Spain	
2024–25	Clàudia Pina †	Forward	Spain	
2025–26	Patricia Guijarro †	Midfielder	Spain	

== See also ==
- Joan Gamper Trophy
- Premi Barça Jugadors
- Trofeo Alfredo Di Stéfano
- Don Balón
- Trofeo EFE
- LFP Awards
