= Rommel Fernández =

Panamanian footballer (1966-1993)

Personal information
- Full name: Rommel Fernández Gutiérrez
- Date of birth: 15 January 1966
- Place of birth: El Chorrillo, Panama
- Date of death: 6 May 1993 (aged 27)
- Place of death: Albacete, Spain
- Height: 1.85 m (6 ft 1 in)
- Position: Striker

Youth career
- Plaza Amador
- Atlético Panamá

Senior career*
Years	Team	Apps	(Gls)
1985–1987	Alianza		
1987–1991	Tenerife	123	(47)
1991–1993	Valencia	21	(2)
1992–1993	→ Albacete (loan)	18	(7)

International career
1986–1992	Panama		
- * Club domestic league appearances and goals

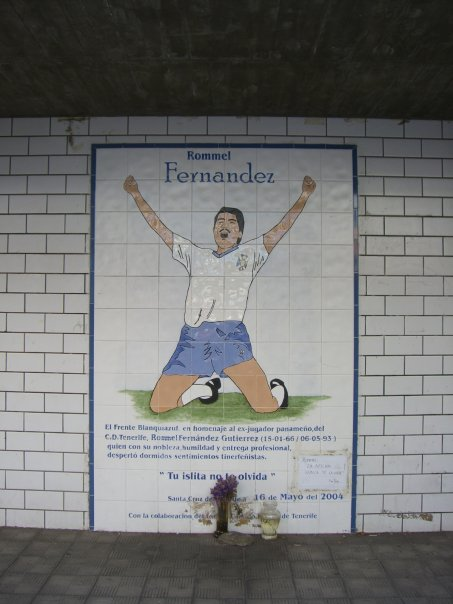
Memorial for Fernández in Estadio Heliodoro Rodríguez, Tenerife, Spain

Rommel Fernández Gutiérrez (15 January 1966 – 6 May 1993) was a Panamanian footballer who played as a striker.

The second Panamanian to play in Europe, he spent the best years of his career in Spain, amassing La Liga totals of 104 games and 32 goals – 162/56 both major levels combined – in representation of four teams. In 1993, he died in a car accident, at the age of just 27.

== Club career ==
Fernández was born in the Panama City neighborhood of El Chorrillo. In 1987, the 21-year-old signed for CD Tenerife in Spain from Alianza, scoring a career-best 18 goals in his second season as the Canary Islands side was promoted to La Liga for the second time in its history; in the following years he also netted in double digits as the club retained its top division status – in the 1989–90 campaign he was named Best South American Player (sic) in the Spanish League and, the following year, was voted best Ibero-American player in the competition by news agency EFE, receiving the Trofeo EFE.

Nicknamed "El Panzer" for his namesake and goalscoring prowess alike, Fernández moved to Valencia CF in 1991, but was used mostly as a backup in his only season, scoring just two goals. Subsequently he joined Albacete Balompié on loan, helping the Castilla–La Mancha team retain its first division status in its second season ever and scoring his 50th league goal in the process, against former club Tenerife.

== International career ==
Fernández represented Panama numerous times, making his debut in the late 80's. In 1986, during a trip with the national team to Spain to participate in the Mundialito de la Emigración, a tournament where Tenerife played a select squad of players with Spanish ancestry, he played well enough to be offered a contract by the hosts.

Fernández's last match with Panama was a 1–5 defeat in Costa Rica for the 1994 FIFA World Cup qualifiers, on 23 August 1992.

== Death ==
On 6 May 1993, after returning from a meal with his Albacete teammates, Fernández died in a car accident just outside Albacete, after losing control of his car and hitting his head on a tree. His cousin Ronny Rojo was also travelling with him, but emerged unharmed.

== Legacy ==
Estadio Revolución was renamed Estadio Rommel Fernández, in Fernández's honour.
