= Trofeo EFE =

Football award

Trofeo EFE is an annual football award given by the EFE news agency since the 1990–91 season to the best Ibero-American player in Spanish football. Recipients are selected based on assessments from the agency's sports editors.

The inaugural winner was Rommel Fernández from Panama. Chilean Iván Zamorano and Brazilian Ronaldo Nazário have won the award twice. In 2000, the Argentinian Fernando Redondo received a special distinction as the best player of the 1990s decade. In the 2017–18 season, the award expanded beyond Spain, with Uruguayan Edinson Cavani becoming the first player outside the Spanish La Liga to win the award, doing so with French Ligue 1 side Paris Saint-Germain. In the 2018–19 season, the award was not given, and in 2019–20 it was won by a woman for the first time ever, Colombian midfielder Leicy Santos.

Lionel Messi has won the award a record five times, more than any other player.

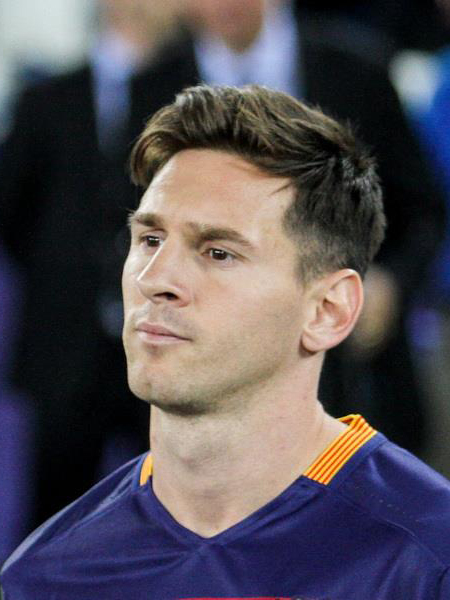
Lionel Messi is the award's record holder with five wins, four of which came consecutively.

== Winners ==
Season	Player	Club
1990–91	(Panama) Rommel Fernández	Tenerife
1991–92	(Uruguay) José Zalazar	Albacete
1992–93	(Chile) Iván Zamorano	Real Madrid
1993–94	(Brazil) Romário	Barcelona
1994–95	(Chile) Iván Zamorano	Real Madrid
1995–96	(Argentina) Diego Simeone	Atlético Madrid
1996–97	(Brazil) Ronaldo	Barcelona
1997–98	(Brazil) Roberto Carlos	Real Madrid
1998–99	(Brazil) Rivaldo	Barcelona
1999–2000	(Argentina) Martín Herrera	Alavés
2000–01	(Paraguay) Roberto Acuña	Zaragoza
2001–02	(Argentina) Javier Saviola	Barcelona
2002–03	(Brazil) Ronaldo	Real Madrid
2003–04	(Brazil) Ronaldinho	Barcelona
2004–05	(Uruguay) Diego Forlán	Villarreal
2005–06	(Argentina) Pablo Aimar	Valencia
2006–07	(Argentina) Lionel Messi	Barcelona
2007–08	(Argentina) Sergio Agüero	Atlético Madrid
2008–09	(Argentina) Lionel Messi	Barcelona
2009–10	(Argentina) Lionel Messi	Barcelona
2010–11	(Argentina) Lionel Messi	Barcelona
2011–12	(Argentina) Lionel Messi	Barcelona
2012–13	(Portugal) Cristiano Ronaldo	Real Madrid
2013–14	(Brazil) Diego Costa	Atlético Madrid
2014–15	(Uruguay) Luis Suárez	Barcelona
2015–16	(Costa Rica) Keylor Navas	Real Madrid
2016–17	(Spain) Real Madrid	Special edition
2017–18	(Uruguay) Edinson Cavani	Paris Saint-Germain
2018–19	Not awarded	–
2019–20	(Brazil) Casemiro (Men) (Colombia) Leicy Santos (Women)	Real Madrid; Atlético Madrid
2020–21	(Uruguay) Luis Suárez	Atlético Madrid
2021–22	(Brazil) Vinícius Júnior	Real Madrid
2022–23	(Brazil) Vinícius Júnior	Real Madrid
2023–24	(Brazil) Vinícius Júnior	Real Madrid
2024–25	(Colombia) Linda Caicedo	Real Madrid

== Wins by player ==
Player	Wins
(Argentina) Lionel Messi	5
(Brazil) Vinícius Júnior	3
(Chile) Iván Zamorano	2
(Brazil) Ronaldo	2
(Uruguay) Luis Suárez	2

== See also ==
- LFP Awards
- Don Balón
- Trofeo Alfredo Di Stéfano
- Trofeo Aldo Rovira
- FIFA World Player of the Year
- European Footballer of the Year
- European Golden Boot
- Onze Mondial European Footballer of the Year
- World Soccer Player of the Year
