= Trofeo Alfredo Di Stéfano =

Trophy awarded to the best La Liga footballer

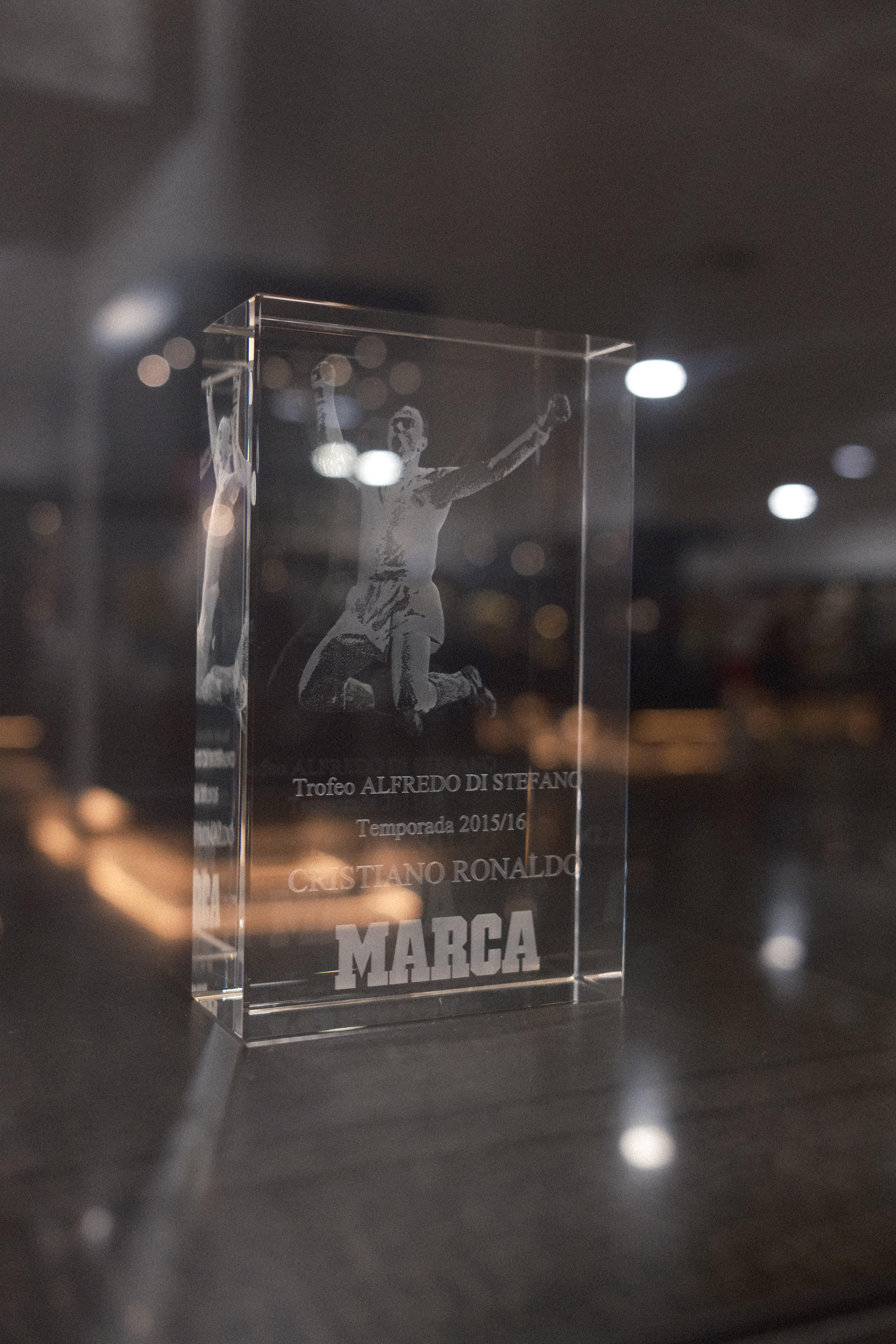
Trofeo Alfredo Di Stéfano

The Alfredo Di Stéfano Trophy (Spanish: Trofeo Alfredo Di Stéfano) was an annual association football award presented by Spanish sports newspaper Marca to the best footballer of La Liga. The award is named after former Real Madrid player Alfredo Di Stéfano. The first edition was awarded in the 2007–08 season Lionel Messi holds the record for the number of wins, with seven.

== Winners ==
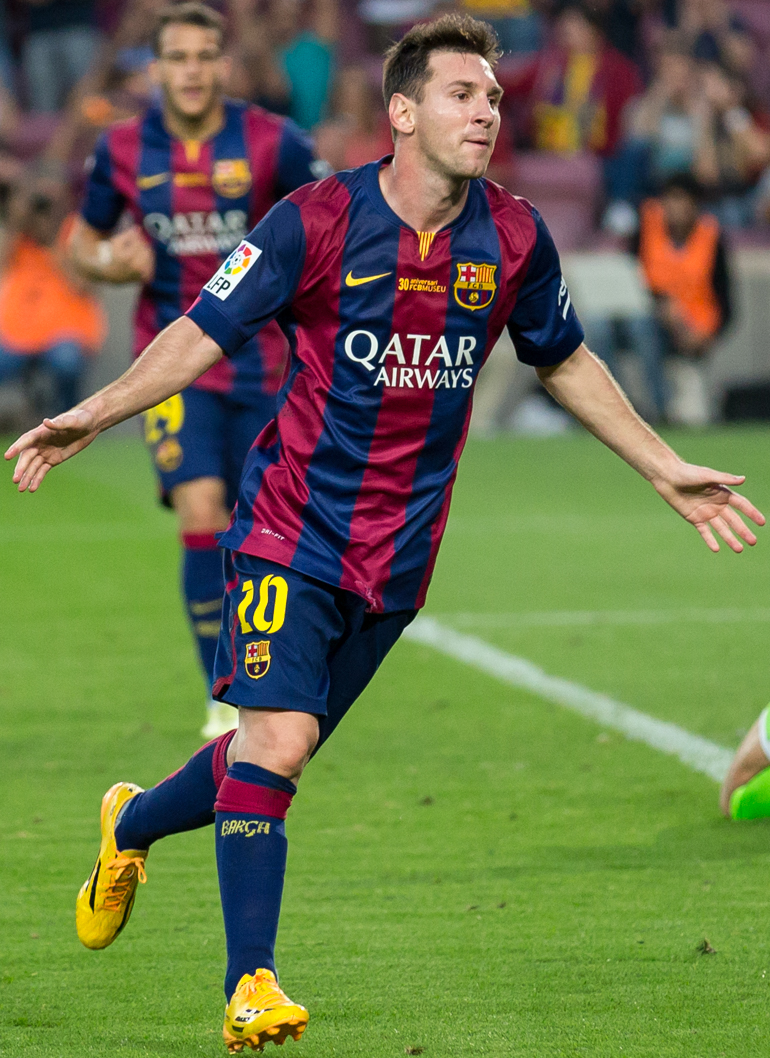
Lionel Messi has won the award a record seven times.

Season	Rank	Player	Club
2007–08; Details
2007–08; Details	1st	(Spain) Raúl	Real Madrid
2007–08; Details	2nd	(Argentina) Sergio Agüero	Atlético Madrid
2007–08; Details	3rd	(Spain) Iker Casillas	Real Madrid
2008–09; Details
2008–09; Details	1st	(Argentina) Lionel Messi	Barcelona
2008–09; Details	2nd	(Spain) Andrés Iniesta	Barcelona
2008–09; Details	3rd	(Uruguay) Diego Forlán	Atlético Madrid
2009–10; Details
2009–10; Details	1st	(Argentina) Lionel Messi	Barcelona
2009–10; Details	2nd	(Spain) Xavi	Barcelona
2009–10; Details	3rd	(Portugal) Cristiano Ronaldo	Real Madrid
2010–11; Details
2010–11; Details	1st	(Argentina) Lionel Messi	Barcelona
2010–11; Details	2nd	(Portugal) Cristiano Ronaldo	Real Madrid
2010–11; Details	3rd	(Spain) Xavi	Barcelona
2011–12; Details
2011–12; Details	1st	(Portugal) Cristiano Ronaldo	Real Madrid
2011–12; Details	2nd	(Argentina) Lionel Messi	Barcelona
2011–12; Details	3rd	(Spain) Andrés Iniesta	Barcelona
2012–13; Details
2012–13; Details	1st	(Portugal) Cristiano Ronaldo	Real Madrid
2012–13; Details	2nd	(Argentina) Lionel Messi	Barcelona
2012–13; Details	3rd	(Spain) Andrés Iniesta	Barcelona
2013–14; Details
2013–14; Details	1st	(Portugal) Cristiano Ronaldo	Real Madrid
2013–14; Details	2nd	(Spain) Diego Costa	Atlético Madrid
2013–14; Details	3rd	(Argentina) Lionel Messi	Barcelona
2014–15; Details
2014–15; Details	1st	(Argentina) Lionel Messi	Barcelona
2014–15; Details	2nd	(Portugal) Cristiano Ronaldo	Real Madrid
2014–15; Details	3rd	(Brazil) Neymar	Barcelona
2015–16; Details
2015–16; Details	1st	(Portugal) Cristiano Ronaldo	Real Madrid
2015–16; Details	2nd	(Uruguay) Luis Suárez	Barcelona
2015–16; Details	3rd	(France) Antoine Griezmann	Atlético Madrid
2016–17; Details
2016–17; Details	1st	(Argentina) Lionel Messi	Barcelona
2016–17; Details	2nd	(Portugal) Cristiano Ronaldo	Real Madrid
2016–17; Details	3rd	—	
2017–18; Details
2017–18; Details	1st	(Argentina) Lionel Messi	Barcelona
2017–18; Details	2nd	(Portugal) Cristiano Ronaldo	Real Madrid
2017–18; Details	3rd	—	
2018–19; Details
2018–19; Details	1st	(Argentina) Lionel Messi	Barcelona
2018–19; Details	2nd	(Uruguay) Luis Suárez	Barcelona
2018–19; Details	3rd	—	
2019–20; Details
2019–20; Details	1st	(France) Karim Benzema	Real Madrid
2019–20; Details	2nd	—	
2019–20; Details	3rd	—	
2020–21; Details
2020–21; Details	1st	(Uruguay) Luis Suárez	Atlético Madrid
2020–21; Details	2nd	—	
2020–21; Details	3rd	—	
2021–22; Details
2021–22; Details	1st	(France) Karim Benzema	Real Madrid
2021–22; Details	2nd	—	
2021–22; Details	3rd	—	
2022–23; Details
2022–23; Details	1st	(Germany) Marc-André ter Stegen	Barcelona
2022–23; Details	2nd	—	
2022–23; Details	3rd	—	
2023–24; Details
2023–24; Details	1st	(England) Jude Bellingham	Real Madrid
2023–24; Details	2nd	—	
2023–24; Details	3rd	—	
2024–25; Details
2024–25; Details	1st	(Spain) Lamine Yamal	Barcelona
2024–25; Details	2nd	—	
2024–25; Details	3rd	—	

== Wins by player ==
Player	Wins
Lionel Messi	7
Cristiano Ronaldo	4
Karim Benzema	2
Raúl	1
Luis Suárez	1
Marc-André ter Stegen	1
Jude Bellingham	1
Lamine Yamal	1

== See also ==
- Trofeo EFE
- Don Balón Award
- Pichichi Trophy
- Zarra Trophy
- Ricardo Zamora Trophy
- Miguel Muñoz Trophy
