= The Guardian 100 Best Male Footballers in the World =

UK newspaper's annual list

The Guardian 100 Best Male Footballers in the World is a list of the current best male footballers published annually by the British newspaper The Guardian. From its inception to 2017, it was known as The Guardian 100 Best Footballers in the World. It is decided by a panel of experts from several nations. Argentine player Lionel Messi is the record winner of the award with 6 wins.

== Winners ==
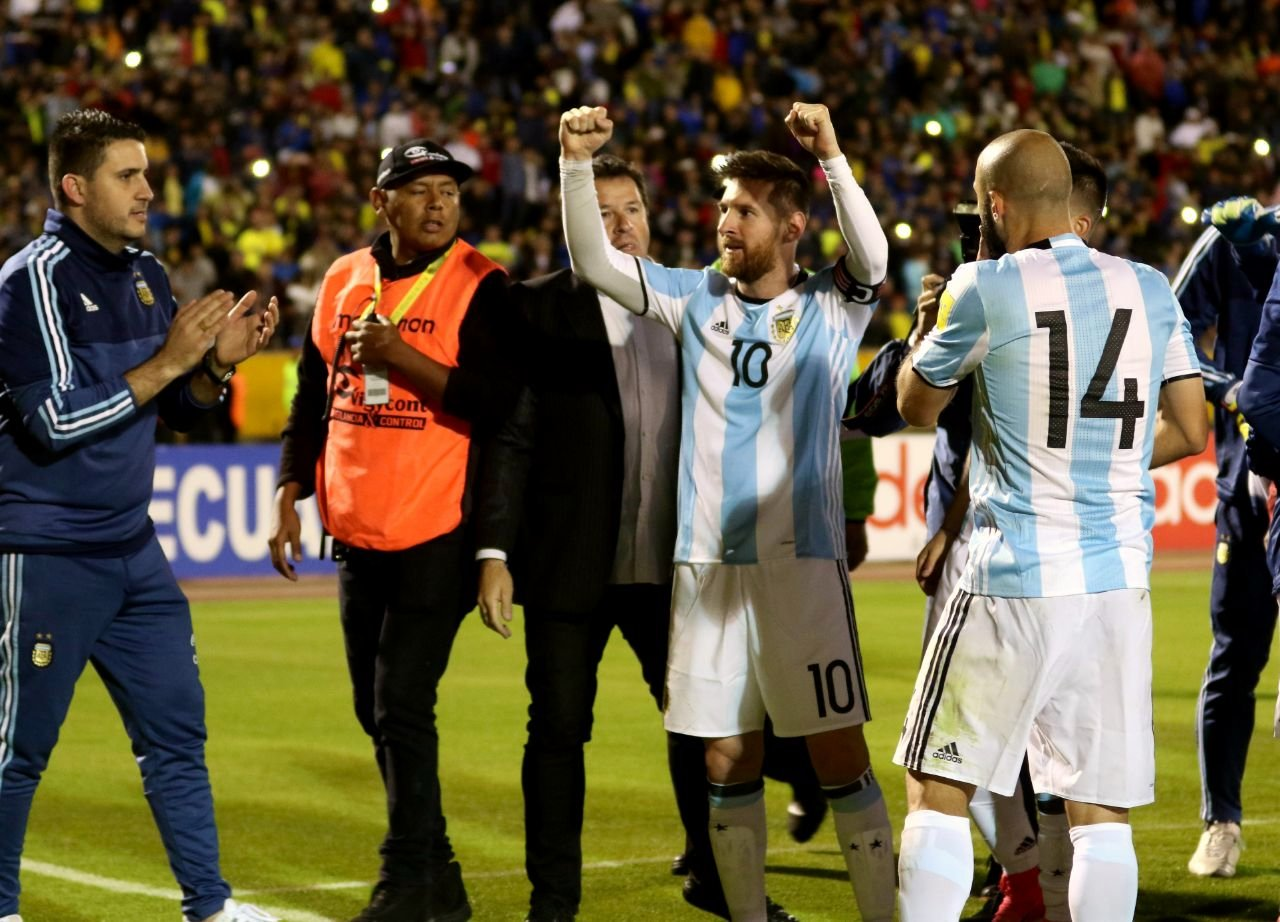
Argentine legend Lionel Messi has won the award a record 6 times overall.

Year	Player	Club
2012	(Argentina) Lionel Messi	(Spain) Barcelona
2013	(Argentina) Lionel Messi (2)	(Spain) Barcelona
2014	(Portugal) Cristiano Ronaldo	(Spain) Real Madrid
2015	(Argentina) Lionel Messi (3)	(Spain) Barcelona
2016	(Portugal) Cristiano Ronaldo (2)	(Spain) Real Madrid
2017	(Argentina) Lionel Messi (4)	(Spain) Barcelona
2018	(Croatia) Luka Modrić	(Spain) Real Madrid
2019	(Argentina) Lionel Messi (5)	(Spain) Barcelona
2020	(Poland) Robert Lewandowski	(Germany) Bayern Munich
2021	(Poland) Robert Lewandowski (2)	(Germany) Bayern Munich
2022	(Argentina) Lionel Messi (6)	(France) Paris Saint-Germain
2023	(Norway) Erling Haaland	(England) Manchester City
2024	(Spain) Rodri	(England) Manchester City
2025	(France) Ousmane Dembélé	(France) Paris Saint-Germain

== Wins by player ==
Player	Wins
(Argentina) Lionel Messi	6
(Portugal) Cristiano Ronaldo	2
(Poland) Robert Lewandowski	2
(Norway) Erling Haaland	1
(Croatia) Luka Modrić	1
(Spain) Rodri	1
(France) Ousmane Dembélé	1

== See also ==
- The Guardian Footballer of the Year
- World Soccer Player of the Year
- Onze Mondial European Footballer of the Year
- FourFourTwo Player of the Year Award
- El País King of European Soccer
- ESM Team of the Season
