= 90min =

News platform

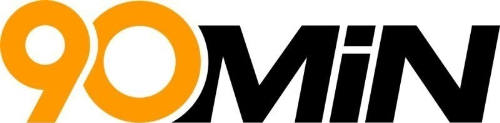
- Available in: English; German; Spanish; Italian; French; Turkish; Portuguese; Vietnamese; Thai; Indonesian
- Predecessor: FTBpro.com
- Headquarters: London, United Kingdom
- Country of origin: Israel
- Area served: Worldwide
- Founders: Yuval Larom; Asaf Peled; Gilad Beiman
- CEO: Asaf Peled
- Services: Sports news
- Website: 90min.com, 90min.tr
- Launched: 2011
- Current status: Active

90min is a technology-enabled football news platform, which produces Internet content covering various football leagues. The content offered by the platform is user-generated following the principles of citizen journalism. The first London based company website was launched in 2011 as FTBpro.com by Israeli entrepreneurs Yuval Larom, Asaf Peled, and Gilad Beiman, a group which operates today as Minute Media.

== History ==
90min was founded in late 2011, as FTBpro, by Yuval Langdon, Asaf Peled, Gilad Beiman. Prior to 90min, Peled worked for Cisco Systems for four years, while Beiman was among the founders of the Israeli Web portal Tapuz. The initial idea for the website came as the founders, all of them football fans, noticed that there was little investment in football-related start-ups. Shortly after its establishment the company raised $300,000 by angel investors including Shahar Erez and Boaz Dinte. In a second funding round in 2012 the company managed to raise $5.8 million from Battery Ventures and Gemini Israel Ventures, stating that the funding would be used for the geographic expansion of the company.

Another $18 million were raised in 2014 by former investors Battery Ventures and Gemini Israel Ventures, as well as new investors including UK-based Dawn Capital. The funding was to be used for expansion to new markets, for the opening of new offices in Southeast Asia, and for the enrichment of the site's video and mobile content. Approaching the end of 2014 the website was renamed from FTBpro to 90min. The last funding round ended in October 2015, and it raised a total of $15 million. The round was led by German media company ProSiebenSat.1 Media, an investment that aimed toward the establishment of a joint venture targeting the German football market, also receiving funds from previous investors. As of 2016, 90min was a subsidiary of Minute Media, along with other brands such as FanSided, 12Up, and Mental Floss. Minute Media, a technology and content company, entered into a joint venture with India's HT Media, in July 2016. The partnership launched 90min in India, for football fans in South Asia. In October 2017, 90min struck a deal with Sports Illustrated to provide video content for the latter's Planet Fútbol platform. The Spanish-language version of the platform, Planeta Fútbol, was also included in the agreement. 90min also partnered with the platform SportsHero to provide football-related content.

== Services ==
90min has developed and provides an online platform that shares football related content for desktop and mobile devices, using video, text, listicles, slideshows, social round-ups and interactive polls as elements to create its articles. There is content creation on the platform in 11 different languages, namely English, German, Spanish, Italian, French, Turkish, Portuguese, Vietnamese, Thai, and Indonesian. The platform also allows football clubs to publish content from 90min on their websites.

Content is created by a professional team of editors and journalists throughout Europe, the United States, Asia, and Latin America. 90min editorial staff members are located in offices in London, Tel Aviv, New York City, Manila, and São Paulo. As of 2016, 90min accumulates an average of over 50 million monthly visitors to its website and generates revenue via online advertising, with its clientele including the likes of Nike, Kia Motors, and Heineken.

90min announced a new podcast called "Football Americana" in October 2021. Football Americana is hosted by former American professional soccer player, Yael Averbuch West.
