= Bruce Bennett (disambiguation) =

Bruce Bennett (1906–2007) was an American actor and athlete.

Bruce Bennett may also refer to:

- Bruce Bennett (academic) (1941–2012), Australian academic
- Bruce Bennett (Canadian football) (1943–2021), American player of Canadian football
- Bruce Bennett (photographer) (born 1955), American photographer
- Bruce Bennett (politician) (1917–1979), American attorney and politician
