= Steve Reyes =

American photographer

Steve Reyes (born 1948) is an American photographer and storyteller from Oakland, California. Reyes has been included in Don Garlits' International Drag Racing Hall of Fame (2002), NHRA California Hot Rod Reunion Honorees (2009), and the East Coast Drag Times Hall of Fame (2011).

Reyes' photography career has primarily focused on automotive sports, but he has also photographed Major League Baseball, National Hockey League, skateboarding and CB radios. He has authored nine automotive photography books which cover his nearly 50-year career.

Reyes is currently retired. He continues to write books and online articles from his home in Florida.

== Career ==
=== Automotive (1963–2008) ===
Reyes attended his first race at Fremont Dragstrip in 1963 with his 8mm movie camera and Kodak 620 Brownie. At the age of fifteen became the track photographer after shooting photos from the grandstands. He would hitchhike with racers to attend races on the West Coast or stencil the letters on driver's cars for rides. Drag News would frequently ask Reyes to cover events since he would get the photos to them quickly. Reyes' first major publication came in 1966, when his photos were picked up by Mike Doherty's Drag Racing Almanac. The following year, he had more photos featured than any other racing photographer on the circuit.

Reyes became NHRA's Pacific (Division 7) photographer in 1969, primarily freelancing for the next four years. In 1970, he moved from Oakland to Los Angeles to be closer to his clients and within three years became the photographic editor for 12-plus magazine titles for Argus Publishing Corp (1973-1994). During his time at Argus, Reyes supplied photographs for titles such as Popular Hot Rodding, Super Chevy, and 1001 Custom and Rod Ideas. He also covered NHRA, AHRA, and IHRA races, in addition to World of Outlaws, street rod events, sprint cars, monster trucks, motorbikes, mud racing, and sand racing.

Reyes is responsible for many iconic photographs of drag racing and stunt driver legends, including Raymond Beadle, Gene Snow, Tony Nancy Wedge, Jeb Allen, Tom McEwen (drag racer), Don Garlits, Bob Glidden, Joe Amato, Don Prudhomme, Shirley Muldowney, and Jim Liberman. Reyes' photos of Evel Knievel's 1974 jump at Snake River Canyon were displayed as part of a special exhibit at the Smithsonian Institution.

Over his career, Reyes was responsible for over 300 magazine covers. During one month in 1973, Reyes shot 7 of 11 covers of car magazines on the newsstand. Reyes has photographed races in all 50 US States, Canada, Great Britain, Australia, New Zealand, and Japan. He has covered events in over 109 dragstrips worldwide, including the last drag race ever held at Lions Dragstrip. While primarily noted for his action shots and crashes at the races, he also has an extensive collection of doorslammers run by local drivers. Reyes utilized a variety of locations for formal shoots, including Lion Country Safari, Long Beach Harbor, fast-food locations, Saguaro National Park, Six Flags, the National Mall, and El Centro

Reyes' photographs have been featured extensively in magazines, books, movies, and as the artwork for ACME Diecast., Mattel, MPC, Playing Mantis / Johnny Lightning, and Revell die cast and model car kits

=== Baseball (1981–1985) ===
In 1981, Reyes was given an assignment through his job at Argus Publishing Corp. to shoot the car collection of Reggie Jackson from the New York Yankees. Through Jackson's influence, Reyes was given access to many Major League Baseball franchises, and would shoot weekday games. He was the only photographer who had shot all 117 of Jackson's cars. Reyes has photographs included at the Pro Baseball Hall of Fame in Cooperstown, New York.

=== Hockey (1991–1995) ===
During the early 1990s, Reyes photographed several hockey teams for NY's Bruce Bennett Studios, including the Los Angeles Kings, the Mighty Ducks of Anaheim and the Peoria Rivermen. Notable players included Wayne Gretzky, Brendan Shanahan, and Curtis Joseph.

== Bibliography ==
=== Author ===
1. Fabulous Funny Cars: A Pictorial History of the World's Fastest Automobiles (1994)
2. Quarter Mile Chaos: Images of Drag Racing Mayhem (2006)
3. Funny Car Fever: The Birth of Drag Racing's Wildest Class (2007)
4. Slingshot Spectacular: The Front-Engine Dragster Era (2007)
5. Fuel Altereds Forever (2008)
6. Blood, Sweat, and Nitro (2010)
7. Funny Car Follies (2010)
8. The Dawn of ProStock: Drag Racing's Fastest Doorslammers (2013)
9. Top Fuel Dragsters: Drag Racing's Rear Engine Revolution (2016)

=== Magazines ===
Unless otherwise noted, all magazine references are listed here.

- 1001 Truck and Van Ideas
- All American Drags
- Car Craft
- Cars
- Drag Digest
- Drag News
- Drag Racing Almanac
- Drag Racing USA
- Drag Strip
- Drag World
- Esquire
- Gasser Wars
- Hemmings Muscle Car
- Hot Rod
- Hot Rodding in Action
- National Dragster
- Off Road
- Penthouse
- Popular Cycling
- Popular Hot Rodding
- Super Chevy
- Super Stock
- Vintage Motorsports

=== Cover photos ===
- Focus on Sports:Photographing Action (1975)
- Petersen's History of Drag Racing (1981)
- Big-Block Chevy Performance (1995)
- Spirit Engine (2008)
- Six Seconds to Glory (2013)

=== Other contributions ===
- 1966 Drag Racing Almanac (1966)
- The Sox & Martin book of drag racing (1974)
- High performance : the culture and technology of drag racing, 1950-1990 (1994)
- The Race Car Chassis (1997)
- Stories of triumph: women who win in sport and in life (1998)
- Nor Cal Fuelers 1960's Video Scrapbook #1 (2006)
- Superfast cars (2006)
- Fuel & Guts (2007)
- Drag Racers (2008)
- Drag Racing's Exhibition Attractions (2008)
- Hurricane! (2008)
- Snake vs. Mongoose (2009)
- Hot Hot Rods (2011)
- The Tasca Ford Legacy (2014)
- Lost Drag Strips II (2016)
- "Dyno" Don (2018)
- Stardust International Raceway (2018)
- The American Speed Shop (2019)
- Chevy Drag Racing 1955-1980 (2020)
