= Maggie Koerth =

American science journalist

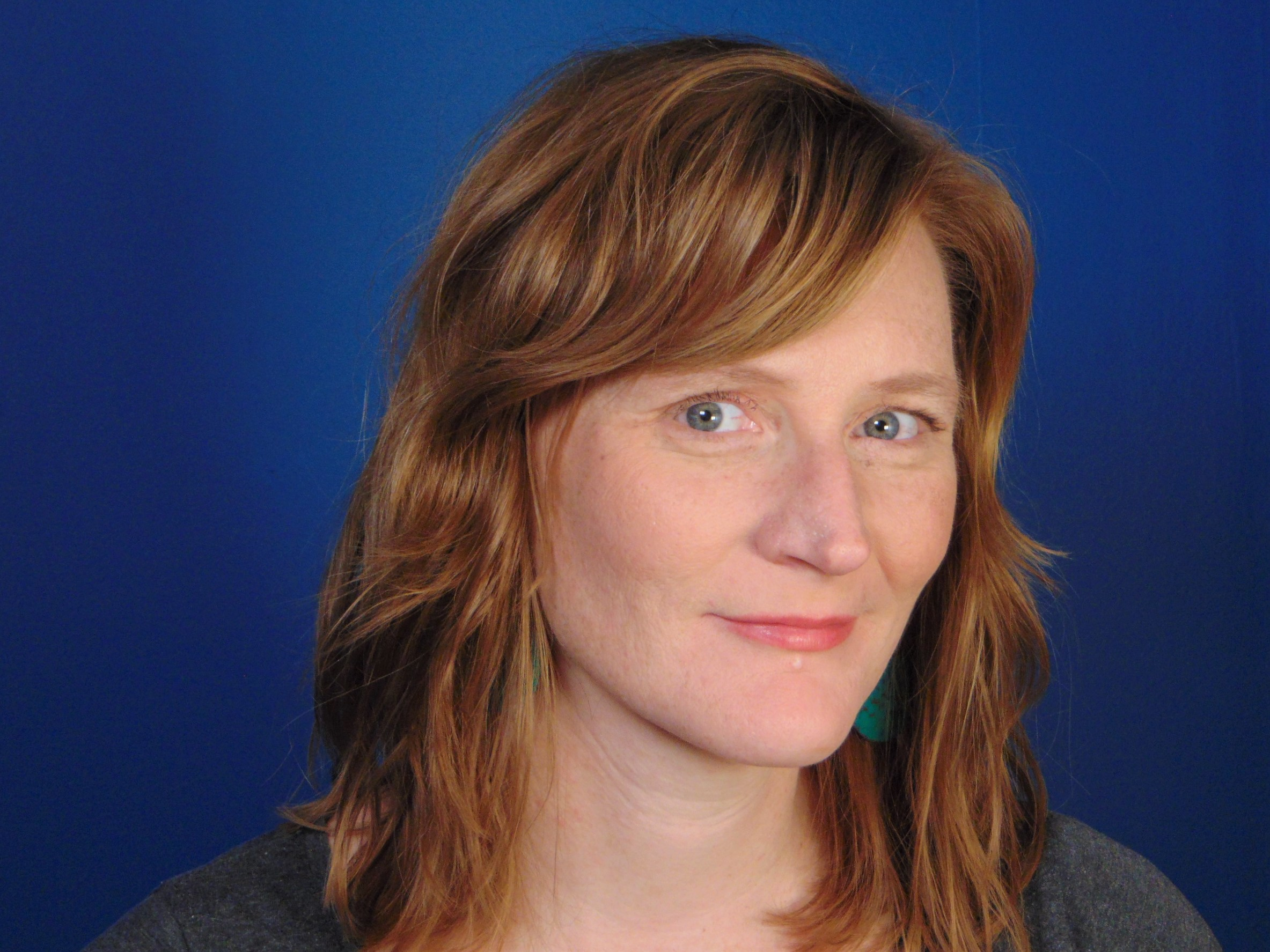
- Maggie Koerth, Nov 2021
- Born: 1981 (age 44–45); Kansas, U.S.
- Occupations: Author; Blogger
- Writing career
- Notable work: Before the Lights Go Out: Conquering the Energy Crisis Before It Conquers Us

Maggie Koerth (born 1981), formerly known as Maggie Koerth-Baker, is an American science journalist. She was a senior science editor at FiveThirtyEight and was previously a science editor at Boing Boing and a monthly columnist for The New York Times Magazine. Koerth is the author of the 2012 book Before the Lights Go Out: Conquering the Energy Crisis Before It Conquers Us.

== Background ==
Born in Kansas, Koerth lived in Minneapolis with her husband as of 2012. Koerth studied journalism and anthropology at the University of Kansas.

== Career ==
In 2009, Koerth co-authored the book Be Amazing: Glow in the Dark, Control the Weather, Perform Your Own Surgery, Get Out of Jury Duty, Identify a Witch, Colonize a Nation, Impress a Girl, Make a Zombie, Start Your Own Religion with Will Pearson and Mangesh Hattikudur, the co-founders of Mental Floss. The book was described as "a tongue-in-cheek self-improvement guide". Koerth was an assistant editor at Mental Floss.

She later joined Boing Boing, where she specialized in science blogging and was known for her ability to explain science coherently and understandably while keeping it interesting. A piece Koerth wrote for Boing Boing in the wake of the Fukushima Daiichi nuclear disaster explaining nuclear power plant operations was featured in the anthology The Best Science Writing Online 2012.

In June 2012, Koerth suffered a miscarriage. She wrote about her experiences with the social expectations and medical regulation surrounding abortions and miscarriage in a series of blog entries.

Beginning in August 2012, Koerth wrote "Eureka", a monthly column for The New York Times about research of interest to the layperson at the intersection of science, technology, and culture. She has also contributed to Discover, Popular Science, New Scientist, Scientific American, and National Geographic.

In 2012, Koerth published Before the Lights Go Out: Conquering the Energy Crisis Before It Conquers Us, a book about the complexity of energy systems in the United States, the roadblocks to change, and the possibility of doing things differently.

Koerth worked at FiveThirtyEight as a senior science editor from 2016 to 2023. As of 2025, she is a science and climate editor at CNN.

== Awards ==
In June 2014, Koerth was named one of two Nieman-Berkman Fellows in journalism innovation at Harvard University. In 2017, she won the American Meteorological Society's Award for Distinguished Science Journalism in the Atmospheric and Related Sciences.

Carl Zimmer has called her "one of the most innovative science writers at work today."
