= Sports Illustrated =

American sports magazine

- Issue cover dated January 4, 1960, honoring boxer Ingemar Johansson as Sportsman of the Year for 1959
- Co-editors in chief: Stephen Cannella; Ryan Hunt
- Staff writers: Staff Managing Editor SI.com: Stephen Cannella; Managing Editor SI Golf Group: Jim Gorant; Creative Director: Christopher Hercik; Director of Photography: Brad Smith; Senior Editor, Chief of Reporters: Richard Demak; Senior Editors: Mark Bechtel, Trisha Lucey Blackmar, MJ Day (Swimsuit); Mark Godich; Stefanie Kaufman (Operations); Kostya P. Kennedy, Diane Smith (Swimsuit); Senior Writers: Kelli Anderson, Lars Anderson, Chris Ballard, Michael Bamberger, George Dohrmann, David Epstein, Michael Farber, Damon Hack, Lee Jenkins, Peter King, Thomas Lake, Tim Layden, J. Austin Murphy, Dan Patrick, Joe Posnanski, S.L. Price, Selena Roberts, Alan Shipnuck, Phil Taylor, Ian Thomsen, Jim Trotter, Gary Van Sickle, Tom Verducci, Grant Wahl, L. Jon Wertheim; Associate Editors: Darcie Baum (Swimsuit); Mark Beech, Adam Duerson, Gene Menez, Elizabeth Newman, David Sabino (Statistics); Staff Writers: Brian Cazeneuve, Albert Chen, Chris Mannix, Ben Reiter, Melissa Segura; Deputy Chief of Reporters: Lawrence Mondi; Writer-Reporters: Sarah Kwak, Andrew Lawrence, Rick Lipsey, Julia Morrill, Rebecca Sun, Pablo S. Torre; Reporters: Kelvin C. Bias, Matt Gagne, Rebecca Shore
- Categories: Sports magazine
- Frequency: Monthly (2020–present); Biweekly (2018–20); Weekly (1954–2018)
- Publisher: Minute Media (brand licensee)
- Total circulation: 470,152 (2024)
- First issue: August 16, 1954; 72 years ago
- Company: Authentic Brands Group
- Country: United States
- Based in: New York City
- Language: English
- Website: si.com
- ISSN: 0038-822X
- OCLC: 1766364

Sports Illustrated (SI) is an American sports magazine first published in August 1954. Founded by Stuart Scheftel, it was the first magazine with a circulation of over one million to win the National Magazine Award for General Excellence twice. It is also known for its annual swimsuit issue, which has been published since 1964, and has spawned other complementary media works and products.

Owned until 2018 by Time Inc., it was sold to Authentic Brands Group (ABG) following the sale of Time Inc. to Meredith Corporation. The Arena Group (formerly theMaven, Inc.) was subsequently awarded a 10-year license to operate the Sports Illustrated–branded editorial operations, while ABG licenses the brand for other non-editorial ventures and products. In January 2024, The Arena Group missed a quarterly licensing payment, leading ABG to terminate the company's license. Arena, in turn, laid off the publication's editorial staff.

In March 2024, ABG licensed the publishing rights to Minute Media in a 10-year deal, jointly announcing that the print and digital editions would be revived by rehiring some of the editorial staff. On May 17, 2024, Sports Illustrated failed to deliver a print copy of the publication for the month to its subscribers for the first time in the magazine's 70-year history, according to the New York Post's Josh Kosman.

== History ==
=== Establishment ===
There were two previous magazines named Sports Illustrated before the current magazine was launched on August 9, 1954. In 1936, Stuart Scheftel created Sports Illustrated with a target market of sportsmen. He published the magazine monthly from 1936 to 1942. The magazine focused on golf, tennis, and skiing with articles on the major sports. He then sold the name to Dell Publications, which released Sports Illustrated in 1949 and this version lasted six issues before closing. Dell's version focused on major sports (baseball, basketball, boxing) and competed on magazine racks against Sports and other monthly sports magazines. During the 1940s, these magazines were monthly, which prevented them from covering current events. There was no large-base, general, weekly sports magazine with a national following on actual active events. It was then that Time patriarch Henry Luce began considering whether his company should attempt to fill that gap. At the time, many believed sports was beneath the attention of serious journalism and did not think sports news could fill a weekly magazine, especially during the winter. A number of advisers to Luce, including Life magazine's Ernest Havemann, tried to kill the idea, but Luce, who was not a sports fan, decided the time was right.

Luce and editors of the planned magazine met in 1954 at Pine Lakes Country Club, the oldest golf course in Myrtle Beach, South Carolina. The course's pro shop has a plaque mentioning the meetings, and the plaque also states that the first issue was given to the course. It is on display there. Myrtle Beach Area Golf Course Owners Association executive director Tracy Conner credits the magazine with making Myrtle Beach a golf destination.

Many at Time-Life scoffed at Luce's idea; in his Pulitzer Prize–winning biography, Luce and His Empire, W. A. Swanberg wrote that the company's intellectuals dubbed the proposed magazine "Muscle", "Jockstrap", and "Sweat Socks". Launched on August 9, 1954, it was not profitable (and would not be for 12 years) and not particularly well-run at first, but Luce's timing was good. The popularity of spectator sports in the United States was about to explode, and that popularity came to be driven largely by three things: economic prosperity, television, and Sports Illustrated.

The early issues of the magazine seemed caught between two opposing views of its audience. Much of the subject matter was directed at upper-class activities such as yachting, polo and safaris, but upscale would-be advertisers were unconvinced that sports fans were a significant part of their market.

=== Color printing ===
In 1965, offset printing began. This allowed the color pages of the magazine to be printed overnight, not only producing crisper and brighter images, but also finally enabling the editors to merge the best color with the latest news. By 1967, the magazine was printing 200 pages of "fast color" a year; in 1983, SI became the first American full-color newsweekly. An intense rivalry developed between photographers, particularly Walter Iooss and Neil Leifer, to get a decisive cover shot that would be on newsstands and in mailboxes only a few days later.

In the late 1970s and early 1980s, during Gilbert Rogin's term as Managing Editor, the feature stories of Frank Deford became the magazine's anchor. "Bonus pieces" on Pete Rozelle, Woody Hayes, Bear Bryant, Howard Cosell and others became some of the most quoted sources about these figures, and Deford established a reputation as one of the best writers of the time.

=== Expansion of sports coverage ===
After more than a decade of steady losses, the magazine's fortunes finally turned around in the 1960s when Andre Laguerre became its managing editor. A European correspondent for Time, Inc., who later became chief of the Time-Life news bureaux in Paris and London (for a time he ran both simultaneously), Laguerre attracted Henry Luce's attention in 1956 with his singular coverage of the Winter Olympic Games in Cortina d'Ampezzo, Italy, which became the core of SI's coverage of those games. In May 1956, Luce brought Laguerre to New York to become the assistant managing editor of the magazine. He was named managing editor in 1960, and he more than doubled the circulation by instituting a system of departmental editors, redesigning the internal format, and inaugurating the unprecedented use in a news magazine of full-color photographic coverage of the week's sports events. He was also one of the first to sense the rise of national interest in professional football.

Laguerre also instituted the innovative concept of one long story at the end of every issue, which he called the "bonus piece". These well-written, in-depth articles helped to distinguish Sports Illustrated from other sports publications, and helped launch the careers of such legendary writers as Frank Deford, who in March 2010 wrote of Laguerre, "He smoked cigars and drank Scotch and made the sun move across the heavens ... His genius as an editor was that he made you want to please him, but he wanted you to do that by writing in your own distinct way." Laguerre is also credited with the conception and creation of the annual Swimsuit Issue.

In 1984, Mark Mulvoy became the youngest managing editor in the magazine's history. He sought for Sports Illustrated "to be the conscience of sports" through investigative journalism. He established the Golf Plus insert for the older golfing audience, established Sports Illustrated Kids for a younger audience, and doubled the swimsuit issue to 40 pages. The swimsuit issue became an annual special edition, and profits for Sports Illustrated more than quadrupled. In 1986, co-owned property HBO/Cannon Video had inked a pact to produce video versions of the magazine for $20 on the sell-through market, running just 30–45 minutes on the tape. In 1990, Time Inc. merged with Warner Communications to form the media conglomerate Time Warner. Sports Illustrated acquired FanNation.com in 2007 to compete in the Web 2.0 market; the site aggregated sports news and allowed user-generated content. In 2014, Time Inc. was spun off from Time Warner.

=== Sale to Authentic Brands Group, Maven ===
In 2018, Meredith Corporation acquired parent company Time Inc. Meredith planned to sell Sports Illustrated due to not aligning with its lifestyle properties. Authentic Brands Group announced its intent to acquire Sports Illustrated for $110 million the next year, stating that it would leverage its brand and other assets for new opportunities that "stay close to the DNA and the heritage of the brand." Upon the announcement, Meredith would enter into a licensing agreement to continue as publisher of the Sports Illustrated editorial operations for at least the next two years. In June 2019, the rights to publish the Sports Illustrated editorial operations were licensed to the digital media company theMaven, Inc. under a 10-year contract, with Ross Levinsohn as CEO. The company had backed a bid by Junior Bridgeman to acquire SI. In preparation for the closure of the sale to ABG and Maven, The Wall Street Journal reported that there would be Sports Illustrated employee layoffs, which was confirmed after the acquisition had closed.

In October 2019, editor-in-chief Chris Stone stepped down. Later that month, Sports Illustrated announced its hiring of veteran college sports writer Pat Forde. In January 2020, it announced an editorial partnership with The Hockey News, focusing on syndication of NHL-related coverage. In 2021, it announced a similar partnership with Morning Read for golf coverage, with its website being merged into that of Sports Illustrated. It also partnered with iHeartMedia to distribute and co-produce podcasts.

In September 2021, Maven, now known as The Arena Group, acquired the New Jersey–based sports news website The Spun, which would integrate into Sports Illustrated. In 2022, ABG announced several non-editorial ventures involving the Sports Illustrated brand, including an apparel line for JCPenney "inspired by iconic moments in sports" (it was not the brand's first foray into clothing, as it launched a branded swimsuit line in conjunction with its Swimsuit Issue in 2018), and resort hotels in Orlando and Punta Cana. In September 2023, it expanded its resorts name licensing through a new partnership with Travel + Leisure.

On November 27, 2023, Futurism published an article alleging that Sports Illustrated was publishing AI-generated articles credited to authors who were also AI-generated; the latter practice apparently extended to their profile photos, which the website alleged were sourced from online marketplaces selling such photos. After Futurism reached out to The Arena Group, the magazine purportedly removed some of the implicated writers and republished their articles under other AI-generated authors with notes disclaiming its staff's involvement. In response to the report, a spokesperson for Sports Illustrated claimed that the affected articles were product reviews written without the involvement of AI by AdVon Commerce, a third-party company which they claimed used pseudonyms to "protect author privacy" and had already severed ties with; meanwhile, writers and editors at the magazine sharply criticized the alleged practices.

On January 5, 2024, The Arena Group missed a $3.75 million quarterly licensing payment to Authentic Brands Group. Two weeks later, on January 19, Authentic Brands Group terminated its licensing agreement. As a result, The Arena Group announced that it would lay off the entire Sports Illustrated staff. In March 2024, Authentic Brands Group licensed the publishing rights to Minute Media in a 10-year deal, jointly announcing that the print and digital editions would be revived by rehiring some of the editorial staff. Minute converted the Fan Nation-branded sites to "On SI". In August 2024, Minute Media and RTA Media Holdings (and RTA's brand Racing America) entered into a partnership, forming Racing America on SI. This partnership allows Racing America's coverage of NASCAR and grassroots racing to be presented to a wider audience through Sports Illustrated's platforms.

== Regular segments ==
- Who's Hot, Who's Not: a feature on who is on a roll and who is going to fold.
- Inside the NFL, MLB, NHL, NBA, College Football, College Basketball, NASCAR, Golf, Boxing, Horse Racing, Soccer, and Tennis (sports vary from issue to issue): a section where writers from each sport address the latest news and rumors in their respective fields.
- Faces in the Crowd: a section which honors talented amateur athletes and their accomplishments.
- The Point After: a back-page column featuring a rotation of SI writers as well as other contributors. Content varies from stories to opinion, focusing on both the world of sports and the role sports play in society.

== Awards ==
=== American Sportswear Designer Award (ASDA Awards) ===
In 1956, Sports Illustrated began presenting annual awards to fashion designers who had excelled in the field of sportswear/activewear. The first ASDAs of 1956, presented to Claire McCardell with a separate Designer of the Year award to Rudi Gernreich, were chosen following a vote of 200 American top retailers. The following year, the voting pool had increased to 400 fashion industry experts, including Dorothy Shaver and Stanley Marcus, when Sydney Wragge and Bill Atkinson received the awards. The Italian designer Emilio Pucci was the first non-American to receive the award in 1961. The awards were presented up until at least 1963, when Marc Bohan received the prize. Other winners include Jeanne S. Campbell, Bonnie Cashin, and Rose Marie Reid who formed the first all-women winning group in 1958.

=== Performer of the Year ===
Maya Moore of the WNBA's Minnesota Lynx was the inaugural winner of the award in 2017.

=== Sportsperson of the Year ===
Since 1954, Sports Illustrated has annually presented the Sportsperson of the Year award to "the athlete or team whose performance that year most embodies the spirit of sportsmanship and achievement." Roger Bannister won the first-ever Sportsman of the Year award thanks to his record-breaking time of 3:59.4 for a mile, the first-ever time a mile had been run under four minutes. Both men and women have won the award, originally called "Sportsman of the Year" and renamed "Sportswoman of the Year" or "Sportswomen of the Year" when applicable; it is currently known as "Sportsperson of the Year."

==== Recent winners ====
The 2017 award winners were Houston Texans defensive end J. J. Watt and Houston Astros second baseman Jose Altuve. Both athletes were recognized for their efforts in helping rebuild the city of Houston following Hurricane Harvey in addition to Altuve being a part of the Astros team that won the franchise's first World Series in 2017. The 2018 winners were the Golden State Warriors as a team for winning their third NBA Title in four years. The 2021 winner was Tom Brady for his Super Bowl LV win. The 2023 winner was Deion Sanders, coach of the Colorado Buffaloes football team.

=== Sportsman of the Century ===
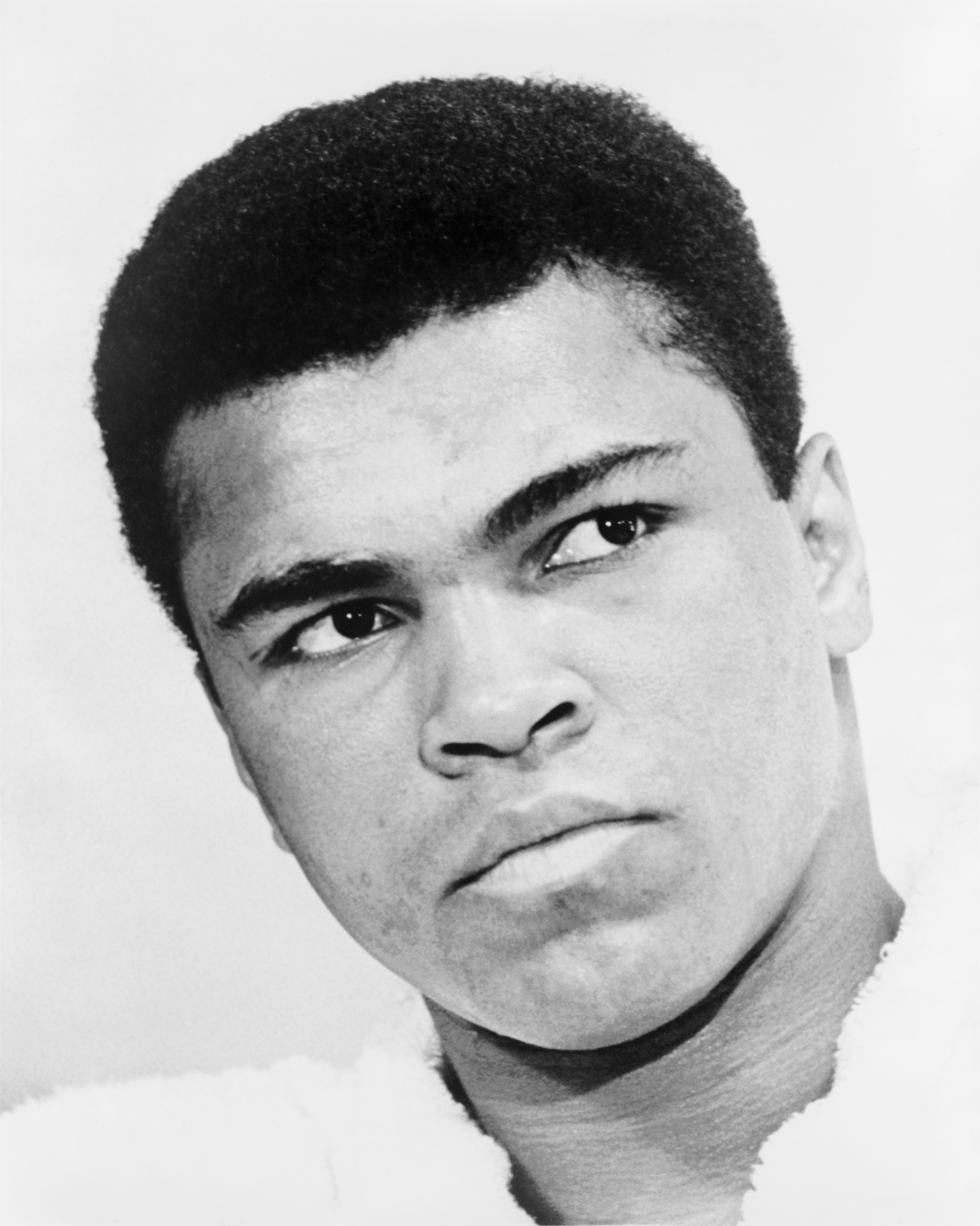
Sports Illustrated Sportsman of the Century Muhammad Ali

In 1999, Sports Illustrated named Muhammad Ali the Sportsman of the Century at the Sports Illustrated's 20th Century Sports Awards in New York City's Madison Square Garden.

=== Sports Illustrated's Muhammad Ali Legacy Award ===
In 2015, the magazine renamed its Sportsman Legacy Award to the Sports Illustrated's Muhammad Ali Legacy Award. The annual award was originally created in 2008 and honors former "sports figures who embody the ideals of sportsmanship, leadership and philanthropy as vehicles for changing the world." Ali first appeared on the magazine's cover in 1963 and went on to be featured on numerous covers during his storied career. His widow, Lonnie Ali, is consulted when choosing a recipient. In 2017, football quarterback Colin Kaepernick was honored with the Award, which was presented by Beyoncé. In 2018, WWE professional wrestler John Cena was honored with the award.

=== All-decade awards and honors ===
- Top 20 Female Athletes of the Decade (2009)
- Top 20 Male Athletes of the Decade (2009)
- All-Decade Team (2009) (MLB, NBA, NFL, NHL, college basketball, college football)
- Top 10 Coaches/Managers of the Decade (2009)
- Top 10 GMs/Executives of the Decade (2009)
- Top Team of the Decade (2009) (MLB, NBA, NFL, NHL, college basketball, college football)
- Top 25 Franchises of the Decade (2009)
- Major League Baseball honors
- National Basketball Association honors
- National Football League honors
- National Hockey League honors
- College basketball honors
- College football honors

=== Top sports colleges ===
For a 2002 list of the top 200 Division I sports colleges in the U.S., see footnote.

=== Wrestling ===
==== Male/Men's Wrestler of the Year ====
Year	1	2	3	4	5	6	7	8	9	10
2018	Cody Rhodes	Kenny Omega and Kota Ibushi	Seth Rollins	AJ Styles	Matt Riddle	Will Ospreay	Kazuchika Okada	Hiroshi Tanahashi	Johnny Gargano and Tommaso Ciampa	Daniel Bryan
2019	Jon Moxley	Adam Cole	Cody Rhodes	Kazuchika Okada and Seth Rollins	Chris Jericho	Kenny Omega	Kota Ibushi	Will Ospreay	Kofi Kingston	Nick Gage

==== Women's Wrestler of the Year ====
Year	1	2	3	4	5	6	7	8	9	10
2018	Sasha Banks	Charlotte Flair	Tessa Blanchard	Ronda Rousey	Asuka	Alexa Bliss	Toni Storm	Kairi Sane and Shayna Baszler	Bianca Belair	Jordynne Grace
2019	Becky Lynch	Tessa Blanchard	Charlotte Flair	Shayna Baszler	Taya Valkyrie	Kris Statlander	Rhea Ripley	Bayley and Sasha Banks	Jordynne Grace	Mercedes Martinez

==== Wrestler of the Year ====
Year	1	2	3	4	5	6	7	8	9	10
2017	Kenny Omega	AJ Styles	Roman Reigns	John Cena	Braun Strowman	Kazuchika Okada	Kevin Owens	Matt Riddle	Cody Rhodes	Keith Lee
2020	Sasha Banks	Jon Moxley	Drew McIntyre	Tetsuya Naito	Kenny Omega	Bayley	Io Shirai	Kota Ibushi	Roman Reigns	Eddie Kingston
2021	Roman Reigns	Kenny Omega	Bianca Belair	Shingo Takagi	Bryan Danielson	Big E	Dr. Britt Baker	Cody Rhodes	Josh Alexander	Jonathan Gresham
2022	Seth Rollins	Jon Moxley	Bianca Belair	Roman Reigns	Will Ospreay	Jamie Hayter	El Hijo del Vikingo	Dax Harwood	Cash Wheeler	Masha Slamovich
2023	Cody Rhodes	Rhea Ripley	MJF	Trinity	Will Ospreay	Seth Rollins	Tetsuya Naito	Swerve Strickland	Gunther	Becky Lynch

== Cover history ==
The magazine's cover is the basis of a sports myth, known as the Sports Illustrated cover jinx. Several athletes and other figures appeared many times on the magazine's cover.

Althea Gibson became the first woman on the cover on the September 2, 1957, issue.

=== Most covers by athlete, 1954–2016 ===
Athlete	Sport	Number of covers
Michael Jordan	Basketball	50
Muhammad Ali	Boxing	40
LeBron James	Basketball	25
Tiger Woods	Golf	24
Magic Johnson	Basketball	23
Kareem Abdul-Jabbar	Basketball	22
Wayne Gretzky	Hockey	22
Tom Brady	Football	20

=== Most covers by team, 1954 – May 2008 ===
Team	Sport	Number of covers
Los Angeles Lakers	Basketball	67
New York Yankees	Baseball	65
St. Louis Cardinals	Baseball	49
Dallas Cowboys	Football	48
Boston Red Sox	Baseball	46
Chicago Bulls	Basketball	45
Boston Celtics	Basketball	44
Los Angeles Dodgers	Baseball	40
Cincinnati Reds	Baseball	37
San Francisco 49ers	Football	33

=== Most covers by sport, 1954–2009 ===
Sport	Number of covers
Baseball-MLB	628
Pro Football-NFL	550
Pro Basketball-NBA	325
College Football	202
College Basketball	181
Golf	155
Boxing	134
Ice hockey	100
Track and Field	99
Tennis	78

=== Celebrities on the cover, 1954–2010 ===
Celebrity	Year	Special notes
Gary Cooper	1959	Scuba diving
Bob Hope	1963	Owner of Cleveland Indians
Shirley MacLaine	1964	Promoting the film John Goldfarb, Please Come Home!
Steve McQueen	1971	Riding a motorcycle
Burt Reynolds and Kris Kristofferson	1977	Promoting the film Semi-Tough
Big Bird	1977	On the cover with Mark Fidrych
Arnold Schwarzenegger	1987	Caption on cover was Softies
Chris Rock	2000	Wearing Los Angeles Dodgers hat
Stephen Colbert	2009	Caption: Stephen Colbert and his Nation save the Olympics
Mark Wahlberg and Christian Bale	2010	Promoting the film The Fighter
Brad Pitt	2011	Promoting the film Moneyball

=== Fathers and sons who have been featured on the cover ===
Father	Son(s)
Archie Manning	Peyton and Eli Manning
Calvin Hill	Grant Hill
Bobby Hull	Brett Hull
Bill Walton	Luke Walton
Jack Nicklaus	Gary Nicklaus
Phil Simms	Chris Simms
Dale Earnhardt	Dale Earnhardt Jr.
Cal Ripken Sr.	Cal Ripken Jr. and Billy Ripken
Mark McGwire	Matt McGwire
Drew Brees	Baylen Brees
Boomer Esiason	Gunnar Esiason
Chuck Liddell	Cade Liddell
Deion Sanders	Shedeur Sanders

=== Presidents who have been featured on the cover ===
President	SI cover date	Special notes
John F. Kennedy	December 26, 1960	First Lady Jackie Kennedy also on cover and Kennedy was President-Elect at the time of the cover.
Gerald Ford	July 8, 1974	Cover came one month before President Richard Nixon announced he would resign from the Presidency.
Ronald Reagan	November 26, 1984	On cover with Georgetown Hoyas basketball coach John Thompson and Patrick Ewing
Ronald Reagan	February 16, 1987	On cover with America's Cup champion Dennis Conner
Bill Clinton	March 21, 1994	On cover about the Arkansas college basketball team

=== Tribute covers (In Memoriam) ===
Athlete	SI cover date	Special notes
Len Bias	June 30, 1986	Died of a cocaine overdose just after being drafted by the Boston Celtics
Arthur Ashe	February 15, 1993	Tennis great and former U.S. Open champion who died from AIDS after a blood transfusion
Reggie Lewis	August 9, 1993	Celtics player who died due to a heart defect
Mickey Mantle	August 21, 1995	Died after years of battling alcoholism
Walter Payton	November 8, 1999	Died from rare liver disorder
Dale Earnhardt	February 26, 2001	Died in a crash on the last lap of the 2001 Daytona 500.
Brittanie Cecil	April 1, 2002	Fan killed as the result of being struck with a puck to the head while in the crowd at a Columbus Blue Jackets game
Ted Williams	July 15, 2002	Boston Red Sox great who died of cardiac arrest
Johnny Unitas	September 23, 2002	Baltimore Colts great who died from heart attack
Pat Tillman	May 3, 2004	Arizona Cardinals player turned U.S. soldier who was killed in a friendly fire incident in Afghanistan.
Ed Thomas	July 6, 2009	Parkersburg, Iowa, high school football coach who was gunned down by one of his former players on the morning of June 24, 2009.
John Wooden	June 14, 2010	UCLA basketball coaching legend
Junior Seau	May 2, 2012	Pro Football Hall of Fame linebacker who committed suicide at 43
Chuck Noll	June 23, 2014	Four-time Super Bowl-winning coach of the Pittsburgh Steelers
Arnold Palmer	October 3, 2016	Seven-time golf major championship winner
Kobe Bryant	February 2, 2020	Five-time NBA champion with the Los Angeles Lakers who died in a helicopter crash

== Photographers ==
On March 28, 1990, the magazine credited the contributors of its covers up to that date. The November 10, 2003, issue of the magazine listed 379 contributing photographers and agencies.

- Bruce Bennett
- Ylla
- Harry Benson
- Larry Burrows
- Cornell Capa
- Louise Dahl-Wolfe
- Roy DeCarava
- James Drake
- Bill Eppridge
- Graham Finlayson
- Lee Friedlander
- Toni Frissell
- Lois Greenfield
- Helmut Gritscher
- Ernst Haas
- Philippe Halsman
- Walter Iooss
- Lynn Johnson
- Heinz Kluetmeier
- David LaChapelle
- Neil Leifer
- Arnold Newman
- Irving Penn
- Hy Peskin
- Garry Winogrand
- John G. Zimmerman

== Spinoffs ==
Sports Illustrated has helped to launch a number of related publishing ventures.

- Sports Illustrated Kids magazine (circulation 950,000)
  - Launched in January 1989
  - Won the "Distinguished Achievement for Excellence in Educational Publishing" award 11 times
  - Won the "Parents' Choice Magazine Award" 7 times
- Sports Illustrated Almanac annuals
  - Introduced in 1991
  - Yearly compilation of sports news and statistics in book form
- SI.com sports news web site
- Sports Illustrated Australia
  - Launched in 1992 and lasted 6 issues **
- Sports Illustrated Canada
  - Was created and published in Canada with US content from 1993 to 1995. Most of the issues appear to have the same cover except they say 'Canadian Edition'. These issues are numbered differently in the listing. A group of the Canadian issues have unique Canadian athletes (hockey mostly) and all the Canadian issues may have some different article content. The advertising may also be Canada-centric.
- Sports Illustrated Presents
  - Launched in 1989
  - This is their tribute and special edition issues that are sold both nationally or regionally as stand alone products. **Originally started with Super Bowl Tributes the product became a mainstay in 1993 with Alabama as the NCAA National Football Champions. Today multiple issues are released including regional releases of the NCAA, NBA, NFL, MLB champions along with special events or special people. Advertising deals are also done with Sports Illustrated Presents (Kelloggs).
- CNNSI.com a 24-hour sports news web site
  - Launched on July 17, 1997
  - Online version of the magazine
  - The domain name was sold in May 2015
- Sports Illustrated Women magazine (highest circulation 400,000)
  - Launched in March 2000
  - Ceased publication in December 2002 because of a weak advertising climate
- Sports Illustrated on Campus magazine
  - Launched on September 4, 2003
  - Dedicated to college athletics and the sports interests of college students.
  - Distributed free on 72 college campuses through a network of college newspapers.
  - Circulation of one million readers between the ages of 18 and 24.
  - Ceased publication in December 2005 because of a weak advertising climate
- Sports Illustrated Online Casino
  - Launched on February 7, 2023, in Michigan
  - Operated in co-operation with 888 Holdings
  - Also includes Sports Illustrated Sportsbook which launched in September 2021
- Esports Illustrated
  - Launched in March 2023 in partnership with Gaud-Hammer Gaming Group.

== In popular culture ==
The reading of Sports Illustrated was mentioned in the "Weird Al" Yankovic song "A Complicated Song", on his album Poodle Hat, as a thing he couldn't do after being decapitated.

== See also ==
- List of Sports Illustrated Swimsuit Issue cover models
- University of South Carolina steroid scandal
