= Minute Media =

International digital media publisher

Minute Media Ltd. is an international digital media publisher based in the United States, with an associated research and development center in Tel Aviv, Israel. From founding as soccer publication 90min in Israel, the company has grown into a major new media holding company of a number of properties in the field of sports news and commentary, including The Players' Tribune and the FanSided blog network.

The company employs over 600 people and has been projected to generate upwards of $100 million in annual revenue. Its CEO is venture capitalist Asaf Peled.

== History ==
=== Establishment ===
Minute Media was first established in 2011 under the name 90min, a digital publication dedicated to soccer. The company's founders included Asaf Peled, Yuval Larom, and Gili Beiman.

The company had more than 600 employees with offices around the world, as of 2025. About 100 of the company's employees are based in Tel Aviv, most of whom work on technology and product development.

In May 2020, Minute Media launched its own technology brand, Voltax Video. In 2022, the company launched its own advertising platform.

=== Acquisitions ===
Minute Media acquired Mental Floss from the estate of Felix Dennis in September 2018.

In March 2019, Minute Media acquired The Big Lead, a sports blog, from newspaper company Gannett. In November 2019, Minute Media announced the acquisition of The Players' Tribune, a digital media company founded by baseball Hall of Famer Derek Jeter. The division is a media company which allows elite athletes to create their own content for public distribution, thereby bypassing the traditional model of making use of an intermediary publisher. In January 2020, the company announced it acquired FanSided, a network of more than 300 sports blogs.

In 2021, Minute Media made its first technology acquisition with Wazimo, a publishing technology company based in Tel Aviv. In January 2024, Minute Media acquired STN Video, a video production and distribution company focused on sports highlights.

In March 2024, Minute Media licensed the publishing rights to Sports Illustrated from Authentic Brands Group (ABG) for 10 years. It replaced The Arena Group, whose agreement with ABG was cancelled in January 2024.

== Brands ==
- 90min
- The Big Lead
- DBLTAP
- FanSided
- Mental Floss
- The Players' Tribune
- Sports Illustrated
- STN Video
