= List of 2009 all-decade Sports Illustrated awards and honors =

This is a list of Sports Illustrated magazine's all-decade awards and honors for 2000–2009.

== Top 20 Male Athletes of the Decade ==
Top 20 Male Athletes of the Decade were:

1. Tiger Woods (U.S.), golf
2. Roger Federer (Switzerland), tennis
3. Michael Phelps (U.S.), swimming
4. Lance Armstrong (U.S.), cycling
5. Usain Bolt (Jamaica), track and field
6. Tom Brady (U.S.), American football
7. Kobe Bryant (U.S.), basketball
8. Peyton Manning (U.S.), American football
9. Albert Pujols (U.S.), baseball
10. Michael Schumacher (Germany), auto racing
11. Mariano Rivera (Panama), baseball
12. Tim Duncan (U.S.), basketball
13. Zinedine Zidane (France), football
14. Shaquille O'Neal (U.S.), basketball
15. Jimmie Johnson (U.S.), NASCAR
16. LeBron James (U.S.), basketball
17. Manny Pacquiao (Philippines), boxing
18. Derek Jeter (U.S.), baseball
19. Nicklas Lidström (Sweden), ice hockey
20. Alex Rodriguez (U.S.), baseball

== Top 20 Female Athletes of the Decade ==
Top 20 Female Athletes of the Decade were:

1. Serena Williams (U.S.), tennis
2. Annika Sörenstam (Sweden), golf
3. Yelena Isinbayeva (Russia), pole vault
4. Justine Henin (Belgium), tennis
5. Lisa Leslie (U.S.), basketball
6. Venus Williams (U.S.), tennis
7. Marta (Brazil), football
8. Lorena Ochoa (Mexico), golf
9. Diana Taurasi (U.S.), basketball
10. Misty May-Treanor and Kerri Walsh (U.S.), beach volleyball
11. Candace Parker (U.S.), basketball
12. Paula Radcliffe (U.K.), marathon
13. Janica Kostelić (Croatia), alpine skiing
14. Carolina Klüft (Sweden), heptathlon
15. Sheryl Swoopes (U.S.), basketball
16. Hayley Wickenheiser (Canada), ice hockey
17. Cat Osterman (U.S.), softball
18. Cathy Freeman (Australia), track and field
19. Dara Torres (U.S.), swimming
20. Tirunesh Dibaba (Ethiopia), distance running

== All-Decade Team (in eight sports) ==
=== MLB All-Decade Team ===
MLB All-Decade Team:

- C – Joe Mauer, Twins
- 1B – Albert Pujols, Cardinals
- 2B – Chase Utley, Phillies
- SS – Derek Jeter, Yankees
- 3B – Alex Rodriguez, Mariners–Rangers–Yankees
- LF – Barry Bonds, Giants
- CF – Carlos Beltrán, Royals–Astros–Mets
- RF – Vladimir Guerrero, Expos–Angels
- DH – David Ortiz, Twins–Red Sox
- Pitchers:
  - Starting rotation – Pedro Martínez, Red Sox–Mets–Phillies; Johan Santana, Twins–Mets; Roy Halladay, Blue Jays; Randy Johnson, Diamondbacks–Yankees–Giants; Curt Schilling, Phillies–Diamondbacks–Red Sox
  - Setup man – Scot Shields, Angels
  - Closer – Mariano Rivera, Yankees
- MANAGER – Joe Torre, Yankees–Dodgers

=== NBA All-Decade Team ===
NBA All-Decade Team:

STARTING LINEUP

- PG – Steve Nash, Mavericks–Suns
- SG – Kobe Bryant, Lakers
- SF – LeBron James, Cavaliers
- PF – Tim Duncan, Spurs
- C – Shaquille O'Neal, Lakers–Heat–Suns–Cavaliers
- COACH – Phil Jackson, Lakers
- GENERAL MANAGER – Gregg Popovich / R. C. Buford, Spurs

RESERVES

- PF – Kevin Garnett, Timberwolves–Celtics
- PG – Jason Kidd, Suns–Nets–Mavericks
- SG – Dwyane Wade, Heat
- PF – Dirk Nowitzki, Mavericks
- SF – Paul Pierce, Celtics
- SG – Allen Iverson, 76ers-Nuggets-Pistons-Grizzlies
- SF – Carmelo Anthony, Nuggets

=== NFL All-Decade Team ===
NFL All-Decade Team:

OFFENSE

- WR – Randy Moss, Vikings–Raiders–Patriots
- T – Walter Jones, Seahawks
- G – Steve Hutchinson, Seahawks–Vikings
- C – Kevin Mawae, Jets–Titans
- G – Alan Faneca, Steelers–Jets
- T – Jonathan Ogden, Ravens
- TE – Tony Gonzalez, Chiefs–Falcons
- WR – Hines Ward, Steelers
- QB – Tom Brady, Patriots
- RB – LaDainian Tomlinson, Chargers
- FB – Lorenzo Neal, Titans–Bengals–Chargers–Ravens

SPECIAL TEAMS

- K – Adam Vinatieri, Patriots–Colts
- P – Shane Lechler, Raiders
- KR/PR – Dante Hall, Chiefs–Rams
- COACH – Bill Belichick, Patriots

DEFENSE

- DE – Aaron Smith, Steelers
- DT – Kevin Williams, Vikings
- DT/NT – Jamal Williams, Chargers
- DE – Jason Taylor, Dolphins–Redskins
- OLB – Mike Vrabel, Steelers–Patriots–Chiefs
- ILB – Ray Lewis, Ravens
- ILB – London Fletcher, Rams–Bills–Redskins
- OLB – Derrick Brooks, Buccaneers
- CB – Champ Bailey, Redskins-Broncos
- CB – Antoine Winfield, Bills–Vikings
- S – Ed Reed, Ravens
- S – Brian Dawkins, Eagles–Broncos

=== NHL All-Decade Team ===
NHL All-Decade Team:

FIRST TEAM

- G – Martin Brodeur, Devils
- D – Nicklas Lidström, Red Wings
- D – Scott Niedermayer, Devils–Ducks
- LW – Alexander Ovechkin, Capitals
- C – Sidney Crosby, Penguins
- RW – Jaromír Jágr, Penguins–Capitals–Rangers
- COACH – Mike Babcock, Ducks–Red Wings

SECOND TEAM

- G – Jean-Sébastien Giguère, Flames–Ducks
- D – Chris Pronger, Blues–Oilers–Ducks–Flyers
- D – Zdeno Chára, Islanders-Senators–Bruins
- LW – Ilya Kovalchuk, Thrashers
- C – Joe Sakic, Avalanche
- RW – Jarome Iginla, Flames
- COACH – Lindy Ruff, Sabres

=== College basketball All-Decade Team ===
College basketball All-Decade Team:

FIRST TEAM

- SF – Shane Battier, Duke
- PF – Tyler Hansbrough, North Carolina
- C – Emeka Okafor, Connecticut
- SG – JJ Redick, Duke
- PG – Jason Williams, Duke
- COACH – Roy Williams, North Carolina

SECOND TEAM

- SF – Carmelo Anthony, Syracuse
- SF – Adam Morrison, Gonzaga
- SF – Kevin Durant, Texas
- SG – Juan Dixon, Maryland
- PG – Jameer Nelson, Saint Joseph's

=== College football All-Decade Team ===
College football All-Decade Team:

OFFENSE

- WR – Larry Fitzgerald, Pittsburgh
- T – Ryan Clady, Boise State
- G – Steve Hutchinson, Michigan
- C – Greg Eslinger, Minnesota
- G – Duke Robinson, Oklahoma
- T – Jake Long, Michigan
- TE – Kellen Winslow II, Miami
- WR – Michael Crabtree, Texas Tech
- QB – Tim Tebow, Florida
- RB – Darren McFadden, Arkansas
- RB – Adrian Peterson, Oklahoma

SPECIAL TEAMS

- K – Mike Nugent, Ohio State
- P – Daniel Sepulveda, Baylor
- KR – Felix Jones, Arkansas
- PR – Wes Welker, Texas Tech
- COACH – Urban Meyer, Florida

DEFENSE

- DE – David Pollack, Georgia
- DT – Tommie Harris, Oklahoma
- DT – Ndamukong Suh, Nebraska
- DE – Terrell Suggs, Arizona State
- LB – A. J. Hawk, Ohio State
- LB – Derrick Johnson, Texas
- LB – Patrick Willis, Mississippi
- CB – Antoine Cason, Arizona
- CB – Derrick Strait, Oklahoma
- S – Eric Berry, Tennessee
- S – Ed Reed, Miami

=== Soccer All-Decade Team ===
Soccer All-Decade Team:

- G – Gianluigi Buffon, Parma-Juventus
- D – Cafu, AS Roma-AC Milan
- D – Fabio Cannavaro, Parma-Inter Milan-Juventus-Real Madrid
- D – Paolo Maldini, AC Milan
- D – Roberto Carlos, Real Madrid-Fenerbahçe
- M – Cristiano Ronaldo, Sporting-Manchester United-Real Madrid
- M – Zinedine Zidane, Juventus-Real Madrid
- M – Patrick Vieira, Arsenal-Juventus-Inter Milan
- M – Lionel Messi, FC Barcelona
- M – Ronaldinho, Grêmio-Paris Saint Germain-FC Barcelona-AC Milan
- F – Ronaldo, Inter Milan-Real Madrid-AC Milan-Corinthians
- MANAGER – Guus Hiddink, Real Betis-South Korea-PSV Eindhoven-Australia-Russia-Chelsea

=== Golf All-Decade Team ===
Golf All-Decade Team:

- Tiger Woods
- Phil Mickelson
- Annika Sorenstam
- Vijay Singh
- Hale Irwin
- Lorena Ochoa
- Ryan Moore
- Dana Quigley
- Pádraig Harrington
- Tom Watson

== Top 10 Coaches/Managers of the Decade ==
Top 10 Coaches/Managers of the Decade:

1. Phil Jackson, Los Angeles Lakers (NBA)
2. Bill Belichick, New England Patriots (NFL)
3. Joe Torre, New York Yankees–Los Angeles Dodgers (MLB)
4. Terry Francona, Boston Red Sox (MLB)
5. Tony Dungy, Tampa Bay Buccaneers-Indianapolis Colts (NFL)
6. Gregg Popovich, San Antonio Spurs (NBA)
7. Geno Auriemma, University of Connecticut women's basketball
8. Roy Williams, University of North Carolina men's basketball
9. Urban Meyer, Bowling Green football – Utah football – Florida football
10. Tom Izzo, Michigan State men's basketball

== Top 10 GMs/Executives of the Decade ==
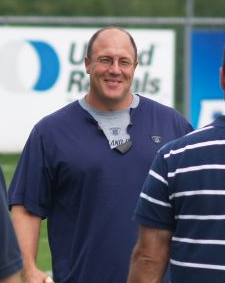
Pioli in 2007

Top 10 GMs/Executives of the Decade:

1. Scott Pioli, New England Patriots (NFL)
2. Ken Holland, Detroit Red Wings (NHL)
3. Theo Epstein, Boston Red Sox (MLB)
4. Kevin Colbert, Pittsburgh Steelers (NFL)
5. R. C. Buford, San Antonio Spurs (NBA)
6. Rick Hendrick, Hendrick Motorsports (NASCAR)
7. Pat Gillick, Toronto Blue Jays/Seattle Mariners/Philadelphia Phillies (MLB)
8. Jeremy Foley, University of Florida (NCAA)
9. Joe Dumars, Detroit Pistons (NBA)
10. Billy Beane, Oakland Athletics (MLB)

== Top Team of the Decade (in six sports) ==
Top Team of the Decade:

=== MLB ===
- New York Yankees, 2009

=== NBA ===
- Los Angeles Lakers, 2000–01

=== NFL ===
- New England Patriots, 2007

=== NHL ===
- Detroit Red Wings, 2001–02

=== College basketball ===
- Florida Gators men's basketball, 2006–07

=== College football ===
- Miami Hurricanes football, 2001

== Top 25 Franchises of the Decade ==
Top 25 Franchises of the Decade including professional and college teams.

1. Los Angeles Lakers (NBA)
2. New England Patriots (NFL)
3. Connecticut Huskies women's basketball
4. San Antonio Spurs (NBA)
5. New York Yankees (MLB)
6. Detroit Red Wings (NHL)
7. USC Trojans football
8. Indianapolis Colts (NFL)
9. Texas Longhorns football
10. North Carolina Tar Heels men's basketball
11. Boston Red Sox (MLB)
12. Oklahoma Sooners football
13. Kansas Jayhawks men's basketball

14. Pittsburgh Steelers (NFL)
15. Florida Gators football
16. LSU Tigers football
17. Michigan State Spartans men's basketball
18. Detroit Pistons (NBA)
19. New Jersey Devils (NHL)
20. Florida Gators men's basketball
21. Ohio State Buckeyes football
22. Duke Blue Devils men's basketball
23. St. Louis Cardinals (MLB)
24. Tennessee Lady Volunteers basketball
25. Los Angeles Angels of Anaheim (MLB)

== Major League Baseball ==
Major League Baseball:

- Player of the Decade: Albert Pujols, Cardinals
- MLB All-Decade Team (above)
- Best Manager: Joe Torre, Yankees and Dodgers
- Best GM: Theo Epstein, Red Sox
- Top Team of the Decade (above)
- Best Franchise: New York Yankees
- Best Regular-Season Game: Twins-Tigers, Oct. 6, 2009
- Best Postseason Game: Yankees-Diamondbacks, Game 7, 2001 World Series

== National Basketball Association ==
National Basketball Association:

- Player of the Decade: Tim Duncan, Spurs
- NBA All-Decade Team (above)
- Best Coach: Phil Jackson, Lakers
- Best GM: Gregg Popovich/R. C. Buford, Spurs
- Top Team of the Decade (above)
- Best Franchise: Los Angeles Lakers
- Best Regular-Season Game: Suns-Nets; Dec. 7, 2006
- Best Postseason Game: Lakers-Kings, Game 7, 2002 Western Conference finals

== National Football League ==
National Football League:

- Player of the Decade: Peyton Manning, Colts
- NFL All-Decade Team (above)
- Best Coach: Bill Belichick, Patriots
- Best GM: Bill Polian, Colts
- Top Team of the Decade (above)
- Best Franchise: New England Patriots
- Best Regular-Season Game: Colts 38, Buccaneers 35 (OT); Oct. 6, 2003
- Best Playoff Game (non-Super Bowl): Steelers 21, Colts 18; 2005 AFC divisional game
- Best Super Bowl: Steelers 27, Cardinals 23; XLIII

== National Hockey League ==
National Hockey League:

- Player of the Decade: Nicklas Lidström, Red Wings
- NHL All-Decade Team (above)
- Best Coach: Mike Babcock, Ducks and Red Wings
- Best GM: Ken Holland, Red Wings
- Top Team of the Decade (above)
- Best Franchise: Detroit Red Wings
- Most Dramatic Regular-Season Games: Maple Leafs-Canadiens; April 7, 2007; Islanders-Devils; April 8, 2007
- Best Postseason Game: Flyers-Penguins; May 4–5, 2000

== Soccer ==
Soccer:

- Player of the Decade: Zinedine Zidane, Juventus-Real Madrid
- Best Manager: Guus Hiddink, Real Betis-South Korea-PSV Eindhoven-Australia-Russia-Chelsea
- Best World Cup Game: United States vs. Portugal, in 2002
- Best Non-World Cup Game: AC Milan vs. Liverpool, in 2005
- Best National Team: Brazil
- Best Club Team: Manchester United F.C.
- Cinderella: South Korea at the 2002 FIFA World Cup
- Biggest Overachiever: Greece at the 2004 UEFA European Championship
- Biggest Underachiever: Argentina
- Biggest Controversy: 2006 Italian football scandal
- Hottest Feud: Landon Donovan-David Beckham
- Signature Play: Zidane's pirouette
- Under-the-Radar Story: MLS players' lawsuit
- Biggest Meltdown: Zinedine Zidane
- Best Trash Talker: Marco Materazzi
- Most Inspirational Story: U.S. women's team, in 2008
- Biggest Villain: Cuauhtémoc Blanco
- Pyrrhic Victory: France vs. Ireland, in 2009
- Best Club Rivalry: Arsenal F.C.–Manchester United F.C. rivalry
- Best National-Team Rivalry: France–Italy football rivalry
- Outsized Personality: José Mourinho
- Best Innovation: High-definition football broadcasts
- Worst Innovation: Tinkering with the ball
- Biggest Near-Miss: Torsten Frings' uncalled penalty, in 2002

== Golf ==
Golf:

- Golfer of the Decade: Tiger Woods

== College basketball honors ==
College basketball:

- Player of the Decade: Tyler Hansbrough, North Carolina
- All-Decade Team (above)
- Best Coach: Roy Williams, North Carolina
- Top Team of the Decade (above)
- Best School: Michigan State
- Best Single-Season Team: Saint Joseph's, 2004
- Best Regular-Season Game: Gonzaga 109, Michigan State 103 (3 OT) in the 2005 Maui Invitational
- Best Postseason Game: Syracuse 127, Connecticut 117 (6 OT) in the 2009 Big East tournament
- Best Year for NCAA Tournament: 2005
- Best Recruiting Class: Florida, 2004
- Signature Play: Mario Chalmers' game-tying shot for Kansas at the end of regulation in the 2008 NCAA tournament final against Memphis
- Biggest Controversy: Baylor University basketball scandal, 2003
- Biggest Cinderella: George Mason, 2006

== College football honors ==
College football:

- Player of the Decade: Tim Tebow, Florida
- All-Decade Team (above)
- Best Coach: Urban Meyer, Bowling Green/Utah/Florida
- Top Team of the Decade (above)
- Best Program: USC
- Best Regular-Season Game: USC at Notre Dame (2005)
- Best Bowl Game: 2007 Fiesta Bowl (Boise State vs. Oklahoma)
- Biggest Upset: Appalachian State 34, Michigan 32 (2007)
- Signature Play: Tim Tebow's jump pass
- Biggest Controversy:
- Most Outstanding Single-Game Performance: Vince Young, for Texas against USC (2006 Rose Bowl)
- Best Recruiting Class: USC, 2003
- Best Team Rivalry: Oklahoma–Texas
- Best Coaching Rivalry: Kyle Whittingham (Utah) vs. Bronco Mendenhall (BYU)
- Best Conference: SEC
- Best Innovation: Spread option

== Top 24 one-hit wonders of the decade ==
Top 24 one-hit wonders:

1. David Tyree (NFL) (see also Helmet Catch)
2. George Mason Patriots men's basketball (2006)
3. Hasim Rahman (boxing)
4. Tampa Bay Lightning (NHL)
5. Maurice Clarett (NCAA football)
6. Greece national football team (UEFA Euro 2004)
7. Hilary Lunke (golf)
8. Aaron Small (MLB)
9. Giacomo (horse)
10. Golden State Warriors (NBA)
11. Derek Anderson (NFL)
12. Gastón Gaudio and Anastasia Myskina (tennis)
13. Michael Waltrip (NASCAR)
14. Florida Marlins (MLB) (2003)
15. José Théodore (NHL)
16. Los Angeles Clippers (NBA)
17. Jonathan Cheechoo (NHL)
18. Bud Smith (MLB)
19. Playmakers
20. Bob May (golf)
21. Senegal national football team
22. Jerome James (NBA)
23. Edmonton Oilers (NHL)

== Top 24 blockbuster trades of the decade ==
Top 24 blockbuster trades:

== Top 10 new stadiums of the decade ==
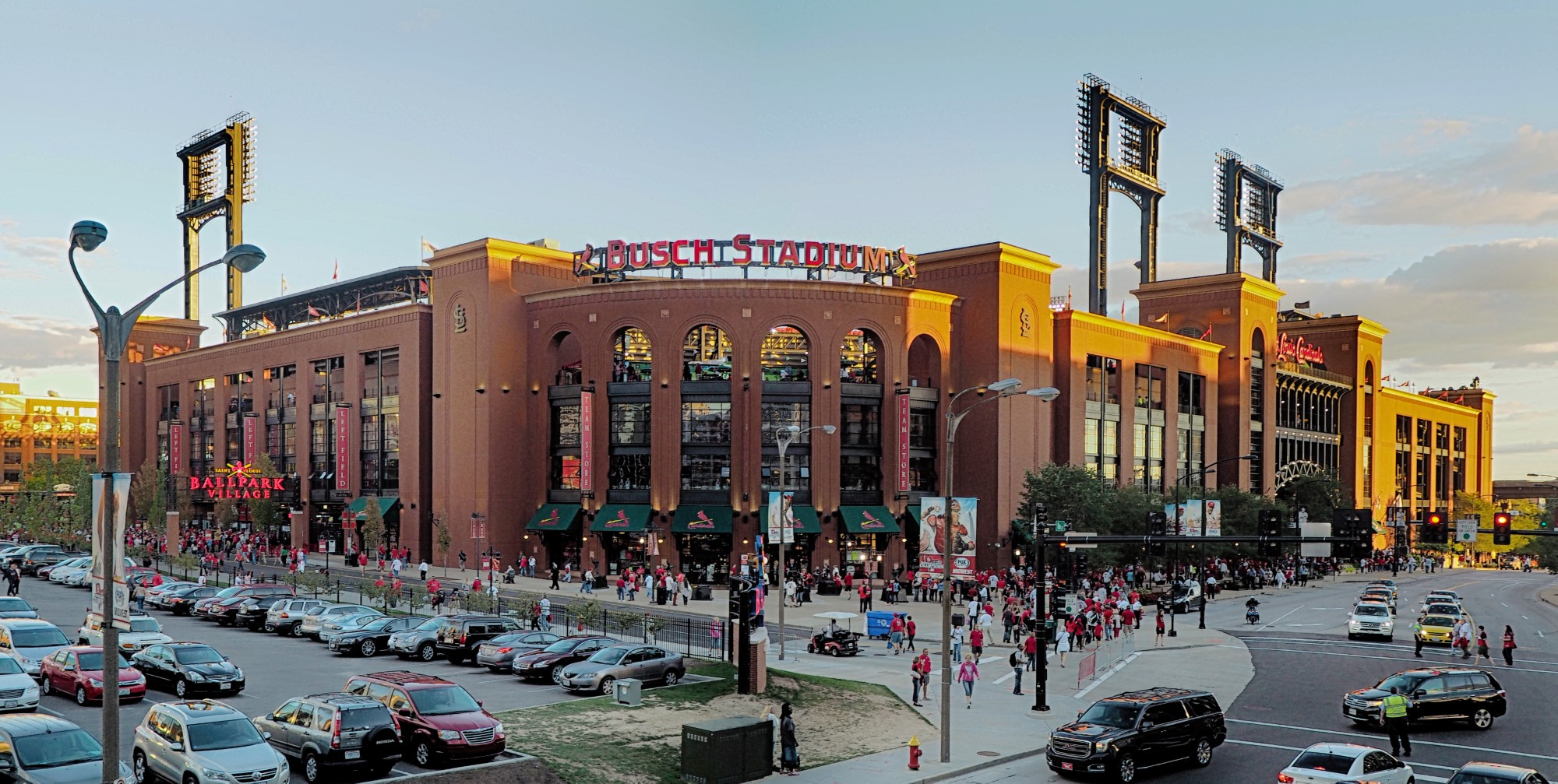
Busch Stadium in 2014

Top 10 new stadiums:

1. Busch Stadium (St. Louis Cardinals)
2. CenturyLink Field (Seattle Seahawks)
3. Miller Park (Milwaukee Brewers)
4. Citizens Bank Park (Philadelphia Phillies)
5. Reliant Stadium (Houston Texans)
6. PNC Park (Pittsburgh Pirates)
7. Yankee Stadium (New York Yankees)
8. Cowboys Stadium (Dallas Cowboys)
9. AT&T Park (San Francisco Giants)
10. University of Phoenix Stadium (Arizona Cardinals)

== Top 21 milestones of the decade ==
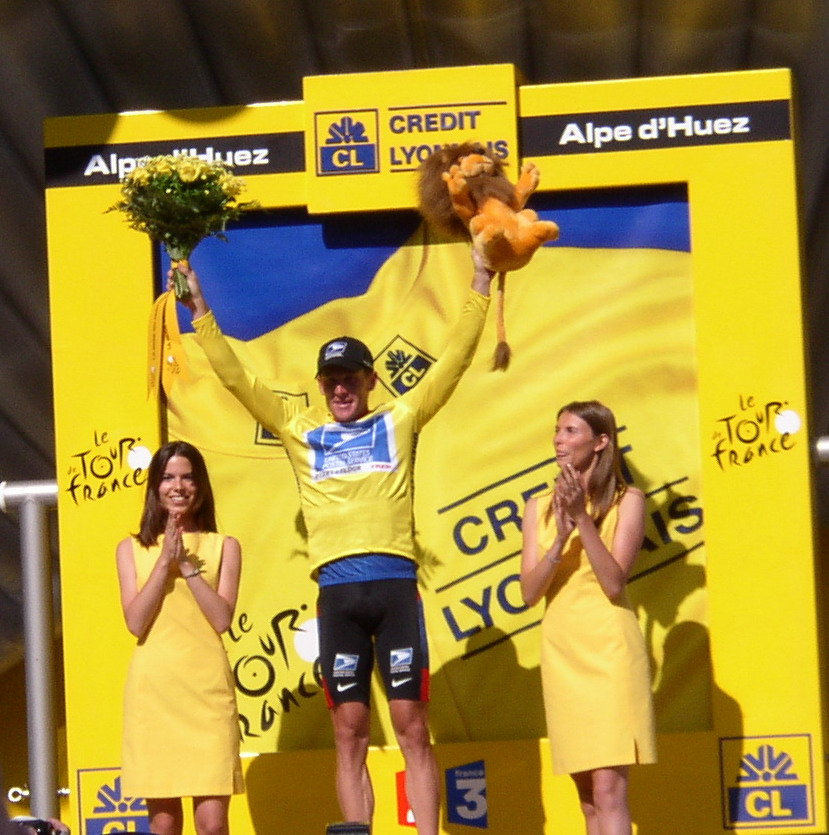
Lance Armstrong celebrating at the 2003 Tour de France

Top 21 milestones:

1. Lance Armstrong's seven Tour de France titles
2. Michael Phelps winning eight gold medals at the 2008 Summer Olympics
3. Barry Bonds hitting 756 home runs
4. Roger Federer winning 14 majors
5. Emmitt Smith breaking the all-time NFL rushing record
6. Tiger Woods winning all four golfing majors in a single 12-month period
7. Jimmie Johnson winning five consecutive NASCAR championships
8. Florida Gators men's basketball winning consecutive NCAA championships
9. Tiger Woods winning the 2000 U.S. Open by a 15-stroke margin
10. 2007 New England Patriots' 18-0 record
11. Martin Brodeur winning 552 games
12. Brett Favre throwing 421 touchdowns
13. Usain Bolt breaking the 100 meter and 200 meter dash world records
14. Kelly Slater winning 34 surfing events, receiving a perfect score and nine ASP championships
15. Ronaldo scoring 15 World Cup goals
16. Ichiro Suzuki breaking the single-season hit record
17. Pat Summitt becoming the most victorious basketball coach in NCAA history
18. Bob Knight winning his 880th game
19. Tom Brady breaking the single-season passing touchdown record
20. John Gagliardi breaking the record for NCAA football wins

== Top 21 rivalries of the decade ==
Top 21 rivalries:

1. New York Yankees vs. Boston Red Sox (baseball)
2. Roger Federer vs. Rafael Nadal (tennis)
3. New England Patriots vs. Indianapolis Colts (American football)
4. Shaquille O'Neal vs. Kobe Bryant (basketball)
5. North Carolina Tar Heels vs. Duke Blue Devils (college basketball)
6. Oklahoma Sooners vs. Texas Longhorns (college football)
7. Sidney Crosby vs. Alexander Ovechkin (hockey)
8. Manchester United vs. Arsenal (football)
9. Tennessee Lady Volunteers vs. Connecticut Huskies (women's college basketball)
10. Tiger Woods vs. Phil Mickelson (golf)
11. Micky Ward vs. Arturo Gatti (boxing)
12. Tony Stewart vs. Kurt Busch (NASCAR)
13. Pittsburgh Steelers vs. Baltimore Ravens (American football)
14. JJ Redick vs. Adam Morrison (college basketball)
15. Ken Shamrock vs. Tito Ortiz (UFC)
16. France vs. Italy (soccer)
17. Los Angeles Lakers vs. San Antonio Spurs (basketball)
18. Pittsburgh Penguins vs. Philadelphia Flyers (hockey)
19. Moneyball vs. Tradition (baseball)
20. United States vs. Canada (women's ice hockey)

== Ten "overlooked" performances ==
Ten "overlooked" performances:

== Ten memorable acts of sportsmanship ==
Ten memorable acts of sportsmanship:

== Top 10 stories of the decade ==
Top 10 stories of the decade:

== Top 10 flops of the decade ==
Top 10 flops:

1. Duke Blue Devils men's basketball — Unlike the other entries in this list, Duke was highly successful on the court throughout the decade. The Blue Devils were "honored" because of their alleged tendency to flop in order to draw offensive fouls.
2. 2004 USA men's basketball team — Amid a breakdown of team chemistry, Team USA lost more games in the 2004 Olympics (three) than it had in all previous Olympic tournaments combined (two).
3. Barry Zito — After considerable success with the Oakland Athletics, the left-handed pitcher crossed San Francisco Bay after the 2006 season to play for the San Francisco Giants, signing what was then the richest contract for a pitcher in baseball history. He proceeded to go 31–43 in the next three seasons, never posting an ERA below 4.00.
4. Monday Night Football announcers, mainly Dennis Miller and Tony Kornheiser
5. Charlie Weis at Notre Dame — A successful assistant coach in the NFL, Weis was 35–27 in 5 seasons at Notre Dame, including a record of 16–21 in his last 3 seasons.
6. Darko Miličić — Drafted #2 overall in the 2003 NBA draft by the Detroit Pistons, immediately before Carmelo Anthony, Chris Bosh and Dwyane Wade, but never averaged more than 8 points in any season.
7. Steve Spurrier with the Washington Redskins — A successful coach in the NCAA, Spurrier was 12-20 in his 2 years with the Redskins, and did not make the playoffs in those years.
8. Ron Zook, first at Florida and then at Illinois — Zook coached Florida for 3 seasons, with a record of 23–14, and did not beat a ranked opponent at home in those years. He was then hired by Illinois and compiled a record of 34–51 in his 7 seasons there.
9. Matt Millen — In Millen's seven-plus seasons as the general manager of the Detroit Lions, the team went 31–84. He was fired three games into the 2008 season, which would end with the Lions becoming the first NFL team ever to go 0–16.
10. NFL Network — At the end of 2009, after six years of operation, the NFL's in-house TV network still had not reached carriage deals with many of the nation's biggest cable providers.

== Top 10 scandals of the decade ==
Top 10 scandals:

1. BALCO doping scandal (2003) – see also Barry Bonds perjury case and Marion Jones
2. Mitchell Report (2007) and leaked 2003 MLB list of PED users (2009)
3. Michael Vick dogfighting case (2007)
4. Duke lacrosse case (2006)
5. Tim Donaghy NBA betting scandal (2007)
6. Tiger Woods sex scandal (2009)
7. Danny Almonte age fraud (2001 Little League World Series)
8. Tour de France doping scandals, 2006 and 2007
9. Baylor University basketball scandal (2003)
10. Spygate (2007)

== See also ==
- List of sports awards honoring women
- Sports Illustrated Sportsman of the Year
- Sporting News § Athlete of the Year

== Notes ==
- For ESPN.com's list of the ten greatest teams of the 20th century (in the U.S.), see footnote.
