= FanSided =

Internet entertainment network

- Website type: Sports and entertainment
- Available in: English, Spanish
- Headquarters: Chicago, Illinois, United States
- Owner: Minute Media
- Founders: Zach Best, Adam Best
- Website: fansided.com
- Commercial: Yes
- Launched: 2009; 17 years ago

FanSided is a network of more than 300 commercial American sports, lifestyle, and entertainment websites and newsletters. It was co-founded and launched in 2009 by brothers Zach Best and Adam Best. The network was sold to Time Inc. in May 2015.

Since January 2020, FanSided network has been owned by Minute Media and is headquartered in Chicago, Illinois.

== History ==
=== Establishment ===
The FanSided sports blog network traces its roots to 2007, when Adam Best and Zach Best, brothers from Springfield, Missouri, launched a blog dedicated to the Kansas City Chiefs of the National Football League called Arrowhead Addict. The brothers possessed complementary skills for establishment of a sports blog, with Adam having a background in sportswriting and Zach in web design.

The brothers incorporated FanSided as a sports blog network in 2009. Zach Best explained in a 2015 interview that the company moniker was derived from what the brothers felt was the one-sided nature of sports team fans. "Combining fans and that is FanSided," he explained.

The blog network grew rapidly, hitting the 300 site mark by 2015.

In an October 2015 interview, Adam Best explained the formula for his company's rapid growth:

"I think the reason we had success was because, compared to other media outlets who were unbiased and objective, we decided that we were going to represent the fans from that point of view, and fans just seemed to eat it up. ...[W]e expanded to cover the NFL with a site for each team, and did the same thing for pro baseball, hockey, basketball, college sports, and other sports like NASCAR and boxing and mixed martial arts. Eventually we took the same concept to entertainment, and we just try to keep making our special sauce better year in and year out."

=== Development ===
Over time, the site expanded to include other professional sports, as well as more topics, including general news, entertainment, lifestyle and fandoms like Game of Thrones, The Walking Dead, and Star Wars.

Matt Blake joined the company as a partner and chief product officer in 2011. Both Matt Blake and Zach Best served as joint co-CEOs of FanSided during this interval.

In August 2012, FanSided launched a partnership with Sports Illustrated offering the long-established magazine and website an opportunity to expand local sports coverage and reach new customers through FanSided's robust digital network. As part of the partnership, Sports Illustrated's website featured links to content on FanSided websites. Time Inc. also sold ads on the FanSided websites with revenue shared between the two entities.

=== Sale to Time Inc. ===
The FanSided network, including its mobile app and newsletter, was acquired by Time Inc., publisher of Sports Illustrated, on May 26, 2015. The acquisition of the company and its 300 focused websites was intended to expand Sports Illustrated's local sports coverage. The company also planned to use FanSided's entertainment and lifestyle websites to bolster its existing holdings, which included Entertainment Weekly.

Financial details of the agreement were not disclosed. Under terms of the acquisition, founders Adam and Zach Best were to continue to oversee FanSided as a division of Sports Illustrated Group.

On March 2, 2017, Adam Best announced his departure from the company.

On January 31, 2018, Time Inc. was acquired by Meredith Corporation, which assumed ownership of all of Time Inc.’s media brands, including FanSided.

=== Sale to Minute Media ===
In January 2020, FanSided was sold to Minute Media by Meredith Corporation for a reported $15 million. The acquisition was intended to allow Minute Media to target fans of specific teams.

=== Traffic ===
At the time of the 2015 acquisition by Time Inc., FanSided had more than 300 websites as part of its network, drawing approximately 15 million unique visitors and generating an average of 50 million page views per month.

As of December 2019, comScore put FanSided traffic at 23.5 million unique visitors per month.
