= Mental Floss =

American online magazine and media company

- Founder: Will Pearson; Mangesh Hattikudur
- First issue: 2001; 25 years ago
- Final issue Number: 2016 November/December(print) v. 15, no. 6
- Company: Minute Media
- Country: United States
- Based in: New York City, New York, United States
- Language: English
- Website: mentalfloss.com
- ISSN: 1543-4702

Mental Floss (stylized as mental_floss) is an American online magazine and digital, print, and e-commerce media company focused on millennials. It is owned by Minute Media, an international digital media publisher based in London, England, with an associated research and development center in Tel Aviv, Israel. It is based in New York City. mentalfloss.com, which presents facts, puzzles, and trivia with a humorous tone, draws 20.5 million unique users a month. Its YouTube channel produces three weekly series and has 1.3 million subscribers. In October 2015, Mental Floss teamed with the National Geographic Channel for its first televised special, Brain Surgery Live with mental_floss, the first brain surgery ever broadcast live.

Launched in Birmingham, Alabama, in 2001, the company has additional offices in Midtown Manhattan. The publication was included in Inc. magazine's list of the 5,000 fastest growing private companies. Before it became a web-only publication in 2017, the magazine Mental Floss had a circulation of 160,000 and published six issues a year. The magazine had more than 100,000 subscribers in over 17 countries. The November/December 2016 issue was the last issue of the print edition of the magazine. Instead of getting a refund, subscribers were sent copies of The Week.

The company frequently publishes books and sells humorous T-shirts. It also developed a licensed trivia board game called Split Decision, similar to Trivial Pursuit. Its online store sells quirky home and office supplies, games and toys.

Dennis Publishing bought Mental Floss in 2011. Mental Floss was acquired by Minute Media from the Felix Dennis estate in September 2018.

== Origin ==
The magazine was co-founded by William E. Pearson and Mangesh Hattikudur while they were students at Duke University. According to the Mental Floss website, the idea came from conversations in the Duke cafeteria about the need for an entertaining educational magazine. According to Hattikudur, they wanted to "distill some of the best lectures from our favorite college professors. We thought if we could bottle their enthusiasm and deliver it in monthly installments, it'd be great."

Later, Pearson met with president of Duke University, who loved the idea, but disliked the name. The first published issue, known as the "Campus Edition", was published in spring 2000, distributing 3,000 issues.

The founders spent much of their first year looking for investors and staff members while raising funds to publish the first issue, which was released in May 2001. Over the following summer, 8,000 copies were distributed, and 60% sold out on newsstands. Pearson and Hattikidur were named two of thirty promising 2007 entrepreneurs in business magazine Inc.

Mental Floss was sold to magazine mogul Felix Dennis in 2011 and again to Minute Media in late 2018.

Beginning in June 2017, Pearson and Hattikudur have been producing the podcast Part Time Genius, a variety style knowledge show, created in partner with HowStuffWorks. In addition to the magazine, a board game, a weekly CNN Headline News segment and a daily updated website, the two have collaborated on seven Mental Floss books.

=== Mangesh Hattikudur ===
Mangesh Hattikudur is an American businessman who co-founded Mental Floss, with Pearson when both were students at Duke University. Hattikudur graduated from Duke in 2001 with a Bachelor of Arts degree. The Huffington Post in 2010 wrote that Hattikudur and Pearson have created a knowledge empire complete with board games, T-shirts, and a website called mentalfloss.com which has monthly visitors tallying into the millions. They have collaborated on books such as The Mental Floss History of the United States along with writer Erik Sass.

=== Will Pearson ===
William E. Pearson (born 1979) co-founder of Mental Floss with Hattikudur. Pearson graduated from Duke in 2001, with a Bachelor of Arts degree in history. Will Pearson and Mangesh Hattikudur met as freshmen at Duke University and in their senior year parlayed their cafeteria conversations into the first issue of Mental Floss magazine.

== Notable contributors ==
- Novelist John Green worked for the magazine early in his career. Having later become an established YouTube personality, he began hosting its YouTube channel in March 2013. In 2014, the Mental Floss channel was listed on New Media Rockstars Top 100 Channels, ranked at #71. In 2015, Green won the Webby Award for Mental Floss on YouTube.
- Author A. J. Jacobs contributed articles based on what he learned reading the Encyclopædia Britannica, as described in his book The Know-It-All. He currently writes a history column answering reader mail.
- Ken Jennings, of Jeopardy! fame, wrote a feature called Six Degrees of Ken Jennings, in which he played the game six degrees of separation with two unrelated people or things, like Benedict XVI and Benedict Arnold or Isaac Newton and Apple Computer. He now contributes a quiz called "Kennections" on mentalfloss.com.
- Kara Kovalchik and Sandy Wood served as research editors for the magazine from 2002 to 2015.
- Celebrity chef Alton Brown wrote a food column and appeared on the cover of the September 2012 issue.
- Saturday Night Live writer Streeter Seidell has written for both Mental Floss magazine and the website.
- Comedian Amir Blumenfeld writes a column called The Curious Comedian.
- Author Ransom Riggs was a longtime contributor to both the magazine and website.
- Linguist Arika Okrent is the language editor for Mental Floss. In 2015, she received the Linguistic Society of America's Linguistics Journalism Award.
- Science journalist Maggie Koerth-Baker was an assistant editor and co-authored the 2009 Mental Floss book Be Amazing.
- Hank Green has written for the magazine and is executive producer of the YouTube Channel. He also authored the Mental Floss book Scatterbrained.
- Comedian Elliott Morgan hosts the weekly series "Misconceptions" on the Mental Floss channel on YouTube.
- Comedian Max Silvestri has hosted two series on the YouTube channel.
- Craig Benzine hosts the weekly series "The Big Question" on the YouTube channel.

== Magazine sections ==
Each issue of Mental Floss magazine was divided into the following sections:

- Scatterbrained: 10 pages of trivia, facts and anecdotes about an everyday topic or item.
- Be Amazing!: 10 pages of short articles and interviews, often by guest contributors.
- Left_Brain/Right_Brain: articles about "left brain" topics, like science and logic, and "right brain" topics, like art and literature.
- Features: Some examples were an exposé of Shel Silverstein's darker side and a collection of the 25 Most Important Questions in the Universe.
- Go Mental: articles about religion, art, history and world culture.
- The Quiz: a brief quiz at the back of the magazine.

=== Recurring themes ===
Every year, Mental Floss published a "Ten Issue". It usually featured lists of ten things focusing on subjects like: "Ten Most Forgettable Presidents" or "Ten Famous Monkeys in Science".

Initially, "Mental Floss" tried to feature self-proclaimed mascot Albert Einstein on the cover of each issue. The magazine even did a 'swimsuit issue', which featured a topless Einstein.

== Recurring blog categories ==
- Morning Cup of Links: Interesting links to news stories, videos and memes from across the Internet
- 5 Questions Quiz: Daily quizzes with subject clues hidden inside trivia questions
- The Amazing Fact Generator: A page that generates random facts and trivia
- Big Questions: Articles that answer questions about history, origins, or science

=== Books ===
- Mental Floss History of the World: An Irreverent Romp Through Civilization's Best Bits
- Genius Instruction Manual
- Scatterbrained
- What's the Difference?
- Cocktail Party Cheat Sheets
- Condensed Knowledge
- Forbidden Knowledge
- Instant Knowledge
- In the Beginning
- Be Amazing
- mental_floss Trivia
- mental_floss: The Book: Only The Greatest Lists in the History of Listory
- The Mental Floss History of the United States: The (Almost) Complete and (Entirely) Entertaining Story of America

== Media coverage and awards ==
Mental Floss has been covered by magazines and newspapers such as Reader's Digest, Los Angeles Times, CNN.com, Atlanta Journal-Constitution, Entertainment Weekly, Newsweek, Dallas Morning News, The Wall Street Journal, The New York Times and the Washington Post. Other media coverage includes:

- Listed as one of the Chicago Tribune's 50 favorite magazines in June 2007
- Listed as one of PC World 's 100 favorite blogs in June 2007
- Will Pearson and Mangesh Hattikudur among Inc. magazine's 30 "coolest young entrepreneurs
- Listed as the seventh most engaged company on Twitter by Digiday
- Recognized by Time for having one of the top 140 Twitter feeds in 2013.
- Won a Webby Award for "Best Cultural Blog" in May 2013.
- Finalist for "General Excellence" at the National Magazine Awards in 2013.
- Voted one of the "100 Best Websites for Women" by Forbes in 2013.
- Mental Floss won the 2020 Webby People's Voice Award for Weird in the category Web.
