= Bruce Bennett (photographer) =

American ice hockey photographer

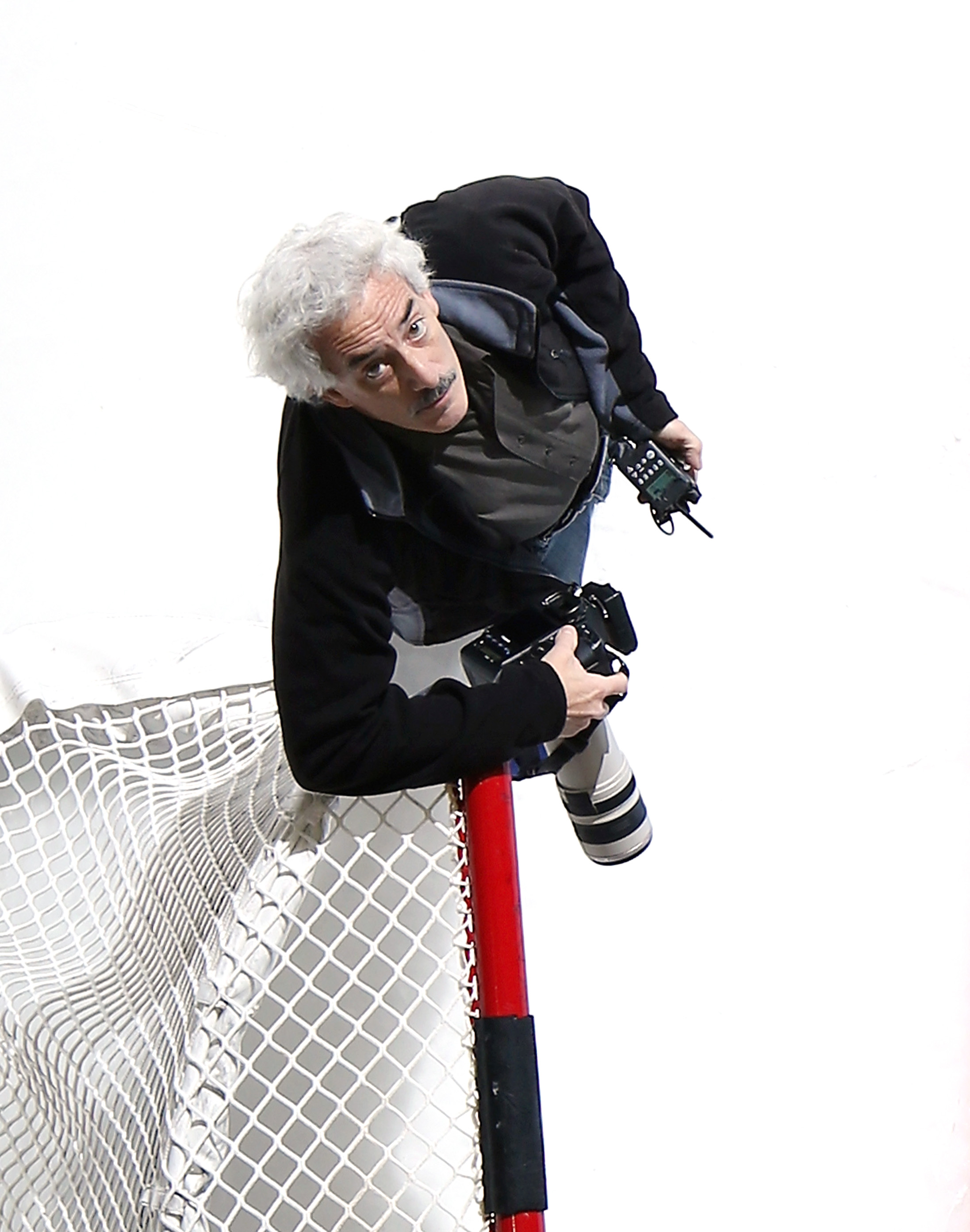
- Bennett in 2014
- Born: 1955 (age 70–71); Brooklyn, New York, U.S.
- Occupation: Photographer
- Years active: 1974–present
- Employer: Getty Images
- Known for: Ice hockey photography - over 6,000 professional hockey games photographed
- Notable work: Hockey’s Greatest Photos: The Bruce Bennett Collection
- Title: Director of hockey imagery
- Honors: United States Hockey Hall of Fame (2025); New York State Hockey Hall of Fame (2025)

Bruce Bennett (born 1955) is an American sports photographer who specializes in the coverage of ice hockey. Since beginning his career in 1974, he has photographed more than 6,000 professional games, including over 5,300 in the National Hockey League (NHL), as well as multiple Stanley Cup Finals, NHL All-Star Game, Winter Olympic Games, and international tournaments. He founded Bruce Bennett Studios, and the company along with its hockey photo archive was acquired by Getty Images in 2004, where he serves as director of hockey imagery. In 2025, he became the first photographer to be inducted into the United States Hockey Hall of Fame, and was also inducted into the New York State Hockey Hall of Fame.

== Early life and education ==
Bennett was born in Brooklyn, New York, in 1955 and grew up on Long Island. When he was in elementary school, he started taking photos on school field trips, using his father's Kodak Instamatic. He earned an accounting degree at the then C.W. Post Campus of Long Island University, now LIU Post.

== Career ==
Bennett began photographing hockey in 1974 at the age of 18, at venues including Madison Square Garden and the Nassau Veterans Memorial Coliseum. His first career break came when he mailed unsolicited photos of the NY Islanders and NY Rangers to Ken McKenzie, co-founder of the Montreal-based weekly The Hockey News. McKenzie purchased his photos, and arranged for Bennett to have a photo pass for future games.

He later founded Bruce Bennett Studios, and became the team photographer for the Islanders, Rangers, Philadelphia Flyers, and NJ Devils. He also began acquiring hockey photo archives dating back to the early 20th century, from private collectors and through bankruptcy proceedings.

In 2004, Getty Images bought Bennett's archive of photos and hired him to run their hockey department, as their director of hockey imagery.

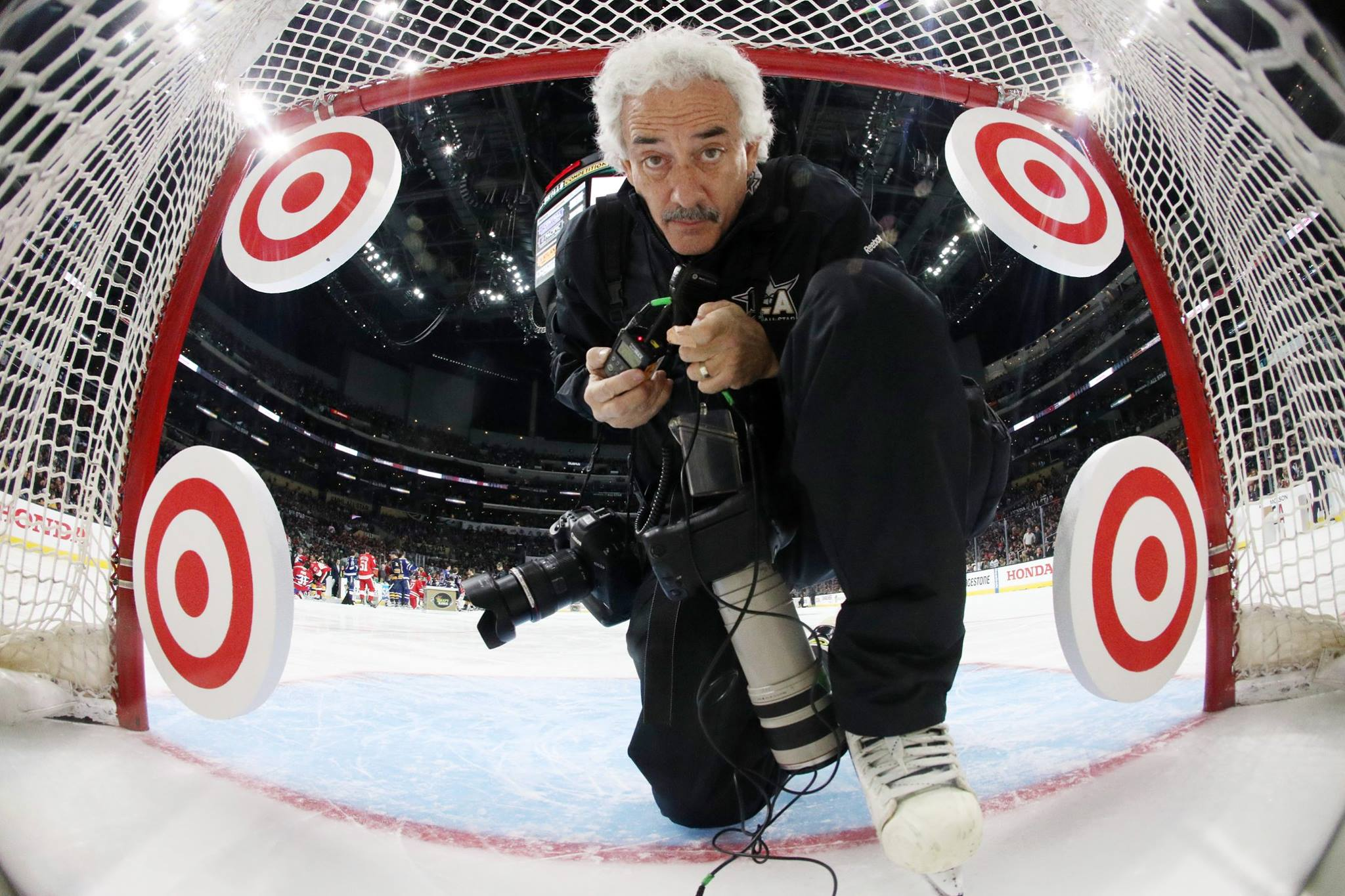
Sports photographer Bruce Bennett takes a self-portrait with the 'Hockey Netcam' during the National Hockey League All-Star Skills Competition on January 28, 2017, in Los Angeles, California, United States.

In July 2025, Bennett was inducted into the NY Hockey Hall of Fame. On December 10, 2025, he became the first photographer inducted into the United States Hockey Hall of Fame. Also In 2025, Bennett published his first compilation of photos, Hockey’s Greatest Photos: The Bruce Bennett Collection, in collaboration with The Hockey News.

In 2026, Bennett led the Getty Images team overseeing US Men's and Women's ice hockey at the 2026 Winter Olympics held in Milan, Italy. It was Bennett's seventh Winter Olympic games covering ice hockey.

== Work ==
Bennett's US Hockey Hall of Fame biography states that his archive includes more than 2.5 million images. Also according to his US Hockey Hall of Fame biography, he's photographed 5,300 NHL regular-season and playoff games, including 45 Stanley Cup deciding contests, six Olympic Winter Games (now seven as of 2026), and more than 470 international games. He served as team photographer for the New York Islanders, Philadelphia Flyers, New York Rangers, and New Jersey Devils. His images have been published in almost every major hockey publication.

== Honors ==
- Inducted into the New York State Hockey Hall of Fame (2025)
- Inducted into the United States Hockey Hall of Fame (2025)

== Personal life ==
Bennett lives with his wife on Long Island.
