= The Sport Review =

British News website

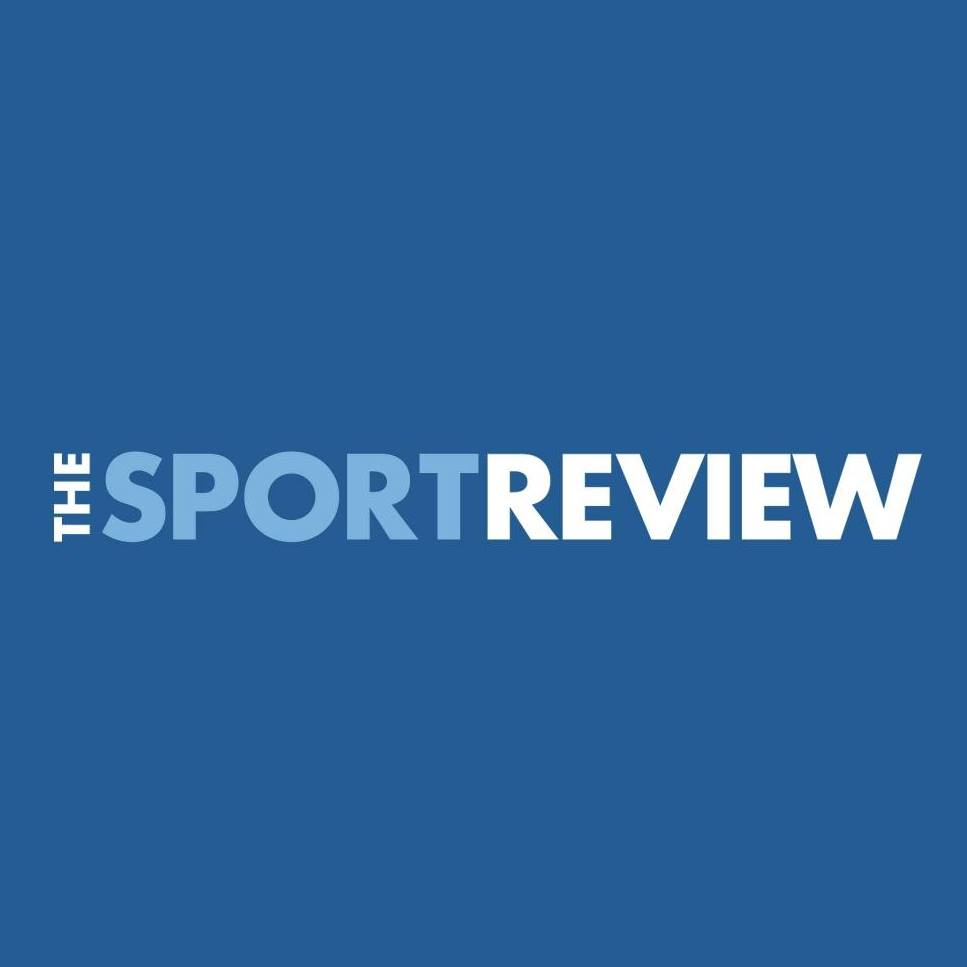
- Website type: Sports media
- Available in: English (UK)
- Owner: GRV Media Ltd
- Editor: Kieran Smith
- Website: www.thesportreview.com
- Commercial: Yes
- Launched: November 16, 2008; 17 years ago
- Current status: Online

The Sport Review (thesportreview.com) is a sport news website founded in 2008 and based in London.

The site primarily covers the most popular sports in the United Kingdom, including football, tennis, rugby union, cricket and Formula 1.

It was founded in November 2008 by journalists Martin Caparrotta and Kieran Beckles.

Some of the original regular features on the site included 'The Grapevine' - an interactive football transfer gossip column, and 'Short and Tweet' - a round-up of Twitter updates from sports stars and celebrities following headline sporting events.

The site won the 2010 Bright Ideas Award at University College London.

In May 2025, GRV Media acquired The Sport Review, including its website, brand, and associated media assets. The platform will be operated by GRV Media as a non-football sports news outlet.
