= Best Outdoor Sportsman ESPY Award =

Annual athletic award (2002–2008)

- Awarded for: best outdoor sportsperson
- Location: Los Angeles (2008)
- Presented by: ESPN
- First award: 2002
- Final award: 2008
- Currently held by: Scott Smiley (USA)
- Website: www.espn.co.uk/espys/

The Best Outdoor Sportsman ESPY Award was an annual award honoring the achievements of an athlete from the world of outdoor sports —understood as those related to outdoor recreation and nature-based occupation, including sport fishing, most especially of bass, and lumberjacking, most especially the logrolling, wood chopping, and high-climbing disciplines thereof—on an amateur or professional level primarily in the United States or Canada. It was first presented as part of the ESPY Awards at the 2002 edition after broadcaster ESPN purchased the Bass Anglers Sportsman Society in mid-2001. The Best Outdoor Sportsman ESPY Award trophy, designed by sculptor Lawrence Nowlan, was given to the outdoor sportsperson adjudged to be the best in a given calendar year. From the 2004 to 2008 ceremonies, the winner was chosen by online voting through choices selected by the ESPN Select Nominating Committee. Before that, determination of the winners was made by an panel of experts. Through the 2001 iteration of the ESPY Awards, ceremonies were conducted in February of each year to honor achievements over the previous calendar year; awards presented thereafter are conferred in July and reflect performance from the June previous. (Note: Because of the rescheduling of the ESPY Awards ceremony, the award presented in 2002 was given in consideration of performance between February 2001 and June 2002.)

The inaugural winner of the Best Outdoor Sportsman ESPY Award in 2002 was American bass angler Kevin VanDam. During 2001 and 2002, he won the Bassmaster Classic XXXI, the 2001 Wal-Mart FLW Championship, and attained the rank of the top-ranked angler worldwide during that period. VanDam became the first of two bass anglers to be nominated, and hence to win, an ESPY Award. Bass anglers have been the most successful sportspeople (with two victories and eight nominations) with the win of Jay Yelas at the 2003 iteration. It was presented to one woman in its history, logroller Tina Bosworth, in the 2004 edition. The winner of the Best Outdoor Sportsman ESPY Award in 2005 was lumberjacker J. R. Salzman after winning 14 medals at the Great Outdoor Games and claimed five logrolling titles at the Lumberjack World Championship between 1998 and 2005. After that, the accolade was partially replaced by the Best Angler ESPY Award for the 2006 edition before returning the next year. It was permanently discontinued after the 2008 ceremony.

== Winners and nominees ==
Best Outdoor Sportsman ESPY Award winners and nominees
Year	Image	Athlete	Nationality	Sport	Nominees	Refs
2002	Kevin VanDam in 2012	Kevin VanDam	USA	Bass angling	Rick Clunn (USA) – Bass angling Jerry "the big air dog" (USA) – Dock jumping Mel Lentz (USA) – Lumberjacking	
2003		Jay Yelas	USA	Bass angling	Jerry Day/Super Sue (USA) – Field trial Jerry Miculek (USA) – Shooting; Mike Jackson/Little Morgan (USA) – Dock jumping Sheree Taylor (NZL) – Timber endurance	
2004		Tina Bosworth	USA	Log rolling	Denny Brauer (USA) – Bass angling Michael Iaconelli (USA) – Bass angling Gerald Swindle (USA) – Bass angling	
2005	J.R. Salzman learning to dive with the help of an instructor in 2007	J.R. Salzman	USA	Lumberjacking	Aaron Martens (USA) – Bass angling Takahiro Omori (JPN) – Bass angling Sheree Taylor (NZL) – Timber endurance	
2007	Dean Karnazes signing books before a marathon event in 2008	Dean Karnazes	USA	Ultramarathon	Michael Iaconelli (USA) – Bass angling Samantha Larson (USA) – Mountaineering; Lance Mackey (USA) – Mushing; Ian McKeever (IRL) – Mountaineering	
2008		Scotty Smiley	USA	Mountaineering	Dave Hahn (USA) – Mountaineering; Lance Mackey (USA) – Mushing; Skeet Reese (USA) – Bass angling Skip Storch (USA) – Swimming	

== See also ==
- Bassmaster Classic
- Great Outdoor Games
- Lumberjack World Championships
- Sport fishing
