= Best Breakthrough Athlete ESPY Award =

Annual athletic award

- Awarded for: best national or international breakthrough in the world of individual and team sports
- Location: Dolby Theatre, Los Angeles (2023)
- Presented by: ESPN
- First award: 1993
- Currently held by: Alysa Liu (USA)
- Website: www.espn.co.uk/espys/

The Best Breakthrough Athlete ESPY Award, known alternatively as the Breakthrough Athlete of the Year ESPY Award, is an annual award honoring the achievements of an individual in the world of sports. It was first awarded as part of the ESPY Awards in 1993. The Best Breakthrough Athlete ESPY Award trophy, created by sculptor Lawrence Nowlan, is awarded to the sportsperson adjudged to have made the greatest breakthrough in a major international individual sport or North American professional team sport. The award is typically given to a sportsperson in their rookie season at a given level but may be won by any athlete whose performance dramatically or otherwise becomes well-recognized. Since 2004, the winner has been chosen by online voting through choices selected by the ESPN Select Nominating Committee. Before that, determination of the winners was made by an panel of experts. Through the 2001 iteration of the ESPY Awards, ceremonies were conducted in February of each year to honor achievements over the previous calendar year; awards presented thereafter are conferred in July and reflect performance from the June previous. (Note: Because of the rescheduling of the ESPY Awards ceremony, the award presented in 2002 was given in consideration of performance betwixt February 2001 and June 2002.)

The inaugural winner of the Best Breakthrough Athlete ESPY Award in 1993 was San Diego Padres outfielder Gary Sheffield. The Los Angeles Dodgers pitcher Hideo Nomo of Japan received the trophy in 1996, and is one of two sports persons born outside of the United States to have received the award, the other being Dominican Republican left fielder and second baseman Alfonso Soriano of the New York Yankees in 2003. Additionally, 2022 winner Eileen Gu was born in America, but competed for China. Gu is one of two women to win the award, the other being Mo'ne Davis of the Little League Baseball team Anderson Monarchs in 2015. American football players have been most successful at the awards with eleven victories and thirteen nominations, followed by baseball players with eight wins and ten nominations. No athlete has ever won the accolade more than once. The award was not awarded in 2020 due to the COVID-19 pandemic.

== Winners and nominees ==
Best Breakthrough Athlete ESPY Award winners and nominees
Year	Image	Athlete	Nationality	Team	Competition	Sport	Nominees	Refs
1993	Gary Sheffield holding his baseball helmet at a game in 2005	Gary Sheffield	USA	San Diego Padres	Major League Baseball	Baseball	Fred Couples (USA) – Golf; Jim Courier (USA) – Tennis; Barry Foster (USA) – Pittsburgh Steelers	
1994	Mike Piazza before the start of the 2016 Baseball Hall of Fame	Mike Piazza	USA	Los Angeles Dodgers	Major League Baseball	Baseball	—N/a	
1995	Jeff Bagwell walking on a baseball pitch in 2009	Jeff Bagwell	USA	Houston Astros	Major League Baseball	Baseball	Ernie Els (RSA) – Golf; Tommy Moe (USA) – Skiing	
1996	Hideo Nomo at a baseball training pitch in 2011	Hideo Nomo	JPN	Los Angeles Dodgers	Major League Baseball	Baseball	Jeff Blake (USA) –Cincinnati Bengals; Martin Brodeur (CAN) – New Jersey Devils	
1997	Tiger Woods speaking to the media at a press conference in 2009	Tiger Woods	USA	—N/a	PGA Tour	Golf	Mariano Rivera (PAN) – New York Yankees; Alex Rodriguez (USA) – Seattle Mariners	
1998	Nomar Garciaparra talking to a journalist in 2010	Nomar Garciaparra	USA	Boston Red Sox	Major League Baseball	Baseball	—N/a	
1999	Randy Moss before a pre-season game with the New England Patriots in 2009	Randy Moss	USA	Minnesota Vikings	National Football League	American football	—N/a	
2000	Kurt Warner at a pre-game event in 2004	Kurt Warner	USA	St. Louis Rams	National Football League	American football	Sergio García (SPA) – Golf; Serena Williams (USA) – Tennis	
2001		Daunte Culpepper	USA	Minnesota Vikings	National Football League	American football	Rulon Gardner (USA) – Wrestling; Josh Heupel (USA) – Oklahoma Sooners; Marat Safin (RUS) – Tennis	
2002	Tom Brady playing for the New England Patriots in 2011	Tom Brady	USA	New England Patriots	National Football League	American football	Kevin Harvick (USA) – NASCAR; Sarah Hughes (USA) – Figure skating Ichiro Suzuki (JPN) – Seattle Mariners	
2003	Alfonso Soriano in 2006	Alfonso Soriano	DOM	New York Yankees	Major League Baseball	Baseball	LeBron James (USA) – Cleveland Cavaliers; Jimmie Johnson (USA) – NASCAR; Yao Ming (CHN) – Houston Rockets; Clinton Portis (USA) – Denver Broncos	
2004	LeBron James playing for the Cleveland Cavaliers in 2006	LeBron James	USA	Cleveland Cavaliers	National Basketball Association	Basketball	Freddy Adu (USA) – Soccer; Carmelo Anthony (USA) – Denver Nuggets; Jake Delhomme (USA) – Carolina Panthers; Michelle Wie (USA) – Golf	
2005	Photographic portrait of Dwyane Wade in 2005	Dwyane Wade	USA	Miami Heat	National Basketball Association	Basketball	Danica Patrick (USA) – IndyCar Series; Ben Roethlisberger (USA) – Pittsburgh Steelers; Maria Sharapova (RUS) – Tennis	
2006	Chris Paul playing for the Los Angeles Clippers in 2013	Chris Paul	USA	New Orleans Hornets	National Basketball Association	Basketball	Kimmie Meissner (USA) – Figure skating Alexander Ovechkin (RUS) – Washington Capitals; Shaun White (USA) – Snowboarding	
2007	Devin Hester playing for the Chicago Bears in 2008	Devin Hester	USA	Chicago Bears	National Football League	American football	Kevin Durant (USA) – Texas Longhorns; Ryan Howard (USA) – Philadelphia Phillies; Morgan Pressel (USA) – Golf	
2008	Adrian Peterson in Minnesota Vikings uniform in 2009	Adrian Peterson	USA	Minnesota Vikings	National Football League	American football	Kyle Busch (USA) – NASCAR; Stephen Curry (USA) – Davidson Wildcats; Ana Ivanovic (SER) – Tennis	
2009	Matt Ryan in public in 2015	Matt Ryan	USA	Atlanta Falcons	National Football League	American football	Shawn Johnson (USA) – Gymnastics; Evan Longoria (USA) – Tampa Bay Rays; Derrick Rose (USA) – Chicago Bulls	
2010	Chris Johnson sitting on his guard helmet at an American football game in 2010	Chris Johnson	USA	Tennessee Titans	National Football League	American football	Brittney Griner (USA) – Baylor Bears; Stephen Strasburg (USA) – Washington Nationals; John Wall (USA) – Kentucky Wildcats	
2011	Blake Griffin playing for the Los Angeles Clippers in 2011	Blake Griffin	USA	Los Angeles Clippers	National Basketball Association	Basketball	José Bautista (DOM) – Toronto Blue Jays; Arian Foster (USA) – Houston Texans; Li Na (CHN) – Tennis; Cam Newton (USA) – Auburn Tigers	
2012	Jeremy Lin at the 2012 Time 100 Gala	Jeremy Lin	USA	New York Knicks	National Basketball Association	Basketball	Anthony Davis (USA) – Kentucky Wildcats; Robert Griffin III (USA) – Baylor Bears; Rob Gronkowski (USA) – New England Patriots; Alex Morgan (USA) – Soccer	
2013	Colin Kaepernick wearing San Francisco 49ers uniform at a game in 2012	Colin Kaepernick	USA	San Francisco 49ers	National Football League	American football	Johnny Manziel (USA) – Texas A&M Aggies; Yasiel Puig (CUB) – Los Angeles Dodgers; Mike Trout (USA) – Los Angeles Angels; Russell Wilson (USA) – Seattle Seahawks	
2014	Richard Sherman in a preseason game with the Seattle Seahawks in 2015	Richard Sherman	USA	Seattle Seahawks	National Football League	American football	Nick Foles (USA) – Philadelphia Eagles; Damian Lillard (USA) – Portland Trail Blazers; Masahiro Tanaka (JPN) – New York Yankees	
2015	Mo'ne Davis attending the 2014 National Christmas Tree lighting ceremony	Mo'ne Davis	USA	Anderson Monarchs	Little League Baseball	Baseball	Odell Beckham Jr. (USA) – New York Giants; Cardale Jones (USA) – Ohio State Buckeyes; Jordan Spieth (USA) – Golf	
2016	Jake Arrieta performing a warmup pitch for the Chicago Cubs in 2018	Jake Arrieta	USA	Chicago Cubs	Major League Baseball	Baseball	Karl-Anthony Towns (USA) – Minnesota Timberwolves; Chloe Kim (USA) – Snowboarding; Conor McGregor (IRL) – MMA	
2017	Dak Prescott playing for the Dallas Cowboys in 2017	Dak Prescott	USA	Dallas Cowboys	National Football League	American football	Giannis Antetokounmpo (GRE) – Milwaukee Bucks; Laurie Hernandez (USA) – Gymnastics; Aaron Judge (USA) – New York Yankees; Christian Pulisic (USA) – Soccer	
2018	Donovan Mitchell in a Utah Jazz jersey in 2018	Donovan Mitchell	USA	Utah Jazz	National Basketball Association	Basketball	Alvin Kamara (USA) – New Orleans Saints; Ben Simmons (AUS) – Philadelphia 76ers Sloane Stephens (USA) – Tennis	
2019	Saquon Barkley playing for the New York Giants in 2018	Saquon Barkley	USA	New York Giants	National Football League	American football	Naomi Osaka (JPN) – Tennis; Christian Yelich (USA) – Milwaukee Brewers; Trae Young (USA) – Atlanta Hawks	
2020	Not awarded due to the COVID-19 pandemic							
2021		LaMelo Ball	USA	Charlotte Hornets	National Basketball Association	Basketball	Justin Herbert (USA) – Los Angeles Chargers; Chase Young (USA) – Washington Football Team; Crystal Dangerfield (USA) – Minnesota Lynx	
2022		Eileen Gu	CHN	—N/a	—N/a	Skiing	Ja Morant (USA) – Memphis Grizzlies; Trinity Rodman (USA) Washington Spirit; Jonathan Taylor (USA) Indianapolis Colts	
2023		Angel Reese	USA	LSU Women's Basketball	NCAA Division I	Basketball	Caitlin Clark (USA) – Iowa Women's Basketball; Brock Purdy (USA) San Francisco 49ers Julio Rodríguez (DOM) Seattle Mariners	
2024		JuJu Watkins	USA	USC Women's Basketball	NCAA Division I	Basketball	Haleigh Bryant (USA) – LSU women's gymnastics C. J. Stroud (USA) Houston Texans; Victor Wembanyama (FRA) San Antonio Spurs	
2025		Ilona Maher	USA	Bristol Bears	Premiership Women's Rugby	Rugby union	Cooper Flagg (USA) – Duke men's basketball Chloe Humphrey (USA) – North Carolina women's lacrosse Paul Skenes (USA) – Pittsburgh Pirates	
2026		Alysa Liu	USA	—N/a	Figure skating at the Olympic Games	Figure skating	Fernando Mendoza (USA) – Indiana Hoosiers football Drake Maye (USA) – New England Patriots; Macklin Celebrini (CAN) – San Jose Sharks	

== See also ==
- Laureus World Sports Award for Breakthrough of the Year
- ATP Newcomer of the Year Award
- Calder Memorial Trophy (National Hockey League)
- MLB Rookie of the Year Award
- MLS Rookie of the Year Award
- NASCAR Rookie of the Year Award
- NBA Rookie of the Year Award
- NFL Rookie of the Year Award
- PGA Tour Rookie of the Year Award
