= Best Game ESPY Award =

Annual athletic award

- Awarded for: best professional or collegiate game
- Location: Microsoft Theater, Los Angeles (2017)
- Presented by: ESPN
- First award: 2002
- Currently held by: 2022 NFL AFC Divisional Game: Chiefs vs Bills
- Website: www.espn.com/espys/

The Best Game ESPY Award is an annual award honoring the achievements of a team who has performed the best play in the world of sports. It was first awarded as part of the ESPY Awards in 2002. The Best Game ESPY Award trophy, designed by sculptor Lawrence Nowlan, is awarded to the team on the single regular season or playoff game contested professionally under the auspices of one of the four major North American leagues or collegiately under the auspices of the National Collegiate Athletic Association adjudged, in view of its quality, competitiveness, excitement, and significance, to be the best. Since 2004, the winner has been chosen by online voting through choices selected by the ESPN Select Nominating Committee. Before that, determination of the winners was made by an panel of experts. Through the 2001 iteration of the ESPY Awards, ceremonies were conducted in February of each year to honor achievements over the previous calendar year; awards presented thereafter are conferred in July and reflect performance from the June previous. (Note: Because of the rescheduling of the ESPY Awards ceremony, the award presented in 2002 was given in consideration of performance betwixt February 2001 and June 2002.)

The inaugural winner of the Best Game ESPY Award in 2002 was the seventh game of the 2001 World Series which decided that year's baseball title in favour of the expansion team Arizona Diamondbacks over the New York Yankees. The following year's recipient of the accolade went to Ohio State University Buckeyes in their 2003 Fiesta Bowl victory over the University of Miami Hurricanes. College football games have won the award three times and earned another two nominations after American football which has the most wins of any other sport with eight awards and six nominations while basketball and ice hockey games each have one victory each. The 2018 winner of the Best Game ESPY Award is the 2018 Winter Olympics women's ice hockey gold medal game in which the United States team won against Canada's squad in a 3–2 shootout victory to claim their first gold medal in women's ice hockey since the 1998 Winter Games. The award wasn't awarded in 2020 due to the COVID-19 pandemic, in 2023, 2024 or 2025.

== Winners and nominees ==
Best Game ESPY Award winners and nominees
Year	Game/event	Date	League/governing body	Sport	Winners	Losers	Score	Nominees	Refs
2002	2001 World Series, game seven	November 4, 2001	Major League Baseball	Baseball	Arizona Diamondbacks	New York Yankees	3–2	Super Bowl XXXVI – New England Patriots vs. St. Louis Rams; Women's Olympic Figure Skating at the 2002 Winter Olympics	
2003	2003 Fiesta Bowl	January 3, 2003	NCAA Division I-A	College football	Ohio State University Buckeyes	University of Miami Hurricanes	31–24 (double overtime)	2003 Australian Open – Men's singles: Andy Roddick vs. Younes El Aynaoui; 2002 NFC wild card game – San Francisco 49ers vs. New York Giants; 2002 World Series, game six – Anaheim Angels vs. San Francisco Giants	
2004	Super Bowl XXXVIII	February 1, 2004	National Football League	American football	New England Patriots	Carolina Panthers	32–29	2003 ALCS, game seven – New York Yankees vs. Boston Red Sox; 2003 Little League World Series – Saugus vs. Richmond; 2004 NCAA Division I men's basketball tournament – Saint Joseph's vs. Oklahoma State	
2005	2004 American League Championship Series, game five	October 18, 2004	Major League Baseball	Baseball	Boston Red Sox	New York Yankees	5–4	2005 Rose Bowl – Michigan Wolverines vs. Texas Longhorns; 2005 NCAA Division I men's basketball tournament –Michigan vs. Kentucky	
2006	2006 Rose Bowl	January 4, 2006	NCAA Division I-A	College football	University of Texas Longhorns	University of Southern California Trojans	41–38	Houston Astros vs. Atlanta Braves – National League Division Series, game four Andre Agassi vs. James Blake – 2005 US Open Quarter-Finals	
2007	2007 Fiesta Bowl	January 1, 2007	NCAA Division I FBS	College football	Boise State University Broncos	University of Oklahoma Sooners	43–42 (overtime)	2007 AFC Championship Game – Indianapolis Colts vs. New England Patriots; Oklahoma State vs. Texas triple overtime game	
2008	Super Bowl XLII	February 3, 2008	National Football League	American football	New York Giants	New England Patriots	17–14	2008 NBA Finals, game four – Boston Celtics vs. Los Angeles Lakers; 2008 NCAA Division I Men's Basketball Championship Game	
2009	Super Bowl XLIII	February 1, 2009	National Football League	American football	Pittsburgh Steelers	Arizona Cardinals	27–23	Roger Federer vs. Rafael Nadal – 2008 Wimbledon men's singles final 2009 Connecticut vs. Syracuse men's basketball game	
2010	Winter Olympics men's hockey gold-medal game	February 28, 2010	International Olympic Committee	Ice hockey	Canada	United States	3–2 (overtime)	2009 American League Central tie-breaker game – Detroit Tigers vs. Minnesota Twins; 2010 NCAA Division I Men's Basketball Championship Game – Duke Blue Devils vs. Butler Bulldogs	
2011	NFL Week 15 game	December 19, 2010	National Football League	American football	Philadelphia Eagles	New York Giants	38–31	2010 Iron Bowl – Alabama Crimson Tide vs. Auburn Tigers; Butler Bulldogs' upset against Pittsburgh Panthers; Oklahoma City edges Memphis in the NBA Playoffs	
2012	2012 NFC Divisional Playoffs	January 14, 2012	National Football League	American football	San Francisco 49ers	New Orleans Saints	36–32	2011 World Series, game six – St. Louis Cardinals vs. Texas Rangers; Kansas Jayhawks 87–86 Missouri Tigers	
2013	2013 NBA Finals, game six	June 18, 2013	National Basketball Association	Basketball	Miami Heat	San Antonio Spurs	103–100	2013 Stanley Cup playoffs – Boston Bruins vs Toronto Maple Leafs; Mile High Miracle – Baltimore Ravens vs. Denver Broncos	
2014	2013 Iron Bowl	November 30, 2013	NCAA Division I FBS	American football	Auburn Tigers	Alabama Crimson Tide	34–28	2014 Stanley Cup Final, game five – New York Rangers vs. Los Angeles Kings; 2014 AFC Wild Card Game – Indianapolis Colts vs. Kansas City Chiefs	
2015	Super Bowl XLIX	February 1, 2015	National Football League	American football	New England Patriots	Seattle Seahawks	28–24	2014 American League Wild Card Game – Oakland Athletics vs. Kansas City Royals; 2015 NBA Western Conference Semifinals – San Antonio Spurs vs. Los Angeles Clippers	
2016	2016 NBA Finals, game seven	June 19, 2016	National Basketball Association	Basketball	Cleveland Cavaliers	Golden State Warriors	93–89	2015 NFL Playoffs – Arizona Cardinals vs. Green Bay Packers; 2016 NCAA Division I men's basketball tournament – Villanova Wildcats vs. North Carolina Tar Heels	
2017	Super Bowl LI	February 5, 2017	National Football League	American football	New England Patriots	Atlanta Falcons	34–28 (overtime)	2016 World Series, game seven – Chicago Cubs vs. Cleveland Indians; 2017 Australian Open – Men's singles final: Roger Federer vs. Rafael Nadal	
2018	2018 Winter Olympics women's ice hockey gold medal game	February 23, 2018	International Olympic Committee	Ice hockey	United States women's national ice hockey team	Canada women's national ice hockey team	3–2 (Shootout)	2017 World Series, game five – Houston Astros vs. Los Angeles Dodgers; 2018 Rose Bowl between the Georgia Bulldogs and Oklahoma Sooners	
2019	2018 Kansas City Chiefs–Los Angeles Rams game	November 19, 2018	National Football League	American Football	Los Angeles Rams	Kansas City Chiefs	54–51	2018 game between the Texas A&M Aggies and LSU Tigers and the 2019 Women's Final Four game between the Notre Dame Fighting Irish and the Connecticut Huskies.	
2020	Not awarded due to the COVID-19 pandemic								
2021	2021 NCAA Division I men's basketball tournament	April 3, 2021	NCAA	College basketball	Gonzaga	UCLA	93–90 (overtime)	2021 NCAA Division I women's basketball tournament national championship game between Stanford and Arizona, the 2020 NFL game between the Baltimore Ravens and Cleveland Browns and Game 4 of the 2021 Stanley Cup playoffs between the Winnipeg Jets and the Edmonton Oilers.	
2022	2022 NFL playoffs AFC Divisional Game	January 23, 2022	National Football League	American football	Kansas City Chiefs	Buffalo Bills	42–36 (overtime)	2022 NCAA Division I women's basketball tournament game between UConn and NC State, the 2022 NCAA Division I Men's Basketball Championship Game between the North Carolina Tar Heels and Kansas Jayhawks and the November 21, 2021 Iron Bowl game between the Alabama Crimson Tide and the Auburn Tigers.	
2023	Not awarded								
2024	Not awarded								

== See also ==
- Best Upset ESPY Award
- Outstanding Team ESPY Award
