= Best Female Soccer Player ESPY Award =

Annual athletic award

The Best Female Soccer Player ESPY Award was presented annually between 2002 and 2004 to the female soccer player adjudged to be the best in a given calendar year among those contesting the sport on the professional or international level. The award—and the Best Male Soccer Player ESPY Award—evolved from the Best Soccer Player ESPY Award, which was awarded in 2000 and 2001, and the latter once more absorbed the gender-specific awards in 2005.

During the award's three years, the voting panel comprised variously fans, who participated through Internet balloting; sportswriters and broadcasters, sports executives, and retired sportspersons, termed collectively experts; and ESPN personalities. The ESPY Awards ceremony was conducted in June and awards conferred reflected performance and achievement over the twelve months previous to presentation.

While this specific award is no longer presented, two separate ESPY Awards are now presented to women's soccer players:

- Best NWSL Player ESPY Award, presented since 2018 to the best player, regardless of nationality, in the National Women's Soccer League.
- ESPY Award for Best International Athlete, Women's Soccer, first presented in 2018 to the best women's player who competes for a club located outside of the United States, regardless of the player's nationality.

== List of winners ==
Year	Player	National team represented	Club team represented	Position primarily played
2002	Tiffeny Milbrett	United States	New York Power	Forward
2003	Kátia	Brazil	San Jose CyberRays	Forward
2004	Mia Hamm	United States	None	Forward

== See also ==
- List of sports awards honoring women
- FIFA Women's World Cup Awards
- FIFA World Player of the Year
