= Best Soccer Player ESPY Award =

Annual athletic award

- Awarded for: best soccer player
- Presented by: ESPN
- First award: 2000
- Currently held by: Lionel Messi
- Website: www.espn.co.uk/espys/

The Best Soccer Player ESPY Award, is an annual award honoring the achievements of an individual from the world of soccers. It was first awarded as part of the ESPY Awards in 2000. The awards discontinued in (2002–2005, 2007–2022) but was awarded again in 2023.

== List of winners ==
| Year | Player | National team represented | Club team represented | Position played primarily |
|---|---|---|---|---|
| 2000 | Mia Hamm | United States | None | Forward |
| 2001 | Mia Hamm | United States | Washington Freedom | Forward |
| 2002–2004 | Not awarded | | | |
| 2005 | Mia Hamm | United States | None | Forward |
| 2006 | Ronaldinho | Brazil | FC Barcelona | Forward |
| 2023 | Lionel Messi | Argentina | Paris Saint-Germain | Forward |
| 2024 | Kylian Mbappé | France | Real Madrid | Forward |
| 2025 | Christian Pulisic | United States | AC Milan | Forward |
| 2026 | Lionel Messi | Argentina | Inter Miami | Forward |

== See also ==
- Landon Donovan MVP Award (Major League Soccer MVP Award)
- FIFA World Player of the Year
- FIFA Women's World Cup awards
- FIFA World Cup awards
- African Footballer of the Year
- Asian Footballer of the Year
- European Footballer of the Year
- Oceania Footballer of the Year
- South American Footballer of the Year
