= 2016 ESPY Awards =

Athletic awards show

- Date: July 13, 2016
- Location: Microsoft Theater, Los Angeles
- Country: United States
- Hosted by: John Cena

Highlights
- Most awards: LeBron James
- Most nominations: LeBron James

Television/radio coverage
- Network: ABC
- Runtime: 180 minutes

The 2016 ESPY Awards were held on July 13, 2016. The show, hosted by professional wrestler John Cena, was held in the Microsoft Theater in Los Angeles, California. 31 competitive awards and eight honorary awards were presented.

== Winners and nominees ==
Winners are listed first and highlighted in boldface.

**Best Male Athlete**: **LeBron James – Cleveland Cavaliers, NBA**; Stephen Curry – Golden State Warriors, NBA; Cam Newton – Carolina Panthers, NFL; Bryce Harper – Washington Nationals, MLB	**Best Female Athlete**: **Breanna Stewart – UConn Women's Basketball**; Elena Delle Donne – Chicago Sky; Katie Ledecky – Olympic Swimmer; Simone Biles – Gymnast
**Best Championship Performance**: **LeBron James, Cleveland Cavaliers** – 2016 NBA Finals; Von Miller, Denver Broncos – 2016 Super Bowl; Carli Lloyd, USWNT – 2015 FIFA Women's World Cup; Sidney Crosby, Pittsburgh Penguins – 2016 Stanley Cup Playoffs	**Best Breakthrough Athlete**: **Jake Arrieta, Chicago Cubs**; Conor McGregor, UFC; Chloe Kim, snowboarder; Karl-Anthony Towns, Minnesota Timberwolves
**Best Record-Breaking Performance**: **Stephen Curry** – single season three-pointers made; Geno Auriemma, Connecticut Huskies women's basketball – most NCAA Division I basketball titles in history; Christian McCaffrey, Stanford Cardinal football – single season NCAAF all-purpose yards	**Best Upset**: **Holly Holm knocks out Ronda Rousey – UFC**; Middle Tennessee beats Michigan State – 2016 NCAA Men's Division I Basketball Tournament; Roberta Vinci defeats Serena Williams – 2015 US Open – Women's Singles
**Best Game**: **Golden State Warriors vs. Cleveland Cavaliers – Game 7, 2016 NBA Finals**; Villanova Wildcats vs. North Carolina Tar Heels – 2016 NCAA Men's Division I Basketball Tournament; Arizona Cardinals vs. Green Bay Packers – 2015 NFL playoffs	**Best Play**: **Aaron Rodgers – Hail Mary pass to Richard Rodgers against Detroit**; Kris Jenkins, Villanova – buzzer beater in NCAA championship game; Michigan State – punt block TD in the final seconds to defeat Michigan; LeBron James – Game 7 block; Stephen Curry – 38-foot game-winner; Holly Holm – knockout of Ronda Rousey; Tiffany Howard – HR robbery in the Women's College World Series; Jairo Samperio – scores on scissor-kick ground; Dele Alli – juggling goal for Tottenham; Josh Donaldson – diving into stands; Bartolo Colón – first career home run; oldest MLB player ever to hit his first homer; Army softball – player leaps over tag at home; Louis Oosthuizen – hole-in-one off of ball; Stanford – trick play w/ circus catch; Connor McDavid – goal; Ole Miss – crazy 66-yard TD
**Best Team**: **Cleveland Cavaliers – NBA**; Pittsburgh Penguins – NHL; Kansas City Royals – MLB; Alabama Crimson Tide – NCAA Division I FBS football; Connecticut Huskies – NCAA Division I women's basketball; Villanova Wildcats – NCAA Division I men's basketball; Denver Broncos – NFL	**Best Coach/Manager**: **Tyronn Lue – Cleveland Cavaliers**; Ned Yost – Kansas City Royals; Geno Auriemma – Connecticut Huskies women's basketball; Jay Wright – Villanova Wildcats men's basketball; Nick Saban – Alabama Crimson Tide football
**Best International Athlete**: **Cristiano Ronaldo – Real Madrid/Portugal**; Novak Djokovic – Tennis; Lydia Ko – LPGA; Luis Suárez – FC Barcelona/Uruguay; Canelo Álvarez – Boxing	**Best NFL player**: **Cam Newton, Carolina Panthers** – 2015 NFL Most Valuable Player; Tom Brady, New England Patriots – 2015 Second-team All-Pro; J. J. Watt, Houston Texans – NFL Defensive Player of the Year; Antonio Brown, Pittsburgh Steelers – Career highs in receptions (136) and receiving yards (1,834); Julio Jones, Atlanta Falcons – Career highs in receptions (136) and receiving yards (1,871)
**Best MLB player**: **Bryce Harper, Washington Nationals** – Unanimous 2015 National League MVP; Josh Donaldson, Toronto Blue Jays – 2015 American League MVP; Jake Arrieta, Chicago Cubs – 2015 National League Cy Young Award winner; Mike Trout, Los Angeles Angels of Anaheim – 2015 Silver Slugger Award winner; Clayton Kershaw, Los Angeles Dodgers – 2015 strikeout leader	**Best NHL Player**: **Sidney Crosby, Pittsburgh Penguins** – Winner of the 2016 Conn Smythe Trophy (playoffs MVP); Patrick Kane, Chicago Blackhawks – Winner of the 2016 Art Ross Trophy (leading scorer), Ted Lindsay Award (most outstanding player), and Hart Memorial Trophy (NHL MVP); Alexander Ovechkin, Washington Capitals – Winner of the 2016 Maurice "Rocket" Richard Trophy (most goals); Joe Pavelski, San Jose Sharks – Leading goal scorer of the Stanley Cup playoffs (14); Braden Holtby, Washington Capitals – Winner of the 2016 Vezina Trophy (best goaltender)
**Best Driver**: **Kyle Busch, NASCAR** – 2015 NASCAR Sprint Cup Champion; Lewis Hamilton, Formula One – 2015 Formula One World Champion; Erica Enders-Stevens, NHRA – Won the 2015 NHRA Pro Stock Championship; Scott Dixon, IndyCar – 2015 IndyCar Series Champion; Alexander Rossi, IndyCar – 2016 Indy 500 winner	**Best NBA player**: **LeBron James, Cleveland Cavaliers** – 2016 Finals MVP; Stephen Curry, Golden State Warriors – 2016 MVP; Kawhi Leonard, San Antonio Spurs – 2016 Defensive Player of the Year; Kevin Durant, Oklahoma City Thunder – 2016 NBA All-Star; Russell Westbrook, Oklahoma City Thunder – 2016 All-Star Game MVP
**Best WNBA Player**: **Maya Moore, Minnesota Lynx** – 2015 All-Star MVP; Elena Delle Donne, Chicago Sky – 2015 WNBA MVP; Angel McCoughtry, Atlanta Dream – 2015 NBA steals leader; Tina Charles, New York Liberty – 2015 All-WNBA First Team; DeWanna Bonner, Phoenix Mercury – 2015 All-WNBA First Team	**Best Fighter**: **Conor McGregor, UFC**; Gennady Golovkin, WBC; Canelo Álvarez, WBC; Robbie Lawler, UFC; Román González, WBA
**Best Male Golfer**: **Jordan Spieth**; Jason Day; Dustin Johnson; Danny Willett	**Best Female Golfer**: **Lydia Ko**; Inbee Park; Brooke Henderson; Ariya Jutanugarn
**Best Male Tennis Player**: **Novak Djokovic**; Andy Murray; Roger Federer	**Best Female Tennis Player**: **Serena Williams**; Angelique Kerber; Flavia Pennetta; Garbiñe Muguruza
**Best Male College Athlete**: **Buddy Hield, Oklahoma Sooners basketball**; Derrick Henry, Alabama Crimson Tide football; Jordan Morris, Stanford Cardinal soccer; Jarrion Lawson, Arkansas Razorbacks track & field; Alex Dieringer, Oklahoma State Cowboys wrestling	**Best Female College Athlete**: **Breanna Stewart, UConn Huskies basketball**; Raquel Rodríguez, Penn State Nittany Lions soccer; Samantha Bricio, USC Trojans indoor volleyball; Taylor Cummings, Maryland Terrapins women's lacrosse; Sierra Romero, Michigan Wolverines softball
**Best Male Action Sports Athlete**: **Ryan Dungey, American Motorcyclist Association**; Gus Kenworthy, Freestyle skier; Nyjah Huston, Skateboarder; Pedro Barros, Skateboarder; Mark McMorris, Snowboarder	**Best Female Action Sports Athlete**: **Jamie Anderson, Snowboarder**; Chloe Kim, snowboarder; Keala Kennelly, Surfer; Carissa Moore, Surfer
**Best Jockey**: **Mario Gutierrez**; Kent Desormeaux; Javier Castellano; Irad Ortiz Jr.	**Best Male Athlete with a Disability**: **Richard Browne, Sprint runner**; Jo Berenyi, Track and road cyclist; Aaron Fotheringham, Skateboarding and BMX tricks; Nikko Landeros, Ice sledge hockey player; Brad Snyder, Swimmer
**Best Female Athlete with a Disability**: **Tatyana McFadden**; Heather Erickson, Volleyball player; Oksana Masters, Rower and Cross-country Skier; Shawn Morelli	**Best Bowler**: **Jason Belmonte, Bowling**; Jesper Svensson, Bowling; Ryan Ciminelli, Bowling; Anthony Simonsen, Bowling
**Best MLS Player**: **Sebastian Giovinco, Toronto FC**; Kei Kamara, New England Revolution; Laurent Ciman, Montreal Impact; Luis Robles, New York Red Bulls	**Best Comeback Athlete**: **Eric Berry, Kansas City Chiefs**

== Honorary awards ==
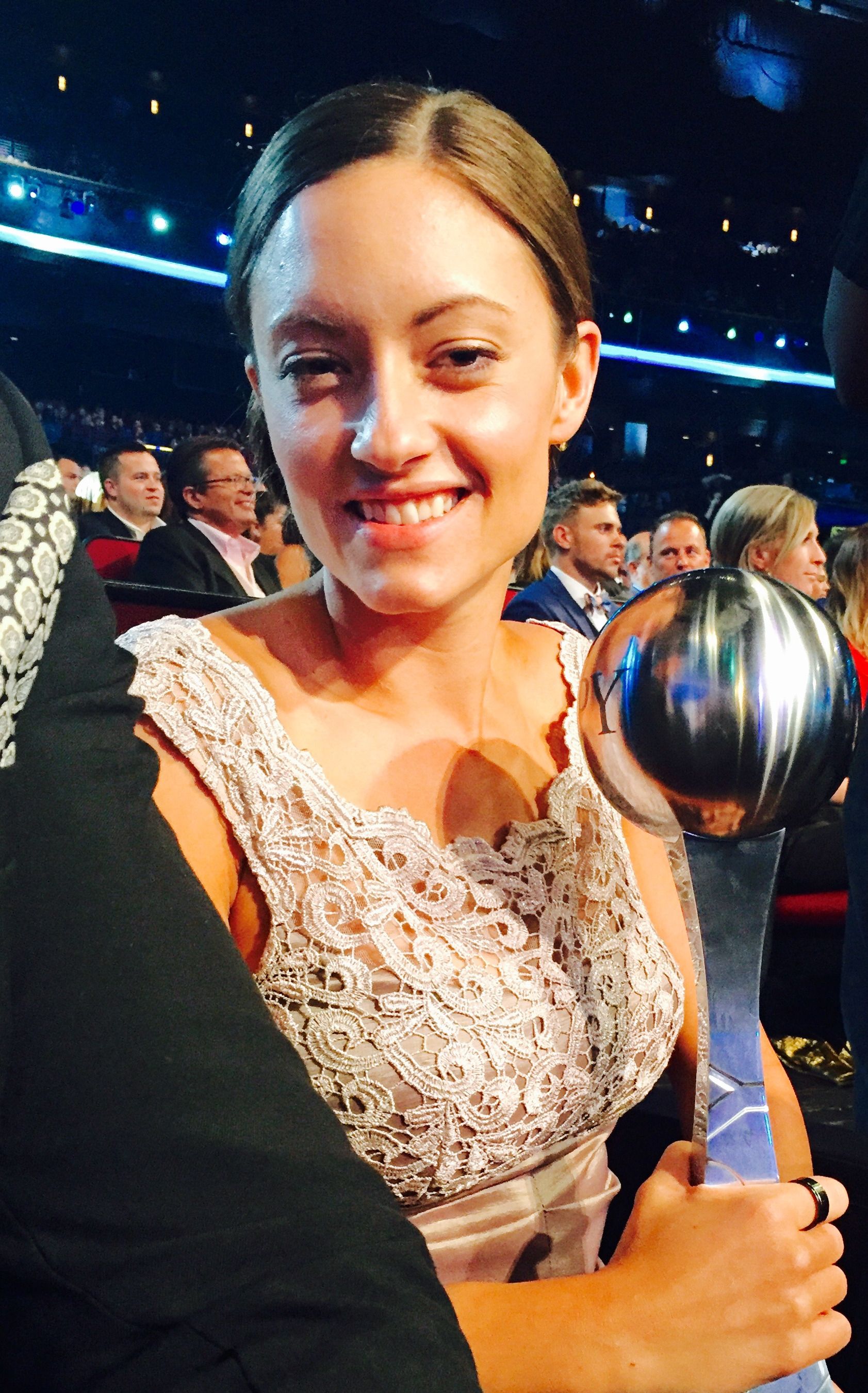
Sergeant Elizabeth Marks with her Pat Tillman Award trophy

Arthur Ashe Courage Award

- Zaevion Dobson

Jimmy V Perseverance Award

- Craig Sager

Pat Tillman Award for Service

- Sgt. Elizabeth Marks

Best Moment

- Cleveland Cavaliers win the NBA Finals

Icon Award

- Abby Wambach
- Kobe Bryant
- Peyton Manning

== Presenters ==
- Chris Berman
- Joe Biden
- Ciara
- Stephen Curry
- Skylar Diggins
- Lisa Leslie
- David Oyelowo
- Danica Patrick
- Miles Teller
- Justin Timberlake
- Usher
- Lindsey Vonn
- Dwyane Wade
- J. J. Watt
- Russell Wilson

== Tribute ==
The ESPYs held a tribute to boxing legend Muhammad Ali, presented by Kareem Abdul-Jabbar and Chance the Rapper.

== In Memoriam ==
Andra Day performed during the tribute with "Rearview" honoring the fallen sports stars:

- Pat Summitt
- Buddy Ryan
- Moses Malone
- Dave Mirra
- Meadowlark Lemon
- Dwayne Washington
- Darryl Dawkins
- Ed Snider
- Mel Daniels
- Joe Garagiola
- John "Hot Rod" Williams
- Justin Wilson
- Jimmy Roberts
- Lindy Infante
- Will Smith
- Doug Atkins
- Johan Cruyff
- Ted Marchibroda
- Bud Collins
- Kimbo Slice
- Frank Gifford
- Yogi Berra
- Monte Irvin
- Louise Suggs
- Jules Bianchi
- Al Arbour
- Jim Simpson
- Clyde Lovellette
- Dave Henderson
- Stephen Keshi
- Dolph Schayes
- Gordie Howe
- Muhammad Ali
