= Skip Storch =

American swimmer (born c. 1957)

Personal information
- Born: David Storch; 1957 (age 68–69)

Sport
- Sport: Swimming

David "Skip" Storch (born c. 1957) is an American swimmer.

On August 29, 2007, 50-year-old Storch swam a record-breaking 85.5 miles unassisted continuous triple lap swim around Manhattan Island, completing the swim in 32 hours and 52 minutes, breaking two recognized records and qualifying him for an ESPN ESPY Award. Storch did not stop swimming but did stop river boat traffic. He was nominated for an ESPN ESPY award, "Best Outdoor Sportsman", for this achievement in 2008. Storch lives and works in Nanuet, New York, at his own Tackle and Fly shop called SHU-Fly.

He is the assistant swimming coach at Ramapo College in Mahwah, New Jersey, and trains at LifePlex pool in Monsey, New York. Skip has done numerous other marathon swims in Open Water Swimming. Skip is also known for his environmental work creating awareness of pollution in the Hudson River and other waterways.

In 2017, Storch was charged with predatory sexual assault against a child. During their investigation, authorities said they learned Storch had committed sexual acts with a child under 13. In 2018 Storch pleaded guilty and was sentenced to 7 years in prison, with 15 years of probation, and will be on the New York State Sex Offender Registry.

== Awards ==
- ESPN ESPY Nomination "Best Outdoor Sportsman"
- Skip Storch Day (Rockland County) May 5, 2009
- International Swimming Hall of Fame 2009, as a Marathon inductee
