= Tina Bosworth =

American log-roller

Tina Bosworth is an American log-roller, and holds the world record for winning the most women's log rolling championships.

== Career ==
Bosworth is recognized by Guinness World Records for being the only ten-time women's log-rolling world champion. She is the only person who has ever won five consecutive gold medals in the ESPN Great Outdoor Games.

Bosworth won the Best Outdoor Sportsman ESPY Award in 2004, and is the only woman to ever do so.

== Personal life ==
Bosworth is the sister of J. R. Salzman, a veteran and another top log-roller.
