= 2019 ESPY Awards =

Athletic awards show

- Date: July 10, 2019
- Location: Microsoft Theater, Los Angeles
- Country: United States
- Hosted by: Tracy Morgan

Television/radio coverage
- Network: ABC
- Runtime: 180 minutes
- Viewership: 3.871 million

The 2019 ESPY Awards were presented at the 27th annual ESPY Awards show, held on July 10, 2019, at 5 pm Pacific at the Microsoft Theater in Los Angeles and broadcast on television nationwide in the United States on ABC at 8 pm Eastern/7 pm Central. Tracy Morgan served as the host.

== Winners and nominees ==
Best Male Athlete: Giannis Antetokounmpo – Milwaukee Bucks, NBA; Mookie Betts – Boston Red Sox, MLB; Brooks Koepka – Golf; Patrick Mahomes – Kansas City Chiefs, NFL	Best Female Athlete: Alex Morgan - Orlando Pride, United States women's national soccer team; Simone Biles – Gymnast; Mikaela Shiffrin – Skiing; Breanna Stewart – Seattle Storm, WNBA; Dynamo Kursk, EuroLeague Women; United States women's national basketball team
Best Breakthrough Athlete: Saquon Barkley – New York Giants, NFL; Naomi Osaka – Tennis; Christian Yelich – Milwaukee Brewers, MLB; Trae Young – Atlanta Hawks, NBA	Best Team: U.S. Women's Soccer Team – FIFA; Boston Red Sox – MLB; New England Patriots – NFL; Clemson Tigers – NCAA Division I FBS football; Toronto Raptors – NBA; Baylor Lady Bears – NCAA women's basketball; Virginia Cavaliers – NCAA men's basketball
Best Game: Los Angeles Rams defeat Kansas City Chiefs 54–51 on Monday Night Football; Texas A&M defeats LSU 74–72 in seven overtimes in highest scoring NCAA FBS game in history; Notre Dame defeats UConn 81–76 in the 2019 NCAA Women's Final Four	Best Play (Elimination Format): Katelyn Ohashi (UCLA) scores a Perfect 10 in gymnastics floor exercise; Miracle in Miami (advanced to Finals); Kawhi Leonard's game-winning buzzer-beater that advanced the Toronto Raptors to the Eastern Conference finals (advanced to Finals); Derrick Henry runs for an NFL record tying 99-yard TD (advanced to Finals); Wayne Rooney single-handedly won a game for D.C. United; Andrew Benintendi calls game; Damian Lillard's buzzer-beater that sent the Portland Trail Blazers in the Western Conference playoffs and eliminated the Oklahoma City Thunder (advanced to Round 2); Midlothian, Virginia QB Brendon Clark throws a 48-yard TD pass to Kevin Henderson that popped behind his opponent's head; Texas Tech wide receiver T. J. Vasher does his best Odell Beckham Jr. imitation (advanced to Round 2); Kinsley Washington singled home Jacqui Prober to win UCLA's 12th Women's College World Series softball title; Julie Ertz scores a goal against Brazil early in the second half of their Tournament of Nations match (advanced to Round 2); Texas A&M's Infinite Tucker goes for the gold at the SEC Outdoor Track & Field Championships; Arike Ogunbowale behind-the-back pass (advanced to Round 2); Kihei Clark and Mamadi Diakite save Virginia at the buzzer in the Elite Eight; Wilmington Charter's Taylor Gillis with a sensational catch; North Shore Senior High School wins Texas state title with Hail Mary pass
Best College Athlete: Zion Williamson – Duke Blue Devils; Rachel Garcia – UCLA Bruins; Sabrina Ionescu – Oregon Ducks; Kyler Murray – Oklahoma Sooners	Best Record-Breaking Performance: Drew Brees surpassing Peyton Manning's 71,940 NFL passing yards on Monday Night Football; he also surpassed Brett Favre's completion record; Matthew Boling breaks the national high school record for the boys' 100 meter dash.; Sabrina Ionescu scoring her 13th triple double in her NCAA career, making her the record holder for most triple doubles, male or female, in NCAA history; Klay Thompson scoring 14 3-point field goals in an NBA game, breaking Stephen Curry's previous record
Best NFL Player: Patrick Mahomes – Kansas City Chiefs; Drew Brees – New Orleans Saints; Aaron Donald – Los Angeles Rams; Todd Gurley – Los Angeles Rams	Best MLB Player: Christian Yelich – Milwaukee Brewers; Mookie Betts – Boston Red Sox; Jacob DeGrom – New York Mets; Blake Snell – Tampa Bay Rays
Best NBA Player: Giannis Antetokounmpo – Milwaukee Bucks; Kevin Durant – Golden State Warriors; Paul George – Oklahoma City Thunder; James Harden – Houston Rockets	Best NHL Player: Alexander Ovechkin – Washington Capitals; Nikita Kucherov – Tampa Bay Lightning; Connor McDavid – Edmonton Oilers; Nathan MacKinnon – Colorado Avalanche
Best MLS Player: Zlatan Ibrahimović – LA Galaxy; Josef Martínez – Atlanta United; Aaron Long – New York Red Bulls; Wayne Rooney – D.C. United	Best NWSL Player: Sam Kerr – Chicago Red Stars; Abby Erceg – North Carolina Courage; Adrianna Franch – Portland Thorns; Lindsey Horan – Portland Thorns
Best International Men's Soccer Player: Lionel Messi – FC Barcelona/Argentina; Kylian Mbappé – Paris Saint-Germain F.C./France; Cristiano Ronaldo – Juventus FC/Portugal; Virgil Van Dijk – Liverpool F.C./Netherlands	Best International Women's Soccer Player: Sam Kerr – Chicago Red Stars/Perth Glory/Australia; Pernille Harder – VfL Wolfsburg/Denmark; Ada Hegerberg – Olympique Lyonnais/Norway; Lucy Bronze – Olympique Lyonnais/England
Best WNBA Player: Breanna Stewart – Seattle Storm; Elena Delle Donne – Washington Mystics; Candace Parker – Los Angeles Sparks; Diana Taurasi – Phoenix Mercury	Best Driver: Kyle Busch – NASCAR; Scott Dixon – IndyCar; Lewis Hamilton – Formula One; Steve Torrence – NHRA
Best Male Golfer: Brooks Koepka; Francesco Molinari; Justin Rose; Tiger Woods	Best Female Golfer: Brooke Henderson; Ariya Jutanugarn; Jin-Young Ko; Sung Hyun Park
Best Boxer: Canelo Álvarez; Terence Crawford; Vasily Lomachenko; Oleksandr Usyk	Best MMA Fighter: Daniel Cormier; Israel Adesanya; Henry Cejudo; Amanda Nunes
Best Jockey: Mike E. Smith; Florent Geroux; Irad Ortiz Jr.; José Ortiz	Best Upset: Andy Ruiz Jr. defeats Anthony Joshua in a heavyweight title fight; Columbus Blue Jackets sweep the top-seeded Tampa Bay Lightning in the first round of the 2019 Stanley Cup playoffs; Old Domininon defeats #13 Virginia Tech; Naomi Osaka beats Serena Williams at the 2018 US Open
Best Male Action Sports Athlete: Nyjah Huston – Skateboarding; Scotty James – Snowboarding; Gabriel Medina – Surfing; Tom Pagès – Freestyle Motocross	Best Female Action Sports Athlete: Chloe Kim – Snowboarding; Stephanie Gilmore – Surfing; Zoi Sadowski-Synnott – Snowboarding; Kelly Sildaru – Skiing
Best Male Athlete with a Disability: Mark Barr – triathlon; Declan Farmer – sledge hockey; Daniel Romanchuk – marathon racing; Oz Sanchez – cycling	Best Female Athlete with a Disability: Allysa Seely – triathlon; Oksana Masters – Nordic skiing; Tatyana McFadden – marathon racing; Shawn Morelli – cycling
Best Viral Moment: Katelyn Ohashi scores a perfect 10 in gymnastics; Texas A&M athlete Infinite Tucker lunges for the gold at the SEC Championships; Sister Mary Jo's first pitch at a Chicago White Sox game is a curveball	Best WWE Moment: Roman Reigns returns to action following a recurrence of leukemia; Becky Lynch wins Raw and SmackDown Women's titles at the main event of WrestleMania 35; Kofi Kingston wins the WWE Championship after 11 years at WrestleMania 35; Ronda Rousey wins the Raw Women's title at Summerslam
Best Bowler: Norm Duke; Jason Belmonte; Jakob Butturff; Anthony Simonsen	Best Esports Moment (Elimination format): OLarry returns to NBA 2K League following Jacksonville Landing shooting; SonicFox winning Evo after switching sides; Team Liquid upsets defending world champ Invictus Gaming at MSI; Cloud9 wins CS:GO Boston Major; Astralis winning Katowice; Invictus Gaming League of Legends World Championship; Spitfire win inaugural Overwatch League championship; Serral winning StarCraft at BlizzCon; Shanghai Dragons end 42-game losing streak; Team OG wins The International and $11 million from qualifiers; Chiquita Evans becoming the first woman in the NBA 2K League; Leffen finally winning EVO in what could be Super Smash Bros: Melee's last year at the event; Ninja Fortnite win with Marshmello at E3 ProAM; Chritobin Madden Challenge walk off; G2 Esports wins Rainbow Six world championship; Mongausse winning Summer Skirmish from out of nowhere
Best Male Tennis Player: Roger Federer; Novak Djokovic; Rafael Nadal; Stefanos Tsitsipas	Best Female Tennis Player: Serena Williams; Naomi Osaka; Simona Halep; Petra Kvitová

== Honorary awards ==
Arthur Ashe Award for Courage

- Bill Russell

Muhammad Ali Sports Humanitarian Award

- Chris Long

Best Coach

- Jim Calhoun

Best Comeback

- St. Louis Blues come from being at the bottom of the NHL standings to win the Stanley Cup

Best Moment

- Rob Gronkowski, Lindsey Vonn and Dwyane Wade for their careers

Capital One Cup

- Men: Virginia Cavaliers
- Women: Stanford Cardinal

Jimmy V Award

- Rob Mendez

Pat Tillman Award for Service

- Kirstie Ennis

== In Memoriam ==
The 2019 ESPY Awards was the first time that there was no "In Memoriam" segment aired live. The segment was replaced by a segment honoring players' assistance within their communities with a performance of "In Times Like These" by Grammy award-winning Gospel singer Tori Kelly, taking place during the award segment for the Arthur Ashe Courage Award, which was awarded to NBA legend and Civil Rights activist Bill Russell.
