= ESPY Awards =

American sports awards

- Current: 2026 ESPY Awards
- Awarded for: Excellence in sports performance and achievements
- Country: United States
- First award: 1993
- Website: www.espn.com/espys/

Television/radio coverage
- Networks
- ESPN (1993–2014; 2020); ABC (2015–2019; 2021–present) (Note: ABC aired a rebroadcast of ESPN's coverage in 2020.)

The ESPY Awards (short for Excellence in Sports Performance Yearly Awards, and often referred to as the ESPYs) is an annual American awards show produced by ESPN since 1993, recognizing individual and team athletic achievement and other sports-related performance during the calendar year preceding a given annual ceremony. From 2015 to 2019, and since 2021, the ceremony has aired live on sister broadcast television network ABC, while ESPN continues to air simulcasts of the awards and reruns. Because of the ceremony's rescheduling prior to the 2002 event, awards presented in 2002 were for achievement and performances during the seventeen previous months. As the similarly styled Grammy (for music), Emmy (for television), Academy Awards (for film), and Tony Awards (for theater), the ESPYs are hosted by a contemporary celebrity; the style is lighter, more relaxed and self-referential than several other awards shows, with comedic sketches usually included.

== Charitable role ==
A portion of the proceeds from sales of tickets to the event goes to the V Foundation, a charity established by collegiate basketball coach and television commentator Jim Valvano to promote cancer research. Valvano announced the creation of the charitable foundation during his acceptance of the Arthur Ashe Courage Award during the inaugural ESPY telecast on March 3, 1993, 55 days before Valvano's death from metastatic adenocarcinoma.

== Design ==
The ESPY Award statuette was designed and created by sculptor Lawrence Nowlan. The statuette consists of a silver sphere, with the word "ESPY" engraved on it, mounted on a silver pedestal.

== Ceremonies ==
=== Timing ===
Between 1993 and 2001, the ceremony was held each year in either February or March and was broadcast recorded on ESPN.

Between 2002 and 2019, from 2022 to 2023, and since 2025, the ceremony has been held on the second or third Wednesday of July, one day after the Major League Baseball (MLB) All-Star Game, as it marks the only day of the year on which none of the major North American professional leagues nor college sports programs have games scheduled. The National Basketball Association, National Football League, and National Hockey League are not in-season, although the NBA's post-draft training camp NBA Summer League occurs and NFL teams prepare for training camp, colleges are on summer vacation, and MLB does not contest games on the day following its all-star game. Therefore, major sports figures except for those in the WNBA, which is in-season; cycling, which has the Tour de France; minor league baseball; and golf, where The Open Championship usually starts that evening, are available to attend. The show historically aired on the subsequent Sunday four days later, although the results were reported publicly by ESPN.com. In 2024, the ceremony was held on the second Thursday of July.

In 2010, the ceremony was aired live by ESPN for the first time since 2003. In 2015, the ESPY Awards moved to network television, airing on ESPN's corporate sister network ABC.

=== Location ===
The first seven editions of the ESPYs were held in New York City, in 1993 and 1994 at Madison Square Garden and from 1995 through 1999, at Radio City Music Hall. The awards relocated to Las Vegas, Nevada, for two years beginning in 2000, and in 2002, moved to the Kodak Theater (now the Dolby Theatre) in Hollywood, California. In 2006, it was announced that the awards would move in 2008 to the Nokia Theatre (now the Peacock Theater), to be situated as the West Coast headquarters of ESPN at L.A. Live, adjacent to the Crypto.com Arena in Los Angeles. The awards returned to Dolby Theatre in 2022.

In January 2026, it was reported that the ESPYs would return to New York City in order to coincide with Fanatics Fest, as part of a partnership with Michael Ratner's newly launched Fanatics Studios to produce the ceremony.

=== Hosts ===
The ceremonies have been hosted by comedians, television and film actors, and athletes. American actor Samuel L. Jackson has hosted the ceremony four times (in 1999, 2001, 2002, and 2009). Comedian Dennis Miller, actor and singer Jamie Foxx, and talk show host and comedian Seth Meyers have hosted the show twice.

=== Year-by-year ===
Date	Edition	Venue	Host(s)
July 15, 2026	34th	David H. Koch Theater, New York	Marcello Hernández
July 16, 2025	33rd	Dolby Theatre, Los Angeles	Shane Gillis
July 11, 2024	32nd	Dolby Theatre, Los Angeles	Serena Williams
July 12, 2023	31st	Dolby Theatre, Los Angeles	—N/a
July 20, 2022	30th	Dolby Theatre, Los Angeles	Stephen Curry
July 10, 2021	29th	The Rooftop at Pier 17, New York	Anthony Mackie
June 21, 2020	28th	Virtual show	Russell Wilson, Megan Rapinoe and Sue Bird
July 10, 2019	27th	Nokia Theatre / Microsoft Theater, Los Angeles	Tracy Morgan
July 18, 2018	26th	Nokia Theatre / Microsoft Theater, Los Angeles	Danica Patrick
July 12, 2017	25th	Nokia Theatre / Microsoft Theater, Los Angeles	Peyton Manning
July 13, 2016	24th	Nokia Theatre / Microsoft Theater, Los Angeles	John Cena
July 15, 2015	23rd	Nokia Theatre / Microsoft Theater, Los Angeles	Joel McHale
July 16, 2014	22nd	Nokia Theatre / Microsoft Theater, Los Angeles	Drake
July 17, 2013	21st	Nokia Theatre / Microsoft Theater, Los Angeles	Jon Hamm
July 11, 2012	20th	Nokia Theatre / Microsoft Theater, Los Angeles	Rob Riggle
July 13, 2011	19th	Nokia Theatre / Microsoft Theater, Los Angeles	Seth Meyers
July 14, 2010	18th	Nokia Theatre / Microsoft Theater, Los Angeles	Seth Meyers
July 19, 2009	17th	Nokia Theatre / Microsoft Theater, Los Angeles	Samuel L. Jackson
July 20, 2008	16th	Nokia Theatre / Microsoft Theater, Los Angeles	Justin Timberlake
July 15, 2007	15th	Kodak Theater, Los Angeles	LeBron James and Jimmy Kimmel
July 16, 2006	14th	Kodak Theater, Los Angeles	Lance Armstrong
July 17, 2005	13th	Kodak Theater, Los Angeles	Matthew Perry
July 18, 2004	12th	Kodak Theater, Los Angeles	Jamie Foxx
July 16, 2003	11th	Kodak Theater, Los Angeles	Jamie Foxx
July 10, 2002	10th	Kodak Theater, Los Angeles	Samuel L. Jackson
February 12, 2001	9th	MGM Grand, Las Vegas	Samuel L. Jackson
February 14, 2000	8th	MGM Grand, Las Vegas	Jimmy Smits
February 15, 1999	7th	Radio City Music Hall, New York	Samuel L. Jackson
February 9, 1998	6th	Radio City Music Hall, New York	Norm Macdonald
February 10, 1997	5th	Radio City Music Hall, New York	Jeff Foxworthy
February 12, 1996	4th	Radio City Music Hall, New York	Tony Danza
February 13, 1995	3rd	Radio City Music Hall, New York	John Goodman
February 14, 1994	2nd	Madison Square Garden, New York	Dennis Miller
March 4, 1993	1st	Madison Square Garden, New York	Dennis Miller

== Awards ==
American professional golfer Tiger Woods is the most-awarded individual at the ESPYs, having received 21 awards.

=== Extant ===
==== Cross-cutter categories ====
Cross-cutter awards are those for which the eligibility is not confined to those athletes participating in, or those events occurring in, any single or specific sport.

- Arthur Ashe Courage Award, presented to the sports-related person or team, irrespective of gender or sport contested, adjudged to have made the most significant or compelling humanitarian contribution in transcendence of sports in a given year (presented since 1993)
- Best Female Athlete ESPY Award, presented to the female athlete, irrespective of nationality or sport contested, adjudged to be the most outstanding over a given year (1993)
- Best Male Athlete ESPY Award, presented to the male athlete, irrespective of nationality or sport contested, adjudged to be the most outstanding in a given year (1993)
- Best International Athlete ESPY Award, presented since 2006 to the professional athlete born outside the United States adjudged to be the best in a given year
- Best Breakthrough Athlete ESPY Award, presented to the athlete, irrespective of gender or sport contested, adjudged to have made the best or most significant breakthrough in their sport in a given year (1993)
- Best Championship Performance ESPY Award, presented to the athlete, irrespective of gender, nationality, or sport contested, adjudged to have made the best or most significant performance in a championship match, series, or tournament in their sport
- Best Coach/Manager ESPY Award, presented to the coach or manager, irrespective of nationality or sport contested, adjudged to be the most outstanding in a given year (1993)
- Best College Athlete, Men's Sports, presented to the male athlete, irrespective of sport played, adjudged to be the best in the National Collegiate Athletic Association, in a given year (2002)
- Best College Athlete, Women's Sports, presented to the female athlete, irrespective of sport played, adjudged to be the best in the National Collegiate Athletic Association in a given year (2002)
- Best Comeback Athlete ESPY Award, presented to the athlete, irrespective of gender or sport contested, adjudged to have most notably returned to their sport after an illness, injury, hardship, or retirement (1993)
- Best Female Athlete with a Disability ESPY Award, presented to the female athlete with a disability, irrespective of nationality or sport contested, adjudged to be the best in a given year (2005)
- Best Male Athlete with a Disability ESPY Award, presented to the male athlete with a disability, irrespective of nationality or sport contested, adjudged to be the best in a given year (2005)
- Best Game ESPY Award, presented to the single game in a North American professional or collegiate league, irrespective of sport, adjudged to be the best in a given year (2002)
- Best Upset ESPY Award, presented to the athlete or team, irrespective of gender or sport contested, adjudged to have completed the best, most impressive, or most significant upset in a given year (2004)
- Best Moment ESPY Award, presented to the moment or series of moments occurring in a sporting event or season, irrespective of sport contested or gender of participating athlete, adjudged to the most remarkable, compelling, or entertaining in a given year (2002)
- Best Play ESPY Award, presented to the single play or performance, irrespective of sport contested or gender of participating athlete, adjudged to be the most remarkable, significant, or impressive in a given year (2002)
- Best Record-Breaking Performance ESPY Award, presented to the record-breaking single-play, game or season performance, irrespective of sport contested or gender of participating athlete, adjudged to be the most remarkable, significant, or impressive in a given year (2001)
- Jimmy V ESPY Award for Perseverance (2007)
- Muhammad Ali Sports Humanitarian Award, presented to "an athlete whose continuous, demonstrated leadership has created a measured positive impact on their community through sports" (2015)
- Best Team ESPY Award, presented to the collegiate, professional, or national team, irrespective of sport contested, adjudged to be the most outstanding in a given year (1993)

==== Individual categories ====
Individual awards are those for which eligibility is limited to those partaking of a single individual or team sport or specific sport category.

- Best Female Action Sports Athlete ESPY Award, presented to the female extreme sport athlete, irrespective of nationality or sport contested, adjudged to be the best in a given year (presented since 2004)
- Best Male Action Sports Athlete ESPY Award, presented to the male extreme sport athlete, irrespective of nationality or sport contested, adjudged to be the best in a given year (2004)
- Best Angler ESPY Award, presented to the angler, irrespective of gender, adjudged to be the best in a given year (2006)
- Best Bowler ESPY Award, presented to the ten-pin bowler, irrespective of gender, adjudged to be the best playing in the United States in a given year (1995)
- Best Boxer ESPY Award, presented to the boxer, irrespective of nationality or weight class, adjudged to be the best in a given year (1993–2006, 2019–present)
- Best Driver ESPY Award, presented to the motorsports driver, irrespective of nationality, gender, or series or sort contested adjudged to be best in a given year (1993)
- Best Female Golfer ESPY Award, presented to the female professional golfer, irrespective of nationality, adjudged to be the best in a given year (1993–2004, 2009–present)
- Best Male Golfer ESPY Award, presented to the male professional golfer, irrespective of nationality, adjudged to be the best in a given year (1993–2004, 2009–present)
- Best Jockey ESPY Award, presented to the thoroughbred horse racing jockey, irrespective of nationality or gender, adjudged to be the best riding in the United States in a given year (1994)
- Best MLS Player ESPY Award, presented to the player adjudged to be the best in Major League Soccer in a given year (2006)
- Best Major League Baseball Player ESPY Award, presented to the player adjudged to be the best in Major League Baseball in a given year (1993)
- Best MMA Fighter ESPY Award, presented to the mixed martial arts fighter, irrespective of nationality or weight class, adjudged to be the best in a given year (2019)
- Best NBA Player ESPY Award, presented to the player adjudged to be the best in the National Basketball Association in a given year (1993)
- Best NFL Player ESPY Award, presented to the player adjudged to be the best in the National Football League in a given year (1993)
- Best NHL Player ESPY Award, presented to the player adjudged to be the best in the National Hockey League in a given year (1993–present; not awarded in 2005 due to cancellation of previous season)
- Best NWSL Player ESPY Award, presented to the player adjudged to be the best in the National Women's Soccer League in a given year (2018)
- Best Female Tennis Player ESPY Award, presented to the female professional tennis player, irrespective of nationality, adjudged to be the best in a given year (1993)
- Best Male Tennis Player ESPY Award, presented to the male professional tennis player, irrespective of nationality, adjudged to be the best in a given year (1993)
- Best Track and Field Athlete ESPY Award, presented to the track and field athlete, irrespective of nationality or gender, adjudged to be the best in a given year (2007; not awarded in 2009)
- Best WNBA Player ESPY Award, presented to the player adjudged to be the best in the Women's National Basketball Association in a given year (1998)
- Best WWE Moment ESPY Award, presented to the WWE Superstar who had the most memorable moment during WWE's calendar year (2019)

==== Sponsored categories ====
Sponsored awards are those otherwise constituted as cross-cutter awards the titles and eligibility criteria of which reflect corporate sponsorship.

- GMC Professional Grade Play ESPY Award, presented to the single play in a professional or collegiate North American sport adjudged to be the most impressive, remarkable, or notable in a given year, and to the athlete involved in (presented since 2006)

=== Discontinued, irregular, or superseded ===
==== Cross-cutter categories ====
Cross-cutter awards were those the eligibility for which is not confined to those athletes participating in, or those events occurring in, any single or specific sport.

- Under Armour Undeniable Performance ESPY Award, presented to the single performance in a game or series in a professional or collegiate North American sports league to be the most impressive or significant in a given year, and to the athletes involved with (only awarded in 2006)
- Alternative Athlete of the Year (presented in 2000 to Tony Hawk)
- Best U.S. Olympic Athlete (presented in 2002 to Sarah Hughes)
- Female USA Olympic Athlete (presented in 2001 to Marion Jones, 2005 to Team USA Softball, and 2009 to Shawn Johnson)
- Male USA Olympic Athlete (presented in 2001 to Rulon Gardner and in 2005 and 2009 to Michael Phelps)
- Come-from-behind Performance (presented in 2001 to Tiger Woods)
- Game of the Year ESPY Award (presented between 1996 and 1998, not to be confused with the Best Game ESPY Award)
- Dramatic Individual Performance of the Year ESPY Award (presented between 1997 and 1999)
- Humanitarian of the Year (presented in 1999 to Sammy Sosa)
- Lifetime Achievement Award (presented in 2001 to Jack Nicklaus)
- Memorable Performance of the Year ESPY Award (presented between 2000 and 2001)
- Most Spectacular Play (presented in 2001 to Antonio Freeman)
- Outstanding Performance by an Athlete in Entertainment (presented between 1994 and 1996, to Charles Barkley, John Kruk, George Seifert)
- Outstanding Performance by a Sports Personality in a Commercial (presented in 1993 to Larry Johnson)
- Outstanding Performance by a Sports Personality in an Attempt to Break into Show Business (presented in 1993 to Shaquille O'Neal)
- Outstanding Performance Under Pressure ESPY Award (presented between 1993 and 1999)
- Outrageous Play of the Year ESPY Award (presented between 1993 and 1998)
- Showstopper of the Year ESPY Award (presented between 1993 and 1999)
- NBA Play of the Year ESPY Award (presented between 1993 and 1998)

==== Individual categories ====
Individual awards were those for which eligibility is limited to those partaking of a single individual or team sport or specific sport category.

- Best Action Sports Athlete ESPY Award, presented to the extreme sport athlete, irrespective of gender, nationality, or discipline contested, adjudged to be the best in a given year (presented between 2002 and 2003)
- Best Female College Basketball Player ESPY Award, presented to the female basketball player in the National Collegiate Athletic Association adjudged to be the best in a given year (1993–2001)
- Best Male College Basketball Player ESPY Award, presented to the male basketball player in the National Collegiate Athletic Association adjudged to be the best in a given year (1993–2001)
- Best College Football Player ESPY Award, presented to the American football player in the National Collegiate Athletic Association adjudged to be the best in a given year (1993–2001)
- Best Athlete with a Disability ESPY Award, presented to the athlete with a disability, irrespective of gender, nationality, or sport contested, adjudged to be the best in a given year (2002–2004)
- Best Fighter ESPY Award, presented to the professional boxer, mixed martial arts fighter, international or collegiate wrestler irrespective of nationality or weight class, adjudged to be the best in a given year (2007–2018)
- Best Golfer ESPY Award, presented to the professional golfer, irrespective of nationality or gender, adjudged to be best in a given year (2005–2008)
- Best Female Soccer Player ESPY Award, presented to the female soccer (association football) player, irrespective of nationality, adjudged to be the best in a given year (2002–2004)
- Best Male Soccer Player ESPY Award, presented to the male soccer (association football) player, irrespective of nationality, adjudged to be the best in a given year (2002–2004)
- Best Soccer Player ESPY Award, presented to the soccer player, irrespective of gender or nationality, adjudged to be the best in a given year (2000)
- Best Outdoor Sportsman ESPY Award, presented to the athlete, irrespective of gender or nationality, adjudged to be the best of those contesting outdoor recreational or nature-based individual sports in the United States and Canada in a given year (2002–2005)
- Best Female Track Athlete ESPY Award, presented to the female track and field athlete, irrespective of nationality, adjudged to be the best in a given year (1993–2006; not awarded in 2005)
- Best Male Track Athlete ESPY Award, presented to the male track and field athlete, irrespective of nationality, adjudged to be the best in a given year (1993–2006; not awarded in 2005)

==== Sponsored categories ====
Sponsored awards were those otherwise constituted as cross-cutter awards the titles and eligibility criteria in which reflect corporate sponsorship.

== See also ==
- Athlete of the Year
- Laureus World Sports Awards
