= 2018 ESPY Awards =

Athletic awards show

- Date: July 18, 2018
- Location: Microsoft Theater, Los Angeles
- Country: United States
- Hosted by: Danica Patrick

Television/radio coverage
- Network: ABC
- Runtime: 180 minutes

The 2018 ESPY Awards were presented at the 26th annual ESPY Awards show, held on July 18, 2018 at 5 PM Pacific at the Microsoft Theater in Los Angeles and on television nationwide in the United States on ABC at 8 PM Eastern/7 PM Central. On May 22, 2018, it was announced that Danica Patrick would host the event, which made her the first woman to have hosted the show.

== Winners and nominees ==
These were the nominees for each of the competitive awards. Fans were able to vote online at a dedicated ESPN site.

Best Male Athlete: Alexander Ovechkin – Washington Capitals, NHL; Jose Altuve – Houston Astros, MLB; Tom Brady – New England Patriots, NFL; James Harden – Houston Rockets, NBA	Best Female Athlete: Chloe Kim – Snowboarding; Julie Ertz – Chicago Red Stars, NWSL and USWNT; Sylvia Fowles – Minnesota Lynx, WNBA
Best Game: USA Women's Ice Hockey vs. Canada Women's Ice Hockey – 2018 Winter Olympics; Georgia Bulldogs vs. Oklahoma Sooners – 2018 Rose Bowl; Houston Astros vs. Los Angeles Dodgers – 2017 World Series, Game 5	Best Championship Performance: Nick Foles, Philadelphia Eagles – Super Bowl LII; Donte DiVincenzo, Villanova Wildcats – 2018 NCAA Division I Basketball National Championship; Kevin Durant, Golden State Warriors – 2018 NBA Finals; George Springer, 2017 Houston Astros season – 2017 World Series
Best Breakthrough Athlete: Donovan Mitchell – Utah Jazz, NBA; Alvin Kamara – New Orleans Saints, NFL; Ben Simmons – Philadelphia 76ers, NBA; Sloane Stephens – Women's Tennis, WTA	Best Record-Breaking Performance: Roger Federer – 8th Wimbledon championship; Tom Brady – 187 NFL regular-season wins; Aaron Judge – 52 home runs by an MLB rookie; Diana Taurasi – First WNBA player to make 1,000 3-pointers
Best Team: Houston Astros – MLB; Golden State Warriors – NBA; Notre Dame Fighting Irish - NCAA women's basketball; Philadelphia Eagles – NFL; Villanova Wildcats – NCAA men's basketball; Washington Capitals – NHL; USA Women's Ice Hockey – Ice hockey	Best Play: Arike Ogunbowale hits 2nd buzzer-beater to win NCAA women's national title; Minneapolis Miracle: Stefon Diggs makes last-second TD Catch to send Vikings to NFC championship; Philly Special: Eagles fool Patriots with fourth-down touchdown pass to Foles; Alabama Tua Tagovailoa's 41-yard touchdown pass to DeVonta Smith in overtime to win national title; Florida State's Jessie Warren makes diving double play in Women's College World Series; LeBron James nails buzzer-beater 3-pointer to beat the Pacers; Evanston Township High school's Blake Peters hits 80-foot buzzer-beater; Gareth Bale's bicycle kick goal in Champions League Final; Cristiano Ronaldo's bicycle kick goal against Juventus; Julian McGarvey makes last-second steal to secure Ardsley High School's Section 1 title; LeBron floats a glass-kissing buzzer-beater to beat Raptors; Team USA's Jocelyne Lamoureux-Davidson scores the shootout winner to win the gold medal in women's hockey; Giannis Antetokounmpo's leapfrog dunk on Tim Hardaway Jr.; Acrobatic volleyball play from Autumn Finney out of Decatur High School; Golden Knights' William Karlsson through-the-legs goal; Jordan Poole hits buzzer-beater to send Michigan to the Sweet 16
Best Moment: Minnesota Vikings defeat the New Orleans Saints in a NFC Divisional Playoff game; Notre Dame defeats Mississippi State to win NCAA women's basketball title; Vegas Golden Knights defeat Winnipeg Jets to advance to the Stanley Cup Finals; #16 University of Maryland, Baltimore County upsets # 1 Virginia in NCAA basketball tournament	Best Olympic Moment: Shaun White comes from behind to win 3rd Olympic gold medal in men's halfpipe; Jessie Diggins & Kikkan Randall win a photo-finish for USA's first gold medal in cross-country skiing; U.S. Men's Curling team wins gold medal; U.S. Women's Ice Hockey team defeats Canada for gold medal
Best NFL Player: Tom Brady – New England Patriots; Antonio Brown – Pittsburgh Steelers; Aaron Donald – Los Angeles Rams; Todd Gurley – Los Angeles Rams	Best MLB Player: Mike Trout – Los Angeles Angels; Jose Altuve – Houston Astros; Aaron Judge – New York Yankees; Max Scherzer – Washington Nationals
Best NHL Player: Alexander Ovechkin – Washington Capitals; Sidney Crosby – Pittsburgh Penguins; Marc-André Fleury – Vegas Golden Knights; Connor McDavid – Edmonton Oilers	Best NBA Player: LeBron James – Cleveland Cavaliers; Giannis Antetokounmpo – Milwaukee Bucks; Anthony Davis – New Orleans Pelicans; James Harden – Houston Rockets
Best WNBA Player: Maya Moore – Minnesota Lynx; Skylar Diggins-Smith – Dallas Wings; Sylvia Fowles – Minnesota Lynx; Candace Parker – Los Angeles Sparks	Best College Athlete: Baker Mayfield, Oklahoma Sooners; Jalen Brunson, Villanova Wildcats; Katie Ledecky, Stanford Cardinal; A'ja Wilson, South Carolina Gamecocks
Best Male Tennis Player: Roger Federer; Marin Čilić; Rafael Nadal	Best Female Tennis Player: Sloane Stephens; Simona Halep; Garbiñe Muguruza; Caroline Wozniacki
Best Male Golfer: Jordan Spieth; Dustin Johnson; Patrick Reed; Justin Thomas	Best Female Golfer: Sung-hyun Park; Shanshan Feng; Ariya Jutanugarn; Inbee Park
Best MLS Player: Nemanja Nikolić – Chicago Fire; Tim Melia – Sporting Kansas City; Ike Opara – Sporting Kansas City; Diego Valeri – Portland Timbers	Best NWSL Player: Megan Rapinoe – Seattle Reign FC; Adrianna Franch – Portland Thorns FC; Sam Kerr – Chicago Red Stars; Sam Mewis – North Carolina Courage
Best International Men's Soccer Player: Cristiano Ronaldo – Real Madrid C.F./Portugal; Lionel Messi – FC Barcelona/Argentina; Mohamed Salah – Liverpool F.C./Egypt; Neymar Jr. – Paris Saint-Germain F.C./Brazil	Best International Women's Soccer Player: Sam Kerr – Chicago Red Stars/Australia; Pernille Harder – VfL Wolfsburg/Denmark; Lieke Martens – FC Barcelona Femení/Netherlands; Jodie Taylor – Seattle Reign FC/England
Best Male Olympian: Shaun White, Snowboarding; Red Gerard, Snowboarding; John Shuster, Curling; David Wise, Halfpipe Skiing	Best Female Olympian: Chloe Kim, Snowboarding; Jamie Anderson, Snowboarding; Jocelyne Lamoureux-Davidson, Women's ice hockey; Mikaela Shiffrin, Skiing
Best Fighter: Terence Crawford, Boxing; Vasyl Lomachenko, Boxing; Rose Namajunas, MMA; Georges St-Pierre, MMA	Best Driver: Martin Truex Jr. – NASCAR; Brittany Force – NHRA; Lewis Hamilton – Formula One; Josef Newgarden – IndyCar
Best Jockey: José Ortiz; Florent Geroux; Flavien Prat; Mike Smith	Best Bowler: Rhino Page; Jason Belmonte; Tom Smallwood; Jesper Svensson
Best Male Action Sports Athlete: David Wise – Skiing; Henrik Harlaut – Skiing; Kelvin Hoefler – Skateboarding; Marcus Kleveland – Snowboarding	Best Female Action Sports Athlete: Chloe Kim – Snowboarding; Jamie Anderson – Snowboarding; Stephanie Gilmore – Surfing; Brighton Zeuner – Skateboarding
Best Male Athlete with a Disability: Mike Schultz – Snowboarding; Daniel Cnossen – Nordic Skiing; Declan Farmer – Sled Hockey; Andrew Kurka – Alpine Skiing	Best Female Athlete with a Disability: Brenna Huckaby – Snowboarding; Kendall Gretsch – Nordic Skiing; Oksana Masters – Nordic Skiing; Tatyana McFadden – Track and Field

== Honorary awards ==
Arthur Ashe Courage Award

- The 141 athletes who spoke out against former team doctor Larry Nassar about sexual abuse

Jimmy V Perseverance Award

- Jim Kelly

Pat Tillman Award for Service

- Jake Wood

Best Coach

- Aaron Feis, Scott Beigel and Chris Hixon – Coaches at Marjory Stoneman Douglas High School killed in the 2018 shooting

== In Memoriam ==
British singer Jorja Smith performed "Goodbyes" during the performance.

- Roy Halladay
- Bobby Doerr
- Edwin Jackson
- Augie Garrido
- Jana Novotná
- Billy Cannon
- Rollie Massimino
- Earle Bruce
- Don Baylor
- Jo Jo White
- Tyler Hilinski
- Anne Donovan
- James Hylton
- Terry Glenn
- Rusty Staub
- Mike Slive
- Hal Greer
- Dwight Clark
- Y. A. Tittle
- Gene Michael
- Connie Hawkins
- Jake LaMotta
- Bill Nack
- Keith Jackson
- Don Ohlmeyer
- Chameka Scott
- Bob Wolff
- Dan Gurney
- Ray Emery
- Bill Torrey
- Dick Enberg
