= 2017 ESPY Awards =

Athletic awards show

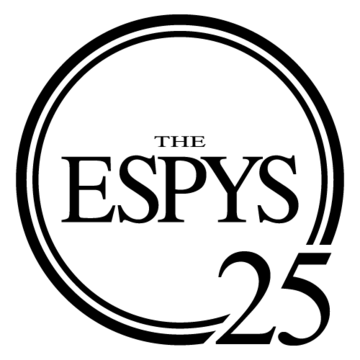
- The logo for the 25th annual ESPYs Awards
- Date: July 12, 2017
- Location: Microsoft Theater, Los Angeles, California
- Country: United States
- Hosted by: Peyton Manning

Television/radio coverage
- Network: ABC
- Runtime: 180 minutes

The 2017 ESPY Awards were presented at the 25th annual ESPY Awards show, held on July 12, 2017 at 5 pm Pacific at the Microsoft Theater in Los Angeles, California and on television nationwide in the United States on ABC at 8 pm Eastern/7 pm Central. On May 16, 2017, it was announced by ESPN.com that Peyton Manning would host the show. 33 competitive awards were presented, along with several honorary awards.

== Winners and nominees ==
These were the nominees for each of the competitive awards. Fans were able to vote online at a dedicated ESPN site. For "Best Play", fans voted on the plays Bracket-styled, with Round 1 of voting lasting from June 21 to June 27, Round 2 of voting lasting from June 28 to July 4, Round 3 of voting lasting from July 5 to July 11, and Round 4 of voting being on the day of the show, July 12.

Best Male Athlete: Russell Westbrook – Oklahoma City Thunder, NBA; Kris Bryant – Chicago Cubs, MLB; Sidney Crosby – Pittsburgh Penguins, Stanley Cup Finals & World Cup of Hockey; Michael Phelps – USA Swimming, Swimming; Kindlelon “Kobie” Respicio USA Swimming, Swimming at the Special Olympics	Best Female Athlete: Simone Biles – USA Gymnastics, Gymnastics; Katie Ledecky – USA Swimming, Swimming; Candace Parker – Los Angeles Sparks, WNBA; Serena Williams – USTA, WTA
Best Championship Performance: Kevin Durant, Golden State Warriors – 2017 NBA Finals; Tom Brady, New England Patriots – Super Bowl LI; Shay Knighten, Oklahoma Sooners – 2017 Women's College World Series; Deshaun Watson, Clemson Tigers – 2017 CFB National Championship	Best Breakthrough Athlete: Dak Prescott – Dallas Cowboys, NFL; Giannis Antetokounmpo – Milwaukee Bucks, NBA; Laurie Hernandez – USA Gymnastics, Gymnastics; Aaron Judge – New York Yankees, MLB; Christian Pulisic – Borussia Dortmund & USMNT, Soccer (Bundesliga & Copa América)
Best Record-Breaking Performance: Michael Phelps – extends his own record of most gold medals/Olympic gold medals; Bill Belichick – most Super Bowl wins by a Head coach; Diana Taurasi – breaks WNBA career scoring record; Russell Westbrook – most triple-doubles in a single NBA season	Best Upset: Mississippi State defeats Connecticut – Women's NCAA Basketball Final Four; Clemson defeats Alabama – 2017 CFB National Championship; Denis Istomin over Novak Djokovic – 2017 Australian Open 2nd Round
Best Game: Patriots vs. Falcons – Super Bowl LI; Cubs vs. Indians – Game 7, 2016 World Series; Federer vs. Nadal – 2017 Australian Open Final	Best Comeback Athlete: Jordy Nelson – Green Bay Packers, NFL; Matt Bush – Texas Rangers, MLB; Roger Federer – Swiss Tennis, ATP; Candace Parker – Los Angeles Sparks, WNBA
Best Play: Aaron Rodgers to Jared Cook; Julian Edelman Super Bowl catch; Noah Brown TD catch around defender 9/18/16; Mario Mandžukić goal in UEFA Champions League Final; Jarrod Dyson catch 8/25/16; Morgan William buzzer beater vs. UConn; Larry Nance dunk; Olivier Giroud scorpion kick goal; Warriors jump ball transition dunk; Lamar Jackson hurdles defender; Chris Coghlan leaps over catcher; Sidney Crosby one-handed goal; Northwestern buzzer beater; Edwin Encarnación walk off HR; Russell Westbrook buzzer beater; LeBron James dunk off the backboard	Best Team: Golden State Warriors – NBA; Chicago Cubs – MLB; Clemson Tigers – NCAA Division I FBS football; Pittsburgh Penguins – NHL; New England Patriots – NFL; South Carolina Gamecocks - NCAA Division I women's basketball; US Women's Gymnastics – Gymnastics
Best International Athlete: Usain Bolt – Track and Field; Canelo Álvarez – Boxing; Katinka Hosszú – Swimming; Conor McGregor – UFC; Cristiano Ronaldo – Real Madrid/Portugal	Best NFL player: Aaron Rodgers, Green Bay Packers – NFL Passing Touchdowns Leader (2016).; Tom Brady, New England Patriots – Super Bowl champion & Super Bowl MVP; Ezekiel Elliott, Dallas Cowboys – 2016 First-team All-Pro & NFL Offensive Rookie of the Year; Khalil Mack, Oakland Raiders – 2016 First-team All-Pro & NFL Defensive Player of the Year; Matt Ryan, Atlanta Falcons – Career highs in passing yards (4,944), Touchdowns (38), Passer rating (117.1), & completion percentage and a Career low in Interceptions (7). 2016 NFL Most Valuable Player, NFL Offensive Player of the Year (2016), 2016 First-team All-Pro, NFL Passer Rating Leader (2016) & Bert Bell Award winner (2016).
Best MLB player: Mike Trout, Los Angeles Angels of Anaheim – 2016 American League MVP & Best Major Leaguer. Led MLB with 123 Runs, 116 Walks, 3,014 Pitches faced in his Plate appearances, & a .441 On-base percentage. He also led the AL in these categories.; Kris Bryant, Chicago Cubs – 2016 National League MVP. Led MLB with 193 Games Played in the field. He also led the NL in these categories, plus led the NL with 116 Runs.; David Ortiz, Boston Red Sox – Best Hitter & Best Player-Fan Interaction. Retired from Major League Baseball following the 2016 MLB Season. Led MLB with 48 Doubles, 87 Extra-base hits, a .620 Slugging percentage, & a 1.021 On-base plus slugging. He also led the AL in these categories, plus he co-led the AL with 127 Runs Batted In alongside Edwin Encarnación.; Rick Porcello, Boston Red Sox – American League Cy Young Award winner. Led MLB with 22 Wins, a 5.91 K/BB. He also led the AL in these categories.; Max Scherzer, Washington Nationals – National League Cy Young Award winner, strikeout leader, Best Pitcher, & Best Performance. Led MLB with 284 Strikeouts, a .199 Batting average against, a 0.97 WHIP, and a .254 On-Base Against. He also led the NL in these categories, plus he led the NL with 20 Wins & a 5.07 K/BB (he co-led this with Noah Syndergaard.	Best NHL Player: Sidney Crosby, Pittsburgh Penguins – 2016 World Cup of Hockey Gold medalist with Team Canada, Winner of the 2016 World Cup of Hockey Most valuable player, 2016 World Cup of Hockey Leading/Top Scorer with 10 points, Winner of the 2017 Maurice "Rocket" Richard Trophy (Goals Leader/most goals in the regular season), Winner of the 2017 Conn Smythe Trophy (playoffs MVP), 2017 Eastern Conference Champion with the Pittsburgh Penguins, 2017 Stanley Cup Champion with the Pittsburgh Penguins, 2017 Pittsburgh Penguins Most valuable player, & made the NHL Second-All Star Team for the 2016–17 NHL season. Led the NHL with 44 Goals.; Sergei Bobrovsky, Columbus Blue Jackets – Winner of the 2017 Vezina Trophy (best goaltender) & made the NHL first All-Star team for the 2016–17 NHL season. Co-led the NHL with 0 Ties (co-led with the other 94 goalies in the league), and led the NHLl with a .931 Save percentage & a 2.06 GAA; Patrick Kane, Chicago Blackhawks – Made the NHL first All-Star team for the 2016–17 NHL season. Co-led the NHL with 82 Games played (co-led with 98 other players).; Auston Matthews, Toronto Maple Leafs – Winner of the 2017 Calder Memorial Trophy (best Rookie/NHL Rookie of the Year), was named Rookie of the Month in December, 2016, & made the NHL All-Rookie Team for the 2016–17 NHL season. Co-led the NHL with 82 Games played (co-led with 98 other players).; Connor McDavid, Edmonton Oilers – Winner of the 2017 Art Ross Trophy (leading scorer), Ted Lindsay Award (most outstanding player), and Hart Memorial Trophy (NHL MVP), & made the NHL first All-Star team for the 2016–17 NHL season. Led the NHL with 70 Assists, 100 Points, & 1.22 Points per game. Co-led the NHL with 82 Games played (co-led with 98 other players).
Best Driver: Lewis Hamilton, Formula One – 2016: Won the 2016 Monaco Grand Prix, 2016 Canadian Grand Prix, 2016 Austrian Grand Prix, 2016 British Grand Prix, 2016 Hungarian Grand Prix, 2016 German Grand Prix, 2016 United States Grand Prix, 2016 Mexican Grand Prix, 2016 Brazilian Grand Prix, & the 2016 Abu Dhabi Grand Prix. Ended up being 2nd in the final standings with 380 points (5 points shy of tying 1st place, 6 points shy of winning). 2017 (ongoing): Won the 2017 Chinese Grand Prix, 2017 Spanish Grand Prix, & the 2017 Canadian Grand Prix.; Ron Capps, NHRA – Won the 2016 NHRA Mello Yello Series Funny Car championship.; Jimmie Johnson, NASCAR – 2016 NASCAR Sprint Cup Champion. Only times he won a race during the season: 2016 Folds of Honor QuikTrip 500, 2016 Auto Club 400, 2016 Bank of America 500, 2016 Goody's Fast Relief 500, & 2016 Ford EcoBoost 400. 2017 (ongoing) has him ranked No. 7 so far, behind 6 other people in front of him. Races he has won so far this season: 2017 O'Reilly Auto Parts 500, 2017 Food City 500, & 2017 AAA 400 Drive for Autism.; Simon Pagenaud, IndyCar – 2016 IndyCar Series Champion. Only times he won a race during the season: 2016 Toyota Grand Prix of Long Beach, 2016 Honda Indy Grand Prix of Alabama, 2016 Grand Prix of Indianapolis, 2016 Honda Indy 200, & 2016 GoPro Grand Prix of Sonoma. 2017 (ongoing) has the defending champion ranked No. 2 right now, currently behind No. 1 ranked and former 4-time champion, Scott Dixon. Races he has won so far this season: 2017 Desert Diamond West Valley Phoenix Grand Prix.; Martin Truex Jr., NASCAR – 2016 was an 11th-place finish for him in the standings. Only times he won a race during the season: 2016 Bojangles' Southern 500, 2016 Teenage Mutant Ninja Turtles 400, & 2016 Citizen Soldier 400. 2017 (ongoing) has him ranked No. 2 so far, behind No. 1 ranked Kyle Larson. Races he has won so far this season: 2017 Kobalt 400 & 2017 Go Bowling 400.	Best NBA player: LeBron James, Cleveland Cavaliers; Kevin Durant, Golden State Warriors; James Harden, Houston Rockets; Kawhi Leonard, San Antonio Spurs; Russell Westbrook, Oklahoma City Thunder
Best WNBA player: Candace Parker, Los Angeles Sparks; Tina Charles, New York Liberty; Elena Delle Donne, Washington Mystics; Maya Moore, Minnesota Lynx; Nneka Ogwumike, Los Angeles Sparks	Best Fighter: Demetrious Johnson, MMA; Terence Crawford, Boxing; Gennady Golovkin, Boxing; Conor McGregor, MMA; Andre Ward, Boxing
Best Male Golfer: Sergio García; Brooks Koepka; Dustin Johnson; Rory McIlroy; Henrik Stenson	Best Female Golfer: Ariya Jutanugarn; In Gee Chun; Lydia Ko; So Yeon Ryu; Lexi Thompson
Best Male Tennis Player: Roger Federer; Andy Murray; Rafael Nadal; Stan Wawrinka	Best Female Tennis Player: Serena Williams; Angelique Kerber; Jeļena Ostapenko; Monica Puig

== Honorary awards ==
Arthur Ashe Courage Award

- Eunice Kennedy Shriver

Jimmy V Perseverance Award

- Jarrius Robertson

Pat Tillman Award for Service

- U.S. Air Force Master Sgt. Israel Del Toro

Best Moment

- Chicago Cubs win the World Series.

Icon Award

- Vin Scully

Muhammad Ali Humanitarian Award

- Mark Giordano of the Calgary Flames, NHL

Special Olympic Athletes

- Kindlelon “Kobie” Respicio for accomplishments in the Special Olympics and success in school

== In Memoriam ==
During the segment the music was "The Song for You" performed by Gallant.

- John Saunders
- José Fernández
- Dennis Byrd
- Ralph Branca
- Dennis Green
- Dan Rooney
- Yordano Ventura
- Bobby Chacon
- Jerry Krause
- Frank Deford
- Nate Thurmond
- Rubén Amaro Sr.
- Dallas Green
- LaVell Edwards
- Jack McCloskey
- Sam Foltz
- Craig Sager
- Jim Bunning
- Fab Melo
- Joao Havelange
- Mike Ilitch
- Joe McKnight
- Jimmy Piersall
- John Andariese
- Cortez Kennedy
- Luis Olmo
- Rashaan Salaam
- Bernie Custis
- Herve Filion
- Gene Conley
- Tony DiCicco
- Arnold Palmer
