= J. R. Salzman =

Darrell Salzman
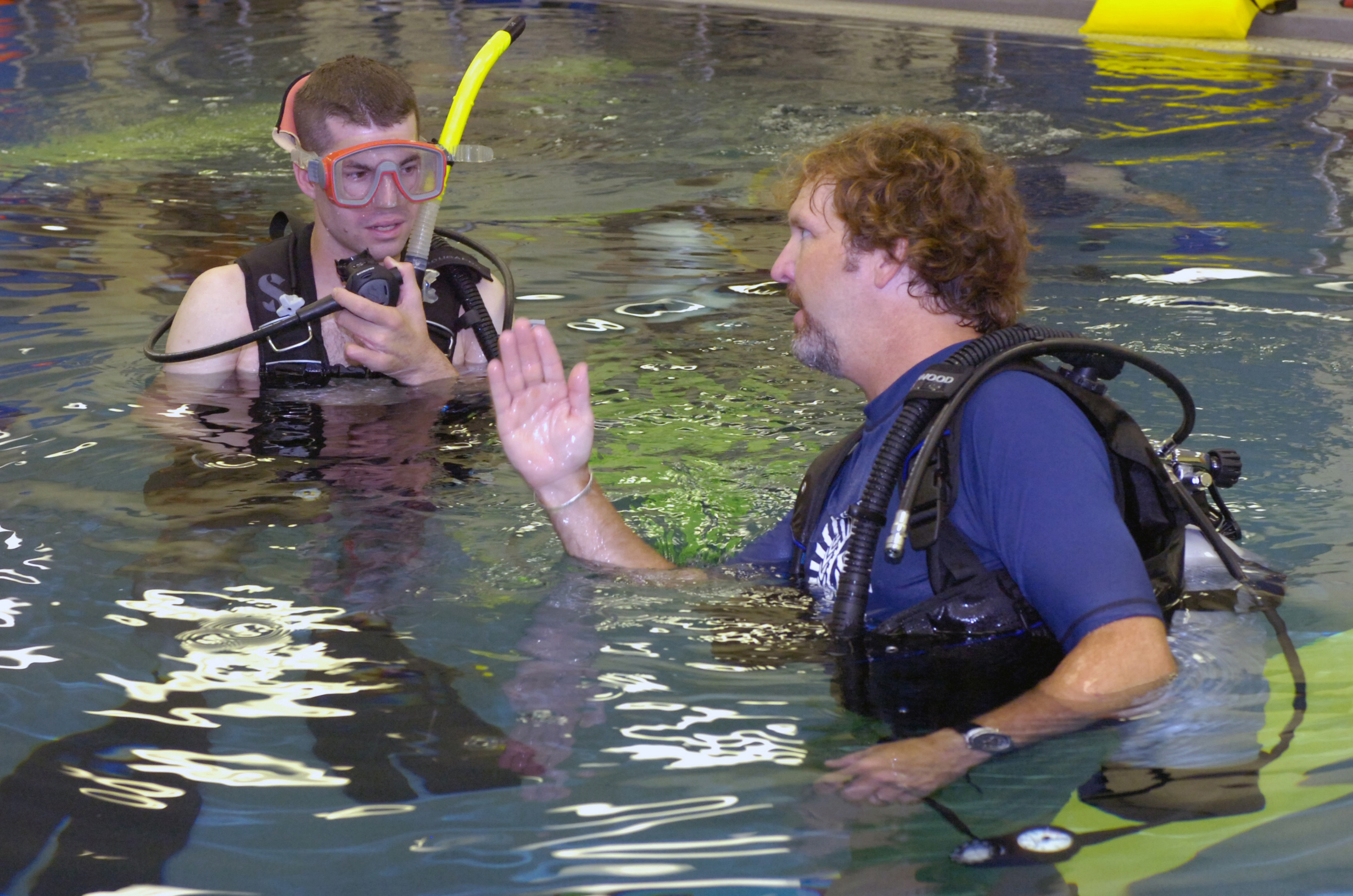
- Salzman (left) in 2007, learning diving at Walter Reed after his injury
- Born: 1979 (age 46–47); Hayward, Wisconsin, U.S.
- Military career
- Allegiance: United States of America
- Service years: 2003–2007
- Rank: Sergeant
- Nickname: "J.R."
- Unit: Minnesota Army National Guard: 34th Infantry Division
- Conflicts: Iraq War: Operation Iraqi Freedom (WIA)
- Awards: Purple Heart; Iraq Campaign Medal; Combat Infantry Badge
- Other work: Logroller
- Website: https://www.facebook.com/JR-Salzman-151734901536051/

Darrell "J.R." Salzman (born 1979) is a champion logroller and an Iraq War veteran. ESPN has called him "among the preeminent outdoors athletes" of the last decade.

Salzman grew up in Hayward, Wisconsin. His sisters, Tina Bosworth and Crystal Salzman, are also top logrollers. He attended the University of Minnesota Twin Cities, and graduated with a Bachelor of Science in Education from the University of Wisconsin–Stout.

== Career ==
=== Sports ===
Salzman was a competitor in log rolling and boom running, a sprint on floating logs, in all six seasons of ESPN's Great Outdoor Games, winning 14 medals (more than any other player). In 2005 he was awarded the Best Outdoor Sportsman ESPY.

Between 1998 and 2015, he won ten world titles at the Lumberjack World Championships in Hayward. Between 2010 and 2015, Salzman competed with the advanced effects of Lyme disease but despite this, he managed to secure two more world titles, tying with Canadian logroller Jubiel Wickheim for most logrolling titles.

Salzman used his log rolling skills as a stuntman in the film Cheaper by the Dozen 2.

Salzman runs a small business by the name of Salzman Custom Sawing which focussed on turning trees into lumber, slabs, furniture and various other products. He has also spent his time working as a freelance journalist, specifically writing about his endeavors in the military as well as right-wing politics.

=== Injury in Iraq ===
Salzman joined the National Guard, enlisting shortly after the second anniversary of the September 11, 2001 attacks. He was assigned to the Minnesota National Guard. His unit was activated as part of the 34th Infantry Division in the fall of 2005 and in the spring of 2006, he was deployed to Iraq.

On December 19, 2006, his vehicle was struck by an Explosively Formed Penetrator. His right arm was severed below the elbow, his left hand was pulverized by the blast, and he suffered a traumatic brain injury. He recovered at Walter Reed Army Medical Center and a nearby Fisher House, learning to use a prosthetic arm and recover his physical skills. He is considered 100 percent physically disabled. Nevertheless, after returning to Hayward, he successfully logrolled again, practicing with and without his prosthetic. Salzman returned to competition and won a log rolling world title in 2009.

== Personal life ==
Salzman runs a milblog, "Lumberjack in a Desert", on which he has recounted his military life and his medical recovery. When he completes his education, he hopes to go into teaching. Salzman married his girlfriend, Josie Salzman, on March 10, 2006, before he deployed to Iraq. They have since divorced. Together they have one son.

== Bibliography ==
- Salzman, J. R. (October 2, 2013). "C.O.P.S. Camp: Not Your Ordinary Summer Camp". NRA American Warrior. National Rifle Association.
