= Dock jumping =

Dog sport

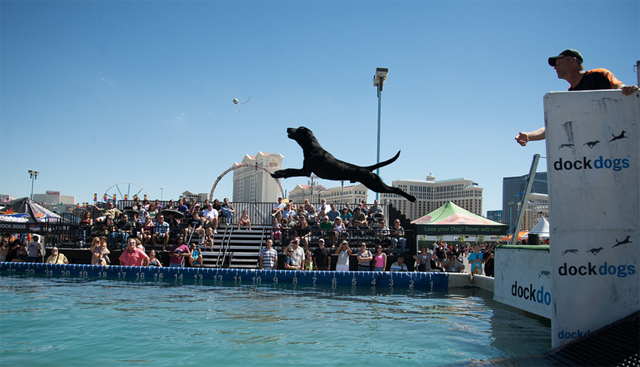
A dog competes in dock jumping

Dock jumping, also known as dock diving, is a dog sport in which dogs compete in jumping for distance or height from a dock into a body of water.

There are dock jumping events in the United States and other countries such as United Kingdom, Australia, Germany, and Austria.

== History ==
Dock jumping first appeared in 1997 at the Incredible Dog Challenge, an event sponsored and produced by pet food manufacturer Purina. There are now a number of organizations that run dock jumping competitions in different countries.

In the United States, DockDogs was established in 2000; its first event was at the ESPN 2000 Great Outdoor Games competition.

The Super Retriever Series Super Dock was established in 2002 and created as a qualifier for ESPN Great Outdoor Games along with the Super Retriever Series Retriever Trials. The Super Retriever Series Dock is a competition but also allows for titles through the United Kennel Club which started in 2014. The SRS Dock events held are Super Fly, Super Vertical (V) and Raider Run which is a timed swimming event. www.superretrieverseries.com

Splash Dogs was started in 2003. Ultimate Air Dogs was founded in 2005, by former Major League Baseball player Milt Wilcox. In 2008, UAD partnered with the United Kennel Club (UKC) which added dock jumping as a recognized UKC sport. In 2009, UKC also recognized competitions run by Splash Dogs. Dogs can get UKC titles by competing in dock distance or height jumping like they can in agility, obedience, weight pulling, and others.

North American Diving Dogs was founded by Debra Markwardt in 2014 and offers diving dog titles recognized by the American Kennel Club (AKC) and Canadian Kennel Club (CKC).

In the United Kingdom, Dash 'n' Splash, which runs competitions across southern England, was established in 2005, followed by JettyDogs in 2007.

K9 Aqua Sports was started in 2014, and runs competitions across all of England and Scotland

== Dock ==
The dock is usually 36 to 40 ft (11 to 12 m) long by 8 ft (2.4 m) wide and 2 ft (0.6 m) above the water surface, but may differ depending on the sanctioning organization. Any body of water or pool that is at least 4 ft (1.2 m) deep can be used. The dock is covered in artificial turf, carpet, or a rubber mat for better traction and safety for the competitors. The handler may use any amount of the dock and they may start their dog from any point on the dock when competing.

== Official jump distance ==
An example of jump measurement

The jump distance is measured, by most organizations, from the lateral midpoint of the end of the dock to the point at which the base of the dog's tail (where the tail meets the body) breaks the water's surface. DockDogs Big Air Discipline measures the distance to the point that the base of the dog's tail breaks the surface of the water. Purina's Incredible Diving Dog event measures the distance to the point that the dog's nose is at when its body enters the water. The jump distance is measured electronically using digital video freeze frame technology or, in some cases, is measured manually by judges.

Each team takes two jumps in round-robin format. The longer of the two jumps is that team's score for that competition. A jump in which the dog's tail enters the water at a point further from the dock than another part of the dog's body is scored using the point of the dog (for example, the head/nose) that breaks the surface of the water closest to the dock. If the dog's strides are off so that the dog starts its jump before the end of the dock, that is a disadvantage, because the jump is always judged from the edge of the dock, not from where the dog leaves the dock. A jump is only official if or when the toy leaves the handler's hand. The dog is not required to retrieve the toy for the jump to count.

== Extreme Vertical, Speed Retrieve, and Iron Dog ==
In the Spring of 2005, DockDogs introduced Extreme Vertical, a vertical jumping competition as its second discipline into the program. A "Bumper" is suspended 8 feet from the edge of the dock, starting a 4'6" from the dock surface, teams attempt to remove the bumper from the Extreme Vertical Apparatus. Rounds continue with the bumper being raised in 2 inch increments per round until the dog that jumps the highest wins! In 2008, DockDogs premiered the newest discipline to Canine Aquatics called Speed Retrieve, a timed run, jump, and swim of 58 feet, with 20 feet on the dock and 38 feet in the pool. Utilizing a proprietary scoring system, the Gen3 Speed Retrieve System was developed to accurately measure to the thousandths of a second of when a dog completes their run. This same system is also utilized to run Dueling Dogs as well. In 2010, DockDogs introduced Iron Dog, which combined Big Air, Extreme Vertical, and Speed Retrieve into its own "triathlon" that calculates a score from a points table from their best achieved scores at an event.

== Hydro Dash and Air Retrieve ==
Most prevalent in North American Diving Dogs competitions (NADD), there are additional disciplines offered at competitions. In Hydro Dash, the toy is suspended at the end of the pool and the goal is for the dog to retrieve it in as short of time as possible. The Dog's back feet must be entirely in front of the 10 ft line for open dogs and 7 ft for Lap dogs. When released, the dog will jump into the pool, swim to the bumper hanging from the HydroDash rig, and make the bumper release completely from the clips. Once it has removed the bumper from both clips, the dog will swim back to the 10-foot line to complete their attempt. The dog is not required to retrieve the bumper. Time will stop once the dog swims back to the 10-foot line in the pool. Ihe other division is Air Retrieve. Dogs must jump for a bumper, which hangs in the middle of the dock's width, two feet above the dock. The goal is for the dog to either grab or completely remove the bumper form the apparatus. Each dog will get two attempts at knocking down the bumper at each distance.

== Techniques ==
A place and send jump

A chase jump

Two different techniques can be used to encourage the dog to jump into the water.

=== Place and send ===
Walk the dog to the end of the dock and or, hold the dog back while throwing the toy into the water. Walk the dog back to the starting point, place the dog, then release or send the dog to go get the toy. This is effective for dogs that are not trained to wait or stay on the dock, especially if they have a lot of speed and can compensate for the lack of lift at the end of the dock.

=== Chase ===
The dog is placed in a stay or wait at its starting position on the dock. The handler walks to the end of the dock holding the toy, then calls the dog and throws the toy, trying to keep the toy just in front of the dog's nose so they chase it into the water. The goal is to use this method to get the dog at the optimum launch angle to increase distance by getting him to jump up, instead of just out or flat, as with place and send. The chase method is difficult to master. However, if the dog is toy-driven, he can be trained to follow the toy.

== Divisions ==
There are many divisions depending on the sanctioning organization. All teams are ranked according to how far they jump and are rated against teams within their own divisions for placements. Even small dogs have their own division, "lap dogs", along with older dogs (8 years and older), the "veteran" division. DockDogs also recognizes dogs over the age of 10 with their "Legend Dog" division.

Ultimate Air Dogs		Splash Dogs		DockDogs	
Division	Distance	Division	Distance	Division	Distance
Novice	up to 9 ft 11 in (3.02 m)	Splash	up to 9 ft 11 in (3.02 m)	Novice	up to 9 ft 11 in (3.02 m)
Junior	10 ft (3.05 m) to 14 ft 11 in (4.55 m)	Junior	10 ft (3.05 m) to 14 ft 11 in (4.55 m)	Junior	10 ft (3.05 m) to 14 ft 11 in (4.55 m)
Senior	15 ft (4.57 m) to 19 ft 11 in (6.07 m)	Senior	15 ft (4.57 m) to 19 ft 11 in (6.07 m)	Senior	15 ft (4.57 m) to 19 ft 11 in (6.07 m)
Master	20 ft (6.10 m) to 22 ft 5 in (6.83 m)	Pro	20 ft (6.10 m) to 22 ft 11 in (6.99 m)	Master	20 ft (6.10 m) to 22 ft 11 in (6.99 m)
Ultimate	over 22 ft 6 in (6.86 m)	Extreme	over 23 ft (7.01 m)	Elite	23 ft (7.01 m) to 24 ft 11 in (7.59 m)
				Super Elite	over 25 ft (7.62 m)

== Notable competitions ==
- ESPN's Great Outdoor Games
- Super Retriever Series
- DockDogs World Championships
- Dueling Dogs World Championships

== Records ==
Date	Distance	Dog	Handler	Event	Location	Reference
7 July 2000	22 ft 4 in (6.81 m)	Heidi	Beth Gutteridge	ESPN Great Outdoor Games	Lake Placid, NY	
8 July 2001	23 ft 1 in (7.04 m)	Jerry	Mike Wallace	ESPN Great Outdoor Games	Lake Placid, NY	
20 February 2002	23 ft 3 in (7.09 m)	Little Morgan	Mike Jackson	Indianapolis Boat, Sport & Travel Show	Indianapolis, IN	
1 May 2002	23 ft 4 in (7.11 m)	Haley	John Kline	ESPN2 Super Retriever Series	Northfield, MN	
6 July 2002	26 ft 6 in (8.08 m)	Little Morgan	Mike Jackson	ESPN Great Outdoor Games	Lake Placid, NY	
7 August 2005	27 ft 5 in (8.36 m)	Country	Kevin Meese	Bass Pro Shops	Baltimore, MD	
21 August 2005	28 ft 7 in (8.71 m)	Country	Kevin Meese	Big Nickle time Cabela's	Hamburg, PA	
9 October 2005	28 ft 10 in (8.79 m)	Country	Kevin Meese	Bass Pro Shops	Baltimore, MD	
30 May 2010	28 ft 11.59 in (8.829 m)	Quasi	Rande Murphy	Super Retriever Series Crown Championship	Little Rock, AR	
11 July 2010	29 ft 1 in (8.86 m)	Smoke	Melissa Ness	2010 UKC Premier	Richmond, IN	
29 May 2011	29 ft 7 in (9.017 m)	Baxter	Tony Lampert	Super Retriever Series Crown Championship	Little Rock, AR	
4 August 2012	31 ft 0 in (9.449 m)	Cochiti	Diane Salts	DockDogs Clark County Fair	Ridgefield, WA	
2012	31 ft 0 in (9.449 m)	Taz (tie with Cochiti)				
18 December 2018		Sounders	Laurel Behnke	2018 North America Diving Dogs/American Kennel Club National Championships	Orlando, Florida	
July 2019	35 ft 3 in (10.744 m)	Slingshot	Rachael Brinkman			
14 August 2019	35 ft 6 in (10.820 m)	Sounders	Laurel Behnke	AKC 2019 Olympic Kennel Club	Enumclaw, Washington	
22 September 2019	36 ft 2 in (11.024 m)	Sounders	Laurel Behnke		Santa Clara, CA	
