= Muhammad Ali Sports Humanitarian Award =

Annual award

- Awarded for: Humanitarian of the Year
- Location: Los Angeles, California, U.S.
- Presented by: ESPN
- First award: 2015
- Currently held by: Sloane Stephens
- Website: espn.com/espys/

The Muhammad Ali Sports Humanitarian Award has been presented annually at the ESPY Awards since 2015. Formerly the Sports Humanitarian of the Year Award, it was renamed in 2017 to honor the legacy of Muhammad Ali's impact on society. The award is given to an athlete whose continuous, demonstrated leadership has created a measured positive impact on their community through sports. The candidate must embrace the core principles that Muhammad Ali embodied so well, including confidence, conviction, dedication, giving and respect.

== Winners ==
- 2015: Tamika Catchings, Indiana Fever
- 2016: Chris Paul, Los Angeles Clippers
- 2017: Mark Giordano, Calgary Flames
- 2018: Kevin Durant, Golden State Warriors
- 2019: Chris Long, Retired NFL Player
- 2020: Nelson Cruz, Minnesota Twins
- 2021: Laurent Duvernay-Tardif, Kansas City Chiefs
- 2022: Albert Pujols, St. Louis Cardinals
- 2023: Jrue Holiday, Milwaukee Bucks; Lauren Holiday, Retired U.S. Women's National Team
- 2024: Maui Surfing Community
- 2025: Sloane Stephens, Tennis Player
- 2026: Stephen Curry, Golden State Warriors

== See also ==
- ESPY Awards
- Arthur Ashe Courage Award
- Muhammad Ali
