= 2006 ESPY Awards =

Athletic awards show

The 2006 ESPY Awards were hosted by Lance Armstrong at Dolby Theatre, Los Angeles:

== Winners ==
=== Special awards ===
- Arthur Ashe Courage and Humanitarian Award – Afghan female soccer players
- Best Comeback – Tedy Bruschi

=== Best in sport ===
- Best Female Athlete – Annika Sorenstam
- Best Male Athlete – Lance Armstrong
- Best Team – Pittsburgh Steelers
- Best Coach/Manager – Bill Cowher
- Best Championship Performance – Vince Young
- Best International Athlete – Albert Pujols
- Best Breakthrough Athlete of the Year – Chris Paul
- Outstanding Female Athlete of the Year – Annika Sorenstam
- Outstanding Male Athlete of the Year – Lance Armstrong
- Outstanding Team of the Year – Pittsburgh Steelers

=== Individual sports ===
- Outstanding Baseball Performer of the Year – Albert Pujols
- Outstanding Pro Football Performer of the Year – Shaun Alexander
- Outstanding Men’s Pro Basketball Performer of the Year – Dwyane Wade
- Outstanding Pro Hockey Performer of the Year – Jaromír Jágr
- Outstanding Men’s Tennis Performer of the Year – Roger Federer
- Outstanding Women’s Tennis Performer of the Year – Venus Williams
- Outstanding Women’s Pro Basketball Performer of the Year – Sheryl Swoopes
- Outstanding Female Action Sports Athlete – Hannah Teter
- Outstanding Male Action Sports Athlete – Shaun White
- Outstanding Men’s Track Performer of the Year – Justin Gatlin
- Outstanding Women’s Track Performer of the Year – Allyson Felix
- Outstanding Soccer Performer of the Year – Ronaldinho
- Best MLS Player – Landon Donovan
- Best Golfer – Tiger Woods
- Outstanding Jockey of the Year – Edgar Prado
- Outstanding Bowling Performer of the Year – Walter Ray Williams Jr.
- Outstanding Auto Racing Performer of the Year – Tony Stewart

=== Other awards ===
- Best Sports Movie – Glory Road
- Best Male College Athlete – Reggie Bush
- Best Female College Athlete – Cat Osterman
- Best Female Athlete with a Disability – Sarah Reinertsen
- Best Male Athlete with a Disability – Bobby Martin
- Best Angler – Tammy Richardson
- Best U.S. Olympian – Shaun White
- Memorable Performance (Best Moment) – Jason McElwain’s 20 points in his lone high school game
- Game of the Year – Rose Bowl, USC vs. Texas
- Most Spectacular Play of the Year – Tyrone Prothro’s catch vs. Southern Mississippi
- Record Breaking Performance of the Year – Shaun Alexander’s NFL‑record 28 touchdowns in one season

=== Sponsored awards ===
- Under Armour Undeniable Performance Award – Kobe Bryant
- GMAC Professional Grade Award – Doug Flutie
