= Best Angler ESPY Award =

Annual athletic award (2006–2006)

- Awarded for: best angler
- Location: Los Angeles (2006)
- Presented by: ESPN
- First award: 2006
- Final award: 2006
- Currently held by: Tammy Richardson (USA)
- Website: www.espn.co.uk/espys/

The Best Angler ESPY Award was an annual award honoring the achievements of an athlete from the world of angling. It was presented as part of the ESPY Awards at the 2006 ceremony and it replaced the non-gender specific Best Outdoor Sportsman ESPY Award before the latter accolade was reinstated for the 2007 edition. The Best Angler ESPY Award trophy, designed by sculptor Lawrence Nowlan, was presented to the amateur or professional angling sport fisherman, irrespective of gender or nationality, adjudged to be the best in a given calendar year; although the accolade may technically be presented to an angler of any fish, in practice only bass fishermen are considered as nominees. Balloting for the award is undertaken by fans over the Internet from between three and five choices selected by the ESPN Select Nominating Committee, which is composed of a panel of experts. It was conferred in July to reflect performance and achievement over the preceding twelve months. The sole winner of the Best Angler ESPY Award was Tammy Richardson, who finished runner-up in the final Women's Bassmaster Angler of the Year standings for the 2006 season.

== Winner and nominees ==
Best Angler ESPY Award winner and nominees
Year	Athlete	Nationality	Nominees	Refs
2006	Tammy Richardson	USA	Preston Clark (USA); Greg Hackney (USA); Ish Monroe (USA)	

== See also ==
- Best Outdoor Sportsman ESPY Award
- Bassmaster Classic
