= Best Bowler ESPY Award =

Annual athletic award

The Best Bowler ESPY Award has been presented annually since 1995 to the best ten-pin bowler, irrespective of gender, adjudged to be the best in a given calendar year of those contesting the sport professionally in the United States. To date, the award has only been presented to male bowlers.

Between 1993 and 2004 the award voting panel comprised variously fans; sportswriters and broadcasters, sports executives, and retired sportspersons, termed collectively experts; and ESPN personalities, but balloting thereafter has been exclusively by fans over the Internet from amongst choices selected by the ESPN Select Nominating Committee.

Through the 2001 iteration of the ESPY Awards, ceremonies were conducted in February of each year to honor achievements over the previous calendar year; awards presented thereafter are conferred in June and reflect performance from the June previous. The award wasn't awarded in 2020 due to the COVID-19 pandemic.

== List of winners ==
Year	Bowler	Nation of citizenship
1995	Norm Duke	United States
1996	Mike Aulby	United States
1997	Bob Learn Jr.	United States
1998	Walter Ray Williams, Jr.	United States
1999	Walter Ray Williams, Jr.	United States
2000	Parker Bohn III	United States
2001	Walter Ray Williams, Jr.	United States
2002	Pete Weber	United States
2003	Walter Ray Williams, Jr.	United States
2004	Pete Weber	United States
2005	Walter Ray Williams, Jr.	United States
2006	Walter Ray Williams, Jr.	United States
2007	Norm Duke	United States
2008	Norm Duke	United States
2009	Norm Duke	United States
2010	Walter Ray Williams, Jr.	United States
2011	Jason Belmonte	Australia
2012	Sean Rash	United States
2013	Pete Weber	United States
2014	Pete Weber	United States
2015	Jason Belmonte	Australia
2016	Jason Belmonte	Australia
2017	Jason Belmonte	Australia
2018	Rhino Page	United States
2019	Norm Duke	United States
2020	Not awarded due to the COVID-19 pandemic	
2021	Tom Daugherty	United States
2022	Kyle Troup	United States

== See also ==
- Professional Bowlers Association
- Professional Women's Bowling Association
- United States Bowling Congress
