= Great Outdoor Games =

Great Outdoor Games was a series of televised outdoor games created by ESPN. The program was cancelled in 2006. Sean Duffy was a commentator and lumberjack.

Great Outdoor Games individual events include:

- Fishing Events
  - Fly Fishing
  - Freshwater Doubles
- Sporting Dog Events
  - Agility
  - Disc Drive (disc dog)
  - Big Air (dock jumping)
  - Flyball (flyball)
  - Retriever Trials (field trial)
- Target Events
  - Archery
  - Rifle
  - Shotgun
- Timber Events
  - Boom Run
  - Log rolling
  - Team Relay
  - Endurance
  - Speed Climbing
  - Tree Topping
  - Hot Saw
  - Springboard
- New Events for 2014
  - Dump 'Em Out
  - Log Jam
