= Best NWSL Player ESPY Award =

Annual athletic award

- Awarded for: best NWSL player
- Presented by: ESPN
- First award: 2018
- Currently held by: Ashley Hatch (USA)
- Website: www.espn.com/espys/

The Best NWSL Player ESPY Award is an annual award honoring the achievements of an individual from the National Women's Soccer League (NWSL). It has been awarded annually since the first award at the 2018 ESPY Awards. It was not awarded in 2020 due to the COVID-19 pandemic.

== Winners and nominees ==
Player's team won the NWSL Challenge Cup
Player's team lost in the NWSL Challenge Cup

Best NWSL Player ESPY Award winners and nominees
Year	Image	Player	Nation	Team	Position	Other nominees	Ref(s)
2018		Megan Rapinoe	USA	Seattle Reign FC (Note: Now known as OL Reign.)	Midfielder	Adrianna Franch (USA) – Portland Thorns FC; Sam Kerr (AUS) – Chicago Red Stars; Sam Mewis (USA) – North Carolina Courage	
2019		Sam Kerr	AUS	Chicago Red Stars	Forward	Abby Erceg (NZL) – North Carolina Courage; Adrianna Franch (USA) – Portland Thorns FC; Lindsey Horan (USA) – Portland Thorns FC	
2020	Not awarded due to the COVID-19 pandemic						
2021		Julie Ertz	USA	Chicago Red Stars	Midfielder	Rachel Daly (ENG) – Houston Dash; Kailen Sheridan (CAN) – NJ/NY Gotham FC; Lynn Williams (USA) – North Carolina Courage	
2022		Ashley Hatch	USA	Washington Spirit	Forward	Aubrey Kingsbury (USA) – Washington Spirit; Caprice Dydasco (WAL) – NJ/NY Gotham FC; Jess Fishlock (USA) – OL Reign	

== Statistics ==
Multiple winners and nominees
Name	Wins	Nominations
Sam Kerr	1	2
Adrianna Franch	0	2

Winners by team represented
Team	Wins	Nominations
Chicago Red Stars	2	3
OL Reign	1	2
Washington Spirit	1	2
Portland Thorns FC	0	3
North Carolina Courage	0	3
Houston Dash	0	1
NJ/NY Gotham FC	0	2

Winners by nation represented
Country	Winners	Nominations
USA	3	10
AUS	1	2
CAN	0	1
ENG	0	1
NZL	0	1
WAL	0	1
