= 2013 ESPY Awards =

Athletic awards show

The 2013 ESPY Awards were announced from the Nokia Theatre on the 17th of July 2013, and were live on ESPN. ESPY Award is an abbreviation for Excellence in Sports Performance.

The awards show was hosted by Jon Hamm.

== Winners ==
- Best Female Athlete: Serena Williams, Tennis
- Best Male Athlete: LeBron James, Miami Heat
- Best Team: Miami Heat
- Best Coach/Manager: Rick Pitino, Louisville Cardinals men's basketball
- Best Comeback Player: Adrian Peterson, Minnesota Vikings
- Best Game -– San Antonio Spurs vs. Miami Heat, NBA Finals Game 6
- Best Moment—Jack Hoffman, 7 year old cancer patient rushes for touchdown at Nebraska spring game
- Best Play—Hit by Jadeveon Clowney.
- Best Championship Performance -- LeBron James, Miami Heat
- Best Upset -— #15 Florida Gulf Coast beats #2 Georgetown in 2nd round of 2013 NCAA Men's Division I Basketball Tournament
- Best Male College Athlete -- Johnny Manziel, Texas A&M
- Best Female College Athlete -- Brittney Griner, Baylor
- Best International Athlete -- Usain Bolt, Sprinter
- Best Record-Breaking Performance -- Michael Phelps, Swimmer
- Breakthrough Athlete of the Year -- Colin Kaepernick, San Francisco 49ers
- Best Male Action Sports Athlete --Nyjah Huston, Skateboarder
- Best Female Action Sports Athlete -- Stephanie Gilmore, Surfer
- Best Male Athlete with a Disability -- Jeremy Campbell, Pentathlon, Discus
- Best Female Athlete with a Disability -- Jessica Long, Swimming
- Best Male Olympic Athlete — Michael Phelps, Swimmer
- Best Female Olympic Athlete — Missy Franklin, Swimmer
- Best Driver -- Ryan Hunter-Reay, IndyCar Series
- Fighter of the Year -- Floyd Mayweather, Boxing
- NBA Player of the Year— LeBron James, Miami Heat
- NFL Player of the Year -- Adrian Peterson, Minnesota Vikings
- NHL Player of the Year -- Sidney Crosby, Pittsburgh Penguins
- MLB Player of the Year -- Miguel Cabrera, Detroit Tigers
- WNBA Player of the Year -- Candace Parker, Los Angeles Sparks
- Best Bowler -- Pete Weber
- Best Female Golfer -- Stacy Lewis
- Best Male Golfer -- Tiger Woods
- Best Jockey -- Joel Rosario
- Best MLS Player -- Thierry Henry, Red Bulls
- Best Male Tennis Player -- Novak Djokovic
- Best Female Tennis Player -- Serena Williams
