= 2007 ESPY Awards =

Athletic awards show

The 2007 ESPY Awards were hosted by LeBron James & Jimmy Kimmel at Dolby Theatre, Los Angeles:

== Winners ==
=== Special awards ===
- Arthur Ashe Courage Award – Trevor Ringland and Dave Cullen
- Jimmy V Award for Perseverance – Kay Yow
- Best Comeback – No award given

=== Best in sport ===
- Best Female Athlete – Taryne Mowatt
- Best Male Athlete – LaDainian Tomlinson
- Best Team – Indianapolis Colts
- Best Coach/Manager – Tony Dungy
- Best Game – 2007 Fiesta Bowl: Boise State defeat Oklahoma
- Best Championship Performance – Peyton Manning
- Best Moment – New Orleans Saints return home, beat Falcons on Monday Night Football
- Best Play – Boise State “Statue of Liberty” 2‑point conversion vs. Oklahoma
- Best Finish – Dodgers vs. Padres, tie and win in 10th on Nomar Garciaparra home run
- Best Upset – Golden State Warriors over Dallas Mavericks in first round of NBA playoffs
- Best Breakthrough Athlete – Devin Hester
- Best Record‑Breaking Performance – LaDainian Tomlinson
- Best Sports Movie – Talladega Nights: The Ballad of Ricky Bobby
- Best Male College Athlete – Kevin Durant
- Best Female College Athlete – Taryne Mowatt
- Best Male Athlete with a Disability – Casey Tibbs
- Best Female Athlete with a Disability – Jessica Long
- Best International Athlete – Roger Federer
- Best Track and Field Athlete – Jeremy Wariner

=== Individual sports ===
- Best Baseball Player – Derek Jeter
- Best NBA Player – LeBron James
- Best WNBA Player – Lisa Leslie
- Best NFL Player – LaDainian Tomlinson
- Best NHL Player – Sidney Crosby
- Best MLS Player – Landon Donovan
- Best Male Action Sports Athlete – Travis Pastrana
- Best Female Action Sports Athlete – Sarah Burke
- Best Bowler – Norm Duke
- Best Driver – Jeff Gordon
- Best Fighter – Floyd Mayweather Jr.
- Best Golfer – Tiger Woods
- Best Jockey – Calvin Borel
- Best Outdoor Athlete – Dean Karnazes
- Best Male Tennis Player – Roger Federer
- Best Female Tennis Player – Maria Sharapova

=== Sponsored awards ===
- Hummer "Like Nothing Else" Award – LaDainian Tomlinson
- Under Armour Undeniable Performance Award – Tennessee Lady Volunteers basketball
