= Logrolling (sport) =

Water sport

Log rolling, sometimes called birling, is a sparring sport involving two competitors, each standing on one end of a free-floating log in a body of water. The two battle to dislodge each other from the log while keeping their own footing on it by spinning and kicking it and various other means. In the United States, an official organized logrolling competition is called a roleo.

In the related sport of boom running, competitors each run an adjacent boom, or coupled line, of floating logs in both directions, vying to finish first without falling into the water.

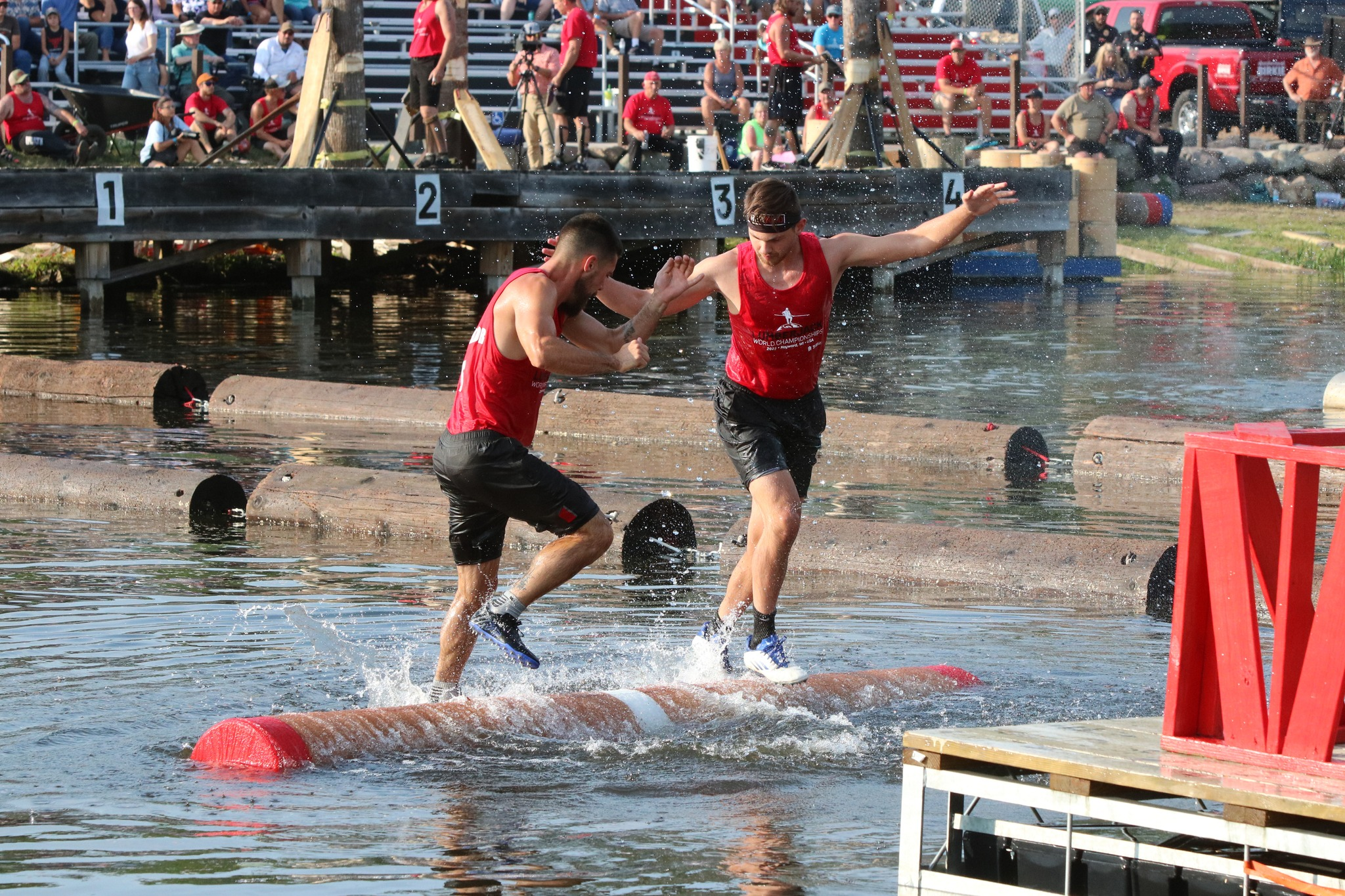
Elite Class logrollers Anthony Polentini (right) and Caleb Graves (left) compete in the quarterfinals at the 2023 Logrolling World Championships in Hayward, Wisconsin

== Log sizes ==
There are four different sizes of logs currently used in competitions, though there are many other custom sizes used in training. Each log size has a unique number and color associated with it. In the United States, the dimensions of the logs are standardized by the United States Log Rolling Association (USLRA), while CAN-LOG (Canadian Logger Sports Association) standardizes the sizes in Canada.

=== USLRA professional men sizes ===
Log	Diameter	Length
I	15 inches (38 cm)	12 feet (3.7 m)
II	14 inches (36 cm)	12 feet (3.7 m)
III	13 inches (33 cm)	13 feet (4.0 m)
IV	12 inches (30 cm)	13 feet (4.0 m)

=== USLRA professional women sizes ===
Log	Diameter	Length
II	14 inches (36 cm)	12 feet (3.7 m)
III	13 inches (33 cm)	13 feet (4.0 m)
IV	12 inches (30 cm)	13 feet (4.0 m)

=== USLRA amateur sizes ===
Log	Diameter	Length
I	15 inches (38 cm)	12 feet (3.7 m)
II	14 inches (36 cm)	12 feet (3.7 m)
III	13 inches (33 cm)	13 feet (4.0 m)
IV	12 inches (30 cm)	13 feet (4.0 m)
V	11 inches (28 cm)	13 feet (4.0 m)

=== CAN-LOG sizes ===
Log	Diameter	Length
I	17 inches (43 cm)	12 or 13 feet (3.7 or 4.0 m)
II	15 inches (38 cm)	12 or 13 feet (3.7 or 4.0 m)
III	13.5 inches (34 cm)	12 or 13 feet (3.7 or 4.0 m)
IV	12 inches (30 cm)	12 or 13 feet (3.7 or 4.0 m)

== United States Logrolling Association ==
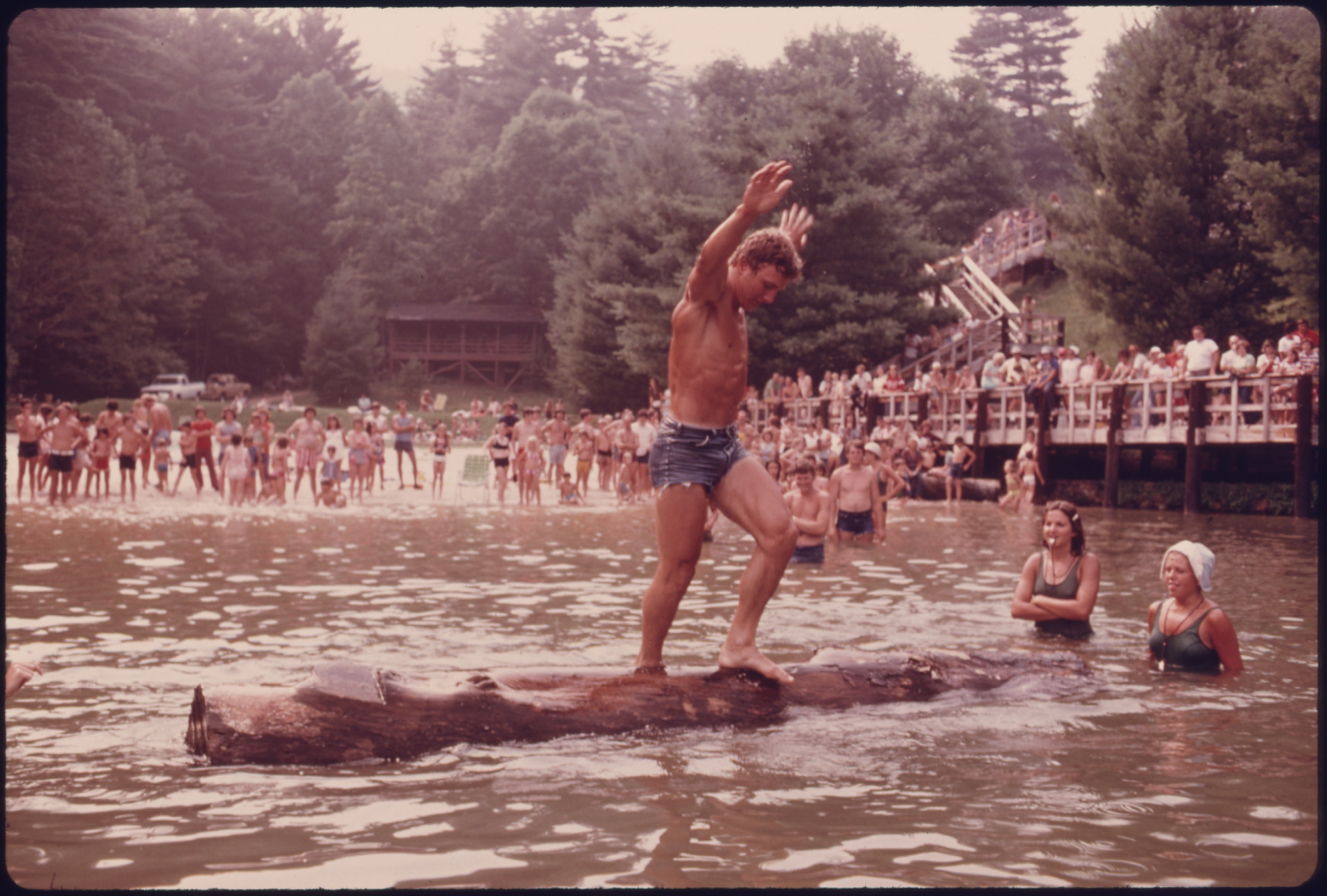
Log rolling near Robertstown, Georgia at Unicoi State Park, July 1975

The US Logrolling Association (USLRA) is the national governing body of the sports of log rolling and boom running. It is the first national member of the International Logrolling Association (ILRA). The Association is responsible for overseeing rules, regulations, and rankings, and also works to grow and promote the sports of logrolling and boom running in the United States.

== CAN-LOG ==
Can-Log was established in the late 1960s to promote the sport of logrolling in Canada, set rules and regulations, and allow for the allocation of Canadian Championship events to the participating competitions.

== Rules ==
The match begins when the whistle is blown or "Time in" is called by the head judge and continues until a fall occurs or the time limit expires (The judge may recall a quick whistle if they feel that the rollers did not have equal control.). The first athlete to lose contact with the log with both feet and fall off the log loses the fall. The last athlete to lose contact with the log wins the fall. For all amateur and professional divisions, matches consist of three out of five falls.

Tournaments can either run with a round-robin format (each athlete competes in a match against everyone in their division once) or double elimination bracket (a consolation bracket system in which rollers move higher in the competition each time they win a match or fall lower in the competition each time they lose a match).

== Notable Competitors ==
J. R. Salzman is a former Men’s Professional logroller. In 2006, he suffered a serious limb injury while deployed in the Iraq War, returning to competition with a prosthetic arm in 2009.

Judy Scheer-Hoeschler, a retired seven-time Women’s Professional world champion, is credited as the founder of many of the world's most successful logrolling programs.
