= 2004 ESPY Awards =

Athletic awards show

The 2004 ESPY Awards were hosted by Jamie Foxx at Dolby Theatre, Los Angeles:

== Winners ==
=== Cross-cutter categories ===
- Best Female Athlete – Diana Taurasi
- Best Male Athlete – Lance Armstrong
- Best Team – Detroit Pistons
- Best Coach/Manager – Larry Brown
- Best Comeback – Bethany Hamilton
- Best Breakthrough Athlete – LeBron James
- Best Game – Super Bowl XXXVIII: New England Patriots vs. Carolina Panthers
- Best Record-Breaking Performance – Éric Gagné
- Best Sports Movie – Miracle
- Best Male College Athlete – Emeka Okafor
- Best Female College Athlete – Diana Taurasi
- Best Moment – Brett Favre
- Best Male Action Sports Athlete – Ryan Nyquist
- Best Female Action Sports Athlete – Dallas Friday
- Best Athlete with a Disability – Kyle Maynard
- Best Outdoor Sports Athlete – Tina Bosworth
- Best Play – New Orleans Saints lateral
- Best Upset – Detroit Pistons
- Best Championship Performance – Phil Mickelson

=== Individual categories ===
- Best MLB Player – Barry Bonds
- Best NBA Player – Kevin Garnett
- Best WNBA Player – Lauren Jackson
- Best Bowler – Pete Weber
- Best Boxer – Antonio Tarver
- Best Driver – Dale Earnhardt Jr.
- Best NFL Player – Peyton Manning
- Best Male Golfer – Phil Mickelson
- Best Female Golfer – Annika Sörenstam
- Best NHL Player – Jarome Iginla
- Best Jockey – Stewart Elliott
- Best Male Soccer Player – David Beckham
- Best Female Soccer Player – Mia Hamm
- Best Male Tennis Player – Andy Roddick
- Best Female Tennis Player – Serena Williams
- Best Male Track and Field Athlete – Tom Pappas
- Best Female Track and Field Athlete – Gail Devers

=== Sponsored categories ===
- Under Armour Undeniable Performance Award – Brett Favre
- GMC Professional Grade Award – Steve McNair
