= 2003 ESPY Awards =

Athletic awards show

The 2003 ESPY Awards were hosted by Jamie Foxx on July 16, 2003, at the Dolby Theatre, Los Angeles. The winners in 18 fan-voted categories were selected through online voting at ESPN.com and league sites, while 15 additional categories were determined by the ESPY Select Nominating Committee.

== Winners ==
=== Cross-cutter categories ===
- Best Male Athlete – Lance Armstrong
- Best Female Athlete – Serena Williams
- Best Team – Anaheim Angels
- Best Coach/Manager – Jon Gruden
- Best Game – 2003 Fiesta Bowl: Ohio State vs. Miami
- Best Moment – Pete Sampras winning the US Open
- Best Breakthrough Athlete – Alfonso Soriano
- Best Outdoor Sports Athlete – Jay Yelas
- Best Action Sports Athlete – Shaun White
- Best Athlete with a Disability – Marlon Shirley
- Best Sports Movie – Bend It Like Beckham
- Best Comeback Athlete – Tommy Maddox
- Best Record-Breaking Performance – Emmitt Smith’s NFL rushing record
- Best Male College Athlete – Carmelo Anthony
- Best Female College Athlete – Diana Taurasi

=== Fan-voted categories ===
- Best Play – LSU Hail Mary
- Best NFL Player – Michael Vick
- Best MLB Player – Barry Bonds
- Best NHL Player – Jean-Sébastien Giguère
- Best NBA Player – Tim Duncan
- Best WNBA Player – Lisa Leslie
- Best Driver – Tony Stewart
- Best Bowler – Walter Ray Williams Jr.
- Best Boxer – Roy Jones Jr.
- Best Jockey – José Santos
- Best Male Golfer – Tiger Woods
- Best Female Golfer – Annika Sörenstam
- Best Male Soccer Player – Ronaldo
- Best Female Soccer Player – Katia
- Best Male Tennis Player – Andre Agassi
- Best Female Tennis Player – Serena Williams
- Best Male Track and Field Athlete – Tim Montgomery
- Best Female Track and Field Athlete – Gail Devers
