= 2005 ESPY Awards =

Athletic awards show

The 2005 ESPY Awards (for the Olympic year 2004 and the year 2005) were announced from Kodak Theatre on July 13, 2005 and showed during the telecast on ESPN, July 17, 2005. ESPY Award is short for Excellence in Sports Performance Yearly Award.

The show was hosted by Matthew Perry and had performances from Destiny's Child.

== Winners ==
- Best Female Athlete – Annika Sörenstam, golf
- Best Male Athlete – Lance Armstrong, cycling
- Best Team – Boston Red Sox
- Best Coach/Manager – Bill Belichick, New England Patriots
- Best Game – ALCS Game 5 (Yankees–Red Sox)
- Best Championship Performance – Curt Schilling, Boston Red Sox pitcher
- Best Male Olympic Performance – Michael Phelps, swimming
- Best Female Olympic Performance – Team USA softball
- Best Moment – Reggie Miller's final game
- Best Play – Blake Hoffarber's last second 3-pointer from flat on his back
- Best Upset – Bucknell beats Kansas in NCAA Tournament
- Best Comeback – Mark Fields, Carolina Panthers
- Best Breakthrough – Dwyane Wade, Miami Heat
- Best Record-Breaking Performance – Peyton Manning, Indianapolis Colts
- Best Sports Movie – Friday Night Lights
- Best Male Action Sports Athlete – Dave Mirra, bike stunt
- Best Female Action Sports Athlete – Sofia Mulanovich, surfing
- Best Male College Athlete – Matt Leinart, USC football
- Best Female College Athlete – Cat Osterman, Texas softball
- Best Male Athlete with a Disability – Marlon Shirley, track and field
- Best Female Athlete with a Disability – Erin Popovich, swimming
- Best Outdoor Sports Athlete – J.R. Salzman, lumberjack
- Best Driver – Michael Schumacher
- Best MLB Player – Albert Pujols, St. Louis Cardinals
- Best NBA Player – Steve Nash, Phoenix Suns
- Best WNBA Player – Lauren Jackson, Seattle Storm
- Best Bowler – Walter Ray Williams
- Best Boxer – Bernard Hopkins
- Best NFL Player – Peyton Manning, Indianapolis Colts
- Best Golfer – Tiger Woods
- Best Jockey – Jeremy Rose
- Best Soccer Player – Mia Hamm
- Best Male Tennis Player – Roger Federer
- Best Female Tennis Player – Maria Sharapova

== In memoriam ==
- Ken Caminiti
- Glenn Davis
- Cotton Fitzsimmons
- Clarence Gaines
- Reggie White
