= Best International Athlete ESPY Award =

Annual athletic award

- Awarded for: Best International Athlete
- Location: Los Angeles (2017)
- Presented by: ESPN
- First award: 2006
- Currently held by: (France) Kylian Mbappé (1st award)

Highlights
- Most awards: (Portugal) Cristiano Ronaldo (4 awards)
- Website: www.espn.co.uk/espys/

The Best International Athlete ESPY Award is an award given to the sportsperson adjudged to have been the best or most outstanding of those born outside, or not possessing citizenship, of the United States who contest a major international sport in a given calendar year. From 2008 to 2009, the award was split into Best Female International Athlete ESPY Award and Best Male International Athlete ESPY Award. The women's version of the award for 2008 and 2009 was presented to Mexican professional golfer Lorena Ochoa. The award was discontinued after 2009, but was reinstated in 2012.

In 2018, the award was restricted to soccer and renamed Best International Men's Soccer Player, and a women's version of the award, also specific to soccer, was introduced at that time. Eligibility was still based on citizenship, regardless of the player's club affiliation. The 2018 and 2019 awards for the women's version were given to Australian soccer player Sam Kerr. The award's name was changed again in 2021 to Best International Athlete, Men's Soccer, with the women's award undergoing an identical name change. The eligibility criteria also changed; both awards are now presented to soccer players who play at club level outside the United States, without regard to citizenship. The 2021 women's version of this award, and the first under the current eligibility criteria, was presented to Sam Mewis, an American who played her club soccer at Manchester City.

Balloting for the award was conducted over the Internet by fans from amongst choices selected by the ESPN Select Nominating Committee. The ESPY Awards ceremony has been conducted in June or July since the 2002 ceremony; all awards conferred in that period reflect performance and achievement over the twelve months previous to presentation, which may span one or two seasons depending upon the recipient's particular sport. The award was not awarded in 2020 due to the COVID-19 pandemic.

== List of winners ==
Best International Athlete ESPY Award winners
Year	Image	Sportsperson	Nation of birth	Team	Competition, federation, or league	Sport	Ref
Best International Athlete (2006–2017)
2006	Albert Pujols in 2008	Albert Pujols	Dominican Republic	St. Louis Cardinals	Major League Baseball	Baseball	
2007	Roger Federer in 2007	Roger Federer	Switzerland	—N/a	ATP Tour	Tennis	
2008	Rafael Nadal in 2008	Rafael Nadal	Spain	—N/a	ATP Tour	Tennis	
2009	Usain Bolt in 2009	Usain Bolt	Jamaica	—N/a	—N/a	Athletics	
2012	Lionel Messi in 2012	Lionel Messi	Argentina	FC Barcelona; Argentina	La Liga; FIFA/UEFA/AFA	Football	
2013	Usain Bolt in 2013	Usain Bolt (2)	Jamaica	—N/a	—N/a	Athletics	
2014	Cristiano Ronaldo in 2013	Cristiano Ronaldo	Portugal	Real Madrid; Portugal	La Liga; FIFA/UEFA/FPF	Football	
2015	Lionel Messi in 2015	Lionel Messi (2)	Argentina	FC Barcelona; Argentina	La Liga; FIFA/UEFA/AFA	Football	
2016	Cristiano Ronaldo in 2016	Cristiano Ronaldo (2)	Portugal	Real Madrid; Portugal	La Liga; FIFA/UEFA/FPF	Football	
2017	Usain Bolt in 2017	Usain Bolt (3)	Jamaica	—N/a	—N/a	Athletics	
Best International Men's Soccer Player (2018–2020)
2018	Cristiano Ronaldo in 2016	Cristiano Ronaldo (3)	Portugal	Real Madrid; Portugal	La Liga; FIFA/UEFA/FPF	Football	
2019	Lionel Messi in 2015	Lionel Messi (3)	Argentina	FC Barcelona; Argentina	La Liga; FIFA/UEFA/AFA	Football	
2020	Not awarded due to the COVID-19 pandemic						
Best International Athlete, Men's Soccer (2021–2022)
2021	Cristiano Ronaldo in 2016	Cristiano Ronaldo (4)	Portugal	Juventus; Portugal	Serie A FIFA/UEFA/FPF	Football	
2022	Kylian Mbappé in 2017	Kylian Mbappé	France	Paris Saint-Germain; France	Ligue 1 FIFA/UEFA/FFF	Football	

== See also ==
- AP Athlete of the Year
- United Press International Athlete of the Year Award
