= 2002 ESPY Awards =

Athletic awards show

The 2002 ESPY Awards were hosted by Jamie Foxx on July 10, 2002, at the Dolby Theatre, Los Angeles. Tiger Woods earned three awards; Best Male Athlete, Best Male Golfer, and Best Record-Breaking Performance, bringing his career total to 14.

== Winners ==
=== Cross-cutter categories ===
- Best Male Athlete – Tiger Woods
- Best Female Athlete – Venus Williams
- Best Team – Los Angeles Lakers
- Best Game – 2001 World Series Game 7: New York Yankees vs. Arizona Diamondbacks
- Best Coach/Manager – Phil Jackson
- Best Record-Breaking Performance – Tiger Woods winning a fourth consecutive major championship
- Best Play – Derek Jeter’s shovel throw in Game 3 of the 2001 American League Division Series
- Best Breakthrough Athlete – Tom Brady
- Best Comeback Athlete – Jennifer Capriati
- Best Sports Movie – The Rookie
- Best Moment – Barry Bonds breaking Mark McGwire’s single-season home run record
- Best Outdoor Sports Athlete – Kevin VanDam
- Best Action Sports Athlete – Kelly Clark
- Best Athlete with a Disability – Erik Weihenmayer

=== Individual categories ===
- Best MLB Player – Barry Bonds
- Best NFL Player – Marshall Faulk
- Best NBA Player – Shaquille O’Neal
- Best WNBA Player – Lisa Leslie
- Best NHL Player – Jarome Iginla
- Best U.S. Olympian – Sarah Hughes
- Best Bowler – Pete Weber
- Best Boxer – Lennox Lewis
- Best Male College Athlete – Cael Sanderson
- Best Female College Athlete – Sue Bird
- Best Male Golfer – Tiger Woods
- Best Female Golfer – Annika Sörenstam
- Best Jockey – Victor Espinoza
- Best Male Soccer Player – Landon Donovan
- Best Female Soccer Player – Tiffeny Milbrett
- Best Male Tennis Player – Lleyton Hewitt
- Best Female Tennis Player – Venus Williams
- Best Male Track and Field Athlete – Maurice Greene
- Best Female Track and Field Athlete – Marion Jones

=== Special awards ===
- Arthur Ashe Courage Award – Passengers of United Airlines Flight 93
