= 2014 ESPY Awards =

Athletic awards show

- Date: July 16, 2014
- Location: Dolby Theatre, Los Angeles
- Country: United States
- Hosted by: Drake

Television/radio coverage
- Network: ESPN
- Runtime: 180 minutes

The 2014 ESPY Awards, the 22nd annual ceremony of the ESPY Awards, was held on July 16, 2014, at the Nokia Theatre in Los Angeles, and broadcast by ESPN. The event was hosted by Drake.

== Winners and nominees ==
Best Male Athlete: Kevin Durant – Oklahoma City Thunder, NBA; Miguel Cabrera – Detroit Tigers, MLB; Peyton Manning – Denver Broncos, NFL; Floyd Mayweather – Boxing	Best Female Athlete: Ronda Rousey – UFC; Maya Moore – Minnesota Lynx, WNBA; Mikaela Shiffrin – Alpine skiing; Breanna Stewart – UConn basketball
Best Male Golfer: Bubba Watson; Martin Kaymer; Adam Scott; Henrik Stenson	Best Female Golfer: Michelle Wie; Stacy Lewis; Inbee Park; Suzann Pettersen
Best Male Athlete with a Disability: Declan Farmer – Sled hockey; Mark Bathum – Alpine skiing; Raymond Martin – Wheelchair racing; Mike Shea – Snowboarding; Evan Strong – Snowboarding	Best Female Athlete with a Disability: Jamie Whitmore – Cycling; Minda Dentler – Triathlon; Oksana Masters – Skiing; Tatyana McFadden – Wheelchair racing; Laurie Stephens - Skiing
Best Male Tennis Player: Rafael Nadal; Novak Djokovic; Andy Murray	Best Female Tennis Player: Maria Sharapova; Li Na; Agnieszka Radwańska; Serena Williams
Best Male Action Sports Athlete: Nyjah Huston – Skateboarding; Grant Baker – Surfing; Tucker Hibbert – Snowmobile; Ryan Villopoto – Motocross/Supercross; David Wise - Halfpipe skiing	Best Female Action Sports Athlete: Jamie Anderson – Snowboarding; Maddie Bowman – Freestyle skiing; Kelly Clark – Snowboarding; Vicki Golden – Motocross; Carissa Moore - Surfing
Best Male U.S. Olympian: Sage Kotsenburg – Snowboard slopestyle; Joss Christensen – Freestyle skiing; Ted Ligety – Alpine skiing; Charlie White – Ice dance; David Wise – Freestyle skiing	Best Female U.S. Olympian: Jamie Anderson – Snowboarding; Maddie Bowman – Freestyle skiing; Meryl Davis – Ice dance; Kaitlyn Farrington – Snowboarding; Mikaela Shiffrin - Alpine skiing
Best Male College Athlete: Doug McDermott – Creighton basketball; Johnny Gaudreau – Boston College hockey; David Taylor – Penn State wrestling; Lyle Thompson – Albany lacrosse; Jameis Winston – Florida State football	Best Female College Athlete: Breanna Stewart – UConn basketball; Morgan Brian – Virginia soccer; Taylor Cummings – Maryland lacrosse; Micha Hancock – Penn State volleyball; Hannah Rogers - Florida softball
Best NBA Player: Kevin Durant – Oklahoma City Thunder; Blake Griffin – Los Angeles Clippers; LeBron James – Miami Heat; Joakim Noah – Chicago Bulls	Best WNBA Player: Maya Moore – Minnesota Lynx; Elena Delle Donne – Chicago Sky; Angel McCoughtry – Atlanta Dream; Candace Parker – Los Angeles Sparks
Best International Athlete: Cristiano Ronaldo – Real Madrid, Soccer; Rafael Nadal – Tennis; Inbee Park – Women's golf; Sebastian Vettel – Formula One	Best Comeback Athlete: Russell Westbrook – Oklahoma City Thunder, NBA; Josh Beckett – Los Angeles Dodgers, MLB; Sidney Crosby – Pittsburgh Penguins, NHL; Dominic Moore – New York Rangers, NHL
Best Breakthrough Athlete: Richard Sherman – Seattle Seahawks, NFL; Nick Foles – Philadelphia Eagles, NFL; Damian Lillard – Portland Trail Blazers, NBA; Masahiro Tanaka – New York Yankees, MLB	Best NHL Player: Sidney Crosby – Pittsburgh Penguins; Ryan Getzlaf – Anaheim Ducks; Anže Kopitar – Los Angeles Kings; Henrik Lundqvist – New York Rangers; Jonathan Toews - Chicago Blackhawks
Best NFL Player: Peyton Manning – Denver Broncos; Jamaal Charles – Kansas City Chiefs; Luke Kuechly – Carolina Panthers; LeSean McCoy – Philadelphia Eagles; Russell Wilson – Seattle Seahawks	Best MLS Player: Tim Cahill – New York Red Bulls; Marco Di Vaio – Montreal Impact; Robbie Keane – Los Angeles Galaxy; Mike Magee – Chicago Fire
Best Driver: Ryan Hunter-Reay – IndyCar; Scott Dixon – IndyCar; Dale Earnhardt Jr. – NASCAR; John Force – NHRA; Jimmie Johnson – NASCAR	Best Fighter: Floyd Mayweather – Boxing; Jon Jones – MMA; Manny Pacquiao – Boxing; Ronda Rousey – MMA; Andre Ward - Boxing
Best Bowler: Pete Weber; Jason Belmonte; Wes Malott; Sean Rash	Best Jockey: Victor Espinoza; Javier Castellano; Joel Rosario; Mike Smith
Best Team: Seattle Seahawks – NFL; Boston Red Sox – MLB; Los Angeles Kings – NHL; San Antonio Spurs – NBA; UConn Huskies – Women’s college basketball; Florida State Football – College football	Best Upset: Mercer beats Duke – NCAA Division I men's basketball tournament; UConn wins NCAA title – NCAA Division I men's basketball tournament; Chris Weidman over Anderson Silva – UFC 162
Best Coach/Manager: Gregg Popovich – San Antonio Spurs, NBA; Geno Auriemma – UConn Huskies, Women’s college basketball; Pete Carroll – Seattle Seahawks, NFL; John Farrell – Boston Red Sox, MLB; Kevin Ollie – UConn Huskies, Men’s college basketball	Best Championship Performance: Kawhi Leonard – San Antonio Spurs, NBA; Jimmie Johnson – NASCAR; Shabazz Napier – UConn Huskies, Men's college basketball; David Ortiz – Boston Red Sox, MLB
Best Game: Auburn vs. Alabama – Iron Bowl; Colts vs. Chiefs – AFC wildcard playoff; Rangers vs. Kings – Stanley Cup Final Game 5	Best MLB Player: Miguel Cabrera – Detroit Tigers; Chris Davis – Baltimore Orioles; Clayton Kershaw – Los Angeles Dodgers; Max Scherzer – Detroit Tigers; Mike Trout - Los Angeles Angels
Best Play: Kick Six –Chris Davis of Auburn returns a missed Alabama field goal to win the 2013 Iron Bowl	Best Moment: The U.S. men's national soccer team defeats Ghana 2–1 in its opening game of the 2014 FIFA World Cup

== Honorary awards ==
Jimmy V Award

- Stuart Scott

Arthur Ashe Courage Award

- Michael Sam

Pat Tillman Award for Service

- Joshua Sweeney

== In Memoriam ==
- Tony Gwynn
- Bum Phillips
- Tom Gola
- Ken Norton
- Walt Bellamy
- L. C. Greenwood
- Jim Fregosi
- Earl Morrall
- Chuck Noll
- Don Meyer
- Rubin Carter
- Ralph Wilson
- Bob Welch
- Emile Griffith
- Bud Adams
- Tommy Morrison
- Todd Christensen
- Don Zimmer
- Don James
- Louis Zamperini
- Art Donovan
- Ralph Kiner
- Jack Ramsay
- Jack Brabham
- Eusébio
- Alfredo Di Stéfano
