= 2022 ESPY Awards =

Athletic awards show

- Date: July 20, 2022
- Location: Dolby Theatre, Los Angeles
- Country: United States
- Hosted by: Stephen Curry

Television/radio coverage
- Network: ABC
- Runtime: 180 minutes

The 2022 ESPY Awards was the 30th annual ceremony of the ESPY Award, held on July 20, 2022, at the Dolby Theatre in Los Angeles, and broadcast on ABC. NBA player Stephen Curry served as the host.

== Winners and nominees ==
Best Athlete, Men's Sports: Shohei Ohtani – Los Angeles Angels, MLB; Stephen Curry – Golden State Warriors, NBA; Connor McDavid – Edmonton Oilers, NHL; Aaron Rodgers – Green Bay Packers, NFL	Best Athlete, Women's Sports: Katie Ledecky – Swimming; Sunisa Lee – Gymnastics; Oksana Masters – Cross country skiing, biathlon; Candace Parker – Chicago Sky, WNBA
Best Breakthrough Athlete: Eileen Gu – Skiing; Ja Morant – Memphis Grizzlies, NBA; Trinity Rodman – Washington Spirit, NWSL; Jonathan Taylor – Indianapolis Colts, NFL	Best Comeback Athlete: Klay Thompson – Golden State Warriors, NBA; Joe Burrow – Cincinnati Bengals, NFL; Diamond DeShields – Phoenix Mercury, WNBA; Trey Mancini – Baltimore Orioles, MLB
Best Olympian, Men's Sports: Caeleb Dressel – Swimming; Nathan Chen – Figure skating; Declan Farmer – Sled hockey; Nick Mayhugh – Track and field	Best Olympian, Women's Sports: Katie Ledecky – Swimming; Allyson Felix – Track and field; Sunisa Lee – Gymnastics; Oksana Masters – Cross country skiing, biathlon
Best College Athlete, Men's Sports: Bryce Young – Alabama football; Chet Holmgren – Gonzaga basketball; Dante Polvara – Georgetown soccer; Logan Wisnauskas – Maryland lacrosse	Best College Athlete, Women's Sports: Jocelyn Alo – Oklahoma Sooners softball; Aliyah Boston – South Carolina basketball; Jaelin Howell – Florida State soccer; Charlotte North – Boston College lacrosse
Best Team: Golden State Warriors – NBA; Atlanta Braves – MLB; Chicago Sky – WNBA; Colorado Avalanche – NHL; Georgia Bulldogs football – NCAA Division I FBS; Los Angeles Rams – NFL; Oklahoma Sooners softball – Women's College World Series	Best Championship Performance: Cooper Kupp, Los Angeles Rams – Super Bowl LVI; Julianna Peña – UFC 269; Max Verstappen, Formula One – Abu Dhabi Grand Prix; Cale Makar, Colorado Avalanche – Stanley Cup Finals
Best Game: AFC Divisional Game: Kansas City Chiefs defeat the Buffalo Bills in an OT thriller; Elite 8 NCAA Women's Basketball: UConn defeats NC State in double OT; NCAA Men's Basketball Championship: Kansas' 16-point rally, which was the largest comeback in championship game history; Iron Bowl: Bryce Young rallies Alabama to beat Auburn in four OTs	Best Play: Unbelievable corner kick goal by Megan Rapinoe; Hansel Enmanuel with the play of the year; Ja Morant's Poster; Justin Tucker 66-yard NFL record field goal
Best Record-Breaking Performance: Stephen Curry passes Ray Allen for most 3-pointers made in NBA history; Jocelyn Alo breaks Lauren Chamberlain's home run record for most in Division I history (96); Tom Brady becomes the NFL all-time passing yards leader overtaking Drew Brees; Allyson Felix wins her 11th career medal surpassing Carl Lewis for the United States track and field record	Best NFL Player: Cooper Kupp – Los Angeles Rams; Aaron Rodgers – Green Bay Packers; Jonathan Taylor – Indianapolis Colts; T. J. Watt – Pittsburgh Steelers
Best MLB Player: Shohei Ohtani – Los Angeles Angels; Bryce Harper – Philadelphia Phillies; Aaron Judge – New York Yankees; Jorge Soler – Atlanta Braves	Best NHL Player: Connor McDavid – Edmonton Oilers; Roman Josi – Nashville Predators; Auston Matthews – Toronto Maple Leafs; Igor Shesterkin – New York Rangers
Best NBA Player: Stephen Curry – Golden State Warriors; Luka Dončić – Dallas Mavericks; Joel Embiid – Philadelphia 76ers; Nikola Jokić – Denver Nuggets	Best WNBA Player: Candace Parker – Los Angeles Sparks, Chicago Sky; Skylar Diggins-Smith – Phoenix Mercury; Sylvia Fowles – Minnesota Lynx; Jonquel Jones – Connecticut Sun
Best MLS Player: Carlos Vela – Los Angeles FC; Valentín Castellanos – NYCFC; Jesús Ferreira – FC Dallas; Carles Gil – New England Revolution	Best NWSL Player: Ashley Hatch – Washington Spirit; Aubrey Bledsoe – Washington Spirit; Jess Fishlock – OL Reign; Caprice Dydasco – NJ/NY Gotham FC
Best International Athlete, Men's Soccer: Kylian Mbappé – Paris Saint-Germain; Karim Benzema – Real Madrid; Kevin De Bruyne – Manchester City; Sadio Mané – Liverpool	Best International Athlete, Women's Soccer: Sam Kerr – Chelsea; Caroline Graham Hansen – Barcelona; Vivianne Miedema – Arsenal; Alexia Putellas – Barcelona
Best Driver: Kyle Larson, NASCAR; Álex Palou, IndyCar; Steve Torrence, NHRA; Max Verstappen – Formula One	Best Jockey: José Ortiz; Joel Rosario; Irad Ortiz; Flavien Prat
Best Male Golfer: Justin Thomas; Jon Rahm; Scottie Scheffler; Cameron Smith	Best Female Golfer: Nelly Korda; Ko Jin-young; Lydia Ko; Minjee Lee
Best Boxer: Tyson Fury; Shakur Stevenson; Katie Taylor; Mikaela Mayer	Best MMA Fighter: Charles Oliveira; Kayla Harrison; Kamaru Usman; Alexander Volkanovski
Best Male Action Sports Athlete: Eli Tomac – Supercross; Alex Hall – Skiing; Yuto Horigome – Skateboarding; Ayumu Hirano – Snowboarding	Best Female Action Sports Athlete: Eileen Gu – Skiing; Chloe Kim – Snowboarding; Rayssa Leal, Skateboarding; Zoi Sadowski-Synnott – Snowboarding
Best Athlete, Men's Tennis: Rafael Nadal; Carlos Alcaraz; Dylan Alcott; Félix Auger-Aliassime	Best Athlete, Women's Tennis: Emma Raducanu; Ashleigh Barty; Iga Świątek; Leylah Fernandez
Best Male Athlete with a Disability: Brad Snyder – Paratriathlon & swimming; Declan Farmer – Sled hockey; Nick Mayhugh – Track and field; Ian Seidenfeld – Table tennis	Best Female Athlete with a Disability: Jessica Long – Swimming; Oksana Masters – Cycling & Nordic/Biathlon; Brenna Huckaby – Snowboarding; Kate Ward – Soccer
Best Bowler: Kyle Troup; Dom Barrett; Jason Belmonte; Anthony Simonsen	Best WWE Moment: Cody Rhodes' return to WWE at WrestleMania 38

== Honorary awards ==
Jimmy V Award

- Dick Vitale

Arthur Ashe Courage Award

- Vitali Klitschko

Muhammad Ali Sports Humanitarian Award

- Albert Pujols

Pat Tillman Award for Service

- Gretchen Evans

Sports Humanitarian Team of the Year

- Denver Broncos

== Tribute ==
In order to celebrate the 50th anniversary of Title IX going into effect, country music singer Mickey Guyton performed "What Are You Gonna Tell Her?" and "Remember Her Name" interspersed with short speeches from female athletes including Billie Jean King, Lisa Leslie, Brandi Chastain, Carolyn Peck, Jocelyn Alo, Layshia Clarendon, Chloe Kim, Oksana Masters, Allyson Felix, Aly Raisman and Megan Rapinoe discussing the progress that still has to be made for women in sports.
