= 2024 ESPY Awards =

Athletic awards show

- Date: July 11, 2024
- Location: Dolby Theatre, Los Angeles
- Country: United States
- Hosted by: Serena Williams

Television/radio coverage
- Network: ABC
- Runtime: 180 minutes

The 2024 ESPY Awards, the 32nd annual ceremony of the ESPY Awards, was held on July 11, 2024, at the Dolby Theatre in Los Angeles, and broadcast by ABC.

== Ceremony ==
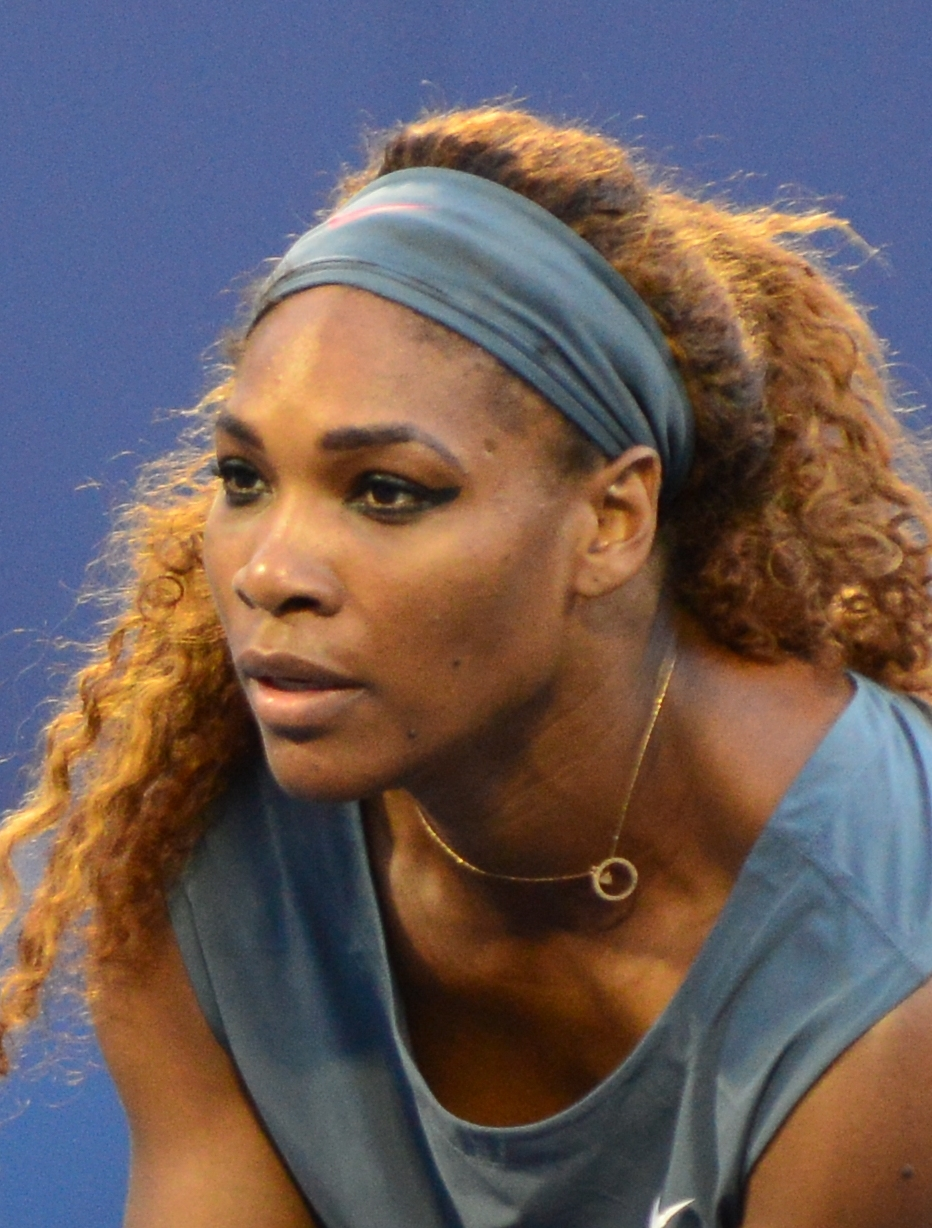
Serena Williams was the first African American female athlete to host the ceremony

On May 14, 2024, it was announced that tennis player Serena Williams would host the ceremony, becoming the fourth woman to host the ESPY awards, following Danica Patrick, Megan Rapinoe and Sue Bird, as well as the first African American female athlete to host. The nominees were announced on June 26, 2024. Prince Harry, Duke of Sussex was the recipient of the Pat Tillman Award in recognition of his service in the British Armed Forces and work with the Invictus Games.

== Nominees ==
| Best Athlete, Men's Sports: Patrick Mahomes – Kansas City Chiefs, NFL; Shohei Ohtani – Los Angeles Dodgers, MLB; Scottie Scheffler – Golf; Connor McDavid – Edmonton Oilers, NHL | Best Athlete, Women's Sports: A'ja Wilson – Las Vegas Aces, WNBA; Caitlin Clark – Iowa women's basketball; Coco Gauff – Tennis; Nelly Korda – Golf |
| Best Breakthrough Athlete: JuJu Watkins – USC women's basketball; Haleigh Bryant – LSU gymnastics; C. J. Stroud – Houston Texans, NFL; Victor Wembanyama – San Antonio Spurs, NBA | Best Comeback Athlete: Simone Biles – Gymnastics; Paige Bueckers – UConn women's basketball; Joe Flacco – Cleveland Browns, NFL; Zion Williamson – New Orleans Pelicans, NBA |
| Best College Athlete, Men's Sports: Jayden Daniels – LSU football; Ousmane Sylla – Clemson soccer; Pat Kavanagh – Notre Dame lacrosse; Zach Edey – Purdue basketball | Best College Athlete, Women's Sports: Caitlin Clark – Iowa basketball; Sarah Franklin – Wisconsin volleyball; Izzy Scane – Northwestern lacrosse; Haleigh Bryant – LSU gymnastics |
| Best Team: South Carolina Gamecocks – College basketball; Kansas City Chiefs – NFL; Michigan Wolverines – College football; Las Vegas Aces – WNBA; UConn Huskies – College basketball; Oklahoma Sooners – College softball; Boston Celtics – NBA; Florida Panthers – NHL; Texas Rangers – MLB | Best Championship Performance: Jaylen Brown – Boston Celtics; Blake Corum and Will Johnson – Michigan Wolverines, 2024 College Football National Championship MVPs; Kayla Martello – Boston College women's lacrosse; Midge Purce – NJ/NY Gotham FC, NWSL Championship MVP |
| Best Athlete with a Disability: Brenna Huckaby – Snowboarding champion; Jaydin Blackwell – World champion sprinter; Ezra Frech – World champion high jumper; Oksana Masters – Paralympic cross-country skiing / para-cycling | Best Play: Lamar Jackson catches his own pass for first down; Jayda Coleman walk-off home run sends Oklahoma to 4th straight softball championship; Anthony Edwards Dunk of the Year; Alabama scores on 4th and 31 to beat Auburn |
| Best Record-Breaking Performance: Caitlin Clark becomes the NCAA's all-time leading scorer in any sport; 49ers Christian McCaffrey scores a TD for 17 straight games; Tara VanDerveer, Stanford women's basketball – gets 1,203rd win for most by any coach in NCAA basketball history; Max Verstappen wins record 10th consecutive race with victory at the 2023 Italian Grand Prix | Best NFL Player: Patrick Mahomes – Kansas City Chiefs; Myles Garrett – Cleveland Browns; Lamar Jackson – Baltimore Ravens; Christian McCaffrey – San Francisco 49ers |
| Best MLB Player: Shohei Ohtani – Los Angeles Angels; Ronald Acuña – Atlanta Braves; Gerrit Cole – New York Yankees; Corey Seager – Texas Rangers | Best NHL Player: Connor McDavid – Edmonton Oilers; Nikita Kucherov – Tampa Bay Lightning; Nathan MacKinnon – Colorado Avalanche; Auston Matthews – Toronto Maple Leafs |
| Best NBA Player: Luka Dončić – Dallas Mavericks; Nikola Jokić – Denver Nuggets; Shai Gilgeous-Alexander – Oklahoma City Thunder; Jayson Tatum – Boston Celtics | Best WNBA Player: A'ja Wilson – Las Vegas Aces; Napheesa Collier – Minnesota Lynx; Alyssa Thomas – Connecticut Sun; Breanna Stewart – New York Liberty |
| Best Soccer Player: Kylian Mbappé – France / Real Madrid; Aitana Bonmatí – Spain; Naomi Girma – USWNT; Vinicius Junior – Brazil / Real Madrid | Best Driver: Max Verstappen – Formula One; Matt Hagan – NHRA; Ryan Blaney – NASCAR; Álex Palou – IndyCar |
| Best Golfer: Scottie Scheffler; Xander Schauffele; Nelly Korda; Lilia Vu | Best Boxer: Terence Crawford; Seniesa Estrada; Naoya Inoue; Oleksandr Usyk |
| Best UFC Fighter: Sean O’Malley; Alex Pereira; Islam Makhachev; Zhang Weili | Best Tennis Player: Coco Gauff; Novak Djokovic; Carlos Alcaraz; Iga Świątek |

== Honorary awards ==
Jimmy V Award

- Dawn Staley

Arthur Ashe Courage Award

- Steve Gleason

Pat Tillman Award for Service

- Prince Harry, Duke of Sussex

Muhammad Ali Sports Humanitarian Award

- Maui surfing community (Note: Accepted by Kai Lenny and Archie Kalepa)

Sports Humanitarian Team of the Year

- Angel City FC

Icon Award

- Nick Saban

Stuart Scott ENSPIRE Award

- Brice Christianson
