= Best Male Action Sports Athlete ESPY Award =

Annual athletic award

- Awarded for: best male action sports athlete
- Location: Various
- Presented by: ESPN
- First award: 2004
- Currently held by: Eli Tomac (USA)
- Website: www.espn.co.uk/espys/

The Best Male Action Sports Athlete ESPY Award is an annual award honoring the achievements of a male athlete from the world of action sports. It was first awarded as part of the ESPY Awards in 2004 after the non-gender-specific Best Action Sports Athlete ESPY Award was presented the previous two years (with American snowboarder Shaun White receiving the 2003 award). The Best Male Action Sports Athlete ESPY Award trophy, created by sculptor Lawrence Nowlan, is presented to the male adjudged to be the best action sports athlete in a given calendar year. Balloting for the award is undertaken by fans over the Internet from between three and five choices selected by the ESPN Select Nominating Committee, which is composed of a panel of experts. It is conferred in July to reflect performance and achievement over the preceding twelve months.

The inaugural winner of the Best Male Action Sports Athlete ESPY Award at the 2004 awards was freestyle BMX rider Ryan Nyquist. During 1997 and 2003, Nyquist won eleven out of eighteen available freestyle BMX medals at the X Games. He became the first freestyle BMX rider to be nominated for, and thus the first to win, an ESPY Award. The 2006 winner of the Best Male Action Sports Athlete ESPY Award was Shaun White. He was nominated a further five consecutive times between the 2008 and 2012 ceremonies, all of which he won, making him the athlete with the most victories with six. The two other athletes to have earned successive awards are street skateboarder Nyjah Huston and motocross rider Ryan Dungey. Canadian snowboarder Mark McMorris became the first non-American to win the accolade in 2017 by earning three medals at that year's X Games in Minneapolis. Snowboarders are the most successful sportspeople with seven awards, followed by motocross riders, with four, and street skateboarders, with three. It was not awarded in 2020 due to the COVID-19 pandemic. The most recent winner of the award was American Motocross and Supercross racer Eli Tomac in 2022.

== Winners and nominees ==
Best Male Action Sports Athlete ESPY Award winners and nominees
Year	Image	Athlete	Nationality	Sport(s) regularly contested	Nominees	Refs
2004	–	Ryan Nyquist	United States	Freestyle BMX (park and dirt jumping)	Brian Deegan (USA) – Freestyle motocross Bucky Lasek (USA) – Skateboarding; Chad Reed (AUS) – Motocross/Supercross	
2005	Dave Mirra at a rallying event in 2010	Dave Mirra	United States	Freestyle BMX (street, park, and vert)	Ricky Carmichael (USA) – Motocross; Andy Irons (USA) – Surfing; Bucky Lasek (USA) – Skateboarding	
2006	Shaun White at a public event in 2008	Shaun White	United States	Snowboarding (half-pipe)	Jamie Bestwick (GBR) – BMX; Ricky Carmichael (USA) – Motocross; Kelly Slater (USA) – Surfing; Jeremy Stenberg (USA) – Freestyle motocross	
2007	Travis Pastrana in rallying overalls in 2009	Travis Pastrana	United States	Motocross/rallying	Ricky Carmichael (USA) – Motocross; Kelly Slater (USA) – Surfing; Danny Way (USA) – Skateboarding; Andreas Wiig (NOR) – Snowboarding	
2008	Shaun White at a public appearance in 2007	Shaun White	United States	Snowboarding (half-pipe, slopestyle), Skateboarding (vert)	Kevin Pearce (USA) – Snowboarding; Chad Reed (AUS) – Supercross; Kevin Robinson (USA) – BMX	
2009	Shaun White at a public event in 2009	Shaun White	United States	Snowboarding (half-pipe, slopestyle), Skateboarding (vert)	Ryan Sheckler (USA) – Skateboarding; Kelly Slater (USA) – Surfing; James Stewart Jr. (USA) – Motocross	
2010		Shaun White	United States	Snowboarding (half-pipe, slopestyle), Skateboarding (vert)	Bobby Brown (USA) – Freeriding; Ryan Dungey (USA) – Motocross; Mick Fanning (AUS) – Surfing; Garrett Reynolds (USA) – Freestyle BMX	
2011	Shaun White holding a metal bar in 2011	Shaun White	United States	Snowboarding (half-pipe, slopestyle), Skateboarding (vert)	Tucker Hibbert (USA) – Snowmobiling; Travis Pastrana (USA) – Motocross; Kevin Rolland (FRA) – Freestyle skiing Kelly Slater (USA) – Surfing	
2012	Shaun White celebrating victory at the 2018 Winter Olympics	Shaun White	United States	Snowboarding (half-pipe, slopestyle), Skateboarding (vert)	Travis Rice (USA) – Snowboarding; Kelly Slater (USA) – Surfing; Ryan Villopoto (USA) – Motocross	
2013	Nyjah Huston at the KDC 2015 Street World Championships	Nyjah Huston	United States	Street skateboarding	Pedro Barros (BRA) – Skateboarding; Mark McMorris (CAN) – Snowboarding; Ryan Villopoto (USA) – Motocross	
2014	–	Nyjah Huston	United States	Street skateboarding	Grant Baker (RSA) – Surfing; Tucker Hibbert (USA) – Snowmobiling; Ryan Villopoto (USA) – Motocross; David Wise (USA) – Freestyle skiing	
2015	–	Ryan Dungey	United States	Motocross	Tucker Hibbert (USA) – Snowmobiling; Nyjah Huston (USA) – Street skateboarding Mark McMorris (CAN) – Snowboarding; Josh Sheehan (AUS) – Freestyle motocross	
2016	–	Ryan Dungey	United States	Motocross	Pedro Barros (BRA) – Skateboarding; Nyjah Huston (USA) – Skateboarding; Gus Kenworthy (USA) – Freestyle skiing Mark McMorris (CAN) – Snowboarding	
2017	A landscape photographic portrait of Mark McMorris taken in 2016	Mark McMorris	Canada	Snowboarding	Øystein Bråten (NOR) – Freestyle skiing John John Florence (USA) – Surfing; Nyjah Huston (USA) – Skateboarding	
2018	–	David Wise	United States	Freestyle skier	Henrik Harlaut (SWE) – Freestyle skiing Kelvin Hoefler (BRA) – Skateboarding; Marcus Kleveland (NOR) – Snowboarding	
2019	–	Nyjah Huston	United States	Street skateboarding	Scotty James (AUS) – Snowboarding; Gabriel Medina (BRA) – Surfing; Tom Pagès (FRA) – Freestyle motocross	
2020	Not awarded due to the COVID-19 pandemic					
2021	A man wearing a white shirt looks to the left of the camera.	Gabriel Medina	Brazil	Surfing	Marcus Kleveland (NOR) – Snowboarding; Yūto Totsuka (JPN) – Snowboarding; Cooper Webb (USA) – Motocross/Supercross	
2022	A man wearing a black and green baseball is alongside a rider wearing a crash helmet to his right and a man wearing sunglasses to his left	Eli Tomac	United States	Motocross/Supercross	Alex Hall (USA) – Skiing; Yuto Horigome (JPN) – Skateboarding; Ayumu Hirano (JPN) – Snowboarding	

== See also ==
- Best Female Action Sports Athlete ESPY Award
- Laureus World Sports Award for Action Sportsperson of the Year
