= Best Male Athlete ESPY Award =

Annual athletic award

- Awarded for: Best male athlete
- Location: Los Angeles, California, U.S.
- Presented by: ESPN
- First award: 1993
- Currently held by: Jalen Brunson
- Website: espn.co.uk/espys

The Best Male Athlete ESPY Award, known alternatively as the Outstanding Male Athlete ESPY Award, is an annual award honoring the achievements of individual men from the world of sports. It has been presented annually at the ESPY Awards (Excellence in Sports Performance Yearly Award) since 1993 to the male voted irrespective of nationality or sport contested, adjudged to be the best athlete in a given calendar year. The Best Male Athlete ESPY Award trophy, designed by sculptor Lawrence Nowlan, is presented to the recipient at an annual ceremony in Los Angeles. Since 2004, the winner has been chosen by online balloting through three to five choices selected by the ESPN Select Nominating Committee. Before that, determination of the winners was made by an panel of experts. Through the 2001 iteration of the ESPY Awards, ceremonies were conducted in February of each year to honor achievements over the previous calendar year; awards presented thereafter are conferred in July and reflect performance from the June previous. (Note: Because of the rescheduling of the ESPY Awards ceremony, the award presented in 2002 was given in consideration of performance betwixt February 2001 and June 2002.)

The inaugural winner of the Best Male Athlete ESPY Award was basketball player Michael Jordan in 1993. Four American athletes, golfer Tiger Woods, road cyclist Lance Armstrong, basketball player LeBron James, and American football player Patrick Mahomes have won the award multiple times. Woods was honored five times: in 1998 (jointly with baseball player Ken Griffey Jr.), 2000, 2001, 2002 and 2008. Armstrong was honored four times from 2003 to 2006 inclusive. James received the award on three occasions in 2012, 2013 and 2016. Mahomes received the award twice in 2023 and 2024. Basketball is the most successful sport, its players having received a total of nine awards and thirty-three nominations since its inception, followed by American football players with six wins and twenty-seven nominations. The award has been won by a non-American five times – in 2011 by German basketball player Dirk Nowitzki, in 2018 by Russian hockey player Alex Ovechkin, in 2019 by Greek basketball player Giannis Antetokounmpo, in 2022 by Japanese baseball player Shohei Ohtani, and in 2025 by Canadian basketball player Gilgeous-Alexander. All five were playing for American teams. It was not awarded in 2020 due to the COVID-19 pandemic.

== Winners and nominees ==
Winners and nominees of the Best Male Athlete ESPY Award
Year	Image	Athlete	Nation	Sport	Nominees	Ref(s)
1993		Michael Jordan	USA	Basketball	Dennis Eckersley (USA) – Baseball; Mario Lemieux (CAN) – Ice hockey Emmitt Smith (USA) – American football Steve Young (USA) – American football	
1994	Barry Bonds in 1993	Barry Bonds	USA	Baseball	Charles Barkley (USA) – Basketball; Mario Lemieux (CAN) – Ice hockey Nigel Mansell (GBR) – Motorsport; Charlie Ward (USA) – College football	
1995	Steve Young in 1990	Steve Young	USA	American football	George Foreman (USA) – Boxing; Hakeem Olajuwon (USA) – Basketball; Barry Sanders (USA) – American football	
1996	Cal Ripkin Jr. in 1996	Cal Ripken Jr.	USA	Baseball	Greg Maddux (USA) – Baseball; Hakeem Olajuwon (USA) – Basketball	
1997	Michael Johnson in 1995	Michael Johnson	USA	Track and field	Michael Jordan (USA) – Basketball; Tiger Woods (USA) – Golf	
1998	Tiger Woods in 1997	Tiger Woods	USA	Golf	Michael Jordan (USA) – Basketball; Barry Sanders (USA) – American football	
1998	Ken Griffey Jr. in 1997	Ken Griffey Jr.	USA	Baseball	Michael Jordan (USA) – Basketball; Barry Sanders (USA) – American football	
1999	Mark McGwire in 1989	Mark McGwire	USA	Baseball	Terrell Davis (USA) – American football Jeff Gordon (USA) – NASCAR; Michael Jordan (USA) – Basketball; Sammy Sosa (DOM) – Baseball	
2000	Tiger Woods in 2000	Tiger Woods (2)	USA	Golf	Tim Duncan (USA) – Basketball; Pedro Martínez (DOM) – Baseball	
2001	Tiger Woods in 2004	Tiger Woods (3)	USA	Golf	Lance Armstrong USA) – Road cycling Shaquille O'Neal (USA) – Basketball	
2002	Tiger Woods in 2007	Tiger Woods (4)	USA	Golf	Lance Armstrong (USA) – Road cycling Barry Bonds (USA) – Baseball; Shaquille O'Neal (USA) – Basketball; Cael Sanderson (USA) – Collegiate wrestling	
2003	Lance Armstrong in 2003	Lance Armstrong	USA	Road cycling	Barry Bonds (USA) – Baseball; Tim Duncan (USA) – Basketball; Tiger Woods (USA) – Golf	
2004	Lance Armstrong in 2004	Lance Armstrong (2)	USA	Road cycling	Barry Bonds (USA) – Baseball; Tom Brady (USA) – American football Kevin Garnett (USA) – Basketball; Peyton Manning (USA) – American football	
2005	Lance Armstrong in 2005	Lance Armstrong (3)	USA	Road cycling	Peyton Manning (USA) – American football Bode Miller (USA) – Skiing; Michael Phelps (USA) – Swimming; Vijay Singh (FIJ) – Golf	
2006	Lance Armstrong in 2008	Lance Armstrong (4)	USA	Road cycling	Shaun Alexander (USA) – American football LeBron James (USA) – Basketball; Albert Pujols (DOM) – Baseball; Vince Young (USA) – College football	
2007	LaDainian Tomlinson in 2008	LaDainian Tomlinson	USA	American football	Roger Federer (SUI) – Tennis; LeBron James (USA) – Basketball; Peyton Manning (USA) – American football Tiger Woods (USA) – Golf	
2008	Tiger Woods in 2008	Tiger Woods (5)	USA	Golf	Tom Brady (USA) – American football Kobe Bryant (USA) – Basketball; Alex Rodriguez (USA) – Baseball	
2009	Michael Phelps in 2009	Michael Phelps	USA	Swimming	Kobe Bryant (USA) – Basketball; LeBron James (USA) – Basketball; Jimmie Johnson (USA) – NASCAR	
2010	Drew Brees in 2010	Drew Brees	USA	American football	Kobe Bryant (USA) – Basketball; LeBron James (USA) – Basketball; Jimmie Johnson (USA) – NASCAR; Albert Pujols (DOM) – Baseball	
2011	Dirk Nowitzki in 2009	Dirk Nowitzki	DEU	Basketball	Jimmie Johnson (USA) – NASCAR; Rafael Nadal (ESP) – Tennis; Aaron Rodgers (USA) – American football	
2012	LeBron James in 2012	LeBron James	USA	Basketball	Novak Djokovic (SER) – Tennis; Aaron Rodgers (USA) – American football Justin Verlander (USA) – Baseball	
2013	LeBron James in 2013	LeBron James (2)	USA	Basketball	Miguel Cabrera (VEN) – Baseball; Adrian Peterson (USA) – American football Michael Phelps (USA) – Swimming	
2014	Kevin Durant in 2014	Kevin Durant	USA	Basketball	Miguel Cabrera (VEN) – Baseball; Peyton Manning (USA) – American football Floyd Mayweather Jr. (USA) – Boxing	
2015	Stephen Curry in 2016	Stephen Curry	USA	Basketball	LeBron James (USA) – Basketball; Aaron Rodgers (USA) – American football J. J. Watt (USA) – American football	
2016	LeBron James in 2014	LeBron James (3)	USA	Basketball	Stephen Curry (USA) – Basketball; Bryce Harper (USA) – Baseball; Cam Newton (USA) – American football	
2017	Russell Westbrook in 2015	Russell Westbrook	USA	Basketball	Kris Bryant (USA) – Baseball; Sidney Crosby (CAN) – Ice hockey Michael Phelps (USA) – Swimming	
2018		Alexander Ovechkin	RUS	Ice hockey	Jose Altuve (VEN) – Baseball; Tom Brady (USA) – American football James Harden (USA) – Basketball	
2019		Giannis Antetokounmpo	GRE	Basketball	Mookie Betts (USA) – Baseball; Brooks Koepka (USA) – Golf; Patrick Mahomes (USA) – American football	
2020	Not awarded due to the COVID-19 pandemic					
2021		Tom Brady	USA	American football	Lewis Hamilton (GBR) – Formula One; Nikola Jokić (SER) – Basketball; Connor McDavid (CAN) – Ice hockey	
2022		Shohei Ohtani	JPN	Baseball	Stephen Curry (USA) – Basketball; Connor McDavid (CAN) – Ice hockey Aaron Rodgers (USA) – American football	
2023		Patrick Mahomes	USA	American football	Nikola Jokić (SER) – Basketball; Aaron Judge (USA) – Baseball; Lionel Messi (ARG) – Soccer	
2024		Patrick Mahomes (2)	USA	American football	Connor McDavid (CAN) – Ice hockey Shohei Ohtani (JPN) – Baseball; Scottie Scheffler (USA) – Golf	
2025		Shai Gilgeous-Alexander	CAN	Basketball	Josh Allen (USA) – American football Shohei Ohtani (JPN) – Baseball; Saquon Barkley (USA) – American football	
2026	Jalen Brunson, guard with the New York Knicks during a game against the Cleveland Cavs on April 26, 2023.	Jalen Brunson	USA	Basketball	Matthew Stafford (USA) – American football Shohei Ohtani (JPN) – Baseball; Lionel Messi (ARG) – Soccer	

== Statistics ==
Multiple winners and nominees
Name	Wins	Nominations
Tiger Woods	5	8
Lance Armstrong	4	6
LeBron James	3	8
Patrick Mahomes	2	3
Barry Bonds	1	4
Tom Brady	1	4
Michael Jordan	1	4
Shohei Ohtani	1	4
Michael Phelps	1	4
Stephen Curry	1	3
Steve Young	1	2
Giannis Antetokounmpo	1	1
Drew Brees	1	1
Jalen Brunson	1	1
Kevin Durant	1	1
Ken Griffey Jr.	1	1
Michael Johnson	1	1
Mark McGwire	1	1
Dirk Nowitzki	1	1
Alexander Ovechkin	1	1
Cal Ripken Jr.	1	1
LaDainian Tomlinson	1	1
Russell Westbrook	1	1
Peyton Manning	0	4
Aaron Rodgers	0	4
Kobe Bryant	0	3
Jimmie Johnson	0	3
Connor McDavid	0	3
Miguel Cabrera	0	2
Tim Duncan	0	2
Nikola Jokić	0	2
Mario Lemieux	0	2
Lionel Messi	0	2
Hakeem Olajuwon	0	2
Shaquille O'Neal	0	2
Albert Pujols	0	2
Barry Sanders	0	2

Winners by nationality
Country	Winners	Nominations
USA	29	80
DEU	1	1
GRE	1	1
RUS	1	1
JPN	1	4
CAN	1	7
DOM	0	4
VEN	0	3
SER	0	3
ARG	0	2
ESP	0	1
GBR	0	1
FIJ	0	1
SUI	0	1

Winners by sport
Sport	Winners	Nominations
Basketball	11	35
American football	6	30
Baseball	5	26
Golf	5	11
Road cycling	4	6
Ice hockey	1	7
Swimming	1	4
Track and field	1	1
NASCAR	0	4
Tennis	0	3
Boxing	0	2
College football	0	2
Soccer	0	2
Collegiate wrestling	0	1
Formula One	0	1
Motorsport	0	1
Skiing	0	1

== See also ==
- Best Female Athlete ESPY Award
- Best International Athlete ESPY Award
