= Best U.S. Male Olympian ESPY Award =

Annual athletic award

The Best Olympian, Men's Sports ESPY Award formerly known as the Best U.S. Male Olympian ESPY Award has been presented annually since 2009 to the sportsman or team affiliated with the United States Olympic Committee and contesting sport internationally adjudged to be the best. The award serves in practice to replace the Best Male Olympic Performance ESPY Award, which was presented in 2005, and the Best U.S. Olympian ESPY Award presented in 2006.

Balloting for the award is undertaken by fans over the Internet from amongst between three and five choices selected by the ESPN Select Nominating Committee, and the award is conferred in June to reflect performance and achievement over the twelve months previous.

== List of winners ==
| Year | Athlete | Sport contested | Other nominees |
|---|---|---|---|
| 2009 | Michael Phelps | Swimming | Bryan Clay (Track and field); LaShawn Merritt (Track and field); Angelo Taylor (Track and field) |
| 2010 | Shaun White | Snowboarding | Apolo Anton Ohno (Speedskating); Shani Davis (Speedskating); Evan Lysacek (Figure Skating); Bode Miller (Skiing) |
| 2011 | No award presented | | |
| 2012 | No award presented | | |
| 2013 | Michael Phelps | Swimming | Ashton Eaton (Decathlon); Ryan Lochte (Swimming) |
| 2014 | Sage Kotsenburg | Snowboarding | Joss Christensen (Freestyle skiing); Ted Ligety (Alpine skiing); Charlie White (Ice dancing); David Wise (Half-pipe skiing) |
| 2015 | No award presented | | |
| 2016 | No award presented | | |
| 2017 | Michael Phelps | Swimming | Ashton Eaton (Decathlon); Ryan Murphy (Swimming); Kyle Snyder (Wrestling) |
| 2018 | Shaun White | Snowboarding | Red Gerard (Snowboarding); David Wise (Skiing); John Shuster (Curling) |
| 2019 | No award presented | | |
| 2020 | No award presented | | |
| 2021 | No award presented | | |
| 2022 | Caeleb Dressel | Swimming | Nathan Chen (Figure skating); Declan Farmer (Sledge hockey); Nick Mayhugh (Track and field) |

== See also ==
- USOC Team of the Year Award
- United States at the Olympics
- United States Olympic Hall of Fame
- Best U.S. Female Olympian ESPY Award
