= Best U.S. Female Olympian ESPY Award =

Annual athletic award

The Best Olympian, Women's Sports ESPY Award formerly known as the Best U.S. Female Olympian ESPY Award has been presented annually since 2009 to the sportswoman or team affiliated with the United States Olympic Committee and contesting sport internationally adjudged to be the best. The award serves in practice to replace the Best Female Olympic Performance ESPY Award, which was presented in 2005, and the Best U.S. Olympian ESPY Award presented in 2006.

Balloting for the award is undertaken by fans over the Internet from amongst between three and five choices selected by the ESPN Select Nominating Committee, and the award is conferred in June to reflect performance and achievement over the twelve months previous.

== List of winners ==
Year	Athlete	Sport contested	Other nominees
2009	Shawn Johnson	Gymnastics	Natalie Coughlin (Swimming); Dawn Harper (Track and field); Nastia Liukin (Gymnastics)
2010	Lindsey Vonn	Downhill skiing	Hannah Kearney (Skiing); Julia Mancuso (Skiing)
2011	No award presented		
2012	No award presented		
2013	Missy Franklin	Swimming	Gabby Douglas (Gymnastics); Aly Raisman (Gymnastics)
2014	Jamie Anderson	Snowboarding	Maddie Bowman (Half-pipe skiing); Meryl Davis (Ice dancing); Kaitlyn Farrington (Snowboarding); Mikaela Shiffrin (Alpine skiing)
2015	No award presented		
2016	No award presented		
2017	Simone Biles	Gymnastics	Allyson Felix (Track and field); Katie Ledecky (Swimming); Simone Manuel (Swimming)
2018	Chloe Kim	Snowboarding	Mikaela Shiffrin (Skiing); Jamie Anderson (Snowboarding); Jocelyne Lamoureux (Ice hockey)
2019	No award presented		
2020	No award presented		
2021	No award presented		
2022	Katie Ledecky	Swimming	Allyson Felix (Track and field); Sunisa Lee (Gymnastics); Oksana Masters (Cross country skiing)

== See also ==
- List of sports awards honoring women
- USOC Athlete of the Year
- United States at the Olympics
- United States Olympic & Paralympic Hall of Fame
- Best U.S. Male Olympian ESPY Award
