= Best MLS Player ESPY Award =

Annual athletic award

- Awarded for: best MLS player
- Country: United States
- Presented by: ESPN
- First award: 2006
- Currently held by: Carlos Vela (MEX)

Highlights
- Most awards: Landon Donovan (5 times)
- Website: www.espn.co.uk/espys/

The Best MLS Player ESPY Award is an annual award honoring the achievements of an individual from the world of Major League Soccer (MLS). It was first awarded as part of the ESPY Awards in 2006. The Best MLS Player ESPY Award trophy, designed by sculptor Lawrence Nowlan, is presented to the MLS player adjudged to be the best in a given calendar year at the annual ESPY Awards ceremony in Los Angeles. Balloting for the award is undertaken by fans over the Internet from between three and five nominees selected by the ESPN Select Nominating Committee, which is composed by a panel of experts. It is conferred in July to reflect performance and achievement over the preceding twelve months, which generally includes a portion of each of two MLS seasons.

The inaugural winner of the Best MLS Player ESPY Award was LA Galaxy forward Landon Donovan in 2006. He is one of two people to have been presented with the award more than once in its history, winning it a further four times in 2007, 2009, 2010 and 2011; he also earned a nomination in 2008. English right midfielder David Beckham, also for LA Galaxy, has been the second most successful player, winning twice in 2008 and 2012. American players have been the most successful with five wins and twenty-eight nominations, while those who play in the position of a forward have been recognized on fourteen occasions, and those who have played for LA Galaxy have won a total of nine awards. It was not awarded in 2020 due to the COVID-19 pandemic. The most recent winner of the award was Carlos Vela of Los Angeles FC in 2022.

== Winners and nominees ==
Key
*	Player's team won the MLS Cup
†	Player's team lost the MLS Cup
‡	MLS Cup Most Valuable Player

Best MLS Player ESPY Award winners and nominees
Year	Image	Player	Nation	Team	Position	Other nominees	Ref(s)
2006	Landon Donovan at the 2004 MLS All-Star Game	Landon Donovan	USA	LA Galaxy	Forward	Dwayne De Rosario (CAN) – San Jose Earthquakes; Jaime Moreno (BOL) – D.C. United; Taylor Twellman (USA) – New England Revolution	
2007	Landon Donovan practicing in 2006	Landon Donovan (2)	USA	LA Galaxy	Forward	Jeff Cunningham (USA) – Toronto FC; Christian Gómez (ARG) – D.C. United; Matt Reis (USA) – New England Revolution	
2008	David Beckham playing for LA Galaxy in 2008	David Beckham	ENG	LA Galaxy	Right midfielder	Juan Pablo Ángel (COL) – New York Red Bulls; Cuauhtémoc Blanco (MEX) – Chicago Fire; Landon Donovan (USA) – LA Galaxy; Luciano Emílio (BRA) – D.C. United	
2009	Landon Donovan warming up for a soccer game in 2014	Landon Donovan (3)	USA	LA Galaxy	Forward	Juan Pablo Ángel (COL) – New York Red Bulls; Jon Busch (USA) – Chicago Fire; Kenny Cooper (USA) – FC Dallas; Guillermo Barros Schelotto (ARG) – Columbus Crew	
2010	Landon Donovan playing in a soccer game in 2010	Landon Donovan (4)†	USA	LA Galaxy	Forward	Conor Casey (USA) – Colorado Rapids; Jeff Cunningham (USA) – FC Dallas; Shalrie Joseph (GRD) – New England Revolution; Kasey Keller (USA) – Seattle Sounders FC	
2011	Landon Donovan holding a soccer ball in 2011 game	Landon Donovan (5)*‡	USA	LA Galaxy	Forward	Edson Buddle (USA) – LA Galaxy; David Ferreira (COL) – FC Dallas; Chris Wondolowski (USA) – San Jose Earthquakes	
2012	David Beckham at a visit of the United States Embassy in London in 2012	David Beckham (2)	ENG	LA Galaxy	Right midfielder	Dwayne De Rosario (CAN) – D.C. United; Brad Davis (USA) – Houston Dynamo; Chris Wondolowski (USA) – San Jose Earthquakes	
2013	Thierry Henry with the New York Red Bulls in 2013	Thierry Henry	FRA	New York Red Bulls	Forward	Chris Wondolowski (USA) – San Jose Earthquakes; Graham Zusi (USA) – Sporting Kansas City	
2014	Tim Cahill playing for the New York Red Bulls in 2014	Tim Cahill	AUS	New York Red Bulls	Forward	Marco Di Vaio (ITA) – Montreal Impact; Robbie Keane (IRL) – LA Galaxy; Mike Magee (USA) – Chicago Fire	
2015	Robbie Keane at an international soccer game in 2013	Robbie Keane*‡	IRL	LA Galaxy	Forward	Obafemi Martins (NGA) – Seattle Sounders FC; Lee Nguyen (USA) – New England Revolution; Bradley Wright-Phillips (ENG) – New York Red Bulls	
2016	Sebastian Giovinco playing for FC Toronto in 2015	Sebastian Giovinco	ITA	Toronto FC	Forward	Kei Kamara (SLE) – New England Revolution; Laurent Ciman (BEL) – Montreal Impact; Luis Robles (USA) – New York Red Bulls	
2017	Villa with New York City in May 2015	David Villa	ESP	New York City FC	Forward	Andre Blake (JAM) – Philadelphia Union; Stefan Frei (SUI) – Seattle Sounders FC; Matt Hedges (USA) – FC Dallas; Bradley Wright-Phillips (ENG) – New York Red Bulls	
2018	Nemanja Nikolic playing for the Chicago Fire in May 2018	Nemanja Nikolić	HUN	Chicago Fire	Forward	Tim Melia (USA) – Sporting Kansas City; Ike Opara (USA) – Sporting Kansas City; Diego Valeri (ARG) – Portland Timbers	
2019	Zlatan Ibrahimović attending the 2018 FIFA World Cup	Zlatan Ibrahimović	SWE	LA Galaxy	Forward	Josef Martínez (VEN) – Atlanta United FC; Aaron Long (USA) – New York Red Bulls; Wayne Rooney (ENG) – D.C. United	
2020	Not awarded due to the COVID-19 pandemic						
2021	Diego Rossi in football team uniform	Diego Rossi	URU	Los Angeles FC	Forward	Andre Blake (JAM) – Philadelphia Union; Alejandro Pozuelo (ESP) – Toronto FC; Lucas Zelarayán (ARM) – Columbus Crew	
2022	Carlos Vela, a Mexican footballer, on field during play	Carlos Vela	MEX	Los Angeles FC	Forward	Valentín Castellanos (ARG) – New York City FC; Jesús Ferreira (USA) – FC Dallas; Carles Gil (ESP) – New England Revolution	

== Statistics ==
Multiple winners and nominees
Name	Wins	Nominations
Landon Donovan	5	6
David Beckham	2	2
Robbie Keane	1	2
Chris Wondolowski	0	3
Juan Pablo Ángel	0	2
Andre Blake	0	2
Jeff Cunningham	0	2
Dwayne De Rosario	0	2
Bradley Wright-Phillips	0	2

Winners by team represented
Team	Wins	Nominations
LA Galaxy	9	12
New York Red Bulls	2	8
Chicago Fire	1	4
Toronto FC	1	3
New York City FC	1	2
Los Angeles FC	2	2
New England Revolution	0	6
D.C. United	0	5
FC Dallas	0	5
San Jose Earthquakes	0	4
Seattle Sounders FC	0	3
Sporting Kansas City	0	3
Columbus Crew	0	2
Montreal Impact	0	2
Philadelphia Union	0	2
Atlanta United FC	0	1
Colorado Rapids	0	1
Houston Dynamo	0	1
Portland Timbers	0	1

Winners by nation represented
Country	Winners	Nominations
USA	5	28
ENG	2	5
ESP	1	3
IRL	1	2
ITA	1	2
MEX	1	2
AUS	1	1
HUN	1	1
SWE	1	1
URU	1	1
ARG	0	4
COL	0	3
CAN	0	2
JAM	0	2
ARM	0	1
BEL	0	1
BOL	0	1
BRA	0	1
GRD	0	1
NGA	0	1
SLE	0	1
SUI	0	1
VEN	0	1

== See also ==
- Landon Donovan MVP Award
- MLS Best XI
