= Best Record-Breaking Performance ESPY Award =

Annual athletic award

- Awarded for: the best record-breaking performance
- Location: New York City (2026)
- Presented by: ESPN
- First award: 2001
- Currently held by: Myles Garrett
- Website: www.espn.co.uk/espys/

The Best Record-Breaking Performance ESPY Award it has been presented since 2001 to the amateur or professional sportsperson, irrespective of nationality or sport contested, adjudged to have, in a single play, game, or season, completed the best record-breaking (as well setting) performance, irrespective of the nature of the record broken.

Between 2001 and 2004, the award voting panel was comprised variously fans; sportswriters and broadcasters, sports executives, and retired sportspersons, termed collectively experts; and ESPN personalities, but balloting thereafter has been undertaken exclusively by fans over the Internet from amongst choices nominated by the ESPN Select Nominating Committee.

Through the 2001 iteration of the ESPY Awards, ceremonies were conducted in February of each year to honor achievements over the previous calendar year; awards presented thereafter are conferred in June and reflect performance from the June previous.

In 2024, Caitlin Clark became the first female athlete to win this award in history.

== List of winners ==
Best Record-Breaking Performance ESPY Award winners
Year of award	Image	Athlete	Nation of citizenship	Team	Competition, governing body, or league	Sport	Record set	Previous record-holder	Ref(s)
2001	Pete Sampras in 1992	Pete Sampras	United States	—N/a	ATP Tour	Tennis	Total career men's singles Grand Slam titles (13). This record has since been surpassed by Roger Federer.	Roy Emerson (12)	
2002	Tiger Woods in 2005	Tiger Woods	United States	—N/a	PGA Tour	Golf	Consecutive men's major championships won (Four—the 2000 U.S. Open, The Open Championship, and PGA Championship and the 2001 Masters Tournament [known as the consecutive Grand Slam])	Ben Hogan (three, in 1953)	
2003	Emmitt Smith in 2007	Emmitt Smith	United States	Dallas Cowboys	National Football League (NFL)	American football	Total career NFL rushing yards (17,162 at the close of the league's 2002 season, with 975 tallied therein)	American Walter Payton (16,726, across the 13 seasons between 1975 and 1987, inclusive)	
2004	Éric Gagné in 2008	Éric Gagné	Canada	Los Angeles Dodgers	Major League Baseball (MLB)	Baseball	Consecutive saves converted in a single MLB regular season (55 across the league's 2003 season)	Tom Gordon (46, in 1998)	
2005	Peyton Manning in 2010	Peyton Manning	United States	Indianapolis Colts	National Football League (NFL)	American football	Total single-season NFL passing touchdowns (49 in the league's 2004 season)	Dan Marino (48 in the 1984 season)	
2006	Shaun Alexander in 2008	Shaun Alexander	United States	Seattle Seahawks	National Football League (NFL)	American football	Total single-season NFL rushing touchdowns (27 in the league's 2005 season)	Priest Holmes (23, in 2003)	
2007	LaDainian Tomlinson in 2008	LaDainian Tomlinson	United States	San Diego Chargers	National Football League (NFL)	American football	Total single-season NFL rushing touchdowns (28 in the league's 2006 season)	Shaun Alexander (27, in 2005)	ǂ
2008	Brett Favre in 2008	Brett Favre	United States	Green Bay Packers	National Football League (NFL)	American football	Total career NFL passing touchdowns (442 at the close of the 2007 season, with 28 tallied therein)	Dan Marino (420, across the 17 seasons between 1983 and 1999, inclusive)	
2009	Michael Phelps in 2009	Michael Phelps	United States	—N/a	Olympic Games	Swimming	Total gold medals achieved at a single Games of the Olympiad (eight in the 2008 Summer Olympics)	Mark Spitz (seven, at the 1972 Summer Olympics)	
2010	Plaque commemorating the longest match in tennis history	John Isner vs. Nicolas Mahut	United States and France	—N/a	Wimbledon	Tennis	Longest match in tennis history, lasting 11 hours, 5 minutes; Isner defeated Mahut 70–68 in the fifth set of the 1st round match.	Fabrice Santoro vs. Arnaud Clément fourth round match at the 2004 French Open lasting 6 hours, 33 minutes.	
2011	Rory McIlroy in 2011	Rory McIlroy	Northern Ireland	—N/a	U.S. Open	Golf	In winning the U.S. Open, McIlroy broke tournament records for the lowest 72-hole score, both in total strokes (268) and in relation to par (−16).	72-hole score (272): Jim Furyk, 2003; Tiger Woods, 2000; Lee Janzen, 1993; Jack Nicklaus, 1980. To-par (−12): Woods, 2000.	
2012	Drew Brees in 2013	Drew Brees	United States	New Orleans Saints	National Football League (NFL)	American football	Brees threw for 5,476 yards in 2011–12, breaking the NFL single-season record.	Dan Marino (5,084 yards in 1984)	
2013	Michael Phelps in 2014	Michael Phelps (2)	United States	—N/a	Olympic Games	Swimming	Phelps became the most decorated Olympian in history, finishing the London Olympics with a total of 22 medals.	Larisa Latynina (19 medals, 1956–1964, representing the Soviet Union)	
2014	Peyton Manning in 2014	Peyton Manning (2)	United States	Denver Broncos	National Football League (NFL)	American football	Manning set single-season NFL records for both passing yardage (5,477) and touchdown passes (55) in the 2013 season.	Yardage: Drew Brees (5,476 yards in 2011); TDs: Tom Brady (50 in 2007)	
2015	Peyton Manning in 2015	Peyton Manning (3)	United States	Denver Broncos	National Football League (NFL)	American football	Manning set the NFL record for career touchdown passes (530 at the end of the 2014 season).	Brett Favre (touchdown passes 1991–2010)	
2016	Stephen Curry in 2016	Stephen Curry	United States	Golden State Warriors	National Basketball Association (NBA)	Basketball	Curry set the record for most three-point field goals in a season with 402.	Curry had the previous record, 286 in the 2014–15 season.	
2017	Michael Phelps in 2017	Michael Phelps (3)	United States	—N/a	Olympic Games	Swimming	Phelps extended his own record of being the most decorated Olympian during the Rio Olympics in 2016 with a total of 28 Olympic medals. He now has 23 Gold, 3 Silver, and 2 Bronze Olympic Medals.	Phelps previously held the record when he broke it in the London 2012 Olympics where he finished with a grand total of 22 Olympic medals.	
2018		Roger Federer	Switzerland	—N/a	Wimbledon	Tennis	Most Wimbledon Gentlemen's Singles championships all time with 8	Federer was previously tied with William Renshaw & Pete Sampras with 7	
2019		Drew Brees (2)	United States	New Orleans Saints	National Football League (NFL)	American football	Brees set the record for most passing yards (71,940)	Peyton Manning	
2020	Not awarded due to the COVID-19 pandemic								
2021		Russell Westbrook	United States	Washington Wizards	National Basketball Association (NBA)	Basketball	Westbrook set the record for most career triple-doubles (182)	Oscar Robertson (181)	
2022		Stephen Curry (2)	United States	Golden State Warriors	National Basketball Association (NBA)	Basketball	Curry set the record for most career three-point field goals (3,117)	Ray Allen (2,973)	
2023		LeBron James	United States	Los Angeles Lakers	National Basketball Association (NBA)	Basketball	James set the record for most NBA career points (38,652)	Kareem Abdul-Jabbar (38,387)	
2024		Caitlin Clark	United States	Iowa Hawkeyes	National Collegiate Athletic Association (NCAA)	Basketball	Clark set the record for most NCAA career points scored (men's and women's) (3,951)	Pete Maravich (3,667)	
2025		Alexander Ovechkin	Russia	Washington Capitals	National Hockey League (NHL)	Ice hockey	Ovechkin set the record for most NHL career goals (895)	Wayne Gretzky (894)	
2026		Myles Garrett	United States	Cleveland Browns	National Football League (NFL)	American football	Garrett set the record for most sacks in a single season (23).	Michael Strahan & T. J. Watt (22.5)	

== See also ==
- Sports records and statistics
