= Best U.S. Olympian ESPY Award =

Annual athletic award

The Best U.S. Olympian ESPY Award was presented in 2002 and 2006 to the sportsperson or team, irrespective of gender, affiliated with the United States Olympic Committee and contesting sport internationally adjudged to be the best. The award serves in practice to replace the gender-specific Best Male and Best Female Olympic Performance ESPY Awards, which were presented in 2005. The Best U.S. Male Olympian ESPY Award and Best U.S. Female Olympian ESPY Award superseded this award.

Balloting for the award is undertaken by fans over the Internet from amongst between three and five choices selected by the ESPN Select Nominating Committee, and the award is conferred in June to reflect performance and achievement over the twelve months previous.

== List of winners ==
Year	Athlete	Sport and discipline or event contested
2002	Sarah Hughes	Figure Skating
2006	Shaun White	Snowboarding (halfpipe)

== See also ==
- USOC Sportsman of the Year Award
- USOC Team of the Year Award
- United States at the Olympics
- United States Olympic Hall of Fame
