= Eli Tomac =

American motorcycle racer (born 1992)

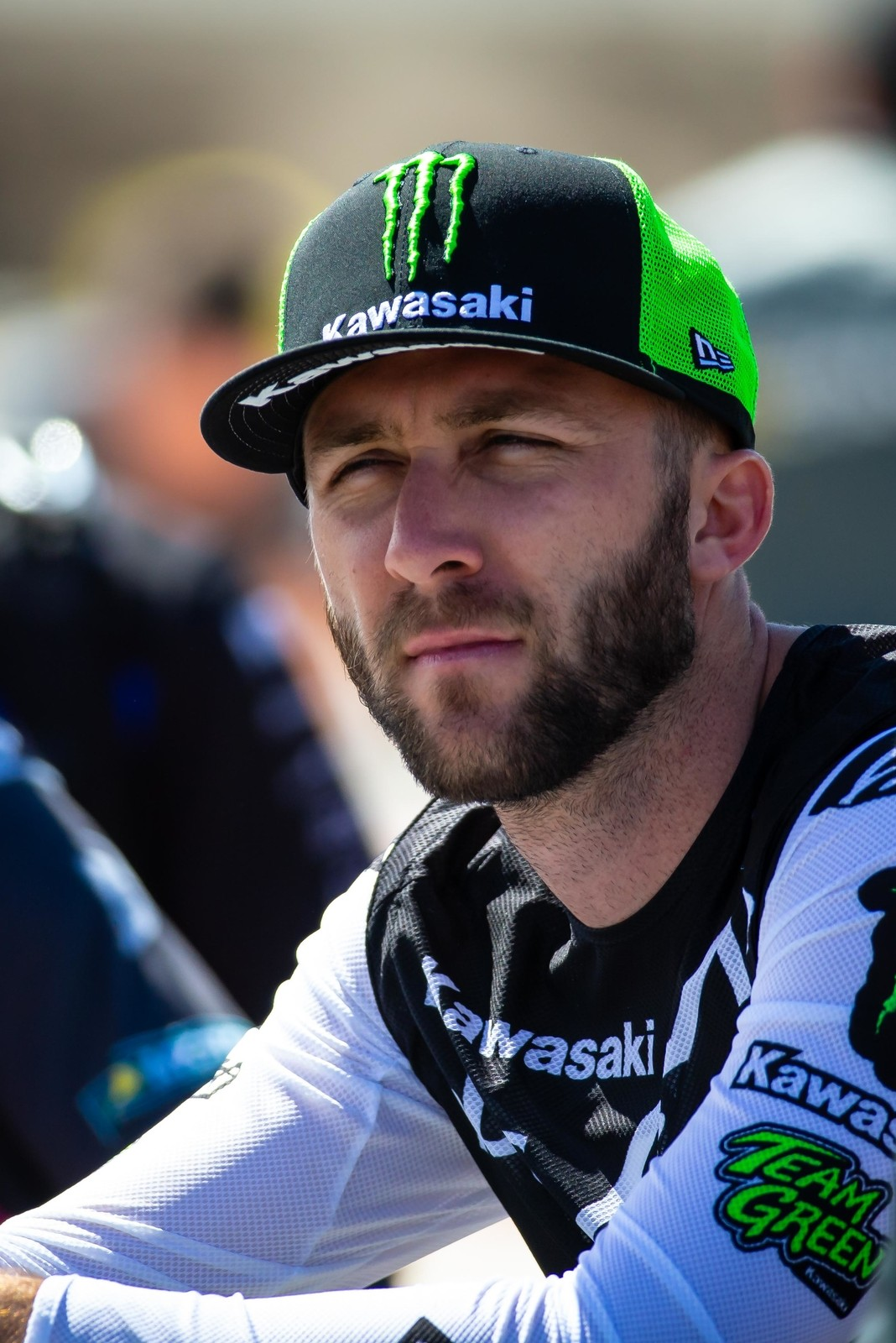
- Tomac In 2020
- Nationality: American
- Born: November 14, 1992 (age 33) Cortez, Colorado, US

Motocross career
- Years active: 2010–2026
- Teams: •Geico Honda (2010-2015); •Monster Energy Kawasaki (2015-2021); •Monster Energy Yamaha Star Racing (2021-2025); •Red Bull KTM Factory Racing (2025-2026)
- Championships: •2009 FIM 125cc; •2012 AMA Supercross 250cc West; •2013 AMA Motocross 250cc; •2017 AMA Motocross 450cc; •2018 AMA Motocross 450cc; •2019 AMA Motocross 450cc; •2020 AMA Supercross 450cc; •2022 AMA Supercross 450cc; •2022 AMA Motocross 450cc; •2024 FIM World Supercross 450cc
- Wins: •AMA 250cc Supercross: 12; •AMA 250cc Motocross: 12; •AMA 450cc Supercross: 57; •AMA 450cc Motocross: 32; •MXGP: 2; AMA Total: 113

Eli Tomac (born November 14, 1992) is an American former professional Motocross and Supercross racer who competed in the AMA Supercross and Motocross championships from 2010 to 2026; a two-time AMA 450cc Supercross champion, four-time AMA 450cc Motocross champion, AMA 250cc Supercross West & 250cc AMA Motocross champion. He is second all-time in 450cc AMA Supercross wins with 57, and third all-time in 450cc AMA Motocross wins with 32.

Tomac began his professional career in 2010, winning his first race in his rookie debut. He made his 450cc debut midway through the 2013 Supercross schedule, returning to the class full-time in 2014.

Tomac won his first 450cc outdoor event at the 2014 Spring Creek National in Millville, Minnesota. His first 450cc Supercross win came in 2015 at Chase Field in Phoenix, Arizona.

Tomac was part of the Kawasaki factory racing team from 2016 to 2021. He joined Monster Energy Yamaha Star Racing for the 2022 season. From November 2025 to September 2026, Tomac rode for the Red Bull KTM Factory Racing Team.

Tomac is an eight-time Daytona supercross winner. With victories on three manufacturers including; 2016, 2017, 2019, 2020 & 2021 with Kawasaki, 2022 & 2023 with Yamaha, & 2026 with KTM.

Tomac was a member of the winning USA team at the 2022 Motocross Des Nations.

== Career ==
=== Amateur career ===
As an amateur, Tomac won eight Loretta Lynn’s Amateur Championship titles. He didn't win titles right away or through his first five years (from 1999 through 2003). His first title came in 2004. Tomac's amateur titles are as follows:

- 2004 65cc(10–11) Stock,
- 2006 85cc(12–13) Modified,
- 2007 85cc(14–15) Modified,
- 2008 Supermini 1(12–15),
- 2008 Supermini 2(14–16),
- 2009 250B Modified,
- 2009 Schoolboy 2(14–16).

In 2009, Tomac won the 125cc FIM Junior World Championship, held in Taupō, New Zealand.

=== 250cc career ===
2010-2013, Geico Honda

Tomac became the first rider to win their professional debut in 2010, securing victory at the 250cc AMA Motocross season opener at Hangtown in Rancho Cordova, California, while riding for Team Geico Honda. In 2011, Tomac recorded two wins and six podium finishes in the 250cc AMA Supercross series, finishing second in the 250SX West Championship, six points behind Broc Tickle. The 2012 season saw Tomac claim the 250cc Supercross championship with five main event wins and seven podium finishes. In the AMA Motocross outdoor series, he placed third overall, with four overall victories.

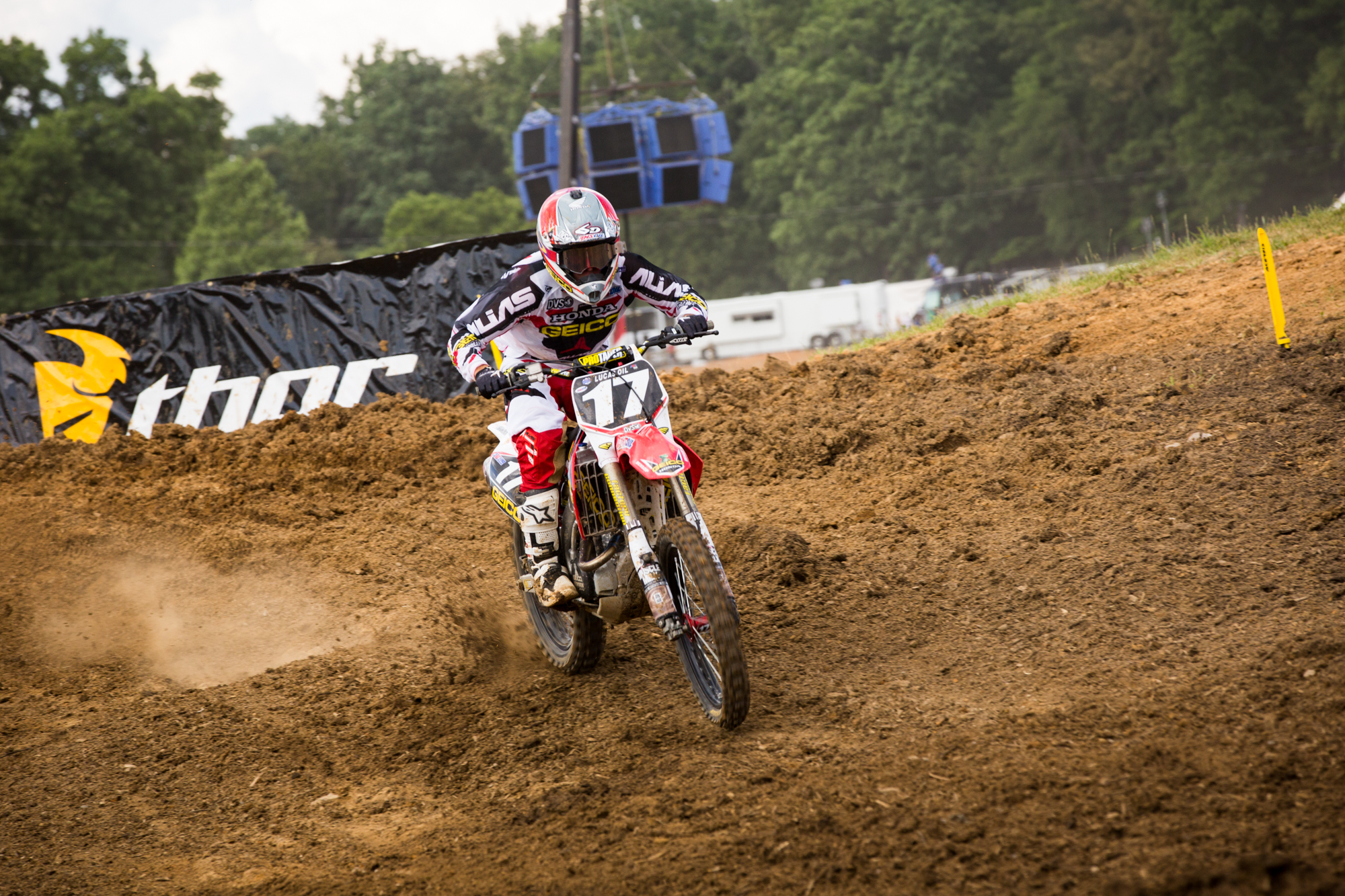
Tomac in 2013 at the Muddy Creek National.

During the 2013 Supercross season, Tomac narrowly missed defending his title, finishing two points behind Ken Roczen despite securing five wins. He won the AMA Motocross 250cc title with seven overall wins and 12 consecutive podium finishes.

=== 450cc career ===
2014-2015, Geico Honda

Tomac's 2014 season was his full-time debut in the 450cc class, as he transitioned from the 250cc division.

Tomac's rookie 450SX Supercross season was hindered by injuries, including a broken collarbone sustained in April, which limited his participation and performance. Despite these setbacks, he managed to secure three podium finishes and concluded the season 13th overall with 115 points.

After missing the initial four rounds due to injury, Tomac debuted in the 450 Class at the RedBud National. He won second-place overall finish with 4-2 moto scores, trailing only Ken Roczen. At the Spring Creek National, he achieved his first career 450 Class overall victory by sweeping both motos. He ended in fifth place in the overall standings with 319 points.

Tomac began the Lucas Oil Pro Motocross Championship by winning the first five motos and securing overall victories at Hangtown and Glen Helen. At Hangtown, he won the second moto by a staggering 90 seconds. However, his season was abruptly halted at the Thunder Valley National, where a crash in the second moto resulted in a dislocated right shoulder and a partially torn rotator cuff in the left shoulder. The crash required surgery and extensive rehabilitation.

2016-2021, Monster Energy Kawasaki

In 2015, Tomac made a major career move by leaving the GEICO Honda team to join Monster Energy Kawasaki for the 2016 season. The transition was highly anticipated, as Tomac was expected to be a title contender. However, he finished fourth overall in the standings. In the Pro Motocross Championship, Tomac finished second in the series.

After six rounds of the 2017 Monster Energy AMA Supercross season, Tomac was in fourth place in the 450 class overall point standings. His mixed results (5th, 6th, 8th, 1st, 1st, 15th) put him 29 points behind supercross points leader Ryan Dungey. Following round 6, Tomac won six of the next eight races and was tied for first place in the point standings with Dungey. At round 15 in Salt Lake City, Utah, Tomac put forth a dominating effort to win his 9th supercross main event in 2017. Going into the penultimate round of Supercross in East Rutherford, New Jersey, Tomac held a 3-point lead over Dungey. However, in the main event, a series of mistakes led him to finish in eighth place. Ryan Dungey won the race and took an eight-point advantage over Tomac with one round remaining. At the final round of Monster Energy AMA Supercross in Las Vegas, Nevada, Tomac finished second and Dungey placed fourth. Tomac came up five points short of the championship.

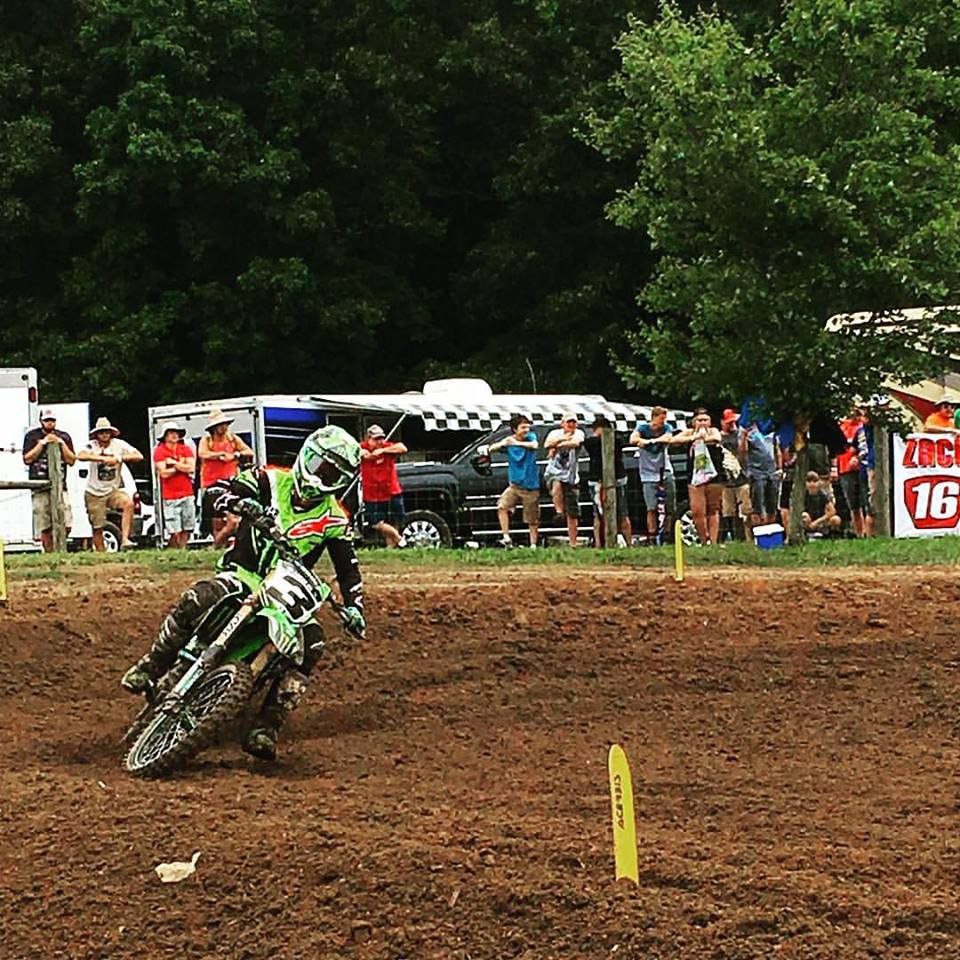
Tomac in 2017 at Muddy Creek.

Tomac began the 2017 AMA Motocross Championship season by winning the opening round. Tomac won four overalls and finished on the podium at seven of the 12 rounds. He won the 2017 motocross title scoring a total of 470 points.

Tomac's 2018 Monster Energy AMA Supercross campaign began with a crash at the season opener in Anaheim, result in a shoulder injury that made him to miss the subsequent round in Houston. Still, Tomac won eight main event victories, including a commanding win in St. Louis where he led all 27 laps and finished over 20 seconds ahead of the runner-up. However, the early points deficit proved insurmountable, and he ended the season third overall in the 450SX standings. Transitioning to the Lucas Oil Pro Motocross Championship, Tomac exhibited unparalleled prowess. He commenced the season with a series of dominant performances, winning the first five rounds, including a notable come-from-behind victory at the Tennessee National. Throughout the season, he amassed eight overall wins and clinched 15 out of 24 moto victories, culminating in his second consecutive 450MX title.

Tomac secured six main event victories during the 2019 Monster Energy AMA Supercross Championship. Notable wins included San Diego, Daytona, Indianapolis, Nashville, Denver, and the season finale in Las Vegas. Despite these successes, consistency issues in certain rounds led to a second-place finish in the overall standings, with 361 points, trailing champion Cooper Webb by 18 points. Transitioning to the Lucas Oil Pro Motocross Championship, Tomac exhibited remarkable dominance. He achieved overall victories at multiple rounds, including Fox Raceway, High Point, RedBud, Washougal, Budds Creek, and Ironman. His performance at Budds Creek was particularly significant, where he clinched his third consecutive 450MX title, becoming only the fourth rider in history to achieve this feat. Tomac concluded the season with 521 points, underscoring his supremacy in the outdoor series.

Coming into the 2020 supercross season, Tomac was once again picked as a favorite for the 450cc championship. He showcased a newfound consistency this year in which he finished on the podium twelve times as well as a worst finish of seventh, which came at the opening round.

Tomac's first win came at round 3 in Anaheim, California. From then until round nine in Atlanta, Georgia. Tomac would finish 2nd, 1st, 4th, 1st, 1st, 4th. Coming into the tenth round at Daytona, Tomac found himself tied on points alongside Ken Roczen with 200. Tomac would win his fifth race of the season as well as his fourth Daytona Supercross. Following his win on March 7, the season was suspended due to the COVID-19 pandemic. Shortly after, Feld Motorsports announced the season would finish in four weeks with seven rounds in Salt Lake City, with Sunday and Wednesday rounds only and the first race being contested on May 31.

In the last seven rounds, Tomac finished 1st, 2nd, 1st, 3rd, 3rd, 2nd & 5th, securing his first 450cc class AMA Supercross Championship. He ended the season with 384 points, 25 ahead of Cooper Webb on 359, and 30 clear of Ken Roczen with 354.

2021 was Eli’s contract year at Monster Energy Kawasaki. Tomac struggled to find consistency in his results for the supercross season. Coming in as the defending champion, he managed to win three races as well as eight podiums on his way to a third-place finish in the championship. Tomac began Motocross nationals by placing ninth, tenth and third in the opening rounds. He ended the season with two overall wins and a distant second-place finish in the point standings.

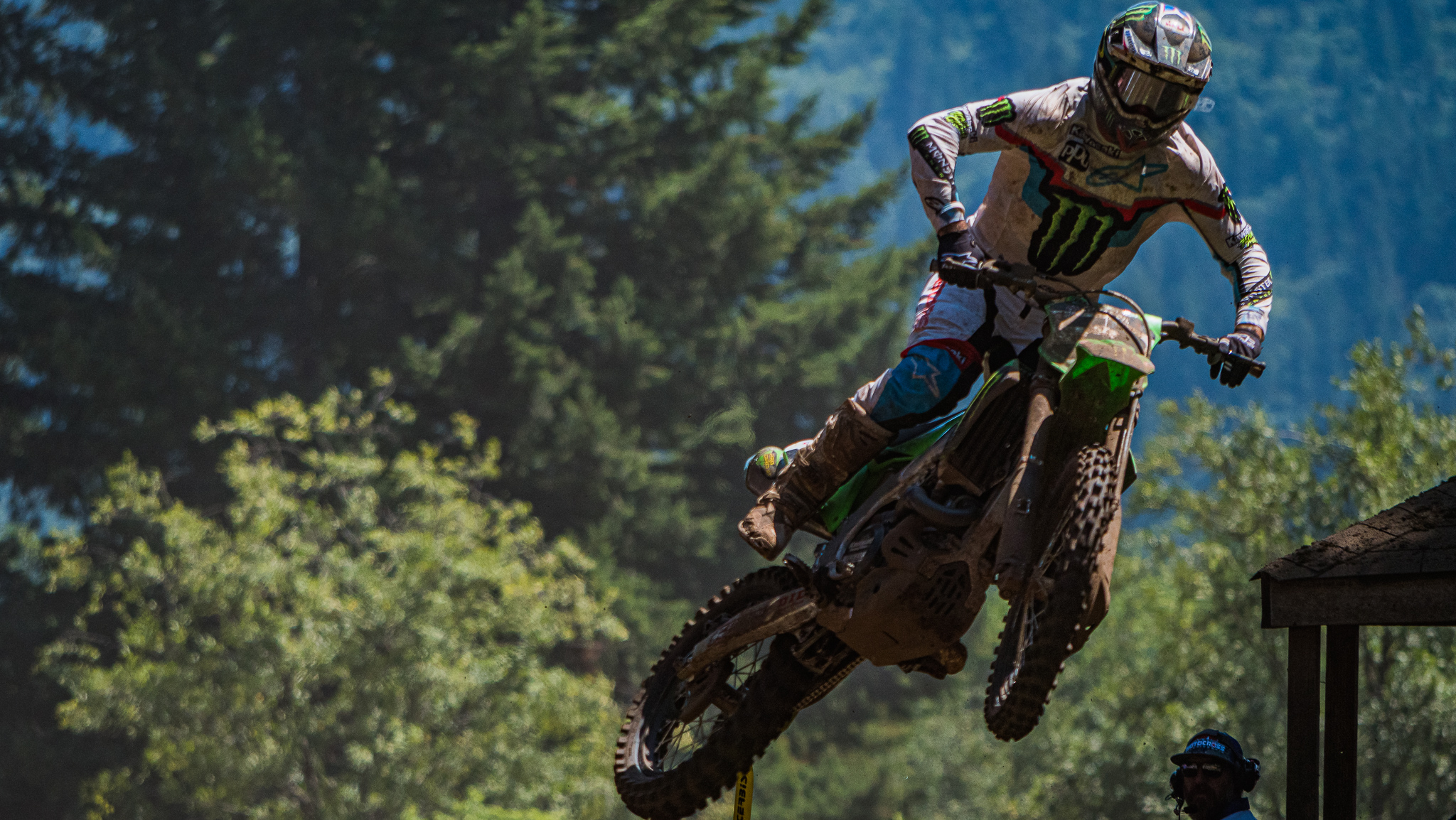
Tomac in 2021 at the Washougal National.

2021-2025, Monster Energy Star Racing Yamaha

In his debut season with Monster Energy Star Racing Yamaha, Tomac clinched his second 450SX Supercross title. He secured seven main event victories and stood on the podium 11 times, amassing a total of 359 points—nine more than runner-up Jason Anderson. Tomac sealed the championship at Round 16 in Denver, becoming the first rider to win a Supercross title for Yamaha since 2009. He was awarded the Best Male Action Sports Athlete ESPY Award at the 2022 ESPY Awards.

Transitioning to the outdoor season, Tomac engaged in a fierce battle with Honda's Chase Sexton. After a modest start, he gained momentum with a victory at High Point Raceway and went on to win multiple rounds, including RedBud, Southwick, and Spring Creek. The championship culminated at Fox Raceway II, where Tomac delivered a decisive 1-1 moto sweep, securing his fourth 450MX title by a seven-point margin over Sexton. He was the first person since Ryan Dungey in 2015 to win both the AMA Supercross and Motocross Championships in the same year.

Fresh off from winning both the 2022 Supercross and Motocross championships as well as the MXON with Team USA, Tomac was a strong favorite for a repeat of the previous year. 2023 was also the inaugural year for the new SuperMotocross World Championship, in which the AMA Supercross and Motocross Championships were combined along with three hybrid "SuperMotocross" playoff rounds. Tomac initially signed on only to compete in the supercross portion of the championship, but later signed on with Star Yamaha to compete for the entire championship.

For a majority of the 2023 AMA Supercross season, the championship was a tight three-way battle between Tomac, Cooper Webb, and Chase Sexton. After Webb dropped out of the supercross season due to injury at round 15, the championship again came down to Tomac and Sexton. The title came down to the penultimate round in Denver. Tomac entered Denver holding an 18-point lead over Sexton. However, while leading the main event Tomac overshot a jump that led to a hard landing and ruptured his Achilles tendon; he dropped out of the race and Sexton won the championship. Tomac later sat out the 2023 motocross season and the SuperMotocross playoff rounds to recover from his injury.

Tomac re-upped with Star Yamaha for the 2024 SuperMotocross Championship, signing to compete for the entire season. He trained with 250cc rider and teammate Haiden Deegan at the Tomac Ranch and began training in the fall of 2023. At the beginning of the 2024 AMA Supercross season, Tomac struggled for consistency early in the season as he both continued with his recovery from injury and adapting to an all new MXGP-inspired Yamaha bike. In the second half of the supercross season, Tomac began to show pace and consistency, with several podium finishes and a win at round 12 in St. Louis, Missouri.

Tomac missed the first 9 rounds of the 2024 AMA Pro Motocross season due to a thumb injury. On his return to racing at Budds Creek in Mechanicsville, Maryland, he finished seventh overall, and then podium the following weekend at Ironman Raceway in Crawfordsville, Indiana, in his second race back to Pro Motocross in nearly two years.

On August 21, Tomac announced that he had resigned with Star Racing Yamaha for the entirety of the 2025 SuperMotocross season.

Tomac entered the 2025 Monster Energy AMA Supercross Championship (450SX class) riding for the Monster Energy Yamaha Star Racing team. At Anaheim 1, he finished fifth. The following week, Tomac claimed the win in San Diego. Three weeks later misfortune struck Tomac for the third year in a row. During qualifying, Tomac suffered an incident that initially appeared to be a bruised calf and ankle sprain. He still raced the night show, finishing seventh in his heat and 17th in the main event—despite the injury. However, on February 11, 2025, it was confirmed that he had sustained a broken left fibula during qualifying during takeoff from a jump. The team announced he would undergo surgery to insert a plate and was placed on crutches and non-weight bearing. Recovery estimated at the time were six weeks before unrestricted training could resume.

=== Retirement ===
Eli Tomac, is an American motocross and supercross legend, he announced that he will retire from professional Supermotocross after the 2026 SMX World Championship postseason. During his 17-season professional career, the 33-year-old has one of the most decorated résumé in the sport's history, winning two 450SX titles and four 450MX titles. He retires with 57 450SX Main Event victories and 32 450MX overall wins, ranking second and fourth, respectively. Tomac viewed his decision to retire as the most difficult of his professional career, which ended with the SMX World Championship Final on September 26 at Ridgedale, Missouri.

== Motocross of Nations participation ==
Tomac has participated as part of Team U.S.A at the Motocross des Nations on six occasions.

=== 2013, Germany ===
In 2013 fresh off of his AMA Motocross 250cc title, Tomac was chosen for the MX2 position. The race was held in Teutschenthal, Germany. A crash in the first Moto relegated him to 16th. In Moto 2, Tomac finished second after a race long battle with Ken Roczen. Team U.S.A. placed second overall.

=== 2014, Latvia ===
In 2014, Tomac was chosen to fill the Open Class position. The race was held in Kegums, Latvia. He struggled to a sixth-place finish in his first Moto. After crashing with other riders at the start of the second Moto, Tomac put on a charge racing all the way up to a third-place finish. Team U.S.A placed third overall.

=== 2018, USA ===
In 2018, after winning the 450cc AMA Motocross title, Tomac accepted the team captain position in the MXGP class. The race was held at Red Bud MX in Buchanan, Michigan. Tomac raced to a fourth place in Moto 1 on a rain soaked, muddy track. In Moto 2, Tomac crashed but was able to race from the back of the pack to a seventh-place finish. Team U.S.A placed fifth overall.

=== 2022, USA ===
In 2022, after winning both the 450cc AMA Supercross and AMA Motocross titles, Tomac accepted the team captain position in the MXGP class once again. The race as in 2018 was also held at Red Bud MX and started out with a déjà vu feel as it had rained heavily the night before leaving the track soaked and muddy. Tomac (racing with number 101) set the tone for Team USA by racing to an overall Win in Moto 1 with his MX2 teammate Justin Cooper, taking ninth. Chase Sexton finished second in Moto 2, with Cooper scoring a fourth place leaving Team USA in the driver's seat for the overall win. In Moto 3, Tomac started tenth, but advised through his pit boards that Chase was in third and it wasn't needed for him to race with urgency as they had enough points to win. He finished in sixth place and Team U.S.A took the overall win for the first time in 11 years.

=== 2024, Great Britain ===
In 2024, Tomac was selected to fill in for an injured Chase Sexton in the MXGP class less than two weeks before the event. The race was held at Matterley Basin racetrack, Winchester, England. In Saturday's qualifying race, Tomac, running the number 22, had a bad start but worked his way up to seventh place. Team USA qualified tenth going into Sunday's races. The next day, Tomac started in the top-five, getting past Germany's Ken Roczen to get into fourth. The Netherlands Jeffrey Herlings fell from third, allowing Tomac past. He then found his way around Spain's Jorge Prado for second, where he would finish. Tomac holeshotted the second moto closely followed by Switzerland's Jeremy Seewer, Slovenia's Tim Gajser, and Jorge Prado. Prado found his way around Tomac briefly, but Tomac re-passed him a lap or two later. Tim Gajser found his way into second and started putting pressure on Eli, before finding a way past on lap 8. Australia's Jett Lawrence, after a bad start, found a way past Tomac into second. Tomac finished third, and Team USA second overall, just losing out to Australia. Team Netherlands rounded out the podium.

=== 2025, USA ===
Tomac delivered a strong and emotional performance at the 2025 Motocross of Nations, held at Ironman Raceway in Crawfordsville, Indiana. The event carried extra significance as it marked Tomac’s final race with Yamaha, closing a major chapter in his career. Originally, Team USA was set to include Tomac, Chase Sexton, and Haiden Deegan, but late-season injuries to Sexton and Deegan forced last-minute substitutions, bringing in Justin Cooper and RJ Hampshire. Despite the lineup shakeup, Tomac led the American effort with trademark determination and speed. After qualifying ninth in the MXGP class, Tomac entered Sunday’s motos focused and confident. In the first moto (MXGP + MX2), he finished fourth behind Jett Lawrence, Lucas Coenen, and Tim Gajser, giving the U.S. team a solid start. His standout ride came in the third and final moto (MXGP + Open), where he charged from mid-pack to finish second behind Hunter Lawrence. That result was crucial, as it helped Team USA secure second overall—tied with France on points but winning the tiebreaker thanks to Tomac’s consistency. Australia ultimately claimed the overall win with dominant rides from the Lawrence brothers, but Tomac’s pace was one of the few challenges they faced all weekend; in fact, he was the only rider to finish ahead of either Lawrence in any moto.

== AMA Supercross/Motocross results ==
Year	Rnd 1	Rnd 2	Rnd 3	Rnd 4	Rnd 5	Rnd 6	Rnd 7	Rnd 8	Rnd 9	Rnd 10	Rnd 11	Rnd 12	Rnd 13	Rnd 14	Rnd 15	Rnd 16	Rnd 17	Average Finish	Podium Percent	Place
2010 250 MX	1 HAN	6 FRE	16 HIG	10 BUD	8 THU	10 RED	11 SPR	7 WAS	6 UNA	7 SOU	4 STE	4 FOX	-	-	-	-	-	7.50	8%	6th
2011 250 SX-W	10 ANA	5 PHX	2 LOS	3 OAK	2 ANA	1 SDI	-	-	-	-	-	-	-	-	2 SEA	1 SLC	4 LAS	3.33	67%	2nd
2011 250 MX	4 HAN	5 FRE	3 HIG	4 BUD	3 THU	OUT RED	13 SPR	17 WAS	3 UNA	19 SOU	2 STE	9 FOX	-	-	-	-	-	7.45	36%	4th
2012 250 SX-W	3 ANA	4 PHX	1 LOS	1 OAK	1 ANA	DNF SDI	-	-	-	-	-	-	-	-	3 SEA	1 SLC	1 LAS	1.90	88%	1st
2012 250 MX	5 HAN	1 FRE	4 THU	1 HIG	4 BUD	3 RED	1 SPR	2 WAS	2 SOU	2 UNA	1 STE	7 ELS	-	-	-	-	-	2.75	67%	3rd
2013 250 SX-W	1 ANA	1 PHX	1 ANA	DNF OAK	3 ANA	1 SDI	-	-	-	-	-	-	-	-	2 SEA	6 SLC	1 LAS	2.00	88%	2nd
2013 250 MX	3 HAN	1 THU	2 TEN	3 HIG	2 BUD	1 SOU	2 RED	1 WAS	1 SPR	1 UNA	1 TOO	1 ELS	-	-	-	-	-	1.58	100%	1st
*2014 450 SX	DNS	OUT	OUT	OUT	21	7	11	21	2	DNS	OUT	OUT	6	9	3	2	DNS	9.11	33%	13th
†2014 450 MX	OUT	OUT	OUT	OUT	3	2	3	1	2	3	7	3	-	-	-	-	-	3.00	88%	5th
2015 450 SX	20	1	3	4	3	5	7	20	2	2	11	1	2	3	2	1	2	4.65	65%	2nd
‡2015 450 MX	1	1	7	OUT	OUT	OUT	OUT	OUT	OUT	OUT	OUT	OUT	-	-	-	-	-	3.00	67%	14th
2016 450 SX	4	4	4	7	3	6	5	11	1	5	5	7	9	7	2	2	3	5.00	29%	4th
2016 450 MX	3	3	3	4	2	2	1	3	1	3	4	3	-	-	-	-	-	2.67	83%	2nd
2017 450 SX	5	6	8	1	1	15	1	2	1	1	1	1	1	2	1	8	2	3.35	71%	2nd
2017 450 MX	1	9	5	4	1	1	1	3	2	9	3	6	-	-	-	-	-	3.75	58%	1st
2018 450 SX	DNF	DNS	1	1	13	DNF	1	1	3	2	1	15	1	1	2	2	1	3.21	86%	3rd
2018 450 MX	1	1	1	1	1	2	15	1	1	2	1	4	-	-	-	-	-	2.58	83%	1st
2019 450 SX	3	4	3	4	1	6	12	1	6	1	4	3	4	1	1	3	1	3.41	59%	2nd
2019 450 MX	2	1	2	1	2	3	1	3	1	4	1	1	-	-	-	-	-	1.83	92%	1st
2020 450 SX	7	4	1	2	1	4	1	1	4	1	1	2	1	3	3	2	5	2.52	71%	1st
§2020 450 MX	3	16	1	6	5	5	3	1	2	-	-	-	-	-	-	-	-	4.67	56%	3rd
2021 450 SX	13	1	5	2	3	7	5	6	1	8	2	3	1	5	3	10	9	4.94	47%	3rd
2021 450 MX	9	10	3	2	4	2	2	4	3	1	1	2	-	-	-	-	-	3.58	67%	2nd
2022 450 SX	6	4	2	1	1	2	6	1	1	1	1	1	3	2	7	5	Out	2.75	69%	1st
2022 450 MX	4	3	2	1	1	1	1	2	2	2	2	1	-	-	-	-	-	1.83	92%	1st
¶2023 450 SX	1	1	1	6	1	5	3	1	8	3	1	1	5	2	2	DNF	OUT	2.73	73%	2nd
~2023 450 MX	OUT	OUT	OUT	OUT	OUT	OUT	OUT	OUT	OUT	OUT	OUT	-	-	-	-	-	-	-	-	-
2024 450 SX	9	2	9	2	10	4	2	2	7	7	6	1	6	2	5	10	OUT	5.25	38%	4th
2024 450 MX	OUT	OUT	OUT	OUT	OUT	OUT	OUT	OUT	OUT	7	3	-	-	-	-	-	-	5.00	50%	21st
2025 450 SX	5	1	7	4	17	OUT	OUT	OUT	OUT	OUT	OUT	OUT	OUT	OUT	OUT	OUT	OUT	6.80	20%	16th
2025 450 MX	2 FOX	4 HAN	2 THU	3 HIG	3 SOU	13 RED	7 SPR	3 WAS	3 IRN	3 UNA	8 BUD	-	-	-	-	-	-	4.64	64%	3rd
2026 450 SX	1 ANA	1 SDI	3 ANA	4 HOU	12 GLE	1 SEA	2 ARL	1 DAY	2 IND	3 BIR	5 DET	6 STL	12 NAS	OUT CLE	OUT PHI	3 DEN	OUT SLC	4.00	64%	4th
2026 450 MX	DNF FOX	OUT HAN	OUT THU	OUT HIG	OUT RED	OUT SOU	11 SPR	14 WAS	11 UNA	9 BUD	5 IRN	-	-	-	-	-	-	10.00	-	14th

Notes:

- 1) As of 2023, the AMA Motocross Season (MX) is 11 rounds, the AMA Supercross Season (SX) is 17 rounds.
- * Missed 3ounds 1, 2, 3, 4, 10, 11, 12, and 17 of 2014 450 SX due to injuries.
- † Missed the first 4 Nationals of 2014 due to injury.
- ‡ Missed the remaining Nationals after round 3 of the 2015 MX Series due to injury.
- § The 2020 MX season was shortened to 9 rounds.
- ¶ The 2nd round of the 2023 SX (SMX) series (Oakland, CA) was rescheduled to take place after the 6th round due to flooding, but is still classified as the 2nd round. DNF round 16 (Denver) due to injury; ruptured left Achilles. Missed final round with injury.
- Missed all 11 rounds of 2023 450 MX due to injury.

== SMX Results ==
Year	Rnd 1	Rnd 2	Rnd 3	Average Finish	Podium Percent	Place
2023 450 SMX	OUT CON	OUT CHI	OUT LAC	-	-	-
2024 450 SMX	2 CON	4 FOR	3 LVE	3.00	66%	3rd
2025 450 SMX	3 CON	3 STL	3 LVE	3.00	100%	3rd
2026 450 SMX	14 COL	9 LOS	12 RID	11.67	-	11th
