= Best Driver ESPY Award =

Annual athletic award for motorsports

- Awarded for: Racing driver of the year
- Location: (United States) Los Angeles; New York City
- Presented by: ESPN
- First award: 1993
- Currently held by: (United Kingdom) Lando Norris
- Website: www.espn.co.uk/espys/

The Best Driver ESPY Award, known alternatively as the Best Auto Racing Driver ESPY Award, is an annual award honoring the achievements of an individual from the world of motorsports. It was first awarded as part of the ESPY Awards in 1993. The Best Driver ESPY Award trophy, designed by sculptor Lawrence Nowlan, has been presented annually to the racing driver adjudged to have performed the best in a given calendar year. Since 2004, the winner has been chosen by online voting through three to five choices selected by the ESPN Select Nominating Committee. Before that, determination of the winners was made by an panel of experts. Through the 2001 iteration of the ESPY Awards, ceremonies were conducted in February of each year to honor achievements over the previous calendar year; awards presented thereafter are conferred in July and reflect performance from the June previous. (Note: Because of the rescheduling of the ESPY Awards ceremony, the award presented in 2002 was given in consideration of performance betwixt Fethbruary 2001 and June 2002.)

The inaugural winner of the award was British driver Nigel Mansell who finished the 1992 season with a then record-breaking nine wins and fourteen pole positions en route to winning his sole Formula One World Drivers' Championship. Mansell moved to the Championship Auto Racing Teams the following year, and won the series title at the first attempt, earning him a second ESPY Award in 1994. Mansell is one of six drivers to have won the award more than once. As of 2022, multiple NASCAR Cup Series champions Jeff Gordon (1996, 1998, 1999, 2007) and his teammate Jimmie Johnson (2008, 2009, 2010, 2011) have won the most awards with four each. NASCAR drivers have won more awards than any other motorsports series, with nineteen victories, followed by Formula One with eight wins. It was not awarded in 2020 due to the COVID-19 pandemic. The most recent winner of the award was Formula One driver Lando Norris who won the award in 2026, his first award.

== Winners and nominees ==
Best Driver ESPY Award winners and nominees
Year	Image	Driver	Nationality	Racing series	Type of vehicle	Other nominees	Ref
1993	A mustached man in his late thirties is wearing blue racing overall and is looking at the camera.	Nigel Mansell	GBR	Formula One	Open wheel	N/A	
1994	A man in his early fifties is wearing a black baseball cap and is smiling at the camera.	Nigel Mansell (2)	GBR	CART	Open wheel	N/A	
1995	A man in his late forties smiling at the camera.	Al Unser Jr.	USA	CART	Open wheel	Dale Earnhardt (USA) – NASCAR; Michael Schumacher (GER) – Formula One	
1996	A man in his early twenties smiling at the camera.	Jeff Gordon	USA	NASCAR	Stock car	Michael Schumacher (GER) – Formula One; Jacques Villeneuve (CAN) – CART	
1997	–	Jimmy Vasser	USA	CART	Open wheel	Terry Labonte (USA) – NASCAR; Damon Hill (GBR) – Formula One	
1998	A man in his mid-twenties wearing sunglasses and rainbow-colored racing overalls	Jeff Gordon (2)	USA	NASCAR	Stock car	N/A	
1999	A man his late twenties wearing rainbow colored racing overalls. He has his left hand on his left hip and his right hand leaning against a solid surface.	Jeff Gordon (3)	USA	NASCAR	Stock car	Dale Earnhardt (USA) – NASCAR; Mark Martin (USA) – NASCAR	
2000	A mustached man in his early forties wearing sunglasses and blue and red racing overalls	Dale Jarrett	USA	NASCAR	Stock car	John Force (USA) – NHRA; Juan Pablo Montoya (COL) – CART	
2001	A man in his early forties wearing yellow racing overall and he is holding a HANS device	Bobby Labonte	USA	NASCAR	Stock car	Gil de Ferran (BRA) – CART; John Force (USA) – NHRA; Buddy Lazier (USA) – IndyCar	
2002	A man in his late thirties wearing a red T-shirt emblazoned with the Ferrari logo.	Michael Schumacher	GER	Formula One	Open wheel	Hélio Castroneves (BRA) – CART; Gil de Ferran (BRA) – CART; John Force (USA) – NHRA; Jeff Gordon (USA) – NASCAR; Kevin Harvick (USA) – NASCAR; Sam Hornish Jr. (USA) – IndyCar	
2003	A man in his late twenties is wearing sunglasses along with orange racing overalls and is holding a trophy with both his hands.	Tony Stewart	USA	NASCAR	Stock car	John Force (USA) – NHRA; Gil de Ferran (BRA) IndyCar; Sam Hornish Jr. (USA) – IndyCar; Michael Schumacher (GER) – Formula One	
2004	A man in his late twenties wearing sunglasses and red racing overalls	Dale Earnhardt Jr.	USA	NASCAR	Stock car	Scott Dixon (NZL) – IndyCar; Matt Kenseth (USA) – NASCAR; Tony Pedregon (USA) – NHRA; Michael Schumacher (GER) – Formula One	
2005	A man in his late thirties speaking into a microphone	Michael Schumacher (2)	GER	Formula One	Open wheel	Greg Anderson (USA) – NHRA; Kurt Busch (USA) – NASCAR; Dan Wheldon (GBR) – IndyCar	
2006	A man in his mid thirties is wearing orange racing overall and his waving to the crowd with his right hand	Tony Stewart (2)	USA	NASCAR	Stock car	Jimmie Johnson (USA) – NASCAR; Sam Hornish Jr. (USA) – IndyCar; Melanie Troxel (USA) – NHRA; Dan Wheldon (GBR) – IndyCar	
2007	A man in his late thirties with both his arms folded	Jeff Gordon (4)	USA	NASCAR	Stock car	Dario Franchitti (GBR) – IndyCar; Kevin Harvick (USA) – NASCAR; Jimmie Johnson (USA) – NASCAR; Tony Schumacher (USA) – NHRA	
2008	A man in his early thirties waving to the crowd with his right hand and is wearing white and blue racing overalls along with a similarly colored baseball cap	Jimmie Johnson	USA	NASCAR	Stock car	Kyle Busch (USA) – NASCAR; Scott Dixon (NZL) – IndyCar; Lewis Hamilton (GBR) – Formula One; Tony Schumacher (USA) – NHRA	
2009	A man in his early thirties signing his autograph for a fan. He is wearing sunglasses and a striped shirt	Jimmie Johnson (2)	USA	NASCAR	Stock car	Hélio Castroneves (BRA) – IndyCar; Scott Dixon (NZL) – IndyCar; Lewis Hamilton (GBR) – Formula One; Tony Schumacher (USA) – NHRA	
2010	A man in his early thirties looking to the left of the camera. He is wearing a black suit.	Jimmie Johnson (3)	USA	NASCAR	Stock car	Kyle Busch (USA) – NASCAR; Dario Franchitti (GBR) – IndyCar; Ron Hornaday Jr. (USA) – NASCAR; Tony Schumacher (USA) – NHRA	
2011	A man in his mid thirties speaking into a microphone. He is wearing a red and white baseball cap and a red t-shirt.	Jimmie Johnson (4)	USA	NASCAR	Stock car	Greg Anderson (USA) – NHRA; John Force (USA) – NHRA; Dario Franchitti (GBR) – IndyCar	
2012	A man in his mid forties wearing sunglasses and black and white racing overalls	Tony Stewart (3)	USA	NASCAR	Stock car	Dario Franchitti (GBR) – IndyCar; Sebastian Vettel (GER) – Formula One; Del Worsham (USA) – NHRA	
2013	A man wearing blue and white racing overalls is signing his autograph onto a picture of his race car.	Ryan Hunter-Reay	USA	IndyCar Series	Open wheel	Tony Kanaan (BRA) – IndyCar; Brad Keselowski (USA) – NASCAR; Sebastian Vettel (GER) – Formula One	
2014	A man in his mid thirties is wearing a black baseball car with sponsors and sunglasses over his eyes. He is also wearing yellow racing overalls.	Ryan Hunter-Reay (2)	USA	IndyCar Series	Open wheel	Scott Dixon (NZL) – IndyCar; Dale Earnhardt Jr. (USA) – NASCAR; John Force (USA) – NHRA	
2015	A man in his early forties smiling and waving to the crowd. He is wearing sunglasses along with a red baseball car and similarly colored racing overalls.	Kevin Harvick	USA	NASCAR	Stock car	Erica Enders-Stevens (USA) – NHRA; Lewis Hamilton (GBR) – Formula One; Juan Pablo Montoya (COL) – IndyCar; Will Power (AUS) – IndyCar	
2016	A man in his thirties being interviewed by the media. He has a green and black baseball cap on his head and is wearing identically colored racing overalls.	Kyle Busch	USA	NASCAR	Stock car	Scott Dixon (NZL) – IndyCar; Erica Enders-Stevens (USA) – NHRA; Lewis Hamilton (GBR) – Formula One; Alexander Rossi (USA) – IndyCar	
2017	A man in his early thirties wearing a black baseball cap and t-shirt. He has a gold neck chain across his body.	Lewis Hamilton	GBR	Formula One	Open Wheel	Ron Capps (USA) – NHRA; Jimmie Johnson (USA) – NASCAR; Simon Pagenaud (FRA) – IndyCar; Martin Truex Jr. (USA) – NASCAR	
2018	A bearded man in his mid thirties wearing black sunglasses and a black baseball cap with the number 78 on his right-hand side	Martin Truex Jr.	USA	NASCAR	Stock car racing	Brittany Force (USA) – NHRA; Lewis Hamilton (GBR) – Formula One; Josef Newgarden (USA) – IndyCar Series	
2019	A clean shaven man in his early thirties wearing a black suit, a white shirt and a gray tie	Kyle Busch (2)	USA	NASCAR	Stock car racing	Scott Dixon (NZL) – IndyCar Series; Lewis Hamilton (GBR) – Formula One; Steve Torrence – (USA) – NHRA	
2020	Not awarded due to the COVID-19 pandemic						
2021	A man in his early thirties wearing a black baseball cap and t-shirt. He has a gold neck chain across his body.	Lewis Hamilton (2)	GBR	Formula One	Open Wheel	Erica Enders (USA) – NHRA; Chase Elliott (USA) – NASCAR; Scott Dixon (NZL) – IndyCar	
2022		Kyle Larson	USA	NASCAR	Stock car racing	Álex Palou (ESP) – IndyCar; Steve Torrence (USA) – NHRA; Max Verstappen (NLD) – Formula One	
2023		Max Verstappen	NED	Formula One	Open Wheel	Brittany Force (USA) – NHRA; Kyle Larson (USA) – NASCAR; Josef Newgarden (USA) – IndyCar	
2024		Max Verstappen (2)	NED	Formula One	Open Wheel	Ryan Blaney (USA) – NASCAR; Matt Hagan (USA) – NHRA; Álex Palou (ESP) – IndyCar	
2025		Max Verstappen (3)	NED	Formula One	Open Wheel	Joey Logano (USA) – NASCAR; Álex Palou (ESP) – IndyCar; Oscar Piastri (AUS) – Formula One	
2026		Lando Norris	GBR	Formula One	Open Wheel	Tyler Reddick (USA) – NASCAR; Álex Palou (ESP) – IndyCar; Kimi Antonelli (ITA) – Formula One	

== Statistics ==
Winners by nation represented
Nation	Winners	Nominations
USA	23	73
GBR	5	18
NLD	3	4
GER	2	8
BRA	0	6
NZL	0	7
COL	0	2
ESP	0	4
AUS	0	1
CAN	0	1
FRA	0	1
ITA	0	1

Winners by series
Series	Winners	Nominations
NASCAR	19	40
Formula One	9	22
IndyCar	2	30
CART	3	8
NHRA	0	23

Multiple winners and nominees
Name	Wins	Nominations
Jimmie Johnson	4	7
Jeff Gordon	4	5
Max Verstappen	3	4
Tony Stewart	3	3
Lewis Hamilton	2	8
Michael Schumacher	2	6
Kyle Busch	2	4
Ryan Hunter-Reay	2	2
Nigel Mansell	2	2
Kevin Harvick	1	3
Dale Earnhardt Jr.	1	2
Scott Dixon	0	7
John Force	0	6
Dario Franchitti	0	4
Álex Palou	0	4
Tony Schumacher	0	4
Erica Enders	0	3
Gil de Ferran	0	3
Sam Hornish Jr.	0	3
Greg Anderson	0	2
Hélio Castroneves	0	2
Dale Earnhardt	0	2
Juan Pablo Montoya	0	2
Josef Newgarden	0	2
Sebastian Vettel	0	2
Dan Wheldon	0	2

== See also ==
- Auto racing trophies and awards
- List of CART/Champ Car champions
- List of Formula One World Drivers' Champions
- List of Indy Racing League champions
- List of Monster Energy NASCAR Cup Series champions
