= Best Female Athlete ESPY Award =

Annual athletic award

- Awarded for: Best Female Athlete
- Location: New York City (return in 2026)
- Country: United States
- Presented by: ESPN
- First award: 2000
- Currently held by: A'ja Wilson (United States)
- Website: www.espn.co.uk/espys/

The Best Female Athlete ESPY Award, but it is known alternatively as the Outstanding Female Athlete ESPY Award, has been presented annually at the ESPY Awards (Excellence in Sports Performance Yearly Award) since 1993 to the female voted to be, irrespective of nationality or sport contested, the best athlete in a given calendar year. Between 1993 and 2004, the award voting panel comprised variously of fans; sportswriters and broadcasters, sports executives, and retired sportspersons, termed collectively experts; and ESPN personalities, but balloting thereafter has been exclusively by fans over the Internet from amongst choices selected by the ESPN Select Nominating Committee. Through the 2001 iteration of the ESPY Awards, ceremonies were conducted in February of each year to honor achievements over the previous calendar year; awards presented thereafter are conferred in June and reflect performance from the June previous.

To date a total of seven athletes who are American soccer player Mia Hamm, Swedish golfer Annika Sörenstam, American alpine skier Lindsey Vonn, American tennis player Serena Williams, American mixed martial artist Ronda Rousey, American gymnast Simone Biles, and American basketball player A'ja Wilson have won the award twice. Hamm was honored in 1998 and 2000, Sörenstam in 2005 and 2006, Vonn in 2010 and 2011, Williams in 2003 and 2013, Rousey in 2014 and 2015, Biles in 2017 and 2025, and Wilson in 2024 and 2026. Sörenstam, Osaka, and Monica Seles are the only honorees not to represent the United States at the time of their win. Of the winners, eight have played basketball, the most of any sport; the other sports with multiple individuals awarded are tennis, gymnastics, soccer, and swimming. The award wasn't given in 2020 due to the COVID-19 pandemic.

== List of winners ==
Year	Image	Athlete	Nation represented	Sport	Ref(s)
1993	Monica Seles in 1991	Monica Seles	FR Yugoslavia	Tennis	
1994	Julie Krone in 2003	Julie Krone	United States	Thoroughbred horse racing	
1995	Bonnie Blair in 2010	Bonnie Blair	United States	Speed skating	
1996	Rebecca Lobo in 2010	Rebecca Lobo	United States	Basketball	
1997	Amy Van Dyken in 2017	Amy Van Dyken	United States	Swimming	
1998	Mia Hamm in 1995	Mia Hamm	United States	Soccer	
1999	Chamique Holdsclaw in 2016	Chamique Holdsclaw	United States	Basketball	
2000	Mia Hamm in 2006	Mia Hamm (2)	United States	Soccer	
2001	Marion Jones in 2000	Marion Jones	United States	Track and field	
2002	Venus Williams in 2006	Venus Williams	United States	Tennis	
2003		Serena Williams	United States	Tennis	
2004	Diana Taurasi in 2007	Diana Taurasi	United States	Basketball	
2005	Annika Sorenstam in 2006	Annika Sörenstam	Sweden	Golf	
2006	Annika Sorenstam in 2008	Annika Sörenstam (2)	Sweden	Golf	
2007	Taryne Mowatt attending a Red Carpet event in 2008	Taryne Mowatt	United States	Softball	
2008	Candace Parker in 2012	Candace Parker	United States	Basketball	
2009	Nastia Liukin in 2009	Nastia Liukin	United States	Gymnastics	
2010	Lindsey Vonn in 2010	Lindsey Vonn	United States	Alpine skiing	
2011	Lindsery Vonn in 2011	Lindsey Vonn (2)	United States	Alpine skiing	
2012	Brittney Griner in 2015	Brittney Griner	United States	Basketball	
2013	Serena Williams in 2013	Serena Williams (2)	United States	Tennis	
2014	Ronda Rousey in 2018	Ronda Rousey	United States	Mixed martial arts	
2015	Ronda Rousey in 2018	Ronda Rousey (2)	United States	Mixed martial arts	
2016	Breanna Stewart in 2017	Breanna Stewart	United States	Basketball	
2017	Simone Biles in 2016	Simone Biles	United States	Gymnastics	
2018		Chloe Kim	United States	Snowboarding	
2019		Alex Morgan	United States	Soccer	
2020	Not awarded due to the COVID-19 pandemic				
2021		Naomi Osaka	Japan	Tennis	
2022		Katie Ledecky	United States	Swimming	
2023		Mikaela Shiffrin	United States	Alpine skiing	
2024		A'ja Wilson	United States	Basketball	
2025	Biles in 2024	Simone Biles (2)	United States	Gymnastics	
2026	Wilson with the Las Vegas Aces in 2024	A'ja Wilson (2)	United States	Basketball	

== Statistics ==
Winners by sport contested
Sport contested	Winners (awards)	Winners (individuals)
Basketball	8	8
Tennis	5	4
Association football	3	2
Gymnastics	3	2
Swimming	2	2
Alpine skiing	3	2
Golf	2	1
Mixed martial arts	2	1
Track and field	1	1
Softball	1	1
Speed skating	1	1
Thoroughbred horse racing	1	1
Snowboarding	1	1

Winners by nation represented
Nation	Winners (awards)	Winners (individuals)
United States	29	24
Sweden	2	1
FR Yugoslavia	1	1
Japan	1	1

== See also ==
- List of sports awards honoring women
- Best Male Athlete ESPY Award
