= Best Jockey ESPY Award =

Annual athletic award

The Best Jockey ESPY Award, known alternatively as the Jockey of the Year ESPY Award, has been presented annually since 1994 to the thoroughbred horse racing jockey, irrespective of nationality or gender, adjudged to be the best of those riding in the United States in a given calendar year.

Between 1994 and 2004, the award voting panel comprised variously fans; sportswriters and broadcasters, sports executives, and retired sportspersons, termed collectively experts; and ESPN personalities, but balloting thereafter has been exclusively by fans over the Internet from amongst choices selected by the ESPN Select Nominating Committee.

Through the 2001 iteration of the ESPY Awards, ceremonies were conducted in February of each year to honor achievements over the previous calendar year; awards presented thereafter are conferred in June and reflect performance from the June previous. The award was not awarded in 2020 due to the COVID-19 pandemic.

== List of winners ==
Year	Jockey	Principal nation of citizenship
1994	Mike E. Smith	United States
1995	Chris McCarron	United States
1996	Jerry Bailey	United States
1997	Jerry Bailey (2)	United States
1998	Gary Stevens	United States
1999	Kent Desormeaux	United States
2000	Chris Antley	United States
2001	Kent Desormeaux	United States
2002	Victor Espinoza	Mexico
2003	José A. Santos	Chile
2004	Stewart Elliott	Canada
2005	Jeremy Rose	United States
2006	Edgar Prado	Peru
2007	Calvin Borel	United States
2008	Kent Desormeaux	United States
2009	Calvin Borel (2)	United States
2010	Calvin Borel (3)	United States
2011	John Velazquez	United States (Puerto Rico)
2012	Mario Gutierrez	Mexico
2013	Joel Rosario	Dominican Republic
2014	Victor Espinoza	Mexico
2015	Victor Espinoza (2)	Mexico
2016	Mario Gutierrez	Mexico
2017	John Velazquez	United States (Puerto Rico)
2018	José Ortiz	United States
2019	Mike Smith	United States
2020	Not awarded due to the COVID-19 pandemic	
2021	Joel Rosario	Dominican Republic
2022	José Ortiz (2)	United States

== See also ==
- Eclipse Award for Outstanding Jockey
- Eclipse Award for Outstanding Apprentice Jockey
