= Best Comeback Athlete ESPY Award =

Annual athletic award

The Best Comeback Athlete ESPY Award has been presented annually since 1993 to the sportsperson, irrespective of gender, contesting a team sport professionally under the auspices of one of the four major professional sports leagues in the United States and Canada or an individual sport on either an amateur or professional basis primarily in the United States or internationally under the auspices of a sport governing body adjudged to have made the most significant, profound, or impressive comeback from serious illness, injury, personal or familial hardship, retirement, or significant loss of form.

Between 1993 and 2004, the award voting panel comprised variously fans; sportswriters and broadcasters, sports executives, and retired sportspersons, termed collectively experts; and ESPN personalities, but balloting thereafter has been exclusively by fans over the Internet from amongst choices selected by the ESPN Select Nominating Committee.

Through the 2001 iteration of the ESPY Awards, ceremonies were conducted in February of each year to honor achievements over the previous calendar year; awards presented thereafter are conferred in June and reflect performance from the June previous. The award wasn't awarded in 2020 or 2021 due to the COVID-19 pandemic.

== List of winners ==
Year	Sportsperson	Nationality	Team	Competition, federation, or league	Sport
1993	Dave Winfield	United States	Toronto Blue Jays	Major League Baseball	Baseball
1994	Mario Lemieux	Canada	Pittsburgh Penguins	National Hockey League	Ice hockey
1995	Dan Marino	United States	Miami Dolphins	National Football League	American football
1996	Michael Jordan	United States	Chicago Bulls	National Basketball Association	Basketball
1997	Evander Holyfield	United States	—N/a	—N/a	Boxing (Heavyweight)
1998	Roger Clemens	United States	Toronto Blue Jays	Major League Baseball	Baseball
1999	Eric Davis	United States	Baltimore Orioles	Major League Baseball	Baseball
2000	Lance Armstrong	United States	US Postal	UCI ProTour	Road bicycle racing
2001	Andrés Galarraga	Venezuela	Atlanta Braves	Major League Baseball	Baseball
2002	Jennifer Capriati	United States	—N/a	WTA Tour	Tennis
2003	Tommy Maddox	United States	Pittsburgh Steelers	National Football League	American football
2004	Bethany Hamilton	United States	Surfing	—N/a	Surfing
2005	Mark Fields	United States	Carolina Panthers	National Football League	American football
2006	Tedy Bruschi	United States	New England Patriots	National Football League	American football
2007	No award given				
2008	Josh Hamilton	United States	Cincinnati Reds, Texas Rangers	Major League Baseball	Baseball
2009	Dara Torres	United States	—N/a	—N/a	Swimming
2010	Kim Clijsters	Belgium	—N/a	WTA Tour	Tennis
2011	Mark Herzlich	United States	Boston College Eagles	NCAA (Division I FBS)	American football
2012	Matthew Stafford	United States	Detroit Lions	National Football League (NFL)	American football
2013	Adrian Peterson	United States	Minnesota Vikings	National Football League (NFL)	American football
2014	Russell Westbrook	United States	Oklahoma City Thunder	National Basketball Association (NBA)	Basketball
2015	Rob Gronkowski	United States	New England Patriots	National Football League (NFL)	American football
2016	Eric Berry	United States	Kansas City Chiefs	National Football League (NFL)	American football
2017	Jordy Nelson	United States	Green Bay Packers	National Football League (NFL)	American football
2018	Not awarded				
2019	St. Louis Blues	United States	St. Louis Blues	National Hockey League (NHL)	Ice hockey
2020	Not awarded due to the COVID-19 pandemic				
2021	Not awarded due to the COVID-19 pandemic				
2022	Klay Thompson	United States	Golden State Warriors	National Basketball Association (NBA)	Basketball
2023	Jamal Murray	Canada	Denver Nuggets	National Basketball Association (NBA)	Basketball
2024	Simone Biles	United States	—N/a	—N/a	Gymnastics
2025	Sunisa Lee	United States	—N/a	—N/a	Gymnastics
2026	Christian McCaffrey	United States	San Francisco 49ers	National Football League (NFL)	American football

== See also ==
- ATP Comeback Player of the Year Award
- Bill Masterton Memorial Trophy (National Hockey League)
- MLB Comeback Player of the Year Award, The Sporting News Comeback Player of the Year Award
- MLS Comeback Player of the Year Award
- NFL Comeback Player of the Year Award
- WTA Comeback Player of the Year Award
