= Best NBA Player ESPY Award =

Annual athletic award

The Best NBA Player ESPY Award is an award presented annually since 1993 to a National Basketball Association (NBA) player adjudged to be the best in a given year, typically the NBA season contested during or immediately before the holding of the ESPY Awards ceremony.

Between 1993 and 2004, the award voting panel comprised variously fans; sportswriters and broadcasters, sports executives, and retired sportspersons, termed collectively experts.

Through the 2001 iteration of the ESPY Awards, ceremonies were conducted in February of each year to honor achievements over the previous calendar year; awards presented thereafter are conferred in June and reflect performance from the June previous. Seven players have won the award more than once; Michael Jordan won the inaugural award and a total of four across his career. LeBron James has won the award a total of seven times, the most by any player. Stephen Curry has won the award three times, while Tim Duncan, Kobe Bryant, Shaquille O'Neal, and Hakeem Olajuwon have claimed two each. The award wasn't awarded in 2020 due to the COVID-19 pandemic.

== Winners ==
Player was a member of the winning team in the NBA Finals.
Player was a member of the losing team in the NBA Finals.
* NBA Regular Season MVP
† NBA Finals MVP

| Year | Player | Nationality | Position | Team |
|---|---|---|---|---|
| 1993 | Michael Jordan *† | United States | Shooting guard | Chicago Bulls |
| 1994 | Charles Barkley * | United States | Power forward | Phoenix Suns |
| 1995 | Hakeem Olajuwon *† | Nigeria / United States | Center | Houston Rockets |
| 1996 | Hakeem Olajuwon (2) † | Nigeria / United States | Center | Houston Rockets |
| 1997 | Michael Jordan (2) *† | United States | Shooting guard | Chicago Bulls |
| 1998 | Michael Jordan (3) † | United States | Shooting guard | Chicago Bulls |
| 1999 | Michael Jordan (4) *† | United States | Shooting guard | Chicago Bulls |
| 2000 | Tim Duncan † | United States | Power forward | San Antonio Spurs |
| 2001 | Shaquille O'Neal *† | United States | Center | Los Angeles Lakers |
| 2002 | Shaquille O'Neal (2) † | United States | Center | Los Angeles Lakers |
| 2003 | Tim Duncan (2) *† | United States | Power forward | San Antonio Spurs |
| 2004 | Kevin Garnett * | United States | Power forward | Minnesota Timberwolves |
| 2005 | Steve Nash * | Canada | Point guard | Phoenix Suns |
| 2006 | Dwyane Wade † | United States | Shooting guard | Miami Heat |
| 2007 | LeBron James | United States | Small forward | Cleveland Cavaliers |
| 2008 | Kobe Bryant * | United States | Point guard | Los Angeles Lakers |
| 2009 | LeBron James (2) * | United States | Small forward | Cleveland Cavaliers |
| 2010 | Kobe Bryant (2) † | United States | Shooting guard | Los Angeles Lakers |
| 2011 | Dirk Nowitzki † | Germany | Power forward | Dallas Mavericks |
| 2012 | LeBron James (3) *† | United States | Small forward | Miami Heat |
| 2013 | LeBron James (4) *† | United States | Small forward | Miami Heat |
| 2014 | Kevin Durant * | United States | Small forward | Oklahoma City Thunder |
| 2015 | Stephen Curry * | United States | Point guard | Golden State Warriors |
| 2016 | LeBron James (5) † | United States | Small forward | Cleveland Cavaliers |
| 2017 | LeBron James (6) | United States | Small forward | Cleveland Cavaliers |
| 2018 | LeBron James (7) | United States | Small forward | Cleveland Cavaliers |
| 2019 | Giannis Antetokounmpo * | Greece | Power forward | Milwaukee Bucks |
| 2020 | Not awarded due to the COVID-19 pandemic | | | |
| 2021 | Stephen Curry (2) | United States | Point guard | Golden State Warriors |
| 2022 | Stephen Curry (3) † | United States | Point guard | Golden State Warriors |
| 2023 | Nikola Jokić † | Serbia | Center | Denver Nuggets |
| 2024 | Luka Dončić | Slovenia | Point guard | Dallas Mavericks |
| 2025 | Shai Gilgeous-Alexander *† | Canada | Point guard | Oklahoma City Thunder |
| 2026 | Jalen Brunson † | United States | Point guard | New York Knicks |

By player
| Winners | Selections |
|---|---|
| LeBron James | 7 |
| Michael Jordan | 4 |
| Stephen Curry | 3 |
| Kobe Bryant | 2 |
| Tim Duncan | 2 |
| Hakeem Olajuwon | 2 |
| Shaquille O'Neal | 2 |
| Giannis Antetokounmpo | 1 |
| Charles Barkley | 1 |
| Jalen Brunson | 1 |
| Luka Dončić | 1 |
| Kevin Durant | 1 |
| Kevin Garnett | 1 |
| Nikola Jokić | 1 |
| Steve Nash | 1 |
| Dirk Nowitzki | 1 |
| Dwyane Wade | 1 |

By team
| Team | Winners |
|---|---|
| Cleveland Cavaliers | 5 |
| Chicago Bulls | 4 |
| Los Angeles Lakers | 4 |
| Miami Heat | 3 |
| Golden State Warriors | 3 |
| Dallas Mavericks | 2 |
| Houston Rockets | 2 |
| Oklahoma City Thunder | 2 |
| Phoenix Suns | 2 |
| San Antonio Spurs | 2 |
| Denver Nuggets | 1 |
| Milwaukee Bucks | 1 |
| Minnesota Timberwolves | 1 |
| New York Knicks | 1 |
