= Best NHL Player ESPY Award =

Annual athletic award

The Best NHL Player ESPY Award has been presented annually since 1993 to the National Hockey League player, irrespective of nationality, adjudged to be the best in a given calendar year, typically most significantly in the NHL season contested during or immediately prior to the holding of the ESPY Awards ceremony.

Between 1993 and 2004, the award voting panel comprised variously fans, sportswriters, broadcasters, sports executives, and retired sportspersons, termed collectively experts; and retired sportspersons. Since then, balloting has been exclusively by fans over the Internet from among choices selected by the ESPN Select Nominating Committee.

Through the 2001 iteration of the ESPY Awards, ceremonies were conducted in February of each year to honor achievements over the previous calendar year; awards presented since then are conferred in June and reflect performance from the previous June.^{a}

Canadian centers Mario Lemieux Sidney Crosby, and Connor McDavid, wingers Jarome Iginla and Alexander Ovechkin, and Czech goaltender Dominik Hašek are the only players to have been honored multiple times; Lemieux, having captured the award three times, in 1993, 1994, and 1998, and Crosby having captured the award eight times, in 2007, 2008, 2009, 2010, 2013, 2014, 2016 and 2017.

Of the thirty awards conferred, just eight have gone to players not from Canada: two to Hasek and one to countrymate Jaromír Jágr, three to Americans Tim Thomas, Jonathan Quick and Patrick Kane, and two to Russian Alexander Ovechkin. Just one has gone to a defenseman, in 2001 to Canadian Chris Pronger. There were no awards in 2005 due to the NHL lockout and in 2020 due to the COVID-19 pandemic.

== Winners ==
Player was a member of the winning team in the Stanley Cup Final.
Player was a member of the defeated team in the Stanley Cup Final.
* Hart Memorial Trophy winner
† Conn Smythe Trophy winner

Year	Player	Country	Team	Position
1993	Mario Lemieux	Canada	Pittsburgh Penguins	Center
1994	Mario Lemieux (2)	Canada	Pittsburgh Penguins	Center
1995	Mark Messier	Canada	New York Rangers	Center
1996	Eric Lindros	Canada	Philadelphia Flyers	Center
1997	Joe Sakic	Canada	Colorado Avalanche	Center
1998	Mario Lemieux (3)	Canada	Pittsburgh Penguins	Center
1999	Dominik Hasek	Czech Republic	Buffalo Sabres	Goaltender
2000	Dominik Hasek (2)	Czech Republic	Buffalo Sabres	Goaltender
2001	Chris Pronger	Canada	St. Louis Blues	Defenseman
2002	Jarome Iginla	Canada	Calgary Flames	Right wing
2003	Jean-Sebastien Giguere †	Canada	Mighty Ducks of Anaheim	Goaltender
2004	Jarome Iginla(2)	Canada	Calgary Flames	Right wing
2005	No award given (2004–05 NHL lockout)			
2006	Jaromír Jágr	Czech Republic	New York Rangers	Right wing
2007	Sidney Crosby	Canada	Pittsburgh Penguins	Center
2008	Sidney Crosby (2)	Canada	Pittsburgh Penguins	Center
2009	Sidney Crosby (3)	Canada	Pittsburgh Penguins	Center
2010	Sidney Crosby (4)	Canada	Pittsburgh Penguins	Center
2011	Tim Thomas †	United States	Boston Bruins	Goaltender
2012	Jonathan Quick †	United States	Los Angeles Kings	Goaltender
2013	Sidney Crosby (5)	Canada	Pittsburgh Penguins	Center
2014	Sidney Crosby (6)	Canada	Pittsburgh Penguins	Center
2015	Jonathan Toews	Canada	Chicago Blackhawks	Center
2016	Sidney Crosby † (7)	Canada	Pittsburgh Penguins	Center
2017	Sidney Crosby † (8)	Canada	Pittsburgh Penguins	Center
2018	Alexander Ovechkin †	Russia	Washington Capitals	Left wing
2019	Alexander Ovechkin (2)	Russia	Washington Capitals	Left wing
2020	Not awarded due to the COVID-19 pandemic			
2021	Patrick Kane	United States	Chicago Blackhawks	Right wing
2022	Connor McDavid	Canada	Edmonton Oilers	Center
2023	Connor McDavid (2) *	Canada	Edmonton Oilers	Center
2024	Connor McDavid (3) †	Canada	Edmonton Oilers	Center
2025	Leon Draisaitl	Germany	Edmonton Oilers	Center
2026	Connor McDavid (4)	Canada	Edmonton Oilers	Center

== Notes ==
^aBecause of the rescheduling of the ESPY Awards ceremony, the award presented in 2002 was given in consideration of performance between February 2001 and June 2002.

== See also ==
- Hart Memorial Trophy
- Lester B. Pearson Award
- Ice hockey trophies and awards
- National Hockey League awards
- Vezina Trophy
