= Best Team ESPY Award =

Annual athletic award

The Best Team ESPY Award has been presented annually since 1993 to the professional, collegiate, or national team, irrespective of nationality or sport contested, adjudged to be the best in a specified twelve-month period preceding the awards ceremony. In 2001, the award was bifurcated and the resulting honors were styled as the College Team of the Year and Pro Team of the Year ESPY Awards; the awards were joined once more in 2002.

Between 1993 and 2004, the award voting panel comprised variously fans; sportswriters and broadcasters, sports executives, and retired sportspersons, termed collectively experts; and ESPN personalities, but balloting thereafter has been exclusively by fans over the Internet from amongst choices selected by the ESPN Select Nominating Committee.

Through the 2001 iteration of the ESPY Awards, ceremonies were conducted in February of each year to honor achievements over the previous calendar year; awards presented thereafter are conferred in July and reflect performance from the June previous. The award wasn't awarded in 2020 due to the COVID-19 pandemic.

== List of winners ==
Year	Team	League or competition	Sport
1993	Dallas Cowboys	National Football League	American football
1994	Toronto Blue Jays	Major League Baseball	Baseball
1995	New York Rangers	National Hockey League	Ice hockey
1996	UConn Women's Basketball Team	National Collegiate Athletic Association Division I	Basketball
1997	New York Yankees	Major League Baseball	Baseball
1998	Denver Broncos	National Football League	American football
1999	New York Yankees (2)	Major League Baseball	Baseball
2000	United States Women's National Soccer Team	1999 FIFA Women's World Cup	Association football (soccer)
2001	New York Yankees (3) Oklahoma Sooners	Major League Baseball National Collegiate Athletic Association Division I-A	Baseball American football
2002	Los Angeles Lakers	National Basketball Association	Basketball
2003	Anaheim Angels	Major League Baseball	Baseball
2004	Detroit Pistons	National Basketball Association	Basketball
2005	Boston Red Sox	Major League Baseball	Baseball
2006	Pittsburgh Steelers	National Football League	American football
2007	Indianapolis Colts	National Football League	American football
2008	Boston Celtics	National Basketball Association	Basketball
2009	Los Angeles Lakers (2)	National Basketball Association	Basketball
2010	New Orleans Saints	National Football League	American football
2011	Dallas Mavericks	National Basketball Association	Basketball
2012	Miami Heat	National Basketball Association	Basketball
2013	Miami Heat (2)	National Basketball Association	Basketball
2014	Seattle Seahawks	National Football League	American football
2015	United States Women's National Soccer Team (2)	2015 FIFA Women's World Cup	Association football (soccer)
2016	Cleveland Cavaliers	National Basketball Association	Basketball
2017	Golden State Warriors	National Basketball Association	Basketball
2018	Houston Astros	Major League Baseball	Baseball
2019	United States Women's National Soccer Team (3)	2019 FIFA Women's World Cup	Association football (soccer)
2020	Not awarded due to the COVID-19 pandemic		
2021	Tampa Bay Buccaneers	National Football League	American football
2022	Golden State Warriors (2)	National Basketball Association	Basketball
2023	Kansas City Chiefs	National Football League	American football
2024	South Carolina Gamecocks	National Collegiate Athletic Association Division I	Basketball
2025	Philadelphia Eagles	National Football League	American football
2026	New York Knicks	National Basketball Association	Basketball

== See also ==
- Sports trophies and awards
