= Best NFL Player ESPY Award =

Annual athletic award

The Best NFL Player ESPY Award has been presented annually since 1993 to the National Football League player adjudged to be the best in a given calendar year, namely in the NFL season immediately precedent to the holding of the ESPY Awards ceremony.

Between 1993 and 2004, the award voting panel comprised variously fans; sportswriters and broadcasters, sports executives, and retired sportspersons, termed collectively experts; but balloting thereafter has been exclusively by fans over the Internet from amongst choices selected by the ESPN Select Nominating Committee.

Through the 2001 iteration of the ESPY Awards, ceremonies were conducted in February of each year to honor achievements over the previous calendar year; awards presented thereafter are conferred in June and reflect performance from the June previous.

In 2014, Peyton Manning of the Denver Broncos became the first 3-time winner breaking a tie with Barry Sanders, Brett Favre, Marshall Faulk. Aaron Rodgers would later surpass him in 2017 when he won his fourth. The award wasn't awarded in 2020 due to the COVID-19 pandemic.

== Winners ==
Player was a member of the winning team in the Super Bowl.
Player was a member of the losing team in the Super Bowl.
* NFL MVP
† Super Bowl MVP

Year	Player	Team represented	Position played
1993	Emmitt Smith	Dallas Cowboys	Running back
1994	Emmitt Smith (2)*†	Dallas Cowboys	Running back
1995	Barry Sanders	Detroit Lions	Running back
1996	Brett Favre*	Green Bay Packers	Quarterback
1997	Brett Favre (2)*	Green Bay Packers	Quarterback
1998	Barry Sanders (2)*	Detroit Lions	Running back
1999	Terrell Davis*	Denver Broncos	Running back
2000	Kurt Warner*†	St. Louis Rams	Quarterback
2001	Marshall Faulk*	St. Louis Rams	Running back
2002	Marshall Faulk (2)	St. Louis Rams	Running back
2003	Michael Vick	Atlanta Falcons	Quarterback
2004	Peyton Manning*	Indianapolis Colts	Quarterback
2005	Peyton Manning (2)*	Indianapolis Colts	Quarterback
2006	Shaun Alexander*	Seattle Seahawks	Running back
2007	LaDainian Tomlinson*	San Diego Chargers	Running back
2008	Tom Brady*	New England Patriots	Quarterback
2009	Larry Fitzgerald	Arizona Cardinals	Wide receiver
2010	Drew Brees†	New Orleans Saints	Quarterback
2011	Aaron Rodgers†	Green Bay Packers	Quarterback
2012	Aaron Rodgers (2)*	Green Bay Packers	Quarterback
2013	Adrian Peterson*	Minnesota Vikings	Running back
2014	Peyton Manning (3)*	Denver Broncos	Quarterback
2015	Aaron Rodgers (3)*	Green Bay Packers	Quarterback
2016	Cam Newton*	Carolina Panthers	Quarterback
2017	Aaron Rodgers (4)	Green Bay Packers	Quarterback
2018	Tom Brady (2)*	New England Patriots	Quarterback
2019	Patrick Mahomes*	Kansas City Chiefs	Quarterback
2020	Not awarded due to the COVID-19 pandemic		
2021	Tom Brady (3)†	Tampa Bay Buccaneers	Quarterback
2022	Cooper Kupp†	Los Angeles Rams	Wide receiver
2023	Patrick Mahomes (2)*†	Kansas City Chiefs	Quarterback
2024	Patrick Mahomes (3)†	Kansas City Chiefs	Quarterback
2025	Saquon Barkley	Philadelphia Eagles	Running back
2026	Myles Garrett	Cleveland Browns	Defensive end

=== Multiple-time winners ===
Ranking	Player	Position	Team	Number of Awards	Years
1	Aaron Rodgers	QB	Green Bay Packers	4	2011, 2012, 2015, 2017
2	Peyton Manning	QB	Indianapolis Colts/Denver Broncos	3	2004, 2005, 2014
2	Tom Brady	QB	New England Patriots/Tampa Bay Buccaneers	3	2008, 2018, 2021
2	Patrick Mahomes	QB	Kansas City Chiefs	3	2019, 2023, 2024
3	Emmitt Smith	RB	Dallas Cowboys	2	1993, 1994
3	Brett Favre	QB	Green Bay Packers	2	1996, 1997
3	Barry Sanders	RB	Detroit Lions	2	1995, 1998
3	Marshall Faulk	RB	St. Louis Rams	2	2001, 2002

== See also ==
- National Football League Most Valuable Player Award
- NFL Defensive Player of the Year Award
- NFL Offensive Player of the Year Award
- UPI AFL-AFC Player of the Year
- UPI NFC Player of the Year
