= 2012 ESPY Awards =

Athletic awards show

The 2012 ESPY Awards were announced from Nokia Theatre on July 11, 2012 and showed during the telecast on ESPN, July 11, 2012. ESPY Award is short for Excellence in Sports Performance Yearly Award.

== Winners ==
- Best Female Athlete: Brittney Griner, Basketball
- Best Male Athlete: LeBron James, Basketball
- Best Team: Miami Heat
- Best Coach/Manager: Tom Coughlin, New York Giants
- Best Comeback: Matthew Stafford
- Best Game -– San Francisco 49ers vs. New Orleans Saints
- Best Moment -- Tim Tebow's 80-yard touchdown pass
- Best Play -- Christian Watford's buzzer-beating shot to beat No. 1 Kentucky
- Best Upset -— Los Angeles Kings as the 8th seed winning the Stanley Cup
- College Athletic Program—Stanford women's athletics and Florida men's athletics
- Best International Athlete -- Lionel Messi
- Best Record-Breaking Performance -- Drew Brees, New Orleans Saints
- Breakthrough Athlete of the Year -- Jeremy Lin, New York Knicks
- Best Male Action Sports Athlete -- Shaun White, Skateboarding-Snowboarding
- Best Female Action Sports Athlete -- Jamie Anderson, Snowboarding
- Best Male Athlete with a Disability -- Kyle Maynard, Climbing
- Best Female Athlete with a Disability -- Jessica Long, Swimming
- Best Driver -- Tony Stewart
- Fighter of the Year -- Floyd Mayweather Jr.
- NBA Player of the Year -- LeBron James, Miami Heat
- NFL Player of the Year -- Aaron Rodgers, Green Bay Packers
- NHL Player of the Year -- Jonathan Quick, Los Angeles Kings
- MLB Player of the Year -- Josh Hamilton, Texas Rangers
- WNBA Player of the Year -- Diana Taurasi, Phoenix Mercury
- Best Bowler -- Sean Rash
- Best Female Golfer -- Cristie Kerr
- Best Male Golfer -- Bubba Watson
- Best Jockey -- Mario Gutierrez
- Best MLS Player -- David Beckham, Los Angeles Galaxy
- Best Male Tennis Player -- Novak Djokovic
- Best Female Tennis Player -- Maria Sharapova

== In Memoriam ==
- Junior Seau
- Dave Gavitt
- Joe Paterno
- Bubba Smith
- Al Davis
- Chester McGlockton
- Myra Kraft
- Orlando Woolridge
- Gary Carter
- Mike Flanagan
- Moose Skowron
- Giorgio Chinaglia
- Don Carter
- Pavol Demitra
- Joe Frazier
- Sócrates
- Angelo Dundee
- Alketas Panagoulias
- Bert Sugar
- Sarah Burke
- Dan Wheldon
