= 2011 ESPY Awards =

Athletic awards show

The 19th ESPY Awards were held on July 13, 2011, at the Nokia Theatre, hosted by Seth Meyers. ESPY Award is short for Excellence in Sports Performance Yearly Award.

== Categories ==
There are 33 categories. The winners are listed first in bold. Other nominees are in alphabetical order.

Best Male Athlete	Best Female Athlete
Jimmie Johnson, NASCAR; Rafael Nadal, Tennis; **Dirk Nowitzki**, NBA; Aaron Rodgers NFL; Jimmer Fredette, NCAA basketball	Kelly Clark, Snowboarding; Lauren Jackson, WNBA; Maya Moore, NCAA basketball; **Lindsey Vonn**, Alpine skiing
Best Championship Performance	Best Breakthrough Athlete
Tim Lincecum, 2010 MLB Postseason; **Tim Thomas, Stanley Cup Finals**; Kemba Walker, Big East tournament and NCAA Tournament; Serena Williams, 2010 Wimbledon	José Bautista, Toronto Blue Jays; Arian Foster, Houston Texans; **Blake Griffin**, Los Angeles Clippers; Li Na, Tennis; Cam Newton, Auburn Tigers football
Best Record Breaking Performance	Best Upset
Ray Allen, NBA 3-point record; **Rory McIlroy**, Lowest score in U.S Open history; Derrick Rose, Youngest player to win NBA MVP; UConn Women's Basketball, Longest win streak in NCAA Division I history	Blame over Zenyatta, Breeders' Cup Classic; Fabrício Werdum stuns Fedor Emelianenko, MMA; Seattle Seahawks upset New Orleans Saints, NFL Wild Card Playoffs; **VCU Rams upset Kansas Jayhawks**, NCAA men's basketball tournament
Best Game	Best Moment
Auburn beats Alabama, Iron Bowl; Butler upsets Pittsburgh, NCAA men's basketball tournament; **Eagles rally to beat the Giants**, NFL; Oklahoma City edges Memphis in 3OT, NBA Playoffs	Fennville HS Basketball Team, High school basketball tournament run; **Roy Halladay Postseason No-Hitter**, MLB; Trevor Bayne at Daytona 500, NASCAR

== In Memoriam ==
- Seve Ballesteros
- Lorenzen Wright
- Andy Irons
- Lorenzo Charles
- John Henry Johnson
- Andy Robustelli
- Robert Traylor
- Dave Duerson
- Ron Santo
- Maurice Lucas
- Grete Waitz
- Bud Greenspan
- Jack Tatum
- Derek Boogard
- Jack LaLanne
- Nick Charles
- Bobby Thomson
- Pat Burns
- Dick Williams
- George Blanda
- Don Meredith
- John Mackey
- Bob Feller
- Duke Snider
- Harmon Killebrew
- Sparky Anderson

== See also ==
- Best Male College Athlete ESPY Award
- Best Female College Athlete ESPY Award
