= 2020 ESPY Awards =

Athletic awards show

- Date: June 21, 2020
- Hosted by: Sue Bird; Megan Rapinoe; Russell Wilson

Television/radio coverage
- Network: ESPN
- Runtime: 120 minutes

The 2020 ESPY Awards were presented at the 28th annual ESPY Awards show, held on June 21, 2020, and broadcast on television nationwide in the United States on ESPN at 9 PM Eastern/8 PM Central. Sue Bird, Megan Rapinoe and Russell Wilson served as hosts.

Due to the COVID-19 pandemic the event was hosted remotely. Instead of presenting traditional awards for athletic achievement during the event, awards were presented to honor extraordinary acts of activism and humanitarian efforts.

== Winners and nominees ==
Muhammad Ali Sports Humanitarian Award: Nelson Cruz – Minnesota Twins; Kevin Love – Cleveland Cavaliers; Devin and Jason McCourty – New England Patriots; Maya Moore – Minnesota Lynx; Titus O'Neil – WWE	Sports Humanitarian Team of the Year: Los Angeles Dodgers; Denver Broncos; New York City FC; Sacramento Kings
Corporate Community Impact Award: Burton Snowboards; Anthem Foundation; Nike; Peach Bowl	Can't-Stop-Watching Moment: Jackson State manager Thomas "Snacks" Lee drills 3-point shot; Riley Sartain-Vaughn bat flip; Newtown wins title on anniversary of Sandy Hook shooting; Obed Lekhehle high jump

== Honorary awards ==
Arthur Ashe Award for Courage

- Kevin Love

Jimmy V Award

- Taquarius Wair

Muhammad Ali Sports Humanitarian Award

- Nelson Cruz

Pat Tillman Award for Service

- Kim Clavel

Stuart Scott ENSPIRE Award

- WNBA and WNBA Players Association

== Tribute ==
The show made a tribute to former NBA superstar Kobe Bryant, who died in a helicopter crash on January 26, 2020, along with eight others, including his 13-year-old daughter, Gianna. The tribute was narrated by rapper Snoop Dogg.
