= Best Female Action Sports Athlete ESPY Award =

Annual athletic award

- Awarded for: best female action sports athlete
- Country: United States
- Presented by: ESPN
- First award: 2004
- Currently held by: Eileen Gu (China)
- Website: www.espn.co.uk/espys/

The Best Female Action Sports Athlete ESPY Award is an annual award honoring the achievements of a female athlete from the world of action sports. It was first awarded as part of the ESPY Awards in 2004 after the non-gender-specific Best Action Sports Athlete ESPY Award was presented the previous two years (with the American snowboarder Kelly Clark receiving the 2002 award). It is given to the female, irrespective of nationality or sport contested, adjudged to be the best action sports athlete in a given calendar year. Balloting for the award is undertaken by fans over the Internet from between three and five choices selected by the ESPN Select Nominating Committee, which is composed of a panel of experts. It is conferred in July to reflect performance and achievement over the preceding twelve months.

The inaugural winner of the award was the American wakeboarder Dallas Friday. During 2003 and 2004, Friday won 12 of the available 14 professional women's titles, including national and world championships. She became the first wakeboarder to be nominated for, and hence to win, an ESPY Award. Athletes from the United States have won more times than any other nationality with ten (three times to snowboarders Jamie Anderson and Chloe Kim), followed by Australians with three, two of which went to the surfer Stephanie Gilmore. Snowboarders are most successful sportspeople, with eleven awards, followed by surfers with four. It was not awarded in 2020 due to the COVID-19 pandemic. The most recent winner of the award was Chinese freestyle skier Eileen Gu in 2022.

== Winners ==
Best Female Action Sports Athlete ESPY Award winners and nominees
Year	Image	Athlete	Nation of citizenship	Sport(s) regularly contested	Nominees	Refs
2004	–	Dallas Friday	United States	Wakeboarding	Layne Beachley (AUS) – Surfing; Aleisha Cline (CAN) – Ski cross Hannah Teter (USA) – Snowboarding	
2005	Sofia Mulanovich in 2007	Sofía Mulánovich	Peru	Surfing	Karin Huttary (AUT) – Ski cross Janna Meyen (USA) – Snowboarding; Hannah Teter (USA) – Snowboarding	
2006	Hannah Teter in 2005	Hannah Teter	United States	Snowboarding (half-pipe)	Gretchen Bleiler (USA) – Snowboarding; Cara-Beth Burnside (USA) – Skateboarding; Dallas Friday (USA) – Wakeboarding; Janna Meyen (USA) – Snowboarding	
2007	Sarah Burke in 2010	Sarah Burke	Canada	Freestyle skiing	Jamie Anderson (USA) – Snowboarding; Layne Beachley (AUS) – Surfing; Torah Bright (USA) – Snowboarding; Elissa Steamer (USA) – Skateboarding	
2008	Gretchen Bleiler in 2010	Gretchen Bleiler	United States	Snowboarding (half-pipe, slopestyle)	Stephanie Gilmore (AUS) – Surfing; Lindsey Jacobellis (USA) – Snowboarding; Jessica Patterson (USA) – Motocross	
2009	Maya Gabeira in 2014	Maya Gabeira	Brazil	Surfing	Torah Bright (USA) – Snowboarding; Sarah Burke (CAN) – Freestyle skiing Ashley Fiolek (USA) – Motocross	
2010	Torah Bright in 2010	Torah Bright	Australia	Snowboarding (half-pipe)	Ashley Fiolek (USA) – Motocross; Stephanie Gilmore (AUS) – Surfing; Jen Hudak (USA) – Freestyle skiing Ashleigh McIvor (CAN) – Freestyle skiing	
2011	Stephanie Gilmore in 2008	Stephanie Gilmore	Australia	Surfing	Sarah Burke (CAN) – Freestyle skiing Kelly Clark (USA) – Snowboarding; Ashley Fiolek (USA) – Motocross	
2012	Jamie Anderson in 2013	Jamie Anderson	United States	Snowboarding (slopestyle)	Kelly Clark (USA) – Snowboarding; Carissa Moore (USA) – Surfing; Kaya Turski (CAN) – Freestyle skiing	
2013	Stephanie Gilmore in 2008	Stephanie Gilmore	Australia	Surfing	Letícia Bufoni (BRA) – Skateboarding; Kelly Clark (USA) – Snowboarding; Laia Sanz (ESP) – Motocross	
2014	Jamie Anderson in 2014	Jamie Anderson	United States	Snowboarding (slopestyle)	Maddie Bowman (USA) – Freestyle skiing Kelly Clark (USA) – Snowboarding; Vicki Golden (USA) – Motocross; Carissa Moore (USA) – Surfing	
2015	Kelly Clark in 2010	Kelly Clark	United States	Snowboarding (half-pipe)	Paige Alms (USA) – Surfing; Stephanie Gilmore (AUS) – Surfing; Laia Sanz (ESP) – Motocross	
2016	Jamie Anderson in 2014	Jamie Anderson	United States	Snowboarding (slopestyle)	Keala Kennelly (USA) – Surfing; Chloe Kim (USA) – Snowboarding; Carissa Moore (USA) – Surfing	
2017	Anna Gasser in 2017	Anna Gasser	Austria	Snowboarding (slopestyle)	Lacey Baker (USA) – Skateboarding; Kelly Sildaru (EST) – Freestyle skiing Tyler Wright (AUS) – Surfing	
2018	Chloe Kim in 2017	Chloe Kim	United States	Snowboarding (slopestyle)	Jamie Anderson (USA) – Snowboarding; Stephanie Gilmore (AUS) – Surfing; Brighton Zeuner (USA) – Skateboarding	
2019	Chloe Kim in 2017	Chloe Kim	United States	Snowboarding (slopestyle)	Kelly Sildaru (EST) – Skiing; Zoi Sadowski-Synnott (NZL) – Snowboarding; Stephanie Gilmore (AUS} Surfing	
2020	Not awarded due to the COVID-19 pandemic					
2021	Chloe Kim in 2017	Chloe Kim	United States	Snowboarding (slopestyle)	Eileen Gu (CHN) – Skiing; Carissa Moore (USA) – Surfing; Zoi Sadowski-Synnott (NZL) – Snowboarding	
2022	Gu in 2020	Eileen Gu	China	Freestyle skiing	Chloe Kim (USA) – Snowboarding; Rayssa Leal (BRA) – Skateboarding; Zoi Sadowski-Synnott (NZL – Snowboarding	

== See also ==
- List of sports awards honoring women
- Best Male Action Sports Athlete ESPY Award
- Laureus World Sports Award for Action Sportsperson of the Year
