= Best Female Athlete with a Disability ESPY Award =

Annual athletic award

- Awarded for: best disabled female athlete
- Country: United States
- Presented by: ESPN
- First award: 2005
- Currently held by: Jessica Long (USA)
- Website: www.espn.co.uk/espys/

The Best Female Athlete with a Disability ESPY Award is an annual award honoring the achievements of a female individual from the community of disabled sports. Established with the aid of disability advocate and former United States Paralympic soccer player Eli Wolff, the accolade's trophy, designed by sculptor Lawrence Nowlan, is presented to the disabled sportswomen adjudged to be the best at the annual ESPY Awards ceremony in Los Angeles. The Best Female Athlete with a Disability ESPY Award was first bestowed as part of the ESPY Awards in 2005 after the non-gender specific Best Athlete with a Disability ESPY Award was presented the previous three years (all won by sportsmen). Balloting for the award is undertaken by fans over the Internet from between three and five choices selected by the ESPN Select Nominating Committee, which is composed of a panel of experts. It is conferred in July to reflect performance and achievement over the preceding twelve months.

The inaugural winner of the Best Female Athlete with a Disability ESPY Award at the 2005 ceremony was an American swimmer named Erin Popovich, who is affected by achondroplasia. She won seven gold medals at the 2004 Summer Paralympics in Athens. She is one of three people to have won the Best Female Athlete with a Disability ESPY Award more than once, winning again at the 2009 awards. Fellow swimmer Jessica Long has the most victories of any other sportswoman, collecting the award four times at the 2007, 2012, 2013 and 2022 ESPY Awards, with one further nomination at the 2009 ESPY Awards, while cross-country skier Oksana Masters has been nominated the most times (eight) without winning. Swimmers have been successful at the awards with nine victories and 13 nominations, followed by paratriathles with three wins and nine nominations. It was not awarded in 2020 due to the COVID-19 pandemic. The incumbent holder is American paralympic swimmer Jessica Long after being announced as the winner at the 2022 ESPY Awards.

== Winners and nominees ==
Key
*	Indicates individual whose nomination was withdrawn

Best Female Athlete with a Disability ESPY Award winners and nominees
Year	Image	Athlete	Nationality	Sport	Nominees	Refs
2005	–	Erin Popovich	United States	Swimming	Cheri Blauwet (USA) – Wheelchair racing Katie Compton (USA) – Cycling; Karissa Whitsell (USA) – Cycling	
2006	Sarah Reinersten wearing blue-tinted sunglasses on top of her head and smiling widely	Sarah Reinertsen	United States	Triathlon	Rachael Scdoris (USA) – Sled dog racing Laurie Stephens (USA) – Alpine skiing	
2007	Television screenshot of Jessica Long wearing a purple T-shirt	Jessica Long	United States	Swimming	Amy Palmiero-Winters (USA) – Triathlon; Esther Vergeer (NED) – Wheelchair tennis Stephani Victor (USA) – Alpine skiing	
2008	–	Shay Oberg	United States	Softball	Patty Cisneros (USA) – Wheelchair basketball Jessica Galli (USA) – Wheelchair racing Susan Beth Scott (USA) – Swimming	
2009	–	Erin Popovich	United States	Swimming	Jessica Long (USA) – Swimming; Maureen McKinnon-Tucker (USA) – Yachting; Asya Miller (USA) – Goalball	
2010	–	Amy Palmiero-Winters	United States	Triathlon	Linnea Dohring (USA) – Gymnastics; Alana Nichols (USA) – Wheelchair basketball Stephani Victor (USA) – Alpine skiing	
2011	Mallory Weggemann smiling at the camera	Mallory Weggemann	United States	Swimming	Allison Jones (USA) – Cycling; Tatyana McFadden (USA) – Wheelchair racing Alana Nichols (USA) – Alpine skiing Melissa Stockwell (USA) – Triathlon	
2012	Television screenshot of Jessica Long being interviewed	Jessica Long	United States	Swimming	Chelsea McClammer (USA) – Track and field Tatyana McFadden USA) – Wheelchair racing Alana Nichols (USA) – Alpine skiing Melissa Stockwell (USA) – Triathlon	
2013	Jessica Long wearing black swimming googles and a purple costume	Jessica Long	United States	Swimming	Victoria Arlen (USA) – Swimming; Marianna Davis (USA) – Cycling; Tatyana McFadden (USA) – Wheelchair racing Shirley Reilly (USA) – Wheelchair racing	
2014	–	Jamie Whitmore	United States	Cycling	Minda Dentler (USA) – Triathlon; Oksana Masters (USA) – Cross-country skiing Tatyana McFadden (USA) – Wheelchair racing Laurie Stephens (USA) – Alpine skiing	
2015	–	Rebecca Meyers	United States	Swimming	Kendall Gretsch (USA) – Triathlon; Oksana Masters (USA) – Cross-country skiing Tatyana McFadden (USA) – Wheelchair racing Greta Neimanas (USA) – Cycling	
2016	Tatyana McFadden competing in a wheelchair racing event	Tatyana McFadden	United States	Wheelchair racing	Heather Erickson (USA) – Volleyball; Bethany Hamilton* (USA) – Surfing (Note: Hamilton stated to Seven News in November 2016 that she asked for the withdrawal of her nomination due to its wording since she sees herself as "adaptive" rather than "disabled".); Oksana Masters (USA) – Cross-country skiing Shawn Morelli (USA) – Cycling	
2017	–	Rebecca Meyers	United States	Swimming	Oksana Masters (USA) – Cross-country skiing Tatyana McFadden (USA) – Wheelchair racing Shawn Morelli (USA) – Cycling; Grace Norman (USA) – Triathlon	
2018	–	Brenna Huckaby	United States	Snowboarding	Kendall Gretsch (USA) – Cross-country skiing Oksana Masters (USA) – Cross-country skiing Tatyana McFadden (USA) – Wheelchair racing	
2019	A woman in a swimsuit displays a large banner in a bright, sunny environment, celebrating victory in a sporting event	Allysa Seely	United States	Triathlon	Oksana Masters (USA) – Cross-country skiing Tatyana McFadden (USA) – Wheelchair racing Shawn Morelli (USA) – Cycling	
2020	Not awarded due to the COVID-19 pandemic					
2021	–	Rebecca Murray	United States	Wheelchair basketball	Sam Bosco (USA) – Cycling; Oksana Masters (USA) – Cycling; Leanne Smith (USA) – Swimming	
2022	Jessica Long with her right arm under her blonde hair	Jessica Long	United States	Swimming	Oksana Masters (USA) – Biathlon/cycling; Brenna Huckaby (USA) – Snowboarding; Kate Ward (USA) – Soccer	

== Statistics ==
Multiple winners and nominees
Name	Wins	Nominations
Jessica Long	4	5
Rebecca Meyers	2	2
Erin Popovich	2	2
Tatyana McFadden	1	9
Amy Palmiero-Winters	1	2
Oksana Masters	0	8
Alana Nichols	0	3
Shawn Morelli	0	2
Laurie Stephens	0	2
Melissa Stockwell	0	2
Stephani Victor	0	2

Winners and nominees by sport
Sport	Winners	Nominations
Swimming	9	13
Triathlon	3	9
Wheelchair racing	1	12
Cycling	1	13
Wheelchair basketball	1	2
Snowboarding	1	2
Softball	1	0
Alpine skiing	0	6
Cross-country skiing	0	7
Biathlon	0	1
Goalball	0	1
Gymnastics	0	1
Sled dog racing	0	1
Soccer	0	1
Track and field	0	1
Volleyball	0	1
Yachting	0	1

== See also ==
- List of sports awards honoring women
- Best Male Athlete with a Disability ESPY Award
- United States Olympic Committee Paralympian of the Year Award
- Laureus World Sports Award for Sportsperson of the Year with a Disability
