= Best Male Athlete with a Disability ESPY Award =

Annual athletic award

- Awarded for: best disabled male athlete
- Country: United States
- Presented by: ESPN
- First award: 2005
- Currently held by: Brad Snyder (USA)
- Website: www.espn.com/espys/

The Best Male Athlete with a Disability ESPY Award is an annual award honoring the achievements of a male individual from the world of disabled sports. Established with the aid of disability advocate and former United States Paralympic soccer player Eli Wolff, the accolade's trophy, designed by sculptor Lawrence Nowlan, is presented to the disabled sportsman adjudged to be the best at the annual ESPY Awards ceremony in Los Angeles. The Best Male Athlete with a Disability ESPY Award was first bestowed as part of the ESPY Awards in 2005 after the non-gender specific Best Athlete with a Disability ESPY Award was presented the previous three years (all won by sportsmen). Balloting for the award is undertaken by fans over the Internet from between three and five choices selected by the ESPN Select Nominating Committee, which is composed of a panel of experts. It is conferred in July to reflect performance and achievement over the preceding twelve months.

The inaugural winner of the Best Male Athlete with a Disability ESPY Award in 2005 which was won by Paralympic track and field competitor Marlon Shirley, who won two medals at the 2004 Summer Paralympics and was the first para-athlete to go below eleven seconds in the men's 100-meter category with a time of 10.97 seconds. In 2015, South African wheelchair racer Krige Schabort was selected as the recipient of the award. As of 2018, he is the only athlete born outside of the United States to have won the accolade, though three additional foreign sportsmen have since earned nominations. Track and field athletes have won more awards than any other sport with four with three triathlon winners and two winners each coming in sledge hockey, mixed martial arts, and wrestling. It was not awarded in 2020 due to the COVID-19 pandemic. The most recent winner of the award was American para-swimmer Brad Snyder in 2022.

== Winners and nominees ==
Best Male Athlete with a Disability ESPY Award winners and nominees
Year	Image	Athlete	Nationality	Sport	Nominees	Refs
2005	–	Marlon Shirley	United States	Paralympic track and field	Rudy Garcia-Tolson (USA) – Swimming; Paul Martin (USA) – Cycling	
2006	–	Bobby Martin	United States	American football	Steve Cook (USA) – Cross-country skiing Anthony Robles (USA) – Wrestling	
2007	Casey Tibbs wearing a U.S. Navy Sailors uniform	Casey Tibbs	United States	Paralympic track and field	Robin Ammerlaan (NED) – Wheelchair tennis Josh George (USA) – Paralympic track and field Krige Schabort (RSA) – Wheelchair racing	
2008	–	Ryan Kocer	United States	Wrestling	Philip Scholz (USA) – Swimming; Matt Scott (USA) – Wheelchair basketball Marthell Vazquez (USA) – Soccer	
2009	Jason Lester is wearing a black cycling helmet with overall and is mounted on a black bicycle	Jason P. Lester	United States	Triathlon	Jeremy Campbell (USA) – Paralympic track and field Will Groulx (USA – Wheelchair rugby Oscar Pistorius (RSA) – Paralympic track and field	
2010	Steve Cash, wearing red, blue and white sports overalls	Steve Cash	United States	Sledge hockey	Rudy Garcia-Tolson (USA) – Triathlon; Andy Soule (USA) – Cross-country skiing	
2011	–	Anthony Robles	United States	Wrestling	Chris Devlin-Young (USA) – Alpine skiing Aaron Scheidies (USA) – Triathlon; Jerome Singleton (USA) – Paralympic track and field Steve Wampler (USA) – Climbing	
2012	Kyle Maynard wearing an orange T-shirt and a black backpack	Kyle Maynard	United States	Mixed martial arts	Baxter Humby (CAN) – Mixed martial arts Raymond Martin (USA) – Wheelchair racing Oz Sanchez (USA – Cycling; Tyler Walker (USA) – Alpine skiing	
2013	–	Jeremy Campbell	United States	Paralympic track and field	Jeff Fabry (USA) – Archery; Raymond Martin (USA) – Wheelchair racing Brad Snyder (USA) – Swimming; Tyler Walker (USA) – Alpine skiing	
2014	Declan Farmer, wearing a black hockey helmet and red sporting overalls	Declan Farmer	United States	Sledge hockey	Mark Bathum (USA) – Alpine skiing Raymond Martin (USA) – Wheelchair racing Mike Shea (USA) – Snowboarding; Evan Strong (USA) – Boardercross	
2015	–	Krige Schabort	South Africa	Wheelchair racing	Joseph Berenyi (USA – Cycling; Josh Pauls (USA) – Sledge hockey Mike Shea (USA) – Snowboarding; Andy Soule (USA) – Cross-country skiing	
2016	Richard Browne, wearing a black T-shirt with sponsors logos and a black backpack	Richard Browne	United States	Paralympic track and field	Joseph Berenyi (USA) – Cycling; Aaron Fotheringham (USA) – Skateboarding/BMX; Nikko Landeros (USA) – Sledge hockey Brad Snyder (USA) – Swimming	
2017	Steve Serio playing wheelchair basketball in 2011	Steve Serio	United States	Wheelchair basketball	Will Groulx (USA) – Cycling; Mike Minor (USA) – Snowboarding; Brad Snyder (USA) – Swimming; Roderick Townsend-Roberts (USA) – Paralympic track and field	
2018	–	Mike Schultz	United States	Snowboarding	Daniel Cnossen (USA) – Biathlon; Declan Farmer (USA) – Sledge hockey Andrew Kurka (USA) – Alpine skiing	
2019	–	Mark Barr	United States	Triathlon	Declan Farmer (USA) – Sledge hockey Daniel Romanchuk (USA) – Marathon; Oz Sanchez (USA) – Cycling	
2020	Not awarded due to the COVID-19 pandemic					
2021	–	Chris Nikic	United States	Triathlon	Evan Austin (USA) – Swimming; Jesse Billauer (USA) – Surfing; Keith Gabel (USA) – Snowboarding	
2022	A photographic portrait of Brad Snyder smiling at the camera	Brad Snyder	United States	Triathlon and swimming	Declan Farmer (USA) – Sledge hockey Nick Mayhugh (USA) – Paralympic track and field Ian Seidenfeld (USA) – Para table tennis	

== Statistics ==
Multiple winners and nominees
Name	Wins	Nominations
Jeremy Campbell	1	2
Anthony Robles	1	2
Declan Farmer	1	4
Krige Schabort	1	2
Mark Barr	1	1
Raymond Martin	0	3
Brad Snyder	0	3
Joseph Berenyi	0	2
Rudy Garcia-Tolson	0	2
Will Groulx	0	2
Mike Shea	0	2
Andy Soule	0	2
Tyler Walker	0	2

Winners by sport
Sport	Winners	Nominations
Paralympic track and field	4	10
Triathlon	4	5
Sledge hockey	2	7
Mixed martial arts	2	3
Wrestling	2	3
Swimming	1	6
Snowboarding	1	5
Wheelchair racing	1	5
Wheelchair basketball	1	2
American football	1	1
Alpine skiing	0	5
Cycling	0	6
Cross-country skiing	0	3
Archery	0	1
Biathlon	0	1
Boardercross	0	1
Marathon	0	1
Soccer	0	1
Surfing	0	1
Table tennis	0	1
Wheelchair rugby	0	1
Wheelchair tennis	0	1

== See also ==
- Best Female Athlete with a Disability ESPY Award
- United States Olympic Committee Paralympian of the Year Award
- Laureus World Sports Award for Sportsperson of the Year with a Disability
