= Paul Martin (disambiguation) =

Paul Martin (born 1938) is a former Canadian prime minister.

Paul Martin may also refer to:

== Politics ==
- Paul Martin Sr. (1903–1992), father of the above, Canadian politician
- Paul Martin (Scottish politician) (born 1967), member of the Scottish Parliament
- Paul Martin (civil servant), government of Jersey chief executive officer (March 2021-22)
- Paul Martin (Vermont politician), member of the Vermont House of Representatives

== Science ==
- Paul R. Martin (1946–2009), American psychologist, director of Wellspring Retreat and Resource Center in Ohio
- Paul Schultz Martin (1928–2010), American geobiologist at the University of Arizona
- Paul Sidney Martin (1898–1974), American archaeologist

== Sports ==
- Paul Martin (Swiss athlete) (1901–1987), Swiss runner in the 1924 Summer Olympics
- Paul Martin (Australian footballer) (1964–2019), Australian rules footballer for South Adelaide
- Paul Martin (bobsleigh), German bobsledder at the 1928 Winter Olympics
- Paul Martin (ice hockey) (born 1981), American National Hockey League player
- Paul Martin (baseball) (1932–2011), American Major League Baseball player
- Paul Martin (Scottish footballer) (born 1965), Scottish association football player and coach
- Paul Martin (wrestler) (1949–2021), American wrestler better known as Paul Orndorff or Mr. Wonderful
- Paul Martin (amputee athlete) (born 1967), American world-record holding Paralympian and triathlete
- Paul Martin (rugby league) (born 1967), rugby league player for Canberra Raiders
- Paul Martin (water polo) (born 1982), South African water polo coach at the 2020 Summer Olympics

== Entertainment ==
- Paul Martin, singer in American country band Marshall Dyllon (active 2000–2011)
- Paul Martin (All My Children), a fictional character on ABC soap opera All My Children (appeared 1970–1995)
- Paul Martin (TV presenter) (born 1959), presenter of the BBC antiques programme Flog It!
- Paul Martin, real name of British comedian Paul Merton (born 1957)
- Paul Martin (radio presenter), DJ on New Zealand radio station The Rock
- Paul Martin (director) (1899–1967), Hungarian film director
- Paul Martin, a fictional character on the long-running television series, Lassie (appeared 1957–1964)

== Other ==
- Paul Elliott Martin (1897–1975), American bishop of the Methodist Church
- Paul K. Martin, American lawyer and NASA Inspector General
- Paul Marius Martin (born 1940), French Latinist and historian of ancient Rome
- Paul Martin (illustrator) (1883–1932), American cover artist for Collier's magazine
- Paul Martin (Irish journalist) (born 1977), Irish journalist
- Paul Martin (bishop) (born 1967), New Zealand Roman Catholic bishop
- Paul Martin (photographer) (1864–1944), French-born British photographer

== See also ==
- Paul Gallocher de Lagalisserie (Paul Martin Philémon, 1805–1871), French engineer
