= Palmiero =

Palmiero is an Italian surname. Notable people with the surname include:

- Amy Palmiero-Winters (born 1972), American below-knee amputee athlete
- Luca Palmiero (born 1996), Italian footballer

== See also ==
- Palmieri
