= Paulo Martins =

Paulo Martins may refer to:

- Paulo Martins (wrestler) (born 1970), Portuguese wrestler
- Paulo Eduardo Martins (born 1981), Brazilian journalist and politician
- Paulo Egydio Martins, Brazilian businessman and politician
- Paulo Martins (footballer, born 1960), Paulo Martins Fernandes, Brazilian footballer
- Paulo Martins (footballer, born 1991), Paulo César da Silva Martins, Brazilian-born East Timorese footballer

== See also ==
- Paul Martin (disambiguation)
