= 2008 ESPY Awards =

Athletic awards show

The 2008 ESPY Awards were hosted by Justin Timberlake at Peacock Theater, Los Angeles:

== Winners ==
=== Special awards ===
- Arthur Ashe Courage Award – John Carlos and Tommie Smith
- Jimmy V Award for Perseverance – Kevin Everett
- Best Comeback – Josh Hamilton

=== Best in sport ===
- Best Female Athlete – Candace Parker
- Best Male Athlete – Tiger Woods
- Best Moment – Central Washington and Western Oregon sportsmanship
- Best Team – Boston Celtics
- Best Coach/Manager – Pat Summitt
- Best Game – New York Giants defeat New England Patriots in Super Bowl XLII
- Best Championship Performance – Tiger Woods
- Best Play – Eli Manning to David Tyree pass in Super Bowl XLII
- Best Finish – Western Kentucky defeat Drake on Ty Rogers buzzer beater
- Best Upset – New York Giants defeat New England Patriots in Super Bowl XLII
- Best Breakthrough Athlete – Adrian Peterson
- Best Record-Breaking Performance – Brett Favre
- Best Sports Movie – Semi-Pro
- Best Male College Athlete – Tim Tebow
- Best Female College Athlete – Candace Parker
- Best Male Athlete with a Disability – Ryan Kocer
- Best Female Athlete with a Disability – Shay Oberg
- Best International Male Athlete – Rafael Nadal
- Best International Female Athlete – Lorena Ochoa

=== Individual sports ===
- Best Baseball Player – Alex Rodriguez
- Best NBA Player – Kobe Bryant
- Best WNBA Player – Lauren Jackson
- Best NFL Player – Tom Brady
- Best NHL Player – Sidney Crosby
- Best MLS Player – David Beckham
- Best Male Action Sports Athlete – Shaun White
- Best Female Action Sports Athlete – Gretchen Bleiler
- Best Bowler – Norm Duke
- Best Driver – Jimmie Johnson
- Best Fighter – Floyd Mayweather
- Best Golfer – Tiger Woods
- Best Jockey – Kent Desormeaux
- Best Outdoor Athlete – Scott Smiley
- Best Male Tennis Player – Roger Federer
- Best Female Tennis Player – Maria Sharapova
- Best Track and Field Athlete – Tyson Gay

=== Sponsored awards ===
- Hummer "Like Nothing Else" Award – George Martin
- Under Armour Undeniable Moment – Warner Robins defeats Tokyo to win Little League World Series on Dalton Carriker walk-off home run
