= Caroline Ryder =

Caroline Ryder (born November 12, 1980) is a writer based in Los Angeles, California, known for her work with LA Weekly, Dazed magazine and the Los Angeles Times and for co-authoring Dirty Rocker Boys, named among the "50 greatest rock memoirs of all time" by Rolling Stone magazine.

== Journalism ==
Born to an Irish father and a Brazilian mother in Madrid, Spain, she was raised in London, England, and educated at Haberdashers' Aske's School for Girls in Elstree. She graduated from the London School of Economics and worked at MTV Europe and Warner Music before moving to Los Angeles in 2005. After meeting street artist Shepard Fairey at a nightclub in Hollywood, she became an editor for his magazine Swindle, interviewing members of the IRA for a cover article on pro-terrorism murals, as well as Black Panther Bobby Seale, actress Pam Grier, porn publisher Larry Flynt, singer Nancy Sinatra and filmmaker Larry Clark.

Known for her coverage of the LA indie music and fashion scenes, she became one of the LA Weekly's first fashion bloggers. In 2007, she was hired by the Los Angeles Times to act as style editor of their youth culture portal, Metromix. She was named style editor of Variety until being laid off in 2008.

In 2010, Odd Future granted Ryder their first print interview, which was published in the LA Weekly.

In 2012, she became a columnist for KCET's Artbound.

In 2015, she conducted the first solo interview with Yolandi Visser of Die Antwoord for Dazed magazine.

== Books ==
- Co-author of the 2015 Gwar biography Let There Be Gwar.
- Co-authored the Sunset Strip memoir Dirty Rocker Boys and, "Cherry on Top: Flirty, Forty-Something, and Funny as F*ck," alongside Bobbie Brown.
- Co-author of Kicking Up Dirt with X Games champion Ashley Fiolek.

== Film ==
In 2013, it was announced that Sony Films was developing an adaptation of Kicking Up Dirt.

Her feature script Mimi and Ulrich, written under the mentorship of Mary Sweeney and Udo Kier, was shortlisted for the 2015 Sundance Screenwriting Lab.

She is a graduate of USC's School of Cinematic Arts, where she earned her MFA in Writing for Screen and Television.
