= Vinny Lauwers =

Australian round-the-world yachtsman (born 1967)

Vincent Marc Thierry Lauwers (born 12 September 1967) is an Australian round-the-world yachtsman. In 2000 he became the first paraplegic sailor to sail solo, non-stop around the world. In 2001, he won the Laureus Award for "Sportsperson of the Year with a Disability".

== Early life ==
Vinny Lauwers was born in Belgium on 12 September 1967 and emigrated to Australia at the age of four. Vinny Lauwers' early childhood was marked by psychological abuse. He first experienced ocean sailing aged 14, crewing on a yacht from Melbourne to Sydney. He became a paraplegic in 1990 when he was 22; Lauwers' back was broken in three places after he was hit by a car while riding a motorcycle.

Before his circumnavigation, Lauwers gained extra experience in the Melbourne to Osaka Yacht Race, a non-stop south-to-north, double-handed race, covering a 5500-nautical-mile (10,186 km) course between the two sister cities and also sailing in two Sydney to Hobart Yacht Races with the Sailors with Disability (SWD) crew, including SWD's first entry in 1994.

== Circumnavigation ==
Lauwers spent seven years planning his voyage and building his yacht, a Van de Stadt–designed 47 named Vision Quest.

He was instructed for two years on the synoptics of the Southern Hemisphere by meteorologist Bob Leighton, who, together with colleagues from the Australian Bureau of Meteorology's National Meteorological Operations Centre, also provided regular forecasts during Lauwers' journey.

His circumnavigation attempt commenced on 20 December 1999 from Port Phillip Bay in Melbourne, Australia. During his voyage, he encountered many hardships. Equipment problems included autopilot malfunctions, failed radar, and a self-destructing wind generator.

The voyage took seven and a half months, finishing on 9 August 2000. Welcome celebrations were planned for Lauwers to finish his voyage on Saturday 12 August, but with a gale developing in Bass Strait, he decided to enter the Bay and cross the official finish line on the 9th. He anchored and stayed on board until continuing on to the Williamstown Pier and planned celebrations. His official welcome home at the Royal Yacht Club of Victoria was attended by over a thousand people, including Premier Steve Bracks. Vision Quest's World Sailing Speed Record Council's Performance Certificate lists its route time as 233 days 13 hours 43 minutes and 8 seconds and the distance covered as 21,760 nautical miles (41,300 km).

As of 2024, the yacht interior has been improved for comfort, replete with air conditioning and new equipment, and she has been listed for sale at A$175,000.

== Honours ==
On 15 August 2000, Lauwers and his feat were recognised in the Australian Parliament. He was awarded the Australian Sports Medal in July 2000 and in January 2001, the Australian Centenary Medal "for outstanding service as the first paraplegic sailor to sail around the world unassisted".

In 2000 Lauwers was nominated for the International Sailing Federation (ISAF) World Sailor of the Year Awards. Lauwers was Australian Sailing's Sailor of the Year with a Disability for 2000–01 and shared the Yachting Victoria's Sailor of the Year Trophy in 2001.

In 2001 Lauwers was awarded the Laureus World Sports Award for Sportsperson of the Year with a Disability. At the awards ceremony, where he was presented with his statuette by New Zealand sailor Sir Peter Blake and French footballer David Ginola, Lauwers joked that his wife allowed him a mistress "and she’s 48 foot long, 15 foot wide and has all the right curves."

On 25 May 2001, he was awarded the P&O Nedlloyd Disabled Sailor of the Year accolade.

In 2002, a DVD, The Spirit of Vision Quest: The Vinny Lauwers Story, was released.

Speaking of his crew members such as Lauwers and Liesl Tesch, founder of Sailors with Disabilities, David Pescud, said: "People are people first and your disability is either part of your life; it owns you or you own it. The guys I sail with, they own their disability and I’ve been very fortunate that I’ve sailed with some of the most amazing people."
