= Southwestern Oregon Community College =

College in Coos Bay, Oregon, U.S.

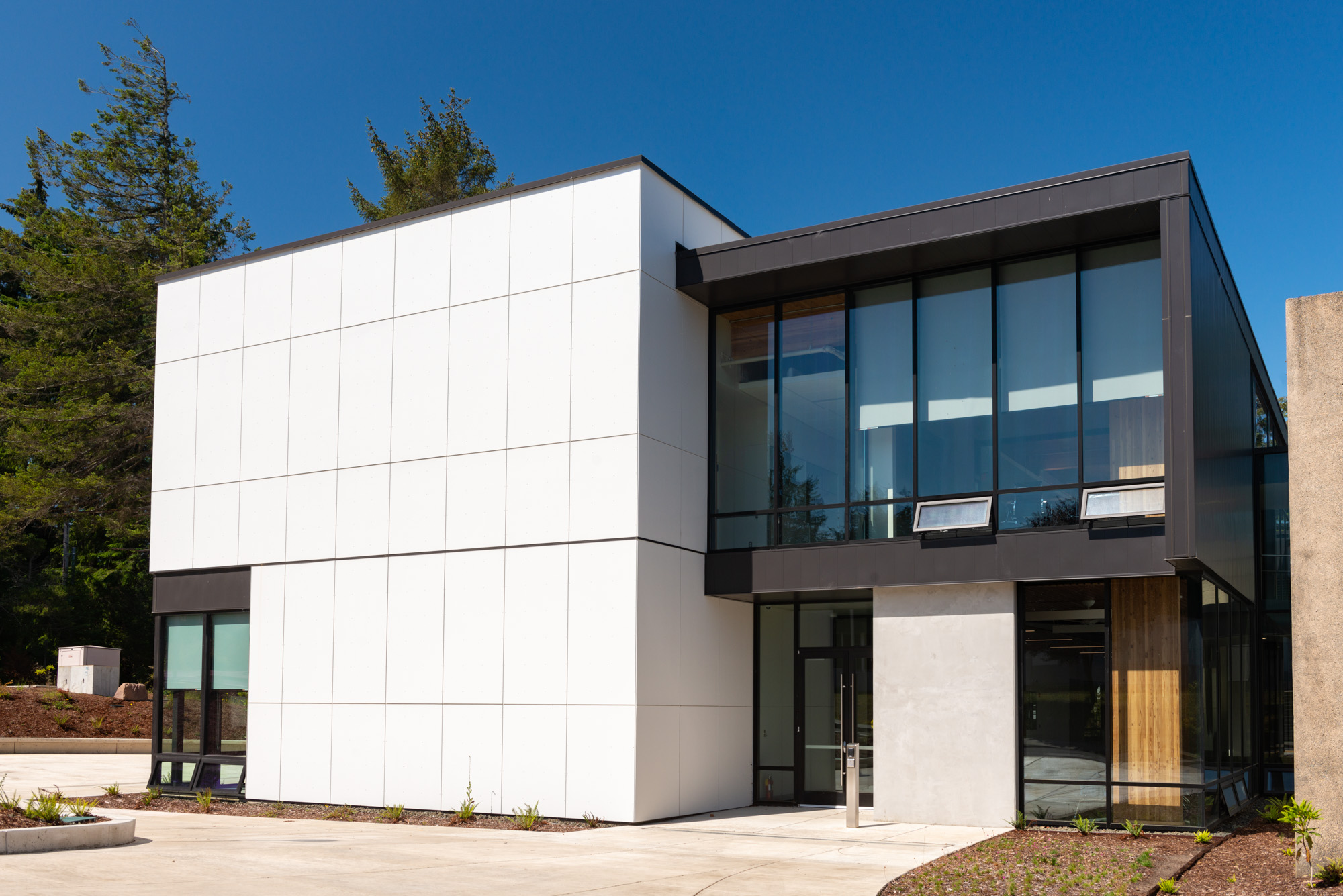
- Umpqua Hall
- Type: Public community college
- Established: 1961
- Academic affiliations: Space-grant
- President: Patty M. Scott
- Location: Coos Bay, Oregon, United States; 43.3952°N 124.252°W
- Mascot: Lakers
- Website: www.socc.edu

Southwestern Oregon Community College (SWOCC) is a public community college in Coos Bay, Oregon. It is Oregon's second oldest community college, founded in 1961.

== History ==
Founded in 1961, the college originally served Coos County and western Douglas County. In 1995, Curry County joined the district.

=== Controversy ===
On July 9, 2022, it was reported that SWOCC was ordered to pay $1.7 million in damages to Nicole Gililland. This came as a result of SWOCC professor Melissa Sperry arbitrarily changing Gililland’s grades, singling her out for punishment and shortening her assignment deadlines, stemming from Gililland’s past involvement in the adult industry.

Court documents from Nicole Gililland’s case also revealed a pattern of toxic behavior from the Southwestern Oregon Community College faculty with some of their lecturers openly ridiculing students for their physical appearance and one student being mocked by a member of faculty for her Eastern European accent.

== Notable alumni ==
- Shay Oberg - college softball player
- Doron Perkins - professional basketball player

== See also ==
- List of Oregon community colleges
