= Women's Professional Motocross =

Off-road motorized dirt bike racing sport

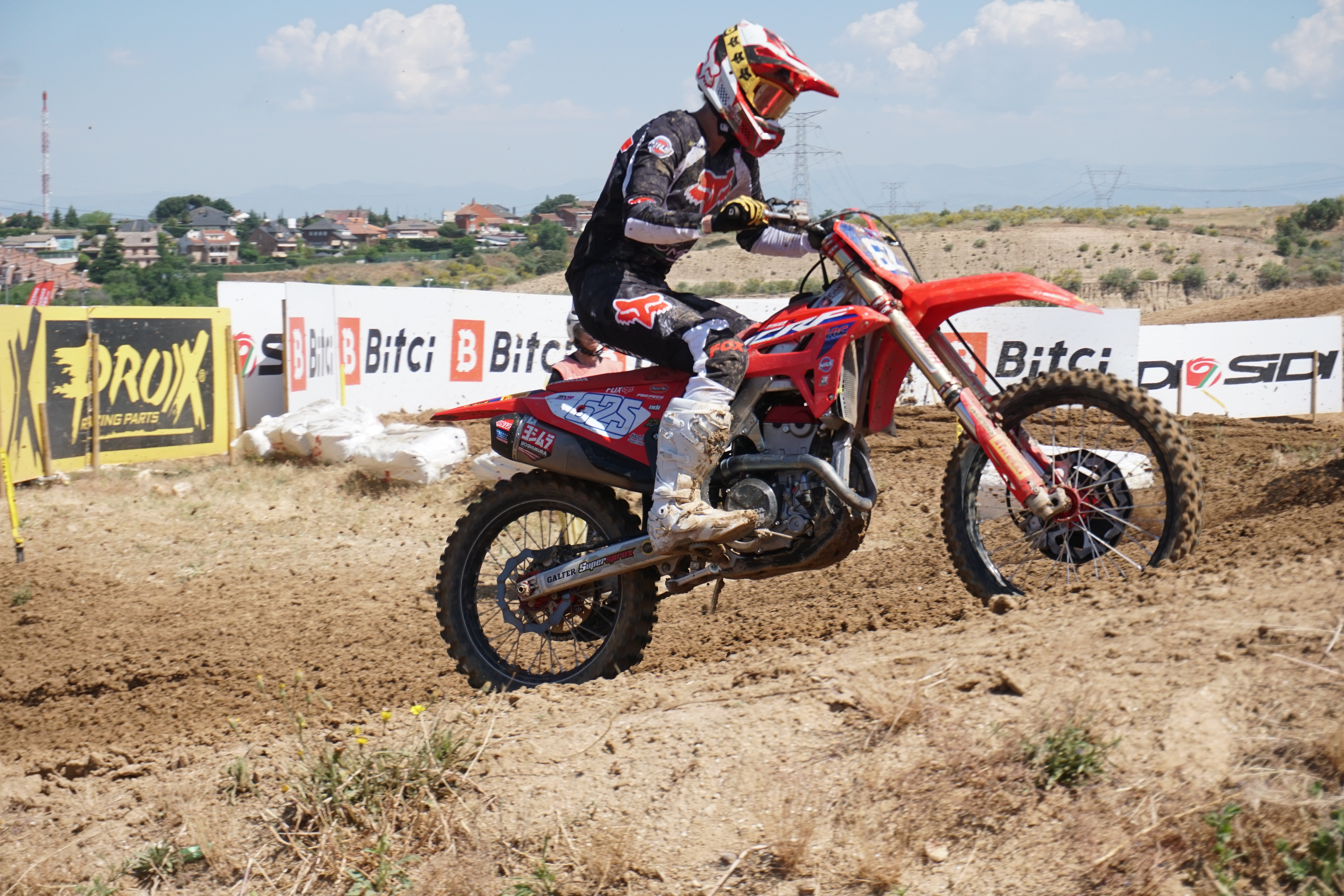
Tahlia Jayde O'Hare at the Motocross World Championship in Spain in 2022

Motocross is a form of off-road racing using off-road motorcycles on an enclosed dirt track. Races take place with multiple riders following the course at the same time, and the first person to complete the required number of laps in the shortest period of time wins. Women's motocross uses different rules and different bike sizes than the main motocross leagues. Riders in the women's leagues generally race bikes that are 125cc or 250cc. Mixed competition can be challenging, although it is allowed and has occurred. Women have competed in American Motorcyclist Association (AMA) races, but advancement to main events has been uncommon, largely due to lap times recorded during practice and heat races. Women's professional motocross has received support from established professional riders, who think that broader participation contributes positively to the sport's development. In addition, riders within women's motocross support one another through shared training and practice. Support across the sport has contributed to its continued growth.

== Background and history ==
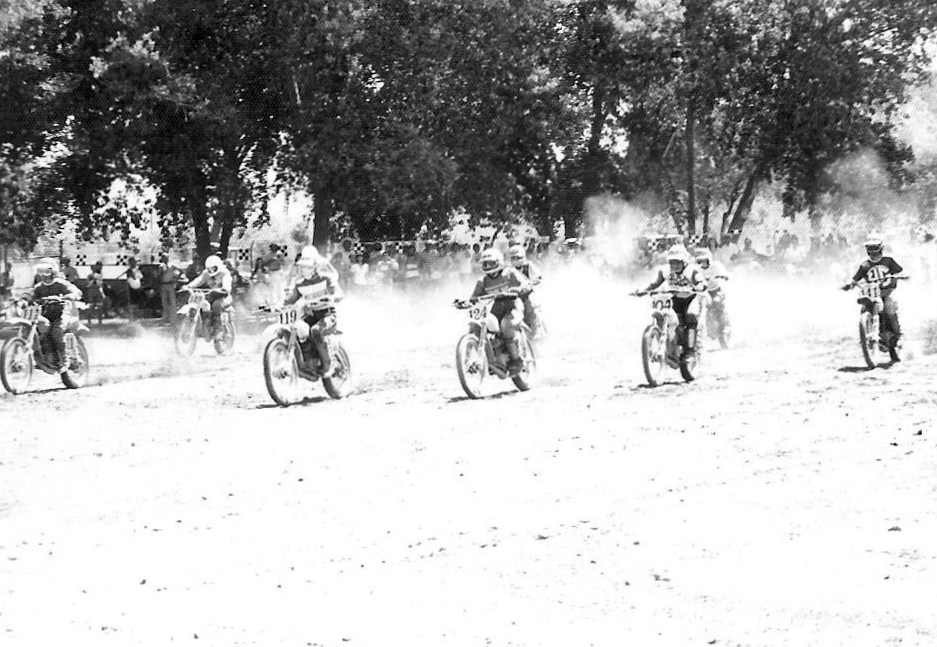
The Women's National Championships at Indian Dunes, in Valencia, California in 1976.

Motocross started circa 1924 in Europe and spread to the United States due to immigration. Women's professional motocross is an organized sports league where women can compete for money and prizes at the highest level of motocross. Women's motocross began in Europe in the early 1950s and 1960s and moved to the United States in the middle of the 1960s. This was during a time that women's equality movements were strong, helping the sport to grow.

In 1971, Kerry Kleid became the first woman to receive a professional motocross rider license, which was revoked after it was discovered that she was a woman. When processing her license paperwork, the registry did not know that she was female because there was no box that indicated this information. When she showed up at the first race in Unadilla, New York, she was told that she could not race because she was a woman. Kerry then went to court and eventually won her license back. However, this was the first time in history that women understood that they could be professionals in the world of motocross.

In 1974, the first Powder Puff National Championship took place, which marked the first time that a specifically women's National Championship was available for female motocross riders in the United States. The "Powder Puff" was a motocross event where women could race in heats in order to qualify for the main event, or the last race of the night, with the chance to win the championship.

In 1975, the event's name was changed from the Powder Puff National Championship to the Women's Motocross Nationals. The championship took place every year consecutively from 1975 through today, although the races were not held in 1982 and 1986.

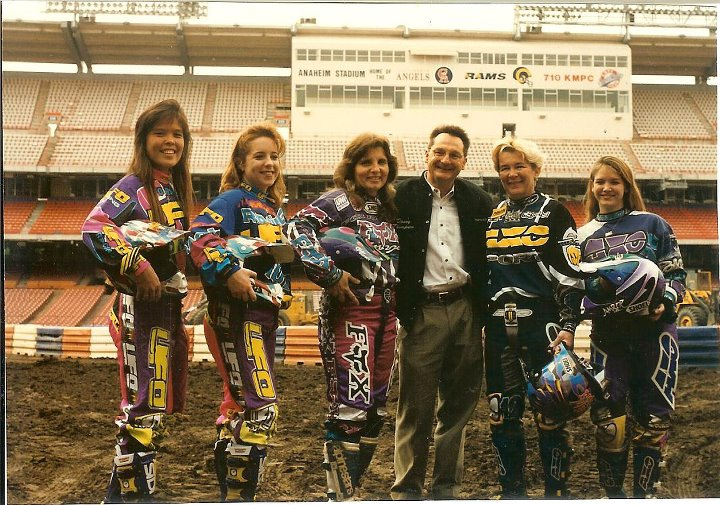
Members of U.S. Women's Motocross Team at the San Diego Supercross 1995 with MTEG Promoter Danny Thompson. Left to right: Corina Chinen, Jodi Hollow, Debbie Matthews, Danny Thompson, Gale Webb, Amber Hughes.

In 1996, the Women's Motocross League (WML) was founded after the first Women's Supercross Championships took place in 1995. Because of this, the WML was allowed to petition to be a part of the AMA Pro Motocross Championship, which included the men's ranks and races. This led to the creation of the Women's Motocross Association (WMA), which was founded in 2004 and sold to MX Sports, a large motocross corporation, in 2009. The sale secured women's motocross as a permanent part of the broader motocross industry. It also led to a name change from WMA to WMX to align with corporate branding.

== Culture ==
To encourage women in the sport, factory teams started to offer female riders contracts. Factory teams are teams of riders that are sponsored by a specific manufacturer or corporation. The teams will ride the motorcycles or use the protective equipment that the sponsor makes. There are more than 250 factory teams in the United States alone, including teams such as Suzuki, Yamaha, Honda, KTM, and Kawasaki. Without sponsorships and contracts, being a professional racer is prohibitively expensive. It costs over $200,000 a year for an elite motocross rider to be ready for the season. This includes their bike, trainers, spare parts, transportation, fuel costs, and many other expenses. Factory teams are similar to other professional sports teams, including high qualifications and extensive training. The training includes not only time spent riding motorcycles but also time in the gym and on pedal bikes.

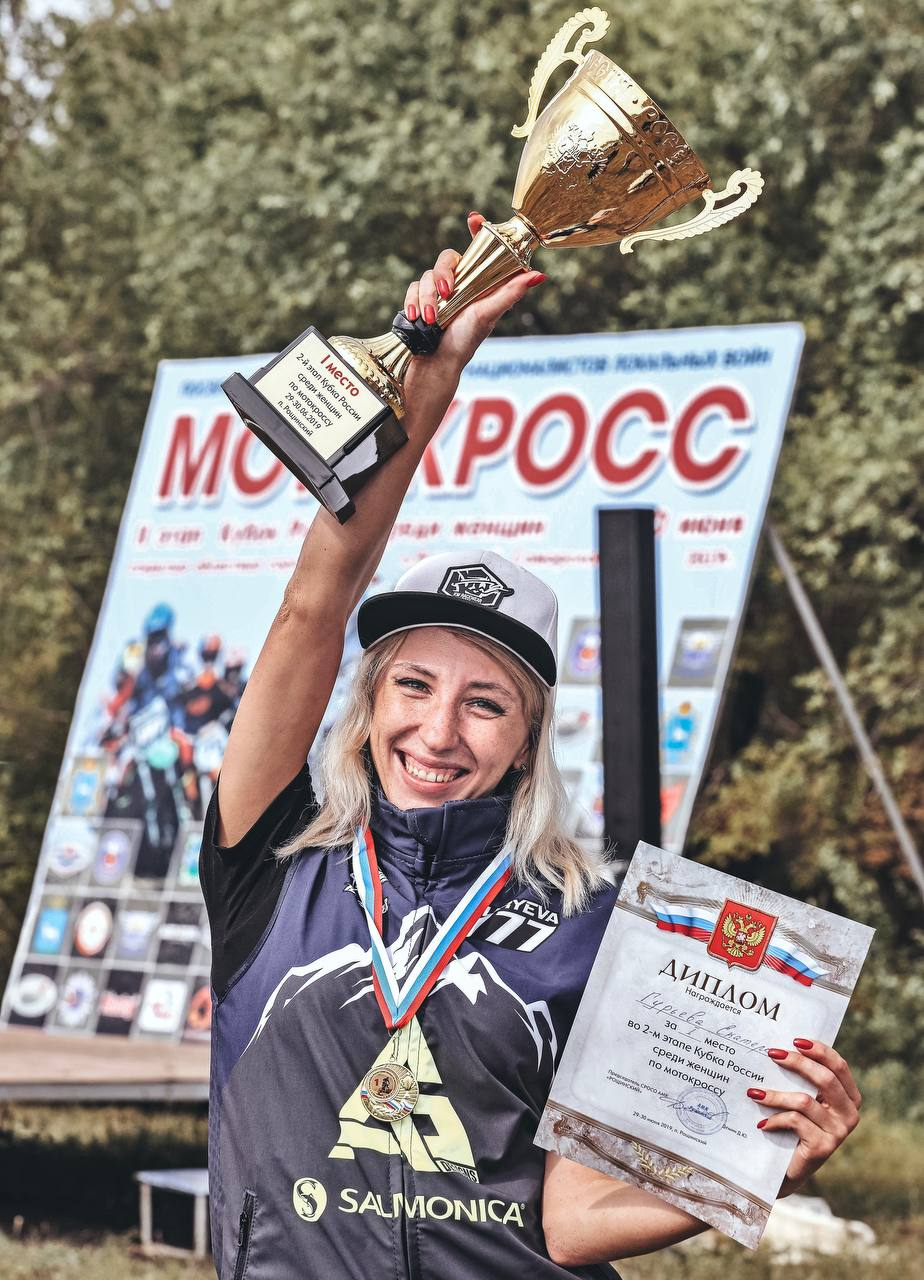
Guryeva Ekaterina - Photo from the final of the Russian Motocross Championship 2021. (became a 7-time champion of Russia)

Motocross is a sport that requires dedication and constant work. Women's professional motocross, similarly to the male-dominated motocross main events, requires extensive training, mental fortitude, and a competitive mindset in order to be on top.

== Notable riders ==
=== Debbie Matthews ===
Debbie Matthews founded the Women's Motocross League (WML), which was later renamed to the WMX. In 2024, she was inducted into the AMA Hall of Fame for her "outstanding achievements in advocacy, competition, and promotion of the sport of motorcycling."

=== Ashley Fiolek ===
Ashley Fiolek, a rider from Dearborn, Michigan, won more amateur and professional races than anyone else in her age group. She competed from 2008 until 2012. She was born deaf, which is one of the reasons she started racing. She was unable to participate easily in team sports. Fiolek began riding since she did not have to talk or hear anything other than the bike. Being deaf served as an advantage while racing because she could not hear what was going on outside the track, allowing her to focus on the race. Fiolek was a factory rider for Team Honda. At 21, Fiolek walked away from racing professionally due to contract terms and because she no longer supported the direction that the sport was going. Ashley now trains younger riders.

== See also ==
- Fédération Internationale de Motocyclisme – International sport governing body
- Motocross – Off-road motorcycle racing held on enclosed off-road circuits
- Outline of motorcycles and motorcycling – Overview of and topical guide to motorcycles and motorcycling
