= Laureus World Sports Award for Sportsperson of the Year with a Disability =

Disabled sports award

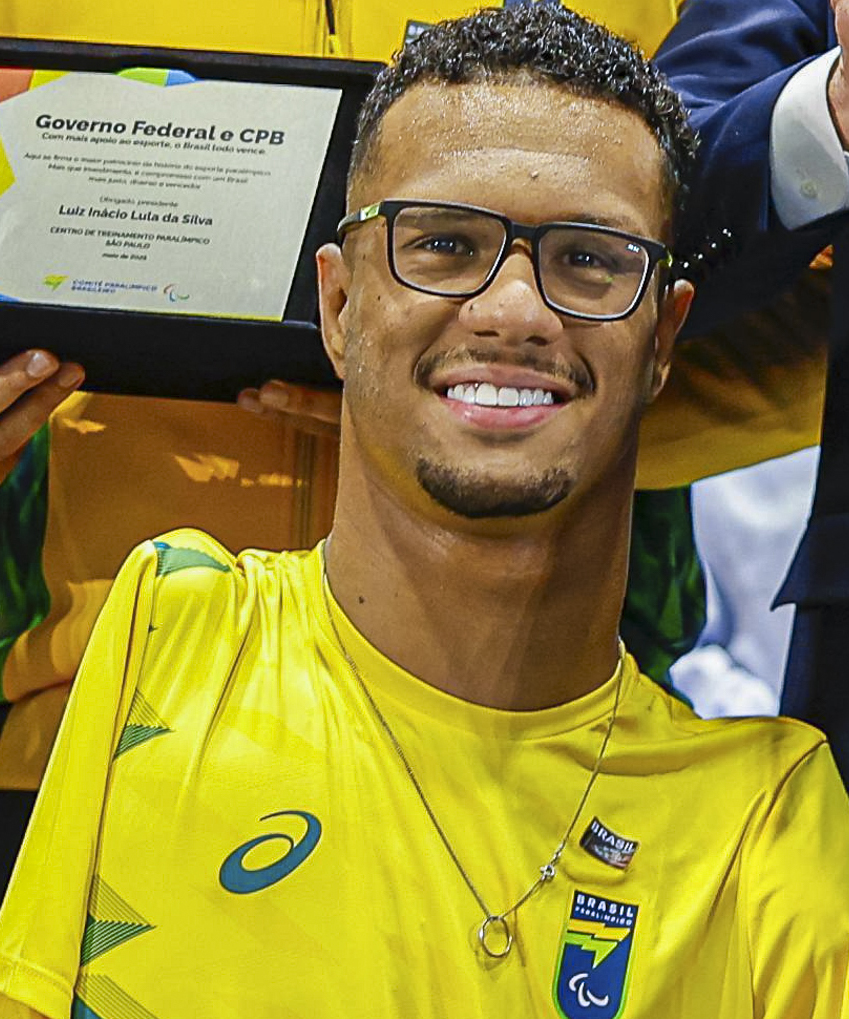
- Gabriel Araújo, 2026 winner
- Awarded for: "the person who best demonstrates excellent athletic achievement and strong leadership qualities in a sport in the Paralympic programme"
- Location: Madrid (2026)
- Presented by: Laureus Sport for Good Foundation
- First award: 2000
- Currently held by: Gabriel Araújo (BRA) (2026)
- Website: Official website

The Laureus World Sports Award for Sportsperson of the Year with a Disability is an annual award honouring the achievements of individual disabled athletes from the world of Paralympic sports. It was first awarded in 2000 as one of the seven constituent awards presented during the Laureus World Sports Awards. The awards are presented by the Laureus Sport for Good Foundation, a global organisation involved in more than 150 charity projects supporting 500,000 young people. The first ceremony was held on 25 May 2000 in Monte Carlo, at which Nelson Mandela gave the keynote speech. Nominations for the award come from a specialist panel. The Laureus World Sports Academy then selects the winner who is presented with a Laureus statuette, created by Cartier, at an annual awards ceremony held in various locations around the world. The awards are considered highly prestigious and are frequently referred to as the sporting equivalent of "Oscars".

The first winner of the award was the Australian wheelchair racer, Louise Sauvage, who had won three medals at the 2000 Sydney Paralympics. In 2002, Esther Vergeer, a Dutch wheelchair tennis player, was selected as the award winner. Described as the "most dominant athlete in the world", Vergeer won 470 matches in a row during her career, collecting 284 titles, including 21 grand slam singles titles and 23 grand slam doubles titles. She is one of two people to have won the Sportsperson of the Year with a Disability award more than once, winning again in 2008; she was also nominated in 2006, 2007, 2011 and 2012. The Brazilian swimmer Daniel Dias has the most wins, collecting the award three times with a further three nominations, while German racing cyclist Michael Teuber has been nominated the most times (four) without winning. The 2004 winner, Canadian sprinter Earle Connor, had his award and his 2002 nomination rescinded after he failed a drugs test. Athletes have been the most successful at the awards with 6 wins and 28 nominations (excluding Connor's results), followed by swimmers with 4 wins and 19 nominations. The award was not presented in the 2021 ceremony. The 2026 winner of the award was the Brazilian Paralympic swimmer Gabriel Araújo.

== List of winners and nominees ==
Key
*	Indicates individual whose award or nomination was later rescinded

Laureus World Sports Award for Sportsperson of the Year with a Disability winners and nominees
Year	Image	Winner	Nationality	Sport	Nominees	Refs
2000	Louise Sauvage	Louise Sauvage	AUS	Athletics	Brian Frasure (USA) – athletics Béatrice Hess (FRA) – swimming	
2001	–	Vinny Lauwers	AUS	Sailing	Shea Cowart (USA) – athletics David Hall (AUS) – wheelchair tennis Béatrice Hess (FRA) – swimming Lee Pearson (GBR) – equestrian	
2002	Esther Vergeer	Esther Vergeer	NED	Wheelchair tennis	Heidi Andreasen (FRO) – swimming Earle Connor* (CAN) – athletics Gerd Schönfelder (GER) – alpine skiing Beat Schwarzenbach (SUI) – cycling	
2003	Michael Milton	Michael Milton	AUS	Alpine skiing	Tanja Kari (FIN) – cross-country skiing Chantal Petitclerc (CAN) – athletics Paul Schulte (USA) – wheelchair basketball Michael Teuber (GER) – cycling	
2004	–	Earle Connor*	CAN	Athletics	Natalie du Toit (RSA) – swimming Vitalis Lanshima (NGR) – athletics Ronny Persson (SWE) – alpine skiing Michael Teuber (GER) – cycling Nicola Tustain (GBR) – equestrian	
2005	Chantal Petitclerc	Chantal Petitclerc	CAN	Athletics	Cheri Blauwet (USA) – athletics Jonas Jacobsson (SWE) – shooting Lee Pearson (GBR) – equestrian Clodoaldo Silva (BRA) – swimming Henry Wanyoike (KEN) – athletics	
2006	Ernst van Dyk	Ernst van Dyk	RSA	Athletics	Kirsten Bruhn (GER) – swimming Zsuzsanna Krajnyak (HUN) – wheelchair fencing Leo-Pekka Tähti (FIN) – athletics Esther Vergeer (NED) – wheelchair tennis Henry Wanyoike (KEN) – athletics	
2007	Martin Braxenthaler	Martin Braxenthaler	GER	Alpine skiing	Kurt Fearnley (AUS) – athletics Edith Hunkeler (SUI) – athletics Javier Otxoa (ESP) – cycling Kazem Rajabi (IRN) – powerlifting Esther Vergeer (NED) – wheelchair tennis	
2008	Esther Vergeer	Esther Vergeer	NED	Wheelchair tennis	Daniel Dias (BRA) – swimming Darren Kenny (GBR) – cycling Sarah Storey (GBR) – cycling/swimming Michael Teuber (GER) – cycling	
2009	Daniel Dias	Daniel Dias	BRA	Swimming	April Holmes (USA) – athletics Jonas Jacobsson (SWE) – shooting Darren Kenny (GBR) – cycling Zhang Lixin (CHN) – athletics Teresa Perales (ESP) – swimming	
2010	Natalie du Toit	Natalie du Toit	RSA	Swimming	Justin Eveson (AUS) – wheelchair basketball/swimming Kurt Fearnley (AUS) – athletics Gizem Girişmen (TUR) – archery Shingo Kunieda (JPN) – wheelchair tennis Michael Teuber (GER) – cycling	
2011	Verena Bentele	Verena Bentele	GER	Biathlon / Cross-country skiing	Matthew Cowdrey (AUS) – swimming Daniel Dias (BRA) – swimming Jakub Krako (SVK) – alpine skiing Esther Vergeer (NED) – wheelchair tennis Lauren Woolstencroft (CAN) – alpine skiing	
2012	Oscar Pistorius	Oscar Pistorius	RSA	Athletics	Daniel Dias (BRA) – swimming Terezinha Guilhermina (BRA) – athletics Esther Vergeer (NED) – wheelchair tennis David Weir (GBR) – athletics Irek Zaripov (RUS) – biathlon / cross-country skiing	
2013	Daniel Dias	Daniel Dias	BRA	Swimming	Patrick Anderson (CAN) – wheelchair basketball Johanna Benson (NAM) – athletics Alan Oliveira (BRA) – athletics David Weir (GBR) – athletics Alex Zanardi (ITA) – cycling	
2014	Marie Bochet	Marie Bochet	FRA	Alpine skiing	Marcel Hug (SUI) – athletics Tatyana McFadden (USA) – athletics Sophie Pascoe (NZL) – swimming Sarah Louise Rung (NOR) – swimming Olga Sviderska (UKR) – swimming	
2015	Tatyana McFadden	Tatyana McFadden	USA	Athletics	Shelley Gautier (CAN) – cycling Roman Petushkov (RUS) – Nordic skiing Anna Schaffelhuber (GER) – alpine skiing Sarah Storey (GBR) – cycling Leung Yuk Wing (HKG) – boccia	
2016	Daniel Dias	Daniel Dias	BRA	Swimming	Marie Bochet (FRA) – alpine skiing Liu Cuiqing (CHN) – athletics Omara Durand (CUB) – athletics Pieter du Preez (RSA) – athletics/cycling Leung Yuk Wing (HKG) – boccia	
2017	Beatrice Vio	Beatrice Vio	ITA	Wheelchair fencing	Ihar Boki (BLR) – swimming Omara Durand (CUB) – athletics Marcel Hug (SUI) – athletics Sophie Pascoe (NZL) – swimming Siamand Rahman (IRN) – powerlifting	
2018	Marcel Hug in 2014	Marcel Hug	SUI	Wheelchair athletics	Yui Kamiji (JPN) – Wheelchair tennis Oksana Masters (USA) – Paralympic cross-country skiing Bibian Mentel-Spee (NED) – Para-snowboarding; Jetze Plat (NED) – Paratriathlon/cycling; Markus Rehm (GER) – athletics	
2019	Henrieta Farkasova in 2013	Henrieta Farkašová	SVK	Alpine skiing	Brian McKeever (CAN) - Paralympic cross-country skiing Diede de Groot (NED) – wheelchair tennis Grigorios Polychronidis (GRE) – boccia Markus Rehm (GER) – athletics Oksana Masters (USA) – Paralympic cross-country skiing	
2020	Oxana Masters in 2012	Oksana Masters	USA	Paralympic cross-country skiing	Alice Tai (GBR) – swimming Diede de Groot (NED) – wheelchair tennis Jetze Plat (NED) – Paratriathlon; Manuela Schär (SUI) – athletics Omara Durand (CUB) – athletics	
2021	Not awarded					
2022	Marcel Hug in 2014	Marcel Hug	SUI	Wheelchair athletics	Diede de Groot (NED) – wheelchair tennis Jetze Plat (NED) – Paratriathlon; Sarah Storey (GBR) – cycling Shingo Kunieda (JAP) – wheelchair tennis Susana Rodriguez (ESP) - Paratriathlon	
2023		Catherine Debrunner	SUI	Wheelchair athletics	Cameron Leslie (NZL) - swimming Declan Farmer (USA) - para ice hockey Diede de Groot (NED) – wheelchair tennis Jesper Saltvik Pedersen (NOR) – alpine skiing Oksana Masters (USA) – Paralympic cross-country skiing	
2024	Diede de Groot in 2023	Diede de Groot	NED	Wheelchair tennis	Simone Barlaam (ITA) - swimming Danylo Chufarov (UKR) - swimming Luca Ekler (HUN) - athletics Nicole Murray (NZL) - cycling Markus Rehm (GER) - athletics	
2025	–	Yuyan Jiang	CHN	Para swimming	Catherine Debrunner (SUI) – athletics Tokito Oda (JPN) – wheelchair tennis Teresa Perales (ESP) – Para swimming Matt Stutzman (USA) – Para archery Zimo Qu (CHN) – Para badminton	
2026		Gabriel Araújo	BRA	Para swimming	Simone Barlaam (ITA) – para swimming Catherine Debrunner (SUI) – para-athletics Kelsey DiClaudio (USA) – para ice hockey David Kratochvíl (CZE) – para swimming Kiara Rodríguez (ECU) – para-athletics	

== Statistics ==
Statistics are correct as of 2026 ceremony.

Key
*	Indicates totals which exclude rescissions

Winners by nationality
Country	Winners	Nominations
BRA	4	7
NED	3	12
SUI	3	9
AUS	3	5
RSA	3	2
USA	2	11
GER	2	11
CAN	1*	5*
CHN	1	4
FRA	1	3
ITA	1	3
SVK	1	1
GBR	0	11
NZL	0	4
ESP	0	4
JPN	0	4
CUB	0	3
SWE	0	3
FIN	0	2
HKG	0	2
HUN	0	2
IRN	0	2
KEN	0	2
NOR	0	2
RUS	0	2
UKR	0	2
BLR	0	1
FRO	0	1
GRE	0	1
NAM	0	1
NGR	0	1
TUR	0	1
CZE	0	1
ECU	0	1

Winners by sport
Sport	Winners	Nominations
Athletics	8*	35*
Swimming	6	27
Wheelchair tennis	3	13
Alpine skiing	3	8
Cross-country skiing	2	6
Biathlon	1	1
Wheelchair fencing	1	1
Sailing	1	0
Cycling	0	15
Triathlon	0	4
Equestrian	0	3
Wheelchair basketball	0	3
Boccia	0	2
Powerlifting	0	2
Shooting	0	2
Archery	0	2
Para Ice Hockey	0	2
Boccia	0	1
Nordic skiing	0	1
Snowboarding	0	1
Badminton	0	1

Multiple winners and nominees
Name	Wins	Nominations
Daniel Dias	3	3
Esther Vergeer	2	4
Marcel Hug	2	3
Diede de Groot	1	4
Oksana Masters	1	4
Marie Bochet	1	1
Natalie du Toit	1	1
Tatyana McFadden	1	1
Chantal Petitclerc	1	1
Gabriel Araújo	1	1
Michael Teuber	0	4
Omara Durand	0	3
Jetze Plat	0	3
Markus Rehm	0	3
Sarah Storey	0	3
Kurt Fearnley	0	2
Béatrice Hess	0	2
Jonas Jacobsson	0	2
Darren Kenny	0	2
Sophie Pascoe	0	2
Lee Pearson	0	2
Henry Wanyoike	0	2
David Weir	0	2
Leung Yuk Wing	0	2
Shingo Kunieda	0	2

== See also ==
- Best Female Athlete with a Disability ESPY Award
- Best Male Athlete with a Disability ESPY Award
- Paralympic Games
