= Best Action Sports Athlete ESPY Award =

Annual athletic award

- Awarded for: best action sports athlete
- Location: Los Angeles (2003)
- Presented by: ESPN
- First award: 2002
- Final award: 2003
- Currently held by: Shaun White (USA)
- Website: www.espn.co.uk/espys/

The Best Action Sports Athlete ESPY Award was an annual award honoring the achievements of an athlete from the world of action sports. It was first awarded as part of the ESPY Awards in the 2002 ceremony. The Best Action Sports Athlete ESPY Award trophy, created by sculptor Lawrence Nowlan, was presented to the action sports athlete adjudged to be the best in a given calendar year. Balloting for the award was undertaken by a panel of experts who composed the ESPN Select Nominating Committee. Through the 2001 iteration of the ESPY Awards, ceremonies were conducted in February of each year to honor achievements over the previous calendar year; awards presented thereafter are conferred in July and reflect performance from the June previous. (Note: Because of the rescheduling of the ESPY Awards ceremony, the award presented in 2002 was given in consideration of performance betwixt February 2001 and June 2002.)

The inaugural winner of the Best Action Sports Athlete ESPY Award was American snowboarder Kelly Clark at the 2002 edition. During 2001 and 2002, she won seven major worldwide snowboarding competitions, which included the gold medal in the women's halfpipe at the 2002 Winter Olympics in Salt Lake City, and first place at the Winter X Games. Clark became the first female snowboarder to be nominated for, and hence to win, an ESPY Award. Americans won both times the accolade was given out with fellow snowboarder Shaun White being voted the only male winner of the award at the 2003 ceremony. The Best Action Sports Athlete ESPY Award was by gender in 2004, since which year Best Female Action Sports Athlete ESPY Award and the Best Male Action Sports Athlete ESPY Award have been presented.

== Winners and nominees ==
Best Action Sports Athlete ESPY Award winners and nominees
Year	Image	Athlete	Nationality	Sport	Nominees	Refs
2002	Kelly Clark competing in a snowboarding event in 2010	Kelly Clark	USA	Snowboarding (halfpipe)	Bob Burnquist (BRA) – Skateboarding; Ricky Carmichael (USA) – Motocross	
2003	Shaun White in casual clothing at an event in 2008	Shaun White	USA	Snowboarding (halfpipe)	Aleisha Cline (CAN) – Skiing; Andy Irons (USA) – Surfing; Blair Morgan (USA) – Snocross	

== See also ==
- Laureus World Sports Award for Action Sportsperson of the Year
