= Scott Smiley =

First blind U.S. Army officer

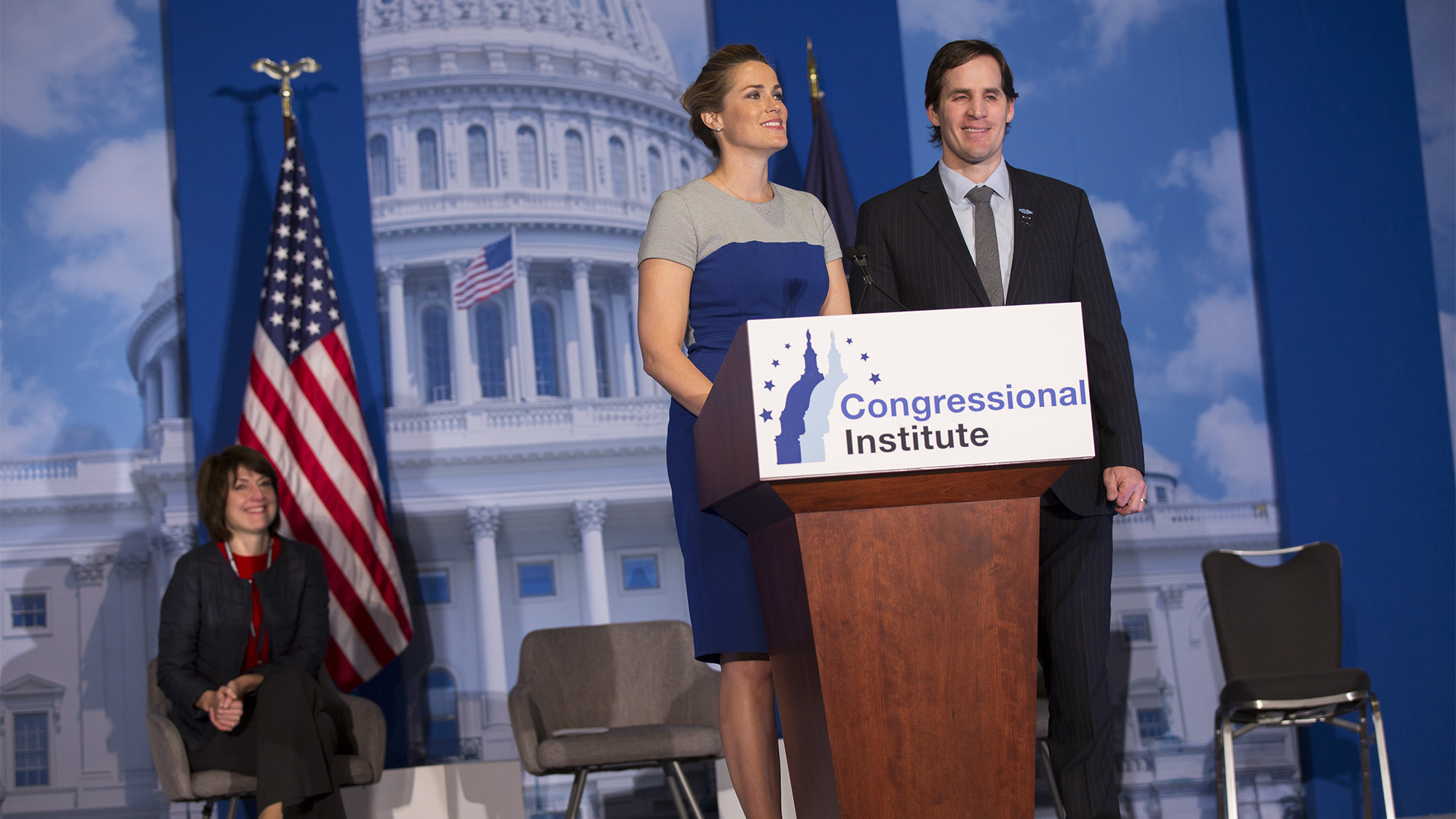
- Scott Smiley with his wife Tiffany
- Alma mater: United States Military Academy; Duke University(MBA)
- Spouse: Tiffany Smiley
- Children: 3
- Military career
- Allegiance: United States of America
- Branch: United States Army
- Service years: 2003–2015
- Rank: Major
- Nickname: Scotty
- Units: 25th Infantry Division; 24th Infantry Regiment
- Conflicts: Iraq War; Battle of Mosul (2004)
- Awards: Bronze Star Medal; Purple Heart

Scott "Scotty" Smiley is a retired U.S. Army Major and United States Military Academy graduate. He was the U.S. Army's first blind active duty officer, serving as a blind man for about 10 years. Smiley continued to be physically active after being blinded and was given many awards and honors.

== Military career ==
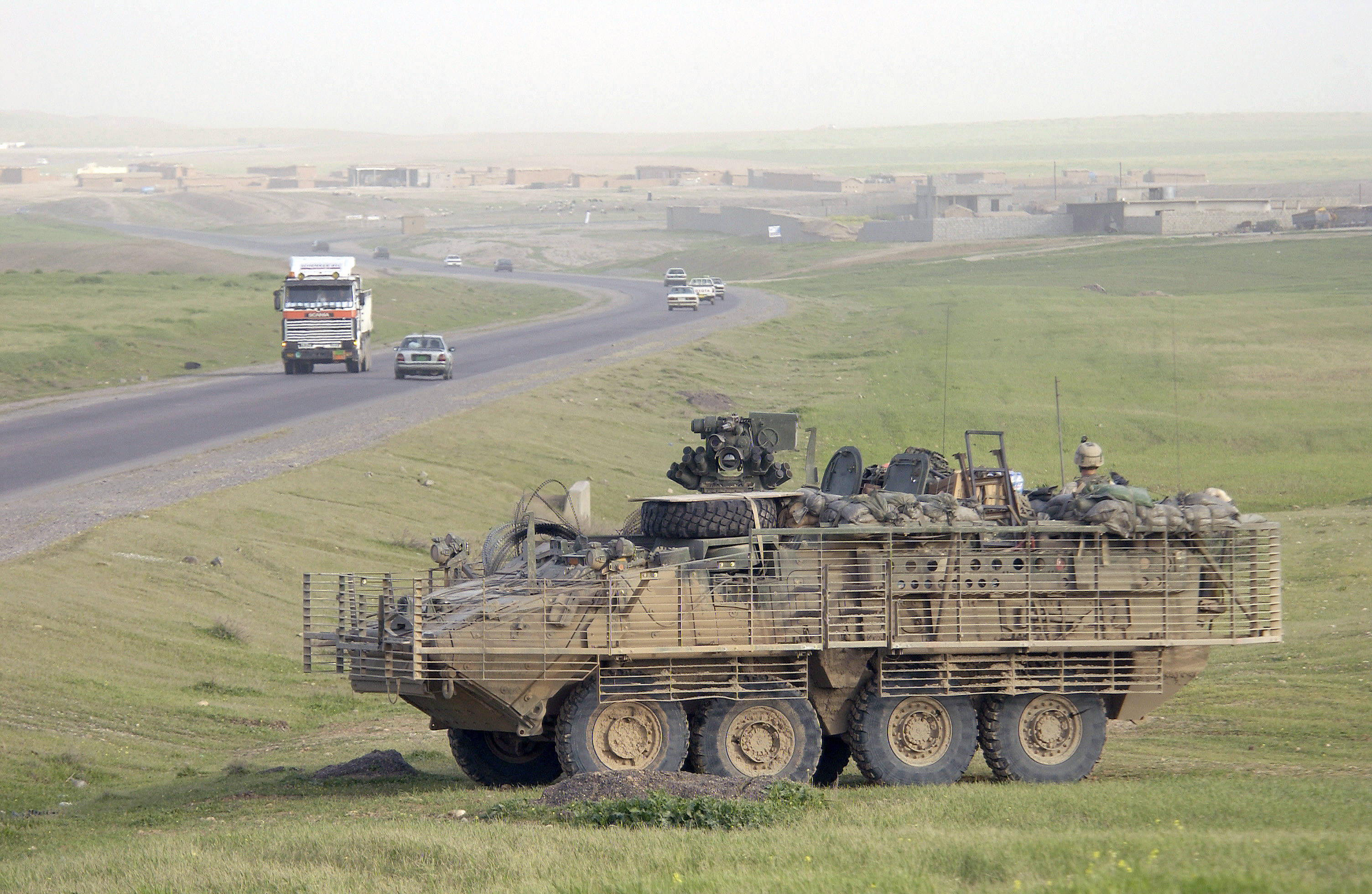
A M1126 Stryker ICV on patrol near Mosul, Iraq, 2005

Smiley is from Pasco, Washington and he graduated from Pasco High School in 1999. After graduating from the United States Military Academy in West Point, New York in 2003 he then completed the Basic Officer Leaders Course and Ranger School both at Fort Benning, Georgia. He was then stationed at Fort Lewis, Washington where he led a platoon of 45 men.

While at West Point Smiley became friends with Edward Graham, the son of Franklin Graham. Smiley and Graham ended up entering the Army on the same day, were in Ranger School together and were in the same platoon.

On April 6, 2005, Smiley was wounded while partially exposed on the top of a Stryker in Mosul, Iraq when a suicide bomber blew up a car close by. Smiley fired two warning shots in front of the vehicle and then the car exploded which sent shrapnel into his eyes.

The shrapnel that entered Smiley's eyes left him blind and temporarily paralyzed. He woke up a week later in Walter Reed Army Medical Center. An Army medical review board later declared him mentally and physically fit to continue to serve. He then became the U.S. Army's first blind active duty officer.

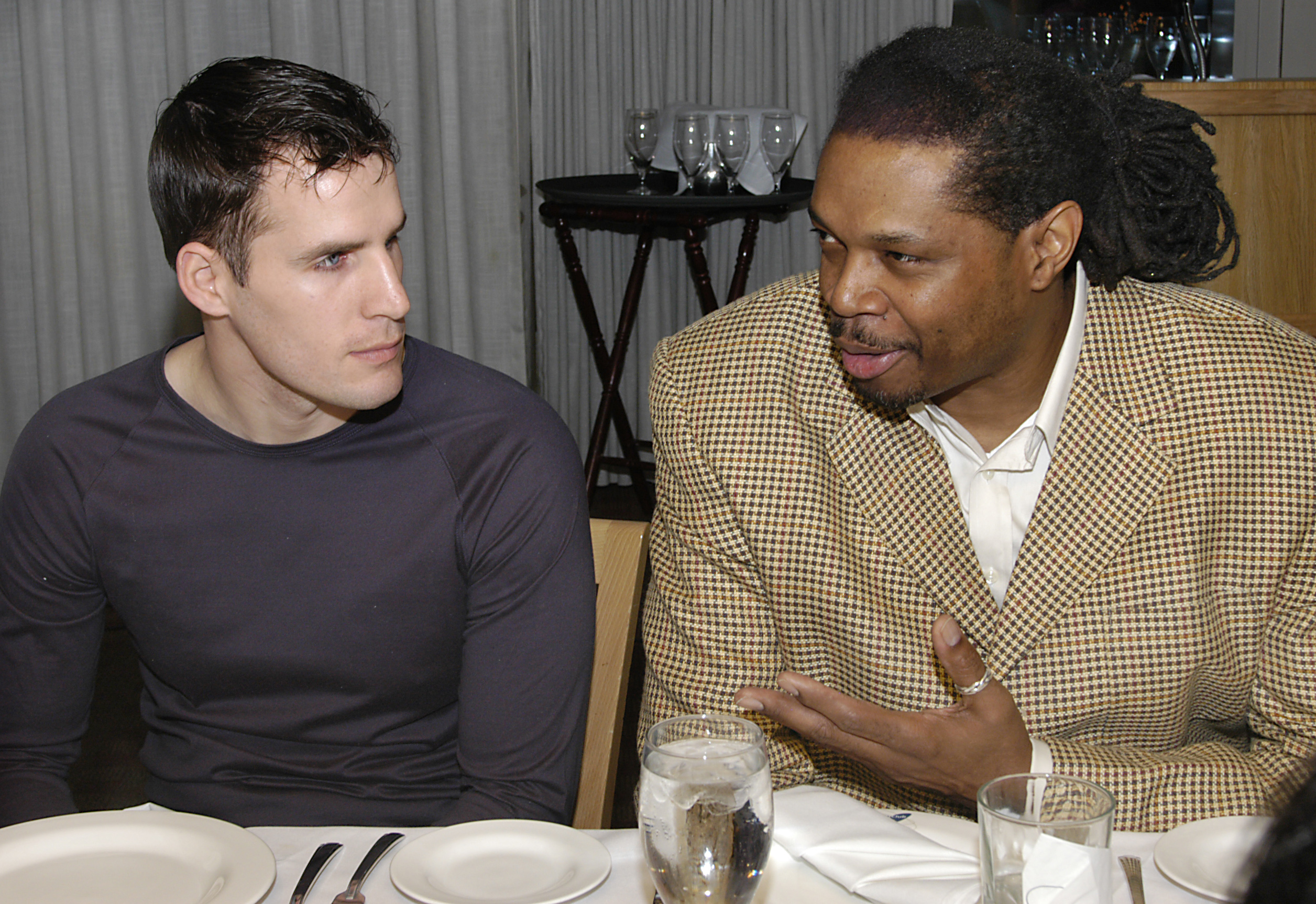
Former U.S. Olympic basketball player Sam Perkins chats with then Captain Smiley before the Washington Wizards and Miami Heat basketball game in Washington on December 15, 2006.

Even though blind, Smiley earned a Master of Business Administration from Duke University's Fuqua School of Business. He also taught military leadership at West Point and led the Warrior Transition Unit at West Point's Keller Army Medical Center becoming the first blind officer to lead a company. Smiley also earned the Army's MacArthur Leadership Award.

Smiley remained physically active despite blindness. He tandem skydived with the U.S. Army's Golden Knights, skied in Vail, Colorado, surfed in Hawaii, climbed Mount Rainier and completed a Coeur d'Alene Ironman. Smiley's completion of an ironman was also the subject of a documentary. The Army Times named then Captain Smiley "Soldier of the Year" in 2007 and ESPN awarded him an ESPY Award in 2008 for the best outdoor athlete.

In 2010 Smiley authored his biography Hope Unseen. He also received the "Father of the Year" award that same year in New York from the National Father's Day Committee. He received the Christopher Award and the Louis Braille Award both in 2011. Smiley also holds an Honorary PhD from Mount Saint Mary College.

Smiley was invited to speak to the U.S. Men's Summer Olympic Games Basketball "Dream Team" before they earned gold medals in 2008 and 2012. In March 2012, he graduated from the Maneuver Captains Career Course at Fort Benning, Georgia and then had a position with the Gonzaga University ROTC Department in Spokane, Washington.

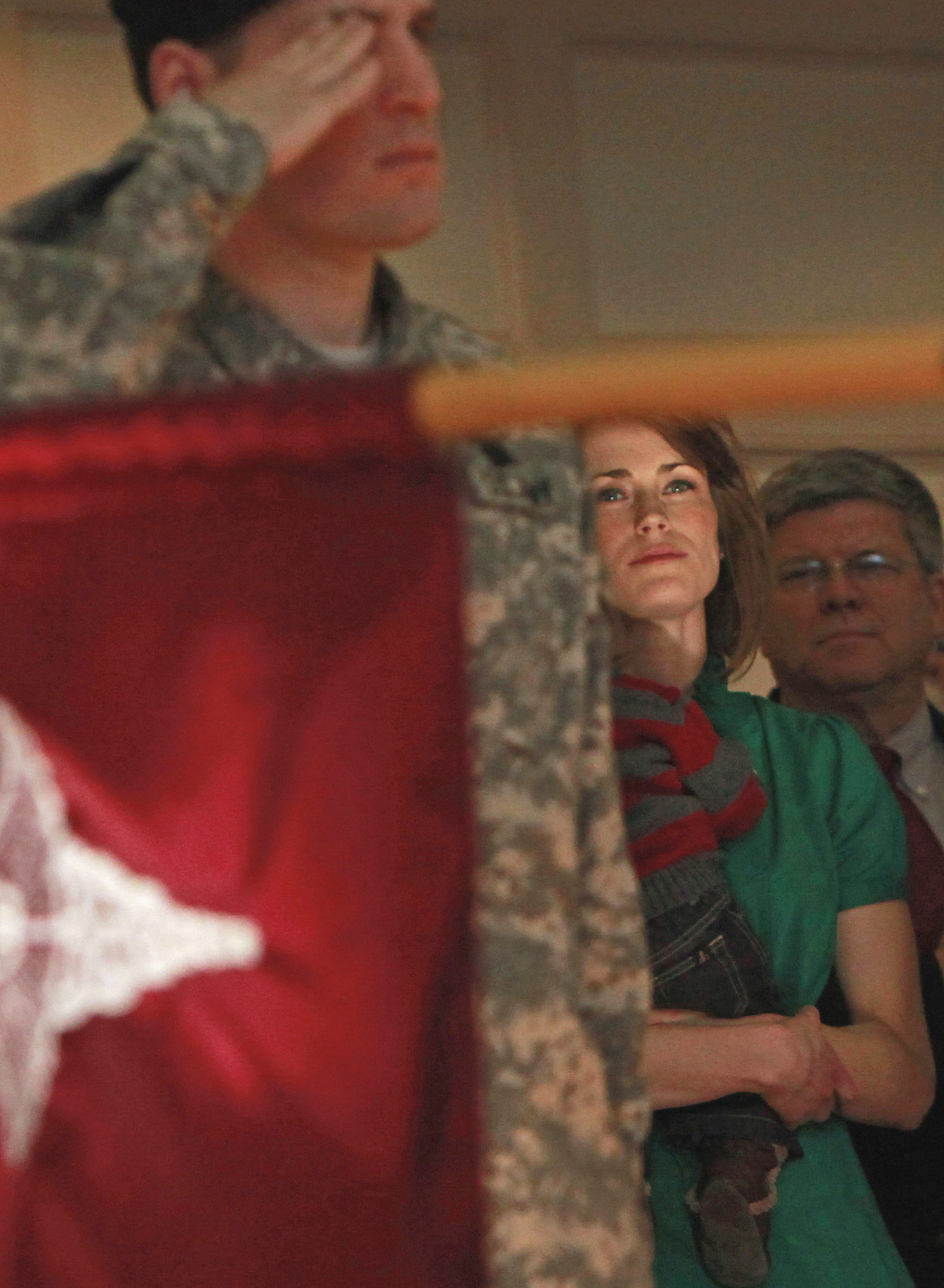
Tiffany Smiley holds her youngest son while watching her husband then Captain Smiley salute the colors during the U.S. Army Warrior Transition Unit change of command ceremony Feb 1, 2010 at West Point, N.Y.

On November 9, 2014, at CenturyLink Field in Seattle, Smiley was honored with raising the 12th man flag for the Seattle Seahawks Salute to Service game. Also in 2014, he spoke to students at Pasco High School, which he graduated from. Major Smiley medically retired from the Army in 2015.

== Post-military life ==
On May 17, 2017, Smiley was inducted into the New York State Senate Veterans' Hall of fame by Senator William J. Larkin Jr.

In 2018 Smiley received the Patriot of Hope Award in Beverly Hills, California and in that same year he and his family appeared on Dr. Phil to exhibit a special device that helps blind people read. Also in 2018, Smiley and his wife Tiffany met President Trump at the National Prayer Breakfast in Washington, D.C.

Smiley's wife, Tiffany Smiley, unsuccessfully ran in the 2022 United States Senate election in Washington. She received 42.7% of the vote. Tiffany Smiley's "Gameday" campaign ad faced a lawsuit with the Seattle Seahawks for using their logo without permission. Scotty Smiley briefly appears in the ad wearing a Seattle Seahawks jersey. The ad was later changed. Tiffany Smiley's campaign also had issues with Starbucks and The Seattle Times for use of their logos without permission.

In 2023, both Scott and Tiffany Smiley were interviewed in episode 77 of Jeff Struecker's podcast Unbeatable.

In the spring of 2024, Tiffany Smiley announced she was running for Washington's 4th Congressional district.

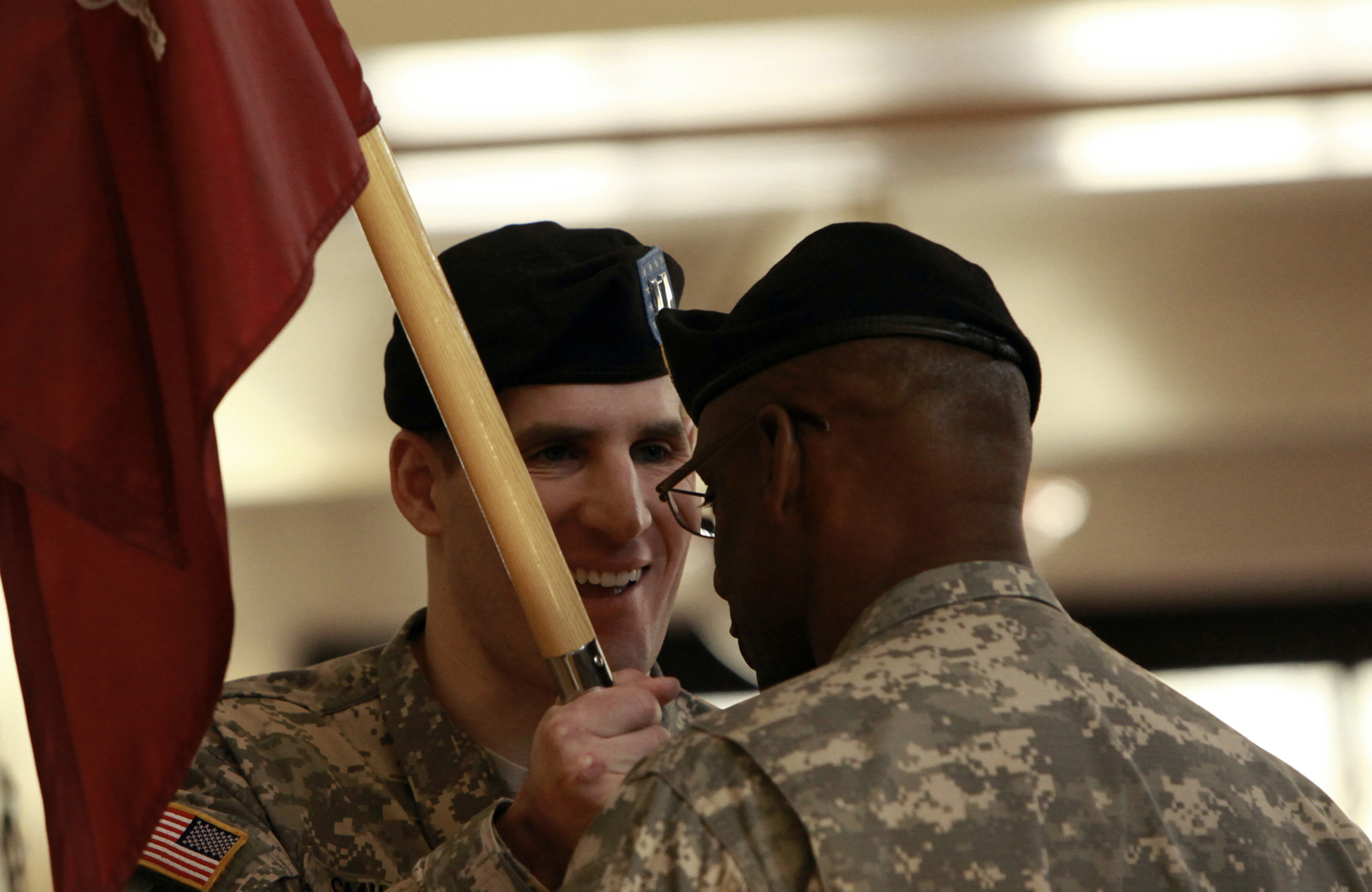
Then Captain Smiley passing the guidon back to 1st Sgt. Deon E. Dabrio during the change of command ceremony on Feb 1, 2010 for the U.S. Army Warrior Transition Unit at West Point, N.Y.

== Personal life ==
Smiley is a Christian.

Since Smiley was blinded in 2005, he has never seen his 3 children.

== Awards and decorations ==
Major Smiley has received the following awards:

Right breast		Left breast		
24th Infantry Regiment Badge Valorous Unit Award
24th Infantry Regiment Badge Valorous Unit Award	Combat Infantryman Badge			
24th Infantry Regiment Badge Valorous Unit Award	Bronze Star Medal	Purple Heart	Meritorious Service Medal with 1 Bronze Oak Leaf Cluster	
24th Infantry Regiment Badge Valorous Unit Award	Army Commendation Medal	National Defense Service Medal	Global War on Terrorism Expeditionary Medal	
24th Infantry Regiment Badge Valorous Unit Award	Global War on Terrorism Service Medal	Army Service Ribbon	Army Overseas Service Ribbon	
25th Infantry Division Badge		Ranger Tab	Special Operations Diver Badge	Parachutist Badge
