= Shay Oberg =

American softball player

Shay Oberg (born 1986 or 1987) is an American former softball player who played during the 2000s in Montana and Oregon. After playing softball in high school, Oberg attended Southwestern Oregon Community College from 2006 to 2007. With Southwestern Oregon, Oberg earned a Northwest Athletic Association of Community Colleges second team honor in 2006 and had a .275 batting average in 2007. After joining the Montana State Billings Yellowjackets in 2008, Oberg had three home runs and thirteen RBIs for a .280 batting average. That year, Oberg was the recipient of the Best Female Athlete with a Disability ESPY Award. In her final year with Montana State, Oberg scored three home runs and sixteen RBIs for a .271 batting average. During her time with Montana State, Oberg overall had a .957 fielding average, which consisted of sixty-two putouts, three errors and five assists.

== Biography ==
In the late 1980s, Oberg was born in Great Falls, Montana without a left arm and spent some of her childhood in Langley, Virginia. As a child in Montana, Oberg played multiple sports including softball and basketball. During high school, Oberg played softball at Charles M. Russell High School before moving with her family to Billings, Montana in 2003. With Billings West High School, Oberg began with a batting average around .100 in 2004. In 2005, Oberg had a .333 batting average and named the top offensive player for Billings West. Apart from softball, Oberg was on the basketball team for Billings West until she was let go from the team due to her disability.

In 2006, Oberg was on the Southwestern Oregon Community College softball team and earned a second-team honor from the Northwest Athletic Association of Community Colleges. Near the end of the 2007 season, Oberg had five RBIs with a .275 batting average. In June 2007, it was reported that Oberg would leave Southwestern Oregon and continue her softball career with the Montana State Billings Yellowjackets. As a switch hitter for Montana State in 2008, Oberg had thirteen RBIs and three home runs for a .280 batting average. That year, Oberg won the Best Female Athlete with a Disability ESPY Award. In 2009, Oberg had sixteen RBIs and three home runs for a .271 batting average during her final year as a college softball player. With her two years at Montana State, Oberg had sixty-two putouts, five assists and three errors for an overall fielding average of .957. While continuing to play softball after college, Oberg planned to work in couples therapy after completing a Master of Psychology.
