= 2009 ESPY Awards =

Athletic awards show

The 2009 ESPY Awards (for the 2008 Olympics and the 2009) were announced from Nokia Theatre on July 15 and showed during the telecast on ESPN, July 19. It was co-presented by Under Armour and Land Rover.

== Voting ==
The ESPY nomination show was televised on Friday, June 26, 2009, at 8 p.m. ET on ESPN2. Fans voted online at www.espys.tv or via mobile phone at www.espn.mobi. The voting started on June 25 and ended on July 11, 2009.

== Categories ==
There are 37 categories and 3 special awards. The winners are listed first in bold. Other nominees are in alphabetical order.

Best Male Athlete	Best Female Athlete
**Michael Phelps — Swimming**; Kobe Bryant — NBA Basketball; LeBron James — NBA Basketball; Jimmie Johnson — Auto Racing	**Nastia Liukin — Gymnastics**; Natalie Coughlin — Swimming; Maya Moore — NCAA Basketball; Candace Parker — WNBA Basketball; Serena Williams — Tennis
Best Moment	Best Team
**US Swim team wins thrilling finish in Olympic relay**; Tim Tebow’s speech; Hélio Castroneves wins the Indy 500	**Los Angeles Lakers**; Connecticut Huskies women's basketball; North Carolina Tar Heels men's basketball; Philadelphia Phillies; Pittsburgh Penguins; Pittsburgh Steelers
Best Coach-Manager	Best Game
**Phil Jackson — Los Angeles Lakers**; Geno Auriemma — Connecticut Huskies women's basketball; Dan Bylsma — Pittsburgh Penguins; Joe Maddon — Tampa Bay Rays; Mike Tomlin — Pittsburgh Steelers	**Pittsburgh Steelers vs. Arizona Cardinals, Super Bowl XLIII**; Roger Federer vs. Rafael Nadal, 2008 Wimbledon Final; Syracuse vs. Connecticut, 2009 Big East Tournament Quarterfinals
Best Championship Performance	Best Play
**Michael Phelps — Swimming**; Kobe Bryant - Los Angeles Lakers; Cole Hamels - Philadelphia Phillies; Misty May-Treanor & Kerri Walsh — Beach Volleyball	**Roethlisberger to Holmes, Super Bowl XLIII Winning Touchdown**; Alexander Ovechkin vs. New York Rangers; Pacquiao KO’s Hatton; Texas Tech’s Michael Crabtree makes game-winning catch vs. Texas
Best Upset	Best Breakthrough Athlete
**United States Soccer shocks Spain in the Confederations Cup semifinals**; Mine That Bird; Oregon State stuns then #1 USC Trojans; Tampa Bay Rays win the American League Championship Series	**Matt Ryan — Atlanta Falcons**; Shawn Johnson — Gymnastics; Evan Longoria — Tampa Bay Rays; Derrick Rose — Chicago Bulls
Best Record Breaking Performance	Best Sports Movie
**Michael Phelps — Swimming**; Usain Bolt — Track & Field; Larry Fitzgerald — Arizona Cardinals; Phil Jackson — Los Angeles Lakers	**The Express: The Ernie Davis Story**; Sugar (2008 film); The Wrestler (2008 film)
Best Male College Athlete	Best Female College Athlete
**Tim Tebow — Florida Gators football**; Sam Bradford — Oklahoma Sooners football; Matt Gilroy — Boston University Hockey; Blake Griffin — Oklahoma Sooners men's basketball; Stephen Strasburg — San Diego State Baseball	**Maya Moore — Connecticut Huskies women's basketball**; Kerri Hanks — Notre Dame Women's Soccer; Courtney Kupets — Georgia Gymnastics; Danielle Lawrie — Washington Softball; Dana Vollmer — California Swimming
Best Male Athlete With A Disability	Best Female Athlete With A Disability
**Jason Lester — Ironman**; Jeremy Campbell — Track & Field; Will Groulx — Wheelchair Rugby; Oscar Pistorius — Track & Field	**Erin Popovich — Swimming**; Jessica Long — Swimming; Maureen McKinnon-Tucker — Sailing; Asya Miller — Goalball
Best Male International Athlete	Best Female International Athlete
**Usain Bolt (JAM), Track & Field**; Pau Gasol (ESP), Basketball; Lionel Messi (ARG), Soccer; Rafael Nadal (ESP), Tennis; Cristiano Ronaldo (POR), Soccer	**Lorena Ochoa (MEX), Golf**; Yelena Isinbayeva (RUS), Pole Vault; Marta (BRA), Soccer; Stephanie Rice (AUS), Swimming; Dinara Safina (RUS), Tennis
Best MLB Player	Best NBA Player
**Albert Pujols — St. Louis Cardinals**; Roy Halladay — Toronto Blue Jays; Ryan Howard — Philadelphia Phillies; Dustin Pedroia — Boston Red Sox; Francisco Rodriguez — Los Angeles Angels/New York Mets	**LeBron James — Cleveland Cavaliers**; Kobe Bryant — Los Angeles Lakers; Dwight Howard — Orlando Magic; Dwyane Wade — Miami Heat
Best WNBA Player	Best NFL Player
**Candace Parker — Los Angeles Sparks**; Deanna Nolan — Detroit Shock; Diana Taurasi — Phoenix Mercury; Lindsay Whalen — Connecticut Sun	**Larry Fitzgerald — Arizona Cardinals**; James Harrison — Pittsburgh Steelers; Peyton Manning — Indianapolis Colts; Adrian Peterson — Minnesota Vikings; Kurt Warner — Arizona Cardinals
Best NHL Player	Best MLS Player
**Sidney Crosby — Pittsburgh Penguins**; Pavel Datsyuk — Detroit Red Wings; Evgeni Malkin — Pittsburgh Penguins; Alexander Ovechkin — Washington Capitals	**Landon Donovan — Los Angeles Galaxy**; Juan Pablo Angel — New York Red Bulls; Jon Busch — Chicago Fire; Kenny Cooper — FC Dallas; Guillermo Barros Schelotto — Columbus Crew
Best Male Action Sports Athlete	Best Female Action Sports Athlete
**Shaun White — Snowboarding/Skateboarding**; Ryan Sheckler — Skateboarding; Kelly Slater — Surfing; James Stewart Jr. — Motocross	**Maya Gabeira — Surfing**; Torah Bright — Snowboarding; Sarah Burke — Skiing; Ashley Fiolek — Motocross
Best US Male Olympian	Best US Female Olympian
**Michael Phelps — Swimming**; Bryan Clay — Track & Field; LaShawn Merritt — Track & Field; Angelo Taylor — Track & Field	**Shawn Johnson — Gymnastics**; Natalie Coughlin — Swimming; Dawn Harper — Track & Field; Nastia Liukin — Gymnastics
Best Bowler	Best Driver
**Norm Duke**; Chris Barnes; Wes Malott	**Jimmie Johnson**; Hélio Castroneves; Scott Dixon; Lewis Hamilton; Tony Schumacher
Best Fighter	Best Male Golfer
**Manny Pacquiao — Boxing**; Lyoto Machida — MMA; Shane Mosley — Boxing; Anderson Silva — MMA	**Tiger Woods**; Pádraig Harrington; Phil Mickelson
Best Female Golfer	Best Jockey
**Lorena Ochoa**; Paula Creamer; Suzann Pettersen	**Calvin Borel**; Garrett Gomez; Mike Smith
Best Male Tennis Player	Best Female Tennis Player
**Roger Federer**; Rafael Nadal	**Serena Williams**; Svetlana Kuznetsova; Dinara Safina
Under Armour All-America Moment	Special Awards
**Andre Debose & Russell Shepard — Football**; Jake Bernhardt — Lacrosse; Tara Glover — Softball; David Renfroe — Baseball; Hannah Werth — Volleyball	Arthur Ashe Courage Award: President Nelson Mandela; Jimmy V Award For Perseverance: Don Meyer, Northern State University coach; Best Comeback: Dara Torres, Swimming

== In Memoriam ==
- Ron Snidow
- Dom DiMaggio
- Gene Upshaw
- Jack Kemp
- Lou Saban
- Sammy Baugh
- Doc Blanchard
- Paul Newman
- Mark Fidrych
- Nick Adenhart
- Arturo Gatti
- Schlumbergera
- Skip Caray
- Harry Kalas
- Kay Yow
- Chuck Daly
- Steve McNair
- Alex Macgregor Gee
