= Paul Marius Martin =

French latinist

Paul Marius Martin (6 June 1940, Saint-Cloud, today Gdyel in Algeria) is a French Latinist and historian of ancient Rome. He was professor of Latin language and literature at the Paul Valéry University, Montpellier III. He is a specialist of the history of Roman Kingdom and Roman Republic, the historiography of the first centuries of Rome and of the Roman monarchical ideology.

== Publications ==
- L’idée de royauté à Rome (series "Miroir des Civilisations antiques", 1-2), volume I, De la Rome royale au consensus républicain, preface by Raymond Bloch, Clermont-Ferrand, Adosa, 1982, 410 p., 18 tableaux, 2 maps ISBN 2-86639-020-2; volume II, Haine de la royauté et séductions monarchiques (du IVe au principat augustéen), Clermont-Ferrand, Adosa, 1994, 510 p., 8 tableaux ISBN 2-86639-021-0.
- La Campanie antique, des origines à l’éruption du Vésuve, Clermont-Ferrand, Adosa, 1985, 152 p. ISBN 2-86639-080-6
- 44. Tuer César ! (series "La Mémoire des siècles"), Brussels, Complexe, 1988, 221 p. ISBN 2-87-027248-0 (partially online).
- Antoine et Cléopâtre : la fin d'un rêve, Paris, Albin Michel, 1990 ISBN 2-226-03959-7; 2e éd., Brussels, Complexe (series "Historiques"), 1995, 285 p., 4 maps, 3 tableaux ISBN 2-87-027579-X (partially online).
- La Guerre des Gaules – La Guerre civile (series "Les Textes fondateurs"), Paris, Ellipses, 2000, 192 p. ISBN 978-2-7298-4922-1
- Vercingétorix, le politique, le stratège, Paris, Perrin, 2000, 263 p. ISBN 2-262-01691-7; 2nd edition augmented, Perrin, 2009; 3rd ed. poche (series "Tempus"), Perrin, 2013 ISBN 978-2-262-04139-7 (partially online).
- L’explication de texte latin aux concours (Agrégations - C.A.P.E.S - Chartes - E.N.S. / Lettres classiques, Lettres Modernes, Grammaire, Philosophie, Espagnol, Portugais), Paris, Ellipses, 1995, 212 p. ISBN 978-2-7298-4591-9

== Bibliography ==
- Olivier Devillers et Jean Meyers (éd.), Pouvoirs des hommes, pouvoir des mots, des Gracques à Trajan. Hommages au professeur Paul Marius Martin (« Bibliothèque d’Études classiques », 54), Louvain, Peeters, 2009, XXIV-624 p., avec une préface de Jacqueline Dangel présentant la carrière et l'œuvre de P. M. Martin et une bibliographie exhaustive de ses travaux. ISBN 978-90-429-2007-1
