= Ryan Kocer =

Ryan Kocer is a family nurse and former wrestler from Wagner Community School in Wagner, South Dakota. His left leg was amputated below the knee following an accident in 2007. In 2008, Kocer won the Best Male Athlete with a Disability ESPY Award.

== Early life ==
Ryan Kocer is the oldest of three boys (Alex and David) and one sister (Kayli), parents are Jody and Don Kocer. Ryan started wrestling at the age of 4 in an AAU youth wrestling program. Kocer was also a three-year starter for the Wagner Community School football team. Kocer started and ended his high school wrestling career at Wagner Community School. Kocer won his first South Dakota High School Activities Association wrestling state title of three in eighth grade at 130 weight class. Kocer's freshman year ended with a second-place finish after sustaining a knee injury. Sophomore and Junior year, he picked up his second and third title at 152 and 171 respectively.

=== Accident ===
On the night of August 25, 2007, Kocer was pushing a two-ton diesel truck in neutral out of the yard of his home, to keep his parents from waking up. While pushing, Kocer lost control and was trapped between the truck and a grain bin. His left kneecap was damaged to the point that blood flow became non-existent in his lower leg. Kocer was taken to the clinic in town before he was airlifted to Sioux Falls, South Dakota, for treatment. Kocer underwent 10 hours of surgery to remove his left foot. Doctors became concerned about possible infections and the condition of his knee, that they finally amputated the left leg above the knee.

Kocer also sustained injury to the right tibia and doctors placed a rod in his right leg. It took Kocer eight weeks to stand on his right leg with the aid of crutches.

== Athletic career ==
Kocer's first match after the injury was at the Clash in Minnesota. Kocer finished the day with a 3–1 record. Kocer earned his 200th victory during his senior season. Ryan Kocer's senior record was 16–7, finishing fourth at the state tournament helping Wagner win a team state title.

Kocer won the Best Male Athlete with a Disability ESPY Award in 2008.

== Mentor ==
Kocer attended college at South Dakota State University, where he studied and earned his degree in nursing. He has obtained his Family Nurse Practitioners license and is employed with Avera Health. Kocer has been a mentor to other amputees.
