= Paul Martin (civil servant) =

British politician

Interim Chief Executive of the Government of Jersey
- In office March 2021 – February 2022

Chief Executive of Wandsworth London Borough Council
- In office October 2010 – March 2021

Chief Executive of Richmond upon Thames London Borough Council
- In office 2016 – March 2021

Interim Chief Executive of Ealing London Borough Council
- In office February 2022 – July 2022

Interim Chief Executive of Bristol City Council
- In office June 2024 – January 2025

Interim Chief Executive of Newham London Borough Council
- In office July 2025 – August 2026

Paul Martin is a British civil servant who has served as the interim Chief Executive Officer of the Government of Jersey in the Channel Islands since 1 March 2021. He has worked in local government and the UK Civil Service for more than 38 years (as of 2021).

Martin previously worked as the Chief Executive for both the Richmond and Wandsworth Councils. He announced his resignation from that role in February 2020. He initially joined Wandsworth Council in 2010 and, due to a shared staffing agreement, became the Chief Executive of Richmond Council in 2016. The Leader of Richmond Council described him as "a steady hand on the tiller".

== Career ==
Initially a librarian, he is considered to be one of the most experienced council Chief Executives in the UK, having working the civil services of the Sutton Council and a number of councils in Great Manchester, the Midlands, East Anglia and London.

In 2014, it was revealed that Martin, at the time the chief executive for just Wandsworth Council, had a £230,440 total pay package, including salary and bonuses, higher than the British Prime Minister's. The salary was brought to light during a council meeting where the leader of the council's opposition Rex Osborne said that "council tax is going on the absurdly high pay of senior staff while everything else is just being cut".

Martin became the Chief Executive Officer of Jersey on 1 March 2021 on a 12-month contract. This is the highest civil service position on the island. The vacancy of this position came after a controversy involving the previous Chief Executive, who had taken a secondary job as a non-executive director of a UK real estate firm.
