= 2010 ESPY Awards =

Athletic awards show

The 18th ESPY Awards were held on July 14, 2010, at the Nokia Theatre, hosted by Seth Meyers. For the first time since 2003 (when the ceremony was aired on a delay several days later), ESPN televised the ceremony live.

== Categories ==
There are 37 categories and 3 special awards. The winners are listed first in bold. Other nominees are in alphabetical order.

Best Male Athlete	Best Female Athlete
**Drew Brees – NFL Football**; Kobe Bryant – NBA Basketball; LeBron James – NBA Basketball; Jimmie Johnson – Auto Racing; Albert Pujols – MLB Baseball	**Lindsey Vonn – Skiing**; Maya Moore – NCAA Basketball; Diana Taurasi – WNBA Basketball; Serena Williams – Tennis
Best Moment	Best Team
**Landon Donovan – Goal vs. Algeria**; Phil Mickelson – 2010 Masters; Joannie Rochette – 2010 Winter Olympics; New Orleans Saints – Super Bowl XLIV	**New Orleans Saints**; Alabama Crimson Tide football; Chicago Blackhawks; Los Angeles Lakers; Connecticut Huskies women's basketball; New York Yankees
Best Coach-Manager	Best Game
**Phil Jackson – Los Angeles Lakers**; Geno Auriemma – Connecticut Huskies; Mike Krzyzewski – Duke Blue Devils; Joe Girardi – New York Yankees; Sean Payton – New Orleans Saints; Nick Saban – Alabama Crimson Tide	**Canada edges United States – Olympic hockey championship game in overtime**; Twins beat Tigers in Extra Innings – AL Central One-Game Tiebreak; Duke Blue Devils gets past Butler Bulldogs – Men's NCAA Championship
Best Championship Performance	Castrol Edge Performance Under Pressure Award
**Drew Brees – NFL American football**; Anthony Johnson – Big Sky Conference Championship; Michael Phelps – Swimming; Shaun White – Winter Olympics	**Landon Donovan World Cup vs. Algeria**; Sidney Crosby in the Olympic Hockey Gold Medal Game; Brett Favre in his return to Green Bay; Stephen Strasburg in MLB debut
Best Upset	Best Breakthrough Athlete
**Northern Iowa shocks No. 1 Kansas – NCAA Men's Basketball**; Frankie Edgar over B.J. Penn – MMA; Hawaii softball upsets #1 Alabama – NCAA softball; Y. E. Yang stuns Tiger Woods – PGA Championship	**Chris Johnson – Tennessee Titans**; Brittney Griner – Baylor Bears; John Wall – Kentucky Wildcats; Stephen Strasburg – Washington Nationals
Best Record Breaking Performance	Best Sports Movie
**Isner vs. (France) Mahut at Wimbledon – Longest Match in Professional Tennis History**; (Jamaica) Usain Bolt – 100 and 200-meter World Records; Brett Favre – NFL record for consecutive starts; (Switzerland) Roger Federer – Most Grand Slam singles titles; Connecticut Huskies – Longest winning streak in Women's NCAA Basketball History	**The Blind Side**; Big Fan; Invictus; The Damned United; The Karate Kid
Best Male College Athlete	Best Female College Athlete
**John Wall – Kentucky Wildcats**; Blake Geoffrion – Wisconsin Badgers; Mark Ingram II – Alabama Crimson Tide; Evan Turner – Ohio State Buckeyes; Garrett Wittels – Florida International Golden Panthers	**Maya Moore – Connecticut Huskies**; Tina Charles – Connecticut Huskies; Megan Hodge – Penn State Nittany Lions; Megan Langenfeld – UCLA Bruins
Best Male Athlete With A Disability	Best Female Athlete With A Disability
**Steve Cash – Hockey**; Rudy Garcia-Tolson – Ironman Triathlon/Swimming; Andy Soule – Nordic skiing	**Amy Palmiero-Winters – Track & Field**; Linnea Dohring – Gymnastics; Alana Nichols – Basketball; Stephani Victor – Slalom
Best NBA Player	Best WNBA Player
**Kobe Bryant – Los Angeles Lakers**; LeBron James – Cleveland Cavaliers; Dwight Howard – Orlando Magic; Dwyane Wade – Miami Heat; Kevin Durant – Oklahoma City Thunder	**Diana Taurasi – Phoenix Mercury**; Candace Parker – Los Angeles Sparks; Tamika Catchings – Indiana Fever; Becky Hammon – San Antonio Silver Stars; Lauren Jackson – Seattle Storm
Best MLB Player	Best NFL Player
**(Dominican Republic) Albert Pujols – St. Louis Cardinals**; Tim Lincecum – San Francisco Giants; Zack Greinke – Kansas City Royals; Joe Mauer – Minnesota Twins; Derek Jeter – New York Yankees	**Drew Brees – New Orleans Saints**; Brett Favre – Minnesota Vikings; Chris Johnson – Tennessee Titans; Peyton Manning – Indianapolis Colts; Darrelle Revis – New York Jets; Charles Woodson – Green Bay Packers
Best NHL Player	Best MLS Player
**(Canada) Sidney Crosby – Pittsburgh Penguins**; Ryan Miller – Buffalo Sabres; (Sweden) Henrik Sedin – Vancouver Canucks; (Russia) Alexander Ovechkin – Washington Capitals; (Canada) Steven Stamkos – Tampa Bay Lightning	**Landon Donovan – Los Angeles Galaxy**; Conor Casey – Colorado Rapids; (Jamaica) Jeff Cunningham – FC Dallas; (Grenada) Shalrie Joseph – New England Revolution; Kasey Keller – Seattle Sounders FC
Best Male Action Sports Athlete	Best Female Action Sports Athlete
**Shaun White – Snowboarding**; Bobby Brown – Freestyle Skiing; Ryan Dungey – Motocross; (Australia) Mick Fanning – Surfing; Garrett Reynolds – BMX	**(Australia) Torah Bright – Snowboarding**; (Australia) Stephanie Gilmore – Surfing; (Canada) Ashleigh McIvor – Freestyle Skiing; Jen Hudak – Freestyle Skiing; Ashley Fiolek – Motocross
Best US Male Olympian	Best US Female Olympian
**Shaun White – Snowboarding**; Apolo Anton Ohno – Speedskating; Shani Davis – Speedskating; Evan Lysacek – Figure Skating; Bode Miller – Skiing	**Lindsey Vonn – Skiing**; Hannah Kearney – Skiing; Julia Mancuso – Skiing
Best Bowler	Best Driver
**Walter Ray Williams Jr.**; Kelly Kulick; Bill O'Neill	**Jimmie Johnson**; Kyle Busch; (United Kingdom) Dario Franchitti; Ron Hornaday Jr.; Tony Schumacher
Best Fighter	Best Jockey
**Floyd Mayweather Jr. – Boxing**; (Philippines) Manny Pacquiao – Boxing; (Canada) Georges St-Pierre – MMA	**Calvin Borel**; (France) Julien Leparoux; Mike Smith
Best Male Golfer	Best Female Golfer
**Phil Mickelson**; Tiger Woods; (South Africa) Ernie Els	(Mexico) **Lorena Ochoa**; Cristie Kerr; Jiyai Shin
Best Male Tennis Player	Best Female Tennis Player
**(Switzerland) Roger Federer**; (Spain) Rafael Nadal; (Argentina) Juan Martín del Potro	**Venus Williams**; Serena Williams; (Belgium) Kim Clijsters

== In Memoriam ==
- Nodar Kumaritashvili
- Jose Lima
- Bob Probert
- Yeardley Love
- Chris Henry
- Gaines Adams
- Jasper Howard
- Abe Pollin
- Raymond Parks
- Juan Antonio Samaranch
- Myles Brand
- Chet Simmons
- Don Coryell
- Merlin Olsen
- Dottie Kamenshek
- Robin Roberts
- George Michael
- Manute Bol
- Ernie Harwell
- Bob Sheppard
- George Steinbrenner
- John Wooden
