= Jason P. Lester =

American endurance athlete

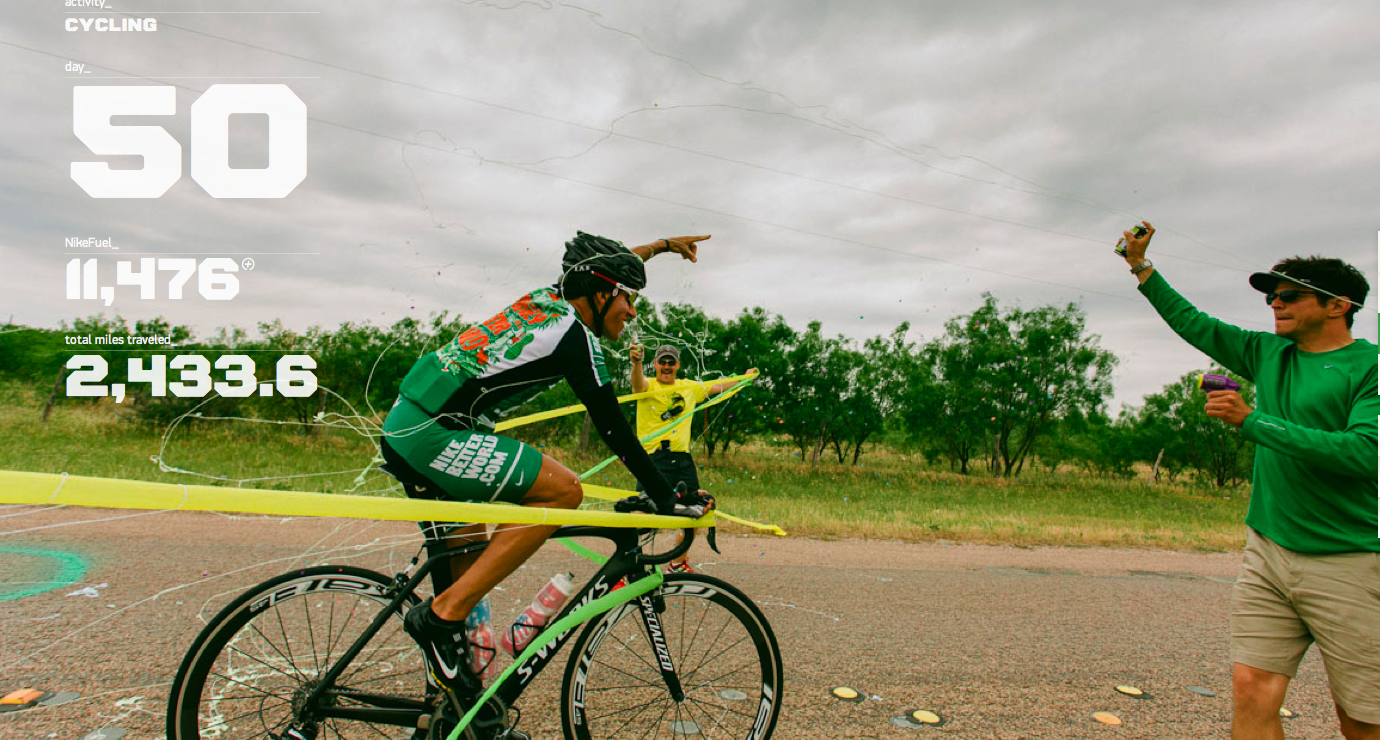
Lester hits mile 2,400 on day 50 of Journey for a Better World's 4,800 miles across the United States

Jason P. Lester is an endurance athlete, the author of the book Running on Faith, and the 2009 ESPY Award winner for Best Male Athlete with a Disability. He is the first disabled athlete to complete the Ultraman World Championships. He is the Founder of EPIC5 Challenge, EP1CMAN and The NEVER STOP Foundation.

Lester has completed endurance challenges such as the EPIC5 Challenge (5 Iron distance triathlons on 5 Hawaiian islands in 5 consecutive days), and a 1,000-mile (1,600 km) run and 4,000-mile (6,400 km) bike across the United States. On May 5, 2013, Lester ran 3,550 miles (5,710 km) across the United States, becoming the 4th fastest runner to run from San Francisco to New York City to raise money for Hurricane Sandy victims. He ran 2,600 miles (4,200 km) along The Great Wall of China in 83 days, setting a world record by becoming the first person to run the length of the wall solo in a single attempt.

== Early life ==
Lester grew up playing baseball and football. When he was twelve years old, he was hit while on his bicycle by a woman driving 70 mph (110 km/h) who ran a red light. He was left for dead with 21 broken bones and a collapsed lung. Lester lost the use of his right arm, which became partially paralyzed as a result of the accident. During the next several months he began a lengthy hospital recovery. While he was still in the hospital recovering, his father, and sole guardian, died of a heart attack. Twelve months after the accident, he went on to continue to play baseball and football, making the all star game with the use of only one arm. Lester continued to play sports throughout high school and college. He began to compete in running and biathlon races at age 16, and by age 18 was ranked #2 for biathlons in the state of Arizona.

== Triathlon ==
Lester competed in the 2008 and 2009 Ironman World Championships in Kona. In 2008, Lester became the first disabled athlete to complete the Ultraman World Championships. In June 2009, at Ironman 70.3 Hawaii, Lester came in 3rd in his age group, which qualified him to compete in the Ironman World Championships later that year. That same summer, in July 2009, Lester became the first male triathlete to win an ESPY Award. In August 2009, Lester became the 25th person to complete both Ultraman Canada and Ultraman Hawaii out of 428 total competitors. In November 2009, Lester became the 15th athlete in the history of Ultraman to complete both Hawaii and Canada in the same year.

On March 19, 2012, Lester ran and biked over 4,800 miles (7,700 km) across the United States promoting the benefit of the sport.

On May 5, 2013, Lester made a 3,500-mile (5,600 km) transcontinental run across America in 72 days. The run was a collaborative service project with Waves For Water. Waves For Water is an active presence and force for the Hurricane Sandy Relief Initiative, which supports neighborhoods and communities recovering from Hurricane Sandy.

== The NEVER STOP Foundation ==
In 2007, Lester founded the Never Stop Foundation. The NEVER STOP Foundation aims to use athletics as a tool to encourage young people to achieve their full potential.

== Racing and endurance highlights ==
- RUNAUS — The first American male to run across Australia. Jason P. Lester's Trans Australia Run started in Scarborough Beach, Western Australia and ended 135 days later in Batemans Bay, New South Wales. (August 2016)
- 72 consecutive hour run - 2014
- Run Across America Ran 3,550 miles across the United States (July 2013)
- The Great Wall Run – first person to run 2,500 miles (4,000 km) along The Great Wall of China in 83 days solo in a single attempt (2014)
- Ran 3,550 miles (5,710 km) across the United States in 72 consecutive days. Lester became the 4th-fastest runner to run from San Francisco City Hall to New York City Hall (The official USA Crosser's route) 2013
- Ran 110 miles (180 km) in 24 hours on a treadmill in 2013
- Completed three consecutive iron distance triathlons in 52 hours, 2012
- Ran 26 marathons in 26 consecutive days, 2012
- Ran and biked 4,800 miles (7,700 km) from Manhattan, NY to Portland, OR, 16 States - 102 days, 2012
- Ran 316 miles (509 km) from Las Vegas to Mt. Whitney, 2011 (1st male athlete to complete)
- EPIC5- 5 Iron Distance Triathlons | 5 Hawaiian Islands, 2010, 2011, 2012
- Ultraman Canada, 2008 (4th place overall in the run, 2009 (14th place overall)
- Ultraman Hawaii World Championships, 2008 (24th overall), 2009 (18th overall), 2010
- Ironman World Championship, 2008, 2009
- Ironman Arizona, 2007, 2008
- Ironman Western Australia, 2007
- 70.3 Honolulu, 2009 (3rd in age group, and qualified for Ironman World Championships), 2010
- Ultramarathon – Hilo to Volcano, 2008 (9th place overall)
- UItramarathon – Western States 100, 2009 (pacer)
- UItramarathon – Badwater Ultramarathon 135, 2011 (pacer)
- ITU Triathlon World Championships, 2007 (6th place), 2008 (2nd in category)
- The Nautica New York City Triathlon, 2007 (2nd in category)
- Duathlon – Pac Crest Endurance, 2008 (3rd in age group)
- Scottsdale Duathlon, 2005, (1st in age group, 2nd overall)

== Awards ==
- Most Inspirational People In Health And Fitness | AskMen.com, 2016
- ESPY Award Winner - Best Male Athlete with a Disability, 2009
- USAT (USA Triathlon) PC Athlete of the Year, 2008
- USAT (USA Triathlon) PC Athlete of the Year Finalist, 2007
