= Dallas Friday =

American wakeboarder (born 1986)

- Born: Dallas Jacqueline Friday; September 6, 1986 (age 39)
- Origin: Orlando, Florida, U.S.
- Occupation: Wakeboard
- Years active: 2000 - present
- Website: http://www.dallasfriday.com/bio.html

Dallas Friday (born 6 September 1986) is an American wakeboarder. Her competition victories include four X Games gold medals and several World Wakeboarding Titles. She has also won the ESPN ESPY Award for Best Female Action Sports Athlete.

== Career ==
Friday began wakeboarding aged thirteen, and began competing professionally within a year. In her rookie season she won the Americas Cup title and a silver medal at the X Games, where she was the youngest competitor.

Aged fourteen, Friday won gold at the ESPN X-Games and at the NBC Gravity Games. In 2001, she won the World Cup and placed first in the 2001 Malibu Open, the first two Pro tour stops, the Vans Triple Crown Ford Ranger Pro, Cable Wakeboarding Nationals, and the X-cup. In the 2003-2004 season, Friday won all but one professional event, and in 2005 she won her third gold at the X Games. In 2006, Friday won the World, Nationals, Masters and the Pro Tour Championships, and in 2007 she was undefeated in overseas Wakeboarding World Cup events. Friday won the "Queen of Wake" title in 2009, as well as the World Title. In 2010 Friday suffered severe injuries that required 2 years of rehabilitation causing her to miss the 2011 season.

== Other activities ==
In 2004, she made a guest appearance in the popular television series Kim Possible.

She is named after Dallas, a small town in North Carolina where her father was raised.

== Competition history ==
2013: World title

Year 2008: Injured part of season

First Place | Masters Champion
First Place | IWSF World Cup Champion
Second Place | Pro Tour - Twin Cities, Minnesota
Second Place | World Championships - Oklahoma
First Place | World Cup Singapore
First Place | Malibu Open
Second Place | Pro Tour - Fort Worth, Tx
Second Place | Wakeboard World Cup - Doha, Qatar

Year 2007: Injured part of season

First Place | Pro-Am Wakeboarding Champion
First Place | Wakeboard World Cup - Doha, Qatar
Second Place | Wakeboarding Nationals Champion
Second Place | Masters Champion
First Place | Wakeboard World Cup - Singapore
First Place | IWSF World Cup Champion
Second Place | Wakeboarding World Champion

Year 2006:

First Place | Pro Wakeboard Tour - Acworth, GA
First Place | Wakeboard World Cup - Doha, Qatar
First Place | Masters Tournament - Callaway, GA
First Place | USA Nationals - Polk City, FL
Second Place | Pro Tour - Reno, NV
First Place | Wakeboard World Cup - China
First Place | Pro Tour Champion
First Place | WWA Nationals - Kenosha, WI
First Place | WWA Worlds - Fort Worth, TX
Second Place | Wakeboard World Cup - Singapore

Year 2005:

First Place | Pro Wakeboard Tour - Orlando, FL
First Place | Masters Callaway Gardens - Georgia
First Place | Pro Wakeboard Tour Reno - Nevada
First Place | Pro Tour Champion
First Place | X-Games - Los Angeles, CA
First Place | Wakestock - UK
First Place | Nationals Champion - Wisconsin
First Place | Pan American Champion - Orlando, FL

Year 2004:

First Place | X-Games - Los Angeles, CA
First Place | Gravity Games - Perth, Australia
First Place | Masters Callaway Gardens - Georgia
First Place | Vans Triple Crown
First Place | World Cup
First Place | Pro Tour Champion
First Place | World Champion
First Place | National Champion
First Place | Malibu Open - Sacramento, CA
First Place | Orlando Pro Tour Stop
First Place | Vans Triple Crown - Portland, Oregon
First Place | U.S. Open Champion
Second Place | Pro Tour Stop - Reno, NV

Year 2003:

First Place | X-Games - Los Angeles CA
First Place | Nationals Vans Triple Crown - Indianapolis
First Place | World Cup
First Place | Vans Triple Crown
First Place | Worlds Vans Triple Crown - Orlando
First Place | Masters Champion
First Place | Pro Tour Stop - Orlando
First Place | Vans Ford Ranger Pro - Dallas
First Place | Pro Tour Stop - Portland
First Place | Overall Pro Tour Champion
First Place | Malibu Open Champion - Sacramento
First Place | Betty Series Champion - Orlando
Fourth Place | Gravity Games - Cleveland OH

Year 2002:

First Place | Van's Triple Crown U.S. Nationals
First Place | Pro Tour Stop - Orlando
Third Place | Van's Triple Crown Series - Pensacola
Third Place | Pro Tour Standing
Silver Medallist | X-Games - Philadelphia, Pa
Bronze Medallist | Gravity Games - Cleveland
First Place | Wakestock - Canada
First Place | Vans Triple Crown Series Champion
Third Place | Vans Triple Crown Worlds
Third Place | World Cup Standings

Year 2001:

Ranked #1 World Cup standings
First Place | US Pro Wakeboard Tour - Orlando
First Place | US Pro Wakeboard Tour - Ft. Lauderdale
First Place | Vans Ford Ranger Pro - Pensacola
First Place | X-Cup - Orlando
First Place | X games qualifier - Ft. Lauderdale
First Place | Malibu Open - Joliet, Illinois
Second Place | US Pro Wakeboard Tour - Portland
Second Place | Pro Tour Standing for 2001
Second Place | U.S. Nationals - Orlando
First Place | X-Games Gold Medallist - Philadelphia, Pa
First Place | Gravity Games Gold - Providence, RI
First Place | Cable Wakeboarding Nationals - Orlando
Second Place | World Championships - California
First Place | World Cup Champion

Rookie Year 2000:

First Place | America's Cup Championship
Second Place | X-Games
Third Place | Pro Wakeboard National Championships
Fourth Place | Gravity Games
Fourth rank | World Cup Standings
Fifth rank | US Pro Wakeboard Tour

== See also ==
- Masters Tournament (water ski)
