= Paul Martin (amputee athlete) =

Amputee athlete, Author

Paul Martin (born June 21, 1967) is an American amputee athlete, Paralympian, speaker, and author. Paul is considered one of the foremost amputee triathletes in history and holds or has held several records in various events.

== Biography ==
Paul Martin's left leg was amputated in 1992, when he was twenty-five years old, following a car accident. He began serious sports training almost immediately afterwards, and ran his first sprint-distance triathlon (.45 mile swim, 12.4 mile bike, 3.1 mile run) in 1995. He soon turned to the far more grueling Olympic-distance (0.93 mile swim, 24.8 mile bike, 6.2 mile run) and eventually, the Ironman-distance triathlon (2.4 mile swim, 112 mile bike, 26 mile run).

In 1997, Paul was named the USA Triathlon Olympic-Distance National Champion for the first time; he has since won it five more times (1998, 2001, 2005, 2006, 2007). He also won the silver medal in the lower extremity athlete division at the International Triathlon Union World Championships. For his accomplishments, Paul was named the US Olympic Committee's Disabled Athlete of the Year.

In 1998, Paul's comeback from his devastating injury continued as he participated in the ITU World Championships again, this time taking the gold medal. He also won bronze in the road race at the IPC Disabled Cycling World Championships and finished fourth in the time trials. In addition, Paul was named to the US Disabled Alpine Ski Team.

Paul set a standard in 1999 when he became the first amputee to ever complete "The Double"—the famous Ironman World Championship in Hawaii followed by the XTERRA World Championship off-road triathlon a week later.

In 2000, Paul participated in the Paralympic Games for the first time as part of the US Cycling Team, finishing 4th in the kilo, 6th in the pursuit, and 7th in the road race.

2001 saw Paul set another milestone as he became the first lower-extremity amputee to participate in an adventure race, the Expedition BVI. Paul was also named to the US Amputee Hockey Team for the first of four straight years, and won the gold medal for the second time at the ITU World Championships.

In 2002, Paul was named Disabled Cycling Time Trial World Champion and won a silver medal at the ITU World Championships.

Paul continued his athletic excellence in 2004 by running the Boston Marathon in a personal best 3:24:49 and the Silver Strand Half-Marathon/Leg Amputee National Championships in 1:28:04, netting a silver medal in the process. He was named to the Paralympic Cycling Team for the second time, winning silver in the team sprint and bronze in the individual pursuit. For these achievements, Paul was named Competitor Magazine's Endurance Awards “Challenged Athlete of the Year."

2005 was a career year for Paul. He took the gold medal for the third time at the ITU World Championships and ran the Bolder Boulder 10K road race in a personal-best 39:18. However, his most impressive performance of the year was finishing the Ironman Coeur d’Alene in Idaho in 10:09:17, which is the current Ironman world record for leg amputees. He was then named the Challenged Athletes Foundation "Most Inspirational Athlete" of the year and was nominated for an ESPN ESPY award in the Best Male Athlete with a Disability category.

Paul has since remained active, participating in numerous triathlon, running, and cycling events. He has finished a total of ten Ironman triathlons over his career and has written two books, "One Man's Leg" and "Drinking out of My Leg," both of which detail his life and athletic accomplishments as an amputee. He is supplied with custom prosthetic legs for running and cycling by A Step Ahead Prosthetics in Hicksville, NY and is a member of Team A Step Ahead, a group of elite amputee athletes sponsored by A Step Ahead Prosthetics.
