= Ashley Fiolek =

American motorcycle racer

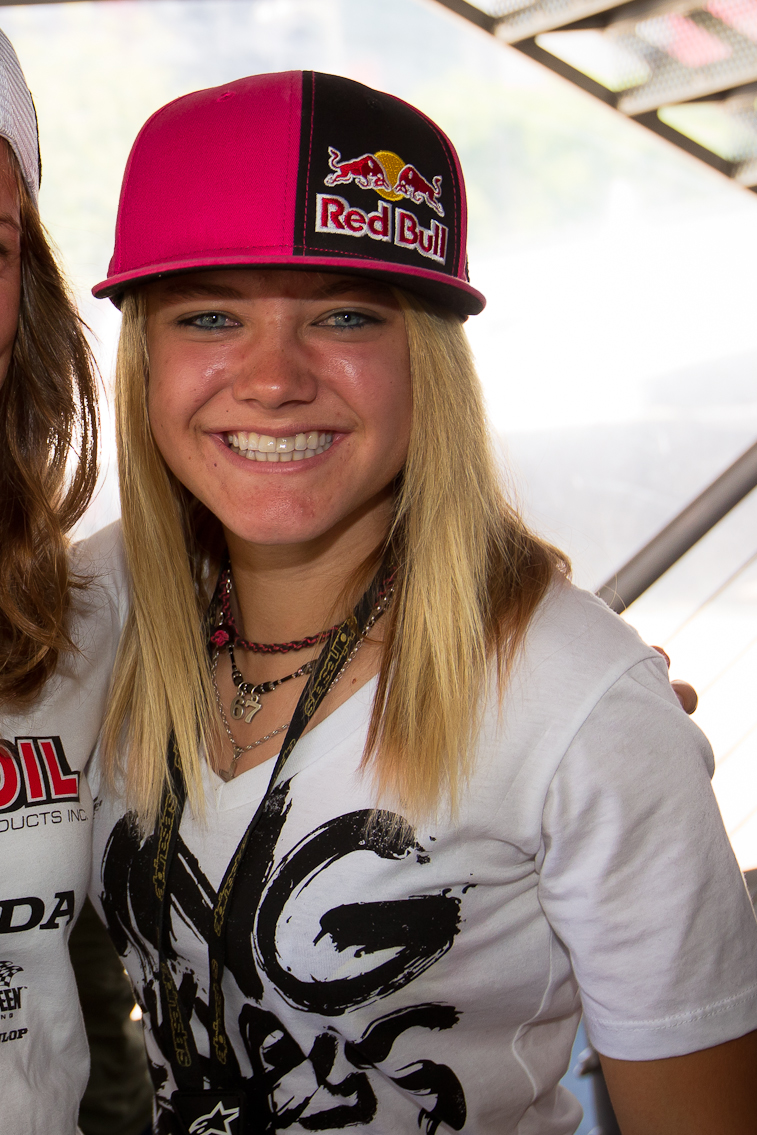
- Fiolek in 2011
- Born: October 22, 1990 (age 35) Dearborn, Michigan, U.S.

Motocross career
- Years active: 2008–2012
- Teams: Honda
- Championships: WMA - 2008, 2009, 2011, 2012
- Wins: 19

Ashley Fiolek (born October 22, 1990) is an American former professional motocross racer and current stunt actor. She competed in the AMA Motocross Championships from 2008 to 2012. Fiolek, who is culturally deaf and who communicates via American Sign Language, is notable for being a four-time AMA women's motocross national champion.

== Early life ==
Fiolek was born in Dearborn, Michigan, and has been deaf since birth, but her parents didn't realize until she was about three years old. In August 1998, the Fiolek family, moved to St. Augustine, Florida, so Ashley could attend the Florida School for the Deaf and Blind, the largest school of this type in the United States. At the school, she studied ballet, ran track and played basketball. When Fiolek finished eighth grade, her parents decided to begin homeschooling her.

As a child, Fiolek's family often went to her grandfather's cabin in Wolverine, Michigan, and rode through the woods for hours. Around the age of three, Fiolek's parents gave her a Yamaha PW50, a bike suitable for very young riders. She rode that for several years, with training wheels, accompanied by her parents.

Fiolek has a dog named Bambi.

== Career ==
Fiolek began racing at age seven. She was the 2008 WMX Pro National champion after her first professional win at the WMA Pro National Hangtown. She also won many races in the 2009 season, including Moto 1 at Hangtown and both motos at Glen Helen. She repeated as 2009 WMX Pro National Champion by finishing seventh at Steel City Raceway in Delmont, Pennsylvania, on September 5, 2009. She finished this race in pain with a collarbone fracture due to a spill during the race. She won the WMX Pro Nationals again in 2011. In 2012, she crashed and experienced a concussion and fractured tailbone. She was DNS (Did Not Start) at High Point Raceway, Mount Morris, Pennsylvania. After almost a month off between races and time to heal, she returned to racing at RedBud MX in Buchanan, Michigan, where she started her run for her next title. She took the overall in that and the following two races in Washougal, Washington, and Southwick, Massachusetts. She took the 2012 WMX Pro National Championship at Lake Elsinore, California.

In 2008, Fiolek was the first female motocross racer to make the cover of TransWorld Motocross magazine. In 2009, she became the first woman to be signed to the American Honda Racing factory team and was nominated for an ESPN ESPY Award. In September of that year she was named Deaf Person of the Month by DeafPeople.com. In 2010 Fiolek published her autobiography, Kicking Up Dirt, co-written with Caroline Ryder. In 2011 Fiolek and her motocross riding were featured in a commercial for Red Bull. She was the sixth athlete sponsored by Red Bull to appear in a commercial for the energy drink. In 2012, she was featured in an issue of Vogue magazine and presented a TEDx Talk.

In 2010, Fiolek met Noora Moghaddas (née Noora Naraghi), a top motocross competitor in the Middle East, and the two women bonded while riding and sharing similar goals to improve conditions for women and girls in their respective countries. Fiolek said, "Noora continues in her quest to help Iranian women learn how to ride, race and become stronger. I hope to be a part of that important mission with her, so that we can both share our love of motocross with people in other countries! It is great to know our world is really not that big. Even with different languages and cultures, we can all come together and share something we feel passionate about."

=== X 1Games ===
In 2009, Fiolek won her first X Games gold medal in Women's Moto x Super x at X Games 15. This made her the X Games' first deaf medalist, and the youngest-ever Women's Motocross Association champion. Fiolek won her second consecutive X Games Gold Medal in Super X Women's on July 31, 2010, at X Games 16.

In 2011, at X Games 17, Fiolek crashed during practice and was knocked unconscious. Doctors determined she would be unable to compete. In 2012, she sat out for a second consecutive year at X Games 18 after a concussion she experienced in a crash on June 2 at WMX Moto 2 in Lakewood, Colorado.

== Post WMX ==
In June 2012, Fiolek appeared on Conan, the first deaf person to be featured on the show. In September 2012, she appeared in an episode of Switched at Birth as Robin Swiller, a motocross racer who develops an interest in main character Emmett Bledsoe. The same month, she told ESPN.com: "It is my last season in the outdoor series but certainly not racing! You will have to wait until November, sorry." In 2013, she reiterated that she quit WMX.

In 2013, Fiolek played herself in No Ordinary Hero: The SuperDeafy Movie.

In July 2014, Fiolek began work as a motorcycle stunt performer for a touring Marvel Universe Live show.
