= Amy Palmiero-Winters =

American amputee distance runner

Personal information
- Born: August 18, 1972 (age 53) Meadville, Pennsylvania
- Website: www.seeamyrun.com

Sport
- Sport: Distance Runner
- Disability: Leg Amputee
- Events: Marathon; Paratriathlon; Triathlon; Ultramarathon
- Updated on July 14, 2015

Amy Palmiero-Winters (born August 18, 1972) is a below-knee amputee, long-distance runner, and triathlete. She holds eleven world records in various events. In 2010, she was awarded the James E. Sullivan Award as the top amateur athlete in the United States and the ESPN ESPY Award as the top female athlete with a disability in the world.

In 2022, Guinness World Records recognized Palmiero-Winters as the first female amputee to complete 100 miles on a treadmill, which she did in 21 hours 43 minutes 29 seconds.

== Personal life ==
Palmiero-Winters was born in Meadville, Pennsylvania, and competed in track and distance running from a young age. In 1994, she was involved in a motorcycle accident which crushed her left leg. After three years and twenty-five surgeries, her leg was amputated below the knee. She was unable to run until three years after the amputation.

== Early running career ==
In 2004, Palmiero-Winters entered the Silver Strand Marathon in San Diego. Despite being five months pregnant and running on a prosthetic leg only meant for walking, she finished second in her division. She entered the 2005 New York City Triathlon the following summer, still using a walking prosthesis as well as a bike borrowed from her employer, and placed third in her division.

At this point, Palmiero-Winters decided to engage in running on a more serious level. After obtaining a highly customized prosthetic leg for athletics, she relocated to New York in order to become a member of Team A Step Ahead, a group of amputee athletes professionally coached and sponsored.

In May 2006, Palmiero-Winters ran the New York City Marathon in 3:24 and broke the world record for a below-knee female amputee by more than twenty-five minutes. She followed this up by running the 2006 Chicago Marathon in 3:04, which stands as the best marathon time for a below-knee amputee, male or female.

== Ultramarathons ==
In 2009, Palmiero-Winters decided to switch from marathons to ultramarathons. She ran ten ultramarathons between 2009 and 2010, finishing first in the female division at the Heartland 100 Mile in October 2009 and finishing first overall at the Run to the Future 24-hour race on December 31, 2009, by running 130.4 miles during the allotted time. It was the first time an amputee had won an ultramarathon.

Palmiero-Winters was named to the US ultrarunning team for the IAU 24-Hour Ultramarathon World Championships in Brive, France in 2010. It was the first time an amputee had been named to a United States able-bodied championship team. On May 17, she finished 18th in the female division at the World Championships, running 123.99 miles.

Palmiero-Winters' next race was the Western States Endurance Run on June 26, 2010. She became the first amputee to finish the 100-mile race. By finishing in 27:43:10, she received the bronze buckle presented to runners who finish in under thirty hours.

In 2011 Palmiero-Winters became the first female amputee to finish the Badwater Ultramarathon. She had a finish time of 41:26:42.

In 2019 she became the first female amputee to finish the Marathon Des Sables.

In 2022, Palmiero-Winters completed the Cocodona 250, a 200+ mile ultramarathon in Arizona, becoming one of the first female amputees to finish a race of that distance.

== Paratriathlon ==
Palmiero-Winters won her classification at the International Triathlon Union Paratriathlon World Championships in 2005 and 2006. In 2007, Palmiero-Winters was the first athlete with a physical disability invited to race in the elite able-bodied division of the NYC Triathlon.

In 2014, Palmiero-Winters became the first amputee, male or female, to complete the Ultraman triathlon, a 3-day, 320 mile race.

== Awards ==
Palmiero-Winters was named USA Triathlon's Female Physically Challenged Athlete of the Year in 2006. She was awarded the 2009 AAU James E. Sullivan Award as the best amateur athlete in the country and also won ESPN's 2010 ESPY award as the top female athlete with a disability. In 2009, she was named the director of Team A Step Ahead.
