= 2025 ESPY Awards =

Athletic awards show

- Date: July 16, 2025
- Location: Dolby Theatre, Los Angeles
- Country: United States
- Hosted by: Shane Gillis

Television/radio coverage
- Network: ABC
- Runtime: 180 minutes

The 2025 ESPY Awards, the 33rd annual ceremony of the ESPY Awards, was held on July 16, 2025, at the Dolby Theatre in Los Angeles, and broadcast by ABC.

== Ceremony information ==
Comedian Shane Gillis hosted the ceremony.

== Winners and nominees ==
| Best Athlete, Men's Sports: Shai Gilgeous-Alexander – Oklahoma City Thunder, NBA; Josh Allen – Buffalo Bills, NFL; Shohei Ohtani – Los Angeles Dodgers, MLB; Saquon Barkley – Philadelphia Eagles, NFL | Best Athlete, Women's Sports: Simone Biles – Gymnastics; Sydney McLaughlin-Levrone – Track and Field; Gabby Thomas – Track and Field; A'ja Wilson – Las Vegas Aces, WNBA |
| Best Breakthrough Athlete: Ilona Maher – Rugby; Cooper Flagg – Duke men's basketball; Chloe Humphrey – North Carolina women's lacrosse; Paul Skenes – Pittsburgh Pirates, MLB | Best Comeback Athlete: Suni Lee – Gymnastics; Lindsey Vonn – Skiing; Gabriel Landeskog – Colorado Avalanche, NHL; Mallory Swanson – USWNT/Chicago Red Stars, NWSL |
| Best College Athlete, Men's Sports: Cooper Flagg – Duke basketball; Wyatt Hendrickson – Oklahoma State wrestling; Travis Hunter – Colorado football; CJ Kirst – Cornell lacrosse | Best College Athlete, Women's Sports: JuJu Watkins – USC basketball; Gretchen Walsh – Virginia swimming; Kate Faasse – North Carolina soccer; Olivia Babcock – Pittsburgh volleyball |
| Best Team: Philadelphia Eagles – NFL; UConn Huskies – NCAA Women's Basketball; Ohio State Buckeyes – NCAA Football; New York Liberty – WNBA; North Carolina Tar Heels – NCAA Women's Lacrosse; United States Women's National Team – Soccer; Oklahoma City Thunder – NBA; Florida Panthers – NHL; Los Angeles Dodgers – MLB | Best Championship Performance: Simone Biles – 2024 Olympics Women's All-Around; Stephen Curry – 2024 US Men's Olympic Basketball; Freddie Freeman – LA Dodgers, World Series MVP; Rory McIlroy – Wins first Masters title, completing career Grand Slam |
| Best Athlete with a Disability: Noah Elliott – Snowboard; Tatyana McFadden – Track and Field; Ezra Frech – Track and Field; Grace Norman – Paratriathlon | Best Play: Saquon Barkley's backwards hurdle – NFL; Tyrese Haliburton Calls Game – NBA Finals Game 1; Sabrina Ionescu Logo 3 Game Winner – WNBA Finals Game 3; Trinity Rodman with the OT Goal to send USWNT to the semi-finals – 2024 Olympics |
| Best Record-Breaking Performance: Alexander Ovechkin scores 895th goal to break Wayne Gretzky's NHL goals record; Caitlin Clark breaking WNBA records for single-game assists and single-season assists; Geno Auriemma wins 1,217th game to surpass Tara VanDerveer for most by any coach in NCAA basketball history; Kevin Durant breaks USA men's all-time Olympic basketball scoring record | Best NFL Player: Saquon Barkley – Philadelphia Eagles; Josh Allen – Buffalo Bills; Lamar Jackson – Baltimore Ravens; Patrick Surtain II – Denver Broncos |
| Best MLB Player: Shohei Ohtani – Los Angeles Dodgers; Aaron Judge – New York Yankees; Freddie Freeman – Los Angeles Dodgers; Tarik Skubal – Detroit Tigers | Best NHL Player: Leon Draisaitl – Edmonton Oilers; Nikita Kucherov – Tampa Bay Lightning; Cale Makar – Colorado Avalanche; Connor Hellebuyck – Winnipeg Jets |
| Best NBA Player: Shai Gilgeous-Alexander – Oklahoma City Thunder; Nikola Jokić – Denver Nuggets; Giannis Antetokounmpo – Milwaukee Bucks; Jayson Tatum – Boston Celtics | Best WNBA Player: Caitlin Clark – Indiana Fever; A'ja Wilson – Las Vegas Aces; Napheesa Collier – Minnesota Lynx; Breanna Stewart – New York Liberty |
| Best Soccer Player: Christian Pulisic – AC Milan/US; Aitana Bonmatí – FC Barcelona/Spain; Alexia Putellas – FC Barcelona/Spain; Lamine Yamal – FC Barcelona/Spain | Best Driver: Max Verstappen – Formula One; Álex Palou – IndyCar; Oscar Piastri – Formula One; Joey Logano – NASCAR |
| Best Golfer: Scottie Scheffler; Rory McIlroy; Nelly Korda; Maja Stark | Best Boxer: Katie Taylor; Claressa Shields; Naoya Inoue; Oleksandr Usyk |
| Best UFC Fighter: Merab Dvalishvili; Dricus du Plessis; Islam Makhachev; Kayla Harrison | Best Tennis Player: Coco Gauff; Jannik Sinner; Carlos Alcaraz; Aryna Sabalenka |

== Honorary awards ==
Jimmy V Award

- Katie Schumacher-Cawley

Arthur Ashe Courage Award

- Oscar Robertson

Pat Tillman Award for Service

- Los Angeles County firefighters David Walters and Erin Regan

Muhammad Ali Sports Humanitarian Award

- Sloane Stephens

Sports Humanitarian Team of the Year

- Indianapolis Colts

Icon Award

- Alex Morgan
- Diana Taurasi

Stuart Scott ENSPIRE Award

- Billy Bean

Sports Philanthropist of the Year Award

- Michele Kang

== In Memoriam ==
The segment faced criticism for not showing the names of all the athletes who died, but notable figures such as Fernando Valenzuela, Diogo Jota, and George Foreman were included. Tobe Nwigwe performed during the segment.
