= Best Female Tennis Player ESPY Award =

Annual athletic award

The Best Female Tennis Player ESPY Award has been presented annually since 1993 to the professional female tennis player adjudged to be the best in a given calendar year.

Between 1993 and 2004, the award voting panel comprised variously fans; sportswriters and broadcasters, sports executives, and retired sportspersons, termed collectively experts; and ESPN personalities, but balloting thereafter has been exclusively by fans over the Internet from amongst choices selected by the ESPN Select Nominating Committee.

Through the 2001 iteration of the ESPY Awards, ceremonies were conducted in February of each year to honor achievements over the previous calendar year; awards presented thereafter are conferred in June and reflect performance from the June previous. The award wasn't awarded in 2020 due to the COVID-19 pandemic.

Starting in 2023, the Best Male Tennis Player ESPY Award and Best Female Tennis Player ESPY Award were combined into one Best Tennis Player ESPY Award. The ESPY Award that year was presented to Novak Djokovic over finalists Carlos Alcaraz, Aryna Sabalenka, and Iga Świątek.

== List of winners ==
Year	Player	Nation represented	Other announced finalists
1993	Monica Seles	FR Yugoslavia	
1994	Steffi Graf	Germany	
1995	Arantxa Sánchez Vicario	Spain	
1996	Steffi Graf (2)	Germany	
1997	Steffi Graf (3)	Germany	
1998	Martina Hingis	Switzerland	
1999	Lindsay Davenport	United States	Martina Hingis (Switzerland); Venus Williams (United States); Serena Williams (United States)
2000	Lindsay Davenport (2)	United States	
2001	Venus Williams	United States	Lindsay Davenport (United States); Martina Hingis (Switzerland); Serena Williams (United States)
2002	Venus Williams (2)	United States	Jennifer Capriati (United States); Serena Williams (United States)
2003	Serena Williams	United States	Jennifer Capriati (United States); Kim Clijsters (Belgium); Venus Williams (United States)
2004	Serena Williams (2)	United States	Kim Clijsters (Belgium); Justine Henin-Hardenne (Belgium)
2005	Maria Sharapova	Russia	Lindsay Davenport (United States); Justine Henin-Hardenne (Belgium); Svetlana Kuznetsova (Russia); Serena Williams (United States)
2006	Venus Williams (3)	United States	Kim Clijsters (Belgium); Justine Henin-Hardenne (Belgium); Amélie Mauresmo (France)
2007	Maria Sharapova (2)	Russia	Justine Henin (Belgium); Jelena Janković (Serbia); Serena Williams (United States)
2008	Maria Sharapova (3)	Russia	Justine Henin (Belgium); Ana Ivanovic (Serbia)
2009	Serena Williams (3)	United States	Dinara Safina (Russia); Svetlana Kuznetsova (Russia)
2010	Serena Williams (4)	United States	Venus Williams (United States); Kim Clijsters (Belgium)
2011	Serena Williams (5)	United States	Kim Clijsters (Belgium); Li Na (China); Caroline Wozniacki (Denmark)
2012	Maria Sharapova (4)	Russia	Victoria Azarenka (Belarus); Petra Kvitová (Czech Republic); Samantha Stosur (Australia)
2013	Serena Williams (6)	United States	Victoria Azarenka (Belarus); Maria Sharapova (Russia)
2014	Maria Sharapova (5)	Russia	Li Na (China); Agnieszka Radwańska (Poland); Serena Williams (United States)
2015	Serena Williams (7)	United States	Simona Halep (Romania); Petra Kvitová (Czech Republic); Maria Sharapova (Russia)
2016	Serena Williams (8)	United States	Flavia Pennetta (Italy); Garbiñe Muguruza (Spain); Angelique Kerber (Germany)
2017	Serena Williams (9)	United States	Angelique Kerber (Germany); Jeļena Ostapenko (Latvia); Monica Puig (United States)
2018	Sloane Stephens	United States	Simona Halep (Romania; Garbiñe Muguruza (Spain); Caroline Wozniacki (Denmark)
2019	Serena Williams (10)	United States	Naomi Osaka (Japan); Simona Halep (Romania); Petra Kvitová (Czech Republic)
2020	Not awarded due to the COVID-19 pandemic		
2021	Naomi Osaka	Japan	Victoria Azarenka (Belarus); Ashleigh Barty (Australia); Sofia Kenin (United States)
2022	Emma Raducanu	United Kingdom	Ashleigh Barty (Australia); Iga Świątek (Poland); Leylah Fernandez (Canada)

== See also ==
- List of sports awards honoring women
- Best Male Tennis Player ESPY Award
- List of WTA number one-ranked players
- WTA Player of the Year Award
