= Best Male Golfer ESPY Award =

Annual athletic award

The Best Male Golfer ESPY Award has been presented annually in two different periods to the professional male golfer adjudged to be the best in a given calendar year. It was originally presented between 1993 and 2004, but was, along with the parallel Best Female Golfer ESPY Award, subsumed in 2005 by the Best Golfer ESPY Award. The Best Male and Female Golfer Awards returned to the ESPY list in 2009.

Between 1993 and 2004, the award voting panel comprised variously fans; sportswriters and broadcasters, sports executives, and retired sportspersons, termed collectively experts; and ESPN personalities, but balloting thereafter has been exclusively by fans over the Internet from amongst choices selected by the ESPN Select Nominating Committee.

Through the 2001 iteration of the ESPY Awards, ceremonies were conducted in February of each year to honor achievements over the previous calendar year; awards presented thereafter are conferred in July and reflect performance from the June previous. Because of the rescheduling of the ESPY Awards ceremony, the award presented in 2002 was given in consideration of performance betwixt February 2001 and June 2002. The award wasn't awarded in 2020 due to the COVID-19 pandemic.

== List of winners ==
Year	Golfer	Nation of citizenship
1993	Fred Couples	United States
1994	Nick Price	Zimbabwe
1995	Nick Price (2)	Zimbabwe
1996	Corey Pavin	United States
1997	Tom Lehman	United States
1998	Tiger Woods	United States
1999	Mark O'Meara	United States
2000	Tiger Woods (2)	United States
2001	Tiger Woods (3)	United States
2002	Tiger Woods (4)	United States
2003	Tiger Woods (5)	United States
2004	Phil Mickelson	United States
2009	Tiger Woods (6)	United States
2010	Phil Mickelson (2)	United States
2011	Rory McIlroy	United Kingdom (Northern Ireland)
2012	Bubba Watson	United States
2013	Tiger Woods (7)	United States
2014	Bubba Watson (2)	United States
2015	Jordan Spieth	United States
2016	Jordan Spieth (2)	United States
2017	Sergio García	Spain
2018	Jordan Spieth (3)	United States
2019	Brooks Koepka	United States
2020	Not awarded due to the COVID-19 pandemic	
2021	Phil Mickelson (3)	United States
2022	Justin Thomas	United States

== See also ==
- List of golf awards
- Best Female Golfer ESPY Award
- PGA Player of the Year Award
- PGA Tour Player of the Year Award
- Byron Nelson Award
- Vardon Trophy
