= Wittels =

Wittels is a surname.

Notable persons with the name Wittels include:

- Fritz Wittels (1880–1950), Austrian-born American psychoanalyst
- Garrett Wittels (born 1990), American professional baseball player
- Harris Wittels (1984–2015), American actor, comedian, writer, and musician
- Stephanie Wittels (born 1981), American voice actress
