= Best Female Golfer ESPY Award =

Annual athletic award

The Best Female Golfer ESPY Award has been presented annually in two different periods to the professional female golfer adjudged to be the best in a given calendar year. It was originally presented between 1993 and 2004, but was, along with the parallel Best Male Golfer ESPY Award, subsumed in 2005 by the Best Golfer ESPY Award. In 2009, the awards were again bifurcated by sex.

Between 1993 and 2004, the award voting panel was comprised variously fans; sportswriters and broadcasters, sports executives, and retired sportspersons, termed collectively experts; and ESPN personalities, but balloting thereafter has been exclusively by fans over the Internet from amongst choices selected by the ESPN Select Nominating Committee.

Through the 2001 iteration of the ESPY Awards, ceremonies were conducted in February of each year to honor achievements from the previous calendar year; awards presented thereafter are conferred in June or July and they reflect performance from the previous. The award wasn't awarded in 2020 due to the COVID-19 pandemic that year.

== List of winners ==
Year	Golfer	Nation of citizenship
1993	Dottie Mochrie	United States
1994	Betsy King	United States
1995	Laura Davies	United Kingdom (England)
1996	Annika Sörenstam	Sweden
1997	Karrie Webb	Australia
1998	Annika Sörenstam (2)	Sweden
1999	Annika Sörenstam (3)	Sweden
2000	Juli Inkster	United States
2001	Karrie Webb (2)	Australia
2002	Annika Sörenstam (4)	Sweden
2003	Annika Sörenstam (5)	Sweden
2004	Annika Sörenstam (6)	Sweden
2009	Lorena Ochoa	Mexico
2010	Lorena Ochoa (2)	Mexico
2011	Cristie Kerr	United States
2012	Cristie Kerr (2)	United States
2013	Stacy Lewis	United States
2014	Michelle Wie	United States
2015	Lydia Ko	New Zealand
2016	Lydia Ko (2)	New Zealand
2017	Ariya Jutanugarn	Thailand
2018	Park Sung-hyun	South Korea
2019	Brooke Henderson	Canada
2020	Not awarded due to the COVID-19 pandemic	
2021	Kim Sei-young	South Korea
2022	Nelly Korda	United States

== See also ==
- Best Male Golfer ESPY Award
- List of golf awards
- List of sports awards honoring women
- List of LPGA Tour leading money winners by year
- Rolex Player of the Year Award
- Vare Trophy
