= List of sports awards honoring women =

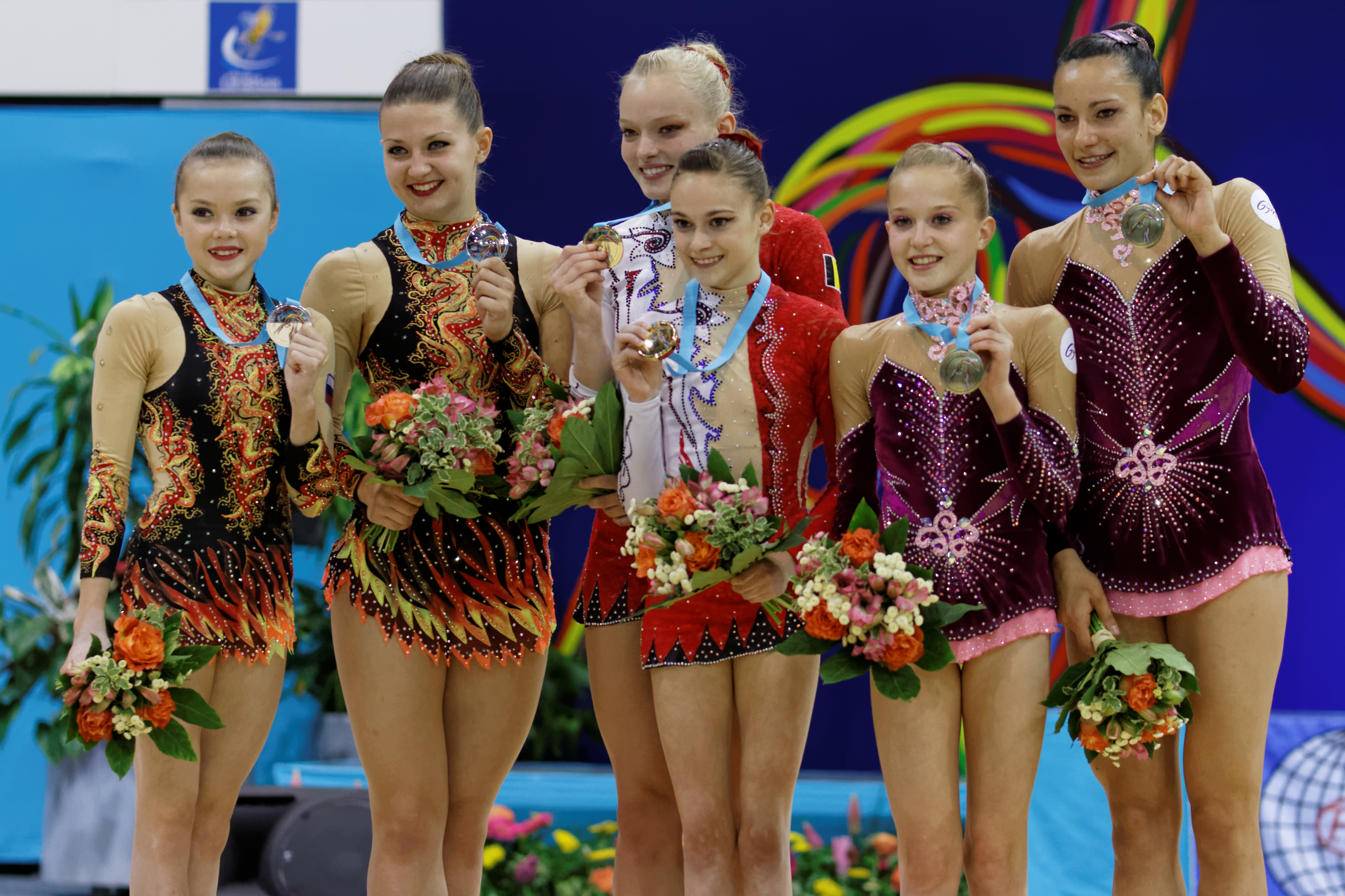
2014 Acrobatic Gymnastics World Championships Women's pair winners

This list of notable awards honoring sportswomen gives the country of the sponsoring organization, but some awards are open to sportswomen around the world. The list includes sub-lists for general awards to female athletes, for awards to association football (soccer) players, to basketball players and to women players in other sports.

All of these sublists include awards for coaches and administrators in women's sports. Awards for these roles are usually not restricted by the recipient's sex or gender.

== General awards ==
Country	Type	Award	Sponsor
United States	General	Best Female Athlete ESPY Award	ESPY Award
United States	Disability	Best Female Athlete with a Disability ESPY Award	ESPY Award
United States	College	Best Female College Athlete ESPY Award	ESPY Award
United States	General	Billie Jean King Contribution Award	Women's Sports Foundation
United States	Olympics	Best U.S. Female Olympian ESPY Award	ESPY Award
UK / Ireland	General	BT Sport Action Woman Awards	BT Sport
United States	General	Flo Hyman Award	Women's Sports Foundation'
United States	High School	Gatorade Female High School Athlete of the Year	Gatorade Player of the Year awards
United States	College	Honda Sports Award	Honda, National Collegiate Athletic Association
United States	College	Honda-Broderick Cup	Honda, National Collegiate Athletic Association
Monaco	General	Laureus World Sports Award for Sportswoman of the Year	Laureus World Sports Awards
United States	College	NCAA Woman of the Year Award	National Collegiate Athletic Association
United Kingdom	General	Scottish Women in Sport Hall of Fame	Scottish Women in Sport Hall of Fame
United States	General	Sports Illustrated Top 20 Female Athletes of the Decade (2009)	Sports Illustrated
United States	General	Sportswoman of the Year Award	Women's Sports Foundation
United Kingdom	General	Sunday Times and Sky Sports Sportswomen of the Year Awards	The Sunday Times
United States	Olympics	USOC SportsWoman of the Year	United States Olympic & Paralympic Committee
United States	General	University of Texas Women's Athletics Hall of Honor	Texas Longhorns
United Kingdom	General	William Hill Sportswoman of the Year	William Hill (bookmaker)
United States	General	Women's Sports Foundation awards	Women's Sports Foundation
India	General	BBC Indian Sportswoman of the Year	BBC Hindi
Philippines	General	PSC–PCW Women in Sports Awards	Philippine Sports Commission, Philippine Commission on Women, and corporate sponsors

== Association football ==
Country	Award	Sponsor
Australia	A-League Women Golden Boot	A-League Women
Egypt	African Women's Footballer of the Year	Confederation of African Football
United States	Annual Women's Professional Soccer awards (Note: Discontinued along with the league after the 2011 season.)	Women's Professional Soccer
International (Note: Although presented by a British body, this award is open to players of all nationalities, regardless of their club affiliations. Through the 2020 awards, only two British players have been finalists—one Scottish (one time) and one English (twice). On all three occasions, the British player was the recipient.)	BBC Women's Footballer of the Year	BBC
International (Note: Although presented by a French magazine, this award is open to players of all nationalities, regardless of their club affiliations. No French players were among the finalists in the first two years of the award (2018, 2019).)	Ballon d'Or Féminin	France Football
United States	Best Female Soccer Player ESPY Award (Note: Discontinued after the 2004 award.)	ESPY Award
Americas	CONCACAF Awards	CONCACAF
Czech Republic	Czech Footballer of the Year (women)	Football Association of the Czech Republic
Denmark	Danish Football Player of the Year	Danish Football Union
Sweden	Diamantbollen	Swedish Football Association, Sydsvenskan newspaper
Estonia	Estonian Female Footballer of the Year	Estonian Football Association
Estonia	Estonian Female Young Footballer of the Year	Estonian Football Association
International	FIFA Female Player of the Century	FIFA
International	FIFA Women's World Cup awards	FIFA
International	FIFA Women's World Player of the Year (Note: Discontinued after the 2015 award and replaced by The Best FIFA Women's Player.)	FIFA
Germany	Footballer of the Year (Germany)	Association of German Sports Journalists, Kicker magazine.
United States	Gatorade Player of the Year awards#Soccer	Gatorade
United States	Hermann Trophy	Missouri Athletic Club
United States	ISAA Player of the Year	Intercollegiate Soccer Association of America
Iceland	Icelandic Footballer of the Year	Selected by a panel of officials, coaches and former players
Iran	Iran football award winners	Persian Gulf Pro League
United States	Jerry Yeagley Award	United Soccer Coaches
Australia	Julie Dolan Medal	W-League
Latvia	Latvian Footballer of the Year	Latvian Football Federation
United States	Mike Berticelli Award	United Soccer Coaches
United States	NWSL Goal of the Week	National Women's Soccer League
United States	NWSL Most Valuable Player Award	National Women's Soccer League
United States	NWSL Player of the Month	National Women's Soccer League
United States	NWSL Player of the Week	National Women's Soccer League
United States	NWSL Rookie of the Month	National Women's Soccer League
United States	NWSL Save of the Week	National Women's Soccer League
United States	NWSL Shield	National Women's Soccer League
United States	NWSL Team of the Month	National Women's Soccer League
United States	NWSL awards	National Women's Soccer League
England and Wales	PFA Women's Players' Player of the Year	Professional Footballers' Association
England and Wales	PFA Women's Young Player of the Year	Professional Footballers' Association
Scotland	PFA Scotland Women's Player of the Year	PFA Scotland
Scotland	SFWA Women's International Player of the Year	Scottish Football Writers' Association
Scotland	Scottish Women's Football Annual Awards	Scottish Women's Football
Scotland	Scottish Women's Premier League Coach of the Year Award (Note: In all sports, "women's coach" is defined as an individual of any sex or gender who coaches a women's team.)	Scottish Women's Football
United States	Soccer America Player of the Year Award	Soccer America magazine
United Kingdom	The 100 Best Female Footballers In The World	The Guardian newspaper
International	The Best FIFA Women's Coach	FIFA
International	The Best FIFA Women's Player	FIFA
England	The FA England Awards	The Football Association
England	The FA Women's Football Awards	The Football Association
United States	TopDrawerSoccer.com National Player of the Year Award	TopDrawerSoccer.com
France	Trophées UNFP du football	National Union of Professional Footballers
United States	U.S. Soccer Athlete of the Year	United States Soccer Federation
Europe	UEFA Women's Player of the Year Award	UEFA
United States	USWNT All-Time Best XI	United States Soccer Federation
Ukraine	Ukrainian Woman Footballer of the Year	Ukrainian Women's League
United States	WPS Player of the Month	Women's Professional Soccer
Wales	Welsh Footballer of the Year	Football Association of Wales
South Africa	SAFA Women's League awards	Hollywoodbets

== Basketball ==
Country	Award	Sponsor(s)
United States	All-WNBA Team	Women's National Basketball Association
United States	Ann Meyers Drysdale Award	Naismith Memorial Basketball Hall of Fame & Women's Basketball Coaches Association
United States	Best Female College Basketball Player ESPY Award	ESPY Award
United States	Best WNBA Player ESPY Award	Women's National Basketball Association
United States	Cheryl Miller Award	Naismith Memorial Basketball Hall of Fame & Women's Basketball Coaches Association
United States	Dawn Staley Award	Phoenix Club of Philadelphia
United States	Dawn Staley Community Leadership Award	Women's National Basketball Association
United States	Geno Auriemma Award (Note: This is one of several annual awards presented to the top head coach in NCAA Division I women's basketball. Of the 22 individual award winners through the 2023–24 NCAA Division I season, six are men—including Geno Auriemma, who has won six times to date and became the award's namesake in 2024.)	United States Basketball Writers Association
United States	Honda Sports Award (basketball)	Honda, Women's Basketball Coaches Association
United States	John R. Wooden Award (Note: This award is presented annually to the top player in US college basketball, with separate awards for men and women.)	Los Angeles Athletic Club
United States	Katrina McClain Award	Naismith Memorial Basketball Hall of Fame & Women's Basketball Coaches Association
United States	Lisa Leslie Award	Naismith Memorial Basketball Hall of Fame & Women's Basketball Coaches Association
United States	Naismith Trophy	Atlanta Tipoff Club
United States	Nancy Lieberman Award	Naismith Memorial Basketball Hall of Fame & Women's Basketball Coaches Association
United States	Pat Summitt Most Courageous Award (Note: This award can be won by any individual involved with women's college basketball, regardless of sex or gender, or by a women's college basketball team. The corresponding award for men's college basketball is similarly open to all involved with the men's game. Notably, in 2019, a woman received the men's award and a man received the women's award.)	United States Basketball Writers Association
United States	Tamika Catchings Award	United States Basketball Writers Association
United States	USBWA Women's National Player of the Year	United States Basketball Writers Association
United States	Kim Perrot Sportsmanship Award	Women's National Basketball Association
United States	Wade Trophy	Women's Basketball Coaches Association
United States	WBCA Defensive Player of the Year	Women's Basketball Coaches Association
United States	WBCA Player of the Year	Women's Basketball Coaches Association
United States	Maggie Dixon Award (Note: This award is presented to the top first-year head coach in NCAA Division I women's basketball, regardless of the coach's sex or gender. Of the 18 award winners through the 2023–24 season, four have been men.)	Women's Basketball Coaches Association
United States	WNBA All-Star Game Most Valuable Player Award	Women's National Basketball Association
United States	WNBA Basketball Executive of the Year Award (Note: This award can be won by any individual regardless of sex or gender. Of the seven awards presented through the 2023 season, six have gone to men.)	Women's National Basketball Association
United States	WNBA Coach of the Year Award (Note: This award can be won by any individual regardless of sex or gender. Through the 2023 WNBA season, 14 of the 27 awards presented have been earned by men.)	Women's National Basketball Association
United States	WNBA Defensive Player of the Year Award	Women's National Basketball Association
United States	WNBA Finals Most Valuable Player Award	Women's National Basketball Association
United States	WNBA Most Improved Player Award	Women's National Basketball Association
United States	WNBA Most Valuable Player Award	Women's National Basketball Association
United States	WNBA Peak Performers	Women's National Basketball Association
United States	WNBA Rookie of the Year Award	Women's National Basketball Association
United States	WNBA Sixth Player of the Year Award	Women's National Basketball Association
United States	Women's Basketball Hall of Fame (Note: This hall of fame honors contributors to women's basketball in all roles. Many men have been honored for their contributions as coaches and administrators in the women's game.)	Women's Basketball Hall of Fame

== Other sports ==
Country	Sport	Award	Sponsor
United States	Baseball	All-American Girls Professional Baseball League Player of the Year Award	All-American Girls Professional Baseball League
United States	Collegiate wrestling	Anthony-Maroulis Trophy	USA Wrestling
Finland	Ice hockey	Aurora Borealis Cup	Naisten Liiga
United States	Extreme sport	Best Female Action Sports Athlete ESPY Award	ESPY Award
United States	Golf	Best Female Golfer ESPY Award	ESPY Award
United States	Tennis	Best Female Tennis Player ESPY Award	ESPY Award
United States	Track and field	Best Female Track Athlete ESPY Award	ESPY Award
United States & Canada	Ice hockey	Billie Jean King Most Valuable Player	Professional Women's Hockey League
United States	Softball	Blue Darter Trophy	Lee's Summit Girls Softball Association
United States	Ice hockey	Bob Allen Women's Player of the Year Award	USA Hockey
Canada	Ice hockey	Clarkson Cup	Canadian Women's Hockey Championship
United States	Golf	Dinah Shore Trophy Award	National Golf Coaches Association
United States	Golf	Edith Cummings Munson Golf Award	National Golf Coaches Association
United States	Golf	Heather Farr Player Award	LPGA
United States & Canada	Ice hockey	Ilana Kloss Playoff Most Valuable Player	Professional Women's Hockey League
United States	Tennis	International Tennis Hall of Fame	Newport Casino
Canada	Ringette	Jeanne Sauvé Memorial Cup	National Ringette League
Australia	Rugby league	Karyn Murphy Medal	NRL Women's Premiership
United States	Ice hockey	Laura Hurd Award	NCAA Division III
United States	Golf	LPGA Tour awards	LPGA
United States	Softball	List of Senior CLASS Award softball winners	Premier Sports Management (Note: The Senior CLASS Awards are presented to NCAA Division I athletes, but are not officially sponsored by the NCAA.)
United States	Volleyball	List of Senior CLASS Award women's volleyball winners	Premier Sports Management
United States	Ice hockey	Patty Kazmaier Award	NCAA Divisions I and II (Note: The NCAA's top-level championship in women's ice hockey is open to members of Divisions I and II. Members of both divisions compete under identical scholarship limits.)
United States	Pickleball	Pickleball Hall of Fame	Independent not-for-profit organization.
United Kingdom	Long-distance swimming	Queen of the Channel	Channel Swimming Association
United States	Field hockey	USA Field Hockey Hall of Fame	Ursinus College
United States & Canada	Ice hockey	Walter Cup	Professional Women's Hockey League
United Kingdom	Rugby league	Woman of Steel	RFL Women's Super League
United States	Softball	Women's College World Series Most Outstanding Player (Note: This award is specific to NCAA Division I; the NCAA uses the term "Women's College World Series" strictly for its Division I softball championship. Identical awards are presented in the Division II and III championships.)	NCAA

== See also ==
- List of awards honoring women
- Lists of awards
