= Arod =

Arod or A-Rod may refer to:

== Nickname ==
- A-Rod (Alex Rodriguez, born 1975), American Major League Baseball player
- A-Rod (Aaron Rodgers, born 1983), American National Football League quarterback
- A-Rod (Andy Roddick, born 1982), American tennis player
- A-Rod (Amy Rodriguez, born 1987), American soccer player

== Other uses ==
- Arod (biblical figure) or Arodi, a son of Gad in the Bible
