= Best Male Tennis Player ESPY Award =

Annual athletic award

The Best Male Tennis Player ESPY Award has been presented annually since 1993 to the professional male tennis player adjudged to be the best in a given calendar year.

Between 1993 and 2004, the award voting panel comprised variously fans; sportswriters and broadcasters, sports executives, and retired sportspersons, termed collectively experts; and ESPN personalities, but balloting thereafter has been exclusively by fans over the Internet from amongst choices selected by the ESPN Select Nominating Committee.

Through the 2001 iteration of the ESPY Awards, ceremonies were conducted in February of each year to honor achievements over the previous calendar year; awards presented thereafter are conferred in June and reflect performance from the June previous. The award wasn't awarded in 2020 due to the COVID-19 pandemic.

Starting in 2023, the Best Male Tennis Player ESPY Award and Best Female Tennis Player ESPY Award were combined into one Best Tennis Player ESPY Award. The ESPY Award that year was presented to Novak Djokovic over finalists Carlos Alcaraz, Aryna Sabalenka, and Iga Świątek.

== List of winners ==
Year	Player	Nation represented	Other announced finalists
1993	Jim Courier	United States	
1994	Pete Sampras	United States	
1995	Pete Sampras (2)	United States	
1996	Pete Sampras (3)	United States	
1997	Pete Sampras (4)	United States	
1998	Pete Sampras (5)	United States	
1999	Pete Sampras (6)	United States	Andre Agassi (United States); Yevgeny Kafelnikov (Russia)
2000	Andre Agassi	United States	Yevgeny Kafelnikov (Russia); Pete Sampras (United States)
2001	Pete Sampras (7)	United States	Yevgeny Kafelnikov (Russia); Gustavo Kuerten (Brazil); Marat Safin (Russia)
2002	Lleyton Hewitt	Australia	Andre Agassi (United States); Gustavo Kuerten (Brazil)
2003	Andre Agassi (2)	United States	Juan Carlos Ferrero (Spain); Lleyton Hewitt (Australia); Pete Sampras (United States
2004	Andy Roddick	United States	Andre Agassi (United States); Roger Federer (Switzerland); Juan Carlos Ferrero (Spain)
2005	Roger Federer	Switzerland	Rafael Nadal (Spain); Andy Roddick (United States); Marat Safin (Russia)
2006	Roger Federer (2)	Switzerland	James Blake (United States); Rafael Nadal (Spain); David Nalbandian (Argentina)
2007	Roger Federer (3)	Switzerland	James Blake (United States); Rafael Nadal (Spain); Andy Roddick United States)
2008	Roger Federer (4)	Switzerland	Novak Djokovic (Serbia); Rafael Nadal (Spain)
2009	Roger Federer (5)	Switzerland	Rafael Nadal (Spain)
2010	Roger Federer (6)	Switzerland	Juan Martín del Potro (Argentina); Rafael Nadal (Spain)
2011	Rafael Nadal	Spain	Roger Federer (Switzerland); Novak Djokovic (Serbia)
2012	Novak Djokovic	Serbia	Roger Federer (Switzerland); Rafael Nadal (Spain)
2013	Novak Djokovic (2)	Serbia	Roger Federer (Switzerland); Rafael Nadal (Spain); Andy Murray (United Kingdom)
2014	Rafael Nadal (2)	Spain	Novak Djokovic (Serbia); Andy Murray (United Kingdom)
2015	Novak Djokovic (3)	Serbia	Marin Čilić (Croatia); Roger Federer (Switzerland); Stan Wawrinka (Switzerland)
2016	Novak Djokovic (4)	Serbia	Andy Murray (United Kingdom); Roger Federer (Switzerland)
2017	Roger Federer (7)	Switzerland	Andy Murray (United Kingdom); Rafael Nadal (Spain); Stan Wawrinka (Switzerland)
2018	Roger Federer (8)	Switzerland	Rafael Nadal (Spain); Marin Čilić (Croatia)
2019	Roger Federer (9)	Switzerland	Rafael Nadal (Spain); Novak Djokovic (Serbia); Stefanos Tsitsipas (Greece)
2020	Not awarded due to the COVID-19 pandemic		
2021	Novak Djokovic (5)	Serbia	Daniil Medvedev (Russia); Rafael Nadal (Spain); Dominic Thiem (Austria)
2022	Rafael Nadal (3)	Spain	Carlos Alcaraz (Spain); Dylan Alcott (Australia); Félix Auger-Aliassime (Canada)
2023	Novak Djokovic (6)	Serbia	Carlos Alcaraz (Spain); Iga Świątek (Poland); Aryna Sabalenka (Belarus)

=== Multiple winners ===
Roger Federer is the only male player to win the award eight and nine times. Pete Sampras, Federer, and Novak Djokovic are the only players to have won the award in consecutive seasons. Federer and Sampras have won the award six consecutive times, a record.

Players that are still active in Europe are highlighted in boldface.

Multiple Tennis Player of the Year
Player	Wins	Seasons
Roger Federer	9	2005–10, 2017–19
Pete Sampras	7	1994–99, 2001
**Novak Djokovic**	6	2012–13, 2015–16, 2021, 2023
**Rafael Nadal**	3	2011, 2013, 2022
Andre Agassi	2	2000, 2003

== See also ==
- Best Female Tennis Player ESPY Award
- ATP Player of the Year Award
- ITF World Champions
- World number one male tennis player rankings
