= Best Female College Athlete ESPY Award =

Annual athletic award

ESPY Award for Best College Athlete, Women's Sports
- Awarded for: best female college athlete
- Presented by: ESPN
- First award: 2002
- Currently held by: Lauren Betts
- Website: espn.com/espys/

The ESPY Award for Best College Athlete, Women's Sports, known before 2021 as the Best Female College Athlete ESPY Award, is an annual award honoring the achievements of a female individual from the world of collegiate sports. It was first presented as part of the ESPY Awards in 2002, following the subsumption of the Best Female College Basketball Player ESPY Award, which was presented annually between the 1993 and 2001 ceremonies, inclusive. The award trophy, designed by sculptor Lawrence Nowlan, is awarded to the sportswoman adjudged to be the best in a given calendar year of those contesting collegiate sport in the United States through the National Collegiate Athletic Association (NCAA). Since the 2004 awards, the winner has been chosen by online voting through three to five nominees selected by the ESPN Select Nominating Committee. Before that, determination of the winners was made by an panel of experts. Through the 2001 iteration of the ESPY Awards, ceremonies were conducted in February of each year to honor achievements over the previous calendar year; awards presented thereafter are conferred in July and reflect performance from the June previous. (Note: Because of the rescheduling of the ESPY Awards ceremony, the award presented in 2002 was given in consideration of performance between February 2001 and June 2002.)

The inaugural winner of the Best Female College Athlete ESPY Award at the 2002 awards was University of Connecticut (UConn) Huskies basketball player Sue Bird. During her collegiate career, Bird won two NCAA championships, and was awarded a further eight accolades for her achievements. She became the first of two basketball players to be nominated for, and hence to win, the Best Female College Athlete ESPY Award. The 2003 winner of the award was another UConn player, Diana Taurasi. Taurasi won the accolade again the following year, and is one of three women, all UConn basketball players, to have received the Best Female College Athlete ESPY Award more than once: the most any one woman has won is Maya Moore, who earned three consecutive awards between the 2009 and 2011 ceremonies. Basketball players dominate the winners list, with 14 awards, while softball competitors have won five times, and just one swimmer (the University of California, Berkeley Golden Bears' Missy Franklin at the 2015 ESPY Awards) has been recognized in the accolade's history. The most recent winner of the award is UCLA basketball player Lauren Betts.

The accolade was combined with the Best Male College Athlete ESPY Award to create the Best College Athlete ESPY Award which was presented for the first time at the 2018 ESPY Awards. Beginning in 2021, the awards were again separated into men's and women's versions using the current naming scheme.

== Winners and nominees ==
ESPY Award for Best College Athlete, Women's Sports winners and nominees
Year	Image	Winner	University	Sport	Other nominees	Ref(s)
2002	Sue Bird playing in a basketball game in 2012	Sue Bird	Connecticut Huskies (Note: The University of Connecticut did not adopt "UConn" as its sole athletic brand name until the 2013–14 school year.)	Basketball	Natalie Coughlin – California Golden Bears (Swimming); Jennie Finch – Arizona Wildcats (Softball); Stacey Nuveman – UCLA Bruins (Softball); Jackie Stiles – Missouri State Lady Bears (Basketball)	
2003	Diana Taurasi competing in a basketball match in 2014	Diana Taurasi	Connecticut Huskies	Basketball	Alana Beard – Duke Blue Devils (Basketball); Natalie Coughlin – California Golden Bears (Swimming); Cat Osterman – Texas Longhorns (Softball)	
2004	Diana Taurasi at the White House in 2008	Diana Taurasi (2)	Connecticut Huskies	Basketball	Alana Beard – Duke Blue Devils (Basketball); Tara Kirk – Stanford Cardinal (Swimming); Cat Reddick – North Carolina Tar Heels (Soccer); Jessica van der Linden – Florida State Seminoles (Softball)	
2005	Cat Osterman competing in a softball tournament in 2006	Cat Osterman	Texas Longhorns	Softball	Seimone Augustus – LSU Lady Tigers (Basketball); Nicole Corriero – Harvard Crimson (Ice hockey); Kristen Maloney – UCLA Bruins (Gymnastics); Katie Thorlakson – Notre Dame (Soccer)	
2006	Cat Osterman competing in a softball tournament in 2006	Cat Osterman (2)	Texas Longhorns	Softball	Seimone Augustus – LSU Lady Tigers (Basketball); Virginia Powell – USC Trojans (Track and field); Christine Sinclair – Portland Pilots (Soccer); Courtney Thompson – Washington Huskies (Volleyball)	
2007	Taryne Mowatt attending a Red Carpet event in 2008	Taryne Mowatt	Arizona Wildcats	Softball	Monica Abbott – Tennessee Lady Volunteers (Softball); Kerri Hanks – Notre Dame Fighting Irish (Soccer); Kara Lynn Joyce – Georgia Bulldogs (Swimming)	
2008	Candace Parker playing for the Los Angeles Sparks in 2017	Candace Parker	Tennessee Lady Volunteers	Basketball	Rachel Dawson – North Carolina Tar Heels (Field hockey); Angela Tincher – Virginia Tech Hokies (Softball)	
2009	Maya Moore attending a celebratory dinner in 2009	Maya Moore	Connecticut Huskies	Basketball	Kerri Hanks – Notre Dame Fighting Irish (Soccer); Courtney Kupets – Georgia Gymdogs (Gymnastics); Danielle Lawrie – Washington Huskies (Softball); Dana Vollmer – California Golden Bears (Swimming)	
2010	Maya Moore playing for the United States National Women's Basketball team in 2010	Maya Moore (2)	Connecticut Huskies	Basketball	Tina Charles – Connecticut Huskies (Basketball); Megan Hodge – Penn State Nittany Lions (Volleyball); Megan Langenfeld – UCLA Bruins (Softball)	
2011	Maya Moore holding a gold-plated trophy in 2011	Maya Moore (3)	Connecticut Huskies	Basketball	Blair Brown – Penn State Nittany Lions (Volleyball); Dallas Escobedo – Arizona State Sun Devils (Softball); Melissa Henderson – Notre Dame Fighting Irish (Soccer); Katinka Hosszú – USC Trojans (Swimming)	
2012	Brittney Griner holding a trophy amongst a group of people in 2012	Brittney Griner	Baylor Lady Bears	Basketball	Alexandra Jupiter – USC Trojans (Volleyball); Caitlin Leverenz – California Golden Bears (Swimming); Teresa Noyola – Stanford Cardinal (Soccer); Jackie Traina – Alabama Crimson Tide (Softball)	
2013	Brittney Griner competing in a 2017 basketball game	Brittney Griner (2)	Baylor Lady Bears	Basketball	Kara Cannizzaro – North Carolina Tar Heels (Lacrosse); Crystal Dunn – North Carolina Tar Heels (Soccer); Keilani Ricketts – Oklahoma Sooners (Softball)	
2014	Breanna Stewart holding a plague in her left hand in 2012	Breanna Stewart	UConn Huskies	Basketball	Morgan Brian – Virginia Cavaliers (Soccer); Taylor Cummings – Maryland Terrapins (Lacrosse); Micha Hancock – Penn State Nittany Lions (Volleyball); Hannah Rogers – Florida Gators (Softball)	
2015	Missy Franklin competing in an outdoor swimming tournament in 2014	Missy Franklin	California Golden Bears	Swimming	Taylor Cummings – Maryland Terrapins (Lacrosse); Lauren Haeger – Florida Gators (Softball); Micha Hancock – Penn State Nittany Lions (Volleyball); Breanna Stewart – Connecticut Huskies (Basketball)	
2016	Breanna Stewart holding a gold-plated trophy in both hands in 2016	Breanna Stewart (2)	UConn Huskies	Basketball	Samantha Bricio – USC Trojans (Volleyball); Taylor Cummings – Maryland Terrapins (Lacrosse); Raquel Rodríguez – Penn State Nittany Lions (Soccer); Sierra Romero – Michigan Wolverines (Softball)	
2017	–	Kelly Barnhill	Florida Gators	Softball	Inky Ajanaku – Stanford Cardinal (Volleyball); Kadeisha Buchanan – West Virginia Mountaineers (Soccer); Kelsey Plum – Washington Huskies (Basketball); Zoe Stukenberg – Maryland Terrapins (Lacrosse)	
2018–2020	-	Not Awarded	Not Awarded	Not Awarded	Not Awarded	
2021	Alt=Paige Bueckers handling a basketball while in motion	Paige Bueckers	UConn Huskies	Basketball	Odicci Alexander – James Madison Dukes (Softball); Jaelin Howell – Florida State Seminoles (Soccer); Madison Lilley – Kentucky Wildcats (Volleyball)	
2022	–	Jocelyn Alo	Oklahoma Sooners	Softball	Aliyah Boston – South Carolina (Basketball); Jaelin Howell – Florida State (Soccer); Charlotte North – Boston College (Lacrosse)	
2023	Alt=	Caitlin Clark	Iowa Hawkeyes	Basketball	Jordy Bahl – Oklahoma Sooners (Softball); Izzy Scane – Northwestern (Lacrosse); Trinity Thomas – Florida Gators (Gymnastics)	
2024	Alt=	Caitlin Clark (2)	Iowa Hawkeyes	Basketball	Sarah Franklin – Wisconsin Badgers (Volleyball); Izzy Scane – Northwestern (Lacrosse); Haleigh Bryant – LSU Tigers (Gymnastics)	
2025	–	JuJu Watkins	USC Trojans	Basketball	Gretchen Walsh – Virginia Cavaliers (Swimming); Kate Faasse – North Carolina Tar Heels (Soccer); Olivia Babcock – Pittsburgh Panthers (Volleyball)	
2026	Betts with UCLA in 2026	Lauren Betts	UCLA Bruins	Basketball	Madison Taylor – Northwestern Wildcats (Lacrosse); Faith Torrez – Oklahoma Sooners (Gymnastics); Olivia Babcock – Pittsburgh Panthers (Volleyball)	

== Statistics ==
Multiple winners and nominees
Name	Wins	Nominations
Maya Moore	3	3
Cat Osterman	2	3
Breanna Stewart	2	3
Diana Taurasi	2	2
Caitlin Clark	2	2
Taylor Cummings	0	3
Seimone Augustus	0	2
Alana Beard	0	2
Natalie Coughlin	0	2
Kerri Hanks	0	2
Izzy Scane	0	2
Olivia Babcock	0	2

Winners by college team represented
Team	Wins	Nominations
UConn Huskies	9	11
Texas Longhorns	2	3
Iowa Hawkeyes	2	2
Baylor Lady Bears	2	0
California Golden Bears	1	5
USC Trojans	1	5
Florida Gators	1	4
Arizona Wildcats	1	2
Oklahoma Sooners	1	4
UCLA Bruins	1	4
North Carolina Tar Heels	0	5
Penn State Nittany Lions	0	5
Maryland Terrapins	0	4
LSU Lady Tigers	0	3
Notre Dame Fighting Irish	0	3
Stanford Cardinal	0	3
Washington Huskies	0	3
Duke Blue Devils	0	2
Florida State Seminoles	0	2
Northwestern Wildcats	0	3
Virginia Cavaliers	0	2
Pittsburgh Panthers	0	2

Winners and nominees by sport
Sport	Winners	Nominations
Basketball	16	25
Softball	5	21
Swimming	1	9
Soccer	0	14
Volleyball	0	12
Lacrosse	0	9
Gymnastics	0	5

== See also ==
- List of sports awards honoring women
- Best Male College Athlete ESPY Award
- Sporting News College Athlete of the Year
- National Collegiate Athletic Association awards
- ACC Athlete of the Year Award
- All-America
- NCAA Woman of the Year Award
