= Erin Regan =

American firefighter (born 1980)

Personal information
- Date of birth: June 1, 1980 (age 46)
- Place of birth: Rancho Santa Margarita, California, United States
- Height: 1.78 m (5 ft 10 in)
- Position: Goalkeeper

College career
Years	Team	Apps	(Gls)
1998–2002	Wake Forest Demon Deacons		

Senior career*
Years	Team	Apps	(Gls)
2003	Washington Freedom	1	(0)
- * Club domestic league appearances and goals

Erin Regan is an American firefighter and former soccer player who played as a goalkeeper for Washington Freedom.

== Soccer career ==
While studying at Wake Forest University, Regan played for the school's soccer team. During the WUSA's 2003 season, Regan was drafted to play for the Washington Freedom.

== Firefighting ==
Regan became a firefighter in 2008. In June 2016, she was one of 38 female firefighters among 4,000 who worked for the Los Angeles County Fire Department. She has campaigned for increased participating of women in firefighting, helping develop the "Girls Fire Camp" program for teenage girls.

For her service in the Palisades Fire, Regan was awarded the Pat Tillman Award for Service at the 2025 ESPY Awards.

== Personal life ==
Regan has a wife and son.

== Honors ==
- WUSA Founders Cup: 2003
- ESPY Pat Tillman Award for Service: 2025
