= Best College Football Player ESPY Award =

Annual athletic award (1993–2001)

- Country: United States

History
- First award: 1993
- Final award: 2001

The Best College Football Player ESPY Award was presented annually between 1993 and 2001 to the collegiate American football player adjudged to be the best in the United States in a given calendar year. The award was subsumed in 2002 by the Best Male College Athlete ESPY Award.

The award voting panel comprised variously fans; sportswriters and broadcasters, sports executives, and retired sportspersons, termed collectively experts; and ESPN personalities from amongst choices selected by the ESPN Select Nominating Committee. Inasmuch as the ESPY Awards ceremonies were conducted in February during the pendency of the award's existence, an award presented in a given year is for performance and achievements in the one year theretofore.

== List of winners ==
Year	Player	Position	Team
1993	Garrison Hearst	Running back	Georgia
1994	Charlie Ward	Quarterback	Florida State
1995	Rashaan Salaam	Running back	Colorado
1996	Eddie George	Running back	Ohio State
1997	Danny Wuerffel	Quarterback	Florida
1998	Peyton Manning	Quarterback	Tennessee
1999	Ricky Williams	Running back	Texas
2000	Michael Vick	Quarterback	Virginia Tech
2001	Chris Weinke	Quarterback	Florida State

== See also ==
- List of college football player of the year awards
- Heisman Trophy
- Maxwell Award
- Walter Camp Award
- AP College Football Player of the Year
