= Best Golfer ESPY Award =

Annual athletic award

- Awarded for: best golfer
- Presented by: ESPN
- First award: 2005
- Currently held by: Scottie Scheffler (USA)
- Website: www.espn.co.uk/espys/

The Best Golfer ESPY Award was presented annually between 2005 and 2008 to the professional golfer adjudged, irrespective of gender or nationality, to be the best in a given calendar year. The award subsumed the gender-specific Best Male and Best Female Golfer ESPY Awards, which were presented annually between 1993 and 2004, inclusive. Beginning in 2009, the awards were again bifurcated by sex. The award was reinstated in 2023.

Balloting for the award was undertaken by fans over the Internet from amongst between three and five choices selected by the ESPN Select Nominating Committee, and the award was conferred in June to reflect performance and achievement over the twelve previous months.

== List of winners ==
Year	Golfer	Nation of citizenship	Tour principally played
2005	Tiger Woods	United States	PGA Tour
2006	Tiger Woods (2)	United States	PGA Tour
2007	Tiger Woods (3)	United States	PGA Tour
2008	Tiger Woods (4)	United States	PGA Tour
2023	Scottie Scheffler	United States	PGA Tour
2024	Scottie Scheffler (2)	United States	PGA Tour
2025	Scottie Scheffler (3)	United States	PGA Tour
2026	Scottie Scheffler (4)	United States	PGA Tour

== See also ==
- List of golf awards

=== Other men's awards ===
- Best Male Golfer ESPY Award
- Byron Nelson Award
- PGA Player of the Year Award Teri Petrin
- PGA Tour Player of the Year Award
- Vardon Trophy

=== Other women's awards ===
- Best Female Golfer ESPY Award
- Rolex Player of the Year Award
- Vare Trophy
