= List of college football player of the year awards =

This article lists college football player of the year awards, which are presented annually by different publications and organizations to honor the top college football player of that year's NCAA season.

== List of awards and trophies ==
Active
Award	Organization	Since	Most recent winner(s)
Heisman Trophy	Heisman Trophy Trust (Note: Presented by the Downtown Athletic Club from 1935 to 2002)	1936	Fernando Mendoza
Maxwell Award	Maxwell Football Club	1937	Fernando Mendoza
The Sporting News College Football Player of the Year	The Sporting News	1942	Diego Pavia
Walter Camp Award	Walter Camp Football Foundation	1967	Fernando Mendoza
AP College Football Player of the Year	Associated Press	1998	Fernando Mendoza

Defunct
Award	Organization	Awarded
UPI College Football Player of the Year	United Press International	1950–1991
Chic Harley Award	Touchdown Club of Columbus	1955–2018
Best College Football Player ESPY Award	ESPY Awards	1993–2001
Archie Griffin Award	Touchdown Club of Columbus	1999–2018
