= Best Male College Basketball Player ESPY Award =

Annual athletic award (1993–2001)

- Awarded for: ESPY Award for the best male NCAA basketball player in the previous season
- Country: United States
- Presented by: ESPN

History
- First award: 1993
- Final award: 2001

The Best Male College Basketball Player ESPY Award was presented annually between 1993 and 2001 to the male collegiate basketball player determined to be the best in the NCAA in the previous season. The award was discontinued in 2002 when it was absorbed into the overall Best Male College Athlete ESPY Award.

The award voting panel comprised fans, sportswriters, broadcasters, sports executives, and retired sportspersons, termed collectively "experts", as well as ESPN personalities from amongst choices selected by the ESPN Select Nominating Committee.

Year	Player	Team	Position	Class	Reference
1993	Christian Laettner	Duke	C	Senior	
1994	Bobby Hurley	Duke	PG	Senior	
1995	Grant Hill	Duke	SF	Senior	
1996	Ed O'Bannon	UCLA	SF	Senior	
1997	Tim Duncan	Wake Forest	C	Junior	
1998	Keith Van Horn	Utah	PF	Senior	
1999	Antawn Jamison	North Carolina	PF	Junior	
2000	Elton Brand	Duke	C	Sophomore	
2001	Kenyon Martin	Cincinnati	C	Senior	

== See also ==
- Best Female College Basketball Player ESPY Award
