= Best Male College Athlete ESPY Award =

Annual athletic award

ESPY Award for Best College Athlete, Men's Sports
- Awarded for: best male college athlete
- Location: The Rooftop at Pier 17, New York City (2021)
- Presented by: ESPN
- First award: 2002
- Currently held by: Fernando Mendoza (Football)
- Website: espn.com/espys/

The ESPY Award for Best College Athlete, Men's Sports, known before 2021 as the Best Male College Athlete ESPY Award, is an annual award honoring the achievements of a male individual from the world of collegiate sports. It was first presented as part of the ESPY Awards in 2002, following the subsumption of the Best College Football Player and Best Male College Basketball Player ESPY Awards, each of which had been presented annually between 1993 and 2001, inclusive. The award trophy, designed by sculptor Lawrence Nowlan, is awarded to the sportsman adjudged to be the best in a given calendar year of those contesting collegiate sport in the United States through the National Collegiate Athletic Association (NCAA).

From 2004 until its subsumption with the Best Female College Athlete ESPY Award to create the Best College Athlete ESPY Award for the 2018 ceremony, and again since the award was reestablished in 2021, the winner has been chosen by online voting through choices selected by the ESPN Select Nominating Committee. Before that, determination of the winners was made by an panel of experts. Through the 2001 iteration of the ESPY Awards, ceremonies were conducted in February of each year to honor achievements over the previous calendar year; awards presented thereafter are conferred in July and reflect performance from the June previous. (Note: Because of the rescheduling of the ESPY Awards ceremony, the award presented in 2002 was given in consideration of performance betwixt February 2001 and June 2002.)

The inaugural winner of the Best Male College Athlete ESPY Award in 2002 was Iowa State Cyclones wrestler Cael Sanderson who ended his collegiate career that year. In that period, he surpassed numerous NCAA records, clinched four NCAA wrestling championships, and went 159–0 undefeated in his final season. Florida Gators quarterback Tim Tebow received the trophy in 2008, and won it again the following year, becoming the only sportsman in the history of the award to have won it more than once. American football players have been the most successful at the awards with 12 wins. The most recent winner of the award is LSU Tigers quarterback Jayden Daniels.

Beginning in 2021, the awards were again separated into men's and women's versions using the current naming scheme.

== Winners ==
ESPY Award for Best College Athlete, Men's Sports winners and nominees
Year	Image	Winner	University	Sport	Other nominees	Ref(s)
2002	—	Cael Sanderson	Iowa State Cyclones	Wrestling	Shane Battier – Duke Blue Devils (Basketball); Eric Crouch – Nebraska Cornhuskers (Football); Juan Dixon – Maryland Terrapins (Basketball); Jay Williams – Duke Blue Devils (Basketball)	
2003	Carmelo Anthony in 2011	Carmelo Anthony	Syracuse Orangemen	Basketball	T. J. Ford – Texas Longhorns (Basketball); Eric Larkin – Arizona State Sun Devils (Wrestling); Carson Palmer – USC Trojans (Football)	
2004	Emeka Okafor playing for the Washington Wizards in 2012	Emeka Okafor	Connecticut Huskies	Basketball	Larry Fitzgerald – Pittsburgh Panthers (Football); Jameer Nelson – Saint Joseph's Hawks (Basketball); Jason White – Oklahoma Sooners (Football)	
2005	=Matt Leinart holding a championship trophy above his head in 2005	Matt Leinart	USC Trojans	Football	Andrew Bogut – Utah Utes (Basketball); Alex Gordon – Nebraska Cornhuskers (Baseball); Steve Mocco – Oklahoma State Cowboys (Wrestling); Marty Sertich – Colorado College Tigers (Ice hockey)	
2006	Reggie Bush in 2009	Reggie Bush	USC Trojans	Football	Matt Leinart – USC Trojans (Football); Adam Morrison – Gonzaga Bulldogs (Basketball); J. J. Redick – Duke Blue Devils (Basketball); Vince Young – Texas Longhorns (Football)	
2007	Kevin Durant playing for the Texas Longhorns in 2007	Kevin Durant	Texas Longhorns	Basketball	Ben Askren – Missouri Tigers (Wrestling); Greg Oden – Ohio State Buckeyes (Basketball); Troy Smith – Ohio State Buckeyes (Football)	
2008	Tim Tebow in 2007	Tim Tebow	Florida Gators	Football	Michael Beasley – Kansas State Wildcats (Basketball); Tyler Hansbrough – North Carolina Tar Heels (Basketball)	
2009	Tim Tebow at the White House in 2009	Tim Tebow (2)	Florida Gators	Football	Sam Bradford – Oklahoma Sooners (Football); Matt Gilroy – Boston University Terriers (Ice hockey); Blake Griffin – Oklahoma Sooners (Basketball); Stephen Strasburg – San Diego State Aztecs (Baseball)	
2010	John Wall playing for the Washington Wizards in 2010	John Wall	Kentucky Wildcats	Basketball	Blake Geoffrion – Wisconsin Badgers (Ice hockey); Mark Ingram II – Alabama Crimson Tide (Football); Evan Turner – Ohio State Buckeyes (Basketball); Garrett Wittels – FIU Panthers (Baseball)	
2011	Jimmer Fredette playing for the Sacramento Kings in 2013	Jimmer Fredette	BYU Cougars	Basketball	Andy Miele – Miami RedHawks (Ice hockey); Cam Newton – Auburn Tigers (Football); Rob Pannell – Cornell Big Red (Lacrosse); Kemba Walker – Connecticut Huskies (Basketball)	
2012	Robert Griffin III attending the 2012 NFL Draft	Robert Griffin III	Baylor Bears	Football	Jack Connolly – Minnesota–Duluth Bulldogs (Ice hockey); Anthony Davis – Kentucky Wildcats (Basketball); Andrew Luck – Stanford Cardinal (Football); Mike Zunino – Florida Gators (Baseball)	
2013	Johnny Manziel training for the Cleveland Browns in 2014	Johnny Manziel	Texas A&M Aggies	Football	Trey Burke – Michigan Wolverines (Basketball); Kyle Dake – Cornell Big Red (Wrestling); Drew LeBlanc – St. Cloud State Huskies (Ice hockey)	
2014	Doug McDermott scoring in a basketball game in 2014	Doug McDermott	Creighton Bluejays	Basketball	Johnny Gaudreau – Boston College Eagles (Ice hockey); David Taylor – Penn State Nittany Lions (Wrestling); Lyle Thompson – Albany Great Danes (Lacrosse); Jameis Winston – Florida State Seminoles (Football)	
2015	Marcus Mariota playing for the Oregon Ducks football team in 2013	Marcus Mariota	Oregon Ducks	Football	Jack Eichel – Boston University Terriers (Ice hockey); Frank Kaminsky – Wisconsin Badgers (Basketball); Logan Stieber – Ohio State Buckeyes (Wrestling); Dansby Swanson – Vanderbilt Commodores (Baseball)	
2016	Buddy Hield playing for the Oklahoma Sooners in a basketball game in 2016	Buddy Hield	Oklahoma Sooners	Basketball	Alex Dieringer – Oklahoma State Cowboys (Wrestling); Derrick Henry – Alabama Crimson Tide (Football); Jarrion Lawson – Arkansas Razorbacks (Track and field); Jordan Morris – Stanford Cardinal (Soccer)	
2017	Deshaun Watson in 2016	Deshaun Watson	Clemson Tigers	Football	Ian Harkes – Wake Forest Demon Deacons (Soccer); Frank Mason III – Kansas Jayhawks (Basketball); Matt Rambo – Maryland Terrapins (Lacrosse); Zain Retherford – Penn State Nittany Lions (Wrestling)	
2018–2020	—	Not awarded				
2021	DeVonta Smith in 2019	DeVonta Smith	Alabama Crimson Tide	Football	Gloire Amanda – Oregon State Beavers (Soccer); Luka Garza – Iowa Hawkeyes (Basketball); Trevor Lawrence – Clemson Tigers (Football)	
2022	Young in 2023	Bryce Young	Alabama Crimson Tide	Football	Chet Holmgren – Gonzaga (Basketball); Dante Polvara – Georgetown (Soccer); Logan Wisnauskas – Maryland (Lacrosse)	
2023	Williams in 2021	Caleb Williams	USC Trojans	Football	Duncan McGuire – Creighton (Soocer); Brennan O'Neill – Duke (Lacrosse); Zach Edey – Purdue (Basketball)	
2024	Daniels in 2024	Jayden Daniels	LSU Tigers	Football	Zach Edey – Purdue (Basketball); Ousmane Sylla – Clemson (Soccer); Pat Kavanagh – Notre Dame (Lacrosse)	
2025	Flagg in 2025	Cooper Flagg	Duke Blue Devils	Basketball	Wyatt Hendrickson – Oklahoma State (Wrestling); Travis Hunter – Colorado (Football); CJ Kirst – Cornell (Lacrosse)	
2026	Mendoza in 2026	Fernando Mendoza	Indiana Hoosiers	Football	Cameron Boozer – Duke (Basketball); Mitchell Mesenbrink – Penn State (Wrestling); Donavan Phillip – NC State (Soccer)	

== Statistics ==
Winners by college team represented
Team	Wins	Nominations
USC Trojans	3	5
Alabama Crimson Tide	2	4
Florida Gators	2	3
Duke Blue Devils	1	6
Oklahoma Sooners	1	4
Clemson Tigers	1	3
Texas Longhorns	1	3
Kentucky Wildcats	1	2
UConn Huskies	1	2
LSU Tigers	1	1
Indiana Hoosiers	1	1
Ohio State Buckeyes	0	4
Cornell Big Red	0	3
Maryland Terrapins	0	3
Oklahoma State Cowboys	0	3
Penn State Nittany Lions	0	3
Boston University Terriers	0	2
Gonzaga Bulldogs	0	2
Nebraska Cornhuskers	0	2
Purdue Boilermakers	0	2
Creighton Bluejays	0	2
NC State Wolfpack	0	1

Winners and nominees by sport
Sport	Winners	Nominations
Basketball	8	31
Football	13	28
Wrestling	1	11
Ice hockey	0	8
Lacrosse	0	7
Soccer	0	7
Baseball	0	5
Track and field	0	1

== See also ==
- Best Female College Athlete ESPY Award
- Sporting News College Athlete of the Year
- National Collegiate Athletic Association awards
- All-America
- Today's Top 10 Award
