= Blue Darter Trophy =

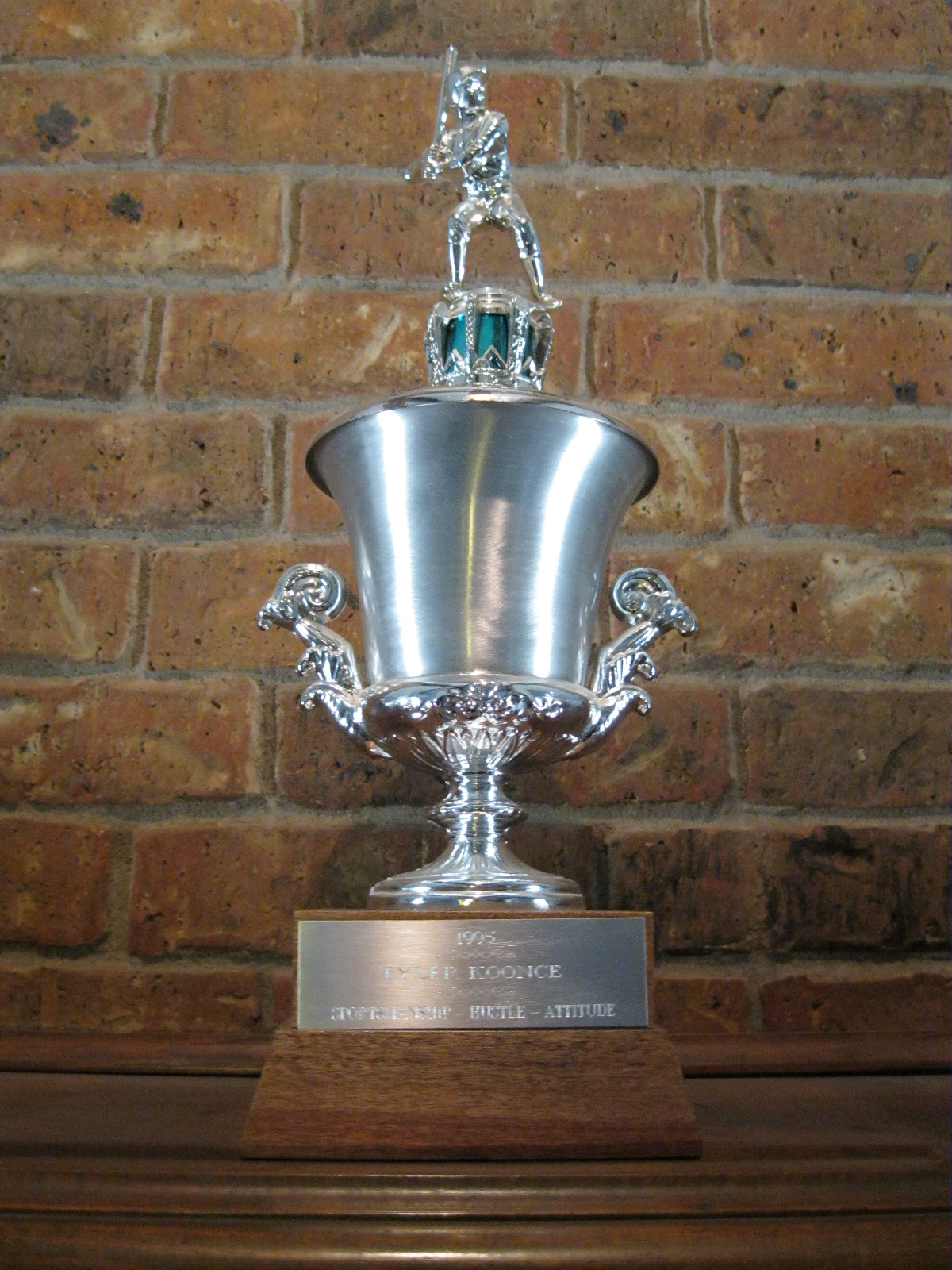
Blue Darter Trophy

The Blue Darter Trophy is awarded annually to young persons playing in the Lee's Summit Baseball Association and Lee's Summit Girls Softball Association.

It is not awarded to baseball and softball players based on skill or athletic ability, but on the basis of their sportsmanship, "hustle," and having a positive attitude. Individual trophies are awarded to one player in each LSBA and LSGSA division.

The trophy was conceived of and first awarded in 1971 by James P. Shoot, who was a baseball and softball coach for many years in Lee's Summit. From 1971 until his death in 1998, Coach Shoot personally handed out the trophies to the young recipients, assisted by his wife Gwendolyn. For several years after 1998 Gwendolyn Shoot took over the role as trophy presenter. Today the associations themselves award the trophies to the players.

== Origins of the name ==
The term "blue darter" is a baseball term referring to a low line drive that "speeds viciously through the air, as though it were propelled by a blue gas flame." The term came to be associated with the line drives hit by Shoeless Joe Jackson and was popularized by ballplayer and sportscaster Dizzy Dean. A "blue darter" is also a Midwestern and Southern colloquialism for either a fast hawk or a quick snake darting through a bush.

Coach Shoot had previously attempted a business venture to market wooden baseball bats under the brand name "Blue Darter." When that endeavor fizzled, he re-purposed the name to his award for sportsmanship.

== See also ==
- List of sports awards honoring women
