= WPS Player of the Month =

Monthly soccer award

The Women's Professional Soccer Player of Month is a monthly soccer award for players in Women's Professional Soccer.

The nominees are the Player of the week winners plus some proposals of WPS to usually get to 6 nominees. The voting is then open to media, fans and the teams with a waiting of 1/3 each.

== Winners ==
Month	Player of the Month	Club	Month's Statline
April 2009	(England) Kelly Smith	Boston Breakers	3 G, 1 A in 3 games; Breakers 2-2-0 in April
May	(France) Sonia Bompastor	Washington Freedom	2 G, 3 A in 4 games; Freedom 2-0-2 in May
June	(France) Camille Abily	Los Angeles Sol	5 G in 6 games; Sol 4-0-2 in June
July	(United States) Abby Wambach	Washington Freedom	4 G, 1 A in 5 games; Freedom 3-2-1 in July
April 2010	(United States) Lori Lindsey	Philadelphia Independence	
May	(England) Karen Bardsley	Sky Blue FC	
June	(United States) Amy Rodriguez	Philadelphia Independence	
July	(United States) Jordan Angeli	Boston Breakers	
August	(England) Kelly Smith	Boston Breakers	
May 2011	(United States) McCall Zerboni	Western New York Flash	

== See also ==
- List of sports awards honoring women
