= Amy Rodriguez =

American soccer player (born 1987)

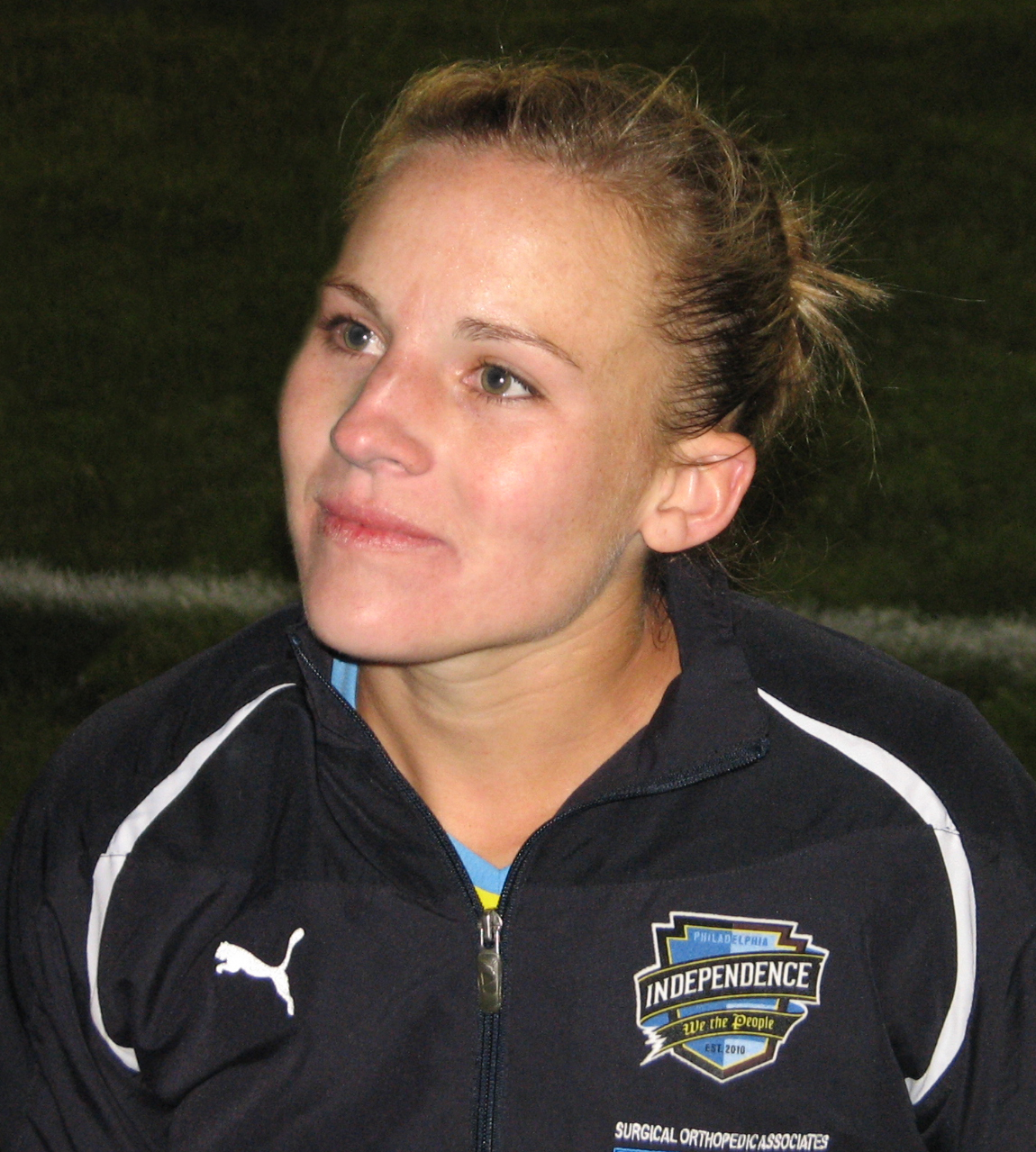
- Rodriguez with Philadelphia Independence in 2010

Personal information
- Full name: Amy Joy Rodriguez Shilling
- Birth name: Amy Joy Rodriguez
- Date of birth: February 17, 1987 (age 39)
- Place of birth: Lake Forest, California, United States
- Height: 5 ft 4 in (1.63 m)
- Position: Forward

College career
Years	Team	Apps	(Gls)
2005–2008	USC Trojans		

Senior career*
Years	Team	Apps	(Gls)
2008	West Coast FC	0	(0)
2009	Boston Breakers	17	(1)
2010–2011	Philadelphia Independence	37	(17)
2014–2017	FC Kansas City	38	(26)
2018–2020	Utah Royals	47	(15)
2021	Kansas City	10	(2)
2021	North Carolina Courage	15	(3)

International career^{‡}
- United States U-17
	United States U-19/U-20	19	(11)
- United States U-21
2005–2018	United States	132	(30)

Managerial career
- 2022–2023: USC Trojans (assistant)
- 2024: Utah Royals
Medal record
Women's soccer
Representing the United States
Olympic Games
Gold medal – first place	2008 Beijing	Team
Gold medal – first place	2012 London	Team
FIFA Women's World Cup
Gold medal – first place	2015 Canada	Team
Silver medal – second place	2011 Germany	Team
- * Club domestic league appearances and goals as of 28 January 2022 ‡ National team caps and goals as of 4 September 2018

Amy Joy Rodriguez Shilling (née Rodriguez; born February 17, 1987) is an American soccer coach and retired professional player who most recently served as head coach of Utah Royals of the National Women's Soccer League (NWSL). During a career that spanned 13 seasons, she played as a forward for the North Carolina Courage, Utah Royals FC, FC Kansas City, and the Boston Breakers, as well as Philadelphia Independence of the WPS. A former member of the United States women's national soccer team, she was on the Women's World Cup-winning team in 2015.

== Early life ==
Born in Lake Forest, California, to parents John and Lori, She grew up in Lake Forest, California and attended Santa Margarita Catholic High School in Rancho Santa Margarita, California, where she was a Parade All-American in 2003 and 2004 and the Gatorade Player of the Year in 2005. Her paternal grandparents were from Cuba and immigrated to the United States in the 1950s. She has a sister named Lauren and brother named Adam. Her paternal uncle is Francis Rodriguez and former wide receiver for the USC Trojans 1982-83.

In 2005, Rodriguez was considered the nation's top recruit and was named National Player of the Year by Parade Magazine, EA Sports and NSCAA after scoring 17 goals in 15 games for Santa Margarita Catholic during her senior year. She earned local honors as the Orange County Register Player of the Year and Girls Soccer Player of the Year, as well as the Los Angeles Times Girls' Soccer Player of the Year. She was a four-time all-league selection and All-CIF honoree.

=== University of Southern California ===
Rodriguez was recruited by and eventually attended the University of Southern California. She played for the Trojans women's soccer team from 2005 through 2008. She finished her career at USC as the number four all-time scorer and was considered a cornerstone in the team's first-ever NCAA Women's Soccer Championship. Rodriguez holds the school's second career game-winning goal record with 12, is number four all-time in career points with 79, and is ranked sixth in career assists with 17.

During her freshman year, Rodriguez led the team with nine goals, 25 points and four game-winners. She was named Pac-10 Player of the Week and to the Soccer America National Team of the Week after scoring back-to-back game-winning goals in 1–0 wins over Arizona State University and the University of Arizona. She was named the 2005 Pac-10 Freshman of the Year, a member of the Soccer Times All-America Third Team, and was selected to the All-Pac-10 First Team and Pac-10 All-Freshman Team. She was also named a SoccerBuzz Freshman All-American first-teamer and SoccerBuzz All-West Region first-teamer the same year.

In 2006, Rodriguez missed USC's first four games while competing with the United States under-20 national team at the U-20 World Championships. After returning, she started 14 of 16 games and scored the game-winning goal in USC's NCAA first-round upset of Santa Clara. She finished the season with four goals and three assists.

Rodriguez appeared in all 25 games as a junior in 2007, starting in 21 matches on her way to leading the Trojans in scoring and to the national championship. She finished with a team-high of 10 goals along with three assists for 23 points on the year and had three game-winning goals. Her first career two-goal game occurred in the NCAA Semifinals, where she scored twice in the second half to help USC to a 2–1 win and help earn herself honors as the NCAA College Cup Most Outstanding Offensive Player. The same year, she was named Umbro/Soccer News Net Player of the Year and was named to the All-Pac-10 Second Team. She also earned SoccerBuzz Second Team All-West Region and NSCAA/adidas Second Team All-West Region honors. Rodriguez was named to the Soccer America Team of the Week on October 2 after notching the game-winner against then number two Portland. She finished the season ranked sixth in all-time in career points (59), seventh in goals (23), sixth in assists (13) and fourth in game-winning goals (9).

During her senior year in 2008, Rodriguez missed the first three games of the season due to competing with the United States women's national soccer team at the 2008 Summer Olympics, where she won a gold medal. She was USC's top scorer with eight goals (including three game-winning goals) during the season, provided four assists finishing with 20 points. Rodriguez was named a Preseason All-American and was on the watch list for the Hermann Trophy. She was selected to the All-Pac-10 First Team and was an NSCAA All-American Third Team pick.

== Club career ==
Amy Rodriguez played for the Los Angeles Strikers as her club team.

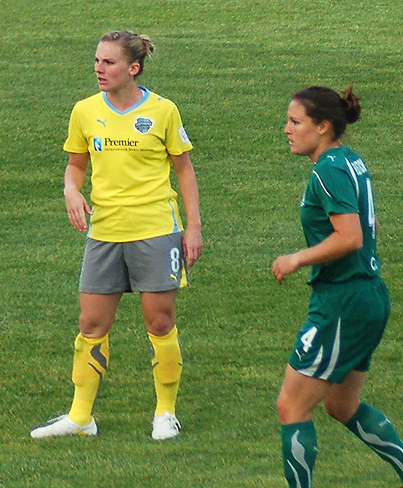
Rodriguez playing against the Athletica.

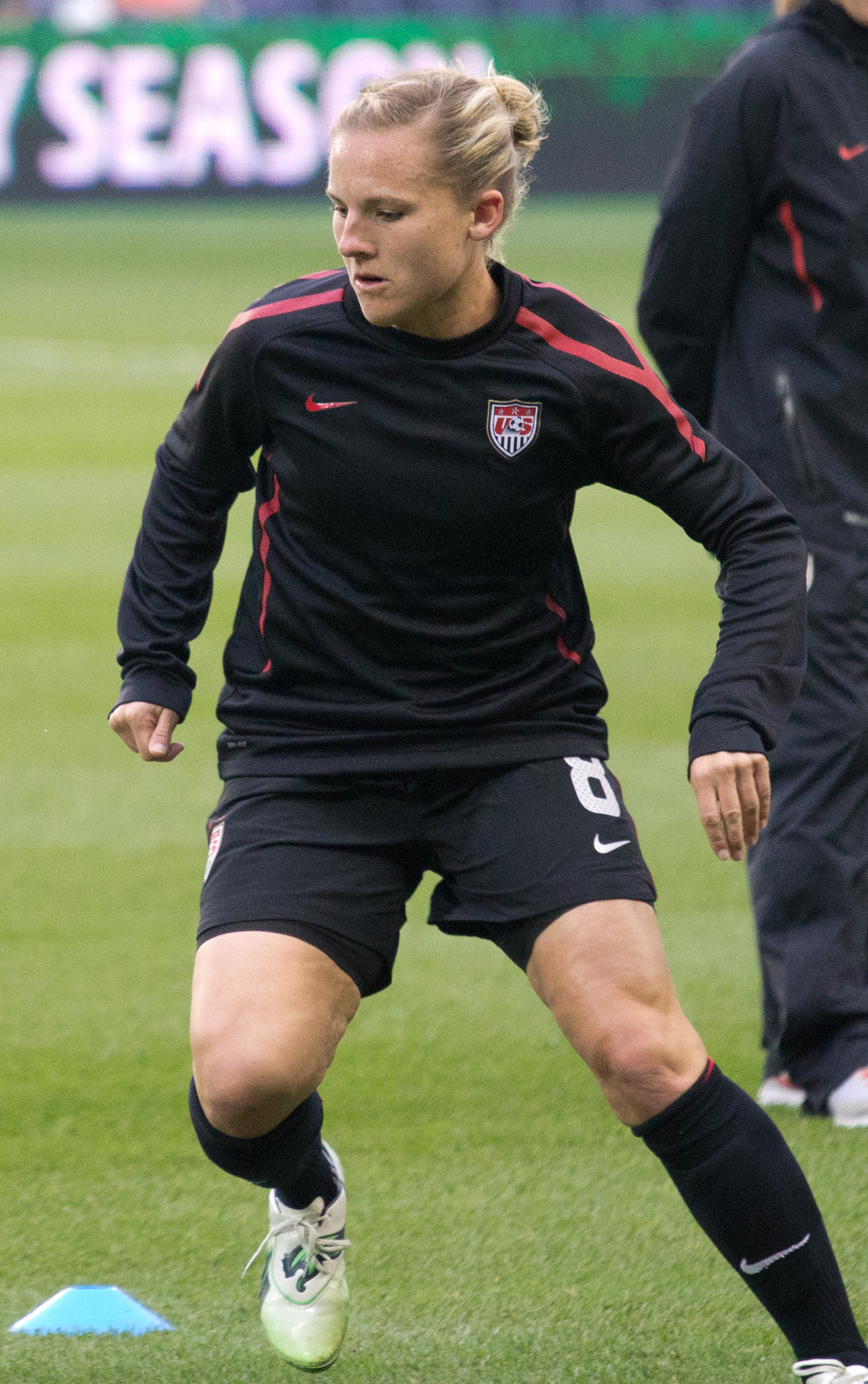
Amy Rodriguez of the United States women's national soccer team before a 2011 friendly against Canada.

=== West Coast FC, 2008 ===
Rodriguez signed to play with West Coast FC of Women's Premier Soccer League in 2008. However, an injury to Abby Wambach propelled Rodriguez to the United States women's national team to compete at the 2008 Summer Olympics. She never appeared for West Coast FC.

=== Boston Breakers, 2009 ===
Upon her return from the 2008 Summer Olympics, the new top-tier women's soccer league in the United States, Women's Professional Soccer, made Rodriguez the first overall pick in the 2009 WPS Draft. Her playing rights were assigned to the Boston Breakers. During the inaugural season, Rodriguez appeared in 17 matches (11 starts, 982 minutes) and scored one goal. The Breakers finished the season in fifth place with a 7–9–4 record.

=== Philadelphia Independence, 2009–2011 ===
On September 29, 2009, Rodriguez was traded with Boston's first round selection in the 2010 WPS Draft to WPS expansion team, the Philadelphia Independence, in exchange for Philadelphia's first two selections in the 2010 WPS Draft.

During the 2010 season, Rodriguez scored 12 goals and had six assists. She was named the WPS Player of the Month for June 2010. Rodriguez finished third in the league in goals and scored the winning goal in the first round of the playoffs in overtime against the Washington Freedom to send her team to the Super Semifinal. She finished second on the team in minutes played with 2,001. She was named to the WPS Best XI and a starter in the WPS All-Star Game. She was also a finalist for the WPS Michelle Akers Player of the Year Award and was named the Independence's Most Valuable Offensive Player.

During a 2011 regular season shortened for Rodriguez due to her national team duty, Amy played in 10 games for the Independence (starting six) for a total of 641 minutes and tallied two regular season goals. She scored in both of Philadelphia's playoff matches, tallying the second goal in the 2–0 victory over magicJack in the Super Semifinal and the equalizer in the 88th minute of the championship game against the Western New York Flash, sending the game to overtime before Philly eventually fell in penalty kicks.

=== FC Kansas City, 2013–2017 ===
In 2013, as part of the NWSL Player Allocation, she joined Seattle Reign FC in the new National Women's Soccer League. About a month after the allocation, Seattle announced that Rodriguez was pregnant and would not be available to play for the 2013 season. She was later traded to FC Kansas City for Kristie Mewis during the 2013–14 off-season, making her debut for the Midwest club in a preseason exhibition match against the Chicago Red Stars.

On August 31, 2014 Rodriguez scored two goals for FC Kansas City in a 2–1 win against Seattle Reign FC, both on assists provided by Lauren Holiday, to help the club win the 2014 NWSL Championship. In 2015 FC Kansas City reached the Championship game once again and Rodriguez scored the game-winning (and lone) goal off an assist from Heather O'Reilly to win the 2015 NWSL Championship; she was named the match's MVP. Rodriguez missed the 2016 NWSL season as she was pregnant with her second child.

Rodriguez returned to FC Kansas City for the 2017 NWSL season. In the first game of the season she scored a goal in the 48th minute, however minutes later she suffered a knee injury and was forced to leave the game. It was announced that Rodriguez had torn her ACL and would miss the rest of the season.

=== Utah Royals FC, 2018–2020 ===
After FC Kansas ceased operations in November 2017, her rights were transferred to the Utah Royals. In February 2018, she committed to joining the Royals. Rodriguez began the 2018 season on the 45-Day disabled list as she was still recovering from her knee injury. On April 20 she made her debut for the Royals and she scored her first goal for Utah a week later on April 28. Rodriguez finished the season with 5 goals, which was the second highest on the team. She signed a contract with Utah prior to the 2019 NWSL season as she was no longer an allocated player by U.S. Soccer.

On June 15, 2019, Rodriguez contributed the game's only goal in a win over Sky Blue FC on a lengthy, slaloming run finished with a 25-yard shot from outside the box to the upper corner, with her effort ultimately earning a nomination for the FIFA Puskás Award as one of the year's most beautiful goals.

=== North Carolina Courage, 2021 ===
On 22 July 2021, she and $60,000 of allocation money was traded from Kansas City to the Courage for Kristen Hamilton, Hailie Mace and Katelyn Rowland.

== International career ==
=== National youth teams ===
Rodriguez played for several United States national youth teams, appearing in two FIFA youth championships: the 2004 U-19 World Championship in Thailand and the 2006 U-20 World Championship in Russia, as well as the 2005 Nordic Cup in Sweden. In total, she's played with the U-17, U-19/U-20 and U-21 programs.

=== Senior national team ===
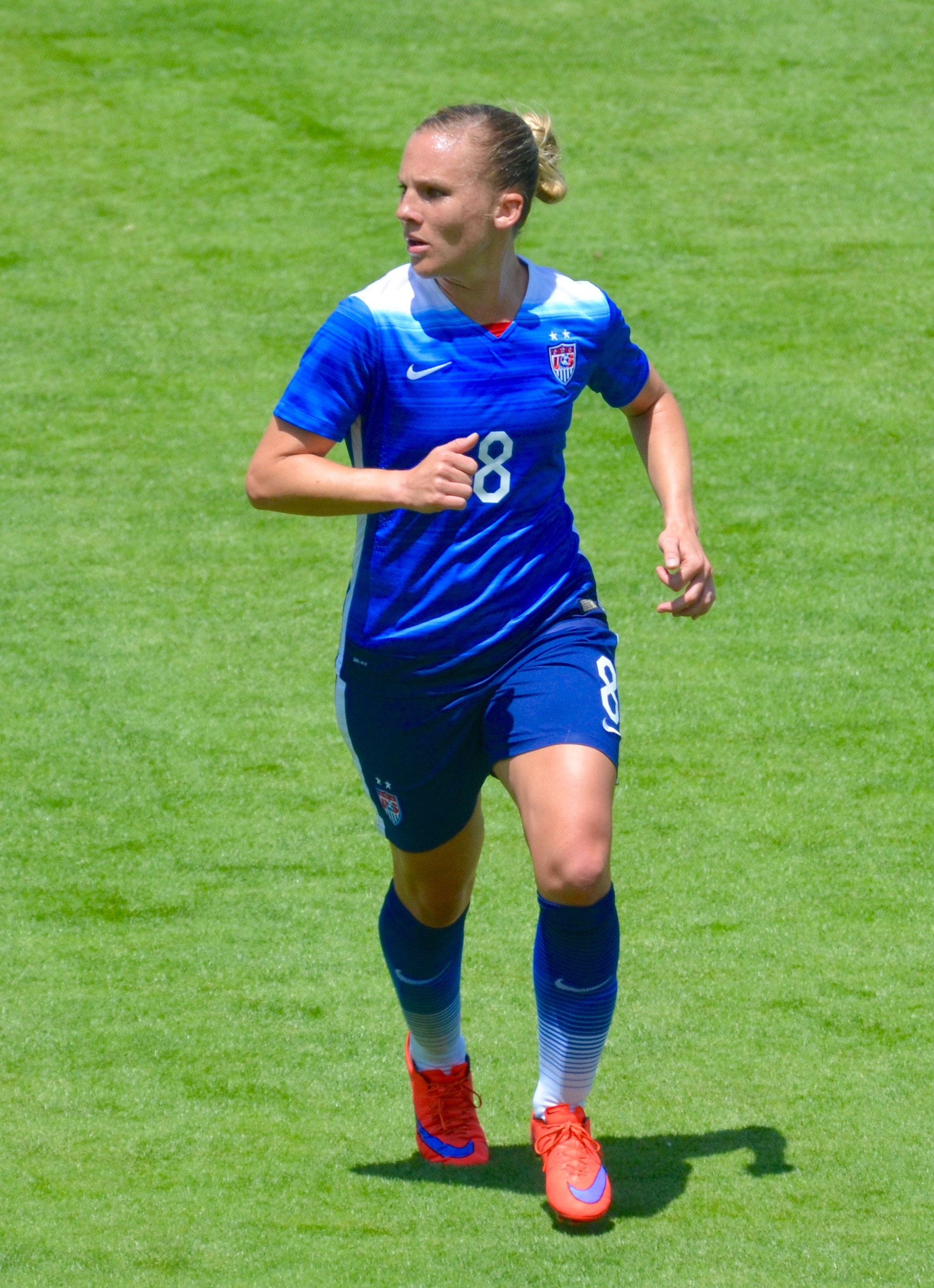

Rodriguez's first appearance for the United States women's national team came on March 11, 2005, against Finland in the Algarve Cup while she was a senior in high school. She earned two caps, playing as a sub against Finland and Denmark.

In 2008, Rodriguez played in 26 matches, starting in 11. She scored her first two full international goals in the first match of the year against Canada and added another against Norway in the Algarve Cup.

She scored six goals with seven assists during the same year, including two game-winners against Brazil in 1–0 victories at the Peace Queen Cup in South Korea and during a friendly match in Commerce City, Colorado, before the Olympics.

=== 2008 Beijing Olympics ===
By the spring of 2008, she had become a regular as forward, and started four of five games at the 2008 Summer Olympics, where she scored against New Zealand. Rodriguez had appeared in 18 senior team matches going into the Olympics. Rodriguez provided the assist on Carli Lloyd's game-winning goal in the first period of extra time in the gold medal match to clinch the title.

=== 2011 FIFA Women's World Cup ===
In 2011, Rodriguez started all 18 games she played for the United States and recorded 1,102 minutes of playing time. She scored four goals with three assists. She played in her first FIFA Women's World Cup at the senior level, starting the first five matches of the tournament.

Rodriguez scored one of the biggest goals of her career in the second leg of the playoff series against Italy, pounding in the game-winner in a 1–0 victory on November 27 at Toyota Park in Bridgeview, Illinois. She started both legs of the playoff series and played all but five minutes over the two games.

=== 2012 London Olympics ===
Rodriguez scored five goals in a 2012 CONCACAF Olympic qualifying match between the United States and the Dominican Republic; the final score of the match was 14–0. Rodriguez's performance set a record for goals scored in a single match by one player in CONCACAF Olympic qualifying, and tied the single-game record for the United States national team. Both records were tied two days later by her teammate, Sydney Leroux, in a game against Guatemala.

Rodriguez was a member of the team that competed in the 2012 London Olympics. She played four matches as a substitute and received her second Olympic gold medal, the gold medal from the 2008 Beijing Olympics being her first.

In 2012, Rodriguez had nine goals off the bench to tie for the second most in United States women's national team history with Debbie Keller.

On December 8, 2012, Rodriguez celebrated her 100th cap with the senior national team during an international friendly against China at Ford Field in Detroit, Michigan. She wore the captain's armband, a team tradition for players in their 100th national team appearance, during the 2–0 win.

=== 2013–2014 ===
In January 2013, Rodriguez announced that she was pregnant with her first child and would miss all of 2013. She returned to the National Team in January 2014 and was named to the 2014 Algarve Cup roster. Rodiguez was named to the roster for the 2014 CONCACAF Women's Championship, she appeared in 2 matches as the United States won the tournament for the seventh time. She appeared in twelve matches in 2014 and scored 2 goals.

=== 2015 FIFA Women's World Cup ===
Rodriguez was named to the United States roster for the 2015 Algarve Cup, she scored in a group stage game against Switzerland. The U.S. won the Algarve Cup for the tenth time. In April, Rodriguez was named to the final 23-player roster for the 2015 FIFA Women's World Cup, this would be her second time playing in a World Cup as she was also a member of the team in 2011.

At the 2015 World Cup Rodriguez appeared in two matches. She was in the starting lineup for their quarterfinal match against China PR, which the U.S won 1–0. The United States went on to win the 2015 World Cup by defeating Japan 5–2.

=== 2016–2018 ===
In January 2016, Rodriguez announced that she was expecting her second child and would miss the 2016 Olympics. After giving birth, Rodriguez returned to the National Team in April 2017 in a friendly against Russia. After tearing her ACL in a match with FC Kansas City, Rodriguez would miss the rest of 2017.

After recovering from her knee injury, Rodriguez was called up in June 2018 for a set of friendlies against China PR. She was also named to the roster for the 2018 Tournament of Nations, the U.S won the tournament, but Rodriguez did not get any playing time. She was named to the 35-player provisional roster for the 2018 CONCACAF Women's Championship but she was not named to the final 20-player squad.

=== International summary ===
Year	Apps	Starts	Min	Gls	Asts
2005	2	0	61	0	0
2006	3	0	43	0	0
2008	26	11	1359	6	7
2009	7	5	396	0	1
2010	17	13	991	7	1
2011	18	18	1102	4	3
2012	29	5	904	9	5
2014	12	4	375	2	2
2015	15	5	589	2	3
2017	1	0	10	0	0
2018	2	0	43	0	0
Total	132	56	5873	30	19

Updated through 2019-04-22

=== International goals ===
Key (expand for notes on "international goals" and sorting)
Location	Geographic location of the venue where the competition occurred Sorted by country name first, then by city name
Lineup	Start – played entire match on minute (off player) – substituted on at the minute indicated, and player was substituted off at the same time off minute (on player) – substituted off at the minute indicated, and player was substituted on at the same time (c) – captain Sorted by minutes played
#	NumberOfGoals.goalNumber scored by the player in the match (alternate notation to Goal in match)
Min	The minute in the match the goal was scored. For list that include caps, blank indicates played in the match but did not score a goal.
Assist/pass	The ball was passed by the player, which assisted in scoring the goal. This column depends on the availability and source of this information.
penalty or pk	Goal scored on penalty-kick which was awarded due to foul by opponent. (Goals scored in penalty-shoot-out, at the end of a tied match after extra-time, are not included.)
Score	The match score after the goal was scored. Sorted by goal difference, then by goal scored by the player's team
Result	The final score. Sorted by goal difference in the match, then by goal difference in penalty-shoot-out if it is taken, followed by goal scored by the player's team in the match, then by goal scored in the penalty-shoot-out. For matches with identical final scores, match ending in extra-time without penalty-shoot-out is a tougher match, therefore precede matches that ended in regulation
aet	The score at the end of extra-time; the match was tied at the end of 90' regulation
pso	Penalty-shoot-out score shown in parentheses; the match was tied at the end of extra-time
	Green background color – exhibition or closed door international friendly match
	Yellow background color – match at an invitational tournament
	Red background color – Olympic women's football qualification match
	Light-blue background color – FIFA women's world cup qualification match
	Pink background color – Olympic women's football tournament
NOTE: some keys may not apply for a particular football player

	Date	Location	Opponent	Lineup	#	Min	Assist/pass	Score	Result	Competition
1	2008-01-16	Guangzhou	Canada	Start	2.1	51	Heather O'Reilly	1–0	4–0	Four Nations Tournament
2	2008-01-16	Guangzhou	Canada	Start	2.2	65	Heather O'Reilly	2–0	4–0	Four Nations Tournament
3	2008-03-10	Alvor	Norway	on 63' (off Kai)	1.1	90	Abby Wambach	4–0	4–0	Algarve Cup: Group B
4	2008-06-17	Suwon	Brazil	Start	1.1	41	unassisted	1–0	1–0	Peace Queen Cup: Group B
5	2008-07-13	Commerce	Brazil	on 46' (off Kai)	1.1	71	Abby Wambach	1–0	1–0	Friendly
6	2008-08-12	Shenyang	New Zealand	off 56' (on Kai)	1.1	43	Rachel Buehler	2–0	4–0	Olympics: Group B
7	2010-03-28	San Diego	Mexico	off 46' (on Cheney)	1.1	12	Heather O'Reilly	1–0	3–0	Friendly
8	2010-07-13	Omaha	Sweden	Start	1.1	44	Abby Wambach	1–0	1–1	Friendly
9	2010-10-28	Cancun	Haiti	off 57' (on Cheney)	1.1	40	Abby Wambach	3–0	5–0	World Cup qualifier: Group B
10	2010-10-30	Cancun	Guatemala	Start	3.1	21	Heather O'Reilly	1–0	9–0	World Cup qualifier: Group B
11	2010-10-30	Cancun	Guatemala	Start	3.2	45+	Carli Lloyd	6–0	9–0	World Cup qualifier: Group B
12	2010-10-30	Cancun	Guatemala	Start	3.3	88	Alex Morgan	9–0	9–0	World Cup qualifier: Group B
13	2010-11-27	Bridgeview	Italy	Start	1.1	40	Megan Rapinoe	1–0	1–0	World Cup qualifier: playoff 2
14	2011-01-25	Chongqing	China	off 71' (on Morgan)	1.1	67	Tobin Heath	1–0	2–0	Four Nations Tournament
15	2011-03-02	Santo Antonio	Japan	off 63' (on Morgan)	1.1	7	Lauren Cheney	1–0	2–1	Algarve Cup: Group B
16	2011-05-14	Columbus	Japan	off 64' (on Cheney)	1.1	37	Abby Wambach	2–0	2–0	Friendly
17	2011-05-18	Cary	Japan	off 61' (on Morgan)	1.1	28	Heather O'Reilly	1–0	2–0	Friendly
18	2012-01-20	Vancouver	Dominican Republic	on 46' (off Heath)	5.1	46	Lauren Cheney	8–0	14–0	Olympic qualifier: Group B
19	2012-01-20	Vancouver	Dominican Republic	on 46' (off Heath)	5.2	48	Lauren Cheney	9–0	14–0	Olympic qualifier: Group B
20	2012-01-20	Vancouver	Dominican Republic	on 46' (off Heath)	5.3	58	unassisted	10–0	14–0	Olympic qualifier: Group B
21	2012-01-20	Vancouver	Dominican Republic	on 46' (off Heath)	5.4	69	Lauren Cheney	12–0	14–0	Olympic qualifier: Group B
22	2012-01-20	Vancouver	Dominican Republic	on 46' (off Heath)	5.5	75	Alex Morgan	13–0	14–0	Olympic qualifier: Group B
23	2012-01-22	Vancouver	Guatemala	Start	1.1	29	Abby Wambach	4–0	13–0	Olympic qualifier: Group B
24	2012-04-03	Chiba	Brazil	on 71' (off Morgan)	1.1	83	unassisted	3–0	3–0	Kirin Challenge Cup
25	2012-06-30	Sandy	Canada	on 51' (off Morgan)	1.1	85	unassisted	2–1	2–1	Friendly
26	2012-12-12	Houston	China	on 75' (off Morgan)	1.1	85	Heather O'Reilly	4–0	4–0	Friendly
27	2014-02-13	Atlanta	Russia	on 75' (off Leroux)	1.1	52	Heather O'Reilly	3–0	8–0	Friendly
28	2014-09-18	Rochester	Mexico	off 45' (on Morgan)	1.1	9	Megan Rapinoe	1–0	4–0	Friendly
29	2015-03-06	Santo Antonio	Norway	on 46' (off Rapinoe)	1.1	72	unassisted	2–0	3–0	Algarve Cup
30	2015-09-17	Birmingham	Haiti	off 63' (on O'Reilly)	1.1	51	Kelley O'Hara	6–0	8–0	Friendly

== Retirement ==
On January 28, 2022, Rodriguez announced her retirement from professional soccer as a player.

== Managerial career ==
In August 2021 during her final NWSL playing season, Rodriguez registered for U.S. Soccer's B-license coaching course for current and former players.

=== USC Trojans (assistant) ===
Upon announcing her retirement from playing, Rodriguez also announced that she had accepted a position as an assistant coach at her alma mater, the University of Southern California, women's soccer team.

=== Utah Royals FC ===
On April 20, 2023, the second iteration of NWSL club Utah Royals FC announced that Rodriguez would be the club's first head coach when the team returns to the league in 2024. Rodriguez had played with Utah Royals FC president Michelle Hyncik in youth soccer and high school, and Hyncik credited their personal connection for the hiring decision. As of April 2023, Rodriguez was working toward the U.S. Soccer A-level coaching license required for the role.

On June 30, 2024, Rodriguez was relieved of her duties as head coach after a 2-11-2 start to the season.

== Honors and awards ==
=== International ===
- Olympic Gold Medal: 2008, 2012
- FIFA Women's World Cup: 2015; Runner-up: 2011
- CONCACAF Women's Championship: 2014
- CONCACAF Women's Olympic Qualifying Tournament: 2012
- Algarve Cup: 2008, 2010, 2011, 2015
- Four Nations Tournament: 2008, 2011
- Tournament of Nations: 2018

=== Club ===
with FC Kansas City

- NWSL championship: 2014, 2015

=== Individual ===
- WPS Player of the Month: June 2010
- WPS Best XI: 2010
- WPS All-Star Team: 2010
- NWSL Best XI: 2014
- NWSL Championship Most Valuable Player: 2015
- FIFA Puskás Award nominee: 2019

== Personal life ==
Rodriguez is called "A-Rod" by her teammates and soccer commentators.

Rodriguez married fellow USC athlete Adam Shilling on October 8, 2011. On January 29, 2013, it was confirmed that Rodriguez and her husband were expecting their first child. On August 6, 2013, their first son, Ryan John Shilling, was born. Rodriguez, along with her husband, is a devout Christian. U.S. Soccer announced Rodriguez was pregnant with her second child when they released an article on December 21, 2015 announcing the roster for the next training camp. Their second child, Luke Shilling, was born on July 1, 2016.

== In popular culture ==
=== Video games ===
Rodriguez was featured along with her national teammates in the EA Sports' FIFA video game series in FIFA 16, the first time women players were included in the game.

=== Ticker-tape parade and White House honor ===
Following the United States' win at the 2015 FIFA Women's World Cup, Rodriguez and her teammates became the first women's sports team to be honored with a Ticker Tape Parade in New York City. Each player received a key to the city from Mayor Bill de Blasio. In October of the same year, the team was honored by President Barack Obama at the White House.
