= Best Female College Basketball Player ESPY Award =

Annual athletic award (1993–2001)

- Awarded for: ESPY Award for the best female NCAA basketball player in the previous season
- Country: United States
- Presented by: ESPN

History
- First award: 1993
- Final award: 2001

The Best Female College Basketball Player ESPY Award was presented annually between 1993 and 2001 to the female collegiate basketball player determined to be the best in the NCAA in the previous season. The award was discontinued in 2002 when it was absorbed into the overall Best Female College Athlete ESPY Award.

The award voting panel comprised fans, sportswriters, broadcasters, sports executives, and retired sportspersons, termed collectively "experts", as well as ESPN personalities from amongst choices selected by the ESPN Select Nominating Committee.

Year	Player	Team	Position	Class	Reference
1993	Dawn Staley	Virginia	PG	Senior	
1994	Sheryl Swoopes	Texas Tech	SG / SF	Senior	
1995	Charlotte Smith	North Carolina	F	Junior	
1996	Rebecca Lobo	Connecticut	C	Senior	
1997	Saudia Roundtree	Georgia	G	Senior	
1998	Chamique Holdsclaw	Tennessee	SF	Sophomore	
1999	Chamique Holdsclaw (2)	Tennessee	SF	Junior	
2000	Chamique Holdsclaw (3)	Tennessee	SF	Senior	
2001	Tamika Catchings	Tennessee	SF	Junior	

== See also ==
- Best Male College Basketball Player ESPY Award
