= Garrett Wittels =

American baseball player (born 1990)

- Infielder
- Born: May 11, 1990 (age 36); Bay Harbor Islands, Florida, U.S.
- Bats: Right Throws: Right
- Stats at Baseball Reference

Garrett Nicholas Wittels (born May 11, 1990) is an American former professional baseball infielder who played in the St. Louis Cardinals organization.

Wittels played college baseball for the Florida International University Golden Panthers in Miami, Florida. He finished the 2010 season with a 56-game hitting streak, two hits shy of the Division I record. He also set the FIU season record for hits. He was nominated for the Best Male College Athlete ESPY Award for his 2010 performance, won Sun Belt Conference Player of the Year honors, and was named a NCBWA and Louisville Slugger/TPX Preseason All-American prior to the 2011 season.

He played minor league baseball in 2011 and 2012, with the Triple-A Memphis Redbirds of the Pacific Coast League being the highest-level team he played for.

== Personal life ==
His parents are Lishka Wittels (a member of the Jewish-Cuban community, and a descendant of Turkish Jews) and Michael Wittels, an orthopedic surgeon, and he has three siblings. He is from Bay Harbor Islands, Florida and is Jewish. When he was eight years old, his father put a batting cage in their home's backyard. He attended Jewish day school until middle school.

== High school ==
Wittels attended Dr. Michael Krop High School. There, he was Miami Herald Third Team All-Miami Dade in 2006 and 2007, and Second Team All-Miami Dade in 2008. As a senior, he batted .420, with six home runs and 29 RBIs.

== College, and hitting streak ==
Wittels played college baseball for the Florida International University Golden Panthers in Miami, Florida. He was an infielder, playing mainly shortstop but also third base and second base, and a relief pitcher.

Wittels finished the 2010 season, his sophomore year, with a 56-game hitting streak; the same number of games as Joe DiMaggio had in his major-league-record 1941 streak. He finished two hits shy of Robin Ventura's 58-game streak in 1987 (then, as a sophomore with Oklahoma State University), the Division I record. During the streak, he wore the same items of clothing for each game (though he washed them), and did not cut his hair. He chewed the same brand of Bubblicious Watermelon bubble gum every game. Before each game he got down on one knee in the outfield to say the shema, a Jewish prayer.

Wittels was nominated for the Best Male College Athlete ESPY Award for his 2010 performance, won Sun Belt Conference Player of the Year honors, was named to the All-Sun Belt Conference baseball tournament Team, and led FIU to a Sun Belt Conference Baseball Tournament championship. U.S. Congressman Lincoln Díaz-Balart of Florida honored him with laudatory mention in the United States House of Representatives. Sports Illustrated writer Joe Lemire called him: "Arguably the most famous player in Div. 1 baseball".

He batted a league-leading .412, setting the FIU season record with a league-leading 100 hits, and leading the team in doubles (21; third in the league) and RBIs (60). He wore number 10.

Prior to the 2011 season, Wittels was named a Louisville Slugger/TPX Preseason All-American (third base, first team), as well as an All-American by PING! Baseball (utility, first team), the National Collegiate Baseball Writers Association (NCBWA) (second base, second team), American Baseball Coaches Association (ABCA)/Rawlings (utility, second team), and Baseball America (second base, third team).

Under NCAA rules, his streak would have continued had he kept it going into the 2011 season. The streak ended when Wittels went 0 for 4 in the 2011 season opener. Of all major league and NCAA Division 1 hitters, only Ventura and DiMaggio have ever had as long a hitting streak. In 2011, Wittels batted .345.

He finished his FIU career hitting .352 with 7 home runs and 116 RBIs over the course of three seasons.

== False rape accusation ==
On December 27, 2010, Wittels and two friends were falsely accused of raping a 17-year-old girl at the Nassau, Bahamas' Atlantis Resort and Casino. Florida International University said in February 2011 that it would not suspend him on the basis of the pending rape charge.

The charges were dropped by the Bahamian attorney general on June 20, 2011, after evidence pointed to an elaborate plot by the father of one of the girls to extort money from the Atlantis. The Huffington Post reported that security camera footage did not support the women's version of events. Wittels' attorney said the accusations stemmed from an apparent attempt to extort money from the Atlantis resort.

== Professional career ==
After his junior year of college, he signed with the Cardinals on July 2, 2011, and began playing for the Batavia Muckdogs of the New York–Penn League. With them, Wittels finished the 2011 season hitting .262 with 8 doubles, a triple, and 13 RBI, and had a 14-game hitting streak (tied for 6th-longest in the league).

In 2012, Wittels played for the Batavia Muckdogs (NYPL; Low-A, Quad Cities River Bandits (Midwest League; Single-A), Springfield Cardinals (Texas League; Double-A), and Memphis Redbirds (Pacific Coast League; Triple-A), batting a combined .243. The Cardinals released him on October 9, 2012, but re-signed him the following February.
