= 2023 ESPY Awards =

Athletic awards show

- Date: July 12, 2023
- Location: Dolby Theatre, Los Angeles
- Country: United States

Television/radio coverage
- Network: ABC
- Runtime: 180 minutes

The 2023 ESPY Awards, the 31st annual ceremony of the ESPY Awards, was held on July 12, 2023, at the Dolby Theatre in Los Angeles, and broadcast by ABC.

== Ceremony information ==
For the first time, the ceremony forewent a single host due to the 2023 Writers Guild of America strike. Pat McAfee delivered an opening monologue, notably including a diss towards former ESPN personality Skip Bayless.

== Winners and Nominees ==
Best Athlete, Men's Sports: Patrick Mahomes – Kansas City Chiefs, NFL; Nikola Jokić – Denver Nuggets, NBA; Aaron Judge – New York Yankees, MLB; Lionel Messi – Argentina, AFA	Best Athlete, Women's Sports: Mikaela Shiffrin – Ski; Sophia Smith – Portland Thorns FC, NWSL; Iga Świątek – Tennis; A'ja Wilson – Las Vegas Aces, WNBA
Best Breakthrough Athlete: Angel Reese – LSU Women's Basketball; Caitlin Clark – Iowa Women's Basketball; Brock Purdy – San Francisco 49ers, NFL; Julio Rodríguez – Seattle Mariners, MLB	Best Comeback Athlete: Jamal Murray – Denver Nuggets, NBA; Jon Jones – UFC; Alyssa Thomas – Connecticut Sun, WNBA; Justin Verlander – New York Mets, Houston Astros, MLB
Best College Athlete, Men's Sports: Caleb Williams – USC Football; Duncan McGuire – Creighton soccer; Brennan O'Neill – Duke lacrosse; Zach Edey – Purdue Boilermakers basketball	Best College Athlete, Women's Sports: Caitlin Clark – Iowa women's basketball; Jordy Bahl – Oklahoma Sooners softball; Izzy Scane – Northwestern lacrosse; Trinity Thomas – Florida Gators gymnastics
Best Team: Kansas City Chiefs – NFL; Denver Nuggets – NBA; Georgia Bulldogs, NCAA Division I FBS; Las Vegas Aces – WNBA; Louisiana State Tigers – NCAA Women's Basketball; Oklahoma Sooners – Women's College World Series; Vegas Golden Knights – NHL	Best Championship Performance: Lionel Messi, Argentina – 2022 FIFA World Cup final; Leon Edwards – UFC 278; Nikola Jokić, Denver Nuggets – NBA Finals; Rose Zhang, LPGA
Best Athlete with a Disability: Zach Miller, Snowboarding; Erica McKee, Sled Hockey Team; Aaron Pike, Wheelchair racing & Cross-country skiing; Susannah Scaroni, Wheelchair racing	Best Play: Justin Jefferson with the Catch of the Century; Michael Block Hole-in-One!; Ally Lemos with the perfect corner to tie the National Championship game; Trinity Thomas Perfect 10 Tying the All-Time NCAA Record
Best Record-Breaking Performance: LeBron James surpasses Kareem Abdul-Jabbar for NBA career scoring record; Novak Djokovic breaks Rafael Nadal record for most Grand Slam titles (23); Mikaela Shiffrin breaks the record for the most World Cup victories with her 87th win; Max Verstappen wins the Mexican Grand Prix, breaking the record for most wins in a season	Best NFL Player: Patrick Mahomes – Kansas City Chiefs; Nick Bosa – San Francisco 49ers; Jalen Hurts – Philadelphia Eagles; Justin Jefferson – Minnesota Vikings
Best MLB Player: Shohei Ohtani – Los Angeles Angels; Paul Goldschmidt – St. Louis Cardinals; Aaron Judge – New York Yankees; Justin Verlander – Houston Astros	Best NHL Player: Connor McDavid – Edmonton Oilers; Jonathan Marchessault – Vegas Golden Knights; David Pastrňák – Boston Bruins; Linus Ullmark – Boston Bruins
Best NBA Player: Nikola Jokić – Denver Nuggets; Jimmy Butler – Miami Heat; Joel Embiid – Philadelphia 76ers; Jayson Tatum – Boston Celtics	Best WNBA Player: A'ja Wilson – Las Vegas Aces; Skylar Diggins-Smith – Phoenix Mercury; Candace Parker – Chicago Sky, Las Vegas Aces; Breanna Stewart – Seattle Storm, New York Liberty
Best Soccer Player: Lionel Messi – Argentina; Aitana Bonmatí – FC Barcelona Femení; Erling Haaland – Manchester City F.C.; Sophia Smith – Portland Thorns FC	Best Driver: Max Verstappen – Formula One; Brittany Force, NHRA; Kyle Larson, NASCAR; Josef Newgarden, IndyCar
Best Golfer: Scottie Scheffler; Wyndham Clark; Nelly Korda; Jon Rahm	Best Boxer: Claressa Shields; Gervonta Davis; Devin Haney; Shakur Stevenson
Best UFC Fighter: Jon Jones; Leon Edwards; Islam Makhachev; Amanda Nunes	Best Tennis Player: Novak Djokovic; Carlos Alcaraz; Aryna Sabalenka; Iga Świątek

== Honorary awards ==
Jimmy V Award

- Liam Hendriks

Arthur Ashe Courage Award

- United States women's national soccer team

Pat Tillman Award for Service

- Buffalo Bills training staff

Muhammad Ali Sports Humanitarian Award

- Jrue Holiday and Lauren Holiday
