= List of golf awards =

This is a list of golf awards.

== PGA Tour ==
Award	Year founded	Notes
PGA Player of the Year	1948	Selected using a points system with marks awarded for wins, money list position and scoring average.
PGA Tour Player of the Year	1990	Selected by the tour players by ballot. Also known as the Jack Nicklaus Trophy.
Rookie of the Year	1990	Players who are eligible are in their first season of PGA Tour membership.
Vardon Trophy	1937	Awarded (by the PGA of America) to leader in adjusted scoring average with a minimum of 60 rounds played.
Byron Nelson Award	1980	Awarded (by the PGA Tour) to leader in adjusted scoring average with a minimum of 50 rounds played.
Arnold Palmer Award	1981	Given to the player with the most money earned in a season.
Payne Stewart Award	2000	Given to the player whose "values align with the character, charity and sportsmanship that Stewart showed".
Comeback Player of the Year	1991	Players vote for the honoree.

== PGA Tour Champions ==
Award	Year founded	Notes
Jack Nicklaus Trophy	1990	Player of the Year, determined by vote of the players at season's end.
Arnold Palmer Award	1980	Given to the player with the most money earned in a season.
Charles Schwab Cup	2001	Points are earned for thousands of dollars earned in top-ten finishes at tournaments.
Rookie of the Year	1990	Players vote for the honoree.
Comeback Player of the Year	1991	Players vote for the honoree.
Byron Nelson Award	1980	Given to the golfer with the lowest scoring average of the season.

== European Tour ==
Award	Year founded	Notes
Harry Vardon Trophy	1937	Awarded to the leader of the Race to Dubai, previously known as the Order of Merit. This has largely been based on prize money since 1980, but has previously used a points system and stroke average at different times.
Sir Henry Cotton Rookie of the Year	1960	Selected by a panel comprising the PGA European Tour, the Royal and Ancient Golf Club of St.Andrews, and the Association of Golf Writers.
Seve Ballesteros Award	2008	Selected by a ballot of tour members. Founded as the European Tour's Players' Player of the Year Award, and renamed in honour of Ballesteros in 2017.

== United States Golf Association ==
- Bob Jones Award
- Joe Dey Award
- Herbert Warren Wind Book Award
- Green Section Award

== LPGA Tour ==
See: LPGA#LPGA Tour awards

== Intercollegiate golf ==
- Haskins Award
- Ben Hogan Award
- Edith Cummings Munson Golf Award
- Dinah Shore Trophy Award
- Jack Nicklaus Award - given to the best NCAA Division I golf player

== See also ==
- Claret Jug
- Wanamaker Trophy
