= USBWA Most Courageous Award =

College basketball award in United States

- Awarded for: A player, coach, official or administrator who has demonstrated extraordinary courage reflecting honor on the sport of amateur basketball.
- Country: United States
- Presented by: USBWA

History
- First award: 1978
- Most recent: Tyon Grant-Foster, Gonzaga (men); Rhet Wierzba, Indiana (women)
- Website: Perry Wallace Award (men); Pat Summitt Award (women)

The USBWA Most Courageous Awards are two annual basketball awards given by the U.S. Basketball Writers Association (USBWA) to a player, coach, official or administrator who have "demonstrated extraordinary courage reflecting honor on the sport of amateur basketball." Since 2012, the women's version of the award has been named the Pat Summitt Most Courageous Award in honor of the legendary Tennessee women's coach who received the award that year. Effective with the 2021 awards, the men's version became known as the Perry Wallace Most Courageous Award in honor of the Vanderbilt player who was the first African-American basketball player in the Southeastern Conference.

== History and selection ==
The award was first presented in 1978, and was not initially restricted exclusively to college basketball. Through 2009 a single award was presented, then starting in 2010 two separate awards have been given for men's and women's amateur basketball. More than one individual can receive an award, with the most recent example being in 2023, when the men's award was presented to players Terrence Hargrove of Saint Louis and Connor Odom of Utah State. Traditionally, the winners receive their awards at the men's or women's Final Four (as applicable), although the awards can be presented earlier as circumstances dictate. The most notable exception was when the 2015 Summitt Award was presented to Lauren Hill at halftime of her first college game in November 2014, presumably so she would receive the award while alive (at the time, she was not expected to survive until the 2015 Final Four).

Most honorees have been cited for courage as current or former college players. However, the list of recipients also includes coaches, the wife of a coach, two broadcasters, a referee, an athletic program staffer, the widow of a former player (recognized alongside her late husband), and five basketball programs. The award's bifurcation by sex or gender is not based on that of the recipient, but rather on whether the recipient was connected to the men's or women's game.

== Key ==
†	Multiple recipients in same season

== Winners ==
All affiliations listed were current at the time the award was presented. The "Notes" column indicates the situation that led the USBWA to present the award.

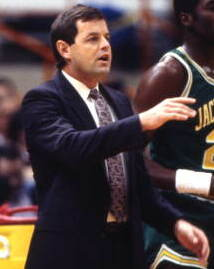
Bob Wenzel, Jacksonville, 1986

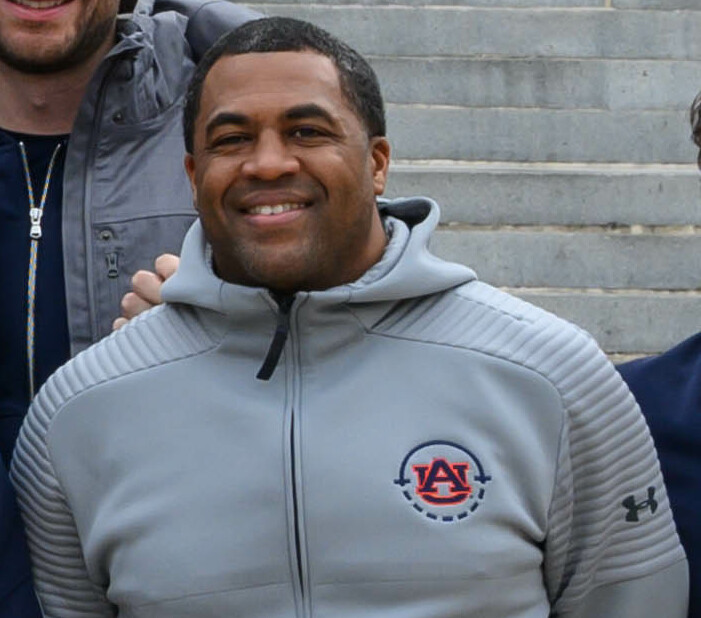
Wes Flanigan, Auburn, 1997

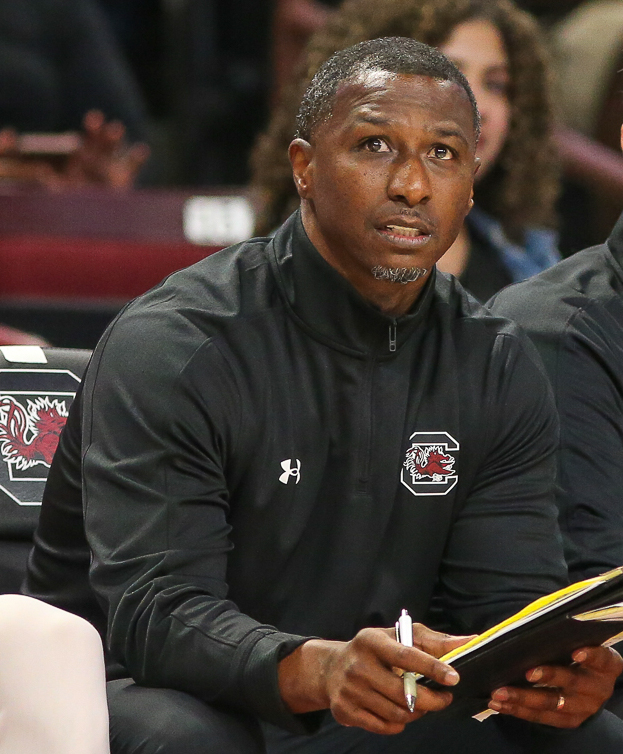
Eddie Shannon, Florida, 1999

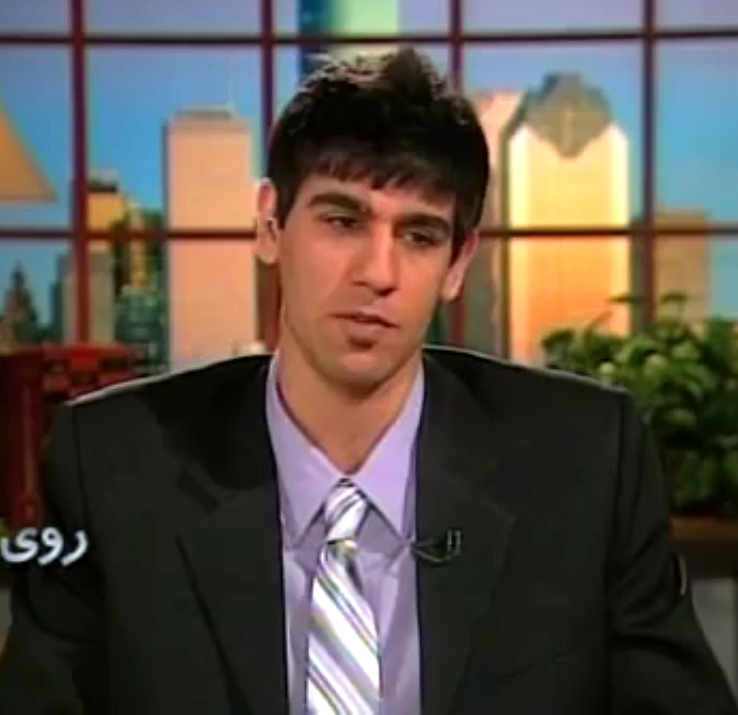
Arsalan Kazemi, Rice, 2011

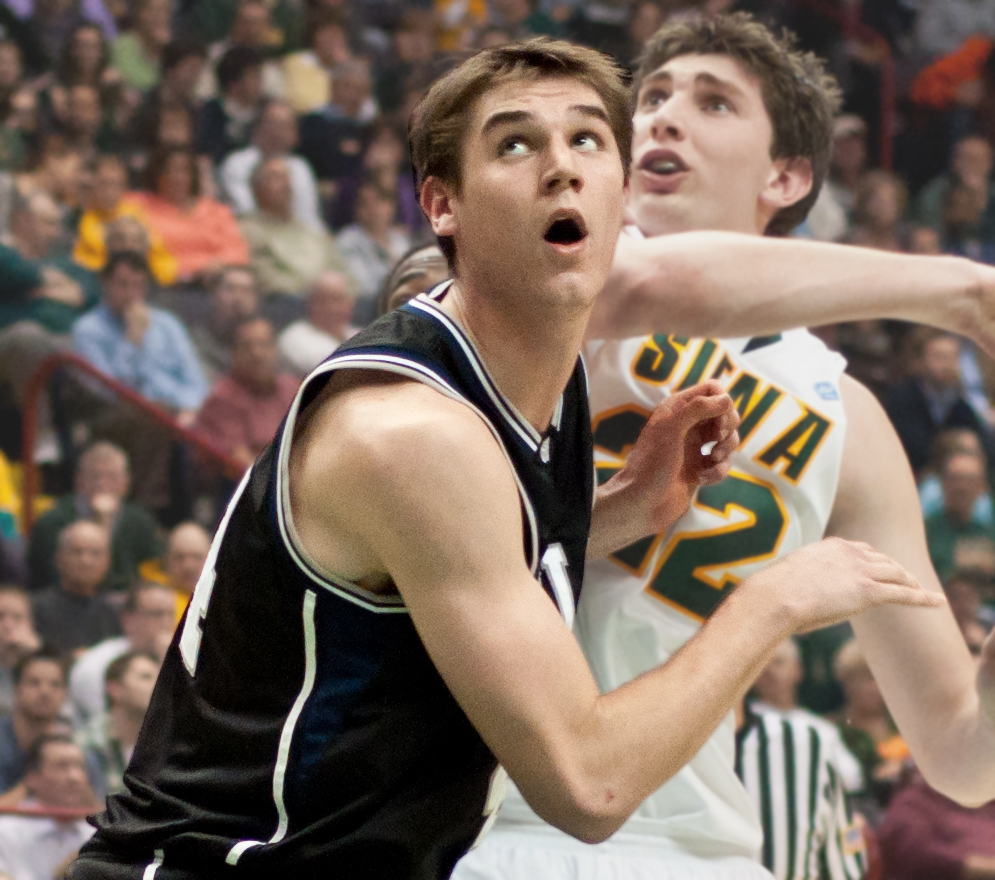
Andrew Smith, Butler, 2016

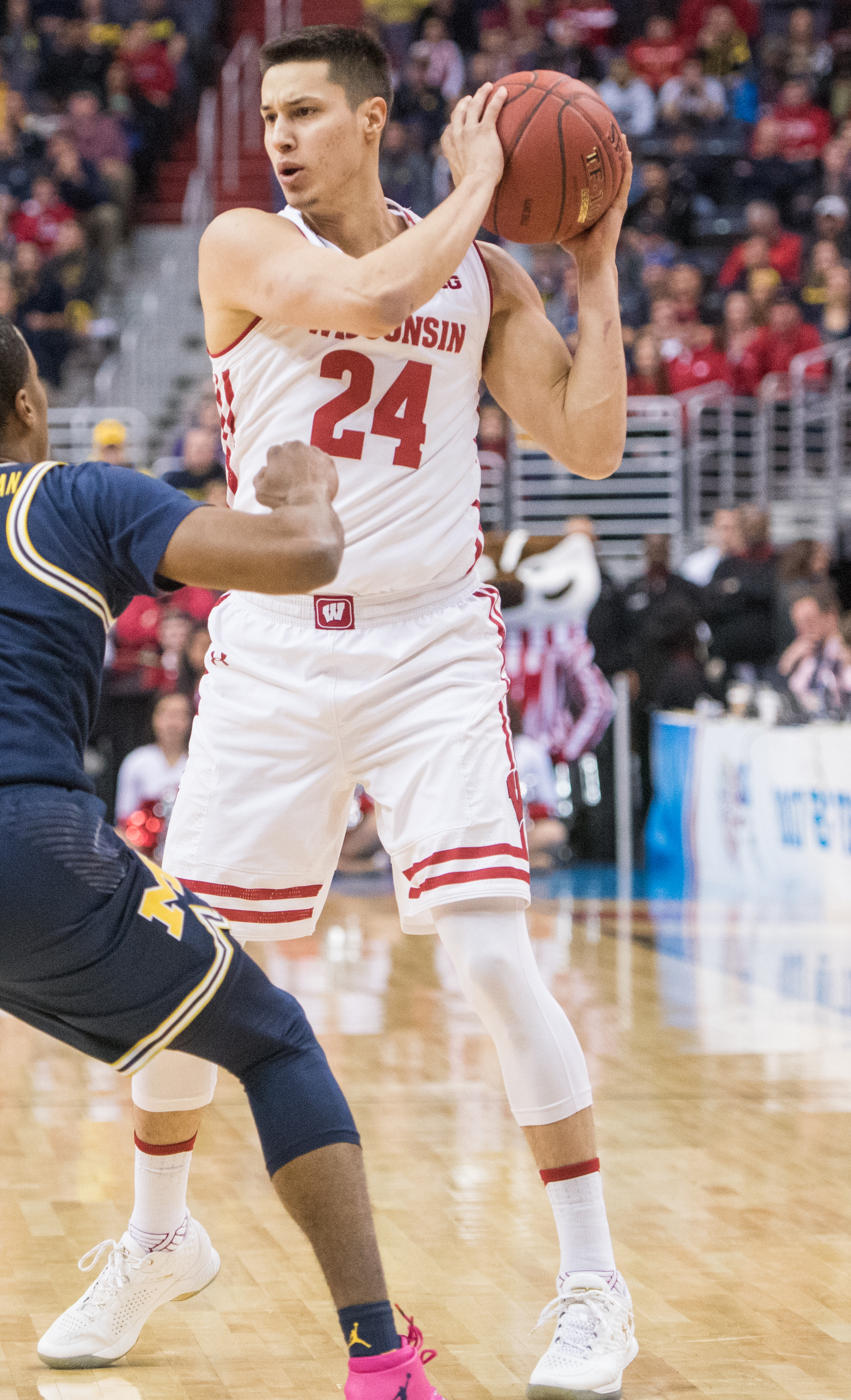
Bronson Koenig, Wisconsin, 2017

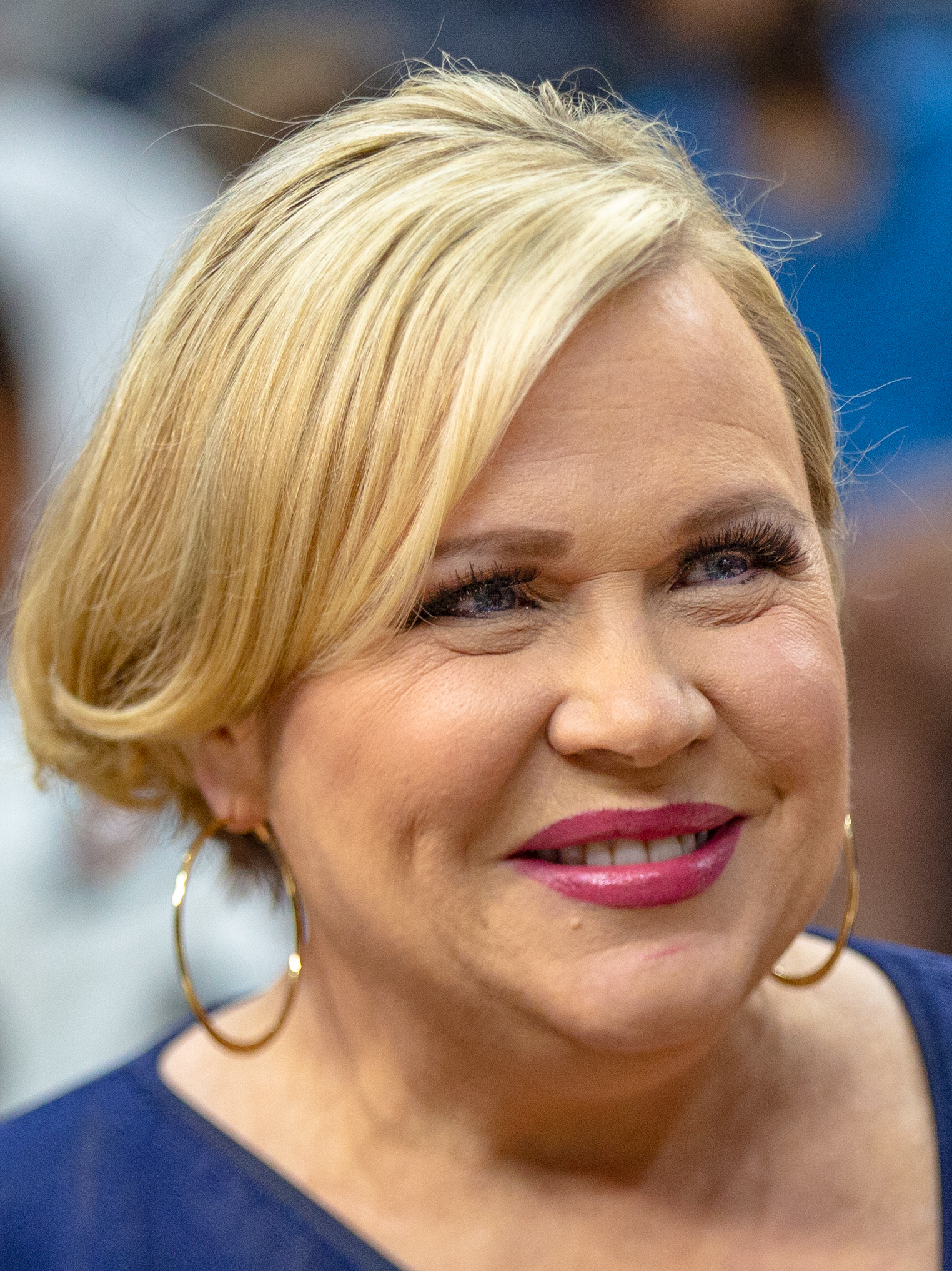
Holly Rowe, ESPN, 2017

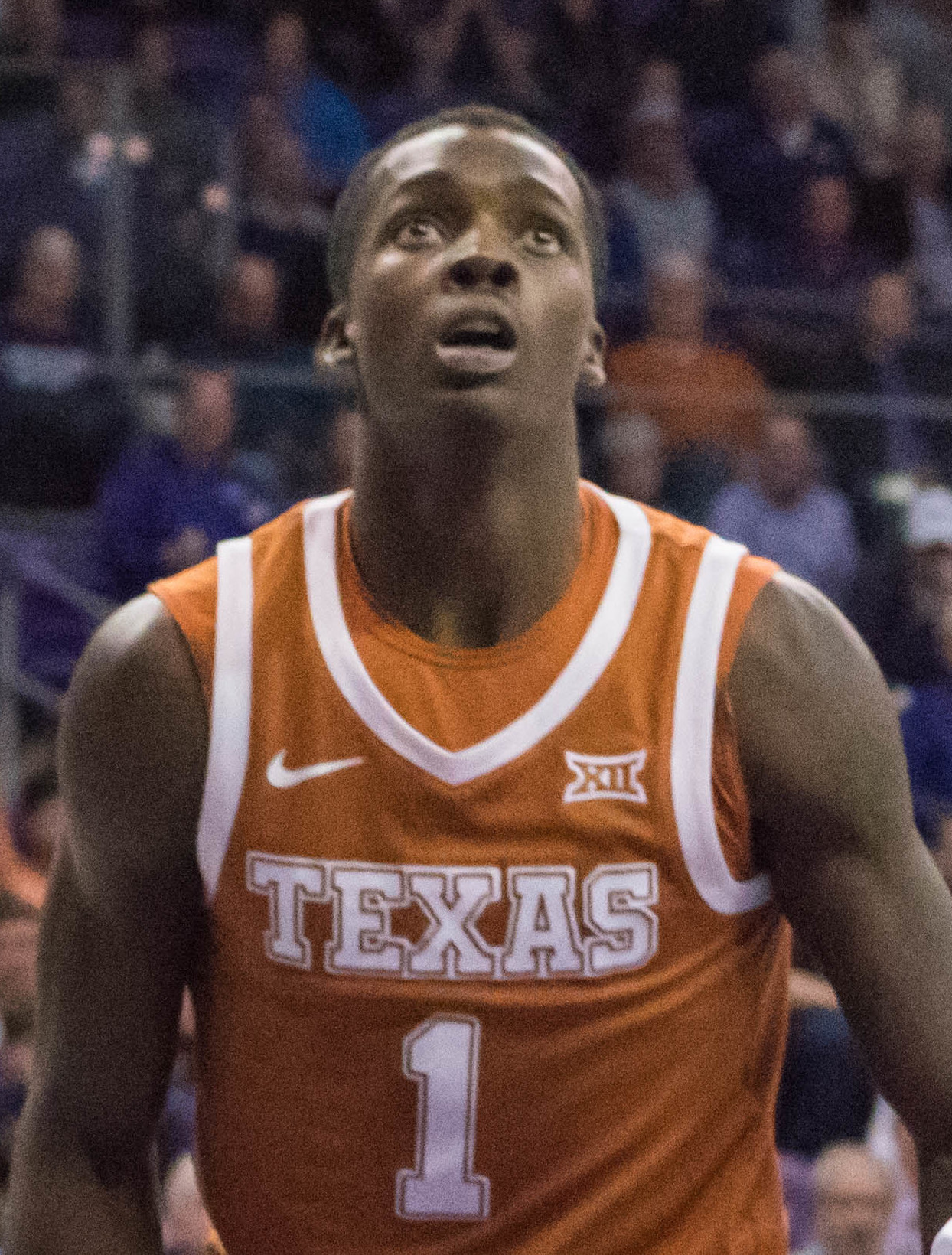
Andrew Jones, Texas, 2022

=== Single award (1978–2009) ===
All winners during this period were associated with men's basketball unless noted otherwise.

Season	Recipient(s)	Affiliation	Role	Notes	Reference
1977–78	John Kratzer	William & Mary	Player	Cancer patient	
1978–79	Bill Wanstrath	Batesville HS	Player	Played despite having only one arm	
1979–80	Phil Scaffidi	Niagara	Player	Cancer patient	
1980–81	Mark Alcorn	LSU	Player	Cancer patient	
1981–82	John Flowers	Bowling Green	Player	Overcame "tremendous personal and physical problems"	
1982–83	Ronnie Carr	Western Carolina	Player	Overcame serious complications of injuries in an auto accident	
1983–84	Reggie Warford	Pittsburgh	Assistant coach	Rescued an elderly couple from a home fire	
1984–85	Dennis Schlitt	Army	Player	Overcame a life-threatening illness	
1985–86	Bob Wenzel	Jacksonville	Head coach	Recovered from emergency brain aneurysm surgery	
1986–87	David Rivers	Notre Dame	Player	Recovered from serious injuries in an auto accident	
1987–88	Steve Kerr	Arizona	Player	Overcame the murder of his father during his college career	
1988–89	Landon Turner	Indiana	Former player	Played wheelchair basketball after being paralyzed in an auto accident	
1989–90	Donald Taylor	UMass	Player	Went from homelessness to a NCAA Division I scholarship	
1990–91	Eric Murdock	Providence	Player	Returned from an irregular heartbeat and many injuries	
1991–92	Pete Pavia	—	Referee	Officiated college games while battling cancer for 13 years	
1992–93	Jim Valvano	ESPN	Broadcaster / former coach	Battled bone cancer	
1993–94	Orlando Antigua	Pittsburgh	Player	Survived childhood in a difficult New York City neighborhood, including being shot in the head	
1994–95	Nolan Richardson	Arkansas	Head coach	Overcame racial prejudice and the cancer death of his daughter during his career	
1995–96	Cori Carson	Marymount (women's)	Player	Returned to play a year after receiving a liver transplant	
1996–97	Wes Flanigan	Auburn	Player	Recovered from surgery to remove a malignant tumor from his arm	
1997–98	Jacky Kaba	Seton Hall	Player	Went from war-torn Liberia to NCAA Division I basketball	
1998–99	Eddie Shannon	Florida	Player	Played despite having only one eye since a middle school accident	
1999–00	Nathan Binam	Oral Roberts	Player	Started despite losing the index finger of his shooting hand in an auto accident	
2000–01	Entire program	Oklahoma State	Program	Dealt with the aftermath of a plane crash that killed 10 team members	
2001–02	Jamel Bradley	South Carolina	Player	Played successfully despite 80% hearing loss	
2002–03	Rayna DuBose	Virginia Tech (women's)	Former player	Survived an infection that led to the amputation of parts of all four limbs after her freshman season	
2003–04	Trey Schwab	Marquette	Assistant coach	Coached despite suffering from a lung disease that eventually required a double lung transplant	
2004–05	Grant Dykstra	Western Washington	Player	Played successfully despite having full use of only one arm	
2005–06	Mike Sutton	Tennessee Tech	Head coach	Continued to coach despite Guillain–Barré syndrome	
2006–07	Entire program	Duquesne	Program	Dealt with the aftermath of a summer 2006 shooting that left five players injured	
2007–08	Josh Porter	LSU–Shreveport	Player	Returned from a major neck injury suffered during a November 2006 game	
2008–09	Kelvin Davis	San Diego State	Player	Played while undergoing treatment for Hodgkin lymphoma	

=== Men's award (2010–present) ===
Season	Recipient(s)	Affiliation	Role	Notes	Reference
2009–10	Dave Rose	BYU	Head coach	Returned from a battle with pancreatic cancer	
2010–11	Arsalan Kazemi	Rice	Player	First Iranian-born NCAA Division I player, despite often-troubled U.S.–Iran relations	
2011–12	Bernard James	Florida State	Player	Went from high school dropout to military veteran to NCAA Division I player	
2012–13	Dick Kelley	Boston College	Sports information director	Continued to work despite suffering from ALS	
2013–14^{†}	Dau Jok	Penn	Player	Went from war-torn South Sudan to the Ivy League	
2013–14^{†}	Dan Peters	Akron	Director of basketball operations	Worked while battling pancreatic cancer	
2014–15	Austin Hatch	Michigan	Player	Survivor of two plane crashes that killed the rest of his immediate family, the second of which left him in a coma for two months	
2015–16^{†}	Andrew Smith	Butler	Former player and his widow	Battled what proved to be fatal non-Hodgkin lymphoma and leukemia, and publicized need for bone marrow donors	
2015–16^{†}	Samantha Smith	Butler	Former player and his widow	Battled what proved to be fatal non-Hodgkin lymphoma and leukemia, and publicized need for bone marrow donors	
2016–17	Bronson Koenig	Wisconsin	Player	Social activism surrounding the Dakota Access Pipeline protests	
2017–18	Sam Dowd	Idaho State	Player	Left homeless at age 13 due to his parents' addictions; also one of the shortest NCAA Division I men's players at 5'7" (1.70 m)	
2018–19	Ericka Downey	Northeastern State	Wife of coach	Donated a kidney to former NCAA Division I men's coach Billy Gillispie, whom she had never met before the surgery	
2019–20	Sam Toney	New Jersey City	Player	Went from a childhood spent in roughly 50 foster homes to an NCAA Division III All-American	
2020–21	Bluefield Rams	Bluefield	Program	Protesting racial injustice, knelt before the national anthem before a game in defiance of orders from the college president	
2021–22^{†}	Justin Hardy	Washington University in St. Louis	Players	Both averaged double figures in scoring for their respective teams while battling cancer (stomach cancer for Hardy, leukemia for Jones)	
2021–22^{†}	Andrew Jones	Texas	Players	Both averaged double figures in scoring for their respective teams while battling cancer (stomach cancer for Hardy, leukemia for Jones)	
2022–23^{†}	Terrence Hargrove	Saint Louis	Players	Extensively advocated for players' mental health after personally experiencing mental health issues (depression for Hargrove, severe anxiety and OCD for Odom)	
2022–23^{†}	Connor Odom	Utah State	Players	Extensively advocated for players' mental health after personally experiencing mental health issues (depression for Hargrove, severe anxiety and OCD for Odom)	
2023–24	Jeremiah Armstead	Fisk	Player	Went from homelessness in high school to college basketball	
2024–25	Entire program (boys)	Palisades Charter HS	Program	Completed winning season while coping with the trauma of the January wildfires that destroyed much of their campus and left several players without their homes	
2025–26	Tyon Grant-Foster	Gonzaga	Player	Suffered a cardiac arrest in 2021 while playing for DePaul, spent 16 months out of the sport recovering, then won a lawsuit to allow his eligibility to be reinstated	

=== Women's award (2010–present) ===
Season	Recipient(s)	Affiliation	Role	Notes	Reference
2009–10	Tiffara Steward	Farmingdale State	Player	Believed to be the smallest college player ever at 4'6" (1.37 m); survived premature birth, blind in one eye, more than 50% hearing loss, severe scoliosis	
2010–11	Bilqis Abdul-Qaadir	Memphis	Player	Believed to be the first Division I women's player to wear Islamic coverings while playing	
2011–12	Pat Summitt	Tennessee	Head coach	Publicly announced her diagnosis with early-onset dementia, and continued to coach in the 2011–12 season	
2012–13	Beckie Francis	Oakland	Head coach	Publicly acknowledged being a victim of child sexual abuse by her father	
2013–14	Kirsten Moore	Westmont	Head coach	Dealt with the unexpected death of her husband shortly before giving birth	
2014–15	Lauren Hill	Mount St. Joseph	Player	Played while battling what proved to be a fatal brain tumor	
2015–16	Danielle O'Banion	Kent State	Head coach	Survivor of stage 2 lymphoma	
2016–17^{†}	Angel Elderkin	Appalachian State	Head coach	Continued to coach while undergoing treatment for stage 3 endometrial cancer	
2016–17^{†}	Holly Rowe	ESPN	Broadcaster	Continued to cover basketball while undergoing treatment for desmoplastic melanoma	
2017–18	Avery Marz	Saint Joseph's	Player	Sidelined two seasons after suffering a stroke as a freshman at Saint Joseph's in 2014; returned to active playing duty in 2017–18	
2018–19	David Six	Hampton	Head coach	Continued as head coach in 2018–19 despite suffering a stroke in the 2018 offseason	
2019–20^{†}	Lauren Cox	Baylor	Players	Sisters who played while dealing with type 1 diabetes, with the older Lauren playing at an All-American level	
2019–20^{†}	Whitney Cox	Lubbock Christian	Players	Sisters who played while dealing with type 1 diabetes, with the older Lauren playing at an All-American level	
2020–21	Tiana Mangakahia	Syracuse	Player	Defeated stage 2 breast cancer before returning to play for Syracuse	
2021–22	Kendall Currence	Northeastern	Player	First-team all-conference player despite having undergone more than a dozen surgeries for a cleft lip, cleft palate, and multiple heart issues	
2022–23	Angelique Francis	Little Rock	Player	Survived childhood physical abuse and multiple suicide attempts to establish a foundation that helps youth dealing with abuse	
2023–24	Joye Lee-McNelis	Southern Miss	Head coach	Continued as head coach despite a third diagnosis of lung cancer	
2024–25	Entire program (girls)	Palisades Charter HS	Program	Completed winning season while coping with the trauma of the January wildfires that destroyed much of their campus and left several players without their homes	
2025–26	Rhet Wierzba	Indiana	Assistant coach	Diagnosed with brain cancer in 2024	
