= Damphousse =

Damphousse is a surname. Notable people with the surname include:

- Jean Damphousse (born 1952), Canadian politician
- Jean-François Damphousse (born 1979), Canadian ice hockey player
- Kelly Damphousse (born c. 1962), Canadian-American academic administrator and sociologist
- Vincent Damphousse (born 1967), Canadian ice hockey player
