= 2015 ESPY Awards =

Athletic awards show

- Official ESPYs logo
- Date: July 15, 2015
- Location: Microsoft Theater, Los Angeles
- Country: United States
- Hosted by: Joel McHale

Television/radio coverage
- Network: ABC
- Runtime: 180 minutes
- Viewership: 7.7 million

The 2015 ESPY Awards was the annual ESPY Awards held annually with 32 awards in total being handed out, honoring the best in sports. They were presented on July 15, 2015 and hosted by actor and comedian Joel McHale from the Microsoft Theater in Downtown Los Angeles. For the first time in its 23-year history, the ceremony was broadcast on ABC.

== Winners and nominees ==
Winners are listed first and highlighted in boldface.

**Best Male Athlete**: **Stephen Curry – Golden State Warriors, NBA**; LeBron James – Cleveland Cavaliers, NBA; Aaron Rodgers – Green Bay Packers, NFL; J. J. Watt – Houston Texans, NFL	**Best Female Athlete**: **Ronda Rousey – MMA**; Breanna Stewart – UConn Huskies basketball; Lindsey Vonn – Skiing; Serena Williams – Tennis
**Best Championship Performance**: **LeBron James, Cleveland Cavaliers** – Record breaking performance during the 2015 NBA Finals; American Pharoah, Race horse – Won first Triple Crown since 1978; Madison Bumgarner, San Francisco Giants – 2014 World Series MVP; Lauren Haeger, Florida Gators softball – Most Outstanding Player of the 2015 Women's College World Series	**Best Breakthrough Athlete**: **Mo'ne Davis, Little League Baseball** – First girl to earn a win in the Little League World Series; Odell Beckham Jr., New York Giants – 2014 NFL Offensive Rookie of the Year; Cardale Jones, Ohio State Buckeyes football – Won the College Football Playoff National Championship in just his 3rd start as the Buckeyes quarterback; Jordan Spieth, PGA – Won the 2015 Masters and 2015 U.S. Open
**Best Record-Breaking Performance**: **Peyton Manning** – threw record 509th touchdown pass; Lauren Chamberlain – hit 91st home run in NCAA softball; Devin Hester – took punt in for 20th career NFL touchdown return; Klay Thompson – scored 37 points in a single quarter	**Best Upset**: **Ole Miss over Alabama – College football**; Georgia State over Baylor – NCAA men's basketball tournament; Kansas City Royals – won American League Pennant
**Best Game**: **Patriots vs. Seahawks – Super Bowl XLIX**; A's vs. Royals – 2014 American League Wild Card Game; Spurs vs. Clippers – Game 7, NBA Western Conference Quarterfinals	**Best Team**: **U.S. Women's National Soccer Team - FIFA**; New England Patriots - NFL; UConn Huskies - NCAA Women's Division I Basketball; Golden State Warriors - NBA; Chicago Blackhawks - NHL; Ohio State Buckeyes - FBS
**Best Coach/Manager**: **Steve Kerr - Golden State Warriors**; Geno Auriemma - UConn Huskies women's basketball; Bill Belichick - New England Patriots; Mike Krzyzewski - Duke Blue Devils men's basketball; Urban Meyer - Ohio State Buckeyes football	**Best Comeback Athlete**: **Rob Gronkowski - New England Patriots**; Alex Rodriguez - New York Yankees; Derrick Rose - Chicago Bulls; Lindsey Vonn - Skiing
**Best International Athlete**: **Lionel Messi - FC Barcelona/Argentina**; Novak Djokovic - Tennis; Lewis Hamilton - Formula One; Lydia Ko - LPGA; Cristiano Ronaldo - Real Madrid/Portugal	**Best NFL player**: **Aaron Rodgers, Green Bay Packers** - 2014 NFL Most Valuable Player; Tom Brady, New England Patriots - MVP of his 4th Super Bowl Championship; Antonio Brown, Pittsburgh Steelers - Led the league in receptions (129) and receiving yards (1,698); DeMarco Murray, Dallas Cowboys - The 2014 leading rusher (1,845 yards); J. J. Watt, Houston Texans - NFL Defensive Player of the Year
**Best MLB player**: **Mike Trout, Los Angeles Angels of Anaheim** - 2014 American League MVP; Clayton Kershaw, Los Angeles Dodgers - 2014 National League MVP and Cy Young Award winner; Madison Bumgarner, San Francisco Giants - 2014 World Series MVP; Corey Kluber, Cleveland Indians - won 2014 AL Cy Young Award; Giancarlo Stanton, Miami Marlins - One of the top hitters in the league	**Best NHL Player**: **Jonathan Toews, Chicago Blackhawks** - captain of the 2015 Stanley Cup champions; Carey Price, Montreal Canadiens - Winner of the 2014-15 Ted Lindsay (most outstanding player), Jennings (fewest goals allowed), Vezina (top goaltender) and Hart (most valuable player) trophies; Alexander Ovechkin, Washington Capitals - Winner of 2014-15 Maurice "Rocket" Richard Trophy (most goals); John Tavares, New York Islanders - runner up for the Art Ross Trophy; Duncan Keith, Chicago Blackhawks - Winner of the Conn Smythe Trophy and a 2015 Stanley Cup champion
**Best NBA player**: **Stephen Curry, Golden State Warriors** - 2015 NBA MVP; Anthony Davis, New Orleans Pelicans - Led NBA in blocks (200); James Harden, Houston Rockets - NBA MVP runner-up; LeBron James, Cleveland Cavaliers - Led the NBA Finals in points (35.8), rebounds (13.3), and assists (8.8); Russell Westbrook, Oklahoma City Thunder - NBA scoring champion (28.1 ppg)	**Best WNBA Player**: **Skylar Diggins, Tulsa Shock** - 2014 WNBA Most Improved Player; Brittney Griner, Phoenix Mercury - 2014 WNBA Defensive Player of the year; Maya Moore, Minnesota Lynx - 2014 WNBA MVP; Candace Parker, Los Angeles Sparks - 3rd in the league in scoring (19.4 ppg); Diana Taurasi, Phoenix Mercury - 2014 WNBA Finals MVP
**Best Driver**: **Kevin Harvick, NASCAR** - 2014 NASCAR Sprint Cup Champion; Erica Enders-Stevens, NHRA - Won the 2014 NHRA Pro Stock Championship; Lewis Hamilton, Formula One - 2014 Formula One World Champion; Juan Pablo Montoya, IndyCar - 2015 Indy 500 winner; Will Power, IndyCar - 2014 IndyCar Series Champion	**Best Fighter**: **Ronda Rousey, MMA** - Defended the UFC Women's Bantamweight Title with two record-speed wins; Donald Cerrone, MMA - Current 8-fight UFC winning streak is the longest in the lightweight division; Terence Crawford, Boxing - Current WBO Light Welterweight champion; Gennady Golovkin, Boxing - Improved record to 33-0 with 30 KOs; Floyd Mayweather Jr., Boxing - Defeated Manny Pacquiao in a unanimous decision to bring his record to 48-0
**Best Male Golfer**: **Jordan Spieth** - Won the 2015 Masters and 2015 US Open; Rory McIlroy - 2014 PGA Player of the year, 2014 PGA Tour Player of the Year, and winner of the 2014 British Open and the 2014 PGA Championship; Billy Horschel - 2014 FedEx Cup Champion	**Best Female Golfer**: **Lydia Ko** - 2014 LPGA Rookie of the Year; Stacy Lewis - 2014 LPGA Player of the Year; Inbee Park - Won the 2014 LPGA Championship
**Best Male Tennis Player**: **Novak Djokovic** - Won the 2015 Australian Open, the 2014 and 2015 Wimbledon Championships, and the 2014 ATP World Tour Finals and 2014 ATP Player of the Year; Marin Čilić - 2014 US Open Champion; Roger Federer - Joined Jimmy Connors and Ivan Lendl in the 1000-win club; Stan Wawrinka - 2015 French Open Champion	**Best Female Tennis Player**: **Serena Williams** - Won the 2014 US Open, 2015 Australian Open, 2015 French Open, and 2015 Wimbledon Championships; Simona Halep - Finished world #3 on 2014 WTA Tour and placed as runner-up in the 2014 WTA Tour Finals; Petra Kvitová - 2014 Wimbledon Champion; Maria Sharapova - Finished world #2 on 2014 WTA Tour
**Best Male College Athlete**: **Marcus Mariota, Oregon Ducks football** - 2014 Heisman Trophy winner; Jack Eichel, Boston University Terriers men's ice hockey - 2015 Hobey Baker Award winner for best men's college hockey player; Frank Kaminsky, Wisconsin Badgers men's basketball - 2015 Naismith Player of the Year and Wooden Award; Logan Stieber, Ohio State Buckeyes wrestling - Led Ohio State to their first-ever team National Title and 2015 NCAA tournament Most Outstanding Wrestler; Dansby Swanson, Vanderbilt Commodores baseball Led SEC in hits (91), runs scored (75), total bases (171), and doubles (23); #1 pick in 2015 MLB draft	**Best Female College Athlete**: **Missy Franklin, California Golden Bears swimming** - NCAA Champion in 200 IM, 200 Freestyle, and 200 Backstroke and 2015 NCAA Swimmer of the Year; Taylor Cummings, Maryland Terrapins women's lacrosse - Won her 2nd-straight Tewaaraton Award as the best player in women's college lacrosse; Lauren Haeger, Florida Gators softball - 2015 USA Softball National Collegiate Player of the Year; Micha Hancock, Penn State Nittany Lions volleyball - 2014 AVCA DI National Player of the Year; Breanna Stewart, UConn Huskies basketball - 2015 AP Player of the year and 2015 Naismith Player of the Year
**Best Male Action Sports Athlete**: **Ryan Dungey, Motocross** - Won 8 of 17 rounds on the 2015 AMA Supercross series, claiming the overall title by a large margin; Tucker Hibbert, SnoCross - Won 8th-straight X Games SnoCross gold, now the longest active streak at X Games; Nyjah Huston, Skateboarding - Decisively won 2015 X Games Skateboard Street gold; Mark McMorris, Snowboarding - Won 2015 X Games gold in both Slopestyle and Big Air; Josh Sheehan, Freestyle Motocross - Landed first-ever FMX triple backflip	**Best Female Action Sports Athlete**: **Kelly Clark, Snowboarding** - Won 5 of the 6 major women's halfpipe events in 2014-15, including silver at X Games Aspen 2015; Paige Alms, Surfing - Won the Women's Best Performance at the 2015 Big Wave Awards; Stephanie Gilmore, Surfing - Won another World Surf League title in 2014; Laia Sanz, Enduro/motorbike - Claimed her 4th Enduro X gold at X Games Austin 2015
**Best Jockey**: **Victor Espinoza** - Won the 2015 Triple Crown aboard American Pharoah — Kentucky Derby, Preakness Stakes, and Belmont Stakes; Javier Castellano - Won 2014 Eclipse Award for Outstanding Jockey of the year; Joel Rosario - In April 2015 he surpassed 2,000 career wins	**Best Bowler**: **Jason Belmonte** - 2014 PBA Player of the Year and won 2015 USBC Masters and PBA Tournament of Champions; Parker Bohn III - Won the 2015 PBA Players Championship; 5th on the all-time titles won list; Mike Fagan - Won the 2014 PBA World Championship
**Best Male Athlete with a Disability**: **Krige Schabort - Triathlon**; Joe Berenyi - Cycling; Josh Pauls - Sled Hockey; Mike Shea - Snowboarding; Andy Soule - Nordic Skiing	**Best Female Athlete with a Disability**: **Becca Meyers - Swimming**; Kendall Gretsch - Triathlon; Oksana Masters - Nordic Skiing; Tatyana McFadden - Track and Field; Greta Neimanas - Cycling
**Best MLS Player**: **Robbie Keane, LA Galaxy** - 2014 Major League Soccer MVP; Obafemi Martins, Seattle Sounders FC - 17 goals, 13 assists; Lee Nguyen, New England Revolution - 18 goals, 5 assists; Bradley Wright-Phillips, New York Red Bulls - 2014 MLS Golden Boot; 27 goals, 2 assists	

== Honorary awards ==
Arthur Ashe Courage Award

- Caitlyn Jenner

Jimmy V Perseverance Award

- Leah and Devon Still

Pat Tillman Award for Service

- Danielle Green

Best Moment

- Lauren Hill, specifically her first game in November 2014

Icon Award

- Derek Jeter

== Presenters ==
The following are a list of presenters in order of appearance:

- Kiefer Sutherland
- Rachel McAdams
- Richard Sherman
- Lindsey Vonn
- Halle Berry
- Robin Roberts
- Mike Epps
- Alex Morgan
- Stephen Curry
- J. J. Watt
- Britney Spears
- Ed Helms
- Danica Patrick
- LeBron James
- Ciara
- Andre Iguodala
- Ben Affleck
- Abby Wambach
- Jake Gyllenhaal
- Brett Favre
- Vince Vaughn

== In Memoriam ==
The In Memoriam was first presented by journalist Robin Roberts giving tribute to fellow sports broadcaster Stuart Scott followed by singer Nate Ruess singing his single Moment to a video montage and honoring the following:

- Lauren Hill
- Ernie Banks
- Rob Bironas
- Oscar Taveras
- Dean Smith
- Chuck Bednarik
- Garo Yepremian
- Steve Montador
- Steve Byrnes
- Ann Mara
- Jerry Tarkanian
- Charles Sifford
- Minnie Miñoso
- Jerome Kersey
- Jethro Pugh
- Bob St. Clair
- Frank Borghi
- Roy Tarpley
- Marques Haynes
- Bevo Francis
- Rhonda Glenn
- Viktor Tikonov
- Calvin Peete
- Frank Torre
- Jean Béliveau
- Fuzzy Thurston
- Marty Sheets
- Ed Sabol
- Anthony Mason
- Ken Stabler
- Ernie Terrell
- Jack Kraft
- Allie Sherman
- Bill Guthridge
- Hot Rod Hundley
- Stuart Scott
