= Diane Blair =

American political scientist

- Born: October 25, 1938; Washington, D.C.
- Died: June 26, 2000 (aged 61); Fayetteville, Arkansas
- Education: Cornell University; University of Arkansas
- Scientific career
- Fields: Political science

Diane Frances Divers Kincaid Blair (October 25, 1938—June 26, 2000) was an American political scientist who specialized in the politics and government of Arkansas as well as on women and politics. She was a professor of political science at the University of Arkansas from 1968 to 1997. She befriended Bill Clinton and Hillary Clinton shortly after their arrival in Fayetteville, and was appointed to several public service positions by a succession of governors of Arkansas, including Bill Clinton. Blair remained close to the Clintons throughout her life, including working as a researcher on both of Bill Clinton's presidential campaigns. As President, Bill Clinton appointed Blair to chair the Board of Directors of the Corporation for Public Broadcasting. The Diane D. Blair Center of Southern Politics and Society, at the University of Arkansas, was named after her.

== Early life and education ==
Blair was born on October 25, 1938, in Washington, D.C. She attended Cornell University, where she was a member of the Phi Beta Kappa honor society, and graduated in 1959. After graduating, she worked in Washington, D.C., including as legislative secretary and speechwriter for Senator Stuart Symington. In 1967, Blair completed an M.A. degree in political science at the University of Arkansas. In 1967, she became a lecturer at the University of Arkansas. She became an assistant professor there in 1979, and remained on the faculty until she retired in 1997.

== Career ==
In 1971, Arkansas Governor Dale Bumpers appointed Blair to chair the Governor's Commission on the Status of Women. In 1975, she debated for the adoption of the Equal Rights Amendment in front of the Arkansas General Assembly, against Phyllis Schlafly. In 1976, Arkansas Governor David Pryor appointed Blair to head a Commission on Public Employee Rights.

Blair specialized in the politics and government of the state of Arkansas, as well as in women and politics, and authored two scholarly books. In 1979 she published Silent Hattie Speaks: The Personal Journal of Senator Hattie Caraway. In 1988 Blair published Arkansas Politics and Government: Do the People Rule? For the book Arkansas politics and government, Blair won the 1991 Virginia Ledbetter Award, awarded for the best book on Arkansas history or culture.

Blair became close with Bill and Hillary Clinton when they moved to Arkansas, and in 1980 Bill Clinton appointed Blair to the Commission for the Arkansas Educational Television Network. Blair worked as a researcher on both the Bill Clinton 1992 presidential campaign and the Bill Clinton 1996 presidential campaign. As President, Bill Clinton appointed Blair to the Board of Directors of the Corporation for Public Broadcasting, and she served as the chair of the board.

Blair was twice selected by University of Arkansas students as Outstanding Faculty Member, and she won the J. William Fulbright College of Arts and Sciences Master Teacher Award. She was the first recipient of the Master Teacher Award. In 1998, Blair won the Outstanding Professional Achievement Award from the Midwest Women's Caucus for Political Science. In 2000, she was awarded an Honorary Doctor of Laws degree from the University of Arkansas. In 2019, Blair was named to the Arkansas Women's Hall of Fame.

Blair died in 2000. Also in 2000, with the support of President Clinton, funds were obtained from the U.S. Congress to create The Diane D. Blair Center of Southern Politics and Society at the University of Arkansas. The center director is Angie Maxwell, the Diane D. Blair Associate Professor of Southern Studies in the Political Science Department at the University of Arkansas. Political scientist Todd Shields is affiliated with the center.

== Selected works ==
- Silent Hattie Speaks: The Personal Journal of Senator Hattie Caraway (1979)
- Arkansas Politics and Government: Do the People Rule? (1988)

== Selected awards ==
- Virginia Ledbetter Award (1991)
- Outstanding Professional Achievement Award, Midwest Women's Caucus for Political Science (1998)
- Honorary Doctor of Laws, University of Arkansas (2000)
