= Beckie =

Beckie is a feminine given name and surname. Notable people with the name include:

== Given name ==
- Beckie Francis (born 1965), American basketball coach
- Beckie Middleton (born 1986), English international field hockey player
- Beckie Scott (born 1974), Canadian former cross-country skier

== Surname ==
- Drew Beckie, Canadian soccer player
- Janine Beckie, Canadian-American soccer player
