= 2014 Hiram vs. Mount St. Joseph women's basketball game =

Basketball game held in Ohio, U.S.

2014 Hiram vs. Mount St. Joseph Play for 22
Regular season game
Hiram Terriers	Mount St. Joseph Lions
(0–0)	(0–0)
55	66
Head coach: Emily Hays	Head coach: Dan Benjamin
	1st half	2nd half	Total
Hiram Terriers	25	30	55
Mount St. Joseph Lions	28	38	66
- Date: November 2, 2014
- Venue: Cintas Center, Cincinnati, Ohio
- Referees: Linda Miles, Matt Barker and John Herschberger
- Attendance: 10,250

United States TV coverage
- Network: Fox Sports Ohio / Fox College Sports
- Announcers: Brad Johansen and Betsy Ross

The 2014 Hiram vs. Mount St. Joseph women's basketball game, billed as Play for 22, was the first game of the 2014–15 NCAA basketball regular season. The Division III game between Hiram College and Mount St. Joseph University (MSJ) was originally intended to be played at the Hiram campus in Hiram, Ohio, on November 15, 2014. However, the game was moved to November 2 to accommodate Lauren Hill, a Mount St. Joseph freshman who had been diagnosed with terminal brain cancer and wished to play in one college game before her death. The game was also moved to Cincinnati, initially to the MSJ campus in nearby Delhi Township and ultimately to Cintas Center on the campus of Xavier University.

== Background ==
=== Lauren Hill ===
Lauren Hill (October 1, 1995 – April 10, 2015) was born in Greendale, Indiana. and been a star basketball player at Lawrenceburg High School in Lawrenceburg, Indiana, located about 30 miles (48 km) west of Cincinnati. On her 18th birthday in 2013, she committed to play at Mount St. Joseph. However, as she was preparing for her senior season at Lawrenceburg High, she was noticing problems with her game. As she would tell a reporter from WKRC-TV in Cincinnati in late 2014, "I wasn't keeping up with the other girls. My ball handling was sloppy so I just figured I was out of shape." After further problems in the following weeks, she thought that she had suffered a concussion, and her family took her to Cincinnati Children's Hospital Medical Center. On November 20, 2013, less than two months after committing to MSJ, she was diagnosed with diffuse intrinsic pontine glioma (DIPG), a rare type of brain cancer that normally affects children age 5 to 7. The cancer, which grows from the brain stem, is inoperable and is not considered survivable.

Initially, Hill was given a best-case prognosis of two years to live. Her father recalled that immediately after the diagnosis, "I got weak, [Lauren's mother] Lisa got sick, and typical Lauren she wanted to know if she could still play basketball." She indeed continued to play in her senior season at Lawrenceburg High despite undergoing regular chemotherapy and radiation treatments, and as scheduled came to MSJ for the 2014–15 season. In September 2014, she had an MRI that revealed that the tumor had grown; at that time, doctors told her and her family that she would probably die before the end of the year. Shortly after this diagnosis, she told new MSJ head coach Dan Benjamin, "One game. I want to play one college game." She also chose to spend her last months as an advocate for DIPG research, which had made little progress at the time.

=== Buildup ===
After this news, the MSJ athletic department approached its counterpart at Hiram. The two teams had initially planned to open their respective seasons on November 15 at Hiram's Price Gymnsaium, but Hiram agreed to move the game to November 1 at MSJ if the NCAA would give permission. This was needed because under NCAA rules, Division III schools cannot play regular-season games before November 15. The NCAA ultimately granted the schools a waiver to play on November 2.

The game was then scheduled to be held at the Mount St. Joseph campus. The school's arena, Harrington Center, has a capacity of 2,000, and the typical attendance for a women's basketball game is about 100. However, as news spread of Hill's story, the demand for tickets and media credentials was too great for MSJ to accommodate. At that time, Xavier University stepped in, offering MSJ free use of its arena, Cintas Center, with arena employees volunteering their time for the game. Even with the move to the 10,250-seat venue, the game sold out in 30 minutes. The interest in the game also led Fox Sports Ohio to televise it live.

The game would soon be billed as "Play for 22", after Hill's jersey number. The schools decided to turn the game into a charity fundraiser; Hill and her family chose The Cure Starts Now Foundation (TCSN), a charity devoted to DIPG research, as the beneficiary. The foundation would provide the funds from the event to Cincinnati Children's, where Hill had been undergoing treatment, which at the time was working on an international DIPG registry. The fundraising efforts went beyond game proceeds; MSJ invited NCAA member schools to donate a #22 jersey. Hill signed the donated jerseys, which would be auctioned off during the game and in the following days. She raised US$1 million for pediatric cancer research with a Cincinnati telethon for the foundation, which then donated $1 million to brain cancer research and continues to grow and donated over $4.7 million to medical research in 2015.

Hill and Benjamin also created a charity challenge, modeled after the ALS Ice Bucket Challenge, known as "Layup4Lauren". Because her cancer caused dizziness and weakened her normally dominant right hand, she was forced to shoot primarily with her left hand. The challenge involves spinning in a complete circle three times, and then making a layup with one's non-dominant hand.

== The game ==
The game itself followed the theme of brain cancer awareness. MSJ had special gray uniforms made for the game, but Benjamin did not tell Hill until the team was in the locker room. Gray is recognized as a color for brain cancer awareness (similar to pink for breast cancer), signifying gray matter. During pregame warmups, Hiram wore "Play for 22" T-shirts with "MSJ" on the front. Many local celebrities were in attendance, as were several national sports luminaries—among them Tennessee women's coach Pat Summitt, Buffalo Bills running back Fred Jackson, and WNBA stars Tamika Catchings, Elena Delle Donne, and Skylar Diggins.

Hill started the game, and after MSJ won the opening tip, they ran a play designed to get Hill a layup for the opening points of the game. The play had been practiced regularly, and the night before the game, MSJ's coaching staff had a dinner with their counterparts from Hiram at which both staffs discussed the play. Hill made the left-handed layup, and the game was immediately stopped. Both teams gave Hill a standing ovation, she was presented with the game ball, and was then helped to the bench by her father. Due to nausea caused by the medication she was taking to control some of the symptoms of her cancer, she spent most of the game on the bench.

During halftime, Hill was presented with the Pat Summitt Most Courageous Award, given by the United States Basketball Writers Association, by Summitt herself. The award was first presented in 1978, with separate men's and women's versions since 2010; the women's award has borne Summitt's name since 2012. The women's version is normally presented during the Women's Final Four, but the USBWA decided to hand out the award at the game, presumably so that Hill could receive it in person. Also during halftime, the NBA and WNBA teams that play in Hill's home state of Indiana, respectively the Indiana Pacers and Indiana Fever, jointly gave a $5,000 check to TCSN.

The game was closely fought until MSJ pulled away in the closing minutes. With the Lions having the ball with 30 seconds to play and a safe 9-point lead, Benjamin called a timeout and sent Hill back into the game. They ran another play for Hill, this time for a right-handed layup, but she missed. One of her teammates rebounded the ball and passed it back to her for a second right-handed layup, which she made to close out the scoring in the Lions' 66–55 win. After the game, MSJ announced that $40,000 had been raised for TCSN.

The attendance of 10,250 made the game the most-attended NCAA women's game in history that did not involve a Division I team. It more than doubled the previous Division III record of 4,395, set on January 7, 2009, by Calvin when it hosted Trine, and also exceeded the Division II record of 7,543 set by North Dakota State when it hosted North Dakota on February 23, 1996.

== Reactions ==
Hill's story resonated on social media, with basketball stars such as LeBron James and Candace Parker expressing their admiration for Hill's courage. Delle Donne said, "When I read Lauren's story and heard about the game, nothing could keep me away. It's incredible what she's doing and how many people she's reached. To be her age and have the kind of perspective to think beyond herself, she's amazing."

ESPN writer Alyssa Roenigk summed up the event:

If thoughts and emotions produce energy and that energy can alter an atmosphere, if the power of smiles and hugs and "good afternoons" and "be wells" can build and build until all that positivity overflows to change the molecules of air within a basketball arena, then that is what happened inside the Cintas Center on Sunday. The building overflowed with positive vibes, and that emotion was infectious. This day was not about basketball. It was not about a game. This was a celebration of life and a community coming together to support one girl and two teams as they banded together to beat up on cancer.

== Later developments and legacy ==
The initially announced fundraising total of $40,000 proved inaccurate. At a ceremony on November 19 at MSJ, Hill presented a check to TCSN for nearly $59,000, representing only proceeds from the "Play for 22" game. By that time, funds raised from the game and other initiatives involving Hill, such as the Layup4Lauren challenge and the jersey auction, totaled over $324,000. Her ultimate goal was to raise at least $1 million.

Hill remained in good enough health to travel with the team to its next two games on November 21 and 22 in a tournament hosted by Baldwin Wallace University, located near Cleveland. She played briefly in MSJ's tournament opener, a 69–64 loss to Bethany, scoring two points on a right-handed layup. Hill did not play in MSJ's second tournament game, a 77–68 win over Buffalo State. After her return from the tournament, she went to a Lawrenceburg High game on November 24 under the impression that she would only be supporting her alma mater. Instead, during a halftime ceremony, the school retired her #22, and the city's mayor announced a Lauren Hill Week.

After Hill played in four games and made five layups, Mount St. Joseph basketball coach Dan Benjamin announced that she would not play in future games but would like to stay on as an honorary coach. On January 7, 2015, Hill served as an assistant coach for the team.

Hill's family signed her up for hospice care on December 1, 2014. A recent cutback in her steroids dosage, combined with further growth of her tumor, led to more severe symptoms. Three days later, the V Foundation for Cancer Research, founded by late college coach and broadcaster Jim Valvano in 1993 during his own losing fight with cancer, donated $100,000 to TCSN during halftime of the Jimmy V Women's Classic game between Connecticut and Notre Dame. A statement from Hill, taped at her home, was shown during the presentation. Despite her advancing cancer, she was able to leave hospice care to play in a third game on December 13, the Lions' first game of the season at the Harrington Center against Franklin College. Hill started the game and scored the first two points before being substituted. Hill again started and scored the first basket in the Lions' next game on December 16 against Wooster; the following day, her family announced on Facebook that she had played her last game. At that time, Benjamin sent an email to multiple media outlets stating that Hill would remain on MSJ's bench as an honorary coach as long as her health permitted. On December 30, Hill's goal of raising $1 million for TCSN had been surpassed.

Fox Sports named Hill's first game as the top U.S. sports story of November 2014 in its end-of-year timeline, and the game was named "Best Moment" at the 2015 ESPY Awards.

Wheaties honored Hill with her picture on its cereal box.

On February 6, 2015, Hill was given an honorary Doctorate of Humane Letters degree by Mount St. Joseph University.

On March 4, 2015, she was named to the all-conference first team in the Heartland Collegiate Athletic Conference. "This award is being presented to Lauren in recognition of her courage and outstanding leadership", said conference commissioner Chris Ragsdale.

On April 5, 2015, she was given the Pat Summitt Courage Award.

Hill died on April 10, 2015, at Cincinnati Children's Hospital Medical Center. A public visitation and memorial service was held on April 13, 2015, at the Cintas Center with a private funeral and burial on April 15, 2015.

In June 2015, Hill was honored with a brick in the courtyard of the Indiana Basketball Hall of Fame; the brick is inscribed with her name and the word "Hero".

On July 15, 2015, Hill was honored with the "Best Moment" Award at the annual 2015 ESPY Awards. Her parents, Brent and Lisa Hill, accepted the award on her behalf.

On October 13, 2015, MSJ and Xavier announced the creation of the Lauren Hill Tipoff Classic, intended to be an annual season-opening basketball event. The inaugural event, held November 14, was preceded by the "2.2M for 22 in 22" telethon, which aired on three major Cincinnati TV stations for 22 hours. Before her death, Hill increased her fundraising goal to $2.2 million (matching her number), and the telethon was intended to complete this goal. Immediately after the end of the telethon, a women's basketball doubleheader followed at Cintas Center. The opener saw Xavier defeat Evansville 65–57, followed by Hiram defeating MSJ 70–63. All paid spectators at the doubleheader received a bobblehead of Hill scoring her first layup; a total of 5,000 were intended to be given away, but attendance was only 3,122.

On June 11, 2016, Hill received the first "For the Love of the Game" award presented by the Women's Basketball Hall of Fame. This award is presented for showing outstanding courage and inspiration. Her college coach at Mount St. Josephs, Dan Benjamin received the award during the WBHOF Induction Ceremony in Knoxville, TN.

Hill's legacy was again remembered at the ceremony for the 2018 Summitt Award. Avery Marz, who had planned to start play at Saint Joseph's in 2014, suffered a stroke while moving into her dormitory room that August. One doctor who treated her told her she would never play again. After one of her rehab sessions, Marz returned home to watch coverage of the Hiram–MSJ game, including the Summitt Award ceremony. She eventually returned to the court for Saint Joseph's in 2017–18, and received the award in March 2018 with Hill's parents and Summitt's son Tyler in attendance. While accepting her award, Marz remarked, "I had time on my side, and she knew she did not. I knew if I was able to find just half the courage Lauren had, I'd be able to get back on the court." Hill's mother likened Marz to her daughter, telling the Associated Press, "I see of lot of her there. The tenacity and the drive to keep moving forward, to get herself back on the court -- that's exactly what Lauren did."
