= Best Moment ESPY Award =

Annual athletic award

The Best Moment ESPY Award has been conferred annually since 2001 on the moment or series of moments transpiring in a play in a single game or individual match or event, across a single regular season or playoff game, or across a season, irrespective of specific sport, contested, in all cases, professionally under the auspices from one of the four major leagues in the united States and Canada, collegiately under the auspices of the National Collegiate Athletic Association, or internationally under the auspices of a sport federation, adjudged to the most remarkable or best in a given calendar year; the primary participant in the moment is generally regarded as the award's recipient.

Between 2001 and 2004, the award voting panel comprised variously fans; sportswriters and broadcasters, sports executives, and retired sportspersons, termed collectively experts; and ESPN personalities, but balloting thereafter has been exclusively by fans over the Internet from amongst choices selected by the ESPN Select Nominating Committee. In 2001, the ESPY Awards ceremony was conducted in February and awards conferred reflected performance and achievement over the twelve months previous to presentation; since 2002, awards have been presented in July to reflect performance and achievement also over a twelve-month period. There was no voting in 2015, 2016, and 2017, but the 2018 winner was determined by voting. There was no voting in 2019.

== List of winners ==
Year of award	Game or event	Date	Competition, governing body, or league	Sport	Location	Moment
2002	2001 MLB season regular season game between the San Francisco Giants and Los Angeles Dodgers	6 October 2001	Major League Baseball (MLB)	Baseball	Pacific Bell Park San Francisco, United States	San Francisco Giants left fielder Barry Bonds hits his 71st home run of the 2001 MLB season to break Mark McGwire's single-season home run record.
2003	2002 US Open men's singles championship	8 September 2002	ATP Tour	Tennis	Arthur Ashe Stadium New York City, United States	American Pete Sampras, seeded seventeenth, defeats countrymate Andre Agassi, 6–3, 6–4, 5–7, 6–4, to capture his fourteenth career Grand Slam singles title
2004	Monday Night Football game in the penultimate week of the 2003 NFL season regular season between the Green Bay Packers and Oakland Raiders	22 December 2003	National Football League (NFL)	American football	Network Associates Coliseum Oakland, California, United States	Packers quarterback Brett Favre completes 22 of 30 passes attempted for 399 yards and four touchdowns to post a 154.86 quarterback rating one day after the death of his father
2005	Game six of a conference semifinal between the Detroit Pistons and Indiana Pacers in the 2005 NBA Playoffs	19 May 2005	National Basketball Association (NBA)	Basketball	Conseco Fieldhouse Indianapolis, United States	Pacers shooting guard Reggie Miller converts seven two-point and four three-point field goals and one free throw to score 27 points and to post a 68.8 per cent shooting percentage in the final game of his eighteen-season NBA career and receives an extended ovation when Pistons head coach Larry Brown calls a timeout in order that his team might also applaud Miller
2006	Regular season high school game between the Greece Athena High School Trojans and the Spencerport High School Rangers	16 February 2006	New York State Public High School Athletic Association	Basketball	Greece Athena High School Rochester, New York, United States	Trojans manager Jason McElwain, an autistic senior, is inserted by coach Jim Johnson into the Trojans' final regular season home game and, having shot an air ball and missed a layup, successfully converts one two-point and six three-point field goals to score twenty points across the game's final four minutes
2007	2006 Atlanta Falcons–New Orleans Saints game	25 September 2006	National Football League (NFL)	American football	Louisiana Superdome New Orleans, United States	The Saints, in their first game in New Orleans and at the Superdome since the structure was damaged by Hurricane Katrina in August 2005 and since it underwent a US$185 million renovation, defeat the Falcons 23–3 in a nationally televised game that earns the second-largest-ever cable television audience
2008	College softball game in the Great Northwest Athletic Conference between the Central Washington University Wildcats and the Western Oregon University Wolves	26 April 2008	National Collegiate Athletic Association (NCAA) Division II	Softball	Central Washington University Ellensburg, Washington, United States	After Wolves right fielder Sara Tucholsky hits her first career home run in a conference tournament doubleheader but tears her anterior cruciate ligament rounding first base, Wildcats first baseman Mallory Holtman and shortstop Liz Wallace carry Tucholsky around the bases lest her home run should be disallowed upon her receiving assistance from a teammate
2009	The Men's 4 × 100 metre freestyle relay event at the 2008 Summer Olympics.	11 August 2008	International Olympic Committee (IOC)	Swimming	Beijing National Aquatics Centre Beijing, China	Michael Phelps, Garrett Weber-Gale, Cullen Jones and Jason Lezak squeak out a come-from-behind victory in what would be Phelps' second of a record-breaking 8 gold medals at a single Olympics.
2010	Match at the 2010 FIFA World Cup between the US men's national soccer team and the Algeria men's national soccer team	23 June 2010	FIFA	Soccer	Loftus Versfeld Stadium Pretoria, Gauteng, South Africa	Landon Donovan scored in added time to give the US a 1–0 victory over Algeria, which put the US in the second round of the World Cup.
2011	Game 1 of the 2010 National League Division Series between the Cincinnati Reds and Philadelphia Phillies	October 6, 2010	Major League Baseball (MLB)	Baseball	Citizens Bank Park Philadelphia	Roy Halladay threw the first no-hitter in the MLB postseason since Don Larsen's perfect game in the 1956 World Series.
2012	Divisional Round game of the 2011–12 NFL playoffs between the Pittsburgh Steelers and the Denver Broncos	January 8, 2012	National Football League (NFL)	American football	Sports Authority Field at Mile High Denver, Colorado	Tim Tebow threw an 80-yard touchdown pass on the first play of overtime, leading the Broncos to a 29–23 upset victory over the Pittsburgh Steelers. The play beat out Derek Jeter's 3000th hit, the Tampa Bay Rays' walk-off win on the final day of the MLB regular season that sent them to the playoffs, and Bubba Watson's win at The Masters.
2013	Spring football game at the University of Nebraska–Lincoln	April 6, 2013	NCAA	American football	Memorial Stadium Lincoln, Nebraska	Jack Hoffman, a seven-year-old Nebraska fan suffering from brain cancer, is given the ball in the third quarter of the Red and White spring football game. He runs the ball 69 yards for a touchdown.
2014	The U.S. men's soccer team defeating Ghana 2–1 in its opening game of the 2014 FIFA World Cup.	June 16, 2014	FIFA	Soccer	Arena das Dunas Natal, Brazil	After Ghana tied the game, 21-year-old defender John Brooks headed in a goal off a Graham Zusi corner kick in the 86th minute for the game-winning goal.
2015	Regular-season women's basketball game between the Hiram College Terriers and Mount St. Joseph University Lions	November 2, 2014	NCAA Division III	Basketball	Cintas Center Cincinnati, Ohio	Lauren Hill, a Mount St. Joseph freshman battling an inoperable brain tumor that would claim her life five months later, scores the first and last baskets in what became the most-attended Division III women's game in history.
2016	2016 NBA Finals	June 2–19, 2016	NBA	Basketball	Quicken Loans Arena Cleveland, Ohio Oracle Arena Oakland, California	The Cleveland Cavaliers, behind 3–1 to the Golden State Warriors, who had won a record 73 games in the 2015–16 season, come back to win the championship. It was the first title Cleveland had won in a major sport since the 1964 Cleveland Browns.
2017	2016 World Series	October 25 – November 2, 2016	Major League Baseball	Baseball	Wrigley Field Chicago Progressive Field Cleveland, Ohio	The Chicago Cubs, behind 3–1 to the Cleveland Indians, rallied to win the World Series with by winning Games 5, 6 and 7, capping the comeback with an 8–7 10-inning win in Game 7. It was the Cubs' first World Series since 1908.
2018	2017-18 NFL playoffs	January 14, 2018	National Football League	American football	U.S. Bank Stadium Minneapolis, Minnesota	Vikings quarterback Case Keenum threw a 61-yard TD pass to Stefon Diggs on the game's last play to give the Vikings a 29–24 come-from-behind victory over the Saints. The play came to be known as the Minneapolis Miracle.
2019	Not applicable	Not applicable	National Football League, FIS, National Basketball Association	American football, Alpine skiing, basketball		Instead of a play or a game, Rob Gronkowski, Lindsey Vonn and Dwyane Wade—who announced their retirements in 2019—were honored for their achievements during their careers.
