= Paula González =

American ecologist

Sister Paula González, S.C., Ph.D., (October 25, 1932 - July 31, 2016) entered the Sisters of Charity of Cincinnati in 1954. She earned her doctorate in biology at the Catholic University in Washington, DC, and was a biology professor at the College of Mount St. Joseph in Cincinnati, Ohio, for 21 years.

Since 1972, Sister Paula has been freelancing as a futurist and environmentalist, working for more than three decades to promote sustainable living. She supported the work of the Alternate Energy Association of Southwestern Ohio, including serving as president for a while. She has developed audiotape courses in Earth-healing; has written several articles and book chapters on ecospirituality, conservation, renewable energy, and spiritual ecology; and has reached thousands in person by giving over 1800 presentations.

Sister Paula designed and did much of the work of converting a former chicken barn into "La Casa del Sol," a 1,200 sq ft (110 m^{2}) super-insulated, passive-solar house she shares with another Sister of Charity. When the temperature dropped below zero in the winter of 1985, the home temperature dropped to no lower than 50 degrees without any heater running. Sister Paula's success with solar energy earned her the nickname "Solar Nun."

Sister Paula founded EarthConnection, an environmental learning center where tours, internships, and environmental educational programs have been conducted. Located on the grounds of her congregation’s motherhouse, the EarthConnection Center was completed in 1995 and continues to showcase various renewable-energy technologies including daylighting, passive and active solar thermal, grid-tied photovoltaic, and geoexchange energy systems. The systems are not only impressive in their variety, but also notable for the unusual "solar-assisted geothermal" configuration, where summer heat is transferred from solar thermal collectors to an insulated bed of earth around the building for use the following winter. In addition to its technological innovations, EarthConnection has served as an educational hub for environmental advocacy, hosting workshops and programs aimed at promoting sustainable living and ecological responsibility. Sister Paula was known for engaging faith communities in climate activism, emphasizing the spiritual and ethical dimensions of environmental stewardship.

The American Solar Energy Society's Ohio Chapter, Green Energy Ohio, gave Sister Paula their Lifetime Achievement Award in 2005.

In 2007, Sister Paula and Keith Mills founded Ohio Interfaith Power and Light, a coalition of religious people responding to the climate-change crisis. Ohio Interfaith Power and Light is an affiliate of The Regeneration Project's national Interfaith Power and Light campaign, which has programs in 26 states involving over 4000 congregations (as of May 2008).

== Works ==
Book Chapters, etc.

- In "Medical-Surgical Nursing by Shafer et al.", Ecology and Health, St. Louis: Mosby, 1975.
- "Study Guide to Accompany Textbook of Anatomy and Physiology", Reith, Breidenbach, Lorenc, New York: McGraw-Hill, 1978.
- In "The Future of Global Nuclearization", Global Nuclearization: Some Alternative Futures, New York:Joint Strategy and Action Committee, Inc., 1985.
- In "Embracing Earth: Catholic Approaches to Ecology", An Eco-prophetic Parish?, A.J. LaChance and J.E. Carroll, eds., Maryknoll, NY: 1994.
- In "Ecology and Religion: Scientists Speak", Learning from the Earth: Key to Sustainable Development, J.E. Carroll and K.E. Warner, eds., Quincy IL: Franciscan Press, 1998.
- In "Earth at Risk: An Environmental Dialogue between Religion and Science", Developing an Ethic for Sustainable Community, D.B. Conroy and R.L. Petersen, New York: Humanity Books, 2000.

Audiotape Programs

- "Healing the Earth: An Emerging Spirituality", (12-session minicourse), Cincinnati, OH: St. Anthony Messenger Press, 1991.
- "What on Earth Are We Doing?" (5 hours), Kansas City, MO: Credence Cassettes, 1994.

Videotape Programs

- "Reading the Signs of the Times: Justice, Ecology and Christian Life", (2 hours), Laurel MD: Earth Communications, 1995.
- In "The Great Chain of Being: Simplifying Our Lives", Awakening to the Sacred (1 hr) and Toward a Sustainable Future (1 hr), Albuquerque, NM: Center for Action and Contemplation Summer Conference, 2007.

Journal/Magazine Articles (Selection)

- In "Momentum" (NCEA Journal),"New “3Rs” for the Teacher of the 1990s", December, 1986.
- In "InFormation", "Moving into the New Millennium: Challenges for Religious", March, April, 1998.
- In "Occasional Papers" (Leadership Conference of Women Religious), "Befriending Change", April, 1999.
- In "Radical Grace" (Center for Action and Contemplation), "Every Day Should Be ‘Earth Day’", April–June, 2001.
- In "Earthlight" (Journal for Ecological and Spiritual Living), "Living in a Eucharistic Universe", Spring, 2004.
- In "Preach", "Called to Tend the Sacred", Sept/Oct, 2004.
- In "Earthlight", "Toward A New Monasticism" Spring, 2005.
- In "Radical Grace", "Tis The Gift to Be Simple", Spring, 2007.
- In "St. Anthony Messenger", "The Our Father: Our Environmental Prayer", Oct, 2007.
