= Lauren Hill (basketball) =

American college basketball player (1995–2015)

Personal information
- Born: October 1, 1995 Greendale, Indiana, U.S.
- Died: April 10, 2015 (aged 19) Cincinnati, Ohio, U.S.
- Listed height: 5 ft 11 in (1.80 m)

Career information
- High school: Lawrenceburg (Lawrenceburg, Indiana)
- College: Mount St. Joseph (2014)
- Position: Forward
- Number: 22

Career highlights
- First-team All-HCAC (2015); Pat Summitt Most Courageous Award (2015); NCAA Inspiration Award (2016); No. 22 retired by Mount St. Joseph Lions

Lauren Elizabeth Hill (October 1, 1995 – April 10, 2015) was an American college basketball player. She gained national attention while battling terminal brain cancer during her freshman year at Mount St. Joseph University in Cincinnati. She was runner-up for 2014 Associated Press Female Athlete of the Year, coming second in voting to Mo'ne Davis.

In November 2014, the university retired Hill's number 22 in honor of "her inspirational fight to continue playing in the face of inoperable cancer".

== Biography ==
Hill was born in Greendale, Indiana. Her battle with cancer became public when the NCAA agreed to allow Mount St. Joseph to play Hiram College on November 2, 2014, thirteen days prior to the original game date of November 15, 2014, so Hill could play. The game was billed as "Play for 22", after Hill's jersey number. The location of the game was also originally moved from Hiram's Price Gymnasium to Mount St. Joseph's Harrington Center so that Hill would not have to travel the over 300 miles from Cincinnati to Hiram. However, due to public interest in the game, it was later moved from the 2,000 seat Harrington Center to the 10,250 seat Cintas Center on the campus of Xavier University. She raised US$1 million for pediatric cancer research with a Cincinnati telethon for The Cure Starts Now Foundation. The Foundation then donated $1 million to brain cancer research and continues to grow and donated over $4.7 million to medical research in 2015.

Hill's family signed her up for hospice care on December 1, 2014.

After Hill played in four games and made five layups, Mount St. Joseph basketball coach Dan Benjamin announced that she would not play in future games but would like to stay on as an honorary coach. On January 7, 2015, Hill served as an assistant coach for the team.

Wheaties honored Hill with her picture on its cereal box.

On February 6, 2015, Hill was given an honorary Doctorate of Humane Letters degree by Mount St. Joseph University.

On March 4, 2015, she was named to the all-conference first team in the Heartland Collegiate Athletic Conference. "This award is being presented to Lauren in recognition of her courage and outstanding leadership", said conference commissioner Chris Ragsdale.

On April 5, 2015, she was given the Pat Summitt Most Courageous Award.

== Death ==
Hill died on April 10, 2015, at Cincinnati Children's Hospital Medical Center. A public visitation and memorial service was held on April 13, at the Cintas Center with a private funeral and burial on April 15.

== Legacy ==
In June 2015, Hill was honored with a brick in the courtyard of the Indiana Basketball Hall of Fame; the brick is inscribed with her name and the word "Hero".

On July 15, 2015, Hill was honored with the "Best Moment" Award at the annual 2015 ESPY Awards. Her parents, Brent and Lisa Hill, accepted the award on her behalf.

On June 11, 2016, Hill received the first "For the Love of the Game" award presented by the Women's Basketball Hall of Fame. This award is presented for showing outstanding courage and inspiration. Her college coach at Mount St. Josephs, Dan Benjamin received the award during the WBHOF Induction Ceremony in Knoxville, TN.

In May 2019, Hill was posthumously inducted into the Ohio Basketball Hall of Fame.

By 2023, her The Cure Starts Now donation page had raised $2.6 million for DIPG research.

== Statistics ==
=== College statistics ===
Legend
GP	Games played	GS	Games started	MPG	Minutes per game
FG%	Field goal percentage	3P%	3-point field goal percentage	FT%	Free throw percentage
RPG	Rebounds per game	APG	Assists per game	SPG	Steals per game
BPG	Blocks per game	PPG	Points per game	**Bold**	Career high

Year	Team	GP	GS	FG%	3P%	FT%	RPG	APG	SPG	BPG	PPG
2014–15	St. Joseph	4	3	62.5%	0.0%	0.0%	0.3	0.0	0.0	0.0	2.5

== See also ==
- 2014 Hiram vs. Mount St. Joseph women's basketball game featuring Lauren Hill
