= Denise Trauth =

Denise M. Trauth
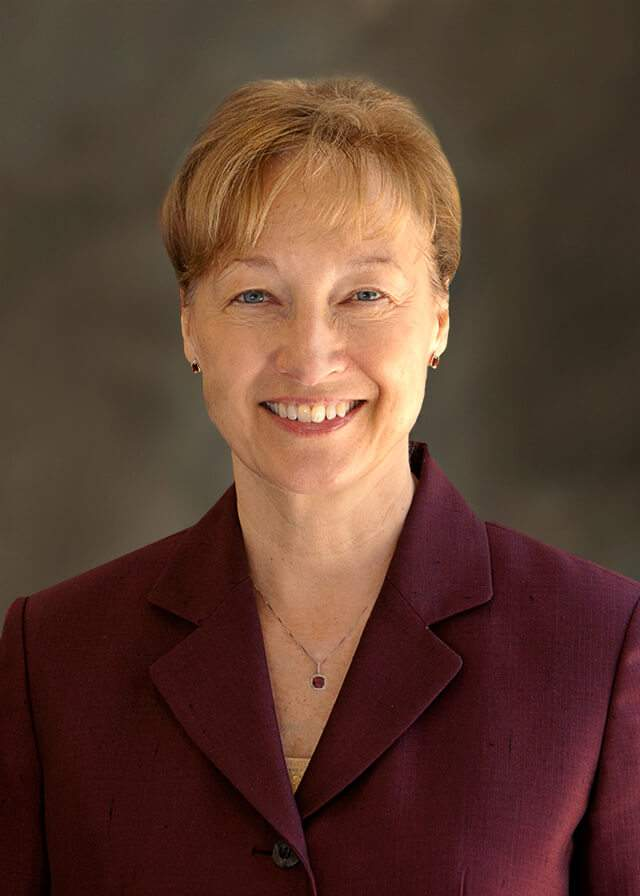

9th President of Texas State University
- In office June 11, 2002 – June 30, 2022
- Preceded by: Jerome Supple
- Succeeded by: Kelly Damphousse

Personal details
- Born: May 20, 1947 (age 79) Cincinnati, Ohio
- Spouse: Dr. John Huffman
- Children: 2
- Education: Mount St. Joseph University; Ohio State University; University of Iowa

Denise M. Trauth is the ninth president of Texas State University. On June 11, 2002, Texas State Board of Regents voted unanimously in favor of Trauth beginning her term as President.

== Early and personal life ==
Trauth was born on May 20, 1947, and grew up in Cincinnati, Ohio. She was born second of seven daughters. Trauth is married to John Huffman. Trauth and Huffman have two children together. Trauth currently resides in San Marcos, Texas.

== Education and career ==
Trauth attended a Catholic girls' school in her youth, where she discovered journalism. Her attraction to the liberal arts took her to the College of Mount St. Joseph (Ohio), where she majored in English, because journalism was not offered. After graduating, she taught high school English and journalism in Michigan for two years, and then earned her master's degree in journalism at Ohio State University. Following her master's, Trauth entered her doctoral degree in mass communication from the University of Iowa.

She served as Electronic Media Coordinator at the University of Tulsa prior to serving for 16 years at Bowling Green State University, achieving tenure and promotion to full professor. At Bowling Green, Trauth was named to several administrative positions including assistant director of the School of Speech Communication, chair of the Department of Radio-Television-Film, and Associate Dean of the Graduate College.

In 1993, Trauth was named Dean of the Graduate School at the University of North Carolina at Charlotte and in April, 1997, she began serving as Provost and Vice Chancellor for Academic Affairs at the University of North Carolina at Charlotte. There, she led the campus through two rounds of strategic planning that resulted in the university’s integrating distance education into the curriculum and developing a new college of information technology, and the university's first residence hall-based learning community. Trauth also established the Faculty Center for Teaching, led the revision of the general education requirements, and chaired an equity study on faculty salaries.

Under Dr. Trauth’s leadership at Texas State, from 2002-2022 the university was designated a Texas Emerging Research University; was reclassified as an “R2: Doctoral University – Higher Research Activity” under the Carnegie Classification system; became a federal Hispanic-Serving Institution; moved to the FBS subdivision of NCAA Division I; and experienced its largest construction program since being founded in 1899. The university also greatly expanded the number and range of its academic programs, its external funding of research, and philanthropic giving. On August 21, 2021, Dr. Trauth announced she would retire as president effective June 30, 2022.

== Awards ==
In 2011 Trauth received the Special Achievement Award from the Austin Business Journal during the 17th annual Women of Influence Event in Austin, TX.

Also in 2011, Trauth was named one of "Austin's 30 Most Influential" published by the Austin Business Journal.

Additional awards received by Trauth include the Ohtli Award from the government of Mexico, the Carol A. Luthman Meritorious Service Award from SACSCOC, the Girl Scouts’ Women of Distinction Award, the “Respect” Award for the First Tee Greater Austin 9 Core Values Awards, and the Greater Austin Chamber of Commerce State of Education Austin Human Capital Award, and the 2021 Citizen of the Year Award from the San Marcos Area Chamber of Commerce. She was also the inaugural recipient of the Denise M. Trauth Outstanding Leadership Award in 2021 from the Texas State University Alumni Association.
