= Jack Hoffman =

Pediatric brain cancer patient (2005–2025)

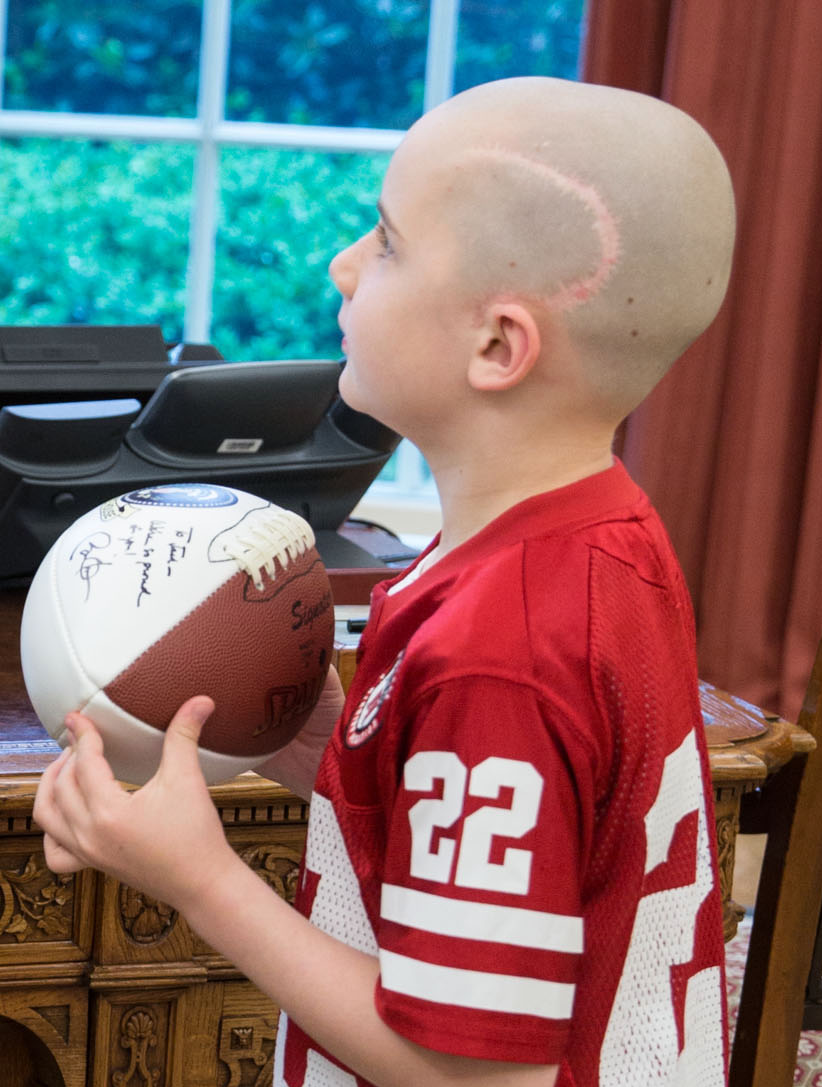
- Hoffman in 2013
- Born: September 26, 2005; Atkinson, Nebraska, U.S.
- Died: January 15, 2025 (aged 19)
- Education: West Holt High School (2020–2024); University of Nebraska at Kearney (2024)
- Occupations: Student; school football player
- Known for: Running for a touchdown for Nebraska at age 7 with brain cancer
- Awards: Best Moment ESPY Award 2013

Jack Hoffman (September 26, 2005 – January 15, 2025) was an American high school football player and pediatric brain cancer patient. In 2012, between his first and second brain surgeries, he was introduced to Rex Burkhead, then a football player for the Nebraska Cornhuskers football team. Subsequently, a close connection developed between Hoffman and the team. On April 6, 2013, at the annual Nebraska spring game, Hoffman, aged 7, entered the game during the fourth quarter and ran for a 69-yard (63 m) touchdown that received national and international attention. He subsequently met with President Barack Obama, received the Best Moment ESPY Award for 2013, and the United States Senate approved a motion recognizing his role in raising awareness of pediatric brain cancer. The Team Jack Foundation was formed by his parents, Andy and Bri Hoffman, to raise money for pediatric brain research. Hoffman died on January 15, 2025, of a brain tumor.

== Background ==
Hoffman was born on September 26, 2005, in Atkinson, Nebraska. His parents are Andy and Bri Hoffman (born Brianna Stiner) and he has two younger sisters, Ava and Reese. Andy, who briefly played football at Utah State before suffering a knee injury, had been a lawyer until selling his practice shortly after being diagnosed in 2020 with a brain tumor that ultimately claimed his life, and Bri is a pharmacist. Jack began playing football at West Holt High School in September 2020, playing his father's old position of center; according to ESPN journalist Elizabeth Merrill, "222 steps away [from the family's front porch] is West Holt High School's football field."

On April 22, 2011, Hoffman was having breakfast with his parents when he became unresponsive. He was rushed to the local hospital in Atkinson, Nebraska, where he had a grand mal seizure lasting 30 minutes. He was then flown to Children's Hospital & Medical Center in Omaha, Nebraska, due to the life-threatening seizure. He was subsequently diagnosed with a brain tumor. While at the hospital, Hoffman continued to have up to ten to twelve seizures per day, even though he was taking anticonvulsant medication. On May 20, 2011, he had surgery, but the neurosurgeon could only remove a small portion of the tumor. Subsequent pathology showed that it was a cancerous glioma, a type of pediatric brain cancer. Hoffman's parents then consulted Boston Children's Hospital for a second opinion. Neurosurgeon Liliana Goumnerova told the Hoffmans that she could remove the golf-ball-sized tumor.

On October 10, 2011, Hoffman had a second surgery. Over 90% of the tumor was removed and the seizures stopped. The surgery was followed by another sixty weeks of chemotherapy. In October 2013, Hoffman's father reported that an MRI revealed that the remaining tumor was the same size as in an MRI done in June 2013, indicating that it was not growing. In April 2014, his cancer was still in remission.

== Touchdown run ==
During the time between Hoffman's first and second surgeries, his father called Keith Zimmer who was the associate director of Life Skills at the University of Nebraska–Lincoln athletic department. He wanted to get a picture of his son with his favorite Nebraska football player, Rex Burkhead. Burkhead agreed, and met the family in September 2011. He had lunch with the Hoffman family, showed them Memorial Stadium, and decided he wanted to keep in touch with Hoffman. On Friday, October 7, 2011, Burkhead called Hoffman before his second surgery to wish him well. The next day, Nebraska played Ohio State in a game nationally televised by ABC, and ABC announcers mentioned Hoffman's story. At halftime of the game, Nebraska trailed Ohio State 20–6. At that time, Burkhead thought about Hoffman and he said to his teammates "Jack's not giving up and we're not giving up." Nebraska ended up winning the game, 34–27, which was the largest comeback in Nebraska football history.

In September 2012, Hoffman walked with the Nebraska players onto the field for their game against Wisconsin. In April 2013, as the spring football game neared, Jeff Jamrog (Assistant Athletic Director for Football) had the idea of getting Hoffman into the spring game. He ran the idea by football coach Bo Pelini the night before the game and Pelini approved. Jamrog told the Hoffmans about their plan to get Jack into the game that night and the Hoffmans quickly made a uniform for him to wear the next day.

During the game, the Hoffmans were on the sidelines with the team. As the fourth quarter began, the Red team had fourth down and one yard to go on their own 32-yard line. Pelini called timeout and sent Hoffman into the game wearing number 22 (Rex Burkhead's number). As the play began, Nebraska quarterback Taylor Martinez initially guided Hoffman in the right direction and then he ran 69 yards (63 m) for a touchdown. When he reached the end zone, the players lifted him onto their shoulders in front of 60,174 people at Memorial Stadium.

The story leading up to the touchdown run and the video of the run were covered extensively nationally and internationally. By April 16, 2013, a YouTube video of the touchdown run had been viewed over seven million times.

== Team Jack ==
After Rex Burkhead met Hoffman, a bond began to grow between him and the Nebraska football team. The players decided to start an initiative to raise money for cancer research they called "Team Jack". Team Jack sold 30,000 T-shirts and collected $275,000 in donations, which they gave to the Dana Farber Cancer Institute in Boston, Massachusetts. The Hoffman family subsequently established the Team Jack Foundation, which as of December 2020 has raised roughly $8 million for pediatric brain cancer research. Andy wrote a book about his son's journey, Yards After Contact, as a fundraiser for Team Jack; he completed the book shortly before discovering in 2020 that he had a brain tumor.

== Awards, celebrity, and influence ==
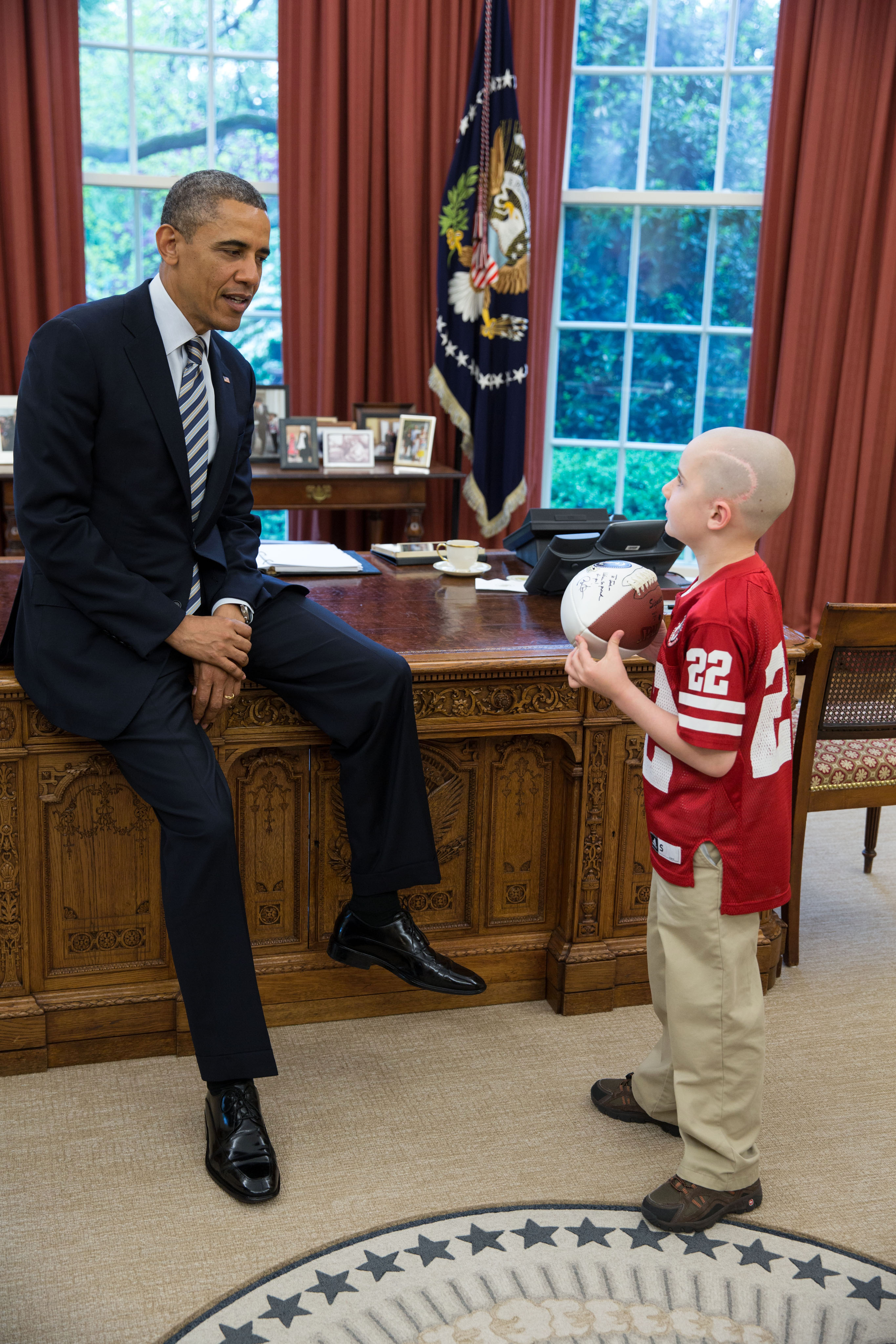
President Barack Obama greets Jack Hoffman, April 29, 2013, in the Oval Office

On April 29, 2013, the Hoffman family and Rex Burkhead met with President Barack Obama in the Oval Office for 15 minutes. Obama told Hoffman that he was proud of him and gave him a football. When asked about his meeting with the president, Hoffman replied "I thought it was awesome."

In May 2013, Upper Deck Company made a "Star Rookie" trading card for Hoffman. Upper Deck's sports marketing manager explained why they created the trading card: "Jack is the type of inspirational athlete who absolutely deserves an Upper Deck rookie card." The sale of the cards has brought in $50,000 for the Team Jack Foundation. After attending the May 16, 2014, 19th Annual Dick Vitale Gala, where Hoffman signed a trading card for Dick Vitale, the Sarasota Herald-Tribune wrote: "Yes, he may be an 8-year-old celebrity, but really, he'd much rather be a regular kid."

Hoffman won an ESPY Award for Best Moment ESPY Award in 2013.

Hoffman's touchdown run was listed fifth in The Best Emotional Moment in sports for 2013 by USA Today. Hoffman was also one of five nominees for Sportsman of the Year by Sports Illustrated in 2013.

Senator Deb Fischer offered a resolution to the Senate that states that pediatric brain cancer is a leading cause of death. The resolution also singles out Hoffman's touchdown run for increasing awareness of pediatric brain cancer:

Whereas on April 6, 2013, 7-year-old pediatric brain cancer patient Jack Hoffman joined the lineup of the University of Nebraska Cornhuskers football team for its spring football game, wearing football pads and a number 22 jersey, and ran 69 yards to score a touchdown in front of more than 60,000 fans at Memorial Stadium in Lincoln, Nebraska, touching the hearts of millions of Americans and raising awareness of pediatric brain cancer.

== Cancer returns ==
On August 5, 2014, Hoffman found out that his tumor had grown since his April 2014 MRI. His father reported that in April, there was a suspicious spot in his scan, but that they had hoped that it was nothing; likely options were further chemotherapy or surgery. After consultation with Hoffman's medical team, in mid-August 2014, his parents decided to pursue a clinical trial in Boston involving a genetic therapy approach, in part because the cancer had spread to his brain stem, making surgery difficult. Results of the 13-month clinical trial enabled Hoffman to stop active treatment in 2015.

== Father's cancer diagnosis and death ==
The Hoffman family faced another cancer crisis in July 2020, shortly before Jack was set to begin playing football at West Holt High School. Andy began to experience major personality changes, and on July 19, suffered a seizure that led him to check into West Holt Memorial Hospital, the small facility where Jack had been born. A CT scan found a large mass in his brain, and further tests at a larger hospital three hours away in Sioux Falls, South Dakota led to a diagnosis of glioblastoma. That type of cancer is typically more aggressive than Jack's glioma, and Andy's cancer was more aggressive still; by the time he had surgery at the Mayo Clinic a few days later, he had suffered two strokes and had bleeding on his brain. Andy continued to undergo treatment, but the Mayo Clinic's head of radiation oncology told ESPN's Elizabeth Merrill that the cancer was terminal. Merrill also noted, "A 15-year-old son shouldn't have to help his dad shower or use the restroom, but during Andy's worst moments, that's what Jack has had to do. He has gone from patient to caregiver." In early February 2021, Andy was diagnosed with COVID-19, which caused his neurological symptoms to worsen. Andy Hoffman died at the age of 42 on March 1, 2021.

== Second cancer recurrence and death ==
In 2023, brain scans revealed that Hoffman's tumor had grown, and he underwent another resection surgery in summer 2024; pathology results revealed that the cancer had become more aggressive. He had enrolled in the pre-law program at the University of Nebraska at Kearney shortly after the surgery. While he made the dean's list in his first and ultimately only semester at UNK, he was unable to take final exams due to his illness. In December 2024, it was said that Hoffman's latest scans that fall had found new tumor locations in his ventricular system, cerebellum, and spinal column. Hoffman died at his home on January 15, 2025, at the age of 19. On May 16, 2025, Hoffman was recognized by the University of Nebraska at Kearney and conferred with an honorary degree.
