= Cintas Center =

Arena and conference center in Cincinnati

- Rockin' 'Tas
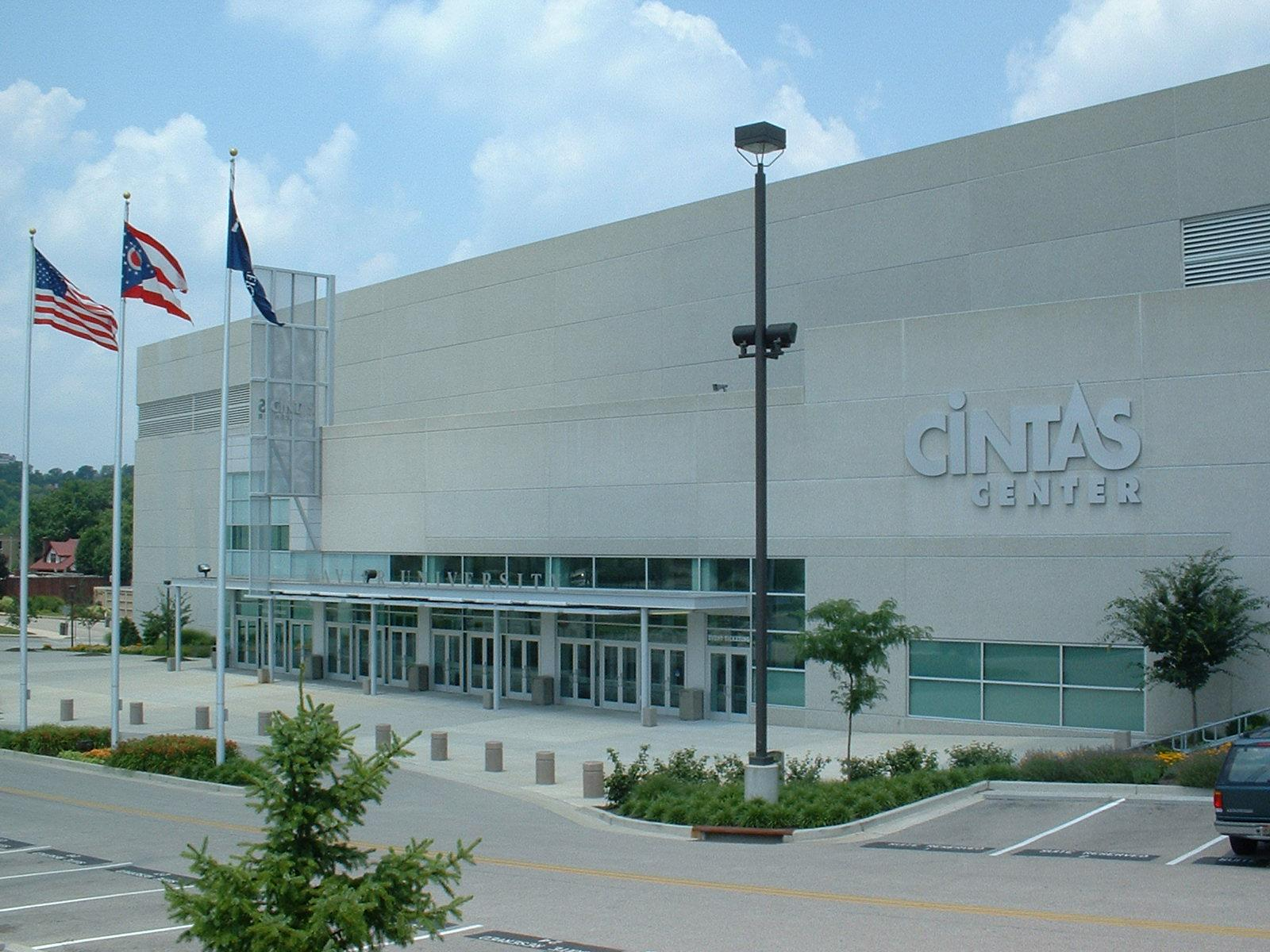
- Cintas Center in 2007
- Interactive map of Cintas Center
- Location: 1624 Musketeer Drive; Cincinnati, OH 45207
- Coordinates: 39.150148°N 84.471881°W
- Owner: Xavier University
- Operator: Xavier University
- Capacity: 10,224 (2017–present); 10,250 (2000–2017)
- Surface: Removable basketball floor; concrete
- Scoreboard: 10mm Mitsubishi DiamondVison & 16.5mm LSI/SACO
- Record attendance: 10,880 (December 5, 2025 vs. Cincinnati)

Construction
- Groundbreaking: February 26, 1998
- Opened: November 18, 2000
- Cost: $46 million ($86 million in 2025 dollars)
- Architect: NBBJ
- Structural engineers: McNamara/Salvia, Inc.
- General contractor: The Opus Group

Tenant
- Xavier Musketeers (NCAA) (2000–present)

Website
- http://www.cintascenter.com/

The Cintas Center is a 10,250-seat multi-purpose arena and conference center on the campus on Xavier University in Cincinnati, Ohio. The arena officially opened in 2000 and was constructed through private donations as part of Xavier University's Century Campaign. It is home to the Xavier University Musketeers basketball and volleyball teams. It is named for the uniform company Cintas.

== Facility ==
In the spring of 2009, Cintas Center was voted the 3rd "Toughest Place to Play" in a poll conducted by EA Sports.

Cintas Center hosted the Atlantic 10 (A10) Women's Basketball Championship in 2007 and 1st & 2nd Round games of the 2010 and 2011 NCAA Women's Division I Basketball Championship. Cintas Center also hosted the A10 Women's Volleyball Championship in 2010 and is a perennial site for OHSAA boys' basketball state tournament games. It has also hosted Cleveland Cavaliers preseason games since 2014.

On November 2, 2014, Xavier gave nearby Mount St. Joseph University free use of the arena for the school's women's basketball game with Hiram College. The game had been rescheduled, with NCAA approval, to allow terminally ill Mount St. Joseph player Lauren Hill to play in a college game. The game also served as a charity fundraiser for research into diffuse intrinsic pontine glioma, the brain cancer from which Hill was suffering. On April 13, 2015, the arena hosted a public memorial service for Hill following her death three days earlier. Later that year, the two schools launched the Lauren Hill Tipoff Classic, an annual season-opening event featuring both schools' women's teams, at the arena.

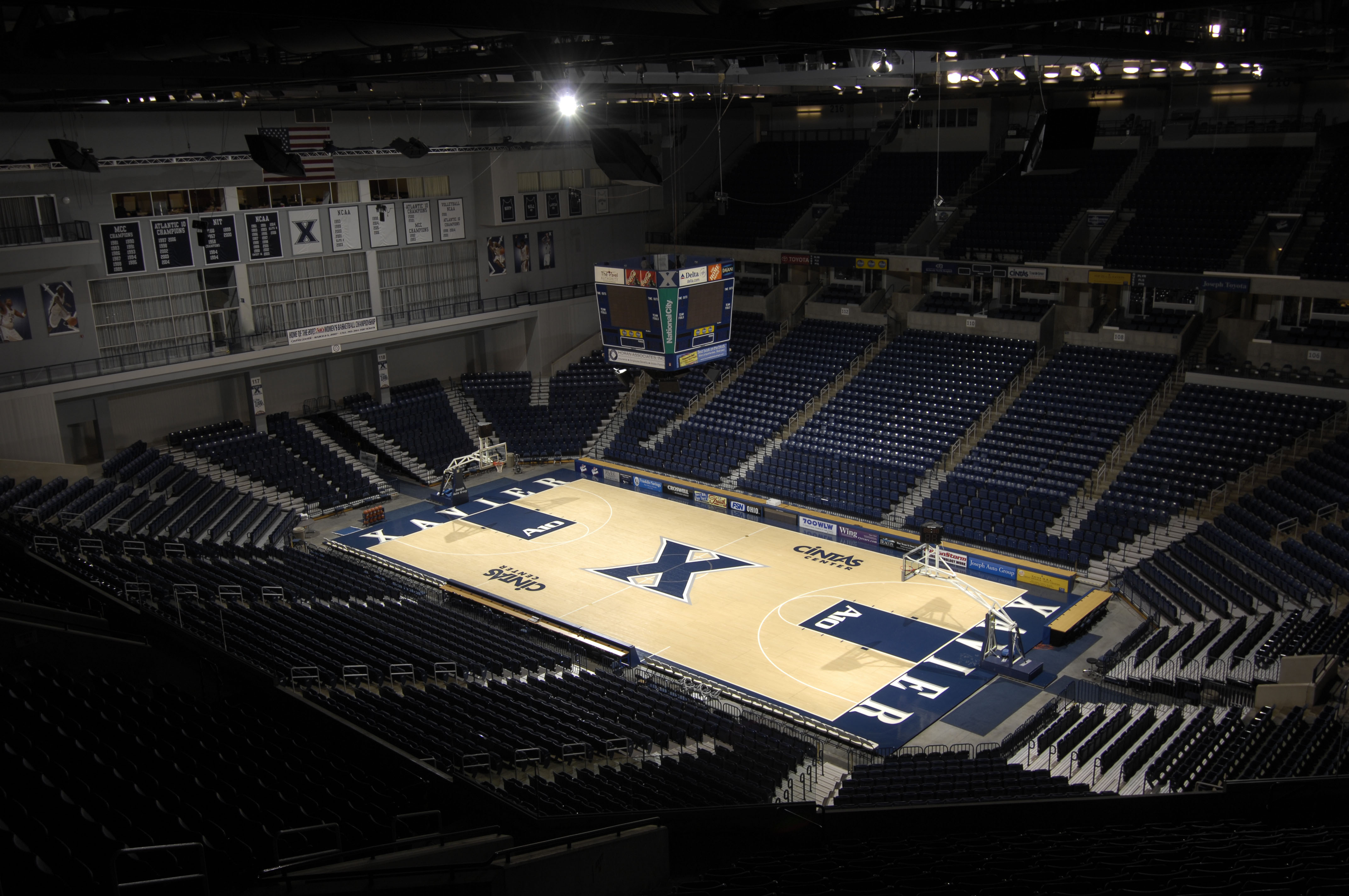
Interior of Main Arena, 2004

Within the main arena are 22 luxury boxes as well as the Joseph Club, a VIP bar overlooking the court. A practice facility, the Kohlhepp Family Auxiliary Gym, is attached to the arena and is used by the athletic teams, as well as being used as additional event space when needed. There are also state-of-the-art weight and training rooms as well as 4 large locker rooms. There is a media room that is used as a work room and for press conferences. The 2014–15 season saw a new design for the basketball floor to include the Cincinnati skyline. The arena saw a multimillion-dollar technology upgrade during the summer of 2010. A new, 10mm centerhung Mitsubishi DiamondVision video board was installed along with 16.5mm LSI/SACO scoring panels, a 360° ring and almost 600' of LED fascia ribbon board. An auxiliary scoreboard was also installed on the north wall of the arena. The luxury suites and Joseph Club were also renovated. Following the 2016 season, the basketball floor was updated to remove the skyline.

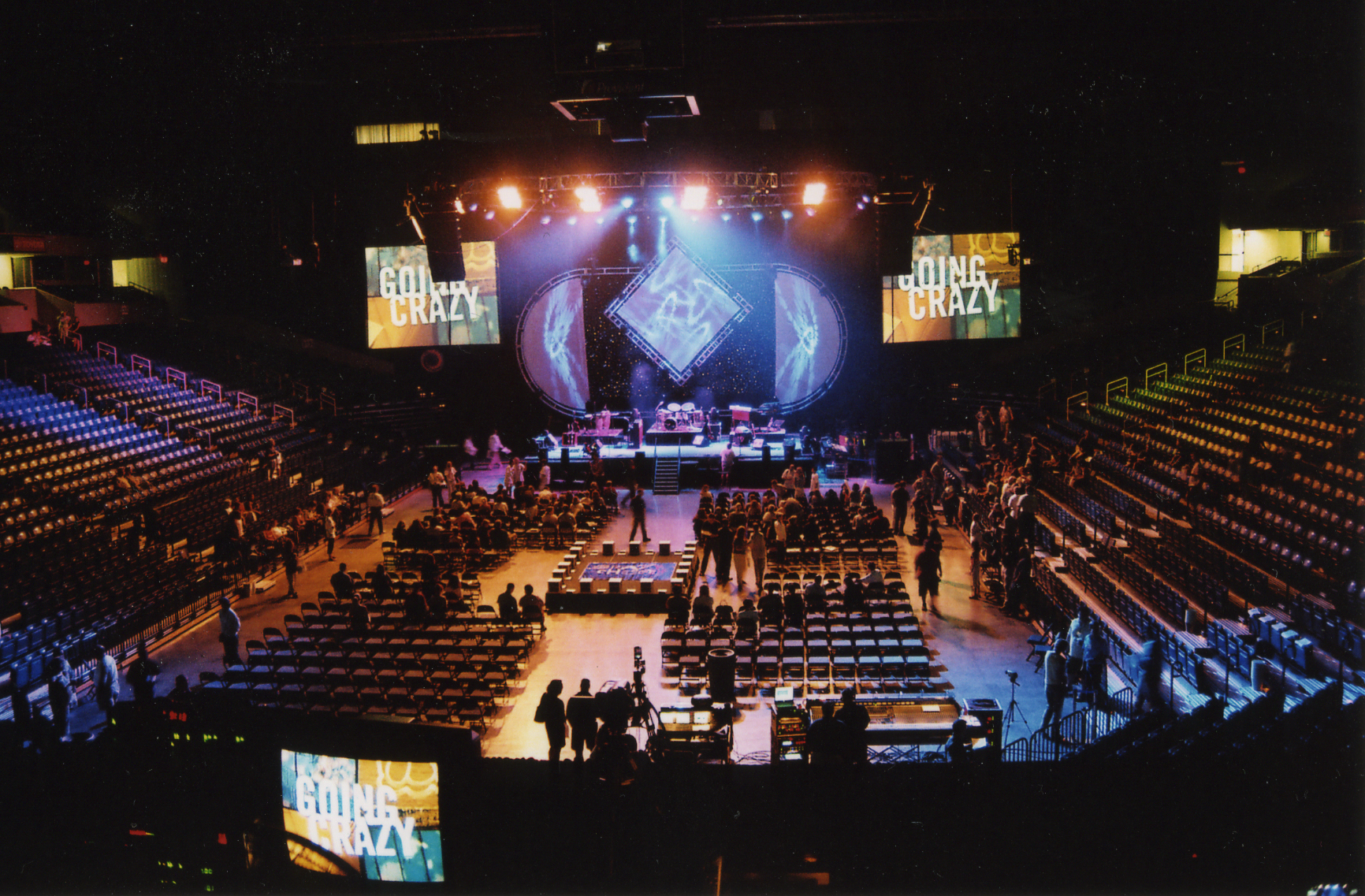
Concert Event at Cintas Center

As a concert venue Cintas Center can seat as few as 2,000 or as many as 10,000. The arena features 15,000 square feet (1,400 m^{2}) of space. It also is used for trade shows, conventions, and corporate meetings, among other events. Cintas Center also hosts upwards of 30 graduations each year.

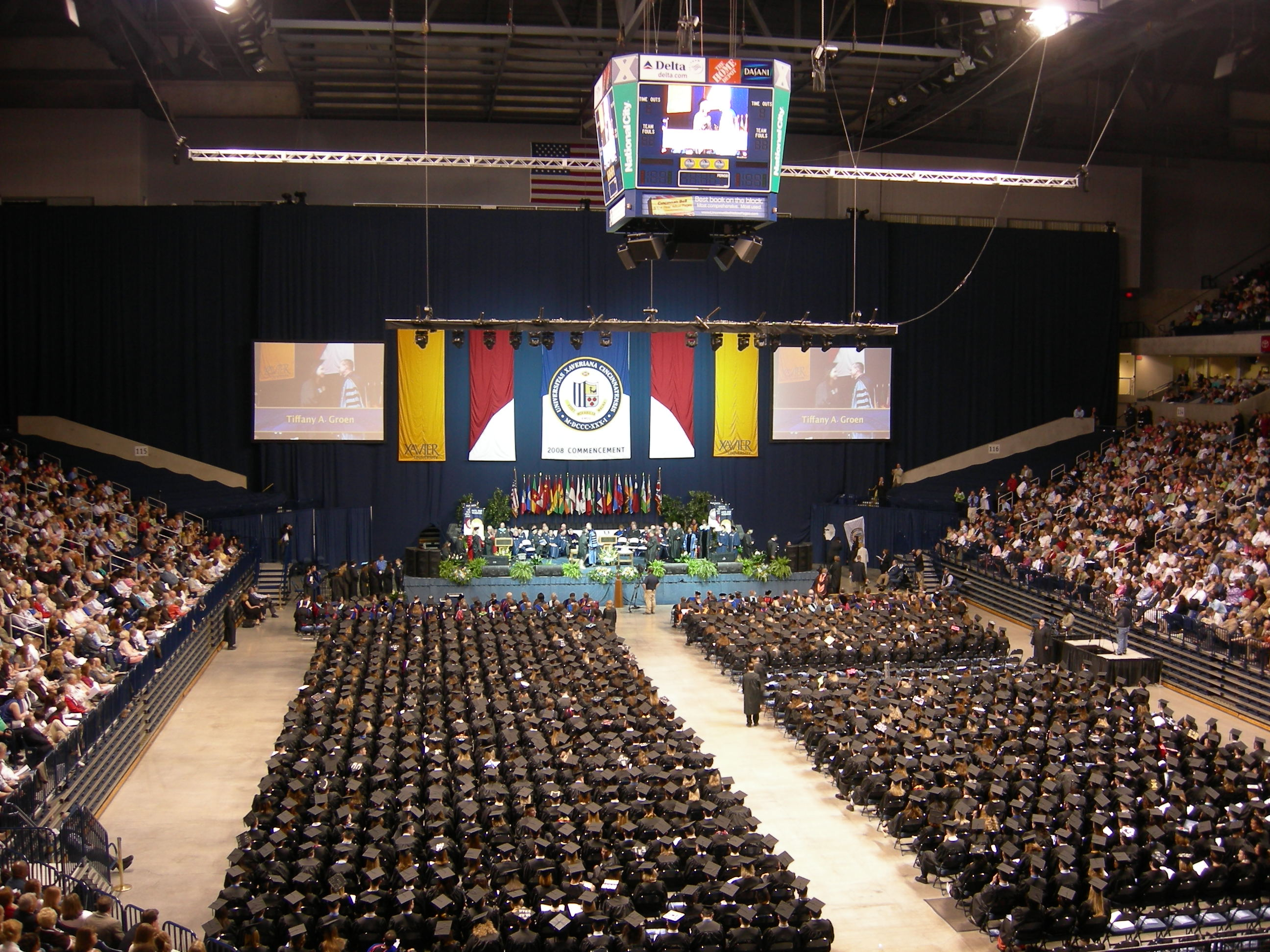
Xavier Commencement

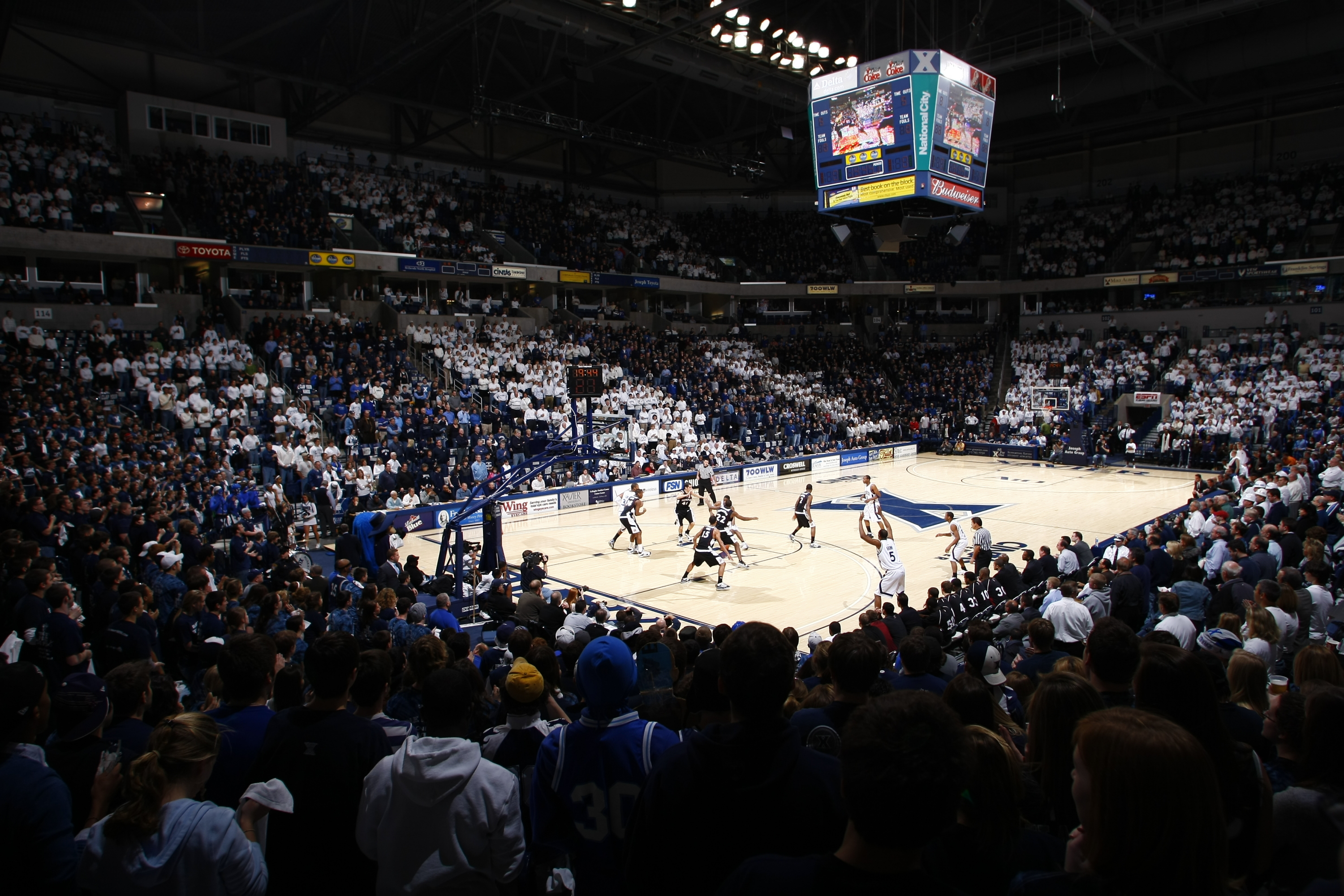
Xavier Men's Basketball game vs. Temple

== Xavier Men's Basketball ==
The main tenant of Cintas Center is the Xavier University Men's basketball team.

As of March 2019 the Musketeers have compiled a 258–41 (.863) record since moving to its on-campus home for the 2000–01 season. Xavier enjoyed a 15–0 mark at home during the 2009–10, its only perfect record for a season at Cintas Center. During the 2017–2018 season, the Musketeers set a Cintas Center record with 17 home victories. Cintas Center continues to be one of the best home-court advantages in the NCAA and was named the #3 Toughest Place to Play on EA Sports' NCAA Basketball '10.

Through the 2018–2019 season, Cintas Center has hosted 3,011,308 fans for Xavier home games and the Musketeers have averaged 10,071 fans (better than 98% capacity) per game during that time. The 2017–2018 season marked the highest average attendance in Cintas Center history with an average 10,475 (over 102% capacity) Musketeer fans at each home game.

Season	Record	Pct.	Games	Attendance	Average	Sellouts
2000–01	13–1	.929	14	141,011	10,072	12
2001–02	13–1	.929	14	143,129	10,224	13
2002–03	14–1	.933	15	152,664	10,178	14
2003–04	13–3	.813	16	158,432	9,902	8
2004–05	12–4	.750	16	160,429	10,027	7
2005–06	11–4	.733	15	146,615	9,774	4
2006–07	14–1	.933	15	148,650	9,910	5
2007–08	16–1	.941	17	170,133	10,008	9
2008–09	14–1	.933	15	151,456	10,097	11
2009–10	15–0	1.000	15	151,843	10,123	7
2010–11	14–1	.933	15	151,475	10,098	9
2011–12	13–3	.813	16	162,474	10,155	10
2012–13	11–4	.733	15	146,710	9,781	1
2013–14	15–2	.882	17	168,127	9,890	7
2014–15	13–3	.813	16	159,974	9,998	9
2015–16	15–1	.938	16	164,501	10,281	11
2016–17	12–4	.750	16	164,520	10,282	12
2017-18	17-1	.944	18	188,554	10,475	18
2018-19	13-5	.722	18	180,611	10,034	13
2019-20	12-5	.706	17	175,281	10,311	12
2020-21*	11-2	.846	13	5,766	444	0
2021-22	16-5	.762	21	189,793	9,038	11
2000-19	297-53	.849	350	3,211,148	9,175	203

*Attendance limited due to COVID-19 Restrictions

== Concerts, Performers & Speakers at Cintas Center ==
- Bob Dylan
- Jimmy Fallon
- Michael Moore
- Dave Chappelle
- Trey Anastasio
- Cornel West
- Talib Kweli
- Guster
- Anberlin
- Chuck D
- Paul Rusesabagina
- Sr. Helen Prejean
- Ben Folds
- Andrew Bird
- O.A.R.
- The Isley Brothers
- Jane Goodall
- Paula Deen
- John Boehner
- Robert F. Kennedy, Jr.
- Demetri Martin
- Ann Coulter
- fun.
- Jack's Mannequin
- Dane Cook
- Aaron Feuerstein
- Jason Mraz
- Sarah Brightman
- The Wiggles
- Dave Ramsey
- Blessid Union of Souls
- Sean Hannity
- Jim Rome
- The Wreckers
- Taking Back Sunday
- Fr. John Corapi
- Elie Wiesel
- Filming location for the 2011 movie The Ides of March
- Neon Trees
- Owl City

== Schiff Family Conference Center and Duff Banquet Center ==
The Schiff Family Conference Center has 5,600 sq ft (520 m^{2}) of meeting space spread across 5 conference rooms and 1 executive board room. One floor below is the 12,000 sq ft (1,100 m^{2}) James & Caroline Duff Banquet Center.

== See also ==
- List of NCAA Division I basketball arenas
