= Kelly Damphousse =

Canadian-born American academic administrator and sociologist

Kelly R. Damphousse

10th President of Texas State University
- Incumbent
- Assumed office July 1, 2022
- Preceded by: Denise Trauth

13th Chancellor of Arkansas State University
- In office July 1, 2017 – June 30, 2022
- Succeeded by: Todd Shields

Personal details
- Born: 1962 or 1963 (age 63–64)
- Spouse: Beth Damphousse
- Children: 2
- Education: Sam Houston State University; Texas A&M University

Kelly R. Damphousse (born 1962 or 1963) is a Canadian-born American academic administrator and sociologist who is the 10th president of Texas State University. Previously, Damphousse was chancellor at Arkansas State University.

== Early life and education ==
Damphousse grew up in Northern Canada, the first of two adopted children. In 1985, Damphousse left Canada to attend Sam Houston State University, where he obtained a bachelor's degree in criminal justice. He also holds a doctorate in sociology from Texas A&M University.

== Academic career ==
Damphousse began his academic career at the University of Alabama at Birmingham, and later taught at Sam Houston State. Damphousse held several dean-level positions at the University of Oklahoma from 2004 to 2017, including as NCAA Faculty Athletics Representative. In July 2017, Damphousse became the third appointed chancellor of Arkansas State University. While serving in that position, he was also elected president of the Sun Belt Conference. From January 2022 to August 2025, he represented Division I on the NCAA Board of Governors.

== Texas State University ==
On March 31, 2022, Damphousse was announced as the sole finalist for president of Texas State University, and resigned from Arkansas State. Following a statutory 21-day waiting period, the Texas State University System Board of Regents confirmed his appointment as Texas State's 10th president, succeeding Denise Trauth.

In November 2023, Texas State was announced by the Commission on Presidential Debates to be the host for a 2024 United States presidential election debate. However, the commission called off its debate schedule in June 2024 when president Joe Biden and former president Donald Trump agreed to a separate debate plan. Damphousse quoted Texas State alumnus and former president Lyndon Baines Johnson as saying, "Let no one ever think for a moment that national debate means national division."

In September 2025, Damphousse fired associate history professor Thomas Alter over comments made at an online socialism conference. Alter filed a lawsuit against the university, and following a court-ordered review, the university upheld the firing in October 2025.

=== Enrollment and expansion ===
Enrollment grew from about 38,000 students at the start of Damphousse's term to a record 47,500 in fall 2026.

In 2024, Texas State and Austin Community College announced a guaranteed transfer program, called Bats to Cats, with a $1,000 scholarship for transfer students.

In May 2025, the Texas State University System approved a new campus master plan, plus seven new degree programs. The plan includes 30 new construction projects, and a goal of 50,000 enrolled students across Texas State campuses, including an expansion of the Round Rock campus.

Following two years of planning, in 2025 Texas State opened a campus in Santiago de Querétaro, Mexico. Damphousse called it Texas State's "first entry into international locations", with other locations in planning stages, including Costa Rica, Scotland, and Italy.

=== Athletics ===
Under Damphousse, Texas State signed a $23 million, 15-year naming rights deal with University Federal Credit Union to rename Bobcat Stadium to UFCU Stadium. The university described it as the largest corporate sponsorship for a Sun Belt football stadium.

On June 30, 2025, Texas State accepted an invitation to join the Pac-12 Conference. The Texas State board of regents approved a $5 million payment to exit the Sun Belt Conference, and the university remained in the conference for the duration of the 2025–26 season. Damphousse called the move a "declaration of our rising national profile" and "readiness to compete and collaborate" with other major research universities. Texas State officially became a full Pac-12 member in all sports on July 1, 2026. In September 2026, Damphousse was named chair of the Pac-12's executive committee.

In June 2026, Damphousse announced that Texas State would add women's gymnastics, the first NCAA Division I program in the sport in Texas, with competition set to begin in 2028.

== Personal life ==
Damphousse has been married to Beth Damphousse since 1988. They have two daughters, Kayleigh and Kristen. The Damphousses fund a Foster Educational Support Endowment at Texas State, providing financial assistance to students who spent time in the foster care system. The Damphousses gifted a sculpture by Nathan Mabry, "States Up", to Texas State University. It was unveiled in a public ceremony in April 2026.

Damphousse was named 2024 Citizen of the Year by the San Marcos Area Chamber of Commerce.
