= Beckie Francis =

Current position
- Title: Head coach

Biographical details
- Born: March 31, 1965 (age 61)

Playing career
- ?: Colgate

Coaching career (HC unless noted)
- 1994–1997: Stony Brook
- 1997–2002, 2005–2013: Oakland

Head coaching record
- Overall: 257–210 (.550)

Accomplishments and honors

Awards
- Pat Summitt Most Courageous Award (2013); 2× Summit Coach of the Year (2000, 2007)

Beckie Sue Francis (born March 31, 1965) is a basketball coach, community and charity leader, and national basketball talent evaluator. She was the head coach of the Oakland University women's basketball team. At Oakland, she compiled a 227–162 (.584) record, and has a 257–210 (.550) career head coaching record. She coached two Kodak All-Americans and 11 all-conference players during her tenure. Francis led Oakland to three consecutive postseason appearances, with two NCAA tournament bids and one WNIT appearance.

After her head coaching career, she turned to helping community causes. She has served as a Board Member for The Compass Center in South Dakota, helping with sexual assault awareness and prevention. She also served on the Board of Self-Spiration in South Dakota. In Texas, she has been active on the Board of the Comal County Children's Advocacy Center.

She is currently a national talent evaluator for Blue Star Basketball.

Francis played college basketball at Colgate University where she was a four-year starter and three-time team captain. She was an assistant coach at the University at Buffalo for four years. From 1994–1996, she was the head coach at Stony Brook University, then an NCAA Division II program, where she compiled a 30–48 record. Oakland hired Francis as the program was making the transition from Division II to Division I.

Francis coached at Oakland from 1997–2013, taking a three-year sabbatical from coaching for health reasons between the 2001–02 and 2005–06 seasons. Her teams won the conference tournament championship twice, and the conference regular season championship three times. The 2006 season where the Grizzlies went 19–13, featured a school record 12-game winning streak. She earned her second conference coach of the year award during the 2006 season. At the time of her hiring at Oakland on July 1, 1997, her salary was $50,000; by July 1, 2012 it had been increased to $126,381 along with a 15% performance bonus totaling $15,703. Her players did well academically, earning her teams high marks in the NCAA's Academic Progress Rate. Francis' teams placed in the WBCA Top-25 for team GPA Nationally for six consecutive seasons from the 2007–08 season through the 2012–13 season.

In October 2012, Francis revealed in an interview with the Associated Press that she had been sexually abused by her father between the ages of 4 and 13. That winter she testified before the education committee of the Michigan House of Representatives and later lobbied representatives in support of Erin's Law, bipartisan legislation allowing schools to educate students about sexual abuse. For her work in this area she received national acclaim, and in April 2013, during the NCAA women's Final Four, she was the recipient of the Pat Summitt Most Courageous Award, given by the U.S. Basketball Writers Association, for demonstrating "extraordinary courage while facing adversity in life."

In 1999, Francis married then-president of Oakland University, Gary Russi. She was fired with cause in June 2013, on the same day her husband retired as Oakland president. Despite the separation, Russi and Francis have remained closely connected with the school and attended the inauguration for current President George W. Hynd as VIP guests.

The school released a statement that an investigation began in April after concerns about her conduct and behavior, and that Francis had been terminated with cause. A follow-up article by the Detroit Free Press investigated the allegations, noting interviews with former players. However the paper published a retraction of the story on May 11, 2014.

== Head coaching record ==
Record table
Season	Team	Overall	Conference	Standing	Postseason
Stony Brook University (NCAA Division III Independent) (1994–1995)
1994–1995	Stony Brook	13–12			
Stony Brook University (NECC) (1994–1997)
1995–1996	Stony Brook	7–19	5–15		
1996–1997	Stony Brook	10–17	6–12		
Stony Brook:		30–48	11–27		
Oakland (NCAA Division I Independent) (1997–1999)
1997–1998	Oakland	20–7	—	—	
1998–1999	Oakland	14–13	—	—	
Oakland (The Summit League) (1999–2013)
1999–2000	Oakland	19–10	13–3	1st	
2000–2001	Oakland	20–10	12–4	1st	
2001–2002	Oakland	17–14	8–6	T-2nd	NCAA first round
2005–2006	Oakland	15–16	8–8	T-5th	NCAA first round
2006–2007	Oakland	19–13	12–2	1st	WNIT first round
2007–2008	Oakland	20–10	12–6	T-2nd	
2008–2009	Oakland	26–7	16–2	2nd	WNIT first round
2009–2010	Oakland	17–13	14–4	T-2nd	
2010–2011	Oakland	20–12	12–6	T-3rd	
2011–2012	Oakland	11–17	7–11	T-6th	
2012–2013	Oakland	9–20	3–13	9th	
Oakland:		227–162	117–65		
Total:		257–210			
National champion Postseason invitational champion Conference regular season champion Conference regular season and conference tournament champion Division regular season champion Division regular season and conference tournament champion Conference tournament champion
