= Todd Shields =

American political scientist and educator (born 1968)

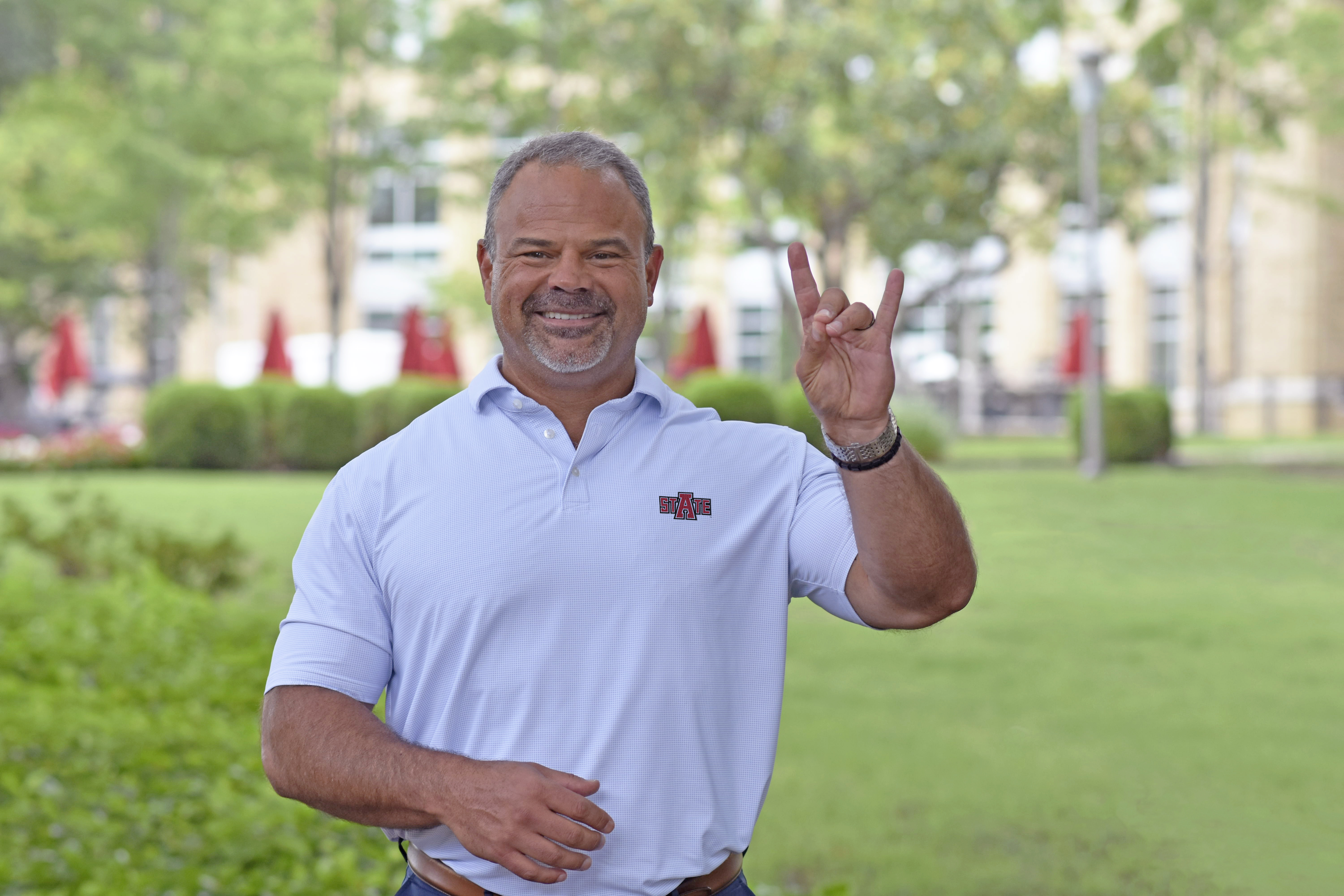
- Dr. Todd Shields was named the 14th Chancellor of Arkansas State University in 2022.

14th Chancellor at Arkansas State University
- Incumbent
- Assumed office August 15, 2022
- Preceded by: Kelly Damphousse

Academic background
- Education: Miami University (BA); University of Kentucky (MA, PhD)
- Thesis: Network news, attributions of responsibility, and the role of visual images (1994)
- Doctoral advisor: Mark Peffley

Academic work
- Discipline: Mass communications
- Institutions: University of Arkansas; Arkansas State University

Todd Shields (born August 3, 1968) is an American educator who is the current chancellor at Arkansas State University. He previously served as a political scientist at the University of Arkansas, where he was Dean of the J. William Fulbright College of Arts and Sciences.

== Education ==
He completed his B.A. in psychology and political science at Miami University in 1990, and received his M.A. and Ph.D. from the University of Kentucky in 1991 and 1994.

== Career ==
As Dean of Fulbright College, he led the largest college in the university, home to over 8,500 students pursuing degrees in degrees in the fine arts, humanities, natural sciences and social sciences. Shields led the development of the third accredited collegiate School within the College, the School of Art launched in 2017 with the support of a $120 million gift from the Walton Family Charitable Support Foundation. The School's interdisciplinary outreach was enhanced by the Windmere Foundation's gifts in 2017 and 2021, totaling $70 million, to create and expand the Windgate Art and Design District, an off-campus built community in the City of Fayetteville, to serve as a hub for student and faculty artists and designers.

Dean Shields's research interests lie broadly in American campaigns and elections, though he also researches in political psychology, political communication, and research methods. The author of many journal articles, his first book examines the likely effects of campaign finance referendums on congressional elections. He is the co-author of Money Matters: The Effects of Campaign Finance Reform on Congressional Elections and the co-editor of The Clinton Riddle: Interdisciplinary Perspectives of the 42nd President. With D. Sunshine Hillygus, Shields wrote The Persuadable Voter: Wedge Issues in Presidential Campaigns, published by Princeton University Press, which the Political Psychology Section of the American Political Science Association awarded the 2009 Robert E. Lane Award for the Best Book in Political Psychology.

He is a Professor of political science, and formerly served as Chair of the Department of Political Science, Associate Director of the Fulbright Institute, Interim Dean of the Clinton School of Public Service, Dean of the Graduate School and International Education, and Director of the Diane D. Blair Center of Southern Politics and Society., for which he organized the New South Consortium, 2005 Conference, chaired by Senator David Pryor.

On August 15, 2022, he succeeded Kelly Damphousse as the chancellor of Arkansas State University.
