= Mount St. Joseph University =

Catholic university in Delhi Township, Ohio, US

- Former names: As college: College of Mount St. Joseph (1920–2014)
- Motto: Deo Duce
- Motto in English: "With God for a leader"
- Type: Private university
- Established: September 1920; 106 years ago
- Affiliations: Roman Catholic
- Academic affiliations: ACCU; SOCHE; CIC; NAICU
- Endowment: $79.8 million (2025)
- President: H. James Williams
- Students: 2,265 (fall 2024)
- Undergraduates: 1,545 (fall 2024)
- Postgraduates: 720 (fall 2024)
- Location: Delhi Township, Ohio, United States; 39°05′42″N 84°38′16″W
- Campus: 92 acres (37 ha); Suburban
- Colors: Blue and gold
- Nickname: Lions
- Sporting affiliations: NCAA Division III – HCAC, MCVL, ORLC
- Mascot: Lion
- Website: www.msj.edu

The Mount St. Joseph University (The Mount) is a private Catholic university in Delhi Township, Ohio, United States. It was founded in 1920 by the Sisters of Charity of Cincinnati. The university enrolls over 1,800 undergraduate students and approximately 300 graduate students across 48 undergraduate programs, nine associate degrees, pre-professional and certificate programs, and graduate programs.

== History ==
Mount St. Joseph University was established by the Sisters of Charity of Cincinnati, Ohio, a religious congregation that traces its roots to Elizabeth Ann Seton, North America's first canonized saint. The first Sisters of Charity arrived in Cincinnati from Maryland in 1829 and opened St. Peter's Academy, then St. Mary's Academy. By 1853, these schools were replaced by Mount St. Vincent Academy. In 1906 the academy was named Mount St. Joseph after a move to the Mount St. Joseph property in Cincinnati's Delhi Township, owned by the Sisters of Charity.

Mount St. Joseph Academy offered a four-year high school curriculum but also postgraduate study covering two years of college. In 1920, the Ohio Department of Education granted formal approval for a college curriculum. The College of Mount St. Joseph opened the doors to its first 20 students in September 1920 as the first Catholic college for women in Southwestern Ohio – the same year that American women gained the right to vote.

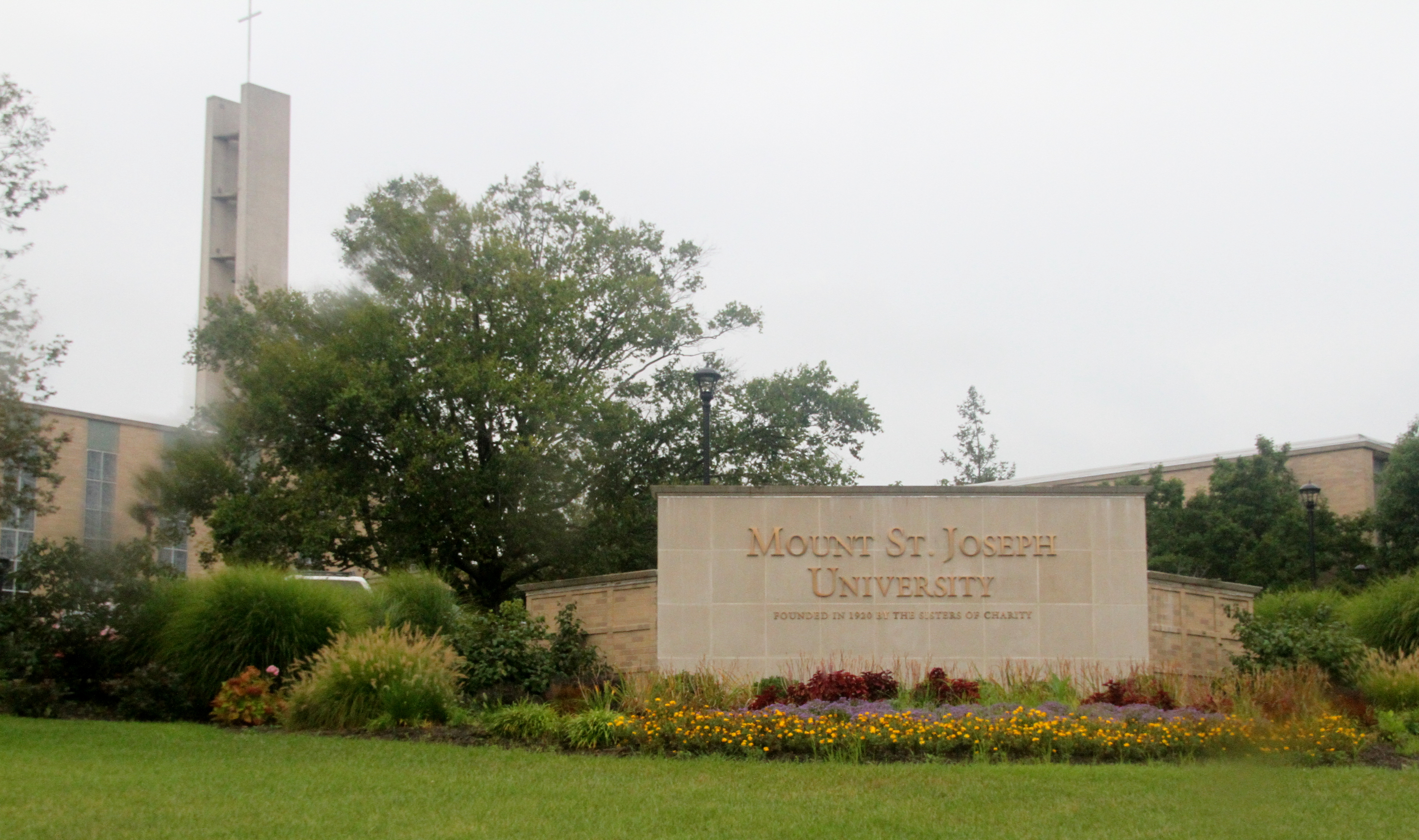
University sign

By the 1950s, the Sisters of Charity made plans to develop property at the intersection of Delhi and Neeb Roads into a new campus that opened in fall of 1962. By the 1970s, adult education brought a new population of women to campus for degree studies, and by 1986, the college was coeducational. The Sisters of Charity continued to operate the college until 1972 when the Mount was incorporated under a board of trustees. The institution remains a sponsored ministry of the Sisters of Charity.

On October 9, 2013, the college announced the change to university status. It would be known as "Mount St. Joseph University", effective July 1, 2014. The change in designation reflects the institution's expanding academic offerings, including increasing its number of graduate programs for master's and doctorate degrees, as well as implementing online programs.

== Athletics ==
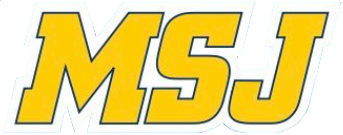
MSJ Lions wordmark

The Mount fields 23 NCAA Division III athletic teams called the Lions, most of which compete in the Heartland Collegiate Athletic Conference.

Men's sports: Baseball, basketball, cross country, football, golf, lacrosse, soccer, tennis, track and field, volleyball, wrestling and Esports.

- Two men's sports not sponsored by the HCAC have separate affiliations, both in conferences created for the 2014–15 school year. Lacrosse plays in the Ohio River Lacrosse Conference and volleyball plays in the Midwest Collegiate Volleyball League. In 2004, 2005, 2006, 2009, 2022, 2023, and 2024 the football team won the HCAC conference championship. In the 2004 & 2022 seasons, they finished the regular season undefeated.

Women's sports: Basketball, cheerleading, cross country, dance, golf, lacrosse, soccer, softball, tennis, track and field, volleyball and Esports.

- The HCAC does not sponsor women's lacrosse; that team plays on the women's side of the Ohio River Lacrosse Conference.
- Cheerleading, dance and Esports are university-recognized sports, but are not recognized as official NCAA sports.

In late 2014, incoming freshman basketball player Lauren Hill was suffering from an inoperable brain tumor and facing the possibility of dying before the end of that year, and wished to play in one college game before her death. The Mount's season opener against Hiram College, originally scheduled for November 15, was moved with NCAA approval to November 2; when the event outgrew the MSJ campus, Xavier University gave MSJ free use of its arena, Cintas Center. In a sold-out game that ended up being nationally televised by Fox College Sports, Hill scored the first and last baskets. The game was the start of a charitable fundraising campaign that, by the time of her death in April 2015, raised over $1.5 million for research into the specific cancer from which Hill was suffering. She died in 2015; since her death, MSJ and Xavier have teamed up for an annual season-opening women's basketball doubleheader, the Lauren Hill Tipoff Classic, at Cintas Center.

== Greek life ==
The university has one international fraternity on campus, Delta Tau Delta. Chartered on April 28, 2018, the Kappa Eta chapter initiates male students.

in October 2019, the university announced that Theta Phi Alpha would become the first international sorority on campus for women.

== Notable alumni ==
- Garrett Bascom, member of Indiana House of Representatives
- Lauren Hill, college basketball player and pediatric cancer research advocate
- Keedy, musical artist
- Jarrod Martin, member of Ohio House of Representatives
- Jesse Minter, professional football coach
- Sarah Moormann Scharper, actress, director, teacher, writer and lecturer
- Nancy Noel, artist
- Wes Sims, mixed martial artist (did not graduate)
- Denise Trauth, president of Texas State University
- Christopher Wilke, composer, musician, and teacher

== Notable faculty ==
- Paula González
- Louis Terhar
