= Nahid Taha Abd al-Barr =

Egyptian Poetess

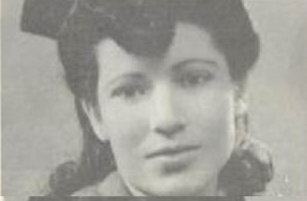
- Born: January 20, 1920; Cairo, Egypt
- Died: July 29, 1950 (aged 30); Cairo, Egypt
- Occupation: Poet

Nahid Taha Abd al-Barr (Arabic: ناهد طه عبد البرّ, romanized: Nāhid Ṭāha ʿAbd al-Barr, 20 January 1920 – 29 July 1950) was an Egyptian poet. She wrote in the classical Arabic meter (ʿamudi poetry), and most of her extant poetry dates from the late 1940s, signing it with her initials, N. T. ʿA. in Arabic (ن. ط. ع.). She wrote a manuscript for a poetry collection, Min Wahi al-Alam ("Inspired by Pain"), but it was never printed.

== Life ==
Abd al-Barr was born in Cairo in 1920 to a father who worked as a professor at the Faculty of Dar al-Uloom. She completed her secondary schooling around 1935 at Princess Fawkia School and hoped to pursue further studies at the Faculty of Arts at Cairo University, though her family refused to allow her to enroll. From the late 1940s, she began publishing poems in major Egyptian newspapers and magazines—Al-Ahram, Al Balagh, and al-Risalah.

She lived in a comfortable household in one of Cairo’s elegant districts and grew up with her sisters and one brother, Dr. Sayed Taha Abd al-Barr, who was a distinguished physician. He died in 1974, and a street in Nasr City now bears his name. Nahid never married and described herself as "the foster-child of bitter withdrawal and long solitude," stating that she "saw the world only through newspapers, books, and imagination".

Abd al-Barr’s father died in 1948, an event that deeply affected her writing. She died on 29 July 1950 at the age of thirty from a rare condition then described as "migratory phlebitis," believed by contemporaries to be a form of leukemia. Another report suggested that she committed suicide.

== Relationship with contemporary writers ==
Despite her short life and limited public visibility, Abd al-Barr’s poetry attracted the attention of prominent critics and writers of her time, most notably Anwar al-Maʿddawi (1920–1965). The critic claims that they corresponded by telephone and later recounted their exchanges in his obituary for her. He reported that Nahid once recited to him a poem inspired by a line he wrote—"Qissat Al-Uyun Allati Shakhat" ("The Tale of the Eyes That Grew Grey")—and asked him to publish it posthumously. Al-Maʿddawi described himself as a source of encouragement for her, although they never met in person. He mentions that the only two persons who met her were Ahmad Hasan al-Zayyat (1885–1968), the founder of al-Risalah, and Taha Hussein (1889–1973). An account claims that the latter was a family friend who encouraged her and promised to write a preface to her first poetry collection.

Ragaʼ Naqqash (1934–2008), a prominent Egyptian literary critic, noted that he obtained Abd al-Barr’s only extant manuscript collection, “Min Wahi al-Alam”, from her family. This manuscript included several poems written after her secondary education, such as “Amalun Da’i’’ ("A Lost Hope"), “Dahiyyat al-Taqalid” ("Victim of Traditions"), and other works centered on themes of loss, grief, and early death. Only excerpts of these poems are included in a piece Naqqash wrote on her.

== Works ==
Much of Abd al-Barr’s poetry explores themes of death, mourning, solitude, and ambition. Her earliest known poem was an elegy for her sister Amina; she later wrote elegies for her father, mother, and several friends who died young. The only extant poem signed with her full name is the elegy for her father, “Shaʿirah Tirthi Abaha” ("A Poetess Mourns Her Father") (1948).

Her work frequently reflects emotional confinement and aspiration, as expressed in her poem "Al-Shaairah" ("The Poetess") and "Ayn Assa‘adah?" ("Where is Happiness?"). As gendered restrictions on education and the public sphere shaped her life, traces of these themes are mostly apparent in her poems: "Ala Lisan al-Fatah al-Misriyya" ("On the Tongue of the Egyptian Girl"), dedicated to Qasim Amin (1863–1908), "Ila Mathali al-A‘la” (“To My Supreme Ideal”), and “Amalun Tahatamat” ("Hopes Shattered").

She mourned the death of the Egyptian poet Ali Mahmoud Taha (1901–1949) with a poem titled “Awdat al-Mallah Ta’ih,” ("The Return of the Lost Sailor"), inspired by his poem “Al-Mallah al-Ta’ih,” ("The Lost Sailor").

She also showed interest in translation, rendering into Arabic the final scene of Alexandre Dumas’s (1802–1870) The Lady of the Camellias (1848) and Coventry Patmore’s (1823–1896) A Farewell (1877).
