= Muhammad Farid Abu Hadid =

- Born: 1 July 1893
- Died: 18 May 1967 (aged 73)
- Occupations: writer, poet and historian
- Writing career
- Notable work: Arrissalah

Muhammad Farid Abu Hadid (1 July 1893 – 18 May 1967) was an Egyptian writer, poet and historian. He was the editor-in-chief of the magazine ath-Thaqafa. He helped Ahmad Hasan al-Zayyat establish the magazine Arrissalah.
