= Ahmed Zayat =

Egyptian-born American entrepreneur and racehorse owner

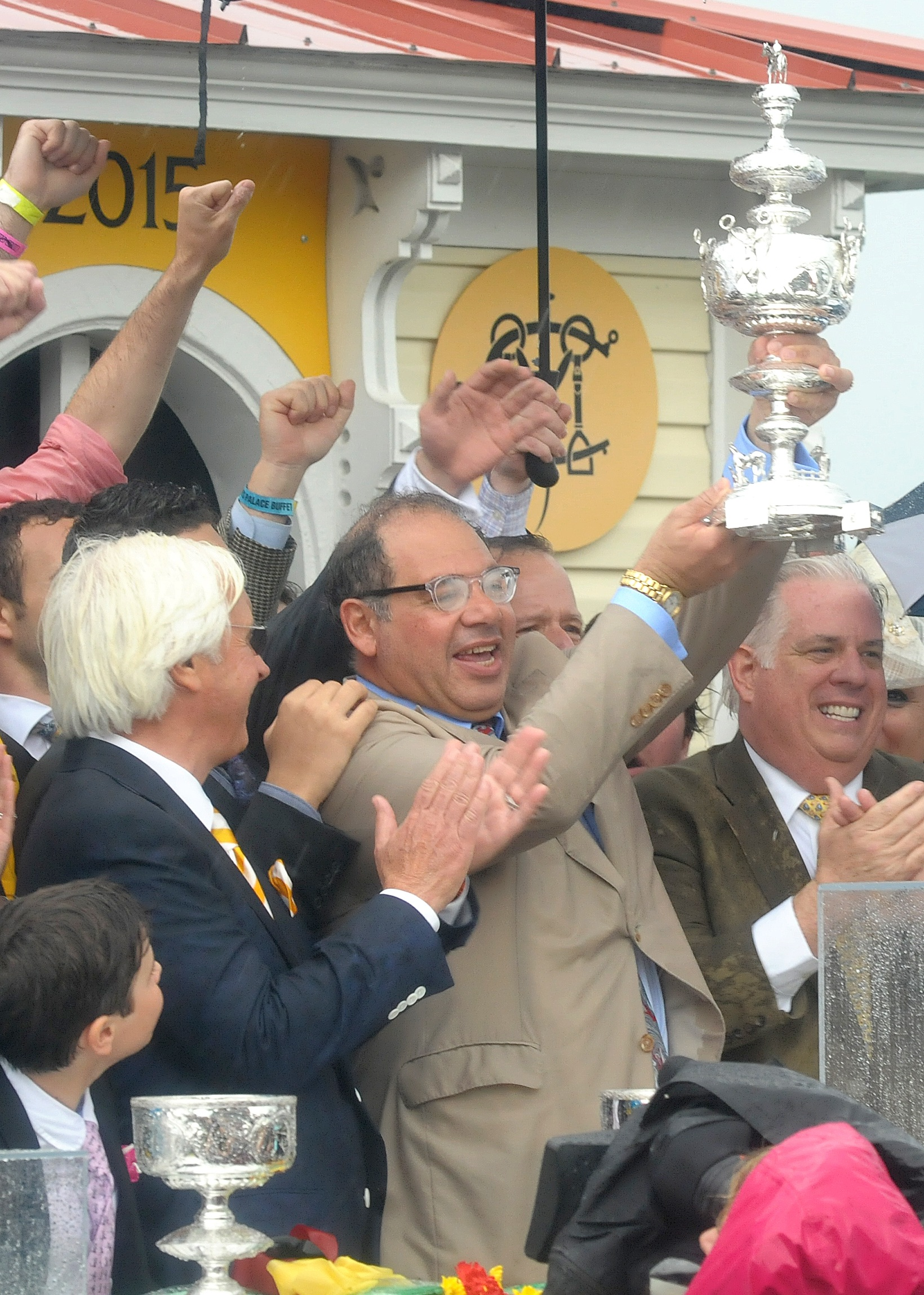
- Zayat (center) at the 2015 Preakness Stakes

Personal information
- Born: August 31, 1962 (age 64) Cairo, Egypt
- Occupations: Industrialist and horse breeder

Horse racing career
- Sport: Horse racing

Major racing wins
- American Classics/ Breeders' Cup wins Kentucky Derby (2015); Preakness Stakes (2015); Belmont Stakes (2015); Breeders' Cup Classic (2015); Graded Stakes wins Arkansas Derby (2012, 2015); Haskell Invitational (2012, 2015); Wood Memorial Stakes (2010); Ballerina Stakes (2010); Frizette Stakes (2010); Norfolk Stakes (2010); Fountain of Youth Stakes (2010); Pilgrim Stakes (2009); Triple Bend Invitational Handicap (2009); Bing Crosby Handicap (2009); Pat O'Brien Handicap (2009); CashCall Futurity (2008); Robert B. Lewis Stakes (2009); San Felipe Stakes (2009); Santa Anita Derby (2009); Shoemaker Mile (2009); Shadwell Turf Mile (2008); Del Mar Debutante (2006); La Brea Stakes (2006); Lecomte Stakes (2008); Rebel Stakes (2015)

Racing awards
- NTRA Moment of the Year (Paynter, 2012, American Pharoah 2015); Secretariat Vox Populi Award (2012, Paynter, 2015 American Pharoah); Eclipse Award for Outstanding Breeder (2015), Eclipse Award for Outstanding Owner (2015)

Significant horses
- American Pharoah, A Z Warrior, Bodemeister, Downthedustyroad, Eskendereya, Jaycito, Jojo Warrior, Justin Phillip, Nehro, Paynter, Pioneerof the Nile, Point Ashley, Rightly So, Thorn Song, Zensational, Z Fortune, Z Humor

Ahmed Zayat (Ahmed El-Zayat) (/zəˈjɑːt/; Arabic: أحمد الزيات) (born August 31, 1962) is an Egyptian-American businessman and owner of Thoroughbred race horses. He is the CEO of Zayat Stables, LLC, a Thoroughbred horse racing business which bred and owns the 2015 Triple Crown winner American Pharoah. Joe Drape of The New York Times described Zayat as "controversial" and "one of the most successful and flamboyant owners in thoroughbred racing."

Zayat was born in Cairo, Egypt to a wealthy family, and grew up in an ethnically diverse (majority Jewish) neighborhood where he learned to ride horses. At age 18, he moved to the United States where he attended college and ultimately obtained a master's degree in business and public health from Boston University. After a brief career in commercial real estate in New York City, he returned to Egypt, and for about a decade ran the Al-Ahram Beverages Company, which he owned as part of an investment group. After the company was purchased by Heineken in 2002, Zayat stayed on a few more years but also began investing in racehorses and established Zayat Stables in 2005. Upon returning to the United States for good in 2007, he made his racing stables his full-time occupation, working with his son, Justin, to build the business.

While generally successful with his race horses, Zayat's goal of winning the Kentucky Derby eluded him several times, including three second-place finishes, until his win with American Pharoah. He also filed bankruptcy proceedings in 2010 when a bank called a note due and tried to foreclose on his horses. Zayat Stables successfully completed its Chapter 11 reorganization, but Zayat was next plagued by legal issues related to his penchant for betting large sums of money on horse racing. Nonetheless, Zayat generated considerable positive publicity on social media for his efforts to save his racehorse Paynter from life-threatening health problems, a successful struggle that earned the colt the 2012 NTRA Moment of the Year Award and Secretariat Vox Populi Award.

The Zayat family lives in Teaneck, New Jersey with his wife, Joanne. They have four children: Ashley, Justin, Benjamin, and Emma. Their eldest son, Justin, helps run the Zayat Stables operation, and their youngest, Emma, inspired the name of Littleprincessemma, the dam of American Pharoah.

== Early career and personal life ==
Ahmed Zayat was born in Egypt in 1962 to an affluent family and grew up in an ethnically diverse neighborhood in the Cairo suburb of Maadi. (Note: The New Jersey Jewish Standard explained that the rise of Nasser led many Egyptian Jews to leave, but Joanne Zayat explained, "some affluent Jews stayed, for various reasons," among them Ahmed Zayat's family.) His father, Alaa al-Zayat, was a prominent doctor and professor of medicine, a personal physician to Anwar Sadat. His grandfather, Ahmed Hasan al-Zayyat, was a leading intellectual who established the Egyptian literary magazine al-Risala, described as "the most important intellectual weekly in 1930s Egypt and the Arab world." Born into what was then a peasant family, the earlier al-Zayyat studied at Al-Azhar University before taking up legal studies in Cairo and Paris; he taught Arabic literature at American University in Cairo, and for three years in Baghdad, before founding al-Risala in 1933.

As a young man, Ahmed Zayat learned to ride horses at the local country club. Zayat competed in show jumping during his early teens, winning national titles as a child in the under-12 and under-14 age divisions. He moved to the United States at the age of 18, and earned an undergraduate degree from Yeshiva University. He obtained a master's degree in public health administration from Boston University. Though the Zayat Stables, LLC website once stated that Zayat attended Harvard University, he did not. After graduation, he worked for Zev Wolfson, a New York City commercial real estate developer and investor. Zayat described Wolfson as "the toughest guy I ever worked for ... such a perfectionist. A great negotiator."

Zayat returned to Egypt in 1995 and formed an investment group, which purchased the Al-Ahram Beverages Company in 1997, outbidding Anheuser-Busch and Heineken International. Al-Ahram had been owned by the Egyptian government and Zayat had helped find American investors to take over government-owned businesses that had been nationalized by Gamal Abdel Nasser back in the 1950s. The original beer product was of poor quality, mocked as being able to "power heavy machinery if there was no diesel fuel available." Under Zayat's leadership, additional brands of beer were introduced, and he developed a non-alcoholic beer, Fayrouz, (Note: Fayrouz is a blend of malt, fruit, and sparkling water.) designed specifically for the Muslim market. The company was modernized from a run-down operation to a publicly traded business that sold in 2002 to Heineken International for $280 million, more than three times its pre-acquisition valuation, in what was then the largest corporate buyout in Egyptian history.

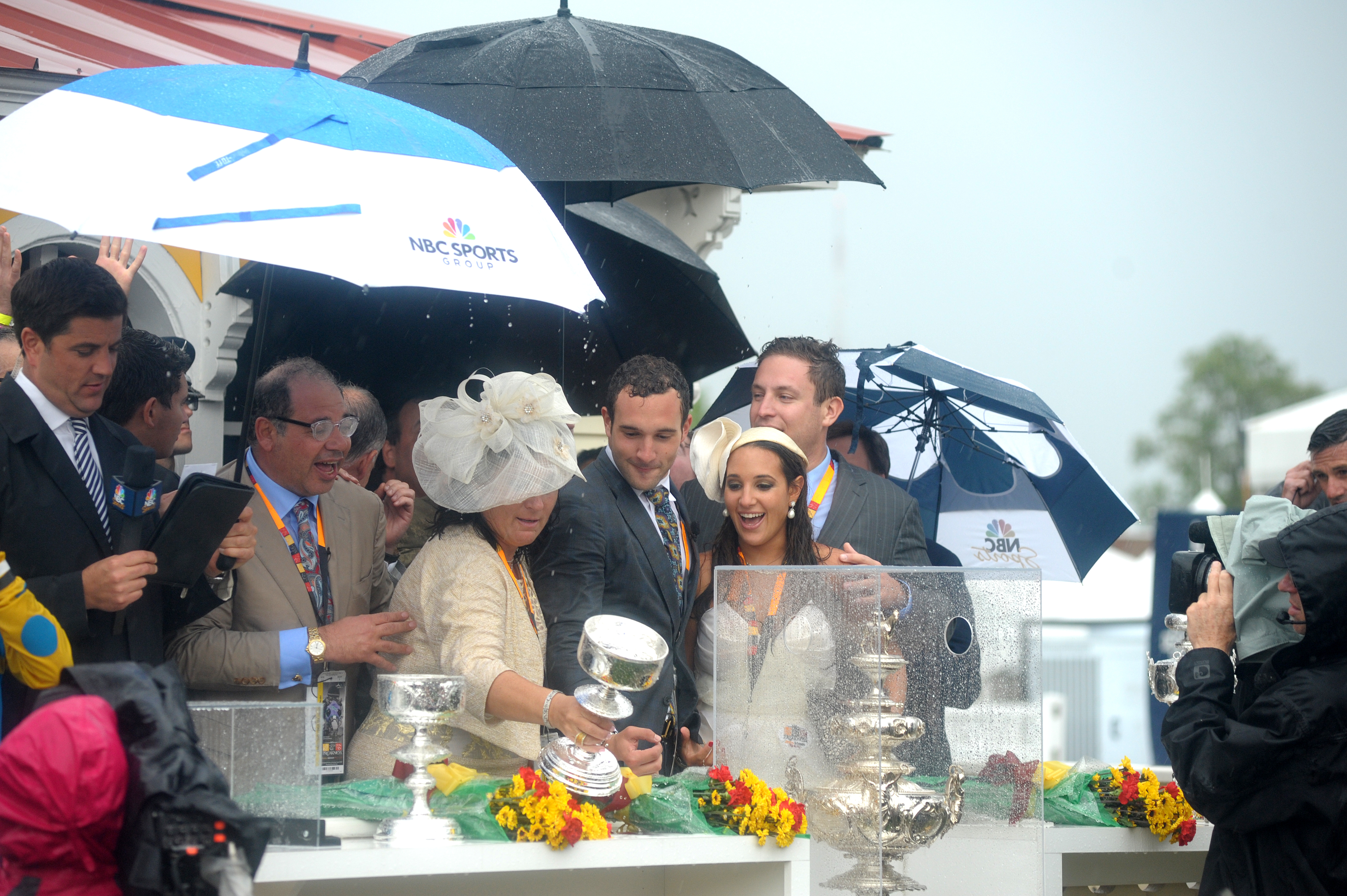
Ahmed Zayat (in beige suit) and family, including son and manager of Zayat Stables racing operations, Justin Zayat (center), at the 2015 Preakness Stakes

Zayat continued to run Al-Ahram until 2007, but periodically returned to the United States, where he started buying racehorses and formed Zayat Stables in 2005. His motivation to return to the US was, in part, to commute less and be more involved with his family and children. Upon leaving Al-Ahram, he declared that he was "retiring", but as his wife explained, "he can't be retired for more than 15 seconds," and he soon expanded his horse operation to include both breeding and racing stock. He still owns other business interests in Egypt, including being the majority shareholder of Misr Glass Manufacturing, which is Egypt's largest maker of glass containers.

Zayat lives in Teaneck, New Jersey, with his wife, Joanne. The couple have four children: Ashley, Justin, Benjamin and Emma. Justin, a 2015 graduate of New York University, works closely with his father in the Zayat Stables business. While residing primarily in New Jersey, the Zayats also have residences in New York, Egypt and London. Zayat donates to schools and charities, including those that help special-needs children. Although The New York Times has stated that Zayat has publicly identified as both Jewish and Muslim at times, Zayat stated, "Why is it relevant, and why does it matter? It's personal."

== Zayat Stables ==
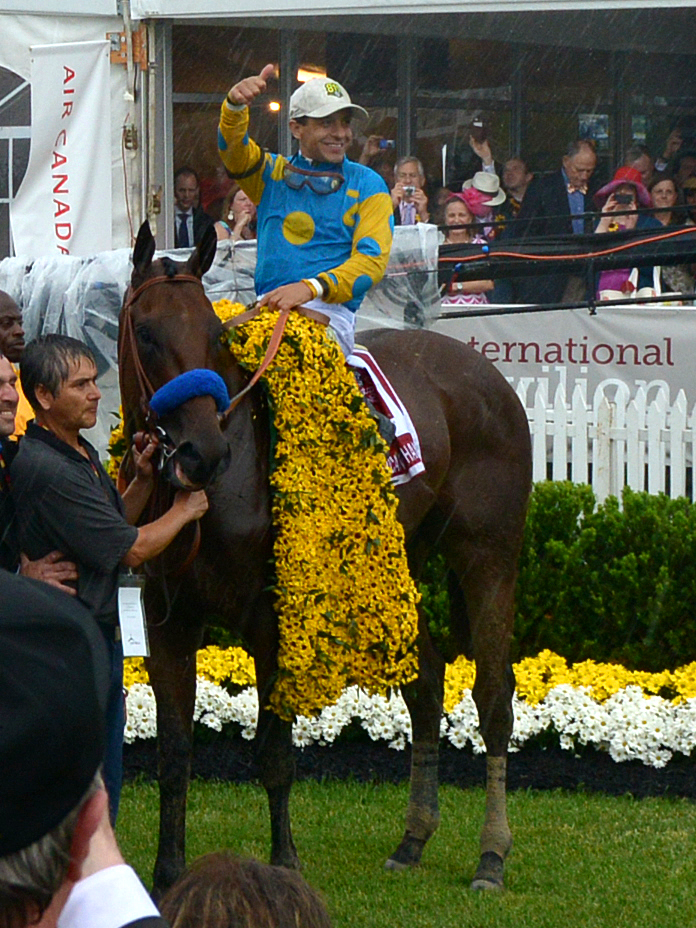
American Pharoah with Victor Espinoza up

Zayat first began buying Thoroughbred race horses in 2005. Zayat Stables owns approximately 200 horses at any one time. Zayat made a number of big-ticket sales purchases early on including a horse he named Maimonides, purchased at Keeneland as a yearling in 2006 for $4.6 million. In addition, Zayat paid $1.6 million for the highest-priced horse at the 2006 Fasig-Tipton Saratoga select yearling sale, a filly by Empire Maker named Mushka, whom he resold in 2008 for $2.4 million.

Maimonides was named in honor of the Jewish philosopher Maimonides, who is respected by both Jews and Muslims. At the time, Zayat explained, "If this horse was going to be a superstar, I wanted an appropriate name... I wanted it to be pro-peace, and about loving your neighbor." Zayat also had difficulty obtaining the name from the Jockey Club, as it had been reserved by Earle I. Mack, who owned race horses and also happened to be the chairman of the board of Benjamin N. Cardozo School of Law, . After Zayat donated $100,000 to the school to "promote peace," Mack released his reservation of the name. But, in the first of Zayat's many racing disappointments, the colt's promising racing career was cut short by injury after two races.

The horses of Zayat Stables began to earn race purses in 2006. In 2008, Zayat was North America's leading owner by earnings. Zayat Stables ranked second in the nation for earnings in 2007, third in 2009, fourth in 2010 and fifth nationally in 2011. Between 2006 and 2014, Zayat Stables ranked in the top ten leading owners by purse money won in six of those years and always in the top 20. Zayat has horses at all stages of the racing process, stallions, broodmares, young horses in training and active racing stock. His daughters were the inspiration for the names of two race horses, stakes-winner Point Ashley, who in turn inspired daughter Ashley's costume jewelry business name; and Littleprincessemma, dam of American Pharoah. Race horse Justin Phillip was named for Justin.

The business base for the horse racing operation is Hackensack, New Jersey, but Zayat's horses live in different locations across the US. His horse breeding stock live mostly in Kentucky, young horses are started in Florida. The racing stock have been in training with multiple trainers including Bob Baffert, Mark Casse, D. Wayne Lukas, Todd Pletcher, Dale Romans and others. Zayat Stables keeps about 30 broodmares and their foals in Kentucky along with roughly 20 yearlings. In 2015 the operation stood 13 breeding stallions at stud. Zayat typically retains a 25% interest in the stallions he sends to stud, though in the case of Pioneerof the Nile, he kept a 75% interest.

As of 2015, Zayat's horses include American Pharoah and 13 other Grade I winners. These include: 2013 Breeders' Cup runner and 2012 Haskell Invitational winner Paynter; 2013 Alfred G. Vanderbilt Handicap winner Justin Phillip; 2012 Arkansas Derby winner Bodemeister; Pioneerof the Nile who won the 2008 CashCall Futurity and 2009 Santa Anita Derby; three-time Grade I winner Zensational. He has entered horses in the Breeders' Cup races 16 times, with his best result a fourth-place finish in 2007.

Zayat has experienced significant highs and lows in his quest for Triple Crown classic wins. Three times Zayat's horses placed second in the Kentucky Derby. In 2009, Zayat's homebred Pioneerof the Nile started a streak of Zayat horses finishing second in the Kentucky Derby and other classic races when he was defeated by Mine That Bird. In 2010, Zayat campaigned Eskendereya, winner of the Wood Memorial and considered the favorite for the Kentucky Derby. On the Sunday prior to the Derby, Eskendereya was withdrawn from the race and subsequently retired to stud due to a soft tissue injury that would have taken at least a year to heal. In 2011, Zayat entered Nehro, who finished second to Animal Kingdom.

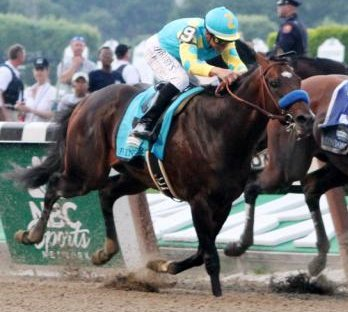
Zayat's Paynter at the 2012 Belmont Stakes

Racing silks of Zayat Stables

In 2012, Zayat Stables' horses Bodemeister and then Paynter ran second in each of the three legs of the Triple Crown. Bodemeister finished a narrow second place in both the Kentucky Derby and Preakness Stakes to I'll Have Another. Switching horses in the 2012 Belmont Stakes, Zayat's colt Paynter also finished second. Paynter went on to win the Grade I Haskell Invitational but shortly thereafter developed near-fatal complications from colitis and laminitis. Zayat authorized the highest quality of care for the horse, and following abdominal surgery and several months of rehabilitation, Paynter successfully returned to racing in 2013. After Zayat and his son Justin began making regular social media updates on Twitter with the hashtag #PowerUpPaynter, the horse developed a significant fan base, and received hundreds of get well cards, many from children. For his struggle to return to health, Paynter won NTRA Moment of the Year Award and Secretariat Vox Populi Award.

Zayat's Triple Crown race losing-streak was finally broken by American Pharoah, who won the 2015 Kentucky Derby, the 2015 Preakness Stakes, and the 2015 Belmont Stakes, becoming the first horse to win the Triple Crown since 1978.

== Litigation and related disputes ==
Zayat has been described as "controversial," and "one of the most successful and flamboyant owners in thoroughbred racing" by Joe Drape of the New York Times; his success accompanied by a number of legal controversies. His racing stable survived Chapter 11 bankruptcy proceedings, and he faced a number of legal issues associated with his penchant for betting large sums of money on horse racing.

=== Bankruptcy ===
In December 2009, Zayat was sued by Fifth Third Bank for an alleged $34 million in unpaid loans. He had taken out multiple loans from the bank totaling over $38 million between 2007 and 2009. Fifth Third alleged that Zayat was in default because he failed to make two payments in 2009. As part of the loan package, the bank had a security interest in Zayat Stables' horses, prize money, stallion shares and stallion income. Further, the bank added an amended provision to its later loans stating, "if Zayat Stables defaulted on any of the Notes, such default would be considered a default under all of the notes thereby entitling Fifth Third to accelerate the principal balance and all accrued interest due and owing under all of the Notes." While Zayat paid off some of the money owed, the bank contended that he remained in default on one loan. The bank alleged that Zayat had lost $52 million between 2006 and 2008, that he had not reported a previous Chapter 7 personal bankruptcy he had filed under the name Ephraim David Zayat, and the bank attempted to foreclose on his horses.

Zayat filed for Chapter 11 Bankruptcy protection in February 2010. He stated that the problem was that the Lexington branch of the bank worked with the Thoroughbred industry and was willing to restructure his loans, while the bank's corporate headquarters in Cincinnati wanted to get out of the equine lending business altogether. Stating that Fifth Third was "reneging on its promises," Zayat filed a countersuit in April 2010, alleging the bank engaged in deceptive and predatory lending practices. When he thought the bank was willing to restructure its loans, Zayat withdrew 67 horses he intended to sell at Keeneland's 2009 September and November sales and instead purchased 24 more yearlings. He had also paid Fifth Third $4.3 million from the proceeds of the sale of breeding rights to Zensational, all of which left him low on cash when the bank called in its loans. Zayat said the bank was using "scorched earth" tactics and accused it of trying to put him out of business, explaining that had he known the bank would not extend his loans, he would have sold enough horses to make his payments.

All cases were resolved with a settlement agreement in July 2010, seven months after the initial suit was filed. Zayat agreed to pay off his unsecured creditors over two years, without interest, and pay off Fifth Third by 2014. Zayat Stables' creditors unanimously approved the repayment plan. Zayat owed about $2.4 million to the Keeneland Association, and $1.2 million to other creditors including clinics, horse transport companies, boarding farms, and trainers—among them Bob Baffert. (Note: A 74-page list of assets and creditors was obtained by the New York Times.) He also owed several horse breeders for stud fees. To settle his debts with Fifth Third, he agreed to annual payments based on a percentage of horse sales and proceeds from claiming races. As part of his reorganization plan, he was to sell a number of horses, including 100% of his Grade I-winning horse Eskendereya. Ultimately, consistent with Zayat's tendency to retain a financial interest in his stallions, he sold an undisclosed share in the stallion to Jess Jackson and retained some breeding rights. While the selling percentage and price were confidential, Zayat Stables' reported income to the bankruptcy court for the month the deal closed was $7.5 million. (Note: Eskendereya's estimated value at the time was between $6 and $8 million.) Zayat stated, "While Chapter 11 was a necessary step to take ... I look forward to carrying out our reorganization plan, and continuing to develop some of the best horses in the country." Zayat Stables successfully completed the bankruptcy reorganization plan, in the process his stable went from a high of 285 horses to a census of 118 in 2012.

=== Gambling cases ===
Zayat's bankruptcy revealed other problems. His bankruptcy documents listed four loans he had made to members of the Jelinsky family. Two members of that family, Michael and Jeffrey Jelinsky, had pleaded guilty in 2009 to illegal bookmaking. As a result, the racing commissions in California and Kentucky opened investigations on Zayat; racing licensees are not to associate with bookmakers or convicted felons. Zayat claimed that he had no knowledge of the Jelinskys' illegal acts. He stated that he thought the brothers were professional gamblers and that they had financial need. Further, he said he loaned them money because he knew their father and that the money they owed him was unrelated to gambling; he stated that some of the money he loaned was to assist one of the brothers with a divorce. He was cleared in both states. Although New York also stated that they were investigating, there were no news reports of any adverse action. (Note: As of May 26, 2015, a diligent search by Wikipedia editors has yet to find any report on any investigation in New York.) Zayat stated that he had been visited by federal agents who played tapes where the Jelinsky brothers discussed how they had cheated Zayat out of money by giving him bad betting advice.

In an unrelated case, Zayat was mentioned in a 2013 lawsuit between Freehold Raceway and the New Jersey Sports and Exposition Authority. The plaintiffs alleged that Zayat was allowed to bet on credit, which was a violation of state law. Zayat had been betting $200,000 a week through New Jersey's online betting system, and the agency allowed him to "float" $286,000 in credit, "as a courtesy." Zayat was not a party to the lawsuit and he paid off all debts owed to the Sports Authority. The records containing Zayat's name were later redacted, but an internal email indicated that Zayat had wagered a total of at least $8.3 million.

On March 10, 2014, a lawsuit against Zayat was filed in the United States District Court for the District of New Jersey. The plaintiff, Howard Rubinsky, was an associate of the Jelinskys who had also pleaded guilty in the illegal betting operation. His suit alleged breach of contract, claiming that Zayat failed to pay off a $1.65 million line of credit in 2004. Rubinsky said he extended credit to Zayat with Tradewinds Sportsbook so Zayat could bet on horse races via a gambling website set up in Costa Rica. Zayat's lawyer described the suit as "a meritless claim", filed a motion to dismiss in 2015 alleging lack of evidence, and argued that the statute of limitations of six years had run. Zayat stated in court documents that he had met and loaned money to Rubinsky, but said, "I can say unequivocally that I did not give Mr. Rubinsky any money as payment on any debt ... I agreed to give him money because he told me he was ill and broke." On June 4, 2015, a federal judge in Newark, New Jersey, dismissed Rubinsky's lawsuit, citing both Rubinsky's difficulty in proving his case and the expired statute of limitations. In a related matter, June 1, 2015, days before American Pharoah was to run in the 2015 Belmont Stakes, the New York Times reported that Rubinsky's lawyer, Joseph Bainton, filed a $10-million libel suit against Zayat for comments to the press, including the characterization of Rubinsky's other lawsuit as "extortion, a fraud and blackmail." That suit was dismissed on August 5, 2015.

In a post-race press conference after winning the 2015 Belmont Stakes, Zayat stated that he was so anxious about American Pharoah's upcoming race that he neglected to bet on anything.
