= American Pharoah =

American-bred Thoroughbred racehorse

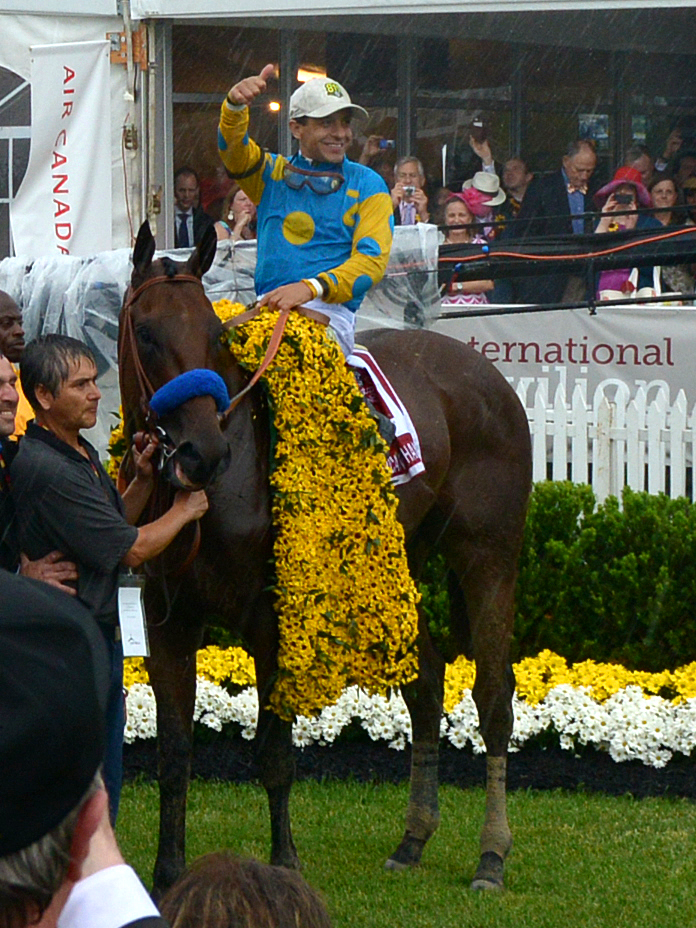
- American Pharoah after winning the 2015 Preakness Stakes
- Breed: Thoroughbred
- Sire: Pioneerof the Nile
- Grandsire: Empire Maker
- Dam: Littleprincessemma
- Damsire: Yankee Gentleman
- Sex: Stallion
- Foaled: February 2, 2012 (age 14); Lexington, Kentucky, U.S.
- Country: United States
- Color: Bay
- Breeder: Ahmed Zayat
- Owner: Ahmed Zayat
- Trainer: Bob Baffert
- Record: 11: 9–1–0
- Earnings: US $8,650,300

Major wins
- Del Mar Futurity (2014); FrontRunner Stakes (2014); Rebel Stakes (2015); Arkansas Derby (2015); Haskell Invitational (2015) Breeders' Cup wins: Breeders' Cup Classic (2015) Triple Crown race wins: Kentucky Derby (2015); Preakness Stakes (2015); Belmont Stakes (2015)

Awards
- 12th U.S. Triple Crown Champion (2015); 1st Grand Slam Champion (2015); American Champion Two-Year-Old Male Horse (2014); American Champion Three-Year-Old Male Horse (2015); American Horse of the Year (2015)

Honors
- NTRA "Moment of the Year" (2015); Secretariat Vox Populi Award (2015); IFHA World's Best Racehorse (2015); American Pharoah Way in Fayette and Woodford counties, Kentucky; Statue at Oaklawn Park; American Pharoah Stakes at Santa Anita Park; United States Racing Hall of Fame (2021)

American Pharoah (foaled February 2, 2012) is a Thoroughbred racehorse who won the American Triple Crown and the Breeders' Cup Classic in 2015. He was the 12th Triple Crown winner in history, and in winning all four races, became the first horse to win the modern Grand Slam of Thoroughbred racing. He won the 2015 Eclipse Award for Horse of the Year and 2015 Champion three-year-old. In 2021 he was inducted into the American Racing Hall of Fame. He was bred and owned throughout his racing career by Ahmed Zayat of Zayat Stables, trained by Bob Baffert, and ridden in most of his races by Victor Espinoza.

After finishing fifth in his track debut as a two-year-old, American Pharoah won his next two races, the Grade I Del Mar Futurity and FrontRunner Stakes, each by several lengths. An injury kept him out of the Breeders' Cup Juvenile, but the strength of his two wins nonetheless resulted in his being voted American Champion Two-Year-Old Male Horse at the 2014 Eclipse Awards. Before the 2015 season began, Zayat had sold breeding rights to the colt to the Ashford Stud, a division of Ireland's Coolmore Stud. He retained control over the colt and his racing career, as well as an undisclosed dividend on stud fees.

American Pharoah began his 2015 campaign with wins in the Rebel Stakes and Arkansas Derby and went on to win the 2015 Kentucky Derby and 2015 Preakness Stakes. He won the Triple Crown in a wire-to-wire victory at the 2015 Belmont Stakes, becoming the first American Triple Crown winner since Affirmed in 1978 and the 12th in history. His winning time was the second-fastest for a Triple Crown winner. He next shipped to Monmouth Park and easily won the Haskell Invitational on August 2. Three weeks later, he finished a close second in a hard-fought Travers Stakes at Saratoga Race Course on August 29, 2015, snapping a winning streak of eight races. After a layoff of two months, he shipped to Keeneland for the 2015 Breeders' Cup and ran in the Breeders' Cup Classic, where he challenged older horses for the first time and won by 6 1/2 lengths, breaking the track record.

At the conclusion of his 2015 racing year, American Pharoah was retired to stud, per the agreement between Zayat and Ashford. He stands at stud at Ashford Stud in Kentucky.

== Background ==
American Pharoah is a bay stallion with a faint star on his forehead and no other white markings. He is from the second crop of foals sired by Pioneerof the Nile, who finished second in the 2009 Kentucky Derby. The stallion's first crop included Holy Bull Stakes winner Cairo Prince, and Social Inclusion, who finished third in the 2014 Preakness Stakes. American Pharoah's dam, Littleprincessemma, was purchased by Zayat in 2007 for $250,000. She raced but did not win either of her two starts in 2008. American Pharoah was her second foal, following allowance race winner Xixixi. (Note: Xixixi was sired by Maimonides.) Since his birth, she had produced two more full siblings to American Pharoah: a filly born in 2014, (Note: The filly, a full sister to American Pharoah owned by Zayat Stables, LLC, was named American Cleopatra in early 2016.) and a colt, foaled in 2015 after she sold—in foal to Pioneerof the Nile—in November 2014 for $2.1 million.

American Pharoah was bred in Kentucky by his owner, Ahmed Zayat, CEO of Zayat Stables, LLC, and was born at 11 p.m. on Groundhog Day, February 2, 2012, at Tom VanMeter's Stockplace Farm in Lexington, Kentucky. When he was a few days old, he and Littleprincessemma went to nearby Pretty Run Farm, also owned by VanMeter, where they remained for a few months. Later, the mare and foal were moved to Vinery, another Lexington farm where Pioneerof the Nile was stabled. There, American Pharoah was weaned at five months of age, and stood out from the other weanlings due to his conformation and good temperament. (Note: Sources cited in this section differ whether he moved to Vinery at two months, "several months old", or in July 2011, at five months.)

In January 2013 as a yearling, he went to Taylor Made Farm near Nicholasville, Kentucky, and began to be prepared for possible sale. In August 2013, American Pharoah was consigned by the Taylor Made Sales Agency to the Fasig-Tipton Saratoga Yearling sale. A few weeks before the auction, American Pharoah bumped his leg and had a small lump that was visible to potential buyers at the sale, which may have discouraged bidders. He was officially purchased for the posted minimum of $300,000 by Ingordo Bloodstock, acting as an agent for Zayat, who in effect bought back his own horse. Zayat had pledged that he would not sell the promising but untested colt for less than $1 million. (Note: "I know we had a lot of live money over $200,000, that was the pulse I got", said Mark Taylor of Taylor Made Sales Agency, describing the unsuccessful 2013 auction of American Pharoah. "It's easy to look back in retrospect and say why didn't [people pay more], but you've got to remember that Pioneerof the Nile didn't stand for a ton of money and he hadn't had a lot of runners yet [. . .] and people weren't going to go crazy about something that was unproven. As it turned out, he ended up not hitting his reserve, not because people didn't love him, but because Mr. Zayat fell in love with him more than everybody else did." In 2013, Pioneerof the Nile's stud fee was $20,000. By 2015 it had tripled to $60,000.) Zayat similarly bought back Pioneerof the Nile, American Pharoah's sire, for $290,000 in a 2007 yearling auction.

"We felt that he had brilliance in him", said Zayat of American Pharoah, "his demeanor, his aura, his conformation, the way he moved." Following the auction, the horse first went to Florida and was started under saddle at the McKathan Brothers Training Center near Citra, where trainer J.B. McKathan said, "He just did everything right." Once he was ready to begin race conditioning, he went into training with Hall of Fame inductee Bob Baffert in the spring of 2014.

He was described in 2014 as a ridgling, rather than a colt, meaning that he had an undescended testicle. The 2013 catalogue for his yearling Fasig-Tipton sale listed him as a "colt", and he was described that way again in 2015. Zayat maintained the "ridgling" designation was an error: "he was always a colt."

In 2015, Baffert noted American Pharoah's smooth and distinctively long stride: "I've never had a horse that moves or travels over the ground like he does." The horse also had a short tail during his two- and three-year-old seasons—it was apparently chewed off by another horse. It is theorized that Mr. Z, a fellow competitor and Zayat-bred colt, may have been the culprit; the pair were kept together in Florida as younger horses. Trainer Baffert had a more colorful theory: "I think he was in the pasture one day and there was a mountain lion chasing him—that was the closest he could get ..."

American Pharoah's gentle demeanor is also distinctive, in that he appears fond of people and, particularly for a young racehorse, surprisingly calm around them. As Baffert explained, "Horses of his caliber are not that nice and sweet. They're just sort of tough. If I brought Bayern out here, you can't get near him, he's too aggressive. [American Pharoah]'s just so different than any horse I've ever had." He was not always so calm, described initially as "a little bit of a headcase", but Baffert explained that after his anxiety-ridden first race, people worked with him, schooling him in the track paddock for about two weeks, when "all the sudden he got really sweet and really mellow." That said, United States Vice President Mike Pence alleged that American Pharoah had bit him in 2018. However, a manager for American Pharoah's breeding company denied the allegation.

=== Name ===
American Pharoah's name is inspired by that of his sire, Pioneerof the Nile, and his dam's sire, Yankee Gentleman. The horse's name also acknowledges Zayat's own Egyptian-American background. The misspelling of "Pharaoh" is permanent, but inadvertent. Zayat originally claimed that the spelling was the result of an error by the Jockey Club, but the organization's president stated, "The name request for the 2012 colt American Pharoah was submitted electronically on January 25, 2014, through the Jockey Club's interactive registration site. Since the name met all of the criteria for naming and was available, it was granted exactly as it was spelled on the digital name application." Zayat later retracted his statement. (Note: The variant spelling is not without precedent. Equineline.com lists 6 registered Thoroughbreds named "Pharoah" since 1947, in contrast to 13 named "Pharaoh" or "The Pharaoh" since 1908.)

Zayat's wife, Joanne, offered another explanation for the name's origins to a local news reporter just before the Preakness. Zayat's son, Justin, ran a contest on social media in which fans could submit names for the horse. The winning entry had "Pharaoh" misspelled, she said. "Justin cut and pasted the name from [the winner's] email, and sent it to the Jockey Club." Marsha Baumgartner of Barnett, Missouri, who submitted the winning entry, told The New York Times, "I don't want to assign blame", but "I looked up the spelling before I entered." Nonetheless, Baumgartner minimized the controversy, stating, "Horses can't spell, anyway." Ultimately, Justin Zayat accepted responsibility for the error, stating, "I didn't happen to realize at the time that it was misspelled wrong [sic] ... Most English teachers in the world now are unhappy with me, but I'll live with that."

Due to the winning record of American Pharoah, the Jockey Club has now reserved both spellings so another horse cannot be similarly named. The Triple Crown blanket awarded to American Pharoah after his Belmont win inadvertently used the correct spelling of "pharaoh", and hence misspelled his name.

== Racing career ==
=== 2014: two-year-old season ===
Silks of Zayat Stables, owner of American Pharoah

American Pharoah made his track debut in a maiden race over six and a half furlongs on the Polytrack surface at Del Mar Racetrack on August 9. Ridden by Martin Garcia, he started as the 7–5 favorite against eight opponents. He became unsettled before the race and, after running in second place until the stretch, faded to finish fifth behind Om, Iron Fist, One Lucky Dane, and Calculator, more than nine lengths behind the winner. He ran in a blinker hood, which appeared to unnerve him, as did the commotion in the saddling paddock. Baffert addressed his anxiety issues by removing the hood and stuffing cotton in the horse's ears for subsequent races.

Despite his defeat, American Pharoah was moved up to Grade I class for the Del Mar Futurity over seven furlongs on September 3. He was ridden by Victor Espinoza for the first time and started as the 3.2–1 second favorite behind Best Pal Stakes winner Skyway, with Calculator and Iron Fist also in the field. American Pharoah took the lead from the start and went clear in the straight to win by four and three quarter lengths from Calculator, with a gap of more than eight lengths back to Iron Fist in third. Commenting on the colt's improvement, Baffert said, "We took the blinkers off, put cotton in his ears and schooled him a lot. He trained well, we decided he was ready and we put him in there. Today, he behaved himself and showed what he could do. He did what we thought he'd do the first time."

On September 27, American Pharoah was made the 1–2 favorite for the Grade I FrontRunner Stakes over 8 1/2 furlongs at Santa Anita Park. As in his previous race, he was immediately sent to the front by Espinoza and stayed there, pulling away from his rivals in the straight to win by three and a quarter lengths over Calculator, with Texas Red a length and a half away in third. After the race, Espinoza explained how the colt moved: "All the way he was on a high cruising speed. He has such a long stride. He moves really nice and is light on his feet." Baffert said, "I can't believe his demeanor, how he has changed since his first out. He's so professional. He's really mentally there."

American Pharoah was scheduled to run in the Breeders' Cup Juvenile at Santa Anita on November 1 but was scratched from the race after sustaining a "deep bruise" to his left front foot in a workout on October 27. After this injury, he was fitted with a special horseshoe. His farrier, Wes Champagne, placed a thin sheet of aluminum alloy over a regular racing horseshoe and cut it to match the dimensions of the shoe, leaving the front two-thirds of the hoof sole exposed, but creating a solid plate across the back that covered part of American Pharoah's heels and part of his frog. Champagne varied the design slightly depending on the tracks and races American Pharoah would run, but used the same basic concept throughout the Triple Crown series.

Even though he did not run in the Breeders' Cup, for the 2014 Eclipse Awards, American Pharoah was voted American Champion Two-Year-Old Male Horse, beating Breeders' Cup Juvenile winner Texas Red by 126 votes to 111.

=== 2015: three-year-old season ===
Five and a half months after his last start, American Pharoah began his second season in the Grade II Rebel Stakes on a sloppy track at Oaklawn Park on March 14. He carried top weight of 119 pounds and started as the 2–5 favorite against six opponents, headed by the Todd Pletcher-trained Madefromlucky. The colt led from the start and drew away in the closing stages to win by six and a quarter lengths. Espinoza called the winner "an amazing horse", while Baffert was satisfied with the run, especially as the colt returned with a twisted shoe which would have hampered his progress. Four weeks later at the same track, American Pharoah started as the odds-on favorite against seven opponents in the Grade I Arkansas Derby. After racing in second place behind outsider Bridget's Big Luvy, he took the lead a quarter of a mile from the finish and steadily increased his advantage to win by eight lengths from Southwest Stakes winner Far Right. Baffert noted, "He's matured substantially. He's a good horse and he keeps moving forward. I don't want to get ahead of myself, but Dortmund is another one who we don't yet know how good he is. We've got a one-two punch and that's a good position to be in." (Note: Dortmund is also trained by Bob Baffert.) After the race, Ron Moquett, the trainer of runner-up Far Right, described American Pharoah as "a superhorse".

==== Kentucky Derby ====
On May 2, American Pharoah started as the 2.9–1 favorite in an eighteen-runner field for the 141st running of the Kentucky Derby at Churchill Downs. His opponents included Dortmund, winner of the Santa Anita Derby; Carpe Diem, who won the Breeders' Futurity Stakes and Blue Grass Stakes; Firing Line, winner of the Sunland Derby; Wood Memorial winner Frosted; Florida Derby winner Materiality; international entry Mubtaahij, who earned his way to Kentucky with a win in the UAE Derby; and Upstart, winner of the Holy Bull Stakes. The crowd surrounding the horse during the walk-over from the barns to the paddock upset American Pharoah, and several grooms were required to keep him under control. He continued to misbehave until he was loaded into the starting gate; his connections and supporters worried that he was using up energy he needed for the race.

Espinoza positioned the colt in third place early in the race as Dortmund took the lead, followed closely by Firing Line. The three remained ahead of the pack throughout the race, and broke clear of their rivals entering the straightaway with American Pharoah making a forward move on the outside. The favorite took the lead entering the final furlong and won by a length from Firing Line and Dortmund in 2:03.02, with Frosted finishing strongly in fourth. Espinoza, who won the race for the third time, said, "I feel like the luckiest Mexican on earth. He has been a special horse since the first time I rode him. He has a lot of talent and is an unbelievable horse. Turning for home I started riding a little bit harder. At the eighth pole I just couldn't put that other horse away, but he got it done." Espinoza's performance attracted some scrutiny as he appeared to have struck the winner 32 times with his whip during the race. In post-race analysis, one of the stewards at Churchill Downs said, "we watched [the race replay] many, many times prior to making it official, and that wasn't anything that got our attention." Baffert said, "He was hitting him on the saddle towel. He doesn't hit that hard." Gary Stevens, rider of second-place Firing Line, commented that he had used his whip heavily as well, stating that the race was "as tough a race as I've been in in 20 years the last eighth of a mile." The Blood-Horse writer Steve Haskin, while condemning whip overuse in general, offered analysis that Espinoza "did a lot of waving with the whip" and may not have actually hit the horse as many times as it seemed. Reflecting on the race, Baffert said that the colt did not bring his "super A-game" to the Derby and that it was the first time American Pharoah had really been tested by other aggressive horses.

==== Preakness Stakes ====
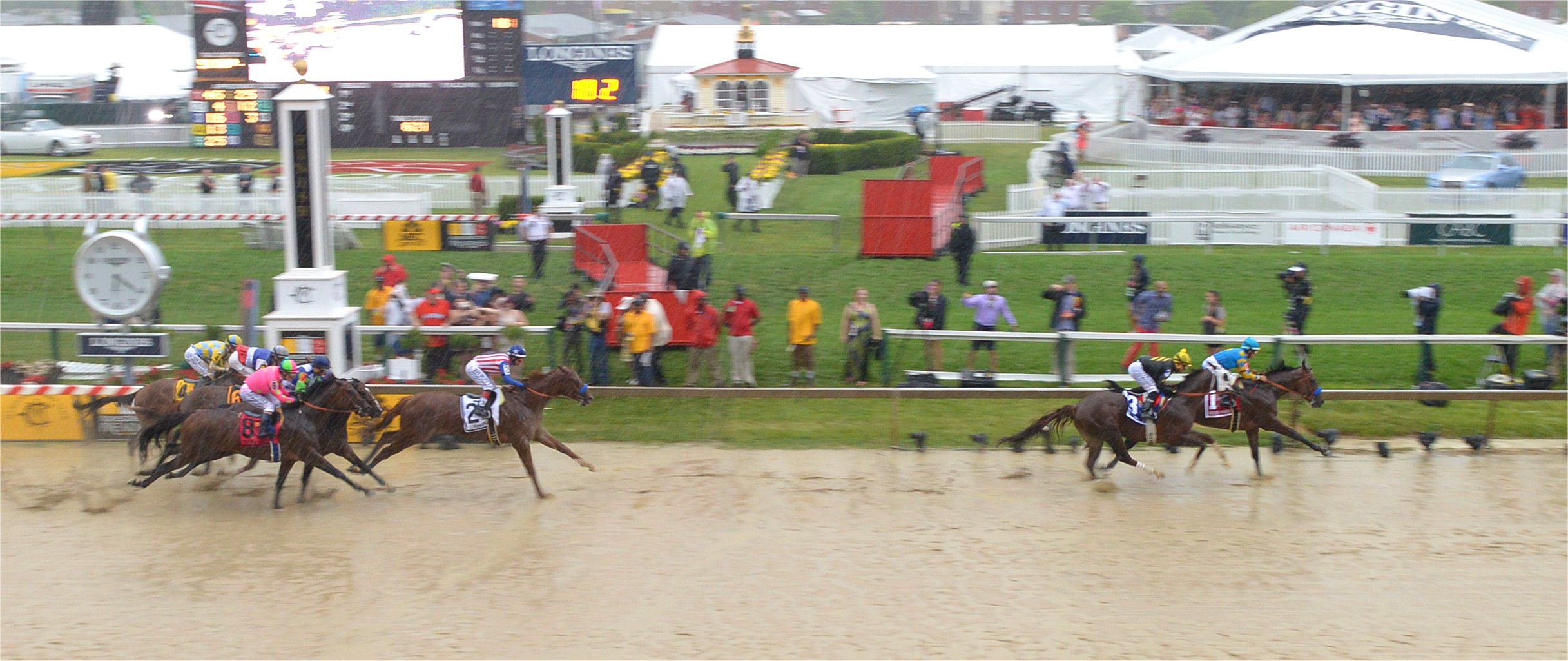
American Pharoah led throughout the 2015 Preakness, which was run on a very sloppy track.

Two weeks after winning the Kentucky Derby, American Pharoah entered the second leg of the Triple Crown, the 2015 Preakness Stakes, run over 9 1/2 furlongs at Pimlico Race Course. Despite an unfavorable inside draw of the number one post position, he was installed as the morning line favorite ahead of Firing Line and Dortmund. No horse had won the Preakness starting from the rail since 1994. Immediately before post time, the weather changed to a heavy downpour with thunder. The last time the Preakness had been run on a sloppy track was in 1983, and American Pharoah was the only horse in the field to have previously faced similar conditions, having won the Rebel Stakes running in rain and mud.

American Pharoah had the lead within the first quarter-mile and was challenged by Mr. Z early on, but held the lead on the inside throughout the race. He was challenged by Dortmund and then Divining Rod, but American Pharoah broke from the pack in the homestretch and won by seven lengths, as Tale of Verve made a strong rally to overtake Divining Rod to place. Firing Line slipped badly at the start and was eased in the stretch. The winning time was 1:58.45. Espinoza did not use his whip at all in the Preakness, and stated, "I couldn't see how far I was in front because there was so much water in my eyes." The margin of victory was tied for the sixth-largest in Preakness history. The win by American Pharoah set up an attempt for the Triple Crown for the second straight year. It was also the second straight year that Espinoza had won both the Kentucky Derby and Preakness Stakes and the jockey's third time winning both races. (Note: Espinoza also won the Derby and Preakness in 2002 on War Emblem.) For Baffert, it was the fourth time in 19 years that he won the first two Triple Crown races. Of the colt, Baffert said, "He brought his A-game today."

==== Belmont Stakes and Triple Crown ====
In the week following the Preakness, the Leverage Agency was named as the exclusive marketing, sponsorship, and licensing agents for the horse. The firm performed similar duties for California Chrome, the winner of the 2014 Derby and Preakness. The agency secured a deal with Monster Energy for an undisclosed sum, rumored to be the largest single-horse advertising sponsorship to date. The deal allowed the "Monster Girls" to be around the horse, and the product's logo to be used on the horse's horse sheets, on Espinoza's shirt collar, and on caps and other gear worn by people around the horse.

The finish of the 2015 Belmont Stakes.

In the runup to the Belmont, Baffert chose to work the horse at Churchill Downs, and transport him late to Belmont Park without a timed workout at the New York track. While several prominent trainers questioned his decision, Baffert said it was more important to keep American Pharoah "happy" on a track he liked, having used a similar strategy with his 2001 Belmont Stakes winner, Point Given. Rival trainers Kiaran McLaughlin and D. Wayne Lukas backed Baffert's strategy; the former said, "I don't think it matters for American Pharoah. He could probably run down a street over broken glass." Appearing unperturbed but curious about a small crowd of well-wishers, American Pharoah arrived at Long Island MacArthur Airport on June 2, having traveled from Louisville, Kentucky, on a customized Boeing 727 dubbed "Air Horse One".

Three days before the race, American Pharoah's connections drew the number five post position. Pundits noted it was the same slot from which Seattle Slew had won the 1977 Belmont and the Triple Crown, and that 14 other Belmont winners had started from the position. American Pharoah was the 3–5 morning line favorite in an eight-horse field that included Tale of Verve, as well as five rivals from the Kentucky Derby who had skipped the Preakness, and one horse, Madefromlucky, who had not run either of the previous Triple Crown races, but, like Tonalist the previous year, had instead won the Peter Pan Stakes at Belmont Park. American Pharoah had previously defeated every horse entered, but he was also the only horse to contest all three legs of the Triple Crown and had run four races in the preceding eight weeks.

"This little horse deserves it ... He's a joy to be around."

— Bob Baffert

American Pharoah won the Belmont Stakes on June 6, becoming the 12th Triple Crown winner and the first since 1978, ending a "drought" of 37 years. (Note: The win was the fourth attempt at a Triple Crown for trainer Bob Baffert, who at age 62 was the second-oldest trainer to win a Triple Crown, and the third attempt for jockey Victor Espinoza, who was the first Latino jockey to win the Triple Crown, and, at age 43, the oldest.) The horse was leaning back in the starting gate when it opened and was a touch late at the start, but he soon pulled out to an early lead, which he maintained for a gate-to-wire win. He steadily increased his lead throughout the race. He was challenged by Materiality until the top of the stretch when Materiality faded, ultimately finishing last, and Frosted held second although starting to fade at the sixteenth pole. Keen Ice ran in the middle of the pack until a late rally brought him into third over Mubtaahij, who was fourth. American Pharoah crossed the finish line leading by 5 1/2 lengths, with a winning time of 2:26.65 for the 1 1/2-mile (2,400 m) race. His margin of victory was the fourth-largest ever for a Triple Crown winner at the Belmont.

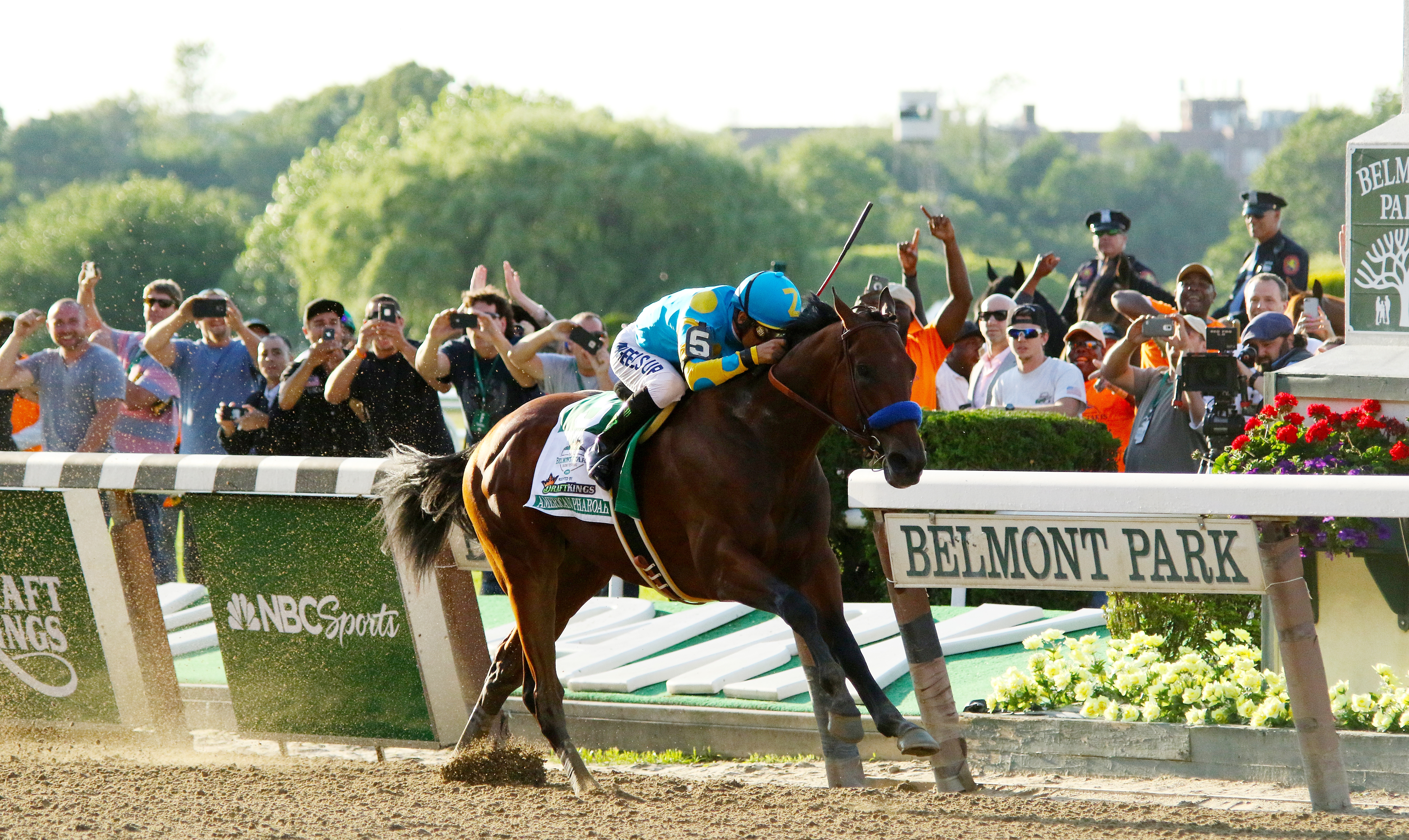
American Pharoah won the Belmont Stakes to become the 12th winner of the US Triple Crown.

Of the victory, Baffert said, "This little horse deserves it. There's something about this horse that he just brought it every time. He's a joy to be around." In a post-race interview, Zayat said that the colt's racing schedule for the remainder of the year would be decided by Baffert, and that the needs of the horse would come first. He also acknowledged the need for horse racing to have "stars" and for them to race as long as they could. Though American Pharoah's stud rights had been sold with plans to retire the horse at the end of 2015, Zayat expressed hope that the horse would continue racing as long as he was healthy and "has it in him". His winning time of 2:26.65 was the sixth-fastest in Belmont history, the second-fastest for a Triple Crown winner, and his closing quarter-mile was run in 24.32 seconds, which was over a half-second faster than Secretariat's final quarter-mile time of 25.00 when the 1973 winner set a world record and won by 31 lengths.

The following morning, the colt came out of the race tired but in good shape. When Baffert brought American Pharoah out of the Belmont Park barn, he invited the assembled media to come over and pet the horse. "I wanted to share him with everybody and show everybody how kind and sweet he is", said Baffert, while the group of about 30 people touched and even kissed the horse. The horse then posed quietly with Baffert and Espinoza to tape a segment for The Today Show, standing between the two men who were seated in folding director's chairs.

An estimated 22 million U.S. television viewers watched the live Belmont race broadcast. Of 94,237 winning $2 tickets sold at Belmont Park, each with a yield of $3.50 for American Pharoah's first-place finish, some 90,128 remained unredeemed several days after the race, most likely kept as race-day souvenirs or to be offered for sale at a premium by their purchasers.

==== Haskell Stakes ====
After the Belmont Stakes, American Pharoah returned to Churchill Downs to rest, beginning to jog on the track the following Friday. On June 13, the day of the Stephen Foster Handicap, American Pharoah was paraded on the track between races. A crowd of 30,000 people showed up to see him as he was hand-walked for about 45 minutes in front of the grandstand and in the paddock. Zayat, Baffert, and Espinoza were also given their permanent keepsake Kentucky Derby and Triple Crown trophies in a ceremony that evening. American Pharoah's popularity was so high that his win made the cover of Sports Illustrated, he was photographed for Vogue, and during the NBA Playoffs, the coach of the Golden State Warriors, Steve Kerr, suggested that American Pharoah was the only athlete better than LeBron James.

American Pharoah's next race was the Haskell Invitational at Monmouth Park, New Jersey on August 2. Zayat wanted the horse's first race back be an easy race against other 3-year-olds, he wanted to race the horse in Zayat's home state of New Jersey, and he wanted to race on a Sunday to avoid a clash with the Jewish Sabbath. Zayat explained, "He can run anywhere ... as long as he's happy and healthy ... I told [Monmouth] ... 'I want to do it for the sport and not worry about the money and stuff." Nonetheless, Monmouth Park raised the purse money for the race from $1 million to $1.75 million. Zayat had previously won the Haskell with Paynter in 2012, (Note: Paynter was also trained by Baffert.) and Baffert already held the record for the most Haskell wins, having seven previous victories. Over 60,000 people showed up at Monmouth Park, which featured the Bruce Springsteen song "Born to Run" in the post parade. Viewed as being in even better physical condition than in the Belmont, American Pharoah took the lead in the far turn and easily opened up a five-length lead over the six other horses in the race before Espinoza eased him back as second-place finisher Keen Ice made a strong finishing push. He won the race by 2 1/4 lengths with a time of 1:47.95 for the 9-furlong distance. Espinoza quipped, "He was having fun, and so was I." Baffert said, "He just keeps bringing it; he's a great horse."

==== Travers Stakes defeat ====
American Pharoah's next start was the Travers Stakes at Saratoga on August 29. While Zayat wanted to enter the race, Baffert was reluctant. The race marked the second time in under a month that American Pharoah, training with Baffert in California, had flown across the country, raising concerns that the extensive air travel was taking a toll on the horse. The only previous Triple Crown winner to win the Travers was Whirlaway in 1941, and two others, Gallant Fox and Affirmed, had been defeated there, helping give the track its nickname 'The Graveyard of Champions.' (Note: Affirmed crossed the wire first in the 1978 Travers Stakes but was disqualified, giving his big rival Alydar the win. At Saratoga, but not in the Travers, Secretariat was defeated by Onion in 1973, and Man o' War lost to Upset in 1919.) In five previous attempts, Baffert had one Travers win with Point Given in 2001. With American Pharoah training well, Baffert stated, "I've been looking for an excuse not to come (to the Travers), and I can't find one."

"He was valiant in defeat."

— Bob Baffert

American Pharoah faced a field of 10 horses, most of whom, including Keen Ice, he had previously defeated. Espinoza had concerns at the starting gate when he noticed that his mount was already sweating, even though the weather was not particularly hot. While the horse led for much of the race, he was hard-pressed throughout by Frosted, a change from Frosted's previous stalking style, attributed to a rider change less than an hour before the race, when Jose Lezcano replaced an injured Joel Rosario, altering the complexion of the race. The unexpected tactics of Lezcano may have been decisive. Espinoza stated that he "knew he was in trouble" by the half-mile pole because American Pharoah did not pull away from his rival and lacked his usual energy. Frosted challenged American Pharoah for the lead at the far turn, and the horses bumped several times, but American Pharoah dug in and fought back when Frosted took a very brief lead. While American Pharoah fended off the challenge from Frosted, Keen Ice was coming up on the outside, also under a new jockey, Javier Castellano. They overtook American Pharoah at the sixteenth pole, going on to defeat him by three-quarters of a length. Once again the Saratoga track lived up to its reputation.

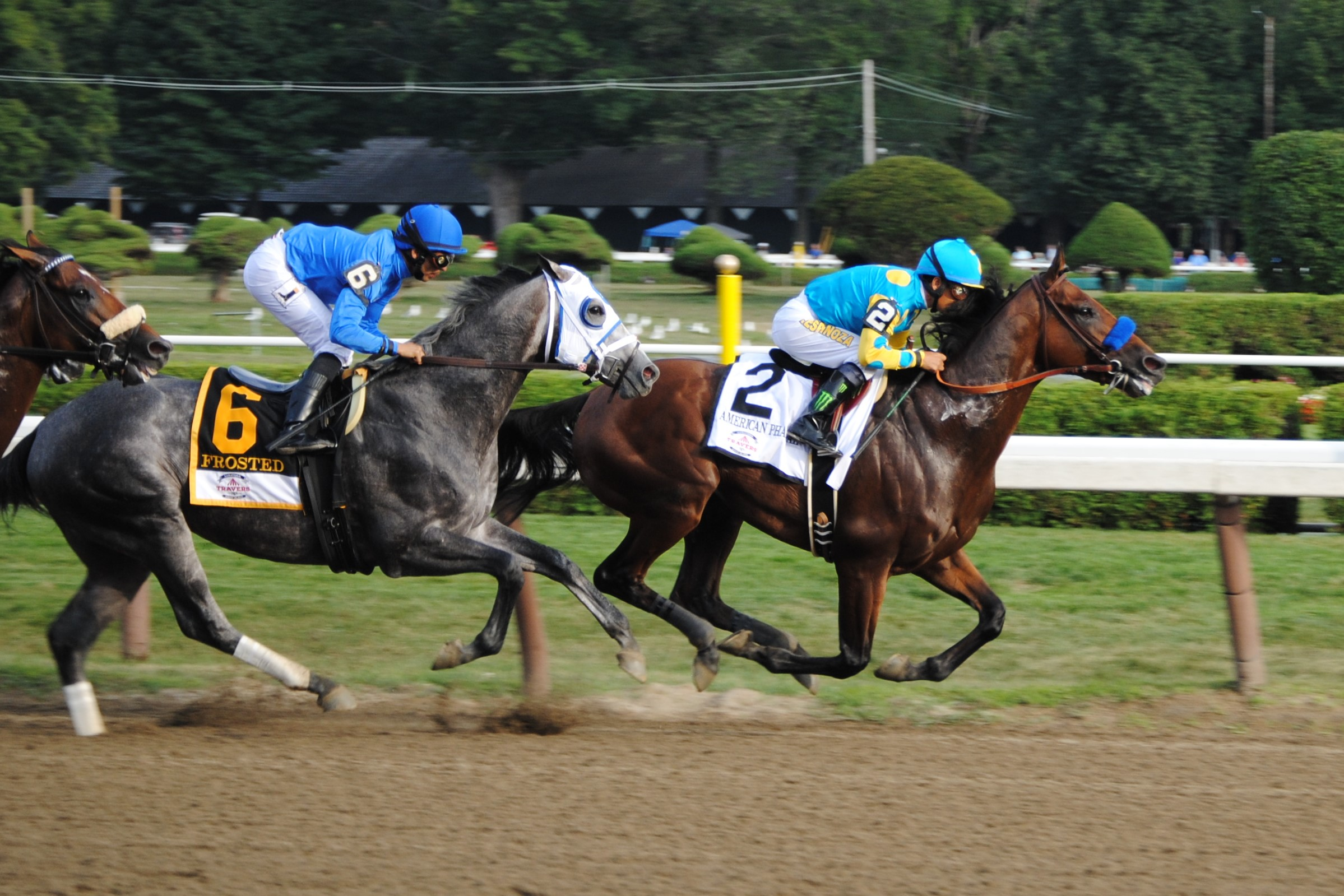
American Pharoah led Frosted for much of the run in the Travers Stakes.

After the race, Espinoza said, "He's OK ... Maybe it was just a little too much for him those three weeks, flying back and forth. He was running pretty comfortable there, but not like he used to." Baffert was proud of the horse's fighting effort, stating "It was just guts." Though Zayat talked of retiring the horse, Baffert said, "We knew we were doing the impossible, shipping him back and forth." The following day, Baffert said that American Pharoah was healthy and came out of the race in good shape. He said he had no regrets, stating, "I'm glad I brought him. Racing needed something like this. He almost pulled it off." Regarding Zayat's talk of retiring the horse, Baffert said, "Mr. Zayat is a very emotional man. We were all pretty disappointed ... I know (Zayat) will be going back and forth ... He's a sportsman for bringing him up here." Five days later, Zayat announced that the horse would be kept in training with the goal to run in the Breeders' Cup Classic, stating, "I believe there were a combination of factors that prevented American Pharoah from running his absolute best ... I have every confidence that he can run to his best again, and he deserves the chance to do so."

==== Breeders' Cup Classic ====
By winning the Breeders' Cup Classic at Keeneland on October 31, American Pharoah became the first horse in history to complete the Grand Slam of Thoroughbred racing: The Triple Crown plus the Breeders' Cup Classic. He also set a track record with a time of 2:00.07; (Note: The Breeders' Cup race series only began in 1984, so the "grand slam" was not possible for any of the previous Triple Crown winners.) and breaking the track record by more than five seconds. Challenging older horses such as Tonalist and Honor Code for the first time in his career, as well as previous rivals Keen Ice and Frosted, American Pharoah led from gate-to-wire, challenged only by Effinex, racing at 33–1 odds, who placed 6 1/2 lengths behind the winner. Although American Pharoah's decisive victory secured a $2.75 million check for his win, Zayat had long insisted his horse continued to race only for the benefit of the sport and the pleasure of fans; "this horse owes us nothing", his son Justin Zayat said on the eve of the race. Joe Drape of The New York Times described American Pharoah's Keeneland win as "sealing his legacy as a horse for the ages".

American Pharoah finished 2015 having set a single season record for race earnings, winning $8,288,800. He broke the previous single season record of $7,563,535 set by Smarty Jones in 2004, and that record had included a $5 million bonus that is no longer awarded. His lifetime career earnings were $8,650,300. His Racing Post Rating (RPR) of 138 was the highest of any American horse since the Racing Post began the system in 1988, topping that of previous U.S. record-holders Ghostzapper and Cigar. Only two horses worldwide had ever achieved higher ratings, Frankel at 143, and Dubai Millennium, with 139, both doing so as more mature four-year-olds. He was rated the number one horse in the world in 2015 by the World's Best Racehorse Rankings.

==== Awards ====
At the conclusion of the season, American Pharoah's accomplishments were named the top sports story of the year by the Associated Press. He and his connections also swept most of the horse-racing world's year-end awards. At the 2015 Eclipse Awards, he was the unanimous choice for American Horse of the Year and Champion Three-Year-Old Male Horse. His win marked only the second time that an American Horse of the Year had been unanimously selected, the first being John Henry in 1981. He was named the winner of the Secretariat Vox Populi Award, and his Belmont win was declared the NTRA Moment of the Year. His connections were given the Big Sport of Turfdom Award, an honor for people who "enhance coverage of Thoroughbred racing through cooperation with media and racing publicists." In addition, Baffert won the Eclipse Award for Outstanding Trainer and Zayat Stables took home the Eclipse awards for Outstanding Owner and Outstanding Breeder. Acknowledging owner Ahmed Zayat's record of philanthropy to Jewish causes, the Jewish Daily Forward in November 2015 named American Pharoah its "plus one" on its annual list of 50 most influential American Jews. The major award that the horse did not win was the Sports Illustrated Sportsman of the Year. In spite of being the public's overwhelming favorite, earning 47% of the vote out of eleven candidates in online voting, topping the Kansas City Royals, Usain Bolt, and Novak Djokovic, the editors of the magazine gave the award to Serena Williams. (Note: This was not the first time Williams was in contention with a race horse for a sports award; in 2009, she defeated Zenyatta for 2009 Associated Press Female Athlete of the Year)

== Statistics ==
Date	Age	Distance *	Race	Grade	Track	Odds	Time	Field	Finish	Margin	Jockey	Trainer	Owner	Ref
Aug 9, 2014	2	6 1/2 furlongs	Maiden Special Weight	Maiden	Del Mar	1.40	1:15.75	10	5	(9 1/4 lengths)	Martin Garcia	Bob Baffert	Zayat Stables	
Sep 3, 2014	2	7 furlongs	Del Mar Futurity	I	Del Mar	3.20	1:21.48	9	1	4 3/4 lengths	Victor Espinoza	Bob Baffert	Zayat Stables	
Sep 27, 2014	2	8 1/2 furlongs	FrontRunner Stakes	I	Santa Anita	0.50	1:41.95	10	1	3 1/4 lengths	Victor Espinoza	Bob Baffert	Zayat Stables	
Mar 14, 2015	3	8 1/2 furlongs	Rebel Stakes	II	Oaklawn	0.40	1:45.78	7	1	6 1/4 lengths	Victor Espinoza	Bob Baffert	Zayat Stables	
Apr 11, 2015	3	9 furlongs	Arkansas Derby	I	Oaklawn	0.10	1:48.52	8	1	8 lengths	Victor Espinoza	Bob Baffert	Zayat Stables	
May 2, 2015	3	10 furlongs	Kentucky Derby	I	Churchill Downs	2.90	2:03.02	18	1	1 length	Victor Espinoza	Bob Baffert	Zayat Stables	
May 16, 2015	3	9 1/2 furlongs	Preakness Stakes	I	Pimlico	0.90	1:58.46	8	1	7 lengths	Victor Espinoza	Bob Baffert	Zayat Stables	
Jun 6, 2015	3	12 furlongs	Belmont Stakes	I	Belmont Park	0.75	2:26.65	8	1	5 1/2 lengths	Victor Espinoza	Bob Baffert	Zayat Stables	
Aug 2, 2015	3	9 furlongs	Haskell Invitational	I	Monmouth Park	0.10	1:47.95	7	1	2 1/4 lengths	Victor Espinoza	Bob Baffert	Zayat Stables	
Aug 29, 2015	3	10 furlongs	Travers Stakes	I	Saratoga	0.35	2:01.57	10	2	(3/4 lengths)	Victor Espinoza	Bob Baffert	Zayat Stables	
Oct 31, 2015	3	10 furlongs	Breeders' Cup Classic	I	Keeneland	0.70	2:00.07	8	1	6 1/2 lengths	Victor Espinoza	Bob Baffert	Zayat Stables	

* Conversion of race distances
Furlongs	Miles	Meters
6 1/2	13/16	1,308
7	7/8	1,408
8	1	1,609
8 1/2	1 1/16	1,710
9	1 1/8	1,811
9 1/2	1 3/16	1,911
10	1 1/4	2,012
12	1 1/2	2,414

== Retirement ==
On May 20, 2015, The New York Times reported that Zayat had sold American Pharoah's breeding rights to Ashford Stud, a division of Ireland's Coolmore Stud, though he retained control over the colt and his racing career. Before the announcement, offers for American Pharoah's breeding rights had reportedly exceeded $20 million. After the Belmont, Forbes magazine reported that Zayat had actually sold the breeding rights to Ashford in late 2014, long before he began his Triple Crown run, and that Zayat retained 100% of the racing rights. Forbes went on to estimate that if American Pharoah stood for a $100,000 stud fee, he could be worth $50 million. More conservative estimates placed his potential stud fee at $75,000 and his potential value at about $25 to $36 million. The New York Times said that breeding rights had been sold for $13.8 million: $9.8 million with an additional $4 million incentive if American Pharoah won the Belmont Stakes. Zayat retained an undisclosed percentage in the colt's breeding career, and explained that American Pharoah would retire from racing at the end of 2015.

American Pharoah shipped to Ashford Stud on November 2, 2015, where he was housed in the stall once occupied by Grand Slam. He was pastured each morning next to the 23-year-old Kentucky Derby and Belmont Stakes winner Thunder Gulch, who was chosen for his calming influence on the young energetic stallion. Ashford Stud set his initial stud fee for 2016 at $200,000, the second-highest stud fee in the United States, behind that of the $300,000 fee for Tapit. Sire Pioneerof the Nile's stud fee of $60,000 in 2015 was raised to $125,000 for 2016.

== Stud career ==
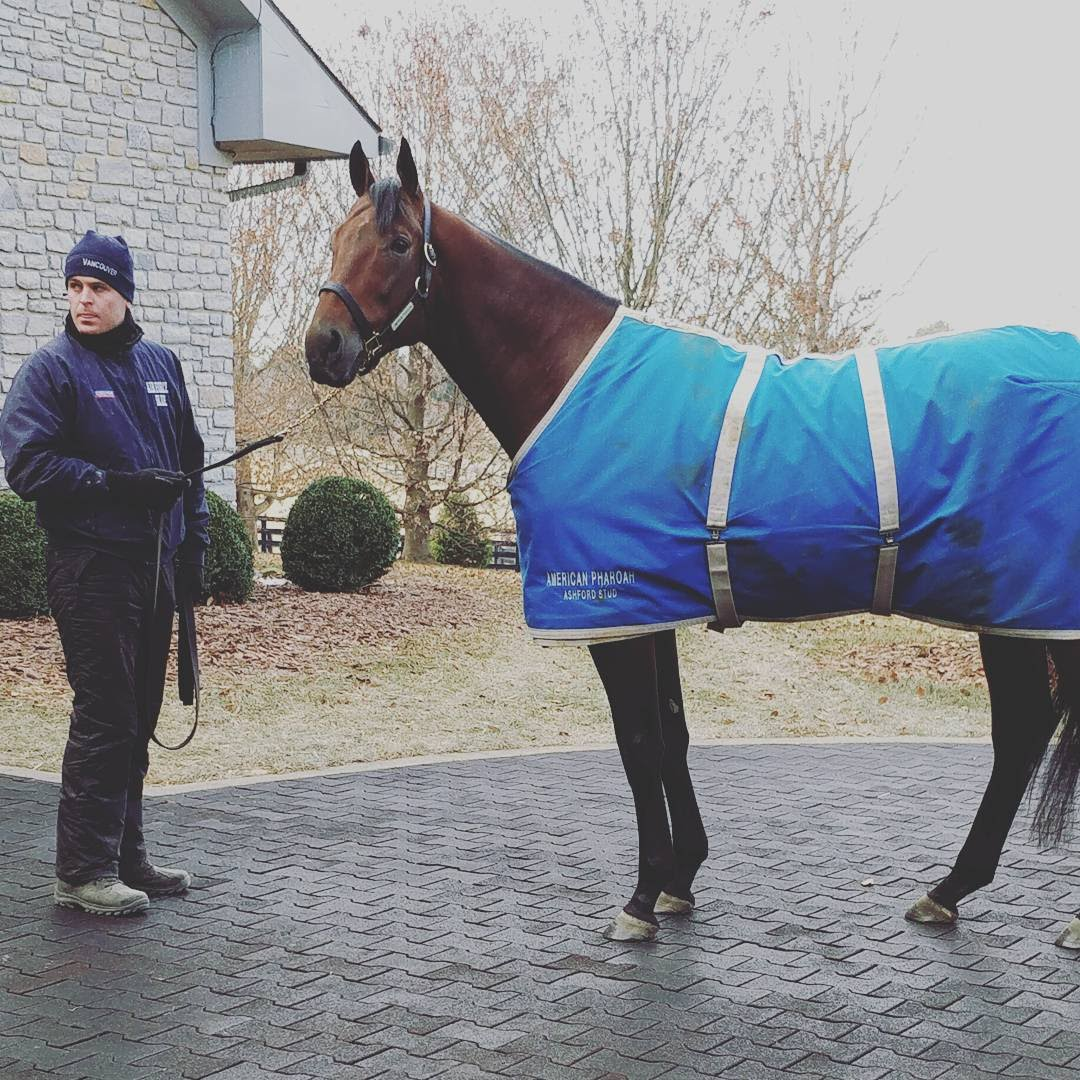
American Pharoah at Ashford Stud in 2017

American Pharoah officially began breeding mares in February 2016, and was first bred to Untouched Talent, an 11-year-old mare owned by Coolmore, dam of Zayat's Bodemeister. He had about 80 mares in foal after about 100 breeding sessions. (Note: His 2016 book included nine mares owned by Zayat Stables, and champion mares such as Judy the Beauty, Take Charge Lady, and Rags to Riches.) Notably, he retained his kind disposition even as a breeding stallion.

On January 3, 2017, American Pharoah's first foal was born at Brookdale Farms, a bay colt out of the Tizway mare, Kakadu. The foal was described as having his sire's calm but bold personality. On January 15 at Coolmore Stud, the mare Untouched Talent produced his first filly.

American Pharoah's first crop of foals sold well at the November 2017 Fasig-Tipton and Keeneland Sales, including a weanling filly who brought $1 million. Purchasers commented that his offspring at the sale inherited his efficiency of movement.

On April 13, 2019, Monarch of Egypt became American Pharoah's first winner, taking a maiden race at Naas Racecourse in Ireland. On April 19, Maven was American Pharoah's first North American winner. Maven then shipped to Europe, where he became the first stakes winner for his sire by taking the Prix du Bois at Chantilly Racecourse. American Pharoah sired three entries in the 2019 Breeders' Cup, with Four Wheel Drive winning the Juvenile Turf Sprint. Harvey's Lil Goil became his first Grade I winner when she won the Queen Elizabeth II Challenge Cup Stakes at Keeneland in October 2020, and later that month Van Gogh won the Critérium International to give the stallion his first Group 1 winner in Europe. American Pharoah had a Grade 1 winner in Japan on February 21, 2021, when Cafe Pharoah won the February Stakes.

In March 2017, Coolmore announced that American Pharoah would shuttle to stand at Coolmore Australia for the breeding season in the southern hemisphere, which begins in July, then return to America at the end of the year. He shuttled to Australia for five years. His first winner in Australia was the colt Head of State, who won a race in 2021. In 2024, his son Riff Rocket won three Group 1 events and became just the fourth horse to complete the Victoria Derby and Australian Derby double, the distance of both events close to his sire's victory in the Grade 1 Belmont Stakes. American Pharoah did not shuttle to Australia in 2022.

American Pharoah continued to stand at Ashford Stud in Kentucky for a fee of $50,000 until late 2025. He was shuttled to the Shizunai Stallion Station in Japan for the 2026 season, and was set to return to Kentucky in July 2026. However, his contract has since been extended by another year.

== Legacy and honors ==
In 2016, Oaklawn president Charles Cella commissioned Philadelphia sculptor James Peniston to create a life-sized bronze sculpture of American Pharoah and jockey Victor Espinoza. In preparation for sculpting, Peniston visited and photographed the horse with the permission of trainer Bob Baffert. The sculpture was cast in 2017 at Laran Bronze outside Philadelphia and installed on January 11, 2018, at the Oaklawn racetrack in Hot Springs, Arkansas. One newspaper wrote, "James Peniston's full-scale, full-stride statue of American Pharoah [is] a perfect duplicate — down to its bulging muscles and veins — of the 3-year-old colt as he carried himself and jockey Victor Espinoza in the winter and spring of 2015 toward Triple Crown glory."

In 2021, American Pharoah was inducted into the US Horse Racing Hall of Fame.

== Pedigree ==
American Pharoah's pedigree includes horses noted for success at classic race distances on his sire's side and those with speed on his dam's side.

Pedigree of American Pharoah, bay colt, 2012
Sire Pioneerof the Nile (USA) 2006	Empire Maker (USA); 2000	Unbridled	Fappiano
Sire Pioneerof the Nile (USA) 2006	Empire Maker (USA); 2000	Unbridled	Gana Facil
Sire Pioneerof the Nile (USA) 2006	Empire Maker (USA); 2000	Toussaud	El Gran Senor
Sire Pioneerof the Nile (USA) 2006	Empire Maker (USA); 2000	Toussaud	Image of Reality
Sire Pioneerof the Nile (USA) 2006	Star of Goshen (USA); 1994	Lord at War	General
Sire Pioneerof the Nile (USA) 2006	Star of Goshen (USA); 1994	Lord at War	Luna de Miel
Sire Pioneerof the Nile (USA) 2006	Star of Goshen (USA); 1994	Castle Eight	Key to the Kingdom
Sire Pioneerof the Nile (USA) 2006	Star of Goshen (USA); 1994	Castle Eight	Her Native
Dam Littleprincessemma (USA) 2006	Yankee Gentleman (USA); 1999	Storm Cat	Storm Bird
Dam Littleprincessemma (USA) 2006	Yankee Gentleman (USA); 1999	Storm Cat	Terlingua
Dam Littleprincessemma (USA) 2006	Yankee Gentleman (USA); 1999	Key Phrase	Flying Paster
Dam Littleprincessemma (USA) 2006	Yankee Gentleman (USA); 1999	Key Phrase	Sown
Dam Littleprincessemma (USA) 2006	Exclusive Rosette (USA); 1993	Ecliptical	Exclusive Native
Dam Littleprincessemma (USA) 2006	Exclusive Rosette (USA); 1993	Ecliptical	Minnetonka
Dam Littleprincessemma (USA) 2006	Exclusive Rosette (USA); 1993	Zetta Jet	Tri Jet
Dam Littleprincessemma (USA) 2006	Exclusive Rosette (USA); 1993	Zetta Jet	Queen Zetta (Family 14) (Note: Queen Zetta's fifth generation maternal grandam was Refugee III (foaled 1916); Refugee III's dam is recorded in the 1921 General Stud Book as Aliena (foaled 1903), out of Lady Wrangler. Aliena and Lady Wrangler are both members of Family 14, tracing their tail-female line back to The Oldfield Mare (circa 1695).)

== See also ==
- List of racehorses
