= Armstrong House (Citra, Florida) =

Historic house in Florida, United States

- U.S. National Register of Historic Places
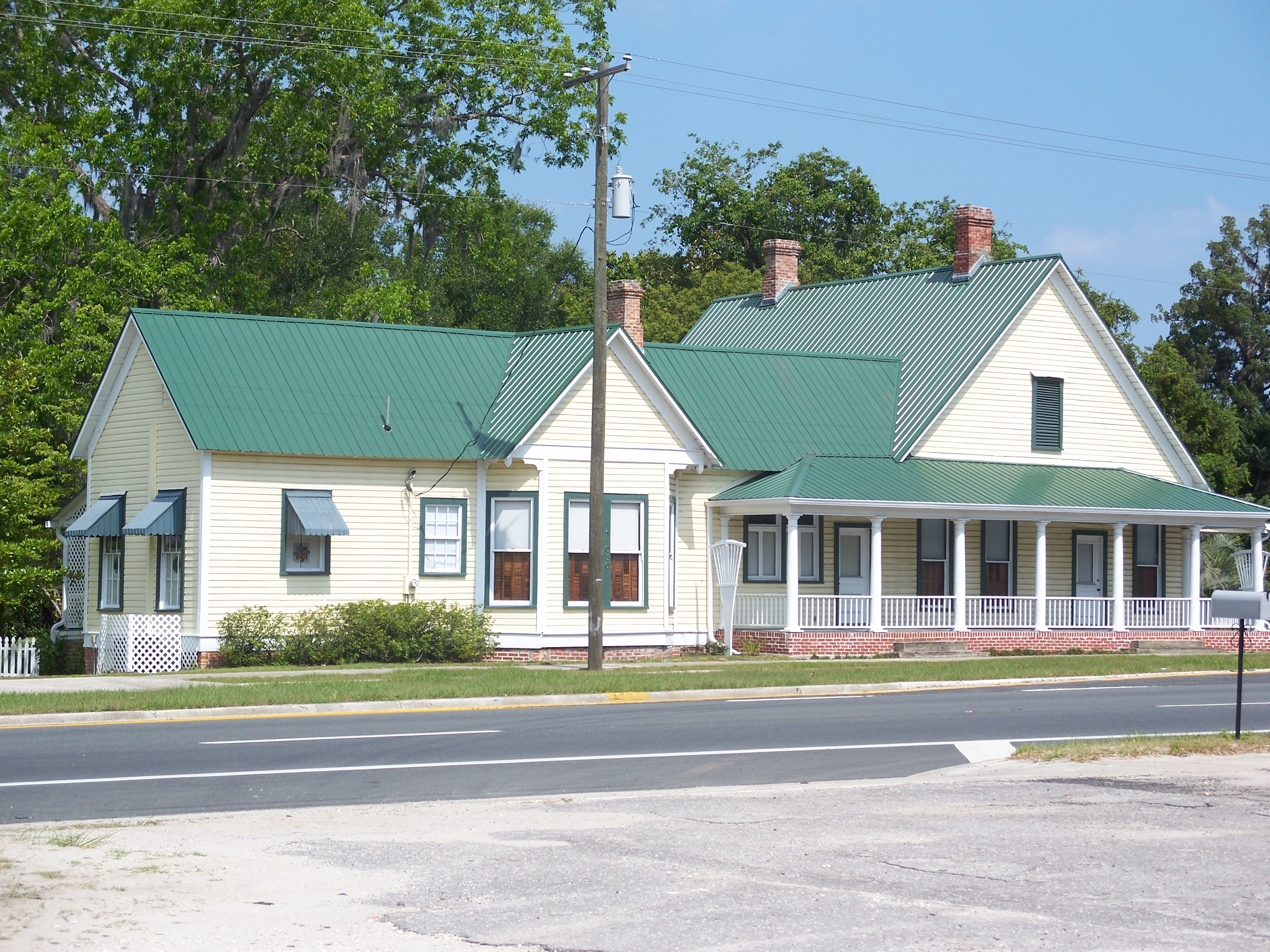

- Location within Florida
- Location: 18050 US 301 N
- Nearest city: Citra, Florida
- Coordinates: 29°24′44″N 82°6′38″W
- Area: 1.10 acres (0.45 ha)
- Built: 1901
- NRHP reference No.: 00000638
- Added to NRHP: June 9, 2000

The Armstrong House (also known as the Melton-Shands House) is a historic house located at 18050 US Highway 301 North in Citra, Florida. It is locally significant as an example of statewide and national trends in Frame Vernacular architecture at the time of its construction.

== Description and history ==
The house was built in 1901 in the Frame Vernacular style of architecture. Resting on a brick pier foundation, the asymmetrical shaped balloon frame-house exhibits common clapboard siding, and has four high-pitched gable roof elevations clad with metal pierced by four corbelled brick chimneys. It also features a porch and a bay window facing the street.

It was listed on the U.S. National Register of Historic Places on June 9, 2000.

== Gallery ==
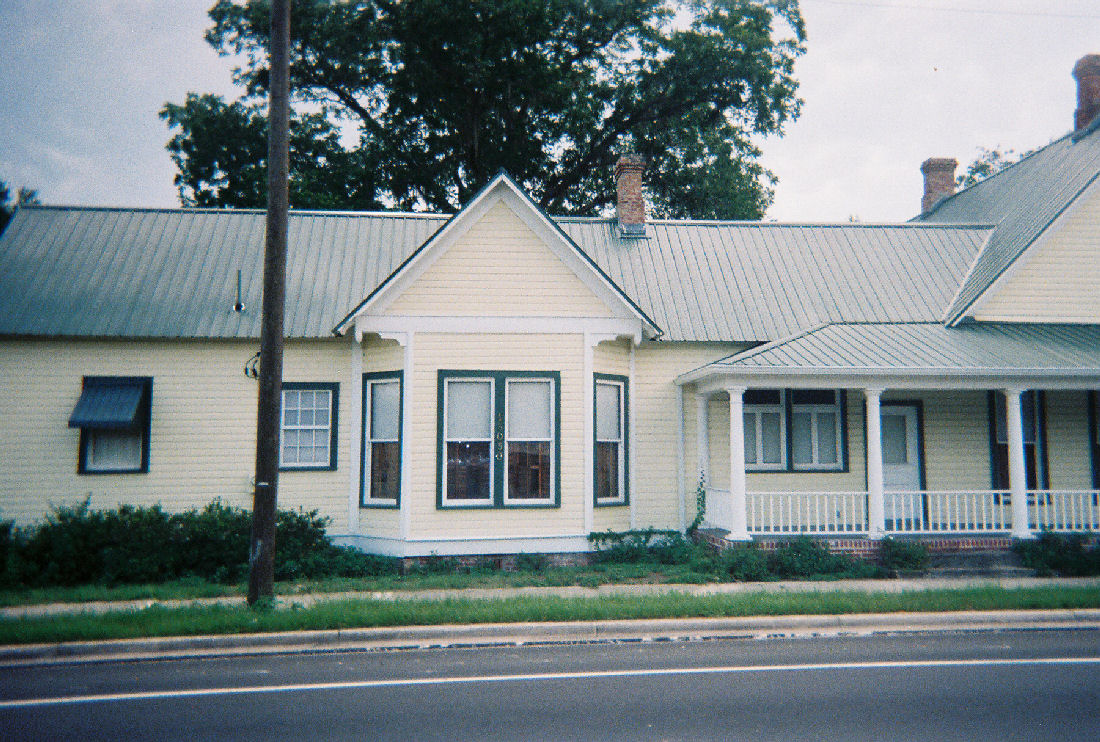

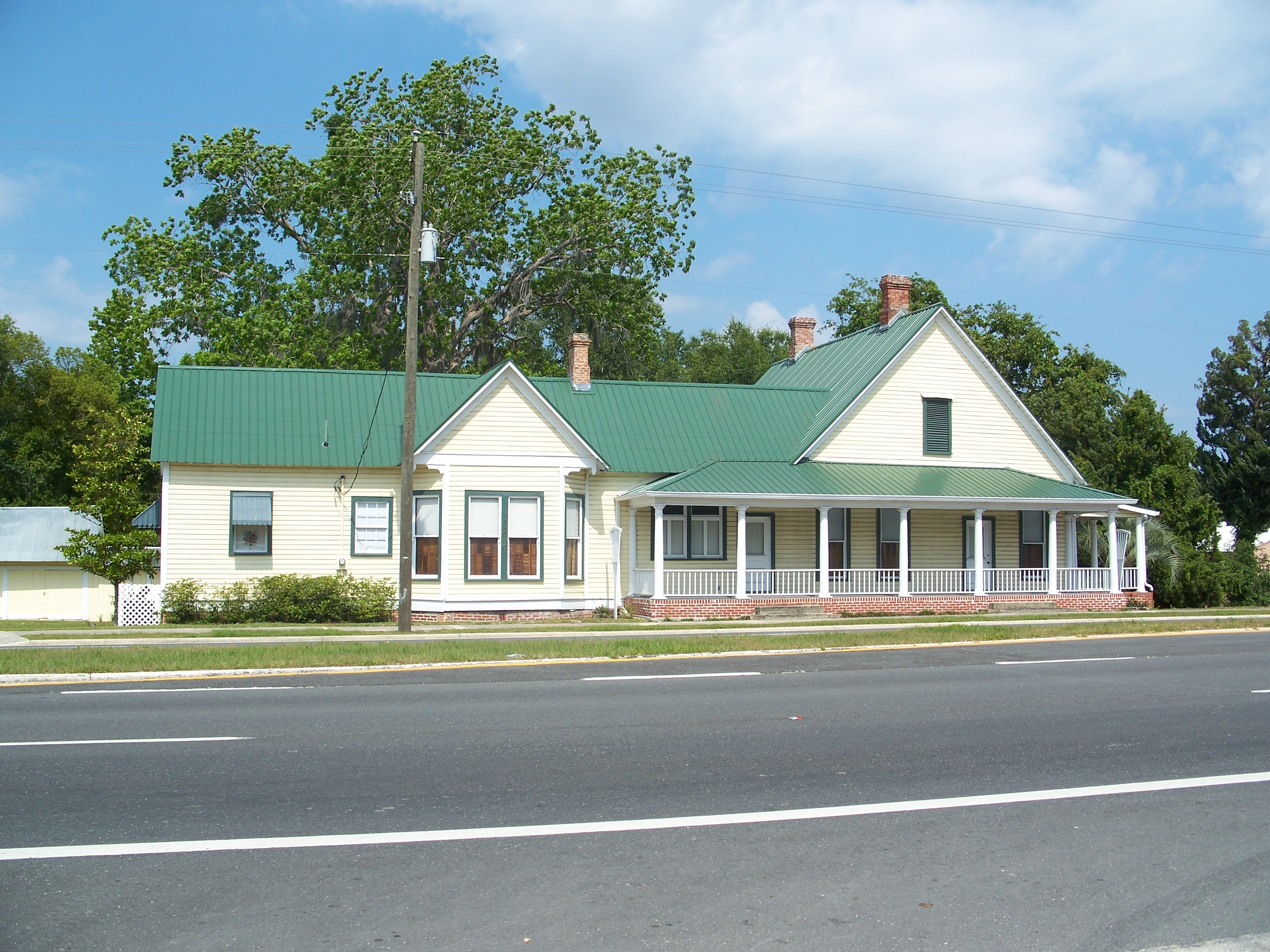
