= Littleprincessemma =

American-bred Thoroughbred racehorse

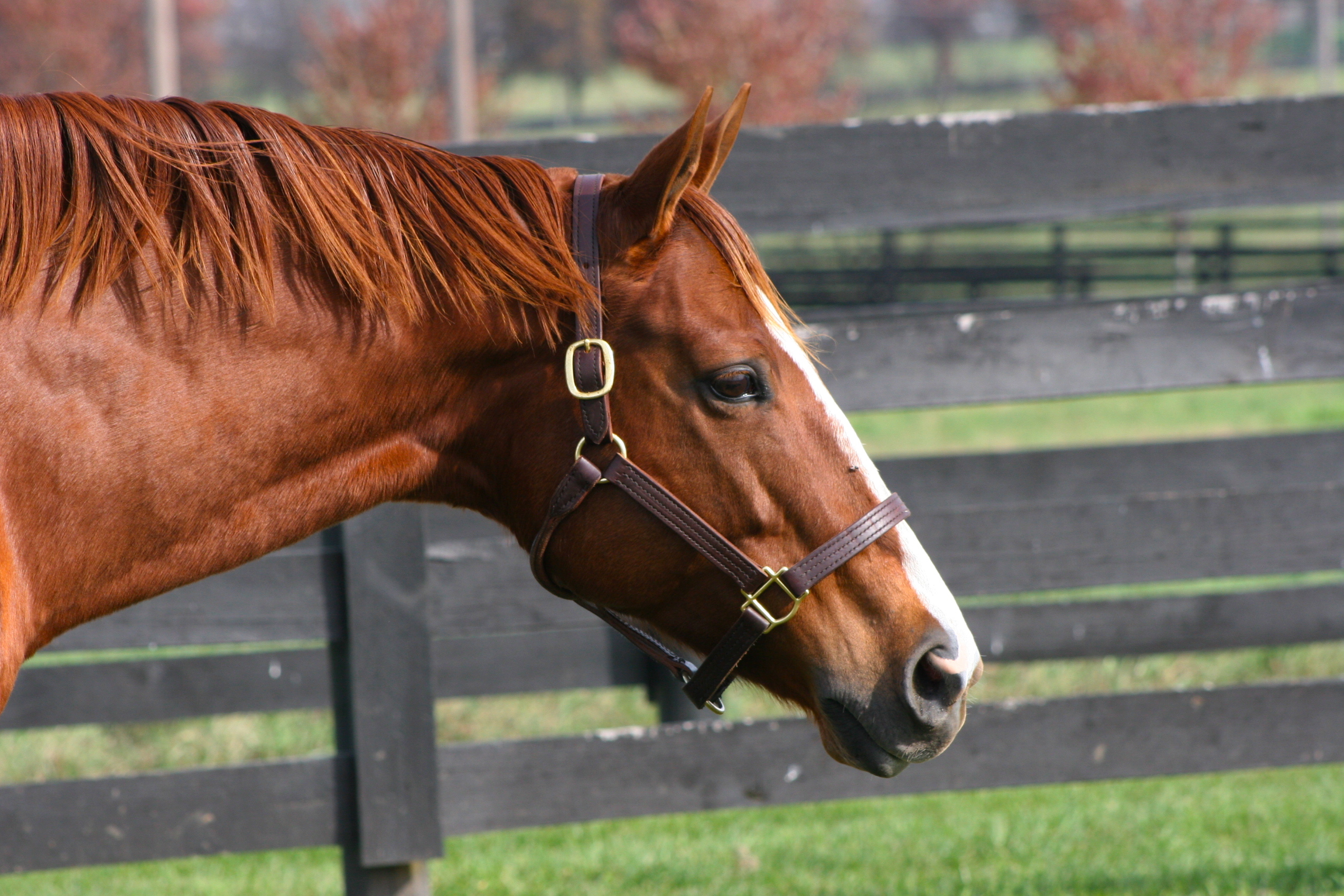
- Sire: Yankee Gentleman
- Grandsire: Storm Cat
- Dam: Exclusive Rosette
- Damsire: Ecliptic
- Sex: Mare
- Foaled: Feb 27, 2006
- Country: United States
- Color: Chestnut
- Breeder: Brereton C. Jones
- Owner: Summer Wind Farm; Ahmed Zayat
- Trainer: Steve Asmussen
- Record: 2: 0–0–0
- Earnings: $172

Awards
- Kentucky Broodmare of the Year (2015)

Littleprincessemma (foaled Feb 27, 2006) is a Thoroughbred mare who raced twice but is notable as the dam of the American Triple Crown-winning racehorse American Pharoah. Bred by Brereton C. Jones, she sold in 2006 as a weanling filly for $135,000 ($216,000 adjusted for inflation) and then the following year, as a yearling, she was purchased by Zayat Stables for $250,000 ($388,000 adjusted for inflation). She was named after Ahmed Zayat's daughter, Emma. She is a chestnut with a blaze on her face, a stocking on her left hind leg and a sock on her right hind leg.

== Racing career ==
Put into training with Steve Asmussen, she raced twice, once at Churchill Downs, finishing 6th, and once at Saratoga, finishing 12th, and retired due to injury.

== Breeding career ==
Initially retained as a broodmare for Zayat Stables, Littleprincessemma was bred but did not produce a foal in 2010. Her first foal and first winning offspring was Xixixi, a 2011 colt by Maimonides. Her next foal was American Pharoah, foaled in 2012, who was sired by Pioneerof the Nile. In the fall of 2011 she had been consigned for sale when she was in foal carrying American Pharoah but did not go through the sales ring.

She did not produce a foal in 2013, but was bred back to Pioneerof the Nile and produced a full sibling to American Pharoah, a filly, in 2014. The filly, named American Cleopatra, raced for the Zayats and had one win and one second in four career starts before being retired and bred to Uncle Mo, producing a filly later named Mo Emma. In 2019, she foaled a colt by Tapit. Then had two foals by Justify back to back in 2020 & 2021. American Cleopatra is grade one placed via her runner up effort in her second career start.

After American Cleopatra was weaned, Littleprincessemma, again in foal to Pioneerof the Nile, was sold at auction for $2,100,000.00 to Summer Wind Farm, owned by Jane and Frank Lyon Jr. At the time, American Pharoah was two years old. Emma is said to be one of Janes most prized horses, her and her foals are always the farm favorites. In February 2015, she foaled a colt who was later named Irish Pharoah. He was sold privately to Coolmore Stud and renamed St. Patrick's Day. Initially put into training with Bob Baffert, St. Patrick's Day was second in his first start and won his second, both races at Del Mar, before being transferred to Aiden O'Brien and relocated to Ireland. In Europe, St. Patrick's Day was winless but placed in two stakes races. In October 2019 it was announced that he would retire to stud at Journeyman Stallions in Florida for a 2020 fee of $5,000.

In 2016, Littleprincessemma foaled a filly by Tapit who was named Chasing Yesterday and retained by Jane Lyon to race in Summer Wind's colors. Chasing Yesterday got her name in part due to Frank Lyon's passing shortly before she was born, and in part due to American Pharoah's Triple Crown win. Chasing Yesterday, nicknamed "Little Emma", is her dam's most successful foal after American Pharoah, having won five of her seven starts including the G1 Starlet Stakes and three other stakes races under the training of Bob Baffert. Chasing Yesterday is quite special to Jane, as she was the first G1 winner for Summer Wind. Chasing Yesterday returned to Summer Wind in mid 2019 and was formally retired in September of that year. Despite leaving the racetrack before breeding season ended, Chasing Yesterday was given time to relax and was not bred in 2019. Her first trip to the breeding shed was a date with two time Horse of the Year Curlin, which produced a chestnut filly, who looks much like the whole family, in 2021. She was then bred to leading sire Into Mischief, which resulted in a blaze faced bay colt in 2022.

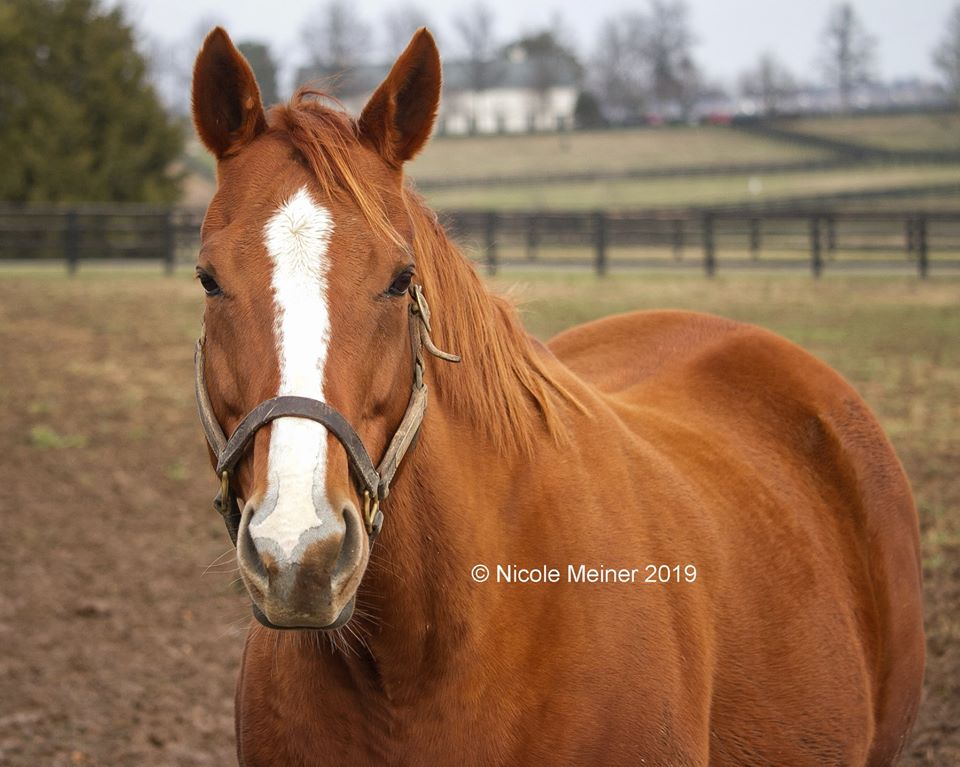
Littleprincessemma at Summer Wind Farm in Georgetown, Kentucky, in 2019

Bred back to Pioneerof the Nile, Littleprincessemma foaled a colt in 2017 who was later named Theprinceofthebes. Theprinceofthebes is the last full sibling to American Pharoah, as Emma was not bred to Pioneerof the Nile again before the stallion's untimely death on March 18, 2019. He is also the youngest full sibling to any thoroughbred Triple Crown winner, as Justify has no full siblings and Scat Daddy also died young in December 2015. Theprinceofthebes never raced and was retired from training back at Summer Wind.

On February 27, 2018, Littleprincessemma foaled another colt, a full brother to Chasing Yesterday who was named Triple Tap as both a reference to his half brother's success on the track and due to his birth occurring on the same day as both his sire (Tapit) and dam's birthday. As of February 2022, Triple Tap has raced four times with two wins and one third.

In April 2019, Emma foaled another filly by Tapit, later named Lasting Tribute, who will also be retained to race and eventually become a broodmare alongside her dam and full sister.

Littleprincessemma foaled a third filly by Tapit (and her fourth Tapit foal) on the evening of Easter Sunday, April 12, 2020. While her previous three Tapit offspring are chestnuts like their mother, Littleprincessemma '20 is a gray, like their sire. Shortly after the filly's birth, photographer Michele MacDonald announced that Lyon had named the filly Sunrise Service.

Emma was bred back to Tapit for 2021 and foaled a colt, a gray like her previous foal and their sire, who was named Seventh Son.

She was once again bred back to Tapit for 2022, which resulted in yet another blaze faced chestnut filly, much like Chasing Yesterday, Lasting Tribute, and Emma herself.

In 2023, she was set to be bred to Flightline.
