= Al-Balagh al-Usbuʿi (magazine) =

Political and literary magazine in Cairo, Egypt (1926–1930)

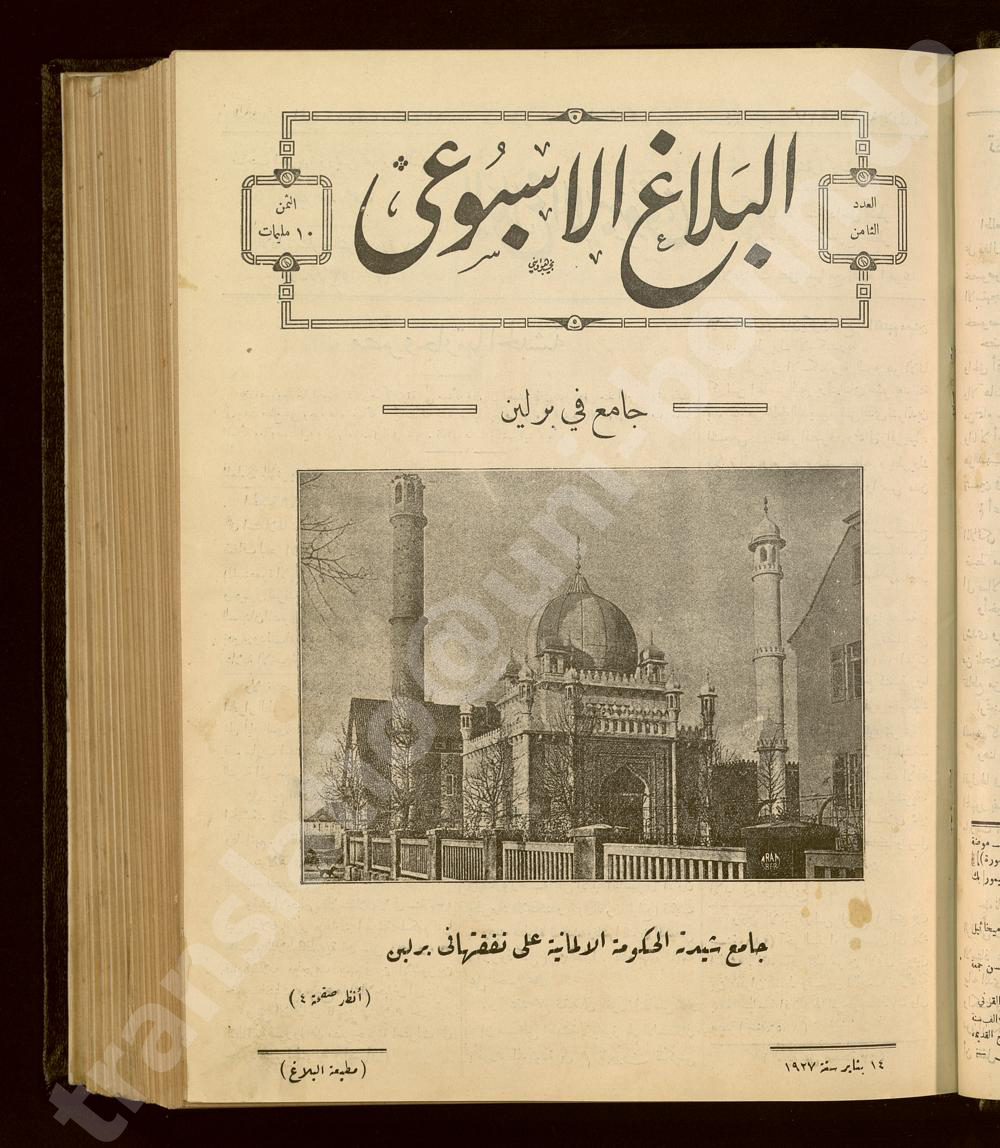
- Categories: Political magazine Literary magazine
- Frequency: Weekly
- Publisher: Abdul Qadir Hamzah
- Founder: Abbas Mahmoud al-Aqqad
- Founded: 1926
- First issue: November 1926
- Final issue Number: 1930
- Country: Egypt
- Based in: Cairo
- Language: Arabic
- Website: al-Balagh al-Usbuʿi

The Arabic-language journal Al-Balagh al-Usbuʿi (Arabic: البلاغ الاسبوعی; DMG: al-Balāġ al-Usbūʿī; English: "The Weekly News") was published weekly in Cairo, Egypt, between 1926 and 1930. It was the weekly edition of the newspaper Al Balagh. The first issue of the journal appeared in November 1926.

Four volumes with a total of 150 editions were published. Abbas Mahmoud al-Aqqad (1889-1964), the founder, was a well-known Egyptian writer, poet, philosopher and historian who appointed Abdul Qadir Hamzah as editor of the journal. In addition to critical political articles, numerous poems and prose were published in the magazine. Among well-known authors Mohammed Abd al-Mu'ti al-Hamshari (1908-1938) gained popularity through his poetry. Nabawiyya Mousa Badawia (1886-1951), a teacher and pioneer among Egyptian women's rights activists of the 20th century, designed a special page for women with feminist themes and discourses of Egypt from that time.

Al-Balagh al-Usbuʿi was also regarded as a supporter of the Wafd Party, therefore its publication was probably discontinued in 1930.
