= Majallat Al Azhar =

Islamic magazine in Egypt

- Former editors: Ahmad Hasan Al Zayyat
- Categories: Islamic magazine
- Frequency: Monthly
- Founded: 1931
- Country: Egypt
- Based in: Cairo
- Language: Arabic
- ISSN: 1110-4945
- OCLC: 1538085

Majallat Al Azhar (Arabic: مجلة الأزهر آذار; Journal of Al Azhar) is an Islamic publication of Al Azhar University in Cairo, Egypt, which has existed since 1931.

== History and profile ==
The magazine was launched in 1931 under the title Nur Al Islam as a monthly publication. It was renamed Majallat Al Azhar in 1935. The publisher is owned by the Al Azhar University, and the headquarters is in Cairo.

Majallat Al Azhar was one of the publications which opposed the reforms in the 1950s. In the 1960s its editor was Ahmad Hasan Al Zayyat. Mahmud Shaltut was one of the contributors of Majalla Al Azhar whose fatwas were published in the magazine. In the special issue of Majalla Al Azhar dated 1978 to celebrate Al Azhar University's thousand years of establishment Yusuf Al Qaradawi was the major contributor.
