= Citra Methodist Episcopal Church-South =

Historic church in Florida, United States

- U.S. National Register of Historic Places
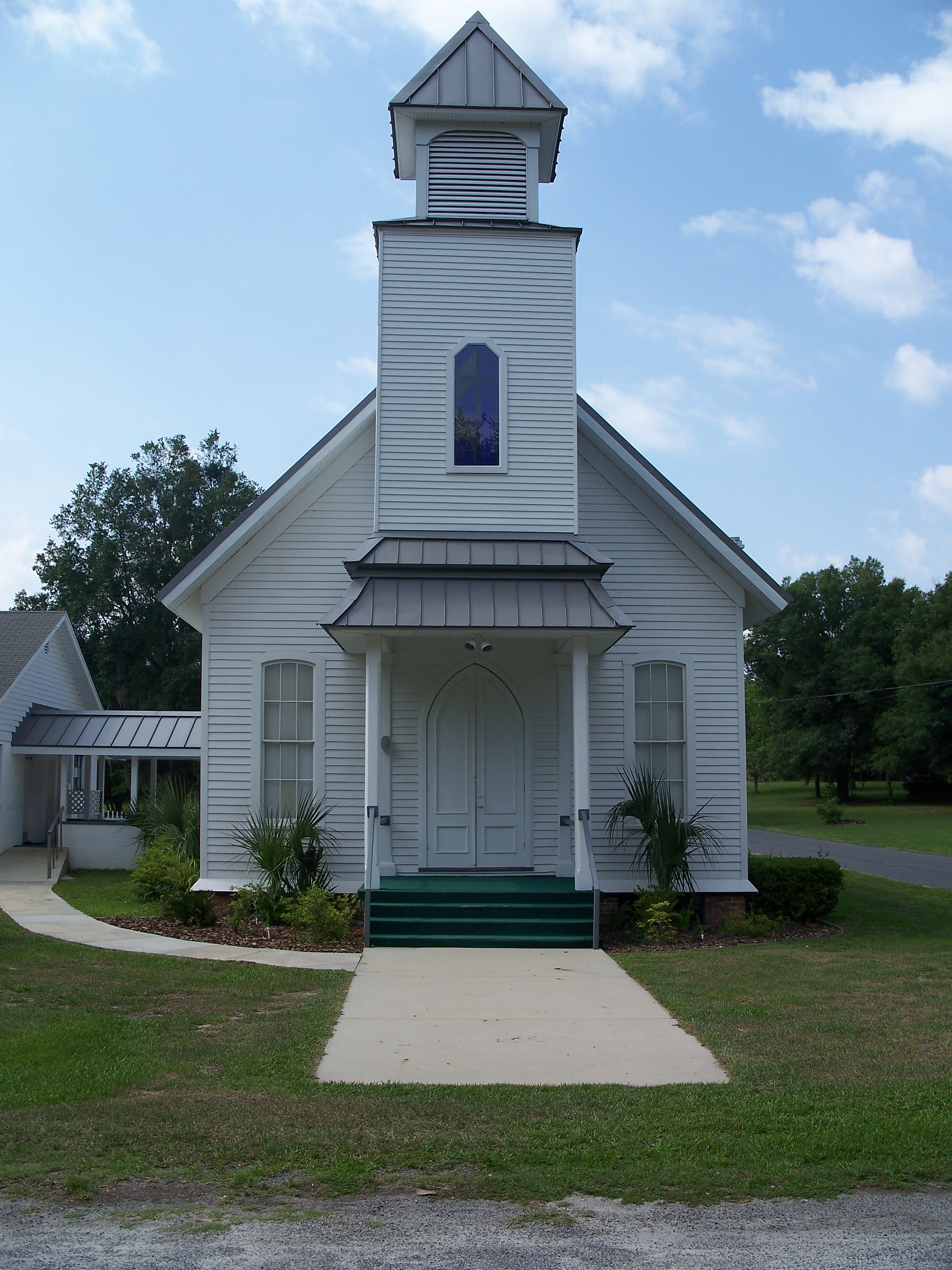

- Location within Florida Location within the United States
- Location: Citra, Florida
- Coordinates: 29°24′40″N 82°6′51″W
- NRHP reference No.: 98000177
- Added to NRHP: March 5, 1998

The Citra Methodist Episcopal Church-South (also known as Citra United Methodist Church) is a historic church in Citra, Florida. It is located at 2010 NE 180th Street. On March 5, 1998, it was added to the U.S. National Register of Historic Places.
