= Citra, Florida =

Unincorporated community in Florida, US

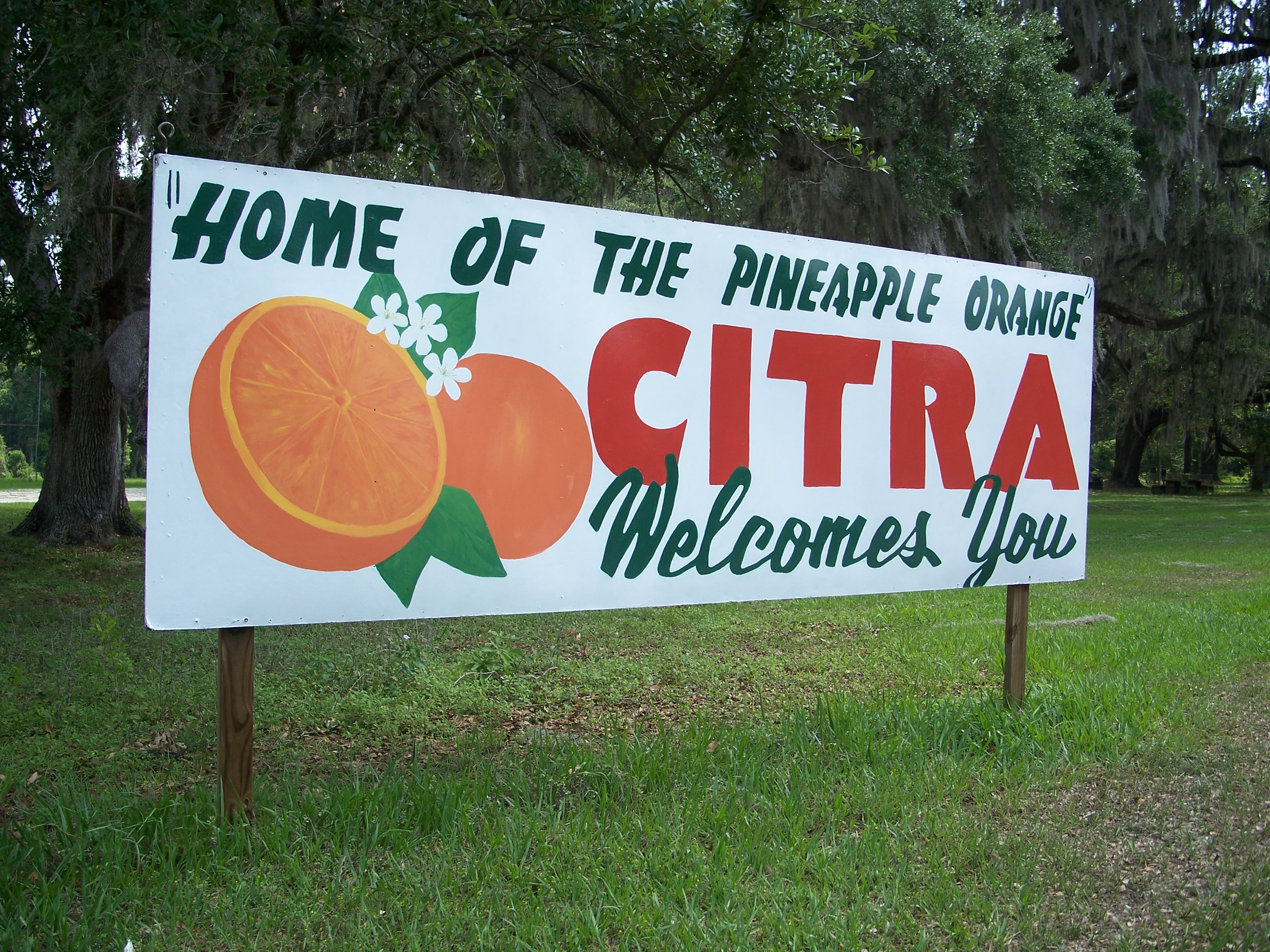
Welcome sign, off U.S. 301 in Citra

Citra is an unincorporated community in Marion County, Florida, United States. The community is part of the Ocala Metropolitan Statistical Area. Citra is known as the home of the pineapple orange, (originally called the hickory orange) a name coined by James B. Owens in 1883 for an orange with an aroma reminiscent of a pineapple.

== History ==
Citra was founded in 1881 in a citrus-growing district. A post office has been in operation in town since 1881.

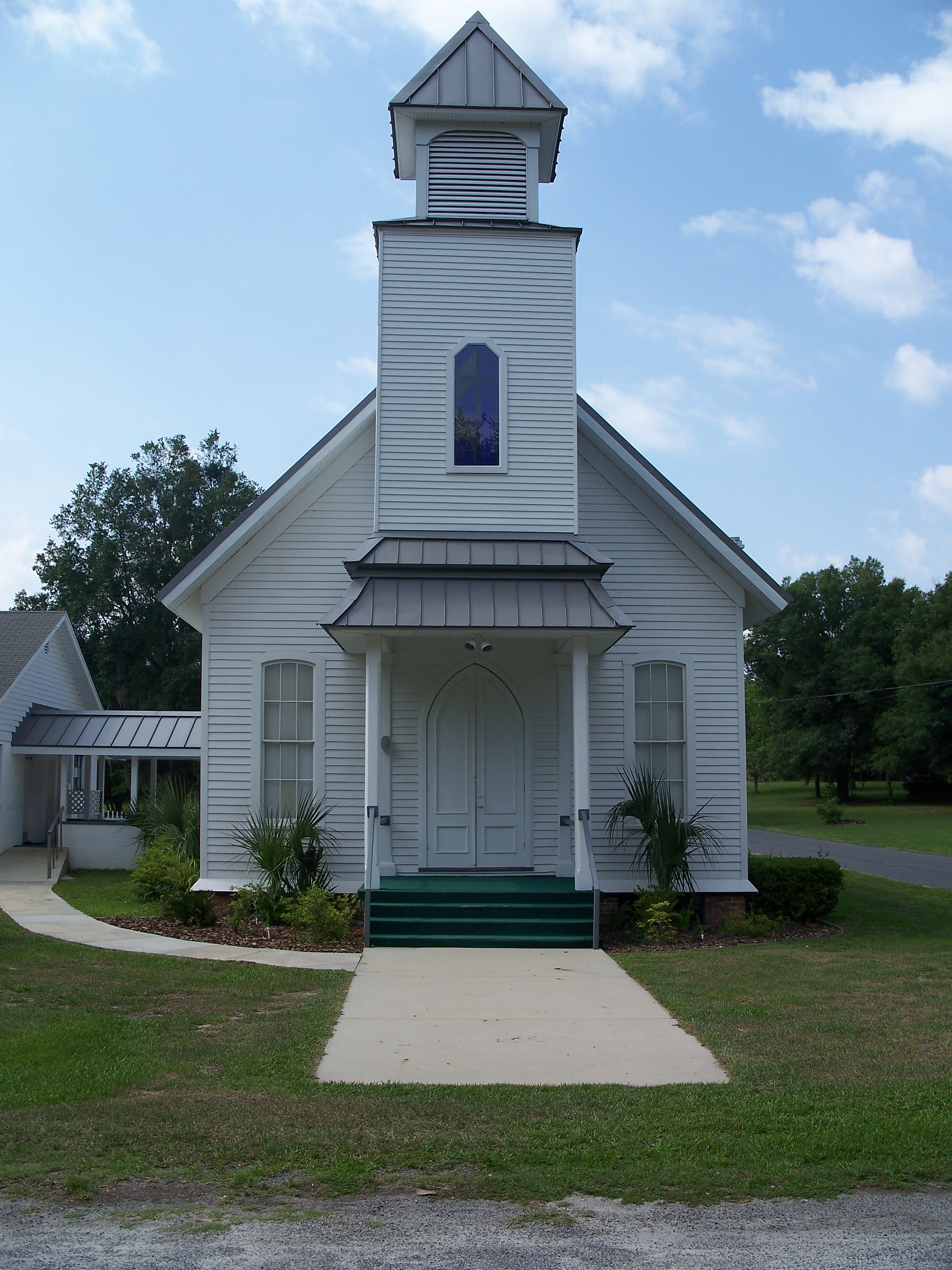
The historic Citra Methodist Episcopal Church

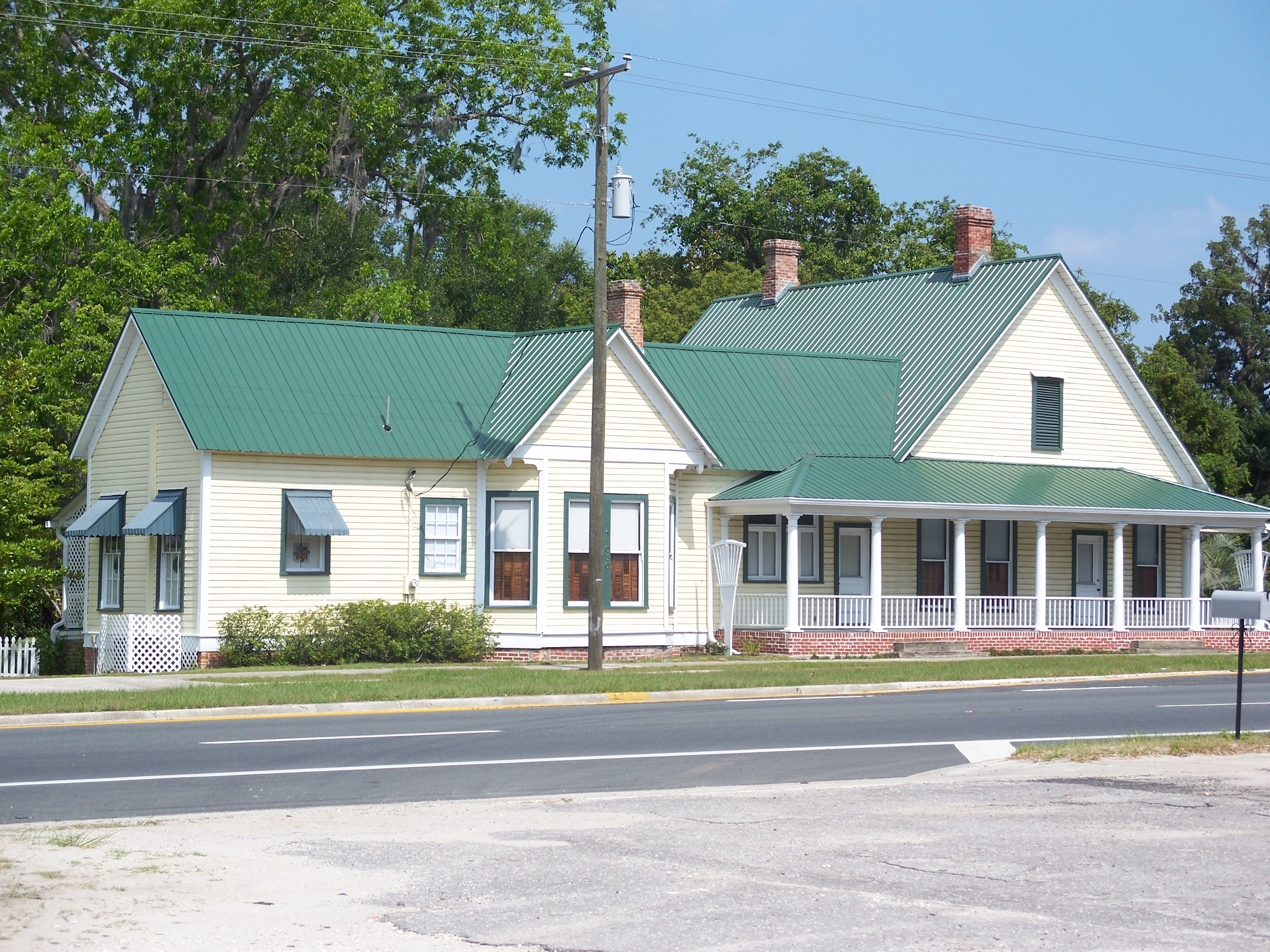
The historic Armstrong House

Citra has two buildings on the National Register of Historic Places: The Citra Methodist Episcopal Church and the Armstrong House. It is home to a University of Florida Institute of Food and Agricultural Sciences plant research facility, being expanded with a donation from Canadian billionaire Frank Stronach. Citra is in a region of Florida immortalized in the writings of Marjorie Kinnan Rawlings who lived northwest of Citra at Cross Creek in Alachua County.

== Geography ==
Citra is located at 29°24′42″N 82°06′36″W.

== Notable person ==
Popular tenor James Melton grew up in Citra.
