= Arrissalah =

Weekly literary magazine in Egypt (1933–1953)

- Editor: Ahmad Hasan al-Zayyat
- Categories: Literature, poetry, social issues
- Frequency: Biweekly; Weekly
- First issue: 15 January 1933
- Final issue Number: 23 February 1953; 1025
- Country: Egypt
- Based in: Abdeen, Cairo
- Language: Arabic

Arrissalah (Arabic: الرسالة Ar-Risala: the message, or مجلة الرسالة Ar-Risala Magazine) was an Arabic-language weekly cultural magazine for literature, science, and art published in Cairo from 1933 to 1953. It has been described as "the most important intellectual weekly in the 1930s Egypt and the Arab world."

== History and profile ==
The first issue of Arrissalah appeared in January 1933. It was published by Dar Arrissalah and owned and edited by Ahmad Hasan al-Zayyat. Muhammad Farid Abu Hadid was instrumental in the establishment of the magazine. It consisted of 86 pages printed on A4-sized paper. Arrissalah started as a biweekly publication, but became a weekly later.

The magazine featured the work of prominent writers such as Sayyid Qutb, Ahmad Amin, Muhammad Farid Abu Hadid, Ahmad Zaki Pasha, Mustafa 'Abd al-Raziq, Mostafa Saadeq Al-Rafe'ie, Taha Hussein, Mahmoud Mohamed Shaker, and Aboul-Qacem Echebbi.
