= Al Balagh =

Egyptian newspaper

- Founder(s): Abdul Qadir Hamzah
- Founded: 28 June 1923
- Language: Arabic
- Headquarters: Cairo
- Country: Egypt

Al Balagh (Arabic: البلاغ "The Report") is a newspaper that has been in circulation since 1923 with some interruptions. The paper is headquartered in Cairo, Egypt.

== History and profile ==
Al Balagh was launched by Abdul Qadir Hamzah in Cairo in 1923. He started the paper shortly after the suspension of his previous publication, a newspaper entitled Al Ahali. The first issue of Al Balagh appeared on 28 June 1923. The publisher is a company with the same name. Hamzah also served as the editor-in-chief of the paper.

Until 1937 the paper was close to the Wafd Party. In the early 1930s many well-known political figures published articles in Al Balagh such as Abdul Rahman Azzam, Ibrahim Al Mazini and Zaki Mubarak. These articles were mainly about the collaboration between Egypt and other Arab countries and about the ingredients, i.e. Egyptianness and Arabness, of the Egyptian nationalism. Abdul Qadir Hamzah also published articles on these topics in the paper. During the Arab revolt in Palestine in 1936 Al Balagh was among the Egyptian media outlets which frequently published reports of attacks by British soldiers and Jewish radicals to the mosques in Palestine. These publications, namely Al Ahram, Al Jihad, Kawkab and Al Sharq, contained news about the Zionist conspiracy to revive the Israelite kingdom and to restore the Solomon's Temple on the ruins of Al Aqsa mosque.

The major rival of Al Balagh was Al Siyasa which was the media outlet of the Liberal Constitutional Party, and the rivalry between them continued until 1951 when the latter ceased publication. Both papers launched a weekly edition in 1926. That of Al Balagh was entitled Al Balagh Al Usbuʿi which was started in November that year.
