= Ahmad Hasan al-Zayyat =

Egyptian political writer (1885–1968)

Ahmed Hasan al-Zayyat
- أحمد حسن الزيات
- Born: 4 February 1885; Kafr Demira, Talkha, Egypt
- Died: 12 May 1968 (aged 83)
- Education: Al-Azhar University
- Occupations: Writer; Journalist

Ahmad Hasan al-Zayyat (Arabic: أحمد حسن الزيات) was an influential Egyptian political writer and intellectual who established the Egyptian literary magazine Arrissalah, which is described as "the most important intellectual weekly in 1930s Egypt and the Arab world." Born in the village of Kafr Demira, Talkha, into what was then a peasant family, al-Zayyat studied at Al-Azhar University before taking up legal studies in Cairo and Paris. He taught Arabic literature at American University in Cairo, and for three years in Baghdad, before founding Arrissalah in 1933. In the 1960s he served as the editor of Majallat Al Azhar, monthly publication of Al Azhar University.

He sharply criticized Nazism and the ideology's racist views.
