= 2015 Road to the Kentucky Derby =

The 2015 Road to the Kentucky Derby was a point system by which horses qualified for the 2015 Kentucky Derby. It consisted of 35 races, 19 races for the Kentucky Derby Prep Season and 16 races for the Kentucky Derby Championship Season.

== Standings ==
Updated April 29, 2015.

Rank	Horse	Points	Earnings	Trainer	Owner	References
1	International Star	171	$940,979	Mike Maker	Ramsey, Kenneth L. and Sarah K.	
2	Dortmund	170	$1,230,000	Bob Baffert	Kaleem Shah, Inc.	
3	Carpe Diem	164	$1,470,000	Todd Pletcher	Winstar Farm LLC & Stonestreet Stables LLC	
**4**	**American Pharoah**	**160**	**$1,410,000**	**Bob Baffert**	**Zayat Stables, LLC**	
5	Frosted	113	$766,200	Kiaran McLaughlin	Godolphin Racing LLC	
6	Mubtaahij	100	$1,400,000	Mike de Kock	Mohammed bin Khalifa Al Maktoum	
7	Materiality	100	$595,200	Todd Pletcher	Alto Racing, LLC	
8	El Kabeir	95	$710,792	John P. Terranova II	Zayat Stables, LLC	
9	Upstart	76	$807,680	Richard A. Violette Jr.	Ralph M. Evans	
10	Far Right	62	$585,906	Ron Moquett	LaPenta & Rosenblum	
11	Itsaknockout	60	$288,560	Todd Pletcher	Starlight Racing (Wolf/Lucarelli)	
12	Firing Line	58	$530,000	Simon Callaghan	Arnold Zetcher LLC	
13	Danzig Moon	45	$217,500	Mark Casse	John C. Oxley	
14	War Story	44	$195,000	Tom Amoss	Christopher T. Dunn & Loooch Racing Stables, Inc.	
15	Tencendur	41	$214,500	George Weaver	Philip S. Birsh	
16	Stanford	40	$150,800	Todd Pletcher	Stonestreet Stables LLC	
17	Mr. Z	34	$625,826	D. Wayne Lukas	Zayat Stables, LLC	
18	Ocho Ocho Ocho	30	$760,250	James M. Cassidy	DP Racing, LLC	
19	Bolo	30	$214,980	Carla Gaines	Golden Pegasus Racing Inc. & Earle I. Mack	
---	Prospect Park	30	$130,000	Cliff Sise Jr.	Pam & Martin Wygod	
---	Madefromlucky	30	$200,000	Todd Pletcher	Cheyenne Stables LLC & Mac Nichol	
20	Keen Ice	22	$136,520	Dale Romans	Donegal Racing	
---	Daredevil	20	$339,600	Todd Pletcher	Let's Go Stable & WinStar Farm LLC	
---	Tiz Shea D	20	$110,000	William I. Mott	Wachtel Stable (Adam Wachtel), Brous Stable LLC (Nils Brous) & Gary Barber	
21	Frammento	20	$92,800	Nick Zito	Mossarosa	
---	Calculator	14	$180,000	Peter Miller	Richard C. Pell	
---	Classy Class	13	$85,000	Kiaran McLaughlin	Cheyenne Stables LLC	
---	Texas Red	12	$1,176,000	J. Keith Desormeaux	Brehm, Erich, Detmar, Wayne, Michaels, Lee, Desormeaux, et al.	
---	The Truth Or Else	11	$173,500	Kenneth G. McPeek	Harold Lerner LLC	
---	Leave the Light On	10	$240,000	Chad Brown	Klaravich Stables, Inc. and Lawrence, William H.	
---	Far From Over	10	$150,000	Todd Pletcher	Black Rock Thoroughbreds, LLP	
---	Pain and Misery	10	$145,350	Henry Dominguez	Black Gold Racing	
24	Metaboss	10	$136,450	Jeffrey L. Bonde	M.J. Arndt, S.M. McFetridge, D. Preiss, M. Metanovic & C. Azcarate	
---	Lucky Player	10	$97,831	Steve Asmussen	Jerry Durant	
---	Divining Rod	10	$75,000	Arnaud Delacour	Lael Stables (Roy & Gretchen Jackson)	
25	Firespike	10	$51,816	Mike Maker	Skychai Racing LLC, Charles Kevin Warner & Sand Dollar Stable LLC	
---	Tiznow R J	7	$72,000	Steve Asmussen	Mike McCarty	
---	Lord Nelson	6	$228,571	Bob Baffert	Peachtree Stable (John Fort)	
---	Rock Shandy	6	$56,000	Peter Miller	Donegal Racing	
---	St. Joe Bay	6	$43,000	Peter Miller	Altamira Racing Stable & David A. Bernsen	
26	Toasting Master	5	$21,000	Dale Romans	West Point Thoroughbreds	
---	Task Force Glory	5	$29,625	Mike Maker	Ken & Sarah Ramsey	
---	Bayerd	4	$266,000	Steven Asmussen	Clark O. Brewster	
---	Cross the Line	4	$100,000	Jerry Hollendorfer	Hollendorfer, Todaro, Live Your Dream Racing Stable, Sigband et alia	
---	Nasa	4	$40,000	John Servis	Someday Farm	
---	Bluegrass Singer	2	$118,945	Marcus J. Vitali	Crossed Sabres Farm	
---	Hashtag Bourbon	2	$74,117	Kellyn Gorder	Bourbon Lane Stable	
---	Hollywood Critic	2	$35,528	Thomas Drury Jr.	Bruce Lunsford	
---	General Bellamy	2	$25,000	William I. Mott	Bach Stables LLC	
---	Eagle	2	$23,902	Neil J. Howard	William S. Farish III	
---	The Great War	1	$215,662	Wesley A. Ward	Michael Tabor, Derrick Smith, Susan Magnier & Joseph Allen LLC	
---	Private Prospect	1	$138,000	Michael Campbell	Mellon Patch Inc.	
---	Bench Warrant	1	$91,890	John Sadler	Doubledown Stables Inc.	
---	Danny Boy	1	$59,544	Dale Romans	Donegal Racing (Jerry Crawford)	
---	Juan and Bina	1	$40,330	Gustavo Delgado	Grupo 7C Racing Stable	
---	Another Lemon Drop	1	$25,500	Phil Bauer	Rigney Racing LLC (Richard Rigney)	
---	Tough Customer	1	$25,000	Wayne Catalano	Gary & Mary West	
---	Harmonic	1	$12,000	Jerry Hollendorfer	Awtrey, Hammond, Phillips Racing Partnership, Schumer et al.	
---	Hero Ten All	1	$9,250	Jeff Mullins	Edward K. Gaylord II	
---	Flashaway	1	$8,999	Mark Casse	John C. Oxley	
---	Pioneerof the West	2	$14,250	Mark Casse	John C. Oxley	
---	Ackeret	1	$73,000	Rudy Rodriguez	Pick Six Racing & Silver Streak Stable	
---	Saratoga Heater	1	$50,000	Albert Stall Jr.	P.R. Racing	
22	Tale of Verve	0	$54,640	Dallas Stewart	Charles E. Fipke	

- Entrants for Kentucky Derby in blue
- "Also eligible" for Kentucky Derby in green
- Sidelined/Inactive/No longer under Derby Consideration/Not Triple Crown nominated in gray
- Winner of Kentucky Derby in **bold**

== Prep season ==
Note: 1st=10 points; 2nd=4 points; 3rd=2 points; 4th=1 point

Race	Distance	Surface	Purse	Track	Date	1st	2nd	3rd	4th	Ref
Iroquois	1-1/16 miles	Dirt	$150,000	Churchill Downs	Sep 6 2014	Lucky Player	Bold Conquest	Hashtag Bourbon	Danny Boy	
FrontRunner	1-1/16 miles	Dirt	$250,000	Santa Anita	Sep 27 2014	American Pharoah	Calculator	Texas Red	Lord Nelson	
Champagne	1-mile	Dirt	$400,000	Belmont	Oct 4 2014	Daredevil	Upstart	The Truth Or Else	El Kabeir	
Breeders' Futurity	1-1/16 miles	Dirt	$400,000	Keeneland	Oct 4 2014	Carpe Diem	Mr. Z	Bold Conquest	Tough Customer	
Grey	1-1/16 miles	Synthetic	$150,000	Woodbine	Oct 5 2014	International Star	Conquest Typhoon	Hollywood Critic	Flashaway	
Breeders' Cup Juvenile	1-1/16 miles	Dirt	$2,000,000	Santa Anita	Nov 1 2014	Texas Red	Carpe Diem	Upstart	The Great War	
Delta Downs Jackpot	1-1/16 miles	Dirt	$1,000,000	Delta Downs	Nov 22 2014	Ocho Ocho Ocho	Mr. Z	Far Right	Saratoga Heater	
Remsen	1-1/8 miles	Dirt	$250,000	Aqueduct	Nov 29 2014	Leave the Light On	Frosted	Keen Ice	Classy Class	
Kentucky Jockey Club	1-1/16 miles	Dirt	$200,000	Churchill Downs	Nov 29 2014	El Kabeir	Imperia	Eagle	International Star	
Los Alamitos Futurity	1-1/16 miles	Dirt	$500,000	Los Alamitos	Dec 20 2014	Dortmund	Firing Line	Mr. Z	Bench Warrant	
Jerome	1-mile 70 yards	Dirt	$200,000	Aqueduct	Jan 3 2015	El Kabeir	Nasa	General Bellamy	Ackeret	
Sham	1-mile	Dirt	$100,000	Santa Anita	Jan 10 2015	Calculator	Rock Shandy	Pioneerof the West	St. Joe Bay	
Lecomte	1-mile 70 yards	Dirt	$200,000	Fair Grounds	Jan 17 2015	International Star	War Story	Tiznow R J	Another Lemon Drop	
Smarty Jones	1-mile	Dirt	$150,000	Oaklawn	Jan 19 2015	Far Right	Bayerd	Mr. Z	Private Prospect	
Holy Bull	1-1/16 miles	Dirt	$400,000	Gulfstream	Jan 24 2015	Upstart	Frosted	Bluegrass Singer	Juan and Bina	
Withers	1-1/16 miles	Dirt	$200,000	Aqueduct	Feb 7 2015	Far From Over	El Kabeir	Classy Class	Tencendur	
Robert B. Lewis	1-1/16 miles	Dirt	$200,000	Santa Anita	Feb 7 2015	Dortmund	Firing Line	Rock Shandy	Hero Ten All	
El Camino Real Derby	1-1/8 miles	Synthetic	$200,000	Golden Gate	Feb 14 2015	Metaboss	Cross the Line	Conquest Typhoon	Harmonic	
Southwest	1-1/16 miles	Dirt	$300,000	Oaklawn	Feb 22 2015	Far Right	The Truth Or Else	Mr. Z	Bold Conquest	

== Championship series ==
=== First leg of series ===
Note: 1st=50 points; 2nd=20 points; 3rd=10 points; 4th=5 points

Race	Distance	Surface	Purse	Track	Date	1st	2nd	3rd	4th	Ref
Fountain of Youth	1-1/16 miles	Dirt	$400,000	Gulfstream	Feb 21 2015	Itsaknockout	Upstart	Frammento	Frosted	
Risen Star Stakes	1-1/16 miles	Dirt	$400,000	Fair Grounds	Feb 21 2015	International Star	War Story	Keen Ice	St. Joe Bay	
Gotham Stakes	1-1/16 miles	Dirt	$400,000	Aqueduct	Mar 7 2015	El Kabeir	Tiz Shea D	Classy Class	Toasting Master	
San Felipe Stakes	1-1/16 miles	Dirt	$300,000	Santa Anita	Mar 7 2015	Dortmund	Prospect Park	Bolo	Lord Nelson	
Tampa Bay Derby	1-1/16 miles	Dirt	$350,000	Tampa Bay Downs	Mar 7 2015	Carpe Diem	Ami's Flatter	Divining Rod	Danzig Moon	
Rebel Stakes	1-1/16 miles	Dirt	$700,000	Oaklawn	Mar 14 2015	American Pharoah	Madefromlucky	Bold Conquest	The Truth Or Else	
Spiral Stakes	1-1/8 miles	Synthetic	$550,000	Turfway	Mar 21 2015	Dubai Sky	Conquest Typhoon	Firespike	Task Force Glory	
Sunland Derby	1-1/8 miles	Dirt	$800,000	Sunland	Mar 22 2015	Firing Line	Where's the Moon	Pain and Misery	Tiznow R J	

=== Second leg of series ===
Note: 1st=100 points; 2nd=40 points; 3rd=20 points; 4th=10 points

Race	Distance	Surface	Purse	Track	Date	1st	2nd	3rd	4th	Ref
UAE Derby	1-3/16 miles	Dirt	$2,000,000	Meydan	Mar 28 2015	Mubtaahij	Maftool	Golden Barows	Motaa	
Florida Derby	1-1/8 miles	Dirt	$1,000,000	Gulfstream	Mar 28 2015	Materiality	Upstart	Ami's Flatter	Itsaknockout	
Louisiana Derby	1-1/8 miles	Dirt	$1,000,000	Fair Grounds	Mar 28 2015	International Star	Stanford	War Story	Keen Ice	
Wood Memorial	1-1/8 miles	Dirt	$1,000,000	Aqueduct	Apr 4 2015	Frosted	Tencendur	El Kabeir	Daredevil	
Santa Anita Derby	1-1/8 miles	Dirt	$1,000,000	Santa Anita	Apr 4 2015	Dortmund	One Lucky Dane	Bolo	Prospect Peak	
Blue Grass Stakes	1-1/8 miles	Dirt	$1,000,000	Keeneland	Apr 4 2015	Carpe Diem	Danzig Moon	Ocho Ocho Ocho	Frammento	
Arkansas Derby	1-1/8 miles	Dirt	$1,000,000	Oaklawn Park	Apr 11 2015	American Pharoah	Far Right	Mr. Z	Madefromlucky	

"Wild Card"

Note: 1st=10 points; 2nd=4 points; 3rd=2 points; 4th=1 point

Race	Distance	Surface	Grade	Track	Date	1st	2nd	3rd	4th	Ref
Lexington	1-1/16 miles	Dirt	$250,000	Keeneland	Apr 11 2015	Divining Rod	Donworth	Fame and Power	Comfort	

== See also ==
- Road to the Kentucky Oaks
