= 2015 Preakness Stakes =

140th running of the Preakness Stakes

140th Preakness Stakes
- Preakness Stakes
- "The Middle Jewel of the Triple Crown" "The Run for the Black-Eyed Susans"
- Location: Pimlico Race Course, Baltimore, Maryland, United States
- Date: May 16, 2015
- Winning horse: American Pharoah
- Winning time: 1:58.46
- Final odds: 0.9-1
- Jockey: Victor Espinoza
- Trainer: Bob Baffert
- Owner: Zayat Stables, LLC
- Conditions: Sloppy
- Surface: Dirt
- Attendance: ▲131,680 (record at the time)

The 2015 Preakness Stakes, (run as the Xpressbet.com Preakness Stakes due to sponsorship), was the 140th running of the Preakness Stakes, promoted as the "middle jewel" of thoroughbred horse racing's traditional Triple Crown, held two weeks after the Kentucky Derby and three weeks before the Belmont Stakes. The race was held at the Pimlico Race Course in Baltimore, Maryland, on May 16, 2015, and was televised on NBC.

The event carried a $1,500,000 purse. The winner was American Pharoah, who won by seven lengths with jockey Victor Espinoza aboard. The win by American Pharoah set up an attempt for the Triple Crown for the second time in two years. The Maryland Jockey Club reported a track record total attendance of 131,680, the second highest attendance for American thoroughbred racing events in North America during 2015.

== Pre-race ==
Trainer Bob Baffert confirmed on May 3 that the 2015 Kentucky Derby winner American Pharoah came out of the Derby in good health and would be running the Preakness Stakes. The connections of the other top three finishers, Firing Line and Dortmund, announced they would challenge in the event.

Two contenders that did not appear in the Kentucky Derby were announced as probable entrants in late April: Grade III Lexington Stakes winner Divining Rod (owned by Lael Stable, trained by Arnaud Delacour, bred by Mr. and Mrs. Roy Jackson, ridden by jockey Julien Leparoux) and Listed Stakes Federico Tesio Stakes winner at Pimlico Bodhisattva (owned and trained by Jose Corrales, ridden by jockey Trevor McCarthy).

A week prior to the Preakness, other contenders were announced. These included fifth-placed Kentucky Derby competitor Danzig Moon and the also-eligible Tale of Verve who did not start in the Derby.

The draw for the race was held on May 13 and eight horses were entered. This was the smallest field in 15 years. American Pharoah drew the pole position and was installed as the morning line favorite. All entries carried 126 pounds.

== Race description ==
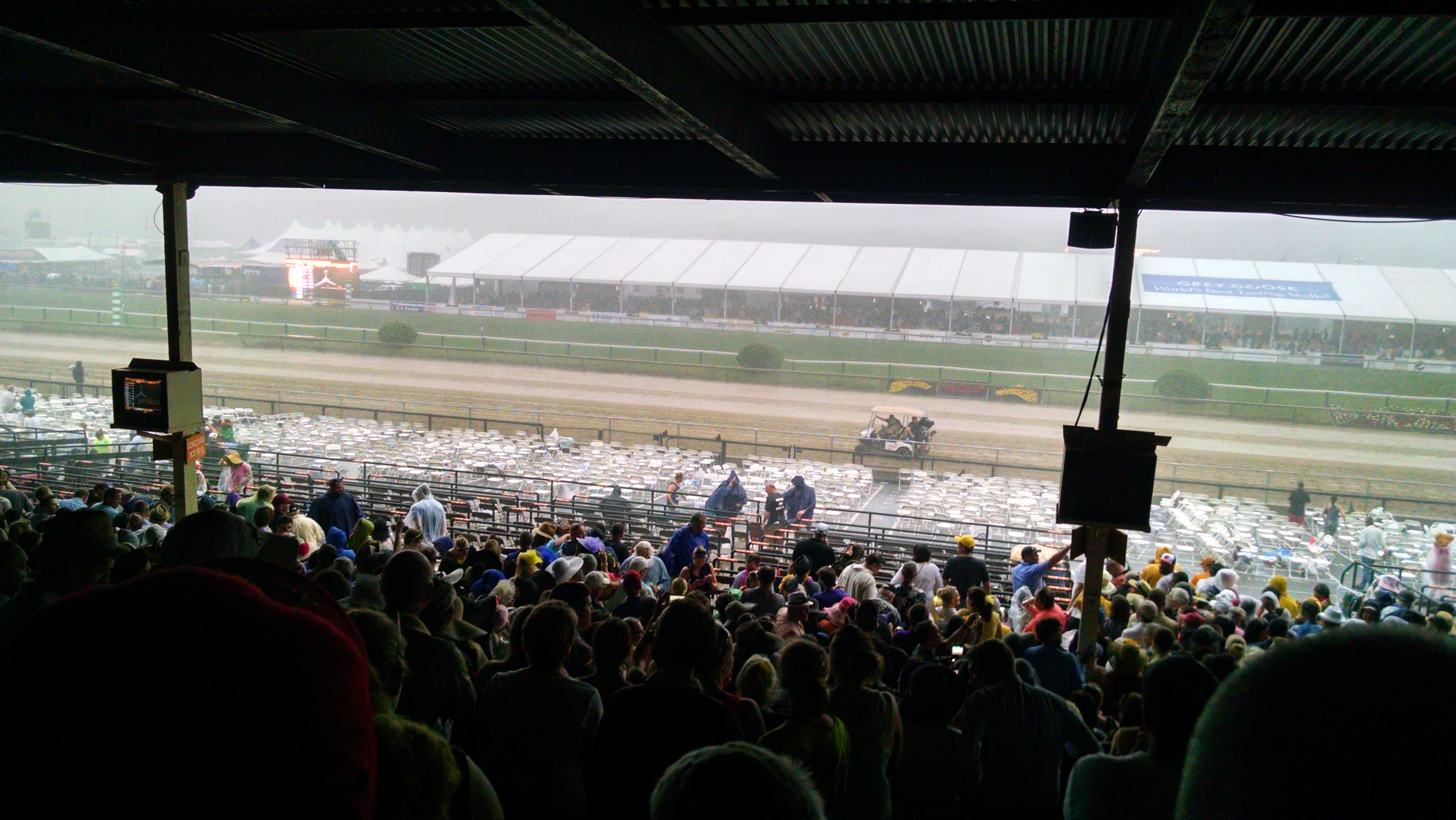
A thunderstorm before the race made the dirt track very muddy.

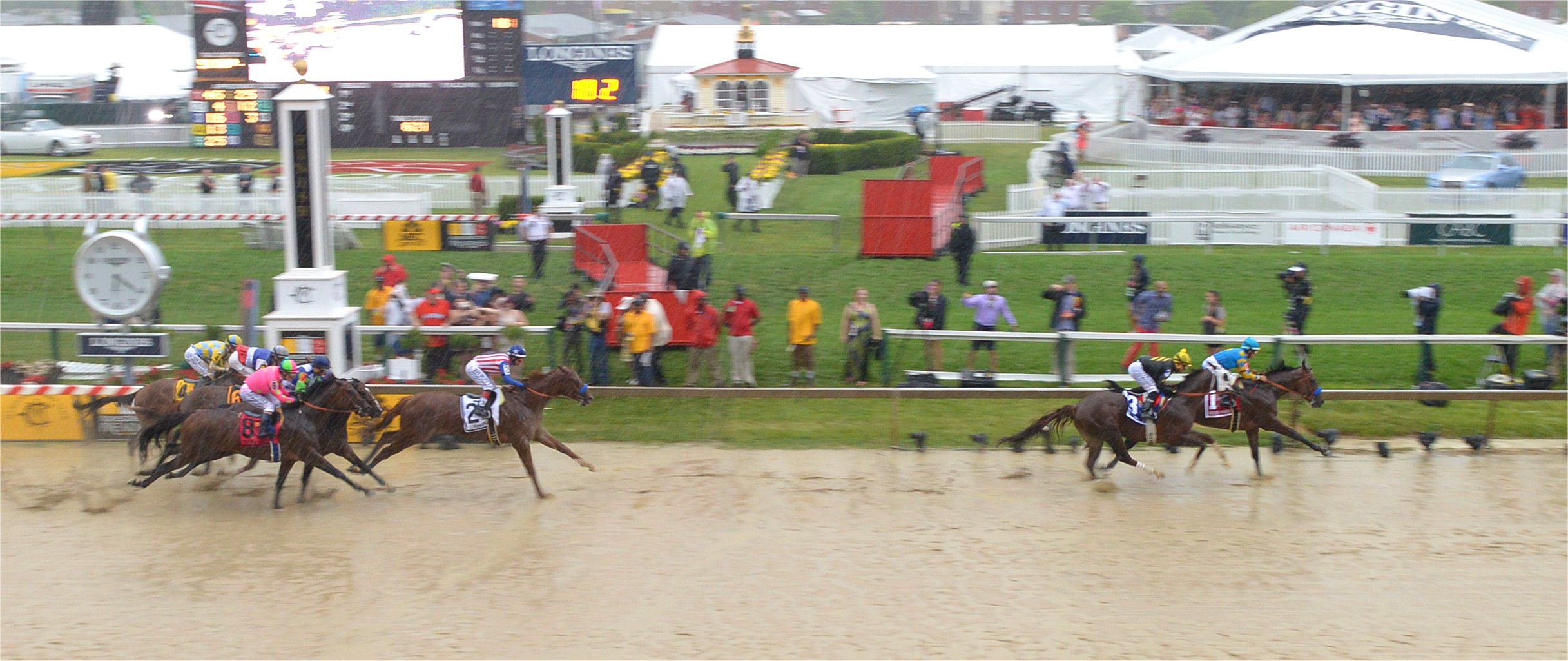
American Pharoah led throughout the race.

Immediately prior to post time, the skies opened up with a heavy downpour and thunder, changing the track conditions. The infield and grandstands were evacuated shortly before post time due to concerns about spectators being struck by lightning. The last time the Preakness had been run on a sloppy track was in 1983. American Pharoah was the only horse in the field to have previously won under such conditions, having won the Rebel Stakes on a sloppy track. He had the lead within the first quarter-mile and was challenged by Mr. Z early on, but held the lead on the inside throughout the race. He was challenged by Dortmund and then Divining Rod, but American Pharoah broke from the pack in the homestretch and won by seven lengths, as Tale of Verve made a strong rally to overtake Divining Rod to place. Firing Line slipped badly at the start and was eased in the stretch. Baffert commented on American Pharoah's race, "when I saw those ears go up [on the backside of the track], I thought, ‘Oh, yeah. Oh yeah.’” The win by American Pharoah set up an attempt for the Triple Crown for the second time in two years.

Due to weather conditions, the winning time of 1:58.46 was the slowest time since Hill Prince won in 1950 with a time of 1:59.20, and well off the record, set by Secretariat in 1973, of 1:53.00. The intensity of the rain was described in a post-race interview by Firing Line's rider, Gary Stevens, who explained that he weighed in at 120 pounds with equipment prior to the race, but was 135 pounds afterwards—without his helmet—and needed to empty water out of his riding boots following his weigh-out. Stevens added that the conditions made little difference to the outcome, however, saying "it would take a super horse to beat what might be a super horse in American Pharoah."

The city of Baltimore had been in a state of tension due to the death of Freddie Gray and surrounding civil disorder, and the Preakness was the state's major one-day sporting event, viewed as critical in the healing process for the city. Concerns existed because the track was only three miles from the Mondawmin Mall, where there had been riots. Pimlico's former vice-president for communications, Mike Gathagan, stated to ESPN, "I think sports, like ... the Preakness can help bring back normalcy...It could help start the healing process..." Maryland Governor Larry Hogan, in awarding the traditional Woodlawn Vase replica to American Pharoah's owner, Ahmed Zayat, stated, "It's a great day for Baltimore, a great day for Maryland." Comparing the 2015 Preakness to the post-9/11 home run of Mike Piazza, ESPN's Bob Ehalt wrote, "for that reason alone, this could be the biggest and most important Preakness ever."

== The full chart ==
Finish Position	Margin (lengths)	Post Position	Horse name	Jockey	Trainer	Owner	Morning Line Odds	Post Time Odds	Stakes
1	0	1	American Pharoah	Victor Espinoza	Bob Baffert	Zayat Stables, LLC	4-5	0.90	$900,000
2	7	5	Tale of Verve	Brian Hernandez, Jr.	Dallas Stewart	Charles E. Fipke	30-1	28.50	$300,000
3	8	7	Divining Rod	Javier Castellano	Arnaud Delacour	Lael Stables	12-1	12.60	$165,000
4	15 1/2	2	Dortmund	Martin Garcia	Bob Baffert	Kaleem Shah	7-2	4.50	$90,000
5	17 1/4	3	Mr. Z	Ramon A. Vazquez	D. Wayne Lukas	Calumet Farm	20-1	16.40	$45,000
6	18 1/4	4	Danzig Moon	Julien Leparoux	Mark E. Casse	John C. Oxley	15-1	13.40	
7	45	8	Firing Line	Gary Stevens	Simon Callaghan	Arnold Zetcher, LLC	4-1	3.00	
8	48 1/4	6	Bodhisattva	Trevor McCarthy	Jose Corrales	Jose Corrales	20-1	29.90	

- Winning owner and breeder: Zayat Stables, LLC
- Final time: 1:58.46
- Margins: 7 lengths, 1 length
- Track: Sloppy
- Attendance: 131,680

== Payout ==
The 140th Preakness payout schedule

Pgm	Horse	Win	Place	Show
1	American Pharoah	$3.80	$3.40	$2.80
5	Tale of Verve	–	$19.00	$8.80
7	Divining Rod	–	–	$5.20

- $2 Exacta (1-5) $124.40
- $2 Trifecta (1-5-7) $985.00
- $1 Superfecta (1-5-7-2) $1,906.90

== See also ==
- 2015 Kentucky Derby
- 2015 Belmont Stakes
