= 2015 World's Best Racehorse Rankings =

The 2015 World's Best Racehorse Rankings, sponsored by Longines was the 2015 edition of the World's Best Racehorse Rankings. It was an assessment of Thoroughbred racehorses issued by the International Federation of Horseracing Authorities (IFHA) in January 2016. It included horses aged three or older which competed in flat races during 2015. It was open to all horses irrespective of where they raced or were trained.

== Rankings for 2015 ==
- For a detailed guide to this table, see below.

Rank	Rating	Horse	Age	Sex	Trained	Pos.	Race	Surface	Dist.	Cat.
1	134	American Pharoah (USA)	3	C	USA	1st	Breeders' Cup Classic	Dirt	2,000	I
2	130	Golden Horn (GB)	3	C	GB	1st	Epsom Derby; Eclipse Stakes	Turf	2,400; 2,000	L I
3	126	Shared Belief (USA)	4	G	USA	1st	Santa Anita Handicap	Dirt	2,000	I
3	126	Treve (FR)	5	M	FR	1st	Prix Vermeille	Turf	2,400	L
5	125	Able Friend (AUS)	6	G	HK	1st	Queen's Silver Jubilee Cup; Premier Bowl	Turf	1,400; 1,200	M S
5	125	Solow (GB)	5	G	FR	1st	Dubai Turf	Turf	1,800	M
7	124	Order of St George (IRE)	3	C	IRE	1st	Irish St Leger	Turf	2,800	E
8	123	A Shin Hikari (JPN)	4	C	JPN	1st	Hong Kong Cup	Turf	2,000	I
8	123	Beholder (USA)	5	M	USA	1st	Pacific Classic	Dirt	2,000	I
8	123	Chautauqua (AUS)	5	G	AUS	1st	Manikato Stakes	Turf	1,200	S
8	123	Designs On Rome (IRE)	5	G	HK	1st	Centenary Vase	Turf	1,800	M
8	123	Dortmund (USA)	3	C	USA	1st	Native Diver Handicap	Dirt	1,800	M
8	123	Fascinating Rock (IRE)	4	C	IRE	1st	Champion Stakes	Turf	2,000	I
8	123	Firing Line (USA)	3	C	USA	2nd	Kentucky Derby	Dirt	2,000	I
8	123	Flintshire (GB)	5	H	FR	2nd	Prix de l'Arc de Triomphe	Turf	2,400	L
8	123	Free Eagle (IRE)	4	C	IRE	1st	Prince of Wales's Stakes	Turf	2,000	I
8	123	Honor Code (USA)	4	C	USA	1st	Whitney Stakes	Dirt	1,800	M
8	123	Jack Hobbs (GB)	3	C	GB	1st	Irish Derby	Turf	2,400	L
8	123	Lankan Rupee (AUS)	6	G	AUS	1st	Black Caviar Lightning	Turf	1,000	S
8	123	Muhaarar (GB)	3	C	GB	1st	British Champions Sprint Stakes	Turf	1,200	S
8	123	Winx (AUS)	4	F	AUS	1st	Cox Plate	Turf	2,040	I
22	122	Gleneagles (IRE)	3	C	GB	1st	2000 Guineas	Turf	1,600	M
22	122	Keen Ice (USA)	3	C	USA	1st	Travers Stakes	Dirt	2,000	I
22	122	Liam's Map (USA)	4	C	USA	1st	Breeders' Cup Dirt Mile	Dirt	1,600	M
22	122	New Bay (GB)	3	C	FR	3rd	Prix de l'Arc de Triomphe	Turf	2,400	L
22	122	The Grey Gatsby (IRE)	4	C	GB	2nd	Eclipse Stakes	Turf	2,000	I
27	121	Al Kazeem (GB)	7	H	GB	1st	Tattersalls Gold Cup	Turf	2,000	I
27	121	Blazing Speed (GB)	6	G	HK	1st	Queen Elizabeth II Cup	Turf	2,000	I
27	121	Brazen Beau (AUS)	4	C	AUS	1st	Newmarket Handicap	Turf	1,200	S
27	121	California Chrome (USA)	4	C	USA	2nd	San Antonio Handicap, Dubai World Cup	Dirt	1,800	M
27	121	Captain of All (SAF)	5	H	SAF	1st	Mercury Sprint	Turf	1,200	S
27	121	Cirrus des Aigles (FR)	9	G	FR	1st	Prix Ganay	Turf	2,100	I
27	121	Duramente (JPN)	3	C	JPN	1st	Tokyo Yushun	Turf	2,400	L
27	121	Highland Reel (IRE)	3	C	IRE	1st	Hong Kong Vase	Turf	2,400	L
27	121	Lovely Day (JPN)	5	H	JPN	1st	Kyoto Daishoten	Turf	2,400	L
27	121	Make Believe (GB)	3	C	FR	1st	Prix de la Forêt	Turf	1,400	M
27	121	Maurice (JPN)	4	C	JPN	1st	Hong Kong Mile	Turf	1,600	M
27	121	Mongolian Khan (AUS)	4	C	NZ	1st	Caulfield Cup	Turf	2,400	L
27	121	Postponed (IRE)	4	C	GB	1st	King George VI & Queen Elizabeth Stakes	Turf	2,400	L
27	121	Prince Bishop (IRE)	8	G	UAE	1st	Dubai World Cup	Dirt	2,000	I
27	121	Runhappy (USA)	3	C	USA	1st	Breeders' Cup Sprint	Dirt	1,200	S
42	120	Criterion (NZ)	5	H	AUS	1st 3rd	Queen Elizabeth Stakes; Melbourne Cup	Turf	2000; 3200	I E
42	120	Dolniya (FR)	4	F	FR	1st	Dubai Sheema Classic	Turf	2410	L
42	120	Eagle Top (FR)	4	C	GB	2nd	King George VI & Queen Elizabeth Stakes	Turf	2400	L
42	120	Effinex (USA)	4	C	USA	2nd	Breeders' Cup Classic	Dirt	2000	I
42	120	Erupt (IRE)	3	C	FR	1st	Grand Prix de Paris	Turf	2400	L
42	120	Found (IRE)	3	F	IRE	1st	Breeders' Cup Turf	Turf	2400	L
42	120	Frosted (USA)	3	C	USA	4th 2nd 1st	Kentucky Derby; Belmont Stakes; Pennsylvania Derby	Dirt	2000; 2400; 1800	I L M
42	120	Gold-Fun (IRE)	6	G	HK	1st	Jockey Club Sprint	Turf	1200	S
42	120	Gold Ship (JPN)	6	H	JPN	1st	Hanshin Daishoten	Turf	3000	E
42	120	Hi Happy (ARG)	3	C	ARG	1st	Gran Premio Carlos Pellegrini	Turf	2400	L
42	120	Mecca's Angel (IRE)	4	F	GB	1st	Nunthorpe Stakes	Turf	1000	S
42	120	Military Attack (IRE)	7	G	HK	3rd	Sha Tin Trophy	Turf	1600	M
42	120	Private Zone (CAN)	6	G	USA	1st	Forego Stakes	Dirt	1400	S
42	120	Snow Sky (GB)	4	C	GB	1st	Hardwicke Stakes	Turf	2400	L
42	120	Tepin (USA)	4	F	USA	1st	Breeders' Cup Mile	Turf	1600	M
42	120	Tonalist (USA)	4	C	USA	1st	Jockey Club Gold Cup	Dirt	2000	I
42	120	Vazirabad (FR)	3	G	FR	1st	Prix Royal Oak	Turf	3100	E

== Guide ==
A complete guide to the main table above.

Rank
A horse's position in the list, with the most highly rated at number 1. Each horse is ranked once according to its highest rating. Any lesser ratings for the same horse are not ranked.

Rating
A rating represents a weight value in pounds, with higher values given to horses which showed greater ability. It is judged that these weights would equalise the abilities of the horses if carried in a theoretical handicap race. The minimum rating required for inclusion is 115.

Horse
Each horse's name is followed by a suffix (from the IFHA's International Code of Suffixes) which indicates the country foaled.

Age
The age of the horse at the time it achieved its rating. The racing ages of all horses foaled in a particular part of the world increase simultaneously, regardless of the actual date of foaling.
Dates of age increase by location foaled
Northern Hemisphere	1 January
South America	1 July
Australia, New Zealand and South Africa	1 August

Sex
C	Colt	Ungelded male horse up to four-years-old
F	Filly	Female horse up to four-years-old
H	Horse	Ungelded male horse over four-years-old
M	Mare	Female horse over four-years-old
G	Gelding	Gelded male horse of any age

Trained
The country where the horse was trained at the time of the rating, abbreviated using the International Code of Suffixes.

Position
The horse's finishing position in the race shown. The actual finishing order can sometimes be amended following an inquiry or a disqualification.
=	Dead-heat
↑	Promoted from original finishing position
↓	Relegated from original finishing position

Race
The race (or one of the races) for which the horse achieved its rating. A defeated horse can be rated above its higher-placed opponents if it carried more weight.

Surface
The surface of the track on which the race was run, eg. turf or dirt. Synthetic surfaces are described as "artificial".

Distance
The distance of the race in metres. In some countries (eg. Canada, Great Britain, Ireland and the United States), the length of a race is usually expressed in miles and furlongs. These units have been converted to metres to allow for universal comparison.
Common conversions
5 furlongs	= 1,006 m	1 mile and 1½ furlongs	= 1,911 m
6 furlongs	= 1,207 m	1 mile and 2 furlongs	= 2,012 m
6½ furlongs	= 1,308 m	1 mile and 2½ furlongs	= 2,112 m
7 furlongs	= 1,408 m	1 mile and 3 furlongs	= 2,213 m
7½ furlongs	= 1,509 m	1 mile and 4 furlongs	= 2,414 m
1 mile	= 1,609 m	1 mile and 6 furlongs	= 2,816 m
1 mile and ½ furlong	= 1,710 m	2 miles	= 3,219 m
1 mile and 1 furlong	= 1,811 m	2 miles and 4 furlongs	= 4,023 m

Category
		Metres	Furlongs
S	Sprint	1,000–1,300; 1,000–1,599 (CAN / USA)	5–6.5; 5–7.99 (CAN / USA)
M	Mile	1,301–1,899; 1,600–1,899 (CAN / USA)	6.51–9.49; 8–9.49 (CAN / USA)
I	Intermediate	1,900–2,100	9.5–10.5
L	Long	2,101–2,700	10.51–13.5
E	Extended	2,701+	13.51+

International Code of Suffixes
The following countries have been represented in the WTR as foaling or training locations since the first edition in 2004.
ARG	Argentina	ITY	Italy
AUS	Australia	JPN	Japan
BRZ	Brazil	KSA	Saudi Arabia
CAN	Canada	NZ	New Zealand
CHI	Chile	SAF	South Africa
CZE	Czech Republic	SIN	Singapore
FR	France	SPA	Spain
GB	Great Britain	TUR	Turkey
GER	Germany	UAE	United Arab Emirates
HK	Hong Kong	USA	United States
HUN	Hungary	VEN	Venezuela
IRE	Ireland	ZIM	Zimbabwe

Shading
The shaded areas represent lesser ratings recorded by horses which were more highly rated in a different category. The IFHA publishes this information when the lower rating is the overall top performance in a particular category.
