= Dortmund (disambiguation) =

Dortmund is a city in Germany.

The word may also refer to:

- Borussia Dortmund, colloquially "Dortmund", the city's leading sport club
- Dortmund (horse), American Thoroughbred racehorse named after the sport club Dortmund
- Dortmund, the code word radioed by Germany to initiate the 1941 Operation Barbarossa campaign against the Soviet Union
