= 2015 Belmont Stakes =

American horse race

147th Belmont Stakes
- Belmont Stakes
- "The Test of the Champion"
- Location: Belmont Park; Elmont, New York, U.S.
- Date: June 6, 2015
- Distance: 1 1/2 mi (12 furlongs; 2,414 m)
- Winning horse: American Pharoah
- Winning time: 2:26.65
- Final odds: 0.75 (to 1)
- Jockey: Victor Espinoza
- Trainer: Bob Baffert
- Owner: Zayat Stables, LLC
- Conditions: Fast
- Surface: Dirt
- Attendance: 90,000

The 2015 Belmont Stakes (known as the 147th Belmont Stakes presented by DraftKings for sponsorship reasons) was the 147th in the Belmont Stakes series. The 1 1/2-mile (2,400 m) race, known as the "test of the champion" and sometimes called the "final jewel" in thoroughbred horse racing's traditional Triple Crown series, was held on June 6, 2015, three weeks after the Preakness Stakes and five weeks after the Kentucky Derby. The Belmont Stakes was the 11th race of a 13 race card which included 10 stakes races. Post time for race 11 was 6:52 pm EDT.

After winning both the 2015 Kentucky Derby and the Preakness, American Pharoah won the Belmont and became the first horse to win the Triple Crown since Affirmed in 1978. As the 12th Triple Crown winner, American Pharoah ran the race in 2:26.65 which was the sixth-fastest of all time and the second-fastest (following only Secretariat in 1973) amongst Triple Crown winners.

== Pre-race ==
The New York Racing Association, which runs Belmont Park, located in Elmont, New York, announced that attendance for the event would be limited to 90,000. By Friday, June 5, all tickets had been sold out. To ease congestion at Belmont Station from racing fans leaving the venue, which led to hours-long waits the previous year, the Long Island Rail Road invested $4 million to improve mass transit in the area, and the New York Racing Association put in another $1 million. The LIRR added platforms to accommodate 10-car trains, positioned additional empty trains along the branch line to allow more trains to move out of the station, and upgraded staircases and signs. They also altered the schedule at other stations along the branch line to move more trains through Belmont Station. To slow down the flow of people leaving at the same time, the NYRA also brought in the Goo Goo Dolls to perform a post-race concert. On May 29, 2015, the NYRA announced that the daily fantasy sports service DraftKings had acquired presenting sponsorship rights to the race. The deal, whose financial terms were undisclosed, included branding across the event site, the awarding of VIP tickets to a league winner through a promotion, and advertising exclusivity during NBC's telecast of the event.

Two weeks before the event the connections for several horses announced that they would be entering the race after bypassing the Preakness Stakes. These included the following participants of the 2015 Kentucky Derby: Frosted, who finished fourth; Materiality, sixth; Keen Ice, seventh; Mubtaahij, eighth; Carpe Diem, tenth; Frammento, eleventh; and War Story, who was sixteenth. When the field was ultimately drawn for the race on June 3, Carpe Diem and War Story were not entered. A total of eight horses were to participate, all but one of whom had run in either the Derby or, as was the case of Tale of Verve, in the Preakness. The exception was Madefromlucky, who won the Peter Pan Stakes and had last faced American Pharoah in the Arkansas Derby. Every horse entered was a descendant, through his sire, of Mr. Prospector. (Note: Pedigrees in order of starting post position: Mubtaahij, Tale of Verve, Madefromlucky, Frammento, American Pharoah, Frosted, Keen Ice, Materiality.)

American Pharoah had previously defeated every horse entered, but he was also the only horse to contest all three legs of the Triple Crown and had run four races in the preceding eight weeks. Of the group, Frosted, who ran wide on the turn in the Kentucky Derby but rallied strongly to finish fourth, just three lengths from the lead, was considered by some commentators to pose the strongest challenge to American Pharoah. While acknowledging that a Triple Crown win "is something every single person is rooting for", Justin Zayat, of Zayat Stables, LLC, which owns American Pharoah, anticipated a strong run from Materiality.

== Race description ==
The day began with a rainstorm early in the morning which stopped after about an hour. The inner two-thirds of the track were sealed by the maintenance crew, and the track was rated fast by the 11:35 a.m. post time of the first race. The Belmont took place under sunny skies.

Finish of the 2015 Belmont Stakes

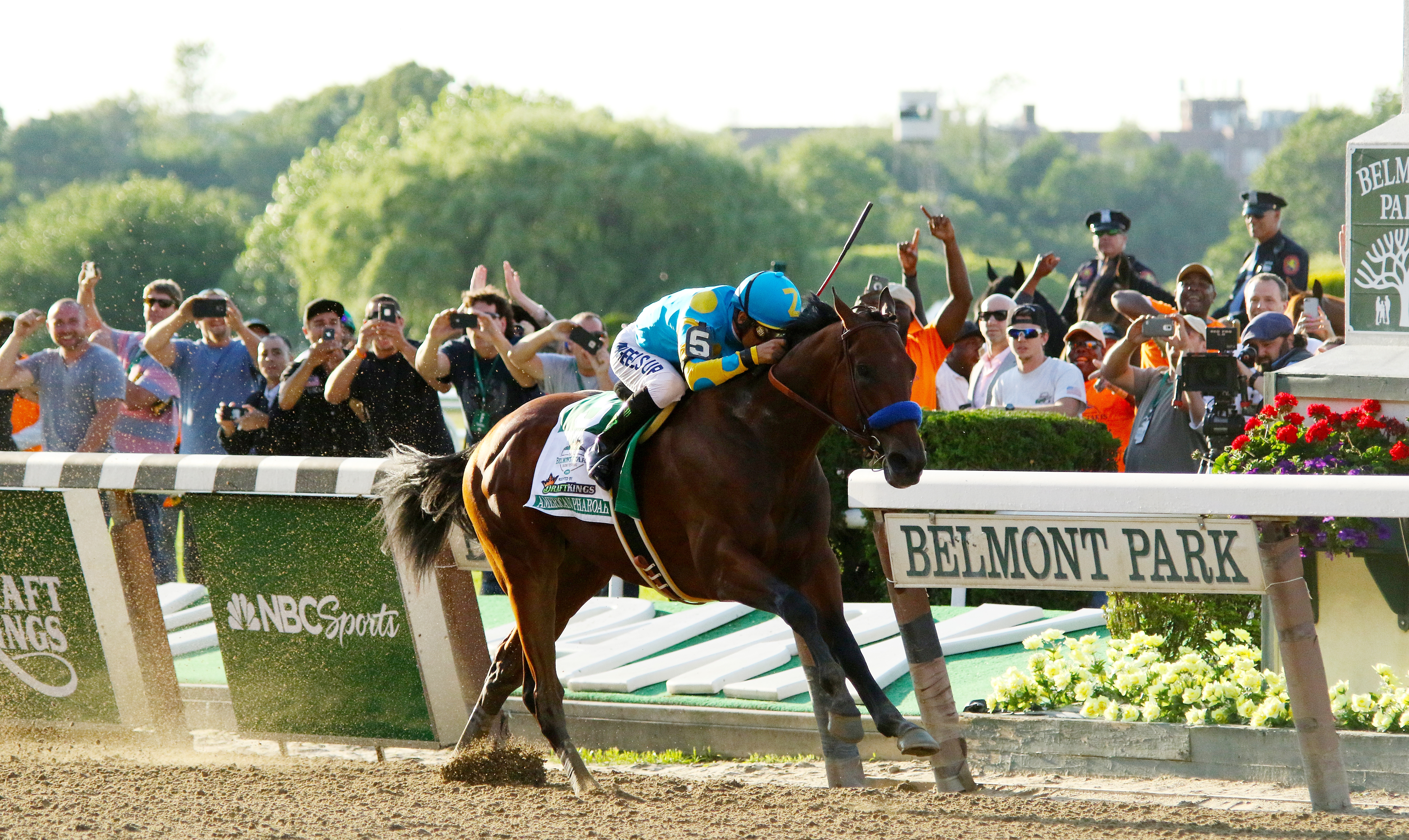
American Pharoah won the Belmont Stakes to become the 12th winner of the US Triple Crown.

American Pharoah, ridden by jockey Victor Espinoza, was leaning back in the starting gate when it opened and was a touch late at the start, but he soon pulled out to an early lead, which he maintained for a gate-to-wire win. American Pharoah steadily increased his lead throughout the race. He was challenged by Materiality until the top of the stretch when Materiality faded, ultimately finishing last, and Frosted pulled into second. Keen Ice ran in the middle of the pack until a late rally brought him into third over Mubtaahij, who was fourth. American Pharoah crossed the finish line leading by 5 1/2 lengths, with a winning time of 2:26:65 for the 1 1/2-mile (2,400 m) race, the second fastest among Triple Crown winners. His margin of victory was the fourth-largest for a Triple Crown winner at the Belmont Stakes. American Pharoah was also the first Belmont winner since Afleet Alex in 2005 to have run all three Triple Crown races.

... “And they’re into the stretch, and American Pharoah makes his run for glory as they come into the final furlong! Frosted is second with one-eighth of a mile to go! American Pharoah's got a two-length lead! Frosted is all out at the sixteenth pole! And here it is! The 37-year wait is over! American Pharoah is finally the one! American Pharoah has won the Triple Crown!”—Larry Collmus, NBC

The win was the fourth attempt at a Triple Crown for trainer Bob Baffert, who at age 62 was the second-oldest trainer to win a Triple Crown. It was the third attempt for jockey Victor Espinoza, who was the first Latino jockey to win the Triple Crown, and, at age 43, the oldest at the time.

== Chart ==
Finish	Post	Horse	Jockey	Trainer	Opening Odds	Post Time Odds	Winnings
1	5	American Pharoah	Victor Espinoza	Bob Baffert	3–5	3–4	$800,000
2	6	Frosted	Joel Rosario	Kiaran McLaughlin	5–1	4–1	$280,000
3	7	Keen Ice	Kent Desormeaux	Dale Romans	20–1	17–1	$150,000
4	1	Mubtaahij	Irad Ortiz Jr.	Michael De Kock	10–1	14–1	$100,000
5	4	Frammento	Mike E. Smith	Nick Zito	30–1	21–1	$60,000
6	3	Madefromlucky	Javier Castellano	Todd Pletcher	12–1	14–1	$45,000
7	2	Tale of Verve	Gary Stevens	Dallas Stewart	15–1	19–1	$35,000
8	8	Materiality	John R. Velazquez	Todd Pletcher	6–1	5–1	$30,000

Times: 1/4— 0:24.06; 1/2— 0:48.83; 3/4— 1:13.41; mile—1:37.99; 1 1/4—2:02.33; final—2:26.65.
Fractional Splits: (:24.06) (:24.77) (:24.58) (:24.58) (:24.34) (:24.32)

== Payout ==
The 147th Belmont Payout Schedule

Program Number	Horse Name	Win	Place	Show
5	American Pharoah	$3.50	$2.80	$2.50
6	Frosted	–	$3.50	$2.90
7	Keen Ice	–	–	$4.60

- $2 Exacta (5–6): $13.60
- $2 Trifecta (5–6–7): $109.50
- $1 Superfecta (5–6–7–1): $285.00

== See also ==
- 2015 Kentucky Derby
- 2015 Preakness Stakes
