= San Clemente Handicap =

- Class: Grade II
- Location: Del Mar Racetrack; Del Mar, California, United States
- Inaugurated: 1949
- Race type: Thoroughbred – Flat racing
- Website: Del Mar

Race information
- Distance: 1 mile
- Surface: turf
- Track: left-handed
- Qualification: Three-year-old fillies
- Weight: Assigned
- Purse: US$200,000

The San Clemente Handicap is a Grade II American Thoroughbred horse race for three-year-old fillies over a distance of one mile on the turf course scheduled annually in late July or early August at Del Mar Racetrack in Del Mar, California. The event currently carries a purse of $200,000.

== History ==
The event was inaugurated on 17 August 1949 as the San Clemente Handicap as a fillies & mares, three-year-olds and older handicap and was won by the six year old mare Good Breeze who defeated the favourite Honeymoon who was giving 31 1/2 pounds to the winner in a time of 1:37.20 for the mile. The following year the event was named the San Clemente Claiming Handicap and was open to all horses three-year-olds and older with an increase in distance to 1 1/16 miles and the event was won by the four year old gelding Vino Fino who took the lead 70 years from the finishing line and won by a length and three quarters.

The event then was idle until 1970 when it was renewed as the San Clemente Stakes on the turf track for three year old fillies only.

The distance was decreased to one mile in 1988 and has been held the same to date.

In 1994 the event was classified as Grade III and was upgraded to Grade II in 1996.

The event has been split into divisions five times with last time occurring in 1990. The event was run with handicap conditions between 1988 and 2017. From 2018 to 2023 the condition of the event was a stakes with allowances. In 2024 the event reverted back to handicap conditions.

The event is considered a major preparatory race for the Grade I Del Mar Oaks which is run later in the Del Mar summer meeting.

== Records ==
Speed record

- 1 mile: 1:33.54 – Storm Mesa (2008)
- 1 1/16 miles: – 1:42.60 Mint Leaf (1985)

Margins

- 6 lengths – Lituya Bay (1983)

Most wins by a jockey

- 5 – Chris McCarron (1984, 1985, 1991, 1994, 1995)

Most wins by a trainer

- 4 – A. Thomas Doyle (1975 both divisions, 1976, 1977)
- 4 – Robert J. Frankel (1984, 1989, 1996, 2000)
- 4 – James M. Cassidy (2003, 2007, 2010, 2015)

Most wins by an owner

- 2 – Kaleem Shah (2012, 2021)
- 2 – Glen Hill Farm (1990, 2013)
- 2 – Team Valor Stables (1999, 2001)
- 2 – Gary Barber (2018, 2020)
- 2 – Little Red Feather Racing (2024, 2025)

San Clemente Handicap – Del Mar Oaks double

- Go March (1976), French Charmer (1981), Fashionably Late (1984), Flawlessly (1991), Hollywood Wildcat (1993), Famous Digger (1997), Sicy d'Alsace (FR) (1998), Evening Jewel (2010), Anisette (GB) (2023), Iscreamuscream (2024)

== Winners ==
| Year | Winner | Jockey | Trainer | Owner | Distance | Time | Purse | Grade | Ref Anisette (GB) |
|---|---|---|---|---|---|---|---|---|---|
San Clemente Handicap
| 2026 | Somerset West | Armando Ayuso | John W. Sadler | Keith Abrahams | 1 mile | 1:34.76 | $200,000 | II | |
| 2025 | Thought Process | Hector Berrios | Philip D'Amato | Estate of Brereton C. Jones, Little Red Feather Racing & Madaket Stables | 1 mile | 1:36.24 | $202,000 | II | |
| 2024 | Iscreamuscream | Hector Berrios | Philip D'Amato | Little Red Feather Racing, John Hundley Jr, Marsha Naify, John & Stacey Snyder | 1 mile | 1:35.87 | $202,500 | II | |
San Clemente Stakes
| 2023 | Anisette (GB) | Umberto Rispoli | Leonard Powell | Eclipse Thoroughbred Partners | 1 mile | 1:34.84 | $204,500 | II | |
| 2022 | Bellabel (IRE) | Umberto Rispoli | Philip D'Amato | Benowitz Family Trust, CYBT, Michael Nentwig & Ray Pagano | 1 mile | 1:35.32 | $203,500 | II | |
| 2021 | Madone | Juan Hernandez | Simon Callaghan | Kaleem Shah | 1 mile | 1:35.28 | $202,500 | II | |
| 2020 | Laura's Light | Abel Cedillo | Peter L. Miller | Gary Barber | 1 mile | 1:34.16 | $152,500 | II | |
| 2019 | Mucho Unusual | Joel Rosario | Tim Yakteen | George Krikorian | 1 mile | 1:34.66 | $201,755 | II | |
| 2018 | War Heroine | Tyler Baze | Peter L. Miller | Gary Barber | 1 mile | 1:34.90 | $202,760 | II | |
San Clemente Handicap
| 2017 | Madam Dancealot (IRE) | Jamie Theriot | Richard Baltas | Slam Dunk Racing | 1 mile | 1:34.75 | $201,035 | II | |
| 2016 | Mokat | Kent J. Desormeaux | Richard Baltas | JK Racing Stable | 1 mile | 1:35.23 | $201,725 | II | |
| 2015 | Prize Exhibit (GB) | Santiago González | James M. Cassidy | DP Racing | 1 mile | 1:36.05 | $200,250 | II | |
| 2014 | Istanford | Rafael Bejarano | Michael Stidham | Dawn & Ike Thrash and Janet & Sam Alley | 1 mile | 1:33.83 | $201,750 | II | |
| 2013 | Wishing Gate | Gary L. Stevens | Thomas F. Proctor | Glen Hill Farm | 1 mile | 1:33.58 | $151,000 | II | |
| 2012 | Eden's Moon | Rafael Bejarano | Bob Baffert | Kaleem Shah | 1 mile | 1:34.38 | $150,000 | II | |
| 2011 | Up In Time (GB) | Rafael Bejarano | Simon Callaghan | Anthony Ramsden | 1 mile | 1:34.66 | $150,000 | II | |
| 2010 | Evening Jewel | Victor Espinoza | James M. Cassidy | Tom & Marilyn Braly | 1 mile | 1:35.36 | $150,000 | II | |
| 2009 | Starlarks (IRE) | Alex O. Solis | Patrick Gallagher | Dolantori Racing | 1 mile | 1:33.82 | $150,000 | II | |
| 2008 | Storm Mesa | Eddie Martin Jr. | W. Bret Calhoun | Richard L. Davis | 1 mile | 1:33.54 | $150,000 | II | |
| 2007 | Passified (GB) | Mike E. Smith | James M. Cassidy | Forging Oaks Farm | 1 mile | 1:34.15 | $150,000 | II | |
| 2006 | Attima (GB) | Victor Espinoza | Julio C. Canani | Anthony Fanticola & Joseph Scardino | 1 mile | 1:34.65 | $150,000 | II | |
| 2005 | Shining Energy | René R. Douglas | Julio C. Canani | J. Terrence Lanni & Bernard C. Schiappa | 1 mile | 1:34.25 | $150,000 | II | |
| 2004 | Sweet Win | Victor Espinoza | Jeff Mullins | Gayle Fogelson | 1 mile | 1:34.11 | $150,000 | II | |
| 2003 | § Katdogawn (GB) | Julie Krone | James M. Cassidy | John R. Cuchna, Jim Ford Inc. & Deron Pearson | 1 mile | 1:33.62 | $150,000 | II | |
| 2002 | Little Treasure (FR) | Kent J. Desormeaux | Laura de Seroux | Port Trust, Liberty Road Stable & San Gabriel Investments | 1 mile | 1:33.97 | $150,000 | II | |
| 2001 | Reine de Romance (IRE) | Eddie Delahoussaye | Jenine Sahadi | Team Valor Stables & Gary Barber | 1 mile | 1:34.88 | $150,000 | II | |
| 2000 | Uncharted Haven (GB) | Alex O. Solis | Robert J. Frankel | 3 Plus U Stable | 1 mile | 1:35.13 | $150,000 | II | |
| 1999 | Sweet Ludy (IRE) | Corey Nakatani | Jenine Sahadi | Team Valor Stables, Heiligbrodt Racing Stables, King, et al. | 1 mile | 1:35.02 | $150,000 | II | |
| 1998 | Sicy d'Alsace (FR) | Corey Nakatani | Nick Canani | Bloodstock Management Services & Dehaven | 1 mile | 1:34.97 | $112,500 | II | |
| 1997 | Famous Digger | Brice Blanc | Barry Abrams | Let It Ride Stable, et al. | 1 mile | 1:36.00 | $111,725 | II | |
| 1996 | True Flare | Corey Nakatani | Robert J. Frankel | Juddmonte Farms | 1 mile | 1:35.59 | $107,200 | II | |
| 1995 | Jewel Princess | Chris McCarron | Wallace Dollase | Richard J. Stephen | 1 mile | 1:36.12 | $104,650 | III | |
| 1994 | Work the Crowd | Chris McCarron | Greg Gilchrist | Harris Farms & Norma, Foster & Maddy | 1 mile | 1:36.07 | $82,300 | III | |
| 1993 | Hollywood Wildcat | Eddie Delahoussaye | Neil D. Drysdale | Irving Cowan & Marjorie Cowan | 1 mile | 1:34.89 | $83,700 | | |
| 1992 | Golden Treat | Kent J. Desormeaux | Richard E. Mandella | Golden Eagle Farm | 1 mile | 1:35.20 | $83,100 | | |
| 1991 | Flawlessly | Chris McCarron | Charles E. Whittingham | Harbor View Farm | 1 mile | 1:34.88 | $109,600 | | |
| 1990 | Nijinsky's Lover | Gary L. Stevens | D. Wayne Lukas | Wildenstein Stable | 1 mile | 1:36.20 | $84,050 | | Division 1 |
| 1990 | Lonely Girl | Pat Valenzuela | Willard L. Proctor | Glen Hill Farm | 1 mile | 1:36.40 | $84,050 | | Division 2 |
| 1989 | § Darby's Daughter | Gary L. Stevens | Robert J. Frankel | Edmund Gann | 1 mile | 1:36.60 | $110,000 | | |
| 1988 | Do So | Alex O. Solis | Ron McAnally | Jack Kent Cooke | 1 mile | 1:35.80 | $84,400 | | |
San Clemente Stakes
| 1987 | Davie's Lamb | Fernando Toro | Julio C. Canani | Deals On Stable | 1 1/16 miles | 1:42.80 | $42,375 | | Division 1 |
| 1987 | Future Bright | Pat Valenzuela | Melvin F. Stute | D. S. Zuckerman | 1 1/16 miles | 1:44.60 | $42,175 | | Division 2 |
| 1986 | Our Sweet Sham | Santiago B. Soto | Craig Anthony Lewis | Brown & Retzlaff | 1 1/16 miles | 1:43.20 | $55,950 | | |
| 1985 | Mint Leaf | Chris McCarron | Thomas L. Walker | Calumet Farm | 1 1/16 miles | 1:42.60 | $56,150 | | |
| 1984 | Fashionably Late | Chris McCarron | Robert J. Frankel | Mrs. B. R. Firestone (Lessee) | 1 1/16 miles | 1:43.20 | $55,300 | | |
| 1983 | Eastern Bettor | Rafael Q. Meza | Mike R. Mitchell | Hanson Stock Farm | 1 1/16 miles | 1:44.00 | $42,750 | | Division 1 |
| 1983 | Lituya Bay | Laffit Pincay Jr. | Laz Barrera | Aaron U. Jones | 1 1/16 miles | 1:43.80 | $42,250 | | Division 2 |
| 1982 | Northern Style | Marco Castaneda | Louis R. Carno | Mr. & Mrs. T. M. Cavanagh | 1 1/16 miles | 1:43.40 | $54,700 | | |
| 1981 | French Charmer | Darrel G. McHargue | John W. Russell | W. F. Roden | 1 1/16 miles | 1:44.20 | $44,850 | | |
| 1980 | Plenty O'Toole | Terry Lipham | John W. Fulton | Coppertree | 1 1/16 miles | 1:44.20 | $45,050 | | |
| 1979 | Ancient Art | Fernando Toro | Charles E. Whittingham | Howard B. Keck | 1 1/16 miles | 1:44.20 | $39,300 | | |
| 1978 | Miss Magnetic | Marco Castaneda | Ron McAnally | Elmendorf | 1 1/16 miles | 1:44.20 | $22,550 | | Division 1 |
| 1978 | Joe's Bee | Laffit Pincay Jr. | Laz Barrera | Duo Stable | 1 1/16 miles | 1:44.40 | $22,150 | | Division 2 |
| 1977 | Teisen Lap | Darrel G. McHargue | A. Thomas Doyle | Fitzsimons Jr. & Maytag | 1 1/16 miles | 1:44.80 | $21,850 | | |
| 1976 | Go March | Donald Pierce | A. Thomas Doyle | Toshiaki Kanasashi | 1 1/16 miles | 1:42.80 | $22,150 | | |
| 1975 | Miss Francesca | Darrel G. McHargue | A. Thomas Doyle | Canadiana Farms | 1 1/16 miles | 1:43.20 | $17,225 | | Division 1 |
| 1975 | † Princess Papulee | Fernando Toro | A. Thomas Doyle | Getty, Guinn, Evey & Riordan | 1 1/16 miles | 1:43.80 | $17,025 | | Division 2 |
| 1974 | Bold Ballet | Fernando Toro | Thomas A. Pratt | Leone J. Peters | 1 1/16 miles | 1:44.00 | $22,350 | | |
| 1973 | Button Top | Steve J. Valdez | Robert G. Craft | Craft, Ritt, Whiting, Giovinazzo & O’Hara | 1 1/16 miles | 1:43.80 | $21,750 | | |
| 1972 | Bert's Tryst | Rudy Rosales | Frank E. Holman | Frank E. Holman | 1 1/16 miles | 1:43.00 | $16,350 | | |
| 1971 | Gowran Green | Rudy Rosales | Gordon C. Campbell | B. J. Ridder | 1 1/16 miles | 1:43.80 | $16,100 | | |
| 1970 | Loved | Jerry Lambert | Johnny Longden | Frank McMahon | 1 1/16 miles | 1:43.80 | $16,525 | | |
| 1951–1969 | | Race not held | | | | | | | |
San Clemente Claiming Handicap
| 1950 | § Vino Fino | Billy Pearson | Richard H. McDaniel | Mr. & Mrs. Elmer C. Smith | 1 1/16 miles | 1:42.80 | $5,775 | | ‡ 3YO & older |
San Clemente Handicap
| 1949 | § Good Excuse | Frank Chojnacki | Paul L. Lycan | Mrs. A. W. Ryan | 1 mile | 1:37.20 | $5,000 | | ¶ 3YO f&m |

Legend:
Turf Dirt
Notes:
§ Ran as an entry
† In the 1975 second division event Mia Amore finished first but was disqualified to second. Princess Papulee was declared the winner.
‡ The 1950 winner Vino Fino was a four-year-old gelding.
¶ The 1949 winner Good Excuse was a six-year-old mare.

== See also ==
List of American and Canadian Graded races
