= Keen Ice =

American-bred Thoroughbred racehorse

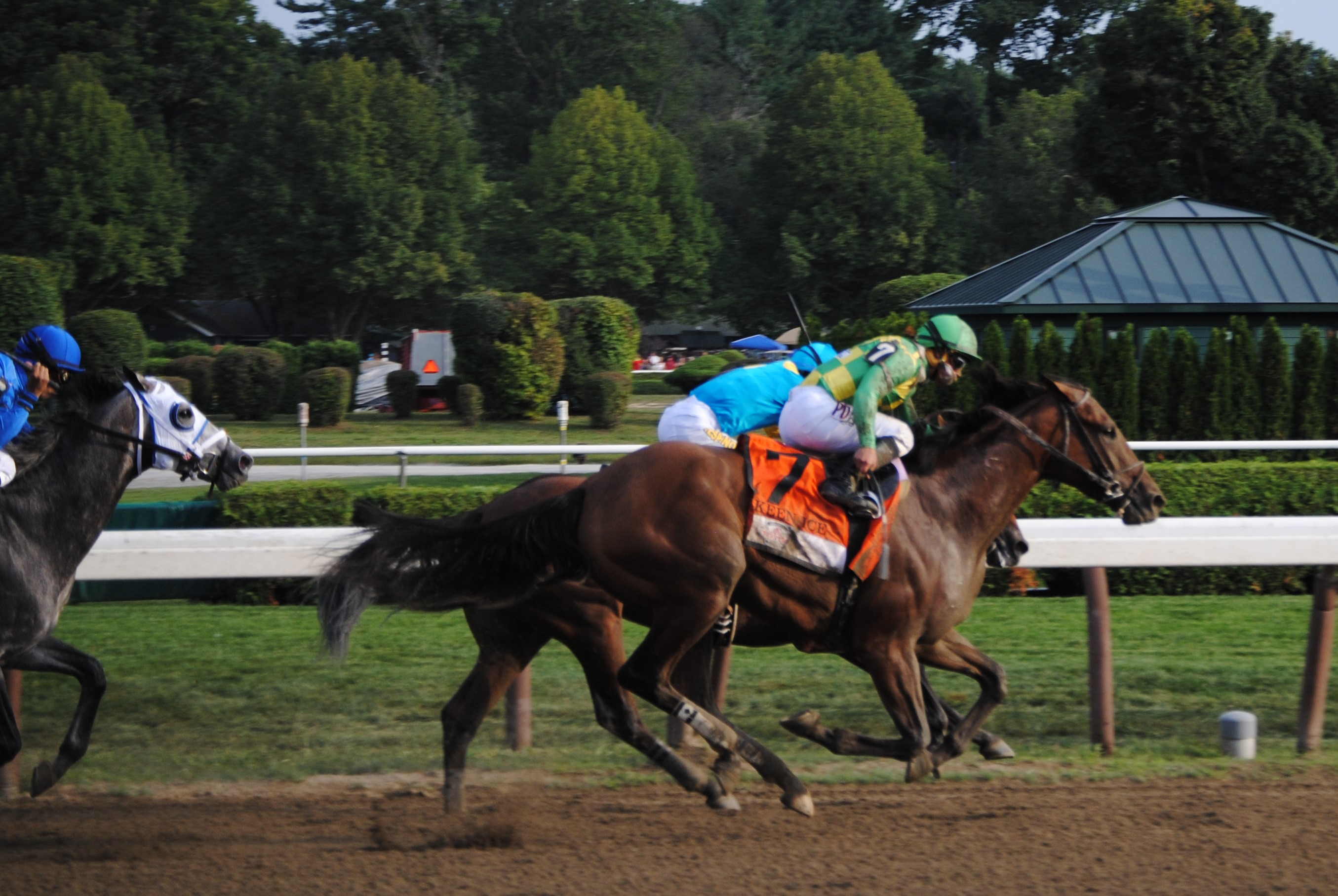
- Keen Ice passes American Pharoah in the 2015 Travers Stakes
- Sire: Curlin
- Grandsire: Smart Strike
- Dam: Medomak
- Damsire: Awesome Again
- Sex: Colt
- Foaled: March 25, 2012
- Country: United States
- Color: Bay
- Breeder: Glencrest Farm
- Owner: Donegal Racing; Donegal Racing and Calumet Farm (2017)
- Trainer: Dale Romans; Todd Pletcher
- Record: 24: 3-4-5
- Earnings: US$3,407,245

Major wins
- Travers Stakes (2015); Suburban Handicap (2017)
- Last updated on October 26, 2017

Keen Ice (foaled March 25, 2012) is an American Thoroughbred racehorse, best known for winning the 2015 Travers Stakes in an upset win over Triple Crown Champion American Pharoah. He previously faced off against American Pharoah and other notable horses in the 2015 Kentucky Derby, finishing seventh, was third in the 2015 Belmont Stakes, and was second in the 2015 Haskell Invitational Stakes. Prior to the Travers, his only other win had been a maiden race at Churchill Downs as a two-year-old.

After the Travers Stakes win, Keen Ice went on a 22-month losing streak, during which his most noteworthy accomplishments were fourth- and third-place finishes in the Breeders' Cup Classic of 2015 and 2016 respectively. He finally returned to the winners circle in the 2017 Suburban Handicap, then finished second in both the Whitney Stakes and Jockey Club Gold Cup. He was retired to stud at Calumet Farm in October 2017 after a minor injury.

At stud, Keen Ice sired the 2022 Kentucky Derby winner Rich Strike, another upset winner who, at odds of 80-1, became the second longest shot in history to win the race.

== Background ==
Keen Ice is a bay horse with a white stocking on his left hind leg. He is a son of Curlin who was voted American Horse of the Year in 2008 and 2009. His dam Medomak, a daughter of Awesome Again, finished unplaced on her only start. She was a distant descendant of The Oaks winner Monade who was the ancestor of several major winners including Sadeem. Keen Ice was bred by Glencrest Farm and first sold as a weanling for $48,000 at the 2012 Keeneland breeding stock sale. He was sold again the following year, as a yearling, for $120,000, purchased by Jerry Crawford, acting as the agent for Donegal Racing, an Iowa-based horse racing syndicate with about 25 members, led by Crawford.

Inspired by Curlin, the name of his sire, Keen Ice was named for a term in the sport of curling, describing ice that is particularly fast (or "keen") allowing a rock to travel further over it given the same amount of force.

== Racing career ==
=== 2014: two-year-old-season ===
Keen Ice was placed into training with Dale Romans. He showed promise in his four races as a two-year-old, winning a maiden race on his second start and later finishing third in the Grade II Remsen Stakes.

=== 2015: three-year-old-season ===
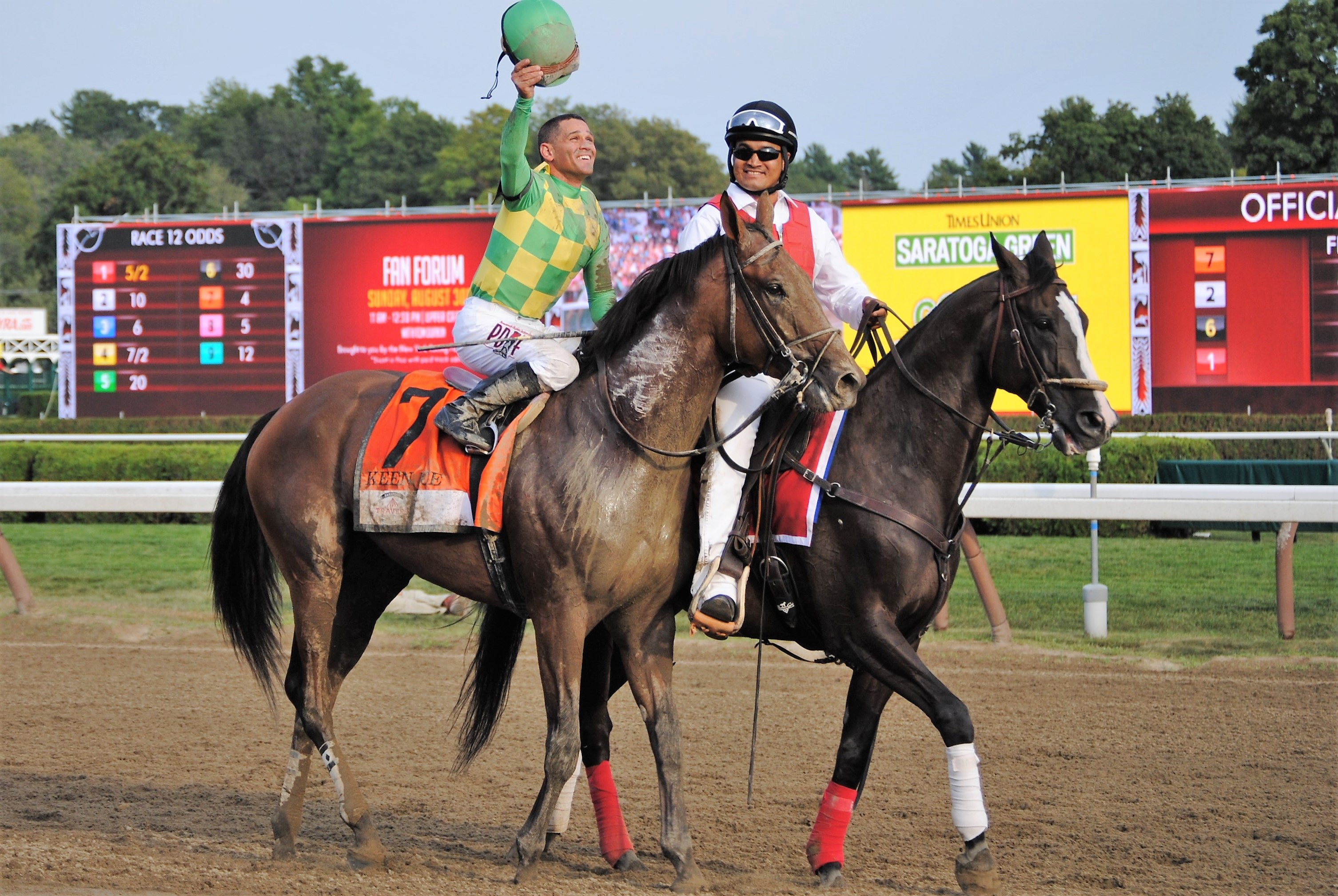
Keen Ice and Castellano after the Travers win

On the 2015 Road to the Kentucky Derby, Keen Ice earned 22 qualifying points with a third-place finish in the 2014 Remsen Stakes as a two-year-old, another third in February as a three-year-old in the 2015 Risen Star Stakes and a fourth-place finish in the Louisiana Derby. However, he only earned a spot in the starting gate for the Kentucky Derby after the 20th-qualifying horse, Madefromlucky, was not entered. After being trapped on the rail early on, he was held up behind other horses before responding willingly in the stretch to finish seventh. He skipped the 2015 Preakness Stakes, then contested the 2015 Belmont Stakes, where he finished third by a neck, notably after being five wide at the top of the stretch.

His next race was the Haskell Invitational, where he finished a fast-finishing second by 2 1/4 lengths to American Pharoah, and three lengths ahead of the rest of the field. Throughout his races, he was noted for his stamina-infused pedigree, late closing style and willingness; his low placings not viewed as reflecting the strong efforts he put forth in his races.

Entering the Travers Stakes, trainer Romans was confident. Having switched jockeys from Kent Desormeaux to Javier Castellano, Romans told the press prior to the race that he was grateful to the New York Racing Association for capping the Saratoga Race Course attendance at 50,000 people, thus limiting the numbers there to boo Keen Ice after he defeated Triple Crown champion American Pharoah. His prediction of a win proved accurate when the colt went off at 16-1, stalking front runners American Pharoah and Frosted before taking the lead at the sixteenth pole and winning by about 3/4 of a length. Romans was however surprised by the crowd's reaction to the upset. "They cheered American Pharoah and us," he said. "That was a good feeling about the game and what we do, that people are so knowledgeable and have so much respect for these animals."

In his two subsequent races as a three-year-old, Keen Ice finished twelve and a half lengths behind American Pharoah when fourth in the Breeders' Cup Classic and then finished fourth behind the four-year-old Effinex in the Clark Handicap at Churchill Downs on November 27.

=== 2016: four-year-old-season ===
On his first appearance as a four-year-old, Keen Ice finished sixth in the Donn Handicap and was then shipped to Dubai to contest the Al Maktoum Challenge, Round 3 over ten furlongs on dirt at Meydan Racecourse on March 6. He was made second favorite but started poorly and was never in contention, finishing seventh of the twelve runners, more than eleven lengths behind the winner Special Fighter.

Following an eighth-place finish in the Dubai World Cup, Keen Ice was transferred from the barn of Dale Romans to Todd Pletcher and laid up for six months. He returned in an allowance optional claiming race at Belmont Park on October 7, finishing third. He completed his season with a third-place finish in the Breeders' Cup Classic and a second-place finish in the Harlan's Holiday Stakes at Gulfstream Park.

=== 2017: five-year-old-season ===
Keen Ice made his first start of 2017 on January 28 in the inaugural Pegasus World Cup at Gulfstream Park, finishing fourth. On the week of the race, owner Jerry Crawford announced that Keen Ice's breeding rights had been sold to Calumet Farm. The agreement with Calumet allowed Keen Ice to continue racing until the end of 2017.

In March, Keen Ice was shipped to Meydan Racecourse where he finished seventh in his a second try at the Dubai World Cup. On returning to the United States, Pletcher gave Keen Ice some time off at Calumet Farm, then entered him in the Suburban Handicap at Belmont Park on July 8. In the early part of the race, Keen Ice raced at the back of the field of five behind a very slow pace, then started to make up ground around the turn. Shaman Ghost, the odds-on favorite, moved to the lead as they entered the stretch with Keen Ice advancing steadily on the outside. Down the stretch, Keen Ice made a sustained drive and pulled away to win by three lengths. "I know that Shaman Ghost is a really good horse but how the race developed, my horse pulled me really close to him," said jockey Jose Ortiz. "I thought I was going to be a little farther (behind). When we hit the three-eighths pole, I was right next to (Shaman Ghost), on his heels, without asking, so I was in a very good position. Keen Ice gave me everything he had. He was full of run today."

Keen Ice made his next start in the Whitney Stakes on August 5 at Saratoga, where he made a late run to finish second to heavy favorite Gun Runner. On October 7, he again finished second, this time to Diversify in the Jockey Club Gold Cup. He was training for his third appearance in the Breeders' Cup Classic when he wrenched his ankle, resulting in his retirement.

== Stud career ==
Keen Ice stands at Calumet Farm for a service fee of $7,500 in 2022.

=== Notable progeny ===
c = colt, f = filly, g = gelding

Foaled	Name	Sex	Major Wins
2019	Rich Strike	c	Kentucky Derby

== Pedigree ==
Pedigree of Keen Ice (USA), bay horse, 2012
Sire Curlin (USA) 2004	Smart Strike (CAN); 1992	Mr Prospector	Raise A Native
Sire Curlin (USA) 2004	Smart Strike (CAN); 1992	Mr Prospector	Gold Digger
Sire Curlin (USA) 2004	Smart Strike (CAN); 1992	Classy 'n Smart	Smarten
Sire Curlin (USA) 2004	Smart Strike (CAN); 1992	Classy 'n Smart	No Class
Sire Curlin (USA) 2004	Sheriff's Deputy (USA); 1994	Deputy Minister	Vice Regent
Sire Curlin (USA) 2004	Sheriff's Deputy (USA); 1994	Deputy Minister	Mint Copy
Sire Curlin (USA) 2004	Sheriff's Deputy (USA); 1994	Barbarika	Bates Motel
Sire Curlin (USA) 2004	Sheriff's Deputy (USA); 1994	Barbarika	War Exchange
Dam Medomak (USA) 2007	Awesome Again (CAN); 1994	Deputy Minister	Vice Regent
Dam Medomak (USA) 2007	Awesome Again (CAN); 1994	Deputy Minister	Mint Copy
Dam Medomak (USA) 2007	Awesome Again (CAN); 1994	Primal Force	Blushing Groom
Dam Medomak (USA) 2007	Awesome Again (CAN); 1994	Primal Force	Prime Prospect
Dam Medomak (USA) 2007	Wiscasset (USA); 2000	Kris S	Roberto
Dam Medomak (USA) 2007	Wiscasset (USA); 2000	Kris S	Sharp Queen
Dam Medomak (USA) 2007	Wiscasset (USA); 2000	Tara Roma	Lyphard
Dam Medomak (USA) 2007	Wiscasset (USA); 2000	Tara Roma	Chic Shirine (Family: 13-d)
