= International Star =

American Thoroughbred racehorse

- Sire: Fusaichi Pegasus
- Grandsire: Mr Prospector
- Dam: Parlez
- Damsire: French Deputy
- Sex: Colt
- Foaled: March 14, 2012
- Country: United States
- Colour: Bay
- Breeder: Katharine M. Voss & Robert T. Manfuso
- Owner: Kenneth and Sarah Ramsey
- Trainer: Michael J. Maker
- Record: 19-6-4-1
- Earnings: $1,247,529

International Star is a retired American Thoroughbred racehorse. He accumulated 171 points for the 2015 Road to the Kentucky Derby which is the most points ever for non-extended series events accumulated in the series. He had won the Grey Stakes (10 points), Lecomte Stakes (10 points), Risen Star Stakes (50 points), and Louisiana Derby (100 points). He also had a fourth-place finish in the Kentucky Jockey Club Stakes (1 point). Despite this, he was scratched from the Kentucky Derby.

== Background ==
International Star was bred in New York by Katharine Voss and Robert Manfuso. Ken and Sarah Ramsey purchased him as a yearling for $85,000 at the 2013 Fasig-Tipton Midlantic Eastern Fall Yearling Sale. By his fourth start he became a graded stakes winner by finishing first in the Grey Stakes. At age three he went on to win consecutive races in the Lecomte Stakes, Risen Star Stakes, and Louisiana Derby. However, on the day of the Kentucky Derby, a chip was discovered in his left front ankle that would require surgery. The horse was scratched from the race due to this development. He returned to racing, winning the Louisiana Stakes and finishing second in the New Orleans Handicap and Mineshaft Handicap. He retired with a 6–4–1 record out of 19 starts and earned $1,247,529. He was sold to Haras Porta Pia Stud Farm near Santiago, Chile, entering stud in 2020.

== Pedigree ==
Pedigree of
Sire Fusaichi Pegasus (USA) 1997	Mr Prospector (USA); 1970	Raise a Native	Native Dancer
Sire Fusaichi Pegasus (USA) 1997	Mr Prospector (USA); 1970	Raise a Native	Raise You
Sire Fusaichi Pegasus (USA) 1997	Mr Prospector (USA); 1970	Gold Digger	Nashua
Sire Fusaichi Pegasus (USA) 1997	Mr Prospector (USA); 1970	Gold Digger	Sequence
Sire Fusaichi Pegasus (USA) 1997	Angel Fever (USA); 1990	Danzig	Northern Dancer
Sire Fusaichi Pegasus (USA) 1997	Angel Fever (USA); 1990	Danzig	Pas De Nom
Sire Fusaichi Pegasus (USA) 1997	Angel Fever (USA); 1990	Rowdy Angel	Halo†
Sire Fusaichi Pegasus (USA) 1997	Angel Fever (USA); 1990	Rowdy Angel	Ramhyde
Dam Parlez (USA) 1999	French Deputy (USA); 1992	Deputy Minister	Vice Regent
Dam Parlez (USA) 1999	French Deputy (USA); 1992	Deputy Minister	Mint Copy
Dam Parlez (USA) 1999	French Deputy (USA); 1992	Mitterand	Hold Your Peace
Dam Parlez (USA) 1999	French Deputy (USA); 1992	Mitterand	Laredo Lass
Dam Parlez (USA) 1999	Speak Halory (USA); 1989	Verbatim	Speak John
Dam Parlez (USA) 1999	Speak Halory (USA); 1989	Verbatim	Well Kept
Dam Parlez (USA) 1999	Speak Halory (USA); 1989	Halory	Halo†
Dam Parlez (USA) 1999	Speak Halory (USA); 1989	Halory	Cold Reply

† indicates inbreeding 4s x 4d to Halo, meaning Halo appears in the fourth generation of the sire's side of the pedigree and in the fourth generation of the dam's side.
