= Kaleem Shah =

American entrepreneur, computer engineer and owner of Thoroughbred race horses

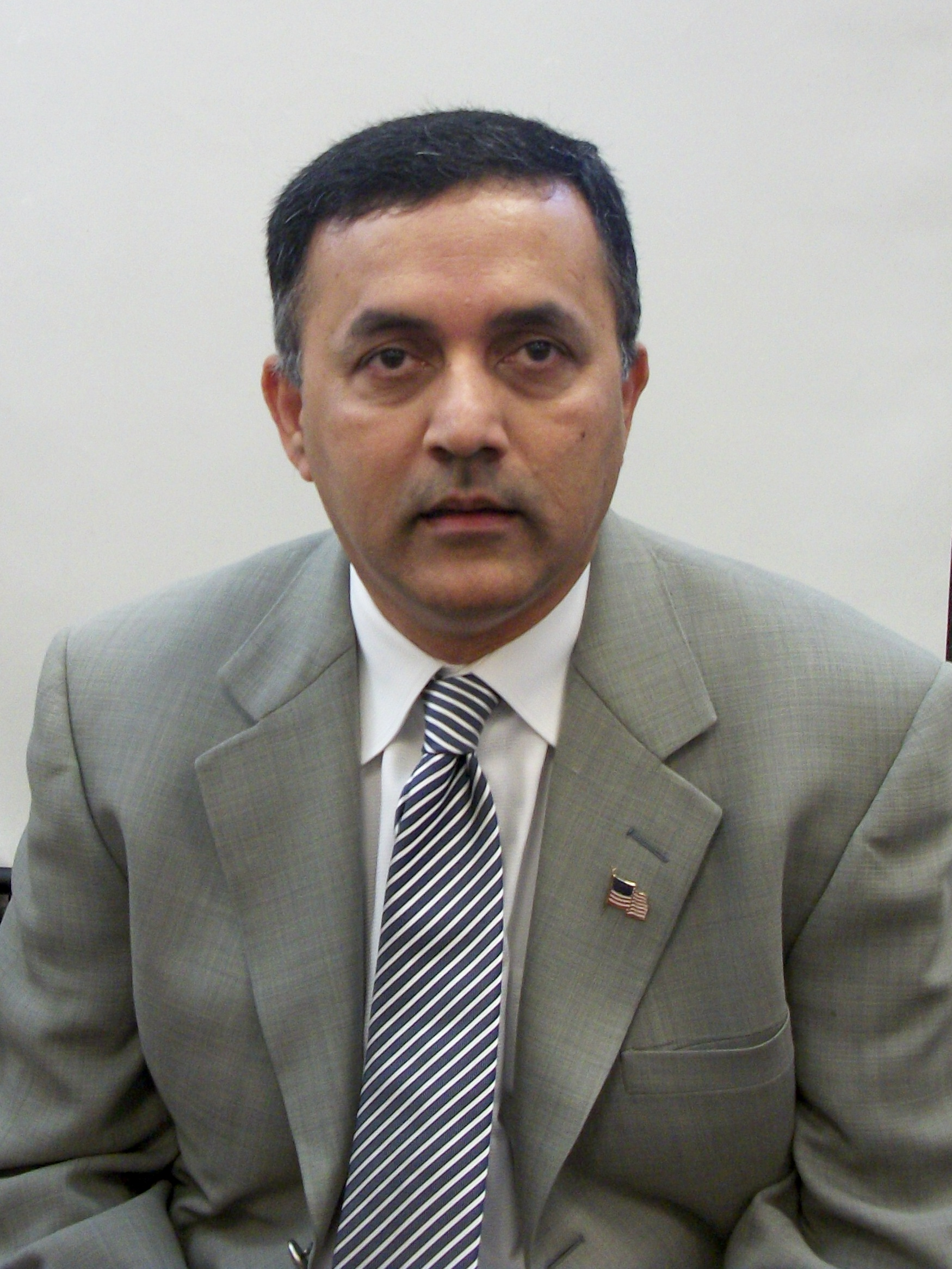
- Born: 6 July 1962 (age 62); Bellary, India
- Citizenship: United States
- Education: Bangalore University (BS.), Clemson University (MS.), George Washington University, (MBA.)
- Occupation(s): Businessman and entrepreneur
- Known for: Founder of CALNET
- Title: CEO, CALNET
- Spouse: Lubna Shah
- Children: Sophia (daughter); Arman (son)
- Website: www.calnet.com

Kaleem Shah (born July 6, 1962) is an American entrepreneur, computer engineer and owner of Thoroughbred race horses. He is known for founding the IT and telecommunications consulting firm CALNET. Born in India, educated in India and the United States, he became a U.S. citizen in the early 1990s. He is the son of Indian horse trainer Majeed Shah.

== Background ==
Shah was born in Bellary, in southern India. His father, Majeed Shah, was a well-known thoroughbred horse trainer in the country who trained two Indian Triple Crown winners. Shah grew up surrounded by horse training and racing, and his exposure grew into a lifelong love of the sport. However, his father discouraged him from becoming a horse trainer due to the hand-to-mouth existence of all but the very top individuals. His father's advice to him was "should you be blessed with good fortune, if you want to own horses down the road, so be it.”

Shah earned a BS in electrical engineering from Bangalore University in India. He went on to earn a Master of Science in computer engineering from Clemson University, and an MBA in international finance from George Washington University.

After earning his bachelor's degree in 1985, Shah came to the United States to pursue his master's degree. Going on to earn an MBA, he thereafter settled in the United States, working as a software programmer for Telenet. He became a US citizen in the early 1990s, giving up his Indian citizenship. Shah is known for his patriotism, and has stated that he is committed to the defense of America.

== CALNET ==
Shah founded CALNET in 1989 as a solo consultant with less than $3,000 in capital. He obtained his first contract that year from General Electric to provide Diagnostic Software Development services for a Telecommunication System. The company is headquartered in Reston, Virginia with a branch office in San Diego, California. Today the company "provides intelligence analysis, language, and information technology (IT) consulting services to government, telecom, financial, public sector, high-tech, and services organizations" in the United States and internationally. The company provides services to both private businesses and the United States military. As of 2014, he is still the President and CEO. Shah has chosen not to take the company public because he prefers it to “remain agile."

Following the September 11 Attacks in 2001, the U.S. government became the company's main client and provided support services to the armed forces. The company was ranked by Inc. Magazine as one of America's 500 fastest growing companies from 2006 through 2009. From 2010 through 2013, the company grew by 705 percent In 2007 CALNET obtained a $66 million contract with the Intelligence and Security Command (INSCOM) to provide linguist services at Guantanamo Bay and another $104 million to train Defense and military personnel. However, in 2012, he was required to repay the government $18.1 million when a former employee alleged that CALNET had inflated its cost estimates between 2006 and 2009.

On September 13, 2017, Calnet, and its chief executive officer, Kaleem Shah, agreed to pay $300,000 to the U.S. Government. The settlement resolves a qui tam complaint filed against Calnet and Shah that allege that Calnet misrepresented its past private sector experience in providing help desk services in its proposal to win a 2009 FAA contract for IT help desk services.

== Horse racing ==
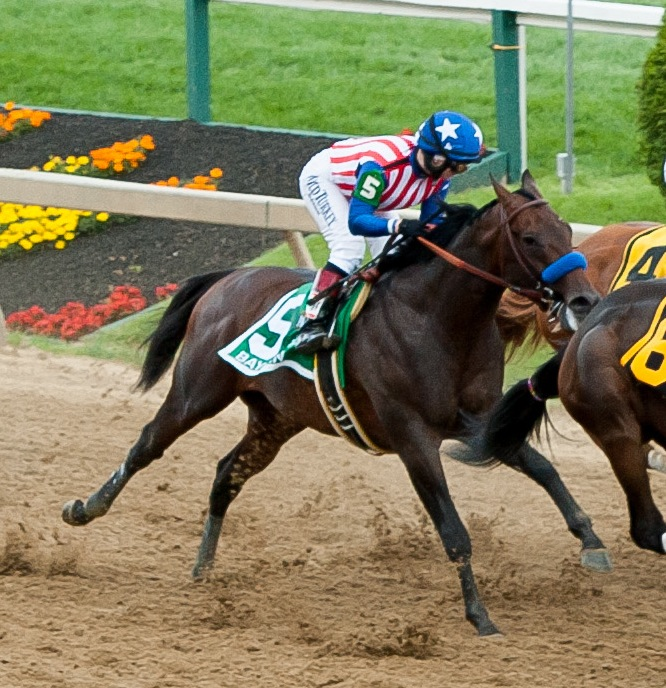
Shah's Grade I winner Bayern.

Stars-and-Stripes themed racing silks of Kaleem Shah

Shah is an avid Thoroughbred horse owner and breeder. His father and uncle were both horse trainers in his native India, though he was encouraged to stay away from the track and get an education instead of following his family's profession. Once in the United States, he bought his first interest in a Thoroughbred in 1996. Reflecting his patriotism, his racing colors are designed with U.S. stars and stripes-themed red, white and blue. He first raced horses on a small scale in Maryland with trainer Jimmy Murphy, and later with Dale Capuano. He then used Doug O'Neill to train his horses on the west coast and currently has horses in training with Bob Baffert at Santa Anita Park. Shah also stands a stallion, Concord Point, at Hill 'n' Dale Farms in Kentucky. Concord Point won the 2010 West Virginia Derby and Iowa Derby. Shah's other winners include May Day Rose, winner of the 2011 Santa Ysabel Stakes and the Railbird Stakes; Edens Moon, who won the Grade 1 Las Virgenes Stakes at Santa Anita in 2012 and the Grade 2 San Clemente Handicap at Del Mar, CA; and Fed Biz, winner of the Grade 2 San Fernando Stakes at Santa Anita in 2013. In 2014, Bayern became his most successful winner to date, having won the Grade I Haskell Invitational Stakes, Pennsylvania Derby and the Breeders' Cup Classic in 2014. In 2015 he won the Santa Anita Derby with Dortmund, who also placed third in the 2015 Kentucky Derby.
