= 2015 Kentucky Derby =

Horse race

141st Kentucky Derby
- Kentucky Derby
- Official logo for the 2015 Kentucky Derby
- Location: Churchill Downs
- Date: May 2, 2015
- Winning horse: American Pharoah
- Winning time: 2:03.02
- Starting price: 3-1
- Jockey: Victor Espinoza
- Trainer: Bob Baffert
- Owner: Zayat Stables, LLC
- Conditions: Fast
- Surface: Dirt
- Attendance: 170,513

The 2015 Kentucky Derby was the 141st running of the Kentucky Derby. The race was run at 6:44 pm Eastern Daylight Time (EDT) on May 2, 2015, at Churchill Downs. It was broadcast in the United States on the NBC television network. Kentucky native Ashley Judd voiced the opening for the telecast of the race, and was the first woman to do so.

The weather was warm, and a record 170,513 people attended. The 2015 race also set a wagering record with parimutuel betting of $137.9 million. Jockey Victor Espinoza rode American Pharoah to victory after taking the lead in the homestretch. The race marked the fourth Kentucky Derby win for horse trainer Bob Baffert and the third win for Espinoza.

== Qualification ==
The Kentucky Derby is a race for 3-year-old Thoroughbred horses. The 2015 field was determined by a points system that was introduced in 2013.

== Field ==
The post position draw of the entries for the Kentucky Derby was held on Wednesday, April 29, 2015, at the Churchill Downs Racetrack clubhouse. American Pharoah was installed as the 5-2 morning line favorite. The day after the draw, Todd Pletcher scratched Stanford, stating that the horse was "fine" but they were not pleased with the draw and had been "on the fence" about running in the Derby. On May 1, El Kabeir was scratched due to a possible hoof problem; however, the also-eligible Tale of Verve did not get a chance to run since the scratch was made after the cutoff time that allows also-eligible runners to start in the race. Early on race day, International Star was also scratched after having problems with his left-front foot.

Overall, the 2015 field was considered "the deepest and most talented in decades". Trainer Bob Baffert had the top two favorites: American Pharoah and Dortmund. Dortmund, winner of the Santa Anita Derby, was 6–0 entering the race, a feat matched by 1977 winner Seattle Slew and 2004 winner Smarty Jones. American Pharoah was 4–1, having placed fifth in his debut before running off four straight victories, including an eight-length win in the Arkansas Derby. Baffert described the experience as like being "on pins and needles all week long", as reporters and fans expected one of his two horses to win.

Other notable horses in the field included the undefeated Florida Derby winner Materiality; Wood Memorial winner Frosted; UAE Derby winner Mubtaahij; and Sunland Derby winner Firing Line, who had lost to Dortmund twice by very narrow margins.

== Race description ==
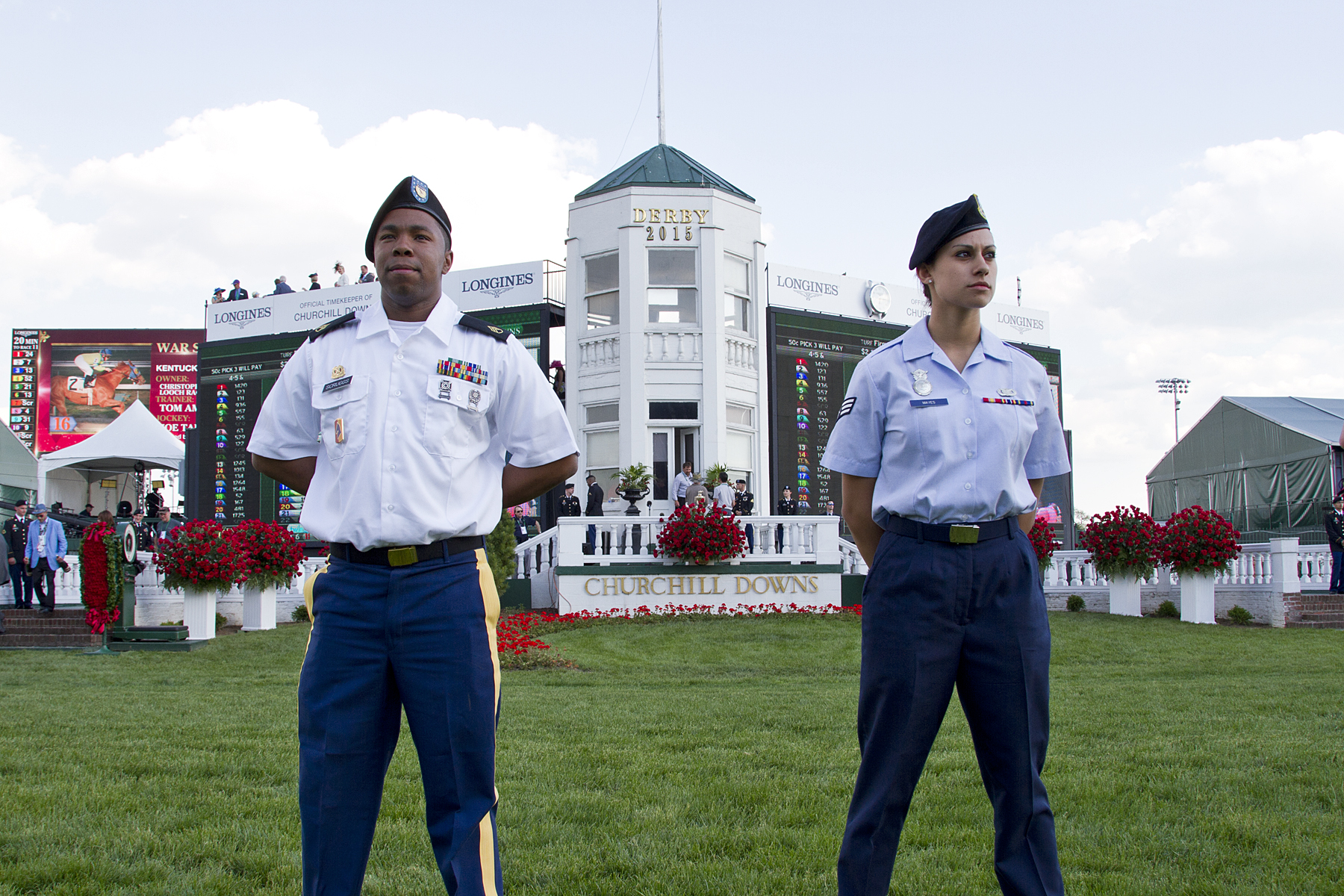
National Guard providing security at the winners circle at Churchill Downs on Derby day

The weather on race day, May 2, 2015, was warm. A record setting 170,513 fans watched the race live at Churchill Downs. The 2015 race also set a record for money wagered with $137.9 million bet from all sources on the Derby and $194.3 million for the entire day of racing. Eighteen horses started the race, which was the eleventh on the race card and started at 6:43 p.m. Television viewership was also higher than in previous years. The Nielsen ratings for the race were 9.6/23, which translated into roughly 16 million viewers.

Dortmund was the first out of the gate, followed closely by Firing Line and then American Pharoah. In the early stages of the Kentucky Derby, Dortmund and Firing Line traded the lead several times. Carpe Diem and American Pharoah were also at the front of the pack, just behind the leaders. Dortmund took the inside position and held it throughout the race. As the horses came around the final turn, it was a three-horse race. Dortmund held the lead on the inside, but Firing Line, running more toward the middle of the track, passed him. American Pharoah, ridden by Victor Espinoza, took the final turn very wide but had the lead by a head in the homestretch. From there, he increased his lead, winning with a time of 2:03.02. Firing Line finished second, one length back; Dortmund took third, three lengths off the lead. Frosted and Danzig Moon rounded out the top five.

It was second straight Derby win for Espinoza, who rode California Chrome to victory in 2014, and his third overall. "I feel like the luckiest Mexican on Earth", he declared after the race. For trainer Bob Baffert, it was his fourth Derby victory and his first since 2002. Espinoza and Baffert had teamed up to win the 2002 Kentucky Derby with War Emblem. For owner Ahmed Zayat, it was his first Derby victory and the end of a streak of losses. His horses had placed second in three of the previous six Kentucky Derbies, including 2009 when American Pharoah's sire, Pioneerof The Nile, finished second. Additionally, Zayat's 2010 entry, Eskendereya, was the morning line favorite but had to scratch with a career-ending leg injury. "I'm speechless", Zayat said. "No more seconds ... This is one special horse ... This is a dream come true." Zayat collected $1.4 million for the win out of the $2.2 million total purse. American Pharoah became the first two-year-old champion to win the Derby since Street Sense in 2007.

=== Results ===
Finish	Program # (Position) (Note: Because of scratches, horses with higher program numbers moved closer to the rail in the starting gate. For example, American Pharoah had saddle cloth number 18 but started from the 15th stall in the starting gate. Post position can be critical as horses strive to get good position going into the first turn of the race.)	Horse	Jockey	Trainer	Morning Line Odds	Final Odds	Margin (lengths)	Winnings	Points
1	18 (15)	American Pharoah	Victor Espinoza	Bob Baffert	5-2	2.9		$1,240,000	160
2	10 (9)	Firing Line	Gary Stevens	Simon Callaghan	12-1	9.5	1	$400,000	58
3	8 (7)	Dortmund	Martin Garcia	Bob Baffert	3-1	4.3	3	$200,000	170
4	15 (12)	Frosted	Joel Rosario	Kiaran McLaughlin	15-1	10.3	3 1/4	$100,000	113
5	5 (5)	Danzig Moon	Julien Leparoux	Mark E. Casse	30-1	22.6	8 1/2	$60,000	45
6	3 (3)	Materiality	Javier Castellano	Todd Pletcher	12-1	11.5	7 3/4		100
7	14 (11)	Keen Ice	Kent Desormeaux	Dale Romans	50-1	45.8	8 3/4		22
8	6 (6)	Mubtaahij	Christophe Soumillon	Michael de Kock	20-1	14.4	9 1/2		100
9	13 (10)	Itsaknockout	Luis Saez	Todd Pletcher	30-1	30.6	10 1/4		60
10	2 (2)	Carpe Diem	John Velazquez	Todd Pletcher	8-1	7.7	11		160
11	21 (18)	Frammento	Corey Nakatani	Nick Zito	50-1	69.5	12		20
12	9 (8)	Bolo	Rafael Bejarano	Carla Gaines	30-1	31.9	12 3/4		30
13	17 (14)	Mr. Z	Ramon A. Vazquez	D. Wayne Lukas	50-1	36.6	15 1/2		34
14	1 (1)	Ocho Ocho Ocho	Elvis Trujillo	James M. Cassidy	50-1	26.1	15 1/2		30
15	20 (17)	Far Right	Mike E. Smith	Ron Moquett	30-1	39.2	15 3/4		62
16	16 (13)	War Story	Joe Talamo	Tom Amoss	50-1	45.3	19 1/4		44
17	4 (4)	Tencendur	Manuel Franco	George Weaver	30-1	52.3	35		41
18	19 (16)	Upstart	José Ortiz	Richard Violette	15-1	15.7	60 1/2		76
scratched	12	~~International Star~~	~~Miguel Mena~~	~~Michael Maker~~	SCR	-	-		171
scratched	7	~~El Kabeir~~	~~Calvin Borel~~	~~John Terranova~~	SCR	-	-		95
scratched	11	~~Stanford~~	~~Florent Geroux~~	~~Todd Pletcher~~	SCR	-	-		40
scratched	22	~~Tale of Verve~~	~~Brian Hernandez Jr.~~	~~Dallas Stewart~~	SCR	-	-		0

Track – Fast

Times: 1/4 mile – 23.24; 1/2 mile – 47.34; 3/4 mile – 1:11.29; mile – 1:36.45; final – 2:03.02.
Splits for each quarter-mile: (23.24) (24.10) (23.95) (25.16) (26.57)

Source: Equibase Chart

== Payout ==
The Kentucky Derby Payout Schedule

Program Number	Horse Name	Win	Place	Show
18	American Pharoah	$7.80	$5.80	$4.20
10	Firing Line	–	$8.40	$5.40
8	Dortmund	–	–	$4.20

- $2 Exacta: (18–10) $72.60
- $1 Trifecta: (18–10–8) $101.00
- $1 Superfecta: (18–10–8–15) $634.10

== Subsequent Grade I wins ==
Several horses from the Derby went on to later wins at the Grade I level. Most notably, American Pharoah went on to win the American Triple Crown and was named Horse of the Year.

- American Pharoah – Preakness Stakes, Belmont Stakes, Haskell Invitational, Breeders' Cup Classic
- Frosted – 2016 Metropolitan Handicap, Whitney Stakes
- Keen Ice – Travers Stakes
- Mubtaahij – 2017 Awesome Again Stakes
- Bolo – 2019 Shoemaker Mile Stakes
