= Simon Callaghan =

Racehorse trainer

Personal information
- Born: March 7, 1983 (age 43) Cambridge, England
- Occupation: Horse trainer

Horse racing career
- Sport: Horse racing
- Career wins: 168+: 101+ North America 67+ UK (ongoing) as of November 29, 2015

Major racing wins
- USA Graded Stakes Wins: Sunland Derby (2015); Santa Anita Oaks (2014); Las Virgenes Stakes (2014, 2019); Vanity Handicap (2013); City of Hope Mile Stakes (2013); San Marcos Stakes (2012, 2013); Gamely Stakes (2011, 2012); John Henry Turf Championship Stakes (2012); Robert J. Frankel Stakes (2012); Yellow Ribbon Stakes (2011); San Clemente Handicap (2011); Harold C. Ramser Sr. Handicap (2011); Wilshire Handicap (2011); Beverly Hills Handicap (2010); Thunder Road Stakes (2019) UK Group Stakes Wins: Henry II Stakes (2008)

Significant horses
- Firing Line, Dubawi Heights, Abel Tasman, Byrama, Belle Royale, Slim Shadey, Fashion Plate, Finalmente

Simon Anthony Callaghan (born March 7, 1983, in Cambridge, England) is a trainer of Thoroughbred racehorse who moved to the United States in 2009, where he established a racing stable at Santa Anita Park.

Callaghan's father Neville, was a racehorse trainer at Newmarket, where Callaghan got his start assisting his father in various aspects of training. Neville Callaghan trained for thirty-seven years before retiring in 2007, with his best horse probably being Danehill Dancer.
