= Firing Line (horse) =

American-bred Thoroughbred racehorse

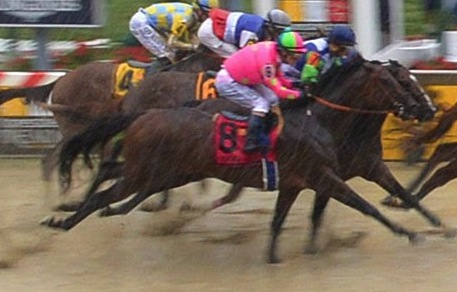
- Firing Line at the Preakness Stakes
- Sire: Line of David
- Grandsire: Lion Heart
- Dam: Sister Girl Blues
- Damsire: Hold For Gold
- Sex: Colt
- Foaled: January 19, 2012
- Country: United States
- Color: Bay
- Breeder: Clearsky Farms
- Owner: Arnold Zetcher
- Trainer: Simon Callaghan
- Record: 7: 2-4-0
- Earnings: $974,800

Major wins
- Sunland Derby (2015)

Firing Line (foaled January 19, 2012) is an American Thoroughbred racehorse, best known as the runner-up to American Pharoah in the 2015 Kentucky Derby.

== Background ==
Firing Line is a bay horse bred in Kentucky by Clearsky Farms, a breeding organization founded by Eamon Cleary and later headed by Cleary's sons Eamonn and Bernard. He is from the first crop of foals sired by Line of David, the winner of the 2010 Arkansas Derby. Firing Line's dam, Sister Girl Blues never won a major race but finished second to Azeri in the 2003 Vanity Handicap. She was bought for $25,000 by Clearsky in January 2011.

Firing Line was sold three times before he appeared on a racetrack. As a foal in November 2012 he was consigned by Paramount Sales to the Keeneland Association sale and bought for $65,000 by GMEN Racing. In July 2014, the yearling was sent to the Fasig-Tipton sale and fetched $150,000, with Bradley Thoroughbreds being the winning bidder. As a two-year-old in training, Firing Line was offered for sale at Keeneland in April 2014. On this occasion the bidding reached $240,000 before he was sold to the bloodstock agent Ben McElroy. The colt entered the ownership of Arnold Zetcher and has been trained throughout his career by the British-born Simon Callaghan.

== Racing career ==
=== 2014: two-year-old season ===
Firing Line began his racing career in a six-furlong maiden race at Santa Anita Park on October 25, 2014. Ridden by Mike Smith, he started favorite but despite finishing strongly he was beaten half a length by Alright Alright. Five weeks later he started 1/2 odds on favorite for a similar event at Del Mar and won by more than four lengths after taking the lead a furlong from the finish. On his final appearance of the year, Firing Line was moved up sharply in class to contest the Grade I Los Alamitos Futurity on December 20. After racing in second place he overtook Mr Z to gain the advantage in the straight but was caught in the final strides and beaten a head by the favored Dortmund.

=== 2015: three-year-old season ===
On his three-year-old debut, Firing Line, ridden by Gary Stevens, contested the Grade III Robert B. Lewis Stakes at Santa Anita on February 7 in which he received five pounds from Dortmund. Firing Line overtook Dortmund on the final turn but was headed again by his rival in the closing stages and beaten a head. After the race, Stevens admitted that he may have made his move too soon. On March 22, Firing Line ran in the Grade III Sunland Derby against six opponents and started 1/5 favorite despite an unfavorable inside draw. He disputed the lead from the start and drew away in the closing stages to win by more than fourteen lengths from Where's The Moon. Callaghan said that the colt "really ran the race he hoped he would... you can't ask more than that" whilst Stevens praised the winner's attitude saying "he probably handled things a lot better than I did. He makes easy work of it and the best thing he's got going for him is his mind".

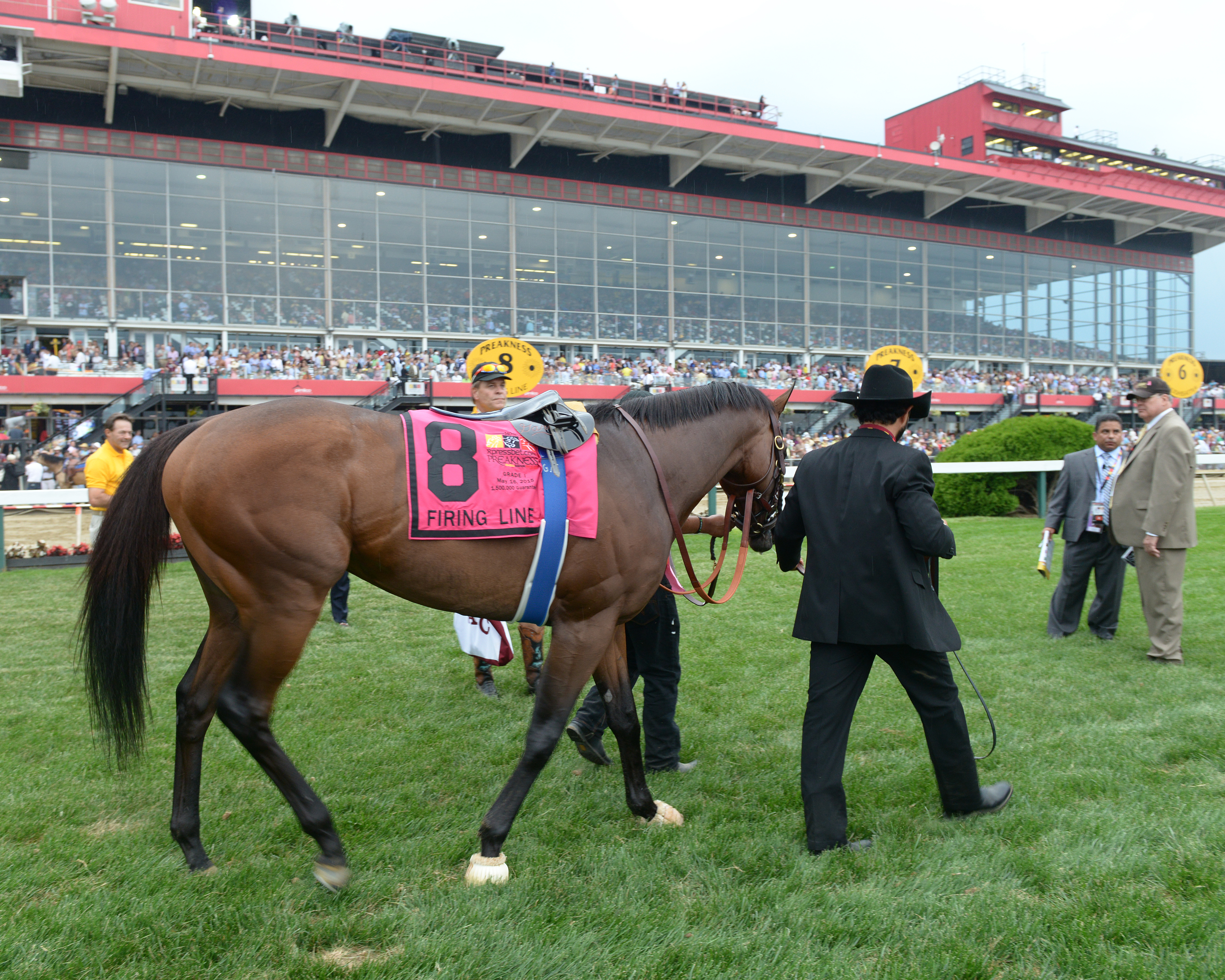
Firing Line before the running of the Preakness Stakes

On May 2, Firing Line contested the 141st running of the Kentucky Derby at Churchill Downs and started 9.5/1 fourth choice in the betting behind American Pharoah, Dortmund and the Blue Grass Stakes winner Carpe Diem. Ridden by Stevens, he tracked Dortmund before moving past his rival to take the lead on the final turn. He looked likely to win before being overtaken inside the final furlong by American Pharoah and finished second, a length behind the winner and two lengths ahead of Dortmund in third. After the race Callaghan said "I'm very proud of how well my horse ran. Gary rode a great race, he had him in the right spot. We just got beat. We tried all the way". Stevens attributed the loss to the colt's failure to change leads in the homestretch. Former jockey and racing commentator Richard Migliore theorized that the "wall of noise" from the Derby crowd unnerved the horse and distracted him from his rider's commands.

Two weeks later, Firing Line met American Pharoah and Dortmund again in the Preakness Stakes at Pimlico Race Course. He started the 3-1 second favorite to the Derby winner on a sloppy track after the course was hit by heavy rain and a thunderstorm. He stumbled exiting the starting gate and never contended, finishing seventh of the eight runners, more than forty lengths behind the winner, American Pharoah. Callaghan commented "he stumbled badly. That took his momentum, and he never really got hold of the track. Nothing went right with all that rain coming." Fellow rival Dortmund also had difficulties in the slop and finished fourth.

== Pedigree ==
Pedigree of Firing Line, bay colt, 2012
Sire Line of David (USA) 2007	Lion Heart (USA); 2001	Tale of the Cat	Storm Cat
Sire Line of David (USA) 2007	Lion Heart (USA); 2001	Tale of the Cat	Yarn
Sire Line of David (USA) 2007	Lion Heart (USA); 2001	Satin Sunrise	Mr Leader
Sire Line of David (USA) 2007	Lion Heart (USA); 2001	Satin Sunrise	Logic
Sire Line of David (USA) 2007	Emma's Dilemma (USA); 2000	Capote	Seattle Slew
Sire Line of David (USA) 2007	Emma's Dilemma (USA); 2000	Capote	Too Bald
Sire Line of David (USA) 2007	Emma's Dilemma (USA); 2000	Kentucky Lill	Raise A Native
Sire Line of David (USA) 2007	Emma's Dilemma (USA); 2000	Kentucky Lill	Lillian Russell
Dam Sister Girl Blues (USA) 1999	Hold For Gold (USA); 1995	Red Ransom	Roberto
Dam Sister Girl Blues (USA) 1999	Hold For Gold (USA); 1995	Red Ransom	Arabia
Dam Sister Girl Blues (USA) 1999	Hold For Gold (USA); 1995	Kydall	Mr Prospector
Dam Sister Girl Blues (USA) 1999	Hold For Gold (USA); 1995	Kydall	North Sider
Dam Sister Girl Blues (USA) 1999	Sister Girl (USA); 1992	Conquistador Cielo	Mr Prospector
Dam Sister Girl Blues (USA) 1999	Sister Girl (USA); 1992	Conquistador Cielo	K D Princess
Dam Sister Girl Blues (USA) 1999	Sister Girl (USA); 1992	Scipio	Danzig
Dam Sister Girl Blues (USA) 1999	Sister Girl (USA); 1992	Scipio	Forli's Key (Family:14)

- Through his dam, Firing Line is inbred 4 x 4 to Mr Prospector, meaning that this stallion appears twice in the fourth generation of his pedigree.
