= Dortmund (horse) =

American-bred Thoroughbred racehorse

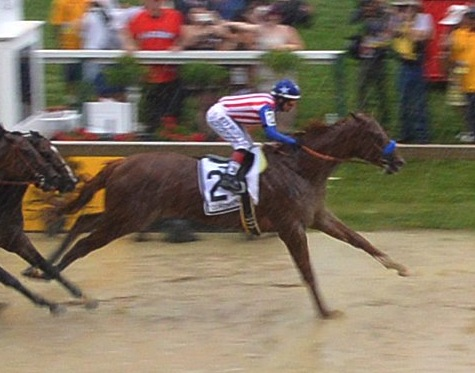
- Dortmund at the Preakness Stakes
- Sire: Big Brown
- Grandsire: Boundary
- Dam: Our Josephina
- Damsire: Tale of the Cat
- Sex: Colt
- Foaled: 7 February 2012
- Country: United States
- Colour: Chestnut
- Breeder: Emilie Gerlinde Fojan
- Owner: Kaleem Shah
- Trainer: Bob Baffert (2014–2016); Art Sherman (2017)
- Record: 16: 8–2–2
- Earnings: $1,987,505

Major wins
- Los Alamitos Futurity (2014); Robert B. Lewis Stakes (2015); San Felipe Stakes (2015); Santa Anita Derby (2015); Native Diver Handicap (2015); Big Bear Stakes

Dortmund (7 February 2012 – April 18, 2022) was an American Thoroughbred racehorse. In 2014, he was undefeated in three races and established himself as one of the best juveniles in California with a win in the Los Alamitos Futurity. In the early part of 2015, he moved into contention for the American Triple Crown races with wins in the Robert B. Lewis Stakes, San Felipe Stakes, and Santa Anita Derby. In his return to racing in the fall of 2015, Dortmund took the Big Bear Stakes and Native Diver Handicap- his final career victories. He died in South Korea on April 18, 2022, at the age of ten, due to colic.

== Background ==
Dortmund is a big chestnut colt with a white sock on his left foreleg, bred in Kentucky by Emilie Gerlinde Fojan. As a three-year-old, he stood 17 hands high. He is from the third crop of foals sired by Big Brown, who won the Kentucky Derby and the Preakness Stakes. Dortmund's dam Our Josephina won three minor races and finished second at grade III level as a four-year-old in 2004. She was descended from Lakeville Miss, whose wins included the CCA Oaks.

Fojan attempted to sell Dortmund as a foal, but he failed to reach his reserve price: she explained, "He was so big; everybody was afraid of his size." In July 2013, the yearling was consigned by Fojan's Bona Terra Stud to the Fasig-Tipton sale and sold for $90,000 to Breaking Point Farm. Ten months later, as a two-year-old, the colt appeared again at Fasig-Tipton and was sold for $140,000 to bloodstock agent Donato Lanni. The horse entered the ownership of entrepreneur Kaleem Shah, who named him in honor of the German soccer team Borussia Dortmund. Dortmund was trained by Bob Baffert (2014–2016) and was ridden in his first seven races by Martin Garcia. He was later trained by Art Sherman.

== Racing career ==
Silks of Kaleem Shah, owner of Dortmund

=== 2014: two-year-old season ===
Dortmund began his racing career in a six and a half furlong maiden race at Santa Anita Park on November 2, 2014. Starting as the favorite against ten opponents, he pulled hard against Garcia's efforts to restrain him before taking the lead approaching the straight and drew away to win by four and three quarter lengths. Four weeks later, the colt started 2/5 favorite in an allowance optional claiming race over a mile at Churchill Downs and won again, beating Silver Ride by seven and three quarter lengths. On December 20, Dortmund was moved up sharply in class to contest the Grade 1 Los Alamitos Futurity over eight and a half furlongs Los Alamitos Race Course and started the 3/5 favorite. Garcia tracked the leaders before making a forward move on the outside entering the straight. He overtook Firing Line in the final strides and won by a head, with Mr Z a neck away in third place. After the race, Baffert, who won the race for the seventh time, said, "He's such a big horse. I wasn't sure how he was going to handle the turns here. He broke well and (Garcia) got him into his own rhythm. He reminds me of Point Given. He's got a good mind, but he's still filling out and he's still learning."

=== 2015: three-year-old season ===
On his three-year-old debut, Dortmund contested the Grade III Robert B. Lewis Stakes at Santa Anita on February 7 in which he conceded five pounds to Firing Line. Dortmund took the lead on the backstretch and rallied after being headed by Firing Line on the final turn to regain the lead in the closing stages and win by a head. Baffert commented, "It looked like that horse was going to go by him, but then he's such a fighter, he just kicked in. You really don't know about these horses until you put them in that scenario, and that's twice now that he just fought and came on to win like that. That was him." Four weeks later, Dortmund started 4/5 favorite for the Grade II San Felipe Stakes at the same track. He took the lead soon after the start, fought off several challengers, and edged away in the straight to win by one and a quarter lengths from Prospect Park. When asked to compare the winner to the Eclipse award winner American Pharoah Baffert said, "It's like asking which kid I love more. They're two different horses." On April 4, Dortmund was stepped up in class and distance for the Grade 1 Santa Anita Derby over nine furlongs and started 3/5 favorite ahead of Prospect Park and four others. He led from the start, went clear of the field in the straight, and won by four and a quarter lengths from his stablemate One Lucky Dane. Garcia commented, "Even though he's won all his races, he's still learning. He can play around a bit, but when someone comes to him, or I ask him to go, he becomes push-button and he just takes off."

On May 2, Dortmund started the 4.3-1 second choice behind his stable companion American Pharoah for the Kentucky Derby. Garcia attempted to win from the front, sending the colt into the lead from the start. Dortmund maintained his advantage until the turn into the straight but was overtaken in the closing stages and finished third behind American Pharoah and Firing Line. Two weeks later, Dortmund met American Pharoah again in the Preakness Stakes at Pimlico Race Course. He was the 4.50-1 third choice behind the Derby top two finishers. The track was very sloppy after being hit by heavy rain and a thunderstorm that began just before the race. Dortmund never was closer than third and finished fourth, fifteen lengths behind American Pharoah.

After a long layoff, Dortmund returned in the fall of 2015. He was dominant over older horses in the Big Bear Stakes at Santa Anita and the G3 Native Diver Stakes at Del Mar.

=== 2016: four-year-old season ===
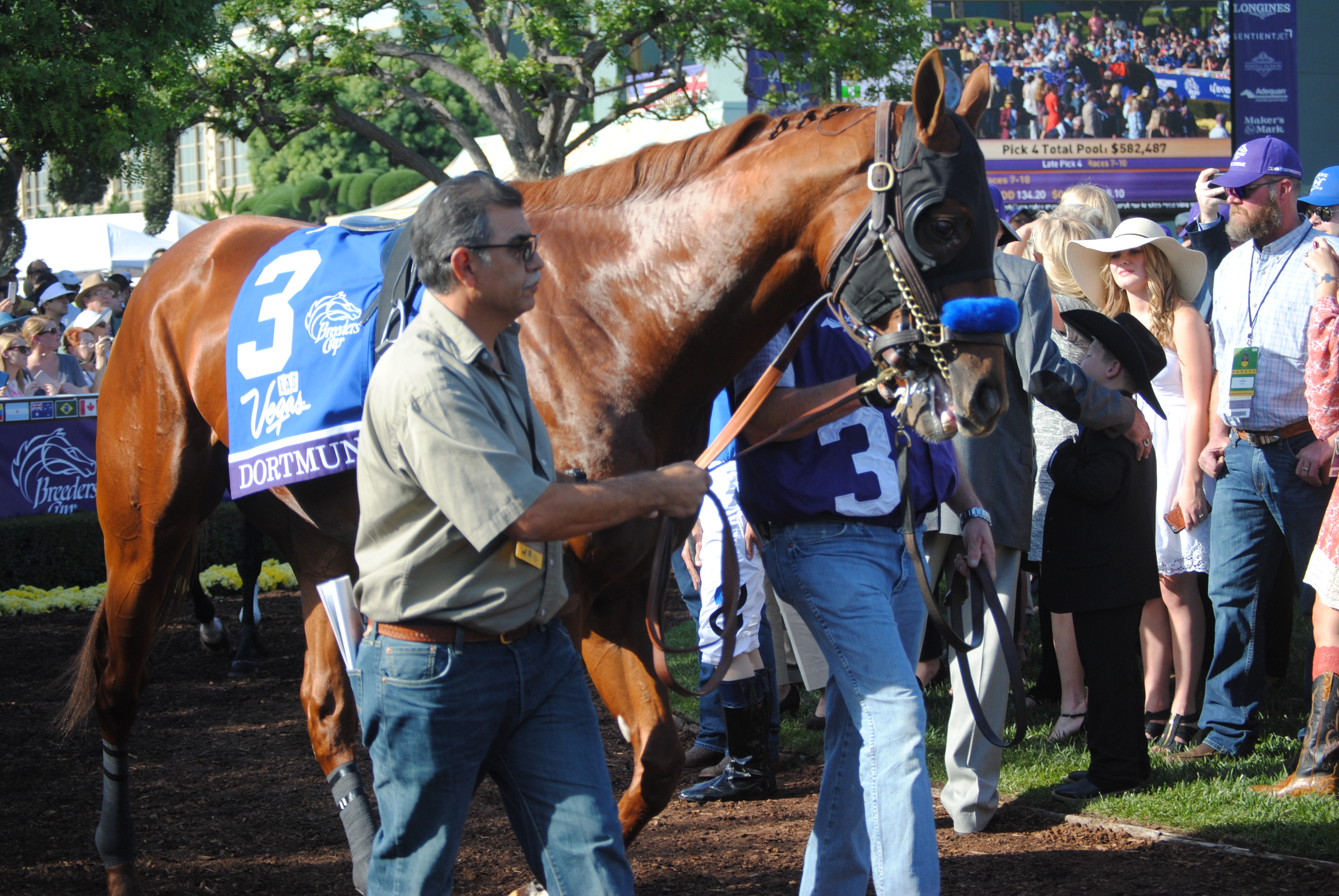
Dortmund at the 2016 Breeders' Cup

Following another lengthy layoff due to foot problems, Dortmund made his 4-year-old debut in the Grade II San Diego Handicap, competing against a talented field that included 2014 Kentucky Derby and Preakness Stakes winner California Chrome. California Chrome tracked behind Dortmund until the far turn, then moved to the front. Dortmund fought back and the two dueled down the stretch, with California Chrome winning by half a length. Rafael Bejarano rode Dortmund for the first time in a rematch at the August 20 Pacific Classic, where he finished third behind California Chrome and the champion mare Beholder. Dortmund faced California Chrome for a third time in the Awesome Again. He pressured California Chrome through fast early fractions but could not keep up while California Chrome drew away around the turn. In the end, Dortmund finished second beaten two and a quarter lengths. Rafael Bejarano stated afterward, "Second-best, no excuses. The winner had a lot of pressure on him and that was the only chance I had. My horse ran good, just second-best." In November, Dortmund was entered in the Breeders' Cup Dirt Mile instead of the longer Breeders' Cup Classic. Although he challenged other horses early on, he faded and finished fourth behind winner Tamarkuz.

=== 2017: five-year-old season ===
On December 31, 2016, it was announced that Kaleem Shah and Bob Baffert were ending their association. As a result, Dortmund was moved to the barn of trainer Art Sherman along with five other Shah-owned horses. His first race of 2017 was the Frank E. Kilroe Mile Stakes on March 11 at Santa Anita Park, in which he finished sixth to the Brazilian-bred horse Bal a Bali. The Kilroe Mile was Dortmund's first race on turf, and he did not show an affinity for the surface, leading his connections to rule out any future turf races. Jockey Victor Espinoza described the horse as "not (comfortable) on the turf."

For his next start, Dortmund was dropped in class to enter the listed Santana Mile Stakes on April 1, also at Santa Anita. In the end, he finished fourth, prompting an announcement from his connections on April 9 that he would be retired to stud and that a stud deal was being negotiated. However, Dortmund returned from retirement in mid-July and began training again at Los Alamitos.

== Retirement ==
Finally, on October 20, 2017, it was announced that Dortmund has been retired "for good" and would stand stallion duties at Bill Boniface's Bonita Farm in Darlington, Maryland. He retired with a record of 16: 8-2-2 with earnings over $1.9 million.

Standing alongside stallions Etched and Mojave Moon, Dortmund's initial stud fee was set for $7,500.

== Race record ==
| Date | Track | Race | Grade | Distance | Finish | Time |
|---|---|---|---|---|---|---|
| 11/2/2014 | Santa Anita Park | Maiden | N/A | 6 1/2 furlongs | 1 | 1:15.87 |
| 11/29/2014 | Churchill Downs | Allowance Optional Claiming | N/A | 1 mile | 1 | 1:35.75 |
| 12/20/2014 | Los Alamitos Futurity | Los Alamitos Futurity | I | 1 1/16 miles | 1 | 1:40.86 |
| 2/7/2015 | Santa Anita Park | Robert B. Lewis Stakes | III | 1 1/16 miles | 1 | 1:42.20 |
| 3/7/2015 | Santa Anita Park | San Felipe Stakes | II | 1 1/16 miles | 1 | 1:41.65 |
| 4/4/2015 | Santa Anita Park | Santa Anita Derby | I | 1 1/8 miles | 1 | 1:48.73 |
| 5/2/2015 | Churchill Downs | Kentucky Derby | I | 1 1/4 miles | 3 | 2:03.02 |
| 5/16/2015 | Pimlico Race Course | Preakness Stakes | I | 1 3/16 miles | 4 | 1:58.46 |
| 10/24/2015 | Santa Anita Park | Big Bear Stakes | Listed | 1 mile | 1 | 1:36.42 |
| 11/28/2015 | Del Mar racetrack | Native Diver Stakes | III | 1 1/8 miles | 1 | 1:48.06 |
| 7/23/2016 | Del Mar racetrack | San Diego Handicap | II | 1 1/16 miles | 2 | 1:40.84 |
| 8/20/2016 | Del Mar racetrack | Pacific Classic | I | 1 1/4 miles | 3 | 2:00:13 |
| 10/1/2016 | Santa Anita Park | Awesome Again | I | 1 1/8 miles | 2 | 1:48.07 |
| 11/4/2016 | Santa Anita Park | Breeders' Cup Dirt Mile | I | 1 mile | 4 | 1:35.72 |
| 3/11/2017 | Santa Anita Park | Frank E. Kilroe Mile Stakes | I | 1 mile | 6 | 1:33.86 |
| 4/1/2017 | Santa Anita Park | Santana Mile Stakes | Listed | 1 mile | 4 | 1:36.76 |

== Pedigree ==
Pedigree of Dortmund (USA), chestnut colt, 2012
| Sire Big Brown (USA) 2005 | Boundary (USA); 1990 | Danzig† | Northern Dancer† |
| Sire Big Brown (USA) 2005 | Boundary (USA); 1990 | Danzig† | Pas de Nom† |
| Sire Big Brown (USA) 2005 | Boundary (USA); 1990 | Edge | Damascus |
| Sire Big Brown (USA) 2005 | Boundary (USA); 1990 | Edge | Ponte Vecchio |
| Sire Big Brown (USA) 2005 | Mien (USA); 1999 | Nureyev | Northern Dancer† |
| Sire Big Brown (USA) 2005 | Mien (USA); 1999 | Nureyev | Special |
| Sire Big Brown (USA) 2005 | Mien (USA); 1999 | Miasma | Lear Fan |
| Sire Big Brown (USA) 2005 | Mien (USA); 1999 | Miasma | Syrian Circle |
| Dam Our Josephina (USA) 2000 | Tale of the Cat (USA); 1994 | Storm Cat | Storm Bird |
| Dam Our Josephina (USA) 2000 | Tale of the Cat (USA); 1994 | Storm Cat | Terlingua |
| Dam Our Josephina (USA) 2000 | Tale of the Cat (USA); 1994 | Yarn | Mr. Prospector |
| Dam Our Josephina (USA) 2000 | Tale of the Cat (USA); 1994 | Yarn | Narrate |
| Dam Our Josephina (USA) 2000 | Ropa Usada (USA); 1989 | Danzig† | Northern Dancer† |
| Dam Our Josephina (USA) 2000 | Ropa Usada (USA); 1989 | Danzig† | Pas de Nom† |
| Dam Our Josephina (USA) 2000 | Ropa Usada (USA); 1989 | Lakeville Miss | Rainy Lake |
| Dam Our Josephina (USA) 2000 | Ropa Usada (USA); 1989 | Lakeville Miss | Hew (Family: 9-c) |

† indicates inbreeding
