= Ibrahim al-Kufahi =

Jordanian academic (born 1967)

- Born: 1 March 1967 (age 58); Irbid, Jordan
- Education: Yarmouk University; University of Jordan
- Occupations: Academic; writer; poet
- Board member of: Jordanian Writers Society; International League of Islamic Literature; Arabic Language International Council
- Website: ibrahimkofahi.site123.me

Ibrahim Mohammed Mahmoud al-Kufahi (Arabic: إبراهيم الكوفحي) is a Jordanian poet, critic and professor. He was born in Irbid, Jordan on March 1, 1967, and it is where he studied. He obtained a degree in Arabic language and literature from Yarmouk University and a master's degree in literature and criticism from the same university. He worked as an Arabic teacher publishing his literary works in Jordanian newspapers and magazines such as Al Ra'i, Yarmouk and Voice of the Generation (original: Sawt Al-Jeel). He has a collection of poetry entitled The Qur’an and Venice (original: al-Qurʼān wa-al-bunduqīyah) (1991) and several other works.

== Early life ==
Ibrahim Mohammed Mahmoud al-Kufahi was born on 1 March 1967 in Irbid, Jordan. He completed his secondary school education at Irbid Secondary School for Boys in 1985 and studied Arabic language and literature at Yarmouk University, earning his bachelor's degree in 1989, master's in 1992 and PhD in literature and modern criticism from the University of Jordan in 1998.

He worked as a lecturer at Tafila College of Engineering (1992-1995), an employee at the Ministry of Higher Education (1995-1996), a lecturer at Hashemite University (HU) (1996–2007), and Vice-Dean of the Faulty of Arts at the same university (2007–2008). In addition, he worked as a lecturer at Umm Al-Qura University, Saudi Arabia in 2008. He is a member of the Jordanian Writers Society, the Jordanian Critics' Association, International League of Islamic Literature, Office of Jordan, Association for Arabic Calligraphy and Islamic Decoration in Irbid, and the Arabic Language International Council in Lebanon. He participated in poetry slams and festivals within Jordan. Moreover, he published several critical and literary articles in Jordanian newspapers and magazines such as Al Ra'i, Yarmouk and Voice of the Generation (original: Sawt Al-Jeel).

== Education ==
- Bachelor's degree: Arabic language and literature, Yarmouk University, Irbid, Jordan, 1989.
- Master's degree: literature and criticism, Yarmouk University, Irbid, Jordan, 1992. Thesis title: The Critique of Al-Rafe'ie. Supervised by Prof. Dr. Khalil Al Shaikh.
- PhD: literature and criticism, University of Jordan, Amman, Jordan, 1998. Thesis title: Mahmoud Mohamed Shaker: The Writer and Critic. Supervised by Prof. Dr. Ibrahim Al Saafin.

== Career ==
- Deputy Dean for Graduate Studies and Scientific Research, University of Jordan, Amman, Jordan (2019–present).
- Head of the Department of Arabic Language and Literature, University of Jordan, Amman, Jordan (2018–2019).
- Professor, Arabic Language and Literature Department, Faculty of Arts, University of Jordan, Amman, Jordan (2013–present).
- Associate Professor - Professor, Department of Literature, Faculty of Arabic Language, Umm Al-Qura University, Mecca (2008–2012).
- Vice-Dean, Faculty of Arts, Hashemite University, Zarqa, Jordan (2007–2008).

== Works ==
=== Books ===
- Mostafa Saadeq Al-Rafe'ie: Critic and Perspective (original: Muṣṭafá Ṣādiq al-Rāfiʻī: al-nāqid wa-al-mawqif), Dar Al Basheer, Amman, Risala Foundation, Beirut, 1st edition, 1997.
- Mahmoud Mohamed Shaker: His Literary Biography and Critical Approach (original: Maḥmūd Muḥammad Shākir: sīratuhu al-adabīyah wa-manhajuhu al-naqdī), Dar Al Basheer, Amman, Risala Foundation, Beirut, 1st edition, 2000. Maktabat al-Khanji, Cairo, 2nd edition, 2008.
- Shuaib Al Arna'ut: Aspects of His Biography and Efforts in Preserving Heritage (original: Shuʻayb al-Arnāʼūṭ: jawānib min sīratih wa-juhūdihi fī taḥqīq al-turāth), Dar Al Basheer, Amman, 2002.
- Poetry of Abdul-Monem al-Rifai (original: Shiʻr ʻAbd al-Munʻim al-Rifāʻī), New Printing & Binding Co., Amman, 2003.
- Mirrors and Shadows: Critical Readings and Reviews (original: Marāyā wa-ẓilāl: qirāʼāt-- wa-murājaʻāt naqdīyah), Ministry of Culture Publications, Amman, 2005.
- Al-Rifai’s Reflections in the Interpretation and Inimitability of the Qur’an (original: Khawāṭir al-Rifāʻī fī Tafsīr al-Qurʼān wa-Iʻjāzh), New Printing & Binding Co., Amman, 2006.
- The Predicament of the Creative: Studies on Writing Poetry (original: Miḥnat al-mubdiʻ: dirāsāt fī ṣiyāghat al-lughah al-shiʻrīyah), Greater Amman Municipality Publications, 2006.
- Love Poems for Amman (original: Qaṣāʼid ḥubb fī ʻAmmān), Greater Amman Municipality Publications, The House of Jordanian Poetry, 2006.
- Collection of Irbid Poetry (original: Dīwān Irbid al-shiʻrī), Ministry of Culture Publications, Amman, 2007.
- Under the Mulberry Tree (original: Taḥta shajarat al-tūt), Collected Poems for Children, Children's Book Series (25), Ministry of Culture, Amman, 2008.
- Glossary of Irbid Writers: The Poets (original: Muʻjam udabāʼ Irbid: al-shuʻarāʼ), Ministry of Culture Publications, Amman, 2008.
- A Reading of the Poetry of Abdul Rahman Baroud (original: Qirāʼah fī shiʻr ʻAbd al-Raḥmān Bārūd), Dar Al-Mamoun for Publishing & Distribution, Amman, 2014.
- Poetic Works (original: al-Aʻmāl al-shiʻrīyah), Dar Al-Isra'a Publishing & Distribution, Amman, 2019.
- Children's and Young Adult Literature (original: Adab al-Ṭifl wa-al-nāshiʼah), Dar Al-Khaleej for Publishing & Distribution, Amman, 2020.
- Sadiq Kharyush: His Life and Poetry (original: Ṣādiq Kharyūsh: ḥatātuhu wa-shiʻruh), Dar Al-Khaleej for Publishing & Distribution, Amman, 2020.

=== Research ===
- Palestine in the Poetry of Yousef Al Azem (original: Filasṭīn fī shiʻr Yūsuf al-ʻAẓm), Dirasat Journal, University of Jordan, Amman, Vol. 27, No. 2, Aug. 2002, pp. 473–418.
- Sadiq Kharyush: His Life and Poetry (original: Ṣādiq Kharyūsh: ḥatātuhu wa-shiʻruh), Dirasat Journal, University of Jordan, Amman, Vol. 29, No. 2, June 2002, (Senior Researcher), pp. 486–512.
- Mostafa Saadeq Al-Rafe'ie and Interpretation of Quranic Verses (original: Muṣṭafá Ṣādiq Rāfiʻī wa-tafsīr al-khiṭāb al-Qurʼānī), Faculty of Arts, Tanta University, May 2006, pp. 181–207.
- Muhammad Huwar: “Varieties: Literary and Critical Readings” (original: Muḥammad Ḥūwar: “Ashtāt: qirāʼāt adabīyah wa-naqdīyah”), Islamic University Journal, Gaza, Humanities Studies Series, Vol. 13, No. 1, January 2005, pp. 45–65.
- Mohammad Jamal Amro's Poems for Children: A Technical Study (original: shiʻr Muḥammad Jamāl ʻAmr lil-aṭfāl: dirāsah fannīyah), Dirasat Journal, Human and Social Sciences, Issued by University of Jordan, Vol. 38, No. 2, 2011.
- Art Form in Abdul Rahman Baroud’s Poetry (original: min ẓawāhir al-tashkīl al-fannī fī shiʻr ʻAbd al-Raḥmān Bārūd), The Journal of Umm Al-Qura University for Language Sciences and Literature, Mecca, 8th edition, May 2012, pp. 83-120.
- Complete Poetic Works of Abdul Rahman Baroud: Methodological Notes (original: al-Aʻmāl al-shiʻrīyah al-kāmilah li-ʻAbd al-Raḥmān Bārūd: mulāhadāt manhajiyah), Journal of Arts and Humanities, Minia University, Egypt, Jan. 2011.
- Verification of Seven Letters (Manuscript) for Abu Fihr Mahmoud Mohammad Shaker, Dirasat Journals, University of Jordan, Amman, Vol. 41, No. 3, 2014.
- Reading Poetry: A Critic's Qualifications and Knowledge of Arab heritage (original: fī qirāʼat al-naṣṣ al-shiʻrī: Muʼahhilāt al-Nāqid wa-thaqāfatihi fī al-turāth al-ʻArabī), edited by: Muqbil Al Daadi, Takween For Studies And Research, United Kingdom, 2016.
- Muhammad Huwar: A Professor and Friend (original: Muḥammad Ḥūwar: ustādhan wa-ṣadīqan), Arwiqa for Research and Publishing, Amman, 1st edition, 2017.
- Estrangement in Jordanian Poetry (original: al-ightirāb fī al-shiʻr al-Urdunī), Islamic University Journal of Humanities Research, Gaza, Palestine, 1st edition (Vol. 29), to be issued in Jan. 2021.

=== Articles ===
- Between Arar and Mustafa Al-Sakran: A Notary Study (original: bayna Arar wa-Muṣṭafá al-Sakrān: dirāsah tawthīqīyah), Al Ra'i newspaper, Friday, 24 Feb. 1989 issue.
- What is Falsely attributed to Arar “Mustafa Wahbi Tal” (original: mā yunsab ḫiṭaʼ ilā Arar “Muṣṭafá Wahbī al-Tall”), Cultural Magazine, issued by University of Jordan, issue 32, 1994.
- Mahmoud Mohamed Shaker and his Professor Al-Rafe'ie (original: Maḥmūd Muḥammad Shākir wa-ustādhihi al-Rāfiʻī), Al-Faisal magazine, issue 232, Mar. 1996.
- Mahmoud Mohamed Shaker in Conversation with Dr. Ihsan Abbas (original: Maḥmūd Muḥammad Shākirfī ḥiwār maʻa al-Duktūr Iḥsān ʻAbbās), Al Ra'i newspaper, Friday, 22 Aug. 1997 issue.
- Artistic Epistles in the Abbasid Period by Dr. Mohammad Mahmoud Al-Droubi, Cultural magazine, issued by University of Jordan, issue 51, Sept. to Dec. 2000.
- “The Sources of Pre-Islamic Poetry and The Historical Value”, Afkar magazine, Ministry of Culture, issue 165, July 2002.
- Differences (original: Al-furuq) by Imam al-Qarafi as a Model, Afkar magazine, issue 181, Nov. 2003.
- “The Cultural Magazine (20th anniversary),” Oct. to Dec. 2003.
- “Historian Suleiman Mousa and The Journey of Creativity,” Afkar magazine, issue 190, Sept. 2004.

== Books and encyclopedias ==
- He edited: Leading Minds and Prominent Personalities in the Field of Literature in Jordan (original: Min aʻlām al-fikr wa-al-adab fī al-Urdun), Hashemite University, Zarqa, Jordan, (22-25 Mar. 2002), Dar Al Basheer, Amman, (publications of the Higher National Committee for selecting Amman as the Arab Capital of Culture for 2002).
- He co-edited: The Concise Palestinian Encyclopedia (original: al-Mawsūʻah al-Filasṭīnīyah al-muyassarah), issued by the panel of Suleiman Arar award for thought and culture, Amman, Jordan, 2012.

== Participation in seminars ==
- Poetry Movement in Jordan: Themes and Aesthetics, moderated by Saleh Yousef Al-Aql, Seminar of the Month, Kuwait magazine, issue 235, 1 May 2003.
- 8th Reading Forum: Biographies in Saudi Literature, dialogue was conducted by Mustafa Muhammed Mustafa, Al Manhal magazine, Jeddah, Saudi Arabia, issue 612, July to Aug. 2008, p. 98.

== Reviews ==
He has reviewed several books and scientific papers for a number of academic and educational institutes, including: University of Jordan, Yarmouk University, Al al-Bayt University, Petra University, Tafila Technical University, Applied Science Private University, University of Bahrain, University of Sharjah, Ministry of Culture (Jordan), Greater Amman Municipality, Ministry of Education (Jordan), Umm Al-Qura University, Umm Al-Qura University Academic Council, Ministry of Higher Education and Scientific Research (Jordan), University of Jordan Language Center, Al-Mustansiriya University – Iraq, University of Tabuk, University of Jeddah, King Abdulaziz University – Jeddah and the Arabic Language International Council in Dubai.

== Awards ==
He was awarded the Higher National Committee Prize for selecting Amman as the Arab Capital of Culture for 2002.
