= Mahmud Bakhith Al Rabii =

Egyptian literary critic

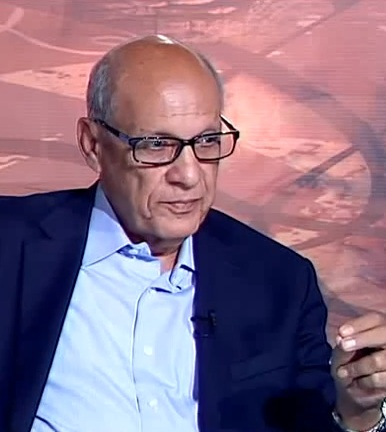
- Mahmud Bakhith Al Rabii, 2015
- Born: January 15, 1932 (age 94); Juhaynah
- Education: Cairo University and University of London
- Occupations: Literary critic and academic
- Organization(s): Egyptian Writers Union, Supreme Council of Culture, Academy of the Arabic Language in Cairo

Mahmoud Bakhith Al Rabii (Arabic: محمود بَخيت الرَّبيعي) is an Egyptian literary critic and academic. He was born on January 15, 1932, in the town of Sohag Governorate, Egypt. He was composing poetry in his youth until 1960, but he then turned to literary criticism. He graduated from Dar al-Ulum university 1958, and obtained his PhD from the University of London in 1965. He taught at the universities of Cairo, Algeria, Kuwait, and the American University in Cairo. He was elected as a member of the Academy of the Arabic Language in Cairo in 2008. He has written publications in criticism, studies, and translations, and he also has a trilogy of biography.

== Biography ==
Mahmud Bakhith Al Rabii was born on January 15, 1932, in the town of Juhaynah, Sohag Governorate, Egypt. His father was a peasant, his mother memorized a portion of the Qur’an, and he is the youngest of seven brothers. He grew up in his hometown right at the age of six in elementary school. At the age of ten he devoted himself to memorizing the Qur’an, and joined the Religious Institute in Asyut in 1945. Then he moved to the Cairo Religious Institute in 1951, and during this period he began writing poetry and publishing it in Al-Zaman and Al-Ahram newspapers. Then he joined Dar al-Ulum University in 1954. He continued writing poetry at Dar al-Ulum, and obtained a BA in 1958, and with the growth of his academic interest in criticism, he stopped writing poetry in 1960. He studied English and entered the University of London in 1960 and obtained a PhD in 1965 with a letter entitled "Women Writers and Critics in Modern Egypt".

== Writing career ==
=== Academic ===
After returning to Egypt in 1965, he became a teacher of modern literary criticism at the Faculty of Dar Al Ulum and published his articles in 1966. In 1972, he was appointed assistant professor of rhetoric and literary criticism at the same faculty, where he has led the department since 1977. His academic career spans the years 1969-1972 while he was a professor at the University of Algiers' Faculty of Arts. He worked at Kuwait University for a couple of years, then returned to his hometown in 1982.

He took part in media seminars as well as literary forums in Cairo. He has been a member of the Egyptian Writers Union since its inception, as well as a member of the Supreme Council of Culture's Poetry Committee and the Assistant Professors Promotion Committee.

He worked at the Faculty of Dar al-Ulum as head of the Department of Rhetoric, Literary Criticism, and Comparative Literature of Cairo University from 1973 to 1986, then at the American University of Cairo from 1998 to 2000 as a professor, and as an authorized representative for the same university between 1982 and 1984. During his time at the Academy of the Arabic Language in Cairo, he was elected a member in 2008 and a vice-president in 2016, and then on March 9, 2020, he was elected again.

==== Literary criticism ====
His contribution to literary criticism began in the mid-1960s and is known as a prominent critic with a distinct approach, which aims to mix textual analysis with the very nature of literary creativity itself. He was known in theoretical criticism more than applied criticism. He believes that the creator who needs a critic who teaches him the origins of his art is doomed to failure sooner or later, and the critic who coordinates with such a creator is a critic who has lost his way.

During his education at the University of London, his experience in Arabic and English literature grew, as well as the crystallization of his idea of linguistic analysis of the literary text, influenced by the writings of T. S. Eliot, which had a profound effect on new criticism and scientific research. In this period, his relationship with linguist El-Said Badawi was strengthened, and he was close to Mahmoud Mohamed Shaker.

After graduating, he became interested in poetry criticism, and in 1962, he translated The Lonely Voice, a study of short story form written by Frank O'Connor. He then contributed a number of articles to the Faculty of Science's publications, including the two magazines "The Majalla" and "Annals". He published his book "Texts of Literary Criticism" in the 1970s and wrote research papers for the magazines "Al Thaqafa", "Al-Kitab", "Al-Hilal", "Al-Mawqif Al-Arabi", "Al-Ahram" and "Al-Akhbar".

== Personal life ==
His father died in 1943, followed by his mother's death in 1954, leaving him with a painful wound. In 1960, he married and moved to Britain to pursue his studies; he has two children, Mai and Amin.

== Awards and honours ==
On May 19, 2009, the Egyptian National Library and Archives held a celebration in his honour.

== Works ==
From his writings on criticism:

- “In Poetry Criticism” (original title: fy nqd alshr), 1968
- “Reading the Novel: Examples from Naguib Mahfouz” (original title: qrat alrwayt: nmadhj mn njyb mhfwz), 1973 ISBN 9772152258
- "Texts of Arabic Criticism" (original title: nsws mn alnqd alrby), 1977
- "Critical Essays" (original title: mqalat nqdyt), 1978
- "Poetry Reading" (original title: qrat alshr), 1983 ISBN 9772152320
- “Of My Banknotes” (original title: mn awraqy alnqdyt), 1996
- “In Literary Criticism and the like” (original title: fy alnqd aladby wma alyh), 2001
- "Within the Limits of Literature" (original title: fy hdwd aladb), 2008

From his translations:

- "The Lonely Voice" (original title: alswt almnfrd), Frank O'Connor, 1969
- "Stream of Consciousness in the Modern Novel" (original title: tyar alwy fy alrwayt alhdytht), 1973
- "Present Literary Criticism" (original title: hadr alnqd aladby), 1975

He also has:

- "At Fifty I Knew My Way: An Autobiography" (original title: fy alkhmsyn arft tryqy: syrt dhatyt), 1991 ISBN 9772154692
- "After 50" (original title: baad alkhmsyn), 2004 ISBN 9772157705
- "My Brother Muhammad Al Rabii: Memories and Selections" (original title: akhy mhmd alrbyy: dhkryat wmkhtarat), 2011
- “My pleasure in writing about language, poetry, criticism and friends” (original title: mtaty fy alktabt an allogha walshr walnqd walasdqa), with Ali Jamal Turki, 2020 ISBN 9789779129280

== See also ==
- El-Said Badawi
- Mahmoud Mohamed Shaker
