= Latifa discography =

This is Latifa's discography in chronological order, most recent releases to older ones.

Note. Translated English titles and Romanization of Arabic and Transliteration by Latifa's official site.

== Releases ==
=== Domestic ===
==== Albums ====
| Year | Title | Arabic script |
|---|---|---|
| 2009 | Atahadda (I challenge) | أتحدى |
| 2008 | Fil Kam Yom Illi Fato (In The Past Few Days) | في الكام يوم اللي فاتوا |
| 2007 | Ma'alomat Akeeda (Definite information) | معلومات أكيدة |
| 2003 | Ma Etrohsh Ba'ed (Don't go away) | ما تروحش بعيد |
| 1999 | Wadeh (Clear/Honest) | واضح |
| 1998 | Taloomoni Al Donya (The world blame me) | تلومني الدنيا |
| 1997 | Al Ghinwa (The song) | الغنوة |
| 1996 | Ma Wahashtaksh? (Did you miss me?) | ما وحشتكش؟ |
| 1995 | Wa Akheeran (At last) | و أخيراً |
| 1994 | Ana Ma Atniseesh (I am unforgettable) | أنا ما أتنسيش |
| 1993 | Hobbak Hadi (Frigid love) | حبك هادي |
| 1992 | Al Donya Betedh'hak Leya (The world smiles to me) | الدنيا بتضحك ليا |
| 1990 | Waih Waih (Ahh) | ويه ويه |
| 1990 | Bil Aql Keda (Come in sense) | بالعقل كده |
| 1989 | Ashan Bahibbal (Because I love you) | عشان بحبك |
| 1988 | Akthar Min Roohi Bahibbak (More than my soul I love you) | اكثر من روحي بحبك |
| 1988 | Dalleltni (You've cuddled me) | دللتني |
| 1987 | Meen Yeqol? (Who says?) | مين يقول؟ |
| 1987 | Ya Hayati Ana (My life) | يا حياتي أنا |
| 1986 | Ma Laqtsh Methalak - Ma Banamsh Al Lail (Never found someone like you - I don't sleep in the night) | ما لقتش مثالك - ما بنامش الليل |
| 1985 | Andak Shak? (Do you have doubt?) | ?عندك شك |

==== Singles ====
| Year | Title | Arabic script |
|---|---|---|
| N/A | Hat Qalbi Wo Rooh (Return my heart then leave) | هات قلبي و روح |
| N/A | Ala La Towadi'oni Habeebi (My beloved one, don't farewell me) | ألا لا تودعني حبيبي |

==== Featured in ====
| Year | Title | Arabic script | Info. |
|---|---|---|---|
| 2008 | Al Dhameer Al Arabi operetta | ليالي المندلون | Performed a part of the operetta with other artists |
| N/A | Arabian Romance | رومانسيات عربية | Track Badoob (Arabic: بدوب) I am melting |
| 2005 | Viva Arabia 4 | فيفا أرابيا 4 | Tracks Medardarah (Arabic: مدردره) Messed up and Khalleouni (Arabic: خلوني) Let me |
| 2001 | Mandaloun Nights | ليالي المندلون | Track Tehwani (Arabic: تهواني) You like me |
| N/A | Lotfi Wa Latifa | لطفي و لطيفة | Track Al Soboh Daq Al Bab (Arabic: الصبح دق الباب) In the morning, he knocked on the door |

==== Soundtracks ====
| Year | Title | Arabic script | Info. |
|---|---|---|---|
| 2004 | Hokom Al Ro'ayan (Reign of the shepherds) | حكم الرعيان | Sound tracks of a musical play |
| 2001 | Sokoot...Ha Ensawwar (Silence...we're rolling) | سكوت...ح نصور | Sound tracks of a musical movie |

=== International ===
==== Albums ====
Album Inchallah released in 1999, the other albums released earlier in the Arab world and they were re-distributed internationally in the year 2000.

| Year | Title | Info. |
|---|---|---|
| 2007 | Maaloumet Akida (Definite information) | International version released by Universal Music on December 3, 2007 while Arabic version released few days before the end of the year 2006. The international version includes two bonus tracks in both Arabic and French. |
| 1999 | Inchallah | Arab edition of the album released in the exact year titled Wadeh |
| 2000 | Ma Wahashtaksh : Love songs? | Arab edition of the album released in 1996 |
| 2000 | Wa Akheeran | Arab edition of the album released in 1995 |
| 2000 | Ana Ma Atniseesh | Arab edition of the album released in 1994 |
| 2000 | Hobbak Hadi | Arab edition of the album released in 1993 |

==== Singles ====
| Year | Title |
|---|---|
| 2000 | Inchallah CD single |

==== Collections ====
| Year | Title | Info. |
|---|---|---|
| 2004 | Les Plus Belles Chansons De Latifa | Collection of Latifa's songs, including video edition of the song Khalleouni. Note. Extended edition of Khalleouni released in the album Viva Arabia 4. |
| 1999 | Latifa Profile | Collection of Latifa's songs |
| N/A | Mes plus belles chansons d'amour | Collection of Latifa's songs. |

==== Featured in ====
| Year | Title | Info. |
|---|---|---|
| 2007 | Bellydance Superstars: Babelesque | Track Wadah |
| 2007 | Belly Bar | Track Mektoub |
| 2006 | Desert Roses 4 | Track Khalleouni (Music video edition) |
| 2006 | Oriental Garden, Vol. 4 | Track Habibi Matrohsh Beed |
| 2006 | Best Arabian Nights Album in the World Ever, Vol. 6 | Track Khalouny |
| 2006 | A Musical Journey Around the Mediterranean Sea | Track Habibi Matrohsh Baeed |
| 2005 | The Best Arabian Nights Party 2005...Ever! | Track Habibi Matrohsh Baeed |
| 2002 | Desert Roses 2 | Track Take Me I'm Yours, Latifa FEAT. Chris Difford and Glenn Tilbrook of Squeeze |
| 2001 | Desert Roses & Arabian Rhythms | Track Inchallah |
| 2000 | Etre Femme | Track Inchallah |
| 2001 | Arabian Legends: Past to Present | Track Lamma Ygeeboo Seertak |
| 2001 | Absolute Oriental | Tracks Ashan Bahebak, Ghidart Bea and Mawhshtaksh |
| 2001 | Deep Soul: New Tarab | Track Ya Seedee Massee |
| 2001 | From Maghreb to Mashreq | Track Ya Sidy Masi |
| 2000 | From Cairo to Casablanca | Track Lamma Yegeeboo Seertak |

==== Soundtracks ====
| Year | Title | Info. |
|---|---|---|
| 2001 | Silence... on tourne (Silence...we're rolling) | Sound tracks of a musical movie |

== Unofficial releases ==
- 1990s Al Himma Al Himma (Arabic: الهمة الهمة) Keep up
- 1990s Ya Ordon Al Ajwad (Arabic: يا أردن الأجواد) To Jordan
- 1998 Al Hilm Al Arabi (Arabic: الحلم العربي) The Arab Dream Latifa FEAT. others
- 2000 French version of the song Wadeh
- 2001 Quand On n'a Que l'Amour (Jacques Brel's song)
- 2000s (decade) Eradart Al Hayah (Arabic: إرادة الحياة) Will to life
- 2002 Ela Toghat Al Alaam (Arabic: إلى طغاة العالم) To the tyrants of the world
- 2003 Medardarah (Arabic: مدردره) Messed up
- 2003 Ten religious songs
- 2006 Ashoofik (Arabic: أشوفك) When I see you
- 2006 Al Defa (Arabic: الدفا) The warmth
- 2006 Mashyat Marid (Arabic: مشية مارد) Walk like an ogre (Patriotic song dedicated to Lebanon, Iraq & Palestine)

Note. 2006 Track Tehwani (Arabic: تهواني) You like me, released officially in the album Mandaloun Nights against Latifa's wish, that's why she consider it unofficial release.

- 2007 Watani (Arabic: وطني) My homeland (Patriotic song)

== See also ==
- Latifa
- Latifa videography
- Ila Tughat al-Alam
- Arabic pop
- Arabic music
- Raï
