= Latifa videography =

Latifa released more than 40 music videos, one movie, one play and appeared as herself in the Arabic version "Lahathat Harijah" (لحظات حرجة) of the TV show ER.

This is Latifa's videography in chronological order, most recent releases to older ones.

Note. Translated English titles and Romanization of Arabic and Transliteration by Latifa's official site.

== 2010 production ==
Title Transliteration Arabic script English translation	Album name Transliteration Arabic script English translation	Director	Info.
Atahadda أتحدى (I challenge)	Atahadda أتحدى (I challenge)	Nahla Al Fahad نهلة الفهد	Shooting location: Dubai
Kil Wahid كل واحد (Everyone)	Atahadda أتحدى (I challenge)	Nahla Al Fahad نهلة الفهد	Shooting location: Dubai
Zid Ala Narak Hatab زد على نارك حطب (Add wood to your fire)	single	Nahla Al Fahad نهلة الفهد	Shooting location: UAE
Mamlooh مملوح (Cute)	Atahadda أتحدى (I challenge)	Nahla Al Fahad نهلة الفهد	Shooting location: Dubai

== 2009 production ==
Title Transliteration Arabic script English translation	Album name Transliteration Arabic script English translation	Director	Info.
Roohi Betrod Fiyya روحي بترد فيا (My soul returns to me)	Fil Kam Yom Illi Fato في الكام يوم اللي فاتوا (In the past few days)	Nahla Al Fahad نهلة الفهد	Shooting location: Qatar
Ana Arfa انا عارفة (I Know)	Fil Kam Yom Illi Fato في الكام يوم اللي فاتوا (In the past few days)	Nahla Al Fahad نهلة الفهد	Shooting location: Qatar
Sebni Showayah سيبني شوية (Leave me for a while)	Fil Kam Yom Illi Fato في الكام يوم اللي فاتوا (In the past few days)	Nahla Al Fahad نهلة الفهد	Shooting location: UAE
Law Fakir لو فاكر (If you remember)	Fil Kam Yom Illi Fato في الكام يوم اللي فاتوا (In the past few days)	Nahla Al Fahad نهلة الفهد	Shooting location: Dubai, UAE

== 2008 production ==
Title Transliteration Arabic script English translation	Album name Transliteration Arabic script English translation	Director	Info.
Fil Kam Yom Illi Fato في الكام يوم اللي فاتوا (In the past few days)	Fil Kam Yom Illi Fato في الكام يوم اللي فاتوا (In the past few days)	Stephan Leonardo	Shooting location: France

== 2007 production ==
Title Transliteration Arabic script English translation	Album name Transliteration Arabic script English translation	Director	Info.
Ammnli Bait أمنلي بيت (Secure me a house)	Ma'alomat Akeeda معلومات أكيدة (Definite information)	Randa Chahal رندة شهال	Shooting location: Lebanon
El Houma Al Arabi الحومة العربي (Arab neighborhood)	Ma'alomat Akeeda (International edition) معلومات أكيدة (النخسة العالمية) (Definite information)	Fabian Raymond	Shooting location: Outdoor in Dar Al Jild, Tunisia
Ashqana عشقانة (I'm in love)	Ma'alomat Akeeda معلومات أكيدة (Definite information)	Said El Marouk سعيد الماروق	Shooting location: Outdoor in Egypt
Shofto Be Aini شفته بعيني (I saw him with my own eyes)	Ma'alomat Akeeda معلومات أكيدة (Definite information)	Said El Marouk سعيد الماروق	Shooting location: Studio in Lebanon

== 2006 production ==
Title Transliteration Arabic script English translation	Album name Transliteration Arabic script English translation	Director	Info.
Be Nos Al Jaw بنص الجو (In the mood)	Ma'alomat Akeeda معلومات أكيدة (Definite information)	Said El Marouk سعيد الماروق	Shooting location: Lebanon
Mashyat Marid (aka Waqfat Ez) مشية مارد أو وقفة عز (Walk like an ogre aka Courageous stand)	Audio track was never released officially	N/A	Montage of Latifa while she was recording the song in a studio in Egypt with scenes of Israel-Lebanon 2006 war, the song is dedicated to Lebanon, Palestine and Iraq
Al Defa الدفا (The warmth)	Audio track was never released officially	N/A	Shooting location: Oman
Ashoofak اشوفك (When I see you)	Audio track was never released officially	N/A	Shooting location: Studio in Tunisia

== 2005 production ==
Title Transliteration Arabic script English translation	Album name	Director	Info.
Khalleouni خلوني او خليوني (Let me)	Les Plus Belles Chansons De Latifa	Stéphane Lionardo	Shooting location: Tunisia & France Extended version of the audio track released in the album Viva Arabia 4

== 2003 production ==
Title Transliteration Arabic script English translation	Album name Transliteration Arabic script English translation	Director	Info.
Ma Etrohsh Ba'ed ما تروحش بعيد (Don't go away)	Ma Etrohsh Ba'ed ما تروحش بعيد (Don't go away)	Stéphane Lionardo	Shooting location: South of France
Medardarah مدردره (Messed up)	Audio track was never released officially	Saleem El Turk سليم الترك	Shooting location: Studio in Lebanon; Extended version of the audio track released in the album Viva Arabia 4. Song was shot and dedicated to Iraq before the American invasion of Iraq.

== 2002 production ==
Title Transliteration Arabic script English translation	Album name Transliteration Arabic script English translation	Director	Info.
Ela Toghat Al Alaam (To the tyrants of the world)	Audio track was never released officially	Mohammed Bakeer محمد بكير	Shooting location: Studio in Egypt, song is a tribute to Palestine and it is a message to George W. Bush and Israel.

== 1999 - 2000 production ==
Title Transliteration Arabic script English translation	Album name Transliteration Arabic script English translation	Director	Info.
Inchallah (Inshallah or Inshalla) إنشالله (God willing)	Wadeh aka Inchallah واضح أو إنشالله; Clear/Honest aka God willing	N/A	Shooting location: Hammamet, Tunisia; Remixed version was montaged differently
Wadeh واضح (Clear/Honest)	Wadeh aka Inchallah واضح أو إنشالله; Clear/Honest aka God willing	Marwan Al Toni مروان التوني	Shooting location: Studio in Egypt
Rihlat Al Zaman رحلة الزمان (Journey through time)	Wadeh aka Inchallah واضح أو إنشالله; Clear/Honest aka God willing	Mohammad Bakeer محمد بكير	Shooting location: France
Yalla Inghanny (aka Chanton L'amour) يلا نغني (Let's sing)	Wadeh aka Inchallah واضح أو إنشالله; Clear/Honest aka God willing	Mohammad Bakeer محمد بكير	Shooting location: Pyramids of Giza, Egypt
Kerehtak كرهتك (I hated you)	Wadeh aka Inchallah واضح أو إنشالله; Clear/Honest aka God willing	Mohsin Ahmad محسن أحمد	Shooting location: Studio and outdoor by the Pyramids and Sphinx of Egypt
Ajjalt Ihmoomi أجلت همومي (I postponed my agony)	Wadeh aka Inchallah واضح أو إنشالله; Clear/Honest aka God willing	Bassim Christo باسم كريستو	Shooting location: Studio in Lebanon Video was banned by Latifa

== 1998 production ==
Title Transliteration Arabic script English translation	Album name Transliteration Arabic script English translation	Director	Info.
Taloomoni Al Donya تلومني الدنيا (The world blames me)	Taloomoni Al Donya تلومني الدنيا (The world blames me)	Tariq Al Aryan طارق العريان	Shooting location: Madinat Al Entaj Al E'elami, Egypt
Beyinso بينسوا او بينسو (They forgot)	Taloomoni Al Donya تلومني الدنيا (The world blames me)	Mazen Al Jabali مازن الجبلي	Shooting location: United States. Shooting of the music video begun in the year 1998 but the music video completed in the year 2000.
Ya Ghaddar يا غدار (Betrayer)	Taloomoni Al Donya تلومني الدنيا (The world blames me)	Mazen Al Jabali مازن الجبلي	Shooting location: Florida, United States
Baini Wo Bainkom بيني و بينكم (Just between me and you)	Taloomoni Al Donya تلومني الدنيا (The world blames me)	Mazen Al Jabali مازن الجبلي	Shooting location: New York, United States
Al Ensan aka Man Yonqith Al Ensan? الإنسان أو من ينقذ الإنسان؟ (The human being aka Who will save the human being?)	Taloomoni Al Donya تلومني الدنيا (The world blames me)	Mazen Al Jabali مازن الجبلي	Shooting location: Shooting of the music video begun in the year 1998 but the music video completed in the year 2000. Location: United Nations H.Q. New York, United States, South of Lebanon, Golan Heights, Syria. Song was dedicated to Muhammad al-Durrah.

Note. That year Latifa shoot two more music videos of the songs "Khaleek Ba'ed" (Arabic: خليك بعيد) Translation: Keep away and the song "Ha Yeteeb Al Jarh" (Arabic: ح يطيب الجرح) Translation: My wound will heel but they were never released since Latifa had a nervous breakdown.

== 1997 production ==
Title Transliteration Arabic script English translation	Album name Transliteration Arabic script English translation	Director	Info.
Al Ghenwa الغنوة او الغنوه (The song)	Al Ghenwa الغنوة (The song)	Mohsin Ahmad محسن أحمد	Shooting location: Egypt
Hamasooli همسوالي او همسولي (They whispered me)	Al Ghenwa الغنوة (The song)	N/A	Shooting location: Tunisia
Et'aziz إتعزز (Be stubborn)	Al Ghenwa الغنوة (The song)	N/A	Shooting location: Egypt
Nar نار (Fire)	Al Ghenwa الغنوة (The song)	Tariq Al Aryan طارق العريان	Shooting location: Egypt
Ghadart Bi غدرت بي (You've betrayed me)	Al Ghenwa الغنوة او الغنوه (The song)	N/A	Shooting location: Egypt

== 1996 production ==
Title Transliteration Arabic script English translation	Album name Transliteration Arabic script English translation	Director	Info.
Ma Wahashtaksh?! ما وحشتكش؟! (Did you miss me?!)	Ma Wahashtaksh؟!?! ما وحشتكش؟! (Did you miss me?!)	Mazen Al Jabali مازن الجبلي	Shooting location: Egypt
Balash Terja'a بلاش ترجع (Don't come back)	Ma Wahashtaksh؟! ما وحشتكش؟! (Did you miss me?!)	N/A	Shooting location: Egypt
Istihala إستحالة (Impossible)	Ma Wahashtaksh؟! ما وحشتكش؟! (Did you miss me?!)	Mohsin Ahmad محسن أحمد	Shooting location: Alexandria, Egypt
Hassib حاسب (Be ware)	Ma Wahashtaksh؟! ما وحشتكش؟! (Did you miss me?!)	N/A	N/A
Ya Hayati يا حياتي (My life)	Ma Wahashtaksh؟! ما وحشتكش؟! (Did you miss me?!)	Enas Al Degheedi ايناس الدغيدي	Shooting location: Al Ghardaqah, Egypt
Ya Seedi Massi يا سيدي مسي (Say hi)	Ma Wahashtaksh؟! ما وحشتكش؟! (Did you miss me?!)	Enas Al Degheedi ايناس الدغيدي	Shooting location: Jeita Grotto, Lebanon
Fe Yoom Wahid في يوم واحد او ف يوم واحد (In one day)	Ma Wahashtaksh؟! ما وحشتكش؟! (Did you miss me?!)	Tariq Al Kashif طارق الكاشف	N/A

== 1995 production ==
Title Transliteration Arabic script English translation	Album name Transliteration Arabic script English translation	Director	Info.
Wo Ahkeeran - First edition و أخيراً - النسخة الأولى (At last)	Wo Ahkeeran و أخيراً (At last)	Tariq Al Kashif طارق الكاشف	Shooting location: Studio in Egypt
Wo Ahkeeran - Second edition و أخيراً - النسخة الثانية (At last)	Wo Ahkeeran و أخيراً (At last)	Tariq Al Kashif طارق الكاشف	Shooting location: Outdoor in Tunisia
Al Mawdo'a Mintihi الموضوع منتهي (Subject is closed)	Wo Ahkeeran و أخيراً (At last)	N/A	Shooting location: Tunisia
In Kan Al Bo'ad إن كان ع البعد (It's not about leaving)	Wo Ahkeeran و أخيراً (At last)	Tariq Al Kashif طارق الكاشف	Shooting location: Desert of Egypt
Ana Qalbi Aleel أنا قلبي عليل (I have a heartache)	Wo Ahkeeran و أخيراً (At last)	Tariq Al Kashif طارق الكاشف	N/A
Al Haq Haq الحق حق (Fair is fair)	Wo Ahkeeran و أخيراً (At last)	Tariq Al Kashif طارق الكاشف	N/A
Fe Gheyabak Anni ف غيابك عني او في غيابك عني (During your absence)	Wo Ahkeeran و أخيراً (At last)	Tariq Al Kashif طارق الكاشف	N/A

== 1994 production ==
Title Transliteration Arabic script English translation	Album name Transliteration Arabic script English translation	Director	Info.
Ana Ma Atniseesh أنا ماتنسيش (I'm unforgettable)	Ana Ma Atniseesh أنا ماتنسيش (I'm unforgettable)	Tariq Al Kashif طارق الكاشف	Shooting location: Egypt
Lamma Yejebo Sertak لما يجيبوا سيرتك (When they talk about you)	Ana Ma Atniseesh أنا ماتنسيش (I'm unforgettable)	N/A	N/A
Al Khoof الخوف (Fear)	Ana Ma Atniseesh أنا ماتنسيش (I'm unforgettable)	Tariq Al Kashif طارق الكاشف	Shooting location:Outdoor, Tunisia
Ana Qad Ma Ahibbak أنا قد ما أحبك (As much as I love you)	Ana Ma Atniseesh أنا ماتنسيش (I'm unforgettable)	Tariq Al Kashif طارق الكاشف	N/A
Thani Wo Thalith Wo Rabi'e ثاني و ثالث و رابع أو تاني و تالت و رابع (Once & again)	Ana Ma Atniseesh أنا ماتنسيش (I'm unforgettable)	Tariq Al Kashif طارق الكاشف	N/A
Katabtilak كتبتلك (I wrote to you)	Ana Ma Atniseesh أنا ماتنسيش (I'm unforgettable)	Atif Al Tayyib عاطف الطيب	Location: Egypt
Mosh Ha Etlaqi مش ح تلاقي (You will never find)	Ana Ma Atniseesh أنا ماتنسيش (I'm unforgettable)	N/A	N/A
Mit'hakkim Wo Enta Ba'ed متحكم و انت بعيد (You are controlling me while you are away)	Ana Ma Atniseesh أنا ماتنسيش (I'm unforgettable)	N/A	N/A

== 1993 production ==
Title Transliteration Arabic script English translation	Album name Transliteration Arabic script English translation	Director	Info.
Bahhib Fe Gharamak بحب ف غرامك (What I love about you)	Hobbak Hadi حبك هادي (Frigid love)	N/A	N/A
Hobbak Hadi حبك هادي (Your love is frigid)	Hobbak Hadi حبك هادي (Frigid love)	N/A	N/A
Beyihsibooni بيحسبوني او بيحسبواني (They thought)	Hobbak Hadi حبك هادي (Frigid love)	N/A	N/A
Hayyarni حيرني (Confuse me)	Hobbak Hadi حبك هادي (Frigid love)	N/A	N/A
Zai Al Bahr زي البحر (Like the sea)	Hobbak Hadi حبك هادي (Frigid love)	N/A	N/A
Omri Ma Asadda'q عمري ما أصدق (I will never believe)	Hobbak Hadi حبك هادي (Frigid love)	N/A	N/A

== Unknown years of production ==
Title Transliteration Arabic script English translation	Album name Transliteration Arabic script English translation	Director	Info.
Ashan Bahibbak عشان بحبك (Because I love you)	Ashan Bahibbak عشان بحبك (Because I love you)	N/A	N/A
Bahibbak Badalak بحبك بدالك	Akthar Min Roohi Bahibbak أكثر من روحي بحبك (More than my soul I love you)	N/A	N/A
Asalhak Wo Malo اصالحك و ماله (I make up with you)	Bil Aql Keda بالعقل كده (Come in sense)	N/A	N/A
Ew'ah Tegheer إوعى تغير (Don't be jealous)	Akthar Min Roohi Bahibbak اكثر من روحي بحبك (More than my soul I love you)	N/A	N/A
Al Donya Betedh'hak Leya الدنيا بتضحك ليا (The world laughs to me)	Al Donya Betedh'hak Leya الدنيا بتضحك ليا (The world laughs to me)	N/A	N/A
Eddeeni Forsah Thanyah إديني فرصة ثانية (Give me a second chance)	Bil Aql Keda بالعقل كده (Come in sense)	N/A	N/A
Et'hadda إتحدى (Challenge)	Audio track never released officially	N/A	N/A
Dimashq دمشق (Damascus)	Audio track never released officially	N/A	N/A

== See also ==
- Latifa
- Latifa discography
