= Aboul-Qacem Echebbi =

Tunisian poet (1909–1934)

- أبو القاسم الشابي
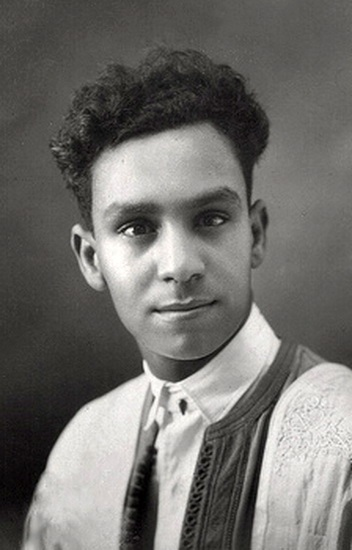
- Born: 24 February 1909; Tozeur, French Tunisia
- Died: 9 October 1934 (aged 25); Tunis, French Tunisia
- Resting place: Mausoleum of Abou El Kacem Chebbi, Tozeur
- Occupation: Poet
- Spouse: Lella Chahla (Chahla Echebbi) (m. 1929)
- Children: 2 boys
- Relatives: Fadela Echebbi (cousin) Lamine Chebbi (brother) Abdelhamid Chebbi (brother)
- Writing career
- Movements: Neo-romanticism, avant-garde, Apollo Society

Aboul-Qacem Echebbi (Arabic: أبو القاسم الشابي, Abūl-Qāsim aš-Šhābbī; 24 February 1909 – 9 October 1934) was a Tunisian poet. He is probably best known for writing the final two verses of the current national anthem of Tunisia, "Ḥumāt al-Ḥimā", which was originally written by the Egyptian poet Mustafa Sadik el-Rafii.

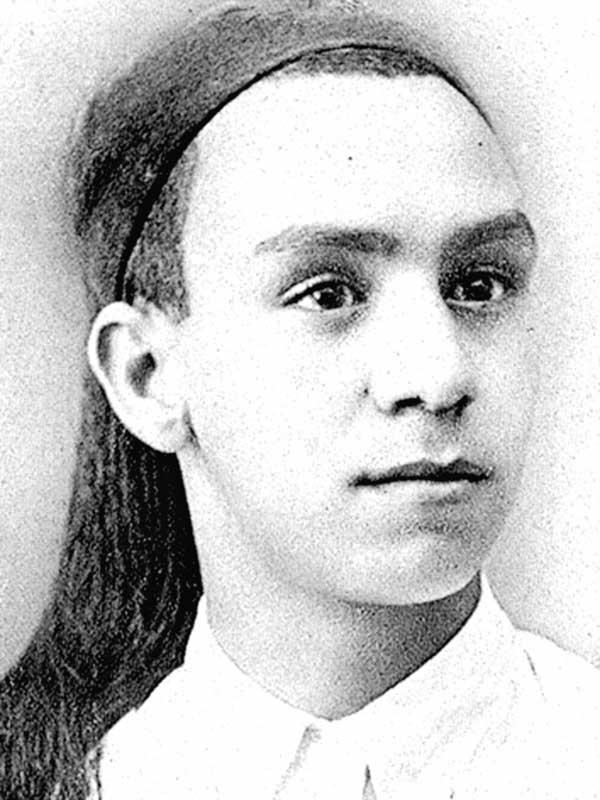
Aboul-Qacem Echebbi

== Life ==
Echebbi was born in Tozeur, Tunisia, on 24 February 1909, the son of a judge. He obtained his attatoui diploma (the equivalent of the baccalauréat) in 1928. In 1930, he obtained a law diploma from the University of Ez-Zitouna. The same year, he married Chahla Echebbi who was his cousin and subsequently had two sons, Mohamed Sadok, who became a colonel in the Tunisian army, and Jelal, who later became an engineer.

He was very interested in modern literature in particular, and translated romantic literature, as well as old Arab literature. His poetic talent manifested itself at an early age and this poetry covered numerous topics, from the description of nature to patriotism. His poems appeared in the most prestigious Tunisian and Middle-Eastern reviews. Influences of his include Amin al-Rihani and Jubran Khalil Jubran. Among his most influential works, two of his poems, To the tyrants of the world and The Will to Live (written 1933), became popular slogans chanted during the 2011 Tunisian and subsequently Egyptian and wider Arab world demonstrations.

In the early 1930s, Echebbi was part of a group of artists and intellectuals whose work was deeply inflected with nationalist politics coming to the fore at the time. They met in the Medina of Tunis and became known as Taht al-sur (literally "Under the Wall"). They "wanted to create a literary cultural milieu that built national character, denounced colonialism, and promoted social and economic justice."

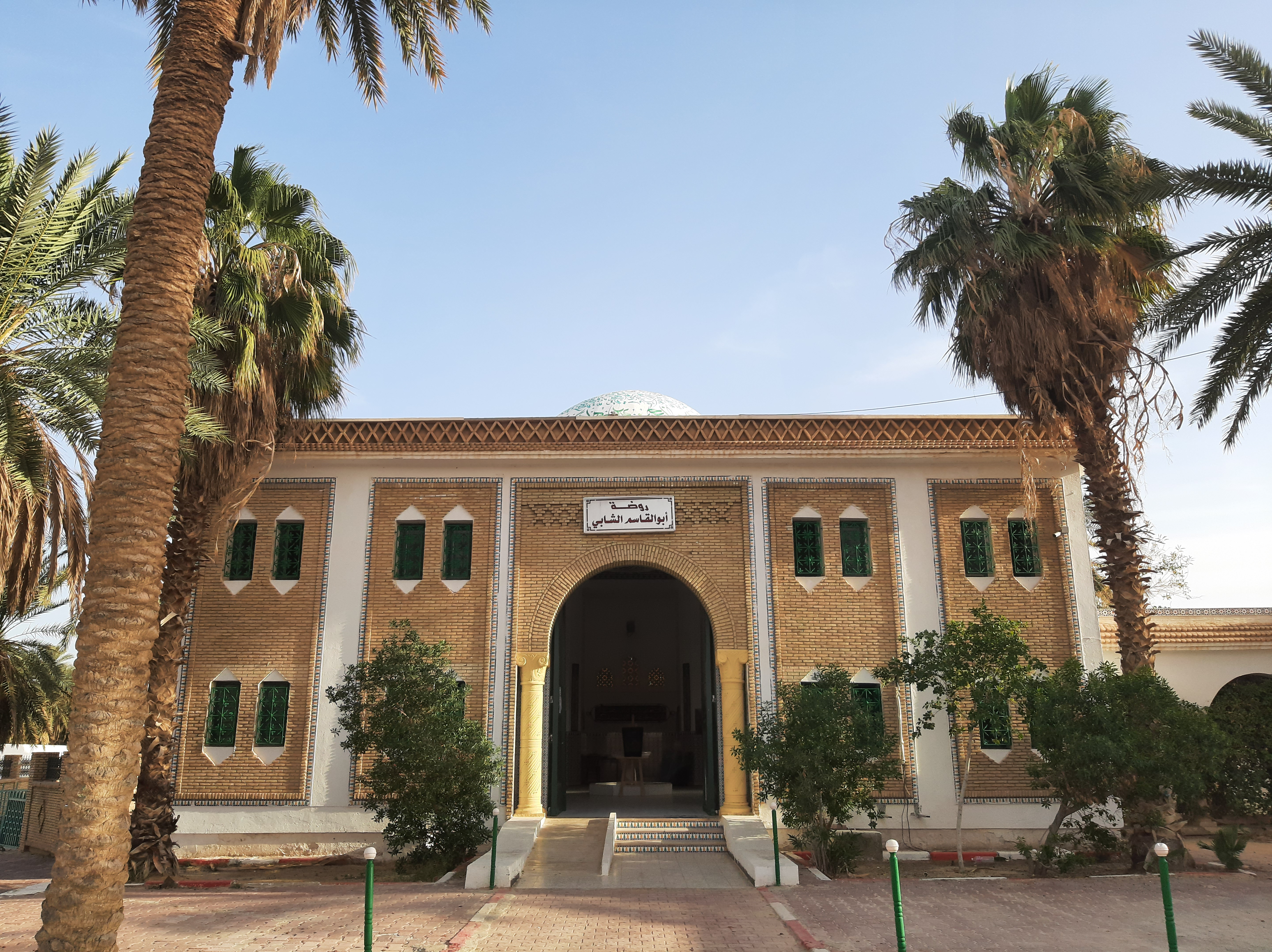
Mausoleum of Abou El Kacem Chebbi

Echebbi died on 9 October 1934 at the current Habib-Thameur Hospital in Tunis, (formerly "Italian Hospital"), following a long history of cardiac disorders (Myocarditis). His portrait is on the current 10 DT note. Echebbi was considered by later Egyptian literary critic Shawqi Daif to be among the very finest Arabic poets of the modern era.

Echebbi was buried in his hometown of Tozeur, Tunisia. His mausoleum is open to visitors.

His son Jelal died on 30 March 2025.

== Legacy ==
In late 2010 and 2011, Echebbi's poems became a source of inspiration for Arab protestors during the revolutions of the Arab Spring, which began with the Jasmine revolution in Tunisia. The poem Ela Toghat Al Alaam became a popular slogan in 2011 during the Tunisian revolution and later the Egyptian revolution. Since then, there has been a revived interest in his work and his biography.

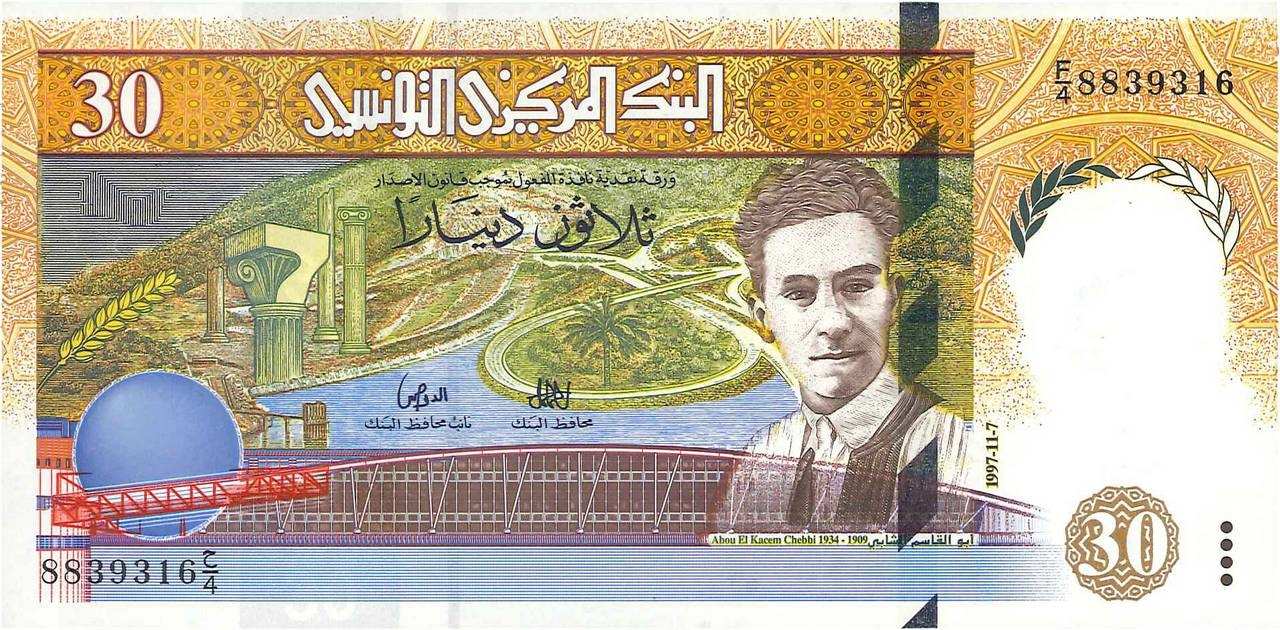
The obverse of the Tunisian 30 dinar the image of Aboul-Qacem Echebbi since 1997.

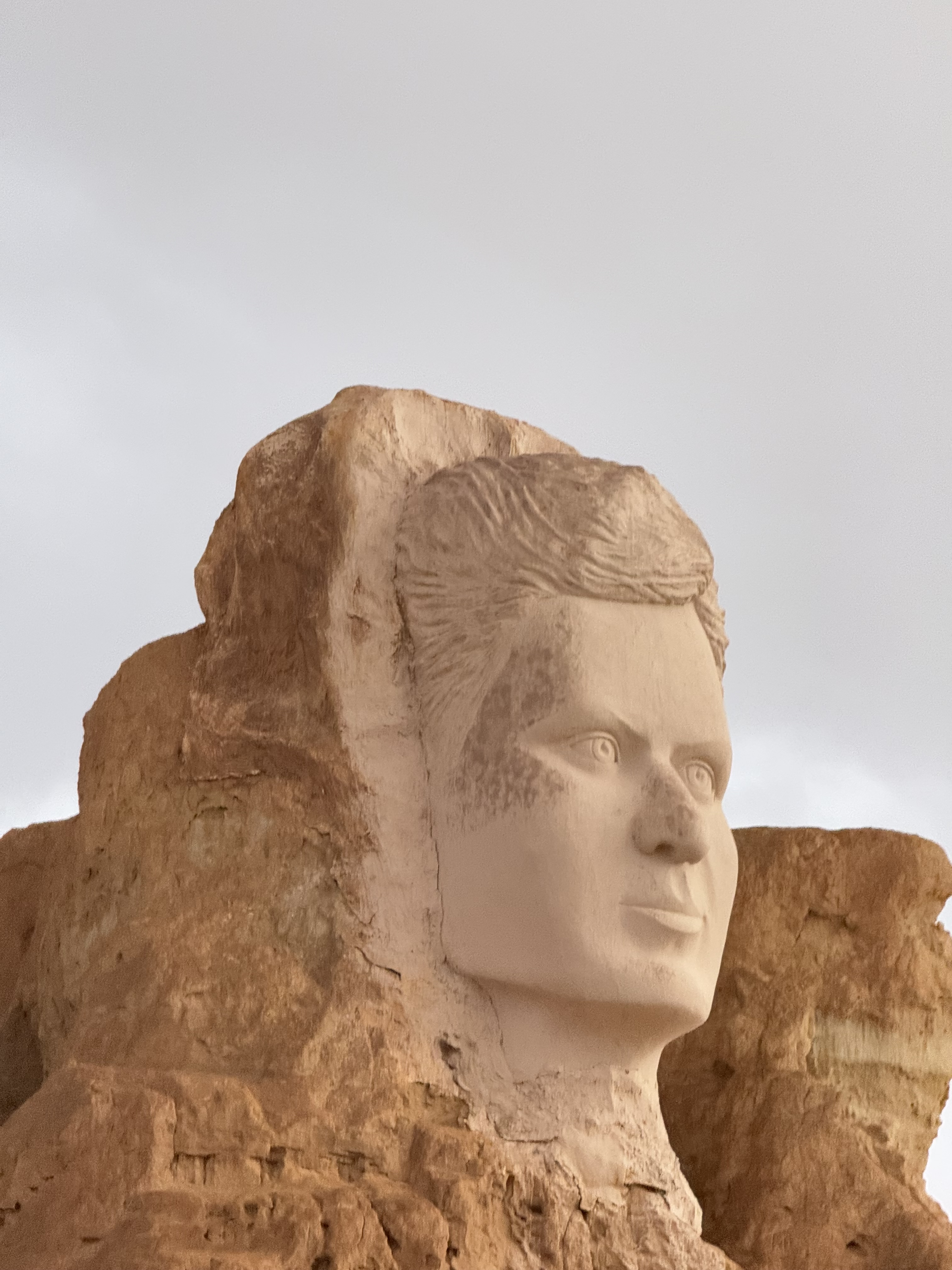
Sculpture of Aboul-Qacem Echebbi in a public park in his hometown in Tozeur

== Works ==
- Ilā Ṭuġāt al-Ɛālam (To the tyrants of the world)
- Aġānī al-Ḥayāt (canticles of the life)
- Muđakkarāt (Memories)
- Rasā'il (A collection of letters)
- Ṣadīqī (A collection of seminars given to the Alumni Association of the college; caused quite a lot of controversy among conservative literary groups)

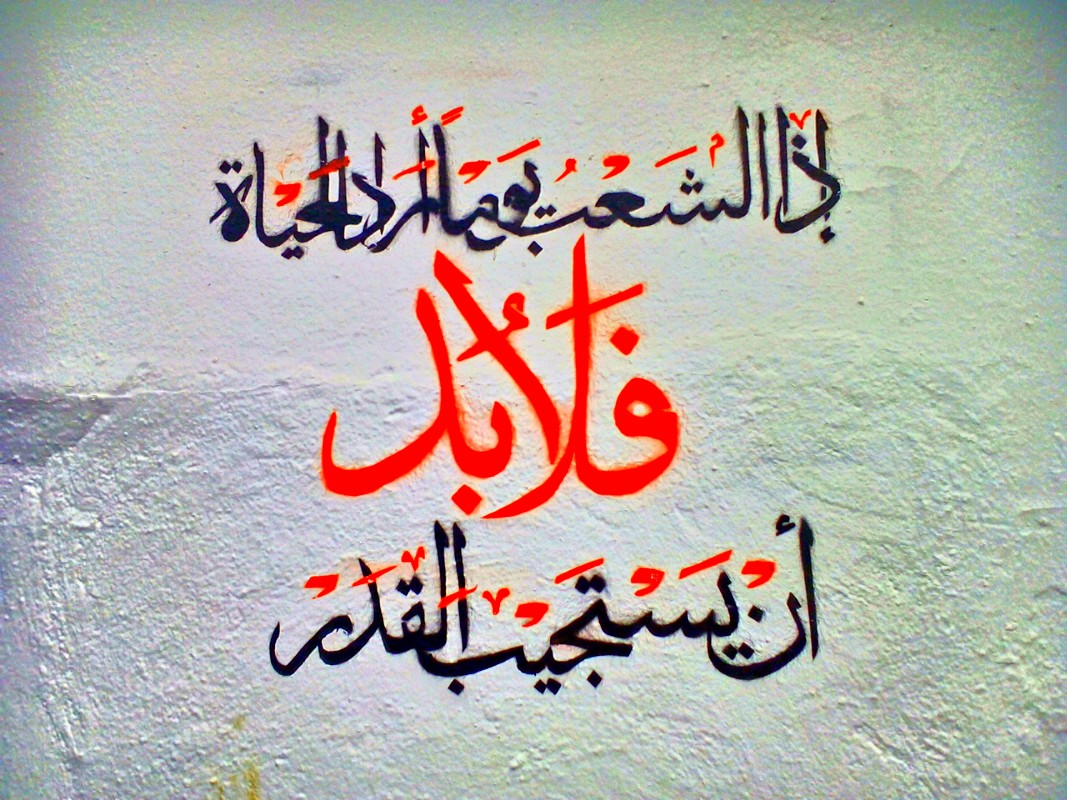
This a verse from the poem (ārādahu alḥayyāhu) was written by the Tunisian poet Aboul-Qacem Echebbi on 16 September 1933, and is considered one of the most famous poems in modern Arabic poetry.

== See also ==
- Al-Tijani Yusuf Bashir, a Sudanese contemporary of Echebbi who also died at the age of 25
- Al Nahda (Arab cultural and literary renaissance)
