= Balqa =

Balqa may refer to the following places:

- Balqa (region), the central highland region of Jordan where Amman is situated.
- Balqa Governorate, one of the governorates of Jordan, covering part of the Balqa region around the city of Salt.
- Al-Balqaʼ Applied University, a university in Salt.
