= Salam al-Bey =

National anthem of the Beylik of Tunis and Kingdom of Tunisia

Salām al-Bāy
English: "Beylical Hymn"
- سلام الباي
- Former national anthem of Tunisia
- Music: Giuseppe Verdi
- Adopted: 1846
- Relinquished: 25 July 1957
- Succeeded by: "Humat al-Hima"

"Salām al-Bāy" (Arabic: سلام الباي; "Beylical Hymn") was the national anthem of Tunisia between 1846 and 1957 during the Beylik of Tunis and the Kingdom of Tunisia. It was sung in honour of the Bey of Tunis, who reigned over the country.

Initially without words, Arab words were written by an unknown poet and French words adapted to the melody of the hymn. According to historian Othman Kaak (quoted by Salah El Mahdi), the music was composed by Giuseppe Verdi, but Salah El Mahdi himself disputes this information.

The hymn was temporarily replaced as the national anthem by the "Ala Khallidi" after the end of the monarchy and the proclamation of the republic on 25 July 1957.

== Lyrics ==
Arabic lyrics

بدوام هذا النّصر
وعزّ هذا العصر
يعيش الباي طول
السّنين والدّهر

ادّه يا ربّ كمال
مع جلال و إقبال
وأدِم هذا المشير
مظهرا لكلّ فخر

French translation

Salut au Prince Valeureux
Ô tout puissant, Ô généreux
Que l'amour du bien anime
Le Bey Magnanime

Sous les lois du progrès
Son peuple s'est courbé
Pour lui rendre Justice
Que ce chant retentisse

Gloire, Gloire et Salut au Bey

English translation

Salute to the Valiant Prince
O Almighty, O Generous
May the love of good animate
The Magnanimous Bey

Under the laws of progress
His people bowed down
To do him justice
Let this song resound

Glory, Glory and Salute to the Bey
