= Rasamna Ala Al-Qalb Wajh Al-Watan =

Rasamna A'la Al-Qlb Wagh Al-Watan
English: We engraved, on hearts, the sights of homeland
- رسمنا على القلب وجة الوطن
- Flag of Egyptian Armed Forces
- National anthem of Egyptian Armed Forces
- Lyrics: Farouk Gouida
- Music: Kamal Al Taweel

Rasamna A'la Al-Qlb Wagh Al-Watan ("We painted, on the heart, homeland's face" or "We engraved, on hearts, the sights of homeland"; Arabic: رسمنا على القلب وجة الوطن) is the anthem of the Egyptian Armed Forces. The Lyrics were written by Farouk Gouida and composed by Kamal Al-Taweel.

== Lyrics ==
Arabic lyrics	Transliteration	Translation
رسمنا على القلب وجه الوطن نخيلا ونيلا وشعبا أصيلا	Rasmna 'alal-qalbe wajha-l-watan, Nakheelan wa neelan wa sha'ban aseela	On hearts we engraved the sights of homeland, its palms, Nile and noble people
وصناك يا مصر طول الزمن ليبقى شبابك جيلا فجيلا	Wa sonnaki ya Misro toola-zzaman, Le-yabqa shababoke jeelan fa-jeela	We protected you, O Egypt, over the time, So your youthfulness remains for ever
على كل أرض تركنا علامة قلاعا من النور تحمى الكرامة	'Ala kolle arden tarakna 'alaama, Qelaa'an mena-nnoore tahmi-l-karama	Over every land we left a mark, Castles of light, protects our dignity
عروبتنا تفتديك القلوب ويحميك بالدم جيش الكنانة	'Oroobatona taftadeeki-l-qoloob, Wa yahmeeki be-ddamme jaisho-l-kenana	Our Arabic identity will make us sacrifice our hearts for you, And by blood, the army of Kenana [Egypt, the cradle] will protect you
وتنساب يا نيل حرا طليقا لتحكى ضفافك معنى النضال	Wa tansaabo ya neelo horran taleeqan, Le-tahki defafoka ma'na-nnedaala	O Nile, you run free with no stop, So your banks tell the meaning of strife
وتبقى مدى الدهر حصنا عريقا بصدق القلوب وعزم الرجال	Wa tabqa mada-ddahre hesnan 'areekan, Be-sedqe-l-qoloobe wa 'azme-rrejaal	And you shall remain an inveterate fortress, by the honesty of [our] hearts and the determination of [our] men
رسمنا على القلب وجه الوطن نخيلا ونيلا وشعبا أصيلا	Rasmna 'alal-qalbe wajha-l-watan, Nakheelan wa neelan wa sha'ban aseela	On hearts we engraved the sights of homeland, Its palms, Nile and noble people
وصناك يا مصر طول الزمن ليبقى شبابك جيلا فجيلا	Wa sonnaki ya Misro toola-zzaman, Le-yabqa shababoke jeelan fa-jeela	We protected you, O Egypt, over the time, So your youthfulness remains for ever
يد الله يا مصر ترعى سماك وفى ساحة الحق يعلو نداك	Yado-llaahe ya Misro tar'aa samake, Wa fee saahate-l-haqqe ya'loo nedaake	The hand of God, O Egypt, is guarding your sky, and in the field of right, your call is arising
ومادام جيشك يحمى حماك ستمضى إلى النصر دوما خطاك	Wa madama jaishoke yahmi hemake, Satamdi ela-nnasro dawman khotaake	As long as your army is protecting your land, your steps shall always go toward victory
سلام عليك إذا ما دعانا رسول الجهاد ليوم الفداء	Salaamon 'alaike etha ma da'aana, Rasoolo-l-jihaade le-yawme-l-fedaa'	Peace on you when our calling is arose, by the messenger of jihad, to the day of sacrifice
وسالت مع النيل يوما دمانا لنبنى لمصر العلا والرخاء	Wa saalat ma'a-nneele yawman demaana, Le-nabni le-misra-l-'olaa wa-rrakhaa'	The day on which our blood will run with Nile, so we build for Egypt highness and welfare
رسمنا على القلب وجه الوطن نخيلا ونيلا وشعبا أصيلا	Rasmna 'alal-qalbe wajha-l-watan, Nakheelan wa neelan wa sha'ban aseela	On hearts we engraved the sights of homeland, Its palms, Nile and noble people
وصناك يا مصر طول الزمن ليبقى شبابك جيلا فجيلا	Wa sonnaki ya Misro toola-zzaman, Le-yabqa shababoke jeelan fa-jeela	We protected you, O Egypt, over the time, So your youthfulness remains for a ever

== See also ==
- Egyptian National Anthem
- Eslami ya Misr
