= Humat al-Hima =

National anthem of Tunisia

Ḥumāt al-Ḥimā
English: Defenders of the Homeland
- حماة الحمى
- "Ḥumāt al-Ḥimā" played by the Tunisian Symphony Orchestra and the military staff of the Ministry of National Defense, and performed by artists Lotfi Bouchnak, Saber Rebai and Amina Fakhet.
- National anthem of Tunisia
- Lyrics: Mostafa Saadeq Al-Rafe'ie / Aboul-Qacem Echebbi
- Music: Mohammed Abdel Wahab (or possibly Ahmed Kheireddine)
- Adopted: 25 July 1957
- Readopted: 12 November 1987
- Relinquished: 20 March 1958
- Preceded by: "Ala Khallidi" (1987)

Audio sample
- U.S. Navy Band instrumental version (chorus and third verse) in A-flat major: file; help

"Defenders of the Homeland" (Arabic: حماة الحمى, romanized: Ḥumāt al-Ḥimā, pronounced [ħʊˈmæːt æl‿ħɪˈmæː]) is the national anthem of Tunisia, written by Mostafa Saadeq Al-Rafe'ie and Aboul-Qacem Echebbi.

== History ==
The lyrics come from a poem written in the 1930s by Egyptian poet Mostafa Saadeq Al-Rafe'ie. Although some say the melody of this march was composed by Mohammed Abdel Wahab, Tunisian musicologist Salah El Mahdi claims the melody was composed by the poet Ahmed Kheireddine while the original music for the poem was composed by Zakariyya Ahmad.

The very last verses of the lyrics were written by Aboul-Qacem Echebbi. According to El Mahdi, these verses were appended to the lyrics in June 1955 by nationalist Mongi Slim.

Known as the "Hymn of the Revolution", it was sung during the meetings of the ruling party, the Neo Destour, which later changed its name to the Socialist Destourian Party. "Defenders of the Homeland" was temporarily used as a national anthem between the end of the monarchy on 25 July 1957, when it replaced the "Salam al-Bey", and 20 March 1958, when it was replaced by "Ala Khallidi". "Ḥumāt al-Ḥimā" was later brought back again following the coup d'état that brought Zine El Abidine Ben Ali to power on 7 November 1987.

== Lyrics ==
On occasions requiring brevity, a short version is sung consisting of the chorus, the third verse (not repeated) and the chorus again.

Arabic original

كورال:
حُمَاةَ الْحِمَى يَا حُمَاةَ الْحِمَى
هَلُمُّواْ هَلُمُّواْ لِمَجْدِ الزَّمَنْ
لَقَدْ صَرَخَتْ فِي عُرُوقِنَا الدِّمَا
نَمُوتُ نَمُوتُ وَيَحْيَا الْوَطَنْ

١
لِتَدْوِ السَّمَاوَاتُ بِرَعْدِهَا
لِتَرْمِ الصَّوَاعِقُ نِيرَانَهَا
إِلَى عِزِّ تُونِسْ إِلَى مَجْدِهَا
رِجَالَ الْبِلَادِ وَشُبَّانَهَا
فَلَا عَاشَ فِي تُونِسْ مَنْ خَانَهَا
وَلَا عَاشَ مَنْ لَيْسَ مِنْ جُنْدِهَا
نَمُوتُ وَنَحْيَا عَلَى عَهْدِهَا
حَيَاةَ الْكِرَامِ وَمَوْتَ الْعِظَامْ

كورال

٢
وَرِثْنَا السَّوَاعِدَ بَيْنَ الْأُمَمْ
صُخُورًا صُخُورًا كَهَذَا الْبِنَاء
سَوَاعِدُ يَهْتَزُّ فَوْقَهَا الْعَلَمْ
نُبَاهِي بِهِ وَيُبَاهِي بِنَا
وَفِيهَا كَفَا لِلْعُلَى وَالْهِمَمْ
وَفِيهَا ضَمَانٌ لِنَيْلِ الْمُنَى
وَفِيهَا لِأَعْدَاءِ تُونِسْ نِقَمْ
وَفِيهَا لِمَنْ سَالَمُونَا السَّلَامْ

كورال

٣
𝄇 إِذَا الشَّعْبُ يَوْمًا أَرَادَ الْحَيَاة
فَلَا بُدَّ أَنْ يَسْتَجِيبَ الْقَدَرْ
وَلَا بُدَّ لِلَّيْلِ أَنْ يَنْجَلِي
وَلَا بُدَّ لِلْقَيْدِ أَنْ يَنْكَسِرْ 𝄆

كورال

Romanization of Arabic

Kūrāl:
Ḥumāt al-ḥimā yā ḥumāt al-ḥimā
Halummū halummū li-majdi z-zaman
Laqad ṣaraxat fī ʿurūqinā ad-dimā
Namūtu namūtu wa-yaḥyā l-waṭan

I
Li-tadwi s-samāwātu bi-raʿdihā
Li-tarmi ṣ-ṣawāʿiqu nīrānahā
ʾIlā ʿizzi Tūnis ʾilā majdihā
Rijāl al-bilādi wa-šubbānahā
Fa-lā ʿāša fī Tūnis man xānahā
Wa-lā ʿāša man laysa min jundihā
Namūtu wa-naḥyā ʿalā ʿahdihā
Ḥayāt al-kirāmi wa-mawt al-ʿiẓām

Kūrāl

II
Wa-riṯnā as-sawāʿida bayn al-ʾumam
Ṣuxūran ṣuxūran ka-haḏā l-bināʾ
Sawāʿidu yahtazzu fawqahā l-ʿalam
Nubāhī bihi wa-yubāhī binā
Wa-fīhā kafā li-l-ʿulā wa-l-himam
Wa-fīhā ḍamānun li-nayli il-munā
Wa-fīhā li-ʾaʿdāʾi Tūnis niqam
Wa-fīhā li-man sālamūnā as-salām

Kūrāl

III
𝄆 ʾIḏā š-šaʿbu yawman ʾarāda al-ḥayāh
Fa-lā budda ʾan yastajīb al-qadar
Wa-lā budda li-l-layli ʾan yanjalī
Wa-lā budda li-l-qaydi ʾan yankasir 𝄇

Kūrāl

IPA transcription (Note: See Help:IPA/Arabic and Tunisian Arabic.)

[kuː.rɑːl]
[ħʊ.mæːt æl.ħɪ.mæː jæ ħʊ.mæːt æl.ħɪ.mæː]
[hæ.lʊm.mʊː hæ.lʊm.mʊː li.mæʒ.dɪ‿z.zæ.mæn]
[lɑ.qɑd sˤɑ.rɑ.χɑt fɪː ʕʊ.rʊː.qɪ.næː‿d.di.mæː]
[næ.muː.tu næ.muː.tu wæ.jɑħ.jæ‿l.wɑ.tˤɑn]

1
[lɪ.tæd.wɪ‿s.sæ.mæː.wæː.tʊ bi.rɑʕ.di.hæ]
[lɪ.tɑr.mɪ‿sˤ.sˤɑ.wɑː.ʕɪ.qʊ niː.rɑː.næ.hæː]
[ʔi.læ ʕɪz.zɪ tuː.nɪs ʔi.læ mæʒ.di.hæː]
[rɪ.ʒæːl æl.bɪ.læː.di wæ.ʃʊb.bæː.næ.hæː]
[fæ.læː ʕɑ.ʃæ fiː tuː.nɪs mæn χɑ.næ.hæː]
[wæ.læː ʕɑ.ʃæ mæn læj.sæ mɪn ʒʊn.di.hæː]
[næ.muː.tu wæ.nɑħ.jæː ʕɑ.læ ʕɑh.di.hæː]
[ħɑ.jæːt æl.ki.rɑː.mi wɑ.mɑwt æl.ʕɪ.ðˤɑm]

[kuː.rɑːl]

2
[wɑ.rɪθ.næː‿s.sæ.wɑː.ʕɪ.dæ bæjn æl.ʔu.mæm]
[sˤʊ.χuː.rɑn sˤʊ.χuː.rɑn kæ.hæ.ðæː‿l.bi.næː]
[sæ.wæː.ʕɪ.dʊ jæh.tæz.zʊ fɑw.qɑ.hæː‿l.ʕɑ.læm]
[nu.bæː.hiː bi.hiː wæ.jʊ.bæː.hiː bi.næː]
[wæ.fiː.hæː kæ.fæː lɪl.ʕʊ.læ wæ‿l.hɪ.mæm]
[wæ.fiː.hɑː dˤɑ.mæː.nʊn li.næj.lɪ‿l.mu.næ]
[wæ.fiː.hæː li.ʔɑʕ.dæː.ʔi tuː.nɪs nɪ.qɑm]
[wæ.fiː.hæː li.mæn sæː.læ.muː.næː‿s.sæ.læːm]

[kuː.rɑːl]

3
𝄆 [ʔi.ðæː‿ʃ.ʃɑʕ.bʊ jɑw.mæn ʔɑ.rɑː.dæ‿l.ħɑ.jæːh]
[fæ.læː bʊd.dæ ʔæn jæs.tæ.ʒiːb æl.qɑ.dɑr]
[wæ.læː bʊd.dæ lɪl.læj.li ʔæn jæn.ʒæ.liː]
[wæ.læː bʊd.dæ lɪl.qɑj.di ʔæn jæn.kæ.sɪr] 𝄇

[kuː.rɑːl]

English translation

Chorus:
O defenders of the Homeland!
Rally around to the glory of our time!
The blood surges in our veins,
We die for the sake of our land.

I
Let the heavens roar with thunder
Let thunderbolts rain with fire.
Men and youth of Tunisia,
Rise up for her might and glory.
No place for betrayers in Tunisia,
Only for those who defend her!
We live and die loyal to Tunisia,
A life of dignity and a death of glory.

Chorus

II
As a nation we inherited
Arms like granite towers.
Holding aloft our proud flag flying,
We boast of it, it boasts of us,
Arms that achieve ambitions and glory,
Sure to realize our hopes,
Inflict defeat on foes,
Offer peace to friends.

Chorus

III
𝄆 When the people will to live,
Destiny must surely respond.
Oppression shall then vanish.
Fetters are certain to break. 𝄇

Chorus
