= Ahmad Amin =

Egyptian historian and writer

- أحمد أمين
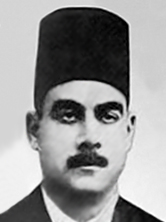
- Born: 1 October 1886; Cairo, Egypt
- Died: 30 May 1954 (aged 67)
- Occupations: Writer, historian

Ahmad Amin (Arabic: أحمد أمين), (1954-1886) was an Egyptian historian and writer. He wrote a series of books on the history of Islamic civilization (1928–1953), a famous autobiography (My Life, 1950), as well as an important dictionary of Egyptian folklore (1953).

== Biography ==
After completing his education at the University of Al-Azhar, he worked as qadi until 1926. He then taught Arabic literature at Cairo University, where he was appointed Dean of the Faculty of Arts, until 1946. Ahmad Amin was one of the most brilliant intellectuals of his time: he was editor of the literary journals Al Risalah (1933) and Al Thaqafa (1939), founder of Ladjnat al-ta'lif wa l-tardjama wa-l-nashr ("Literary Committee of Translation and Publication"). He also contributed to another magazine entitled Al Hilal from 1933 to his death in 1954. He worked as head of the culture department at the Egyptian Ministry of Education before leading the cultural division of the Arab League. He is most famous for his long history of Islamic culture, in three volumes (Fajr al-islam, 1928; Duha l-islam, 1933–1936; Zuhr al-islam, 1945–1953) which is the first attempt of its kind in the modern history of the Muslim world. He also left an autobiography (Hayati, 1950) while his main articles were published under the title Fayd al-khatir.

He lectured on Egyptian literary history between the years of 1939 and 1946. It was during this time that Amin stated his initial belief that Egyptians had not contributed to Arabic poetry during the Middle Ages the way other Arab populations had. Amin's student Shawqi Daif claimed that the dearth of properly published Egyptian works from the period made such a judgement tenuous, and suggested that he and Amin republish the Egyptian sections in anthologies of poetry from the period. Amin agreed to write the introduction while Daif wrote the preface, and fellow scholar Ihsan Abbas assisted the team with editing the folios for printing from 1951 until 1952.

== Bibliography ==
- 1978, My Life. The Autobiography of an Egyptian Scholar, Writer and Cultural Leader, traduction et introduction de Issa Boullata, Leyde, E. J. Brill, 241 p.
- Avril 2011, Autobiographies d'intellectuels égyptiens: Ahmad Amin, Salāma Mūsā, Tawfiq al-Hakim, Subjectivité, identité et vérité, Martine Houssay
