= Fadela Echebbi =

Tunisian poet (born 1946)

Fadhila Echebbi فضيلة الشابي
- Born: 23 January 1946 (age 80); Tozeur, Tunisia
- Occupation: Poet
- Relatives: Aboul-Qacem Echebbi, Lamine Echebbi

Fadhila Echebbi (Arabic: فضيلة الشابي, romanized: Faḏīla aš-Šābbī; born 23 January 1946) is a Tunisian poet. Echebbi was born in Tozeur, Tunisia, on 23 January 1946, the cousin of Tunisian poet Aboul-Qacem Echebbi.

In 1971, she obtained her diploma in Arabic literature, from the Faculty of humanities and social sciences in Tunis.

== Works ==
- Smells of the earth and the anger (1973).
- Roar of the morning (2002).
- Depression of the wind (2003).
