= Al-Balqaʼ Applied University =

University in Jordan

- جامعة البلقاء التطبيقية
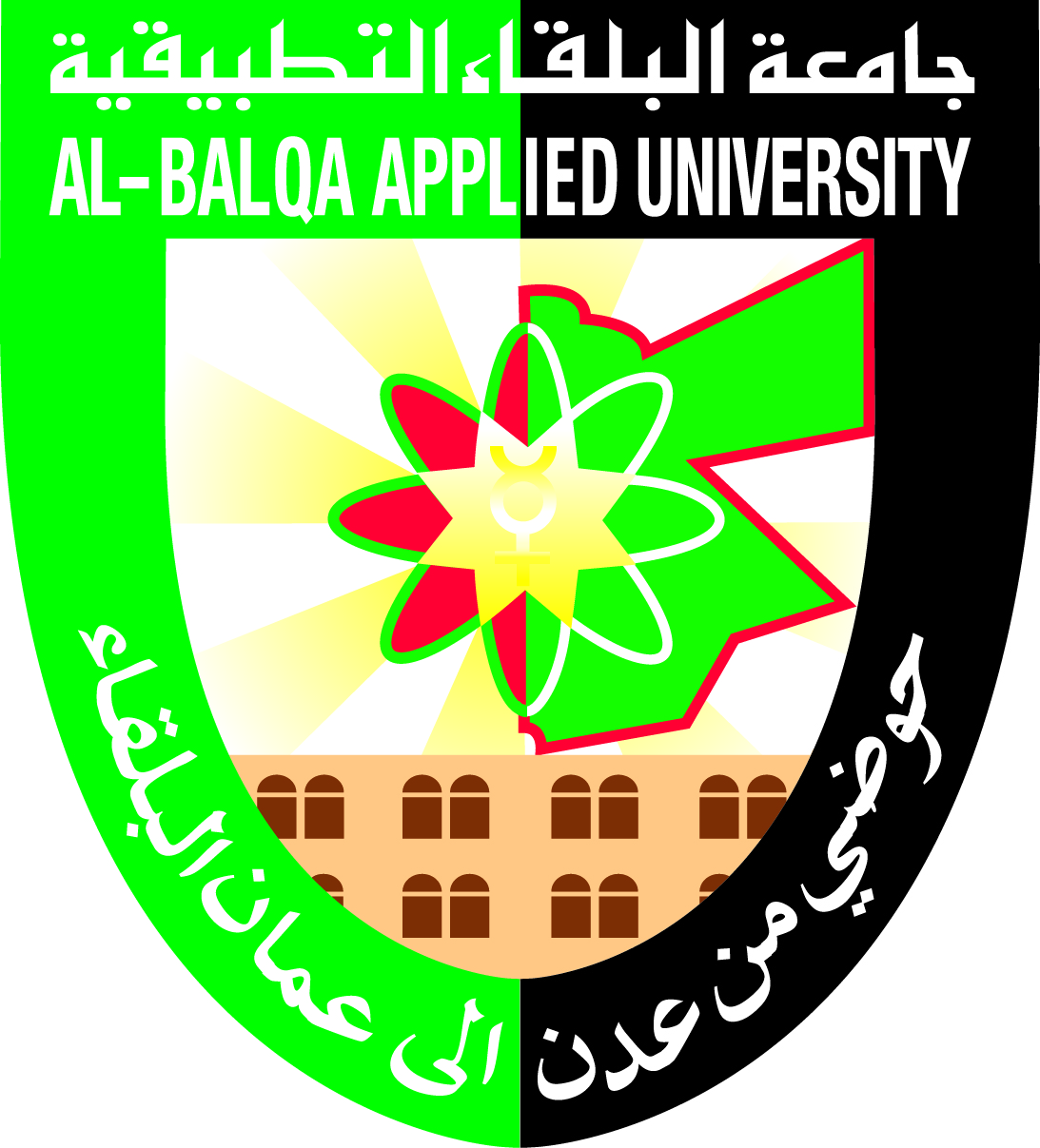
- Other name: BAU
- Type: Public
- Established: 1997
- Affiliations: IAU, FUIW, UNIMED, AArU
- Budget: 2017: 96,996,600 JOD
- Chairman: Jawad Anani
- President: Abdullah Al Zoubi
- Academic staff: 1469
- Students: 43,000; Main Campus: 9677; Other Campuses: 22857
- Undergraduates: 876
- Location: Salt (main campus), Jordan; 32.0240°N 35.7168°E
- Campus: Urban 5,000 acres (20 km^{2})
- Colors: Olive Green and Khaki
- Website: www.bau.edu.jo

Al-Balqaʼ Applied University (BAU) (Arabic جامعة البلقاء التطبيقية) is a government-supported university located in Salt, Jordan, was founded in 1997, a distinctive state university in the field of Bachelor and associate degree Applied Education, at the capacity of more than 21,000 student distributed into 10,000 at the bachelor's degree program and 11,000 at the associate degree program.

Balqa' Applied University was formed by merging several colleges distributed over almost all of the Jordanian provinces. The merger was the result of royal decree, under the auspices of his majesty the late King Hussein to provide qualified professionals who focus on applied technical studies.

BAU was ranked 5th on national level, and achieved an international ranking of 2575 and a regional ranking of 55 according to the Webometrics Ranking of World Universities ranking, as well as a regional ranking of 79 according to US News Education.

== Faculties ==
BAU has 18 branches divided into 6 faculties at the main campus in Al-Salt, and 12 faculties around the kingdom. BAU has a faculty in every Jordanian governorate (Except for Mafraq). In addition to its responsibilities as a hub for higher education, BAU administers a total of 38 public, private and military community colleges across the kingdom.

=== Faculties in main campus in Al-Salt ===
==== Faculty of Medicine ====
- Doctor of Medicine

==== Faculty of Engineering ====
- Architecture
- Civil Engineering
- Computer Engineering
- Computer Systems Engineering
- Electrical Power Engineering
- Mechanical Engineering
- Materials Engineering
- Surveying & Geomatics Engineering

==== Prince Abdullah Bin Ghazi faculty for Information Technology ====
- Computer Science
- Computer Aided Design & Animation
- Software Engineering
- Computer Information Systems

==== Faculty of Applied Science ====
- Mathematics
- Chemistry
- Physics
- Medical Analyses
- Applied Microbiology
- Nutrition and Food Processing

==== Salt College for Humanitarian And Literary Sciences ====
BsC programmes:

- Law
- Nursery Education (females only)
- English Language and Literature
- Library and Information Management
- Applied Arabic Language

Technical diploma programmes:

- Interior Design

Diploma degree:

- Digital Graphic Design

Vocational Diploma programmes:

- Digital Graphic Design
- School Administration
- Education
- Information & Telecommunication Technology in Education

==== Faculty of Planning and Management ====
- Economics
- Planning and Project Management
- Banking and Finances
- Business Management
- Accounting Information Systems
- Management Information Systems
- Marketing
- Accounting

==== Faculty of Technological Agriculture ====
- Biotechnology
- Nutrition and Food Processing
- Bioagricultural Technology / Plant Production and Protection
- Water Resources and Environmental Management

==== Faculty of Graduate Studies ====
The faculty of graduate studies offers the master's degree in the following topics:

- Computer Science
- Nuclear Physics
- Physics of Materials Science
- Management of water resources and the environment
- Applied Chemistry
- Biotechnology
- Mechatronics Engineering
- Business Administration: MIS
- Business Management
- Project Management
- Human Resources Management
- Business Administration: Accounting
- Talent and creativity
- Educational Psychology
- Regional Planning
- Business Administration: E-Business

=== Other faculties around Al-Salt ===
==== Princess Rahma University College ====
Located in the town of Allan, north west of Salt, PRUC offers the following programmes:
BsC:

- Social Work
- Delinquency and Crime
- Special Education

Diploma:

- Social Work
- Special Education

=== Faculties in Northern Jordan ===
==== Al-Huson University College ====
Located in Irbid, it offers the following programmes: BsC:

- Computer Science
- Nutrition & Food Processing
- Chemical Industrial Engineering
- Accounting
- Management of Information Systems
- Water & Environment Engineering
- Vocational Education
- Machinery & Production Engineering
- Air Conditioning & Refrigeration engineering
- Human Resources Management
- Communication & Software Engineering

Master's

- Desalination Engineering

==== Ajloun University College ====
Located in Ajloun, AUC offers the following programmes:

- Computer Science
- English Language and Literature
- Nursery Education (Females only)
- Social Services
- Arabic Language and Literature
- Special Education
- Applied Islamic Studies
- Mathematics
- Delinquency and Crime

==== Irbid University College ====
IUC is a females-only college. It is located in Irbid, IUC offers the following programmes:

- English language & literature
- Applied Arabic Language
- Library & Information Management
- Business Management
- Nursery Education
- Home Economics
- Pottery and Art

=== Faculties in Central Jordan ===
==== Princess Alia University College ====
PAUC is a females-only college. It's located in the Shmeisani neighbourhood in West Amman, it offers the following programmes:

- English language & literature
- Applied Arabic Language
- Library & Information Management
- Business Management
- Nursery Education
- Home Economics
- Business Administration
- Psychological and Educational Guidance
- Special Education

==== Amman University College for Financial & Administrative Sciences ====
Located in Shafa-Badran, Amman. It offers the following programmes:

- Accounting
- Financial and Banking Sciences
- Management of Information Systems
- Business Administration
- Accounting Information Systems
- Electronic marketing
- Financial technology
- Customs sciences

==== Zarqa University College ====
Located in Zarqa, it offers the following programmes:

- Nutrition and Food Processing
- Medical Analyses
- Biology
- Applied Microbiology

==== Faculty of Engineering Technology (FET) ====
Located in Al Zahra neighbourhood in Marka, East Amman. FET is specialized in engineering and technological programmes. It currently offers the following programmes:

- Chemical Industrial Engineering
- Electric Power Engineering
- Highway and Bridge Engineering
- Mechatronics Engineering
- Computer Engineering
- Thermal & Hydraulic Machinery Engineering
- Autotronics Engineering
- Telecommunication Engineering
- General Mechanical Engineering
- Networks Engineering
- Physics

=== Faculties in Southern Jordan ===
==== Aqaba University College ====
Located in Aqaba.

- Hotel Management
- Management of Information Systems
- Accounting
- Computer Science
- Maritime Transport Technology
- Freight Forwarding and Logistics

==== Karak College ====
Located in Kerak.

- Library and Information Management
- Management of Information Systems
- Accounting Information Systems

==== Ma’an College ====
Located in Ma'an.

- Accounting
- Management of Information Systems
- Accounting Information Systems
- Banking and Financial Sciences

==== Shobak College ====
Located in the town of Shoubak, near by Petra.

- Plant Production and Protection
- Vocational Education

=== Former Faculties ===
- Tafilah Applied University College: Became Tafila Technical University in Tafilah in 2005.
- Usul Al-Deen University College: Became World Islamic Sciences and Education University in Tabarbour, northern Amman.

== Affiliated Institutes ==
- The Royal Jordanian Geographic Center College (Amman).

== See also ==
- List of Islamic educational institutions
