= Ala Khallidi =

Former national anthem of Tunisia

ʾAlā Khallidī
- ألا خلّدي
- Former national anthem of Tunisia
- Lyrics: Jalaleddine Naccache
- Music: Salah El Mahdi
- Adopted: 20 March 1958
- Relinquished: 12 November 1987
- Preceded by: "Salām al-Bāy" "Ḥumāt al-Ḥimā" (1958)
- Succeeded by: "Ḥumāt al-Ḥimā"

"ʾAlā Khallidī" (Arabic: ألا خلّدي) was the national anthem of Tunisia from 1958 to 1987. It was used during the presidency of Habib Bourguiba until his downfall in 1987. "Ḥumāt al-Ḥimā" was temporarily a national anthem between the end of the monarchy on 25 July 1957 and the adoption of "ʾAlā Khallidī" as the official national anthem.

== Composition ==
In 1958, the Ministry of Education organized a competition, in which 53 poets and 23 musicians took part. The results were examined first by a commission of the Board of Education, which selected the submissions of the hymn poet Jalaleddine Naccache and the composer and director of the Conservatoire of Tunis Salah El Mahdi. The works were presented to the president without announcing the selection that already been made. He selected the same version as the commission had. To be completely sure, officials held another larger popular assembly in Monastir, the birth city of the president, where all 23 melodies were played. The song by Naccache and El Mahdi won, and the nation formally adopted it on 20 March, Tunisia's Independence Day, that year.

However, the anthem contained a line that made direct reference to President Bourguiba: "Nakhūḍ ul-lahīb bi-rūḥ il-Ḥabīb zaʿīm il-waṭan" (We brave the flames with the spirit of Habib, leader of the homeland). Consequently, "Ḥumāt al-Ḥimā" replaced "ʾAlā Khallidī", following the 1987 Tunisian coup d'état, which brought Zine El Abidine Ben Ali to power on 7 November 1987.

== Lyrics ==
Arabic original	Romanization of Arabic	English translation
:كورال ألا خلّدي يا دمانا الغوالي جهاد الوطن لتحرير خضرائنا لا نبالي بأقسى المحن جهاد تحلّى بنصر مبين على الغاصبين على الظالمين طغاة الزمن نخوض اللهيب بروح الحبيب زعيم الوطن أرى الحكم للشعب فابنوا لنا من المجد أعلى صروح تشاد أجيبوا أجيبوا لأوطاننا نداء اﻷخوة والاتحاد وذودوا العدى عن حمى أرضنا وكونوا أسودا ليوم الجلاد كورال ورثنا الجلاد ومجد النضال وفي أرضنا مصرع الغاصبين وصالت أساطيلنا في النزال تموج بأبطالنا الفاتحين لواء الكفاح بهذا الشمال رفعناه يوم الفدى باليمين كورال شباب العلى عزّنا بالحمى وعزّ الحمى بالشباب العتيد لنا همّة طالت اﻷنجما تعيد المعالي وتبني الجديد فحيّوا اللّوا خافقا في السّما بعزّ وفخر ونصر مجيد كورال	Kūrāl: ʾAlā Khallidī yā dimānā l-gawālī Jihād al-waṭan Li-taḥrīri khaḍrāʾinā lā nubālī Bi-ʾaqsā l-miḥan Jihādun taḥallā bi-naṣrin mubīn ʿAlā l-gāṣibīn ʿalā ẓ-ẓālimīn Ṭugāt iz-zaman Nakhūḍ ul-lahīb bi-rūḥ il-Ḥabīb Zaʿīm il-waṭan ʾArā l-ḥukma li-sh-shaʿbi fa-abnū lanā Min al-majdi ʾaʿlā ṣurūḥin tushād ʾAjībū ʾajībū li-ʾawṭāninā Nidāʾ al-ʾukhuwwati wa-l-ittiḥād Wa-dhūdū l-ʿidā ʿan ḥimā ʾarḍinā Wa-kūnū ʾusūdan li-yawm il-jilād Kūrāl Wa-rithnā l-jilāda wa-majd an-niḍāl Wa-fī ʾarḍinā maṣraʿ ul-gāṣibīn Wa-ṣālat ʾasāṭīlunā fi-n-nizāl Tamūju bi-ʾabṭālinā l-fātiḥīn Liwāʾ ul-kifāḥi bi-hadhā sh-shamāl Rafaʿnāhu yawm al-fidā bi-l-yamīn Kūrāl Shabāb ul-ʿulā ʿizzunā bi-l-ḥimā Wa-ʿizzu l-ḥimā bi-sh-shabāb il-ʿatīd Lanā himmatun ṭālat il-ʾanjumā Tuʿīd ul-maʿāli wa-tabnī l-jadīd Faḥayyū l-liwā khāfiqan fi-s-samā Bi-ʿizzin wa-fakhrin wa-naṣrin majīd Kūrāl	Chorus: Immortal and precious the blood we have shed for our dear fatherland. In order to free our green land any hardship we gladly will stand. The fight is made sweet by a victory sure, Removing the yoke we've had to endure. The fire we confront as faithful we keep The spirit of our great leader Habib. The people are sov'reign and so let us raise Of glory a citadel for all to see. O answer, O answer our fatherland's call To true brotherhood and to true unity. Be ready, like lions prepared for the fight, Defending our country from each enemy. Chorus The glory and fight we inherit today. Oppressors were fought here on this battleground. Our legions in fury attacked in the field, As heroes in waves let their war-cries resound. The banner of war in the North we have raised, By oath we to ransom our land all are bound. Chorus O noble the youth, our defence you assure, Defending our honour, as ready you be. Our strong aspirations reach up to the sky That greatness return and a new day we see. The flag, as it waves in the sky, now salute With honour and glory and great victory. Chorus
