= Islamī yā Miṣr =

National anthem of Egypt from 1923 until 1936

English: Be safe, O Egypt
- اسلمي يا مصر
- Former national anthem of Egypt
- Lyrics: Mostafa Saadeq Al-Rafe'ie
- Music: Safar Ali
- Adopted: 1923
- Relinquished: 1936
- Preceded by: Salam Affandina
- Succeeded by: Salam Affandina

Audio sample
- file; help

"Be Safe, O Egypt" (Arabic: اسلمي يا مصر, romanized: Islamī yā Miṣr) was the national anthem of Egypt from 1923 to 1936. It was written by the Egyptian poet Mostafa Saadeq Al-Rafe'ie, and the music was composed by Safar Ali. It is adopted currently as the song of the Egyptian Police Academy.

== Lyrics ==
Arabic lyrics

اسلمى يا مصر إننى الفدا
ذى يدى إن مدت الدنيا يدا
أبدا لن تستكينى أبدا
إننى أرجو مع اليوم غدا
ومعى قلبى وعزمى للجهاد
ولقلبى أنت بعد الدين دين

كورال:
لك يا مصر السلامة
وسلاما يا بلادى
إن رمى الدهر سهامه
أتقيها بفؤادى
واسلمى فى كل حين

أنا مصرى بنانى من بنى
هرم الدهر الذى أعيا الفنا
وقفة الأهرام فيما بيننا
لصروف الدهر وقفتى أنا
فى دفاعى وجهادى للبلاد
لا أميل لا أمل لا ألين

كورال

ويك يا من رام تقييد الفلك
أى نجم فى السما يخضع لك
وطن الحر سمًا لا تمتلك
والفتى الحر بأفقه ملك
لا عدا يا أرض مصر فيكِ عاد
أننا دون حماكى أجمعين

كورال

للعلا أبناء مصر للعلا
وبمصر شرفوا المستقبلا
وفدًا لمصرنا الدنيا فلا
نضع الأوطان إلا أولا
جانبى الأيسر قلبه الفؤاد
وبلادى هى لى قلبى اليمين

كورال

Transliteration

Eslami ya Misro ennani-l-fedaa
Thee yadi en maddate-l-donia yada
Abadan lan tastakeeni abada
Ennani argo ma'a-l-yawme ghada
Wa ma'ee qalbi wa 'azmi lel-gehad
Wa le-qalbi ante ba'da-ddeene deen

Kurâl:
Laki ya Misro-ssalaama
Wa salaaman ya belaadi
En rama-ddahro sehaamah
Altaqeeha be-fo'aadi
Wa-slami fee kolle heen

Ana Misreyion banani man bana
Harama-ddahre allathee a'yaa-l-fanaa
Waqfato-l-ahraame feema bainana
Le-soroofe-ddahre waqfati ana
Fee defaa'ee wa gehaadi lel-belaad
La ameelo la amallo la aleen

Kurâl

Waika ya man raama taqyeeda-l-falak
Ayyo najmen fe-ssamaa yakhda'o lak
Watano-l-horre saman la tomtalak
Wal-fata-l-horro be-ofqehe malak
La 'adaa ya arda Misren beki 'aad
Ennana doona hemaaki ajma'aeen

Kurâl

Lel-'olaa abnaa'a Misren lel-'olaa
Wa be-Misren sharrefo-l-mostaqbala
Wa-fedan le-Misrena-ddonia falaa
Nada'o-l-awtaana ella awwala
Gaanebi-l-aisaro qalboho-l-fo'aad
Wa belaadi heya lee qalbi-l-yameen

Kurâl

English translation

Be safe, O Egypt; I will sacrifice
There is my hand for you, if the world raised a hand [to hurt you]
Never you shall yield, never
I am hoping for tomorrow [to be better]
My heart and my determination are with me to fight and sacrifice with
And to my heart, O Egypt, you are a religion, after my religion

Chorus:
Safety for you, O Egypt
And peace, O my homeland
If eternity threw its arrows [at you]
I would shield thee with my heart
And be safe in all times

I am an Egyptian, built by the founders of the
Everlasting pyramid, which defeated doom
Like the pyramids stand, I will stand
Against the difficulties and problems of eternity
In my defense and fight for my country
I do not lean, get bored, or yield

Chorus

Be careful, you who are trying to chain the orbits
Which star in the sky is under your control
The homeland of the free is a sky that cannot be possessed
And the free youngsters are owners by their horizons
There is no enemy on your ground anymore, O Egypt
We are all for your protection

Chorus

To great heights, O sons and daughters of Egypt, to great heights
And honor the future by Egypt
The whole world to us is to sacrifice for our Egypt, because
we put our nation only first
My left side has my heart
And my homeland is the heart of my right side

Chorus

== See also ==
- Egyptian National Anthem
- Rasamna Ala Al-Qalb Wajh Al-Watan
