= Arabic Language International Council =

The Arabic Language International Council is an intergovernmental linguistic organization among Arabic-speaking countries. It was founded by the Association of Arab Universities on 16 May 2007 in accordance with the United Nations General Assembly's proclamation of the International Year of Languages in 2008.

The organization was formed within the framework of the UN's effort to promote unity in diversity, and also in recognition of the UN's push for multilingualism as a means of promoting, protecting and preserving the diversity of languages and cultures globally, particularly in the paramount importance attributed to the quality of the organization's six official languages (Arabic, Chinese, English, French, Russian, and Spanish).

The founding of Arabic Language International Council was participated in by more than 160 university rectors and presidents in a series of 41 conferences which took place in Riyadh in 14–16 April 2008.

At the same time, the council is supported and encouraged by the ministers of education in most of the Arab countries, as well as the secretaries general of the Arab League, Organisation of the Islamic Conference, Muslim World League, the Arab Gulf States Cooperation Council, the Arab Maghreb Union, and the Arab Economic Unity Council. This is in addition to the support and approval of the general directors of UNESCO, ISESCO, ALECSO, and the Arab Bureau of Education for the Gulf States. Also, strong support came from universities' rectors, presidents and the secretaries general of the Arab colleges' associations in Arab universities, including colleges and institutes of education, colleges of science, colleges of law, colleges of pharmacy, colleges of engineering, colleges of computing and information, colleges of art, colleges of medicine, colleges of dentists medicine, colleges of science and information technology, colleges of administration sciences.

== Initiatives ==
Since its founding, the council has been very active in promoting the Arabic language. Together with UNESCO, it holds the annual International Conference for the Arabic Language, which draws experts, academics, students, policymakers, and bureaucrats. On its second year, which focused on the discussion of the survival of the Arabic language, the forum already drew thousands of participants as well as high level regional and international sponsorship. This event also serves as an opportunity to forge partnerships such as the case of a memorandum of agreement signed by the council and the ISESCO, which outlined specific measures to effectively teach the Arabic language and highlight its role in preserving Islamic identity.

== See also ==
- Arabic
- Modern Standard Arabic
- Arab League
- Arab world
- List of countries where Arabic is an official language
