= Al Thaqafa =

Egyptian literary magazine (1939–1953)

- Editor: Ahmad Amin
- Categories: Cultural magazine; Literary magazine
- Frequency: Monthly
- Founder: Ahmad Amin
- Founded: 1939
- Final issue: 1953
- Country: Egypt
- Based in: Cairo
- Language: Arabic

Al Thaqafa (Arabic: Culture) was a monthly cultural and literary magazine which was in circulation between 1939 and 1953 in Cairo, Egypt. The magazine was founded by Ahmad Amin who also edited it during its lifetime.

== History and profile ==
Al Thaqafa was launched in 1939 and published monthly until 1953. It was printed on an A4-size paper and was consisted of 65 pages. The founder and sole editor of the magazine was Ahmad Amin. Al Thaqafa was among the publications which supported Islamic Arab culture in Egypt. It published literary work, cultural articles, translations from Turkish, Persian, English, French and Indian and book reviews.

In the 1940s one of the contributors was Mohammad Abd Al Bari who published articles on the political dimensions of culture.
