= Salah El Mahdi =

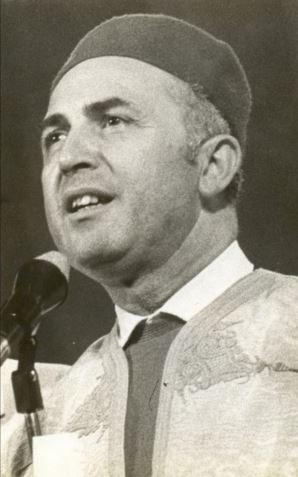
Mr Salah El Mahd

Salah El Mahdi (Tunisian Arabic: صالح المهدي; born Mohamed Ibn Abderrahmane Ben Salah Mehdi Chérifi on February 9, 1925, in Tunis and died September 12, 2014, in Tunis) was a Tunisian musicologist, conductor, composer, flautist, music critic and judge.

== Biography ==
Born in Tunis in 1925, he graduated from University of Ez-Zitouna in 1941 and then at the law school and National School of Administration. He obtained a Ph.D. in musicology in 1981 and a doctorate in letters at the University of Poitiers.

At the age of 18 he left the capital of Tunis to La Marsa and gave music lessons to students. In 1949, he became director of the institution and ensemble there and was appointed honorary member of the SACEM. He was appointed as a judge on November 11, 1951, while assuming the job of music critic in several newspapers. In theater, he performed several roles with the troupe El Kaoukab of Tunis, and wrote plays for radio.

In 1961, he was appointed to the Secretariat of State for Culture and information. He helped establish the National Folk Arts Troupe (1962), the Tunisian Symphony Orchestra (1969), the National Society of Preservation of the Quran and the National School of Chanting the Koran. In 1982, he became general manager of the national cultural activities until his retirement and served as director of the Tunisian Conservatory for many years. Indeed by 1987 he was said to be "director of all of the country's musical organizations."

Internationally, he participated in several conferences run by institutions under UNESCO. Later he became a member of the executive committee of the Islamic history, culture and the arts and the High Committee of Islamic civilization which are headquartered in Istanbul (Turkey) and Executive Committee of the International Council music attached to UNESCO. He is also vice-chairman of the board of the International Society of Music Education, International Institute of Music, and International Folk Music Council.

He has composed nearly 600 compositions, blending classical and folk songs, east and western instrumental music, chamber music and piano pieces, violins and harps and four symphonies. He participated in 1958 to successfully contest the Tunisian national anthem to which he composed the music.

After retirement he pursued teaching and sharing of his knowledge.

== Tribute ==
In recognition of his dedication to Tunisian music and his contributions to the arts, the National Conservatory of Music of Tunis was named after him starting from May 30, 2017.
