= Farouk Gouida =

Egyptian poet

Farouk Gouida (born 10 February 1946) is an Egyptian poet. Gouida's newspaper columns - criticising the privatization of state assets by politicians such as Atef Ebeid and Ahmed Nazif - were collected in Raping a Country (2010). Writing in May 2011, Gouida characterized Hosni Mubarak's regime as guilty of "three crimes": floating the Egyptian pound in 2003; misusing public banks to grant easy loans to favoured businessmen; and indiscriminate privatization.

In March 2012, he was announced as one of the members of the Constituent Assembly of Egypt. He criticised the composition of the assembly, suggesting that 15 assembly members be replaced with constitutional law professors and legal experts. and resigned from it in protest of the complementary constitutional declaration (November 2012). In August he was reported by Al-Ahram as having turned down an offer from President Morsi to be culture secretary.

== Works ==
- Raping a Country: Crimes of Land Pillaging in Egypt, 2010
