= Abdul Rahman Ahmed Jibril Baroud =

Palestinian poet

Abdulrahman Ahmed Jibril Baroud (Arabic: عبد الرحمن بارود; 1937 in Bayt Daras, Mandatory Palestine – 17 April 2010) was a Palestinian poet.

== Biography ==
In 1948, when there was abandonment of his village, he and his family settled in Jabalia refugee camp. The first poem wrote by Baroud was written while he was in primary school. He studied in his village until the fifth grade primary, and completed high school, moving between schools and refugee agencies in the Gaza Strip. He was sent for further study to complete his university studies in the Faculty of Arts at Cairo University. He received a bachelor's degree, and then won a scholarship from the University of Cairo to get his masters and doctorate degrees. Afterwards, he moved to work at King Abdulaziz University in Jeddah as a professor. He wrote most of his poems while working for the university. He was killed in April 2010.

== Most famous works ==
- هجوم السلام
