= Shawqi Daif =

Egyptian literary critic and historian (1910–2005)

Ahmad Shawqi Daif أحمد شوقي ضيف
- Born: January 13, 1910; Um Hamam, Egypt
- Died: March 10, 2005 (aged 95)
- Awards: King Faisal International Prize (1983)

Academic background
- Education: Fuad al-Awal University
- Influences: Ibn Maḍāʾ, Ahmad Amin

Academic work
- Main interests: Arabic language, Arabic literature

Ahmad Shawqi Daif (Arabic: أحمد شوقي ضيف; January 13, 1910 – March 10, 2005) was an Egyptian Arabic literary critic and historian. He is considered one of the most influential Arab intellectuals in the 20th century.

Daif was born in the village of Um Hamam in northern Egypt in 1910. He earned his BA and PhD from Fuad al-Awal University, which would later be known as Cairo University. He was later a professor of Arabic literature at his alma mater for several decades. He was a member of the Egyptian Academy of Sciences and was president of the Academy of the Arabic Language in Cairo for a few years.

== Work ==
Daif studied Egyptian literary history under Ahmad Amin during the latter's 1939–1946 tenure. Amin stated his initial belief that Egyptians had not contributed to Arabic poetry during the Middle Ages the way other Arab populations had. Daif replied that the dearth of properly published Egyptian works from the period made such a judgement tenuous and suggested that he and Amin republish the Egyptian sections in anthologies of poetry from the period. Amin readily agreed, and they embarked on the long term project during which Daif wrote the preface and Amin wrote the introduction. Fellow scholar Ihsan Abbas assisted with editing the folios for republishing from 1951 to 1952.

Daif would later author more than 50 works in arts and literature. His study of the development of Arabic poetry during the Umayyad Caliphate is still considered to be the most important reference book on the topic. His great work was his 100-volume History of Arabic Literature, a project that took 30 years to complete, and was an overview of all poetry, literary criticism and rhetorical studies from Pre-Islamic Arabia up to the post-Abbasid era. The work is considered indispensable for students of Arabic literature, and some volumes have been reprinted up to 20 times.

Daif caused minor shockwaves during the mid-20th century when he rediscovered the ancient linguistic tract of Ibn Maḍāʾ known as Refutation of the Grammarians. Daif agreed with the central theme of the Refutation: linguistic governance and analogy had rendered Arabic language education needlessly difficult and convoluted, and both took the theme as a rallying point for his calls to modernize language arts education in the Middle East.

== Legacy ==
Daif was widely respected throughout the Arab world, having earned the King Faisal International Prize for literature in 1983 as well as the Egyptian Presidential Prize for Literature in 2003. During his career, he was also awarded two state prizes in Egypt and the Academy of the Arabic Language Prize.

Daif had many admirers and critics. Levantine writer and diplomat Shakib Arslan considered himself a defender of Daif against traditionalist criticisms, referring to himself as "the executioner of Shawqi's enemies."
