= El-Said Badawi =

Scholar, linguist and author

- السعيد محمد بدوي
- Born: 1929; El-Nakhas, Zagazig, Sharqia Governorate, Kingdom of Egypt
- Died: March 16, 2014 (aged 84); Cairo, Egypt
- Known for: Categorization of Egyptian Arabic into five distinct levels; Co-authoring A Dictionary of Egyptian Arabic (with Martin Hinds); Founding the Arabic Language Institute at AUC
- Awards: State Merit Prize in Literature (2012)

Academic background
- Education: Dar Al Uloom (BA); SOAS University of London (MA, PhD)

Academic work
- Discipline: Linguistics, Sociolinguistics, Arabic studies

El-Said Muhammad Badawi (Arabic: السعيد محمد بدوي, romanized: Al-Saʿīd Muḥammad Badawī; 1929 – March 16, 2014) was a scholar and linguist and author of many works, both in English and in Arabic, dealing with various aspects of the Arabic language.

Having learned the Qur'an by the age of ten in his village, El-Nakhas, Sharqiyya Governorate, he attended Al-Azhar University for his secondary schooling. He received a B.A. in Arabic Language & Literature and Islamic Studies from Cairo University, an M.A. in General Linguistics and Phonetics from the University of London, and his Ph.D. in Experimental Phonetics from the University of London.

After obtaining his Ph.D. Badawi briefly taught linguistics at the University of Cairo, then began teaching Arabic literature and linguistics at Omdurman University in Sudan, and moved to the American University in Cairo in 1969, where he became the Curriculum Advisor for the Center for Arabic Study Abroad (CASA) in 1970.

Badawi's wide-ranging interests included colloquial Egyptian Arabic, classical Arabic as found in the Qur'an, and the teaching of Arabic as a foreign language. In the field of sociolinguistics, perhaps Badawi's best known work is Mustawayāt al-ʻArabīyah al-muʻāṣirah fī Miṣr (Levels of Contemporary Arabic in Egypt) wherein he challenges the traditional simplistic dichotomy of Classical and Colloquial Arabic, proposing instead a more subtle analysis involving several levels of usage.

== Works ==
=== English ===
- An intonational study of colloquial Riyadhi Arabic. 1965 (Ph.D. thesis)
- A comprehensive study of Egyptian Arabic. 1978 (coauthored with E.T. Abdel-Massih et al.)
- A reference grammar of Egyptian Arabic. 1979 (coauthored with E.T. Abdel-Massih et al.)
- A comprehensive study of Egyptian Arabic 2. Proverbs and metaphoric expressions 1981 (coauthored with E.T. Abdel-Massih et al.)
- A dictionary of Egyptian Arabic : Arabic-English. 1986 (coauthored with M. Hinds)
- Sultan Qaboos encyclopedia of Arab names 2, Treasury of Arab Names, in four volumes. 1991 (coauthored with M. Al-Zubair)
- Modern written Arabic : a comprehensive grammar. 2002
- Arabic-English dictionary of Qur'anic usage. 2007

=== Arabic ===
- Mustawayāt al-ʻArabīyah al-muʻāṣirah fī Miṣr : baḥth fī ʻalāqat al-lughah bi-al-ḥaḍārah. 1973
- Muʻjam asmāʼ al-ʻArab. 1991
- Dalīl aʻlām ʻUmān. 1991
- al-Kitāb al-asāsī fī taʻlīm al-lughah al-ʻArabīyah li-ghayr al-nāṭiqīn bi-hā. 2006
- Buḥūth lughawīyah wa-tarbawīyah fī qaḍāyā al-ʻArabīyah al-muʻāṣirah wa-mushkilātihā. 2015
