= Mostafa Saadeq Al-Rafe'ie =

Egyptian poet (1880–1937)

- مصطفى صادق الرافعى
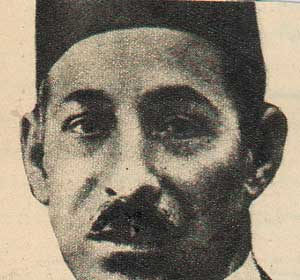
- Born: 1 January 1880; Qalyubiyya, Egypt
- Died: 1 May 1937 (aged 57)
- Occupation: Poet
- Notable work: Eslami ya Misr, "Wahy al-Qalam", "Hadeeth Al Qamar", "Al-Masakin"

Mostafa Saadeq Al-Rafe'ie (Note: Egyptian Arabic pronunciation: [mosˁˈtˁɑfɑ ˈsˁɑːdeʔ erˈrɑfʕi]; in the rural pronunciation more common back then [ˈmʊsˁtˁɑfɑ ˈsˁɑːdɪɡ ɪrˈrɑːfʕi]) (1 January 1880 – May 1937) was a prominent Egyptian poet from Qalyubiyya, Egypt. He is well-known for originally writing the Tunisian national anthem "Defenders of the Homeland" (حماة الحمى).

== Early life ==
Al-Rafe'ie was born into a family of notable lineage, his maternal grandfather, Sheikh Eltoukhy, was originally from Aleppo، modern-day Syria, and used to conduct his business between the Levant and Egypt. Al-Rafe'ie encountered a significant life change when he lost his hearing at the age of thirty.

== Career ==
Notwithstanding his hearing disability, Al-Rafe'ie carved a name for himself in the literary world as a self-taught scholar. He rose to prominence as one of the most revered Arab poets in the early twentieth century. He composed the words of the Egyptian national anthem Eslami ya Misr, which was in use between 1923 and 1936. The words of the Tunisian national anthem are largely the work of Al-Rafe'ie.

Rafi did not last long in the field of poetry, he gave it up and started writing prose because he found more desire for it. Before the phenomenon of his withdrawal from poetry, it becomes clear that he was right in this position; despite the success he achieved in this literary field, and although he was able to attract attention, but in fact he could not surpass the status achieved by the great poets of his time, especially Ahmed Shawqi Hafiz Ibrahim, these two expressed in two poems the feelings and anxieties of thepeople of this generation.

It was perhaps Ar-Rafi who raised the first cry of protest against traditional Arabic poetry in Arabic literature, as he used to say, "Arabic poetry has limitations that prevent it from organizing everything it wants to express through poetry," and these limitations are weight and rhyme.

The first area into which Al-Rafi, constrained by weight and rhyme, moved was that of poetic prose, free to express his archaic emotions that filled his heart and not to go beyond them, to actions beyond moral and religious obligations, as he had envisioned them to be. His quote, "What is the absurdity of life if it does not indicate its honor and value to some living people whom we see in a world of dust, as if their material were Clouds, in which for others there is shadow, water and breeze, but for themselves there is purity, height and beauty".

As for the second field in which Al-Rafi entered, it is the field of literary studies, the most important of which was his book on the history of Arabic literature, which is a very valuable book, and it was probably the first book on this subject to appear in the modern era, because it appeared at the beginning of the twentieth century, namely in 1911.

== Works ==
Some of the author's books and writings:

1- "Wahy al-Qalam" is written by Mostafa Saadeq Al-Rafe'ie "The book is composed of three parts, which are a collection of critical and constructive articles inspired by the contemporary social life and Islamic stories and history."

2- "Hadeeth Al Qamar" by Mostafa Saadeq Al Rafeie was first published in 1912.

3-"Al-Masakin" The Destitute, was first published in 1917.
