= Mahmoud Mohamed Shaker =

Egyptian writer and scholar (1909–1997)

Mahmoud Mohamed Shaker (Note: Arabic: محمود محمد شاكر) (1 February 1909 – 7 August 1997), also known by his kunya Abu Fihr, (Note: أبو فِهر) was an Egyptian writer, poet, journalist and scholar of the Arabic language and Islamic culture heritage.

== Early life ==
Shaker was born on 1 February 1909 in Alexandria, and died on 7 August 1997 in Cairo.

== Career ==
His thoughts and writings were based on the originality of the Arabic culture. He wrote many books on Arabic language and culture including: A Message on The Way of Our Culture (Resala Fel Tarik Ela Thakafatena رسالة في الطريق إلى ثقافتنا), Al-Mutanabi المتنبي, Untruths and Tales (Abateel wa Asmaar أباطيل وأسمار), The Virgin Sagittarius ( Al-Qaws Al-AZraa القوس العذر. Most of his articles, which were published in different journals and magazines, were collected by professor Adel Solaiman Gamal in one book of 2 volumes titled: Jamharat Al-Maqalaat جمهرة المقالات . He was also known for his polemical blog.

== See also ==
- Ahmad Muhammad Shakir
