= Latifa (singer) =

Tunisian singer (born 1961)

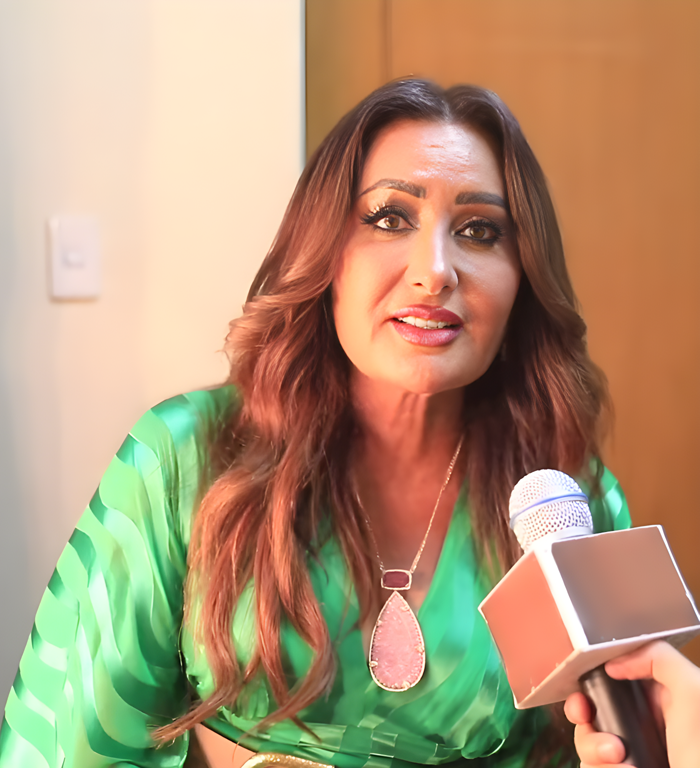
- Latifa gives press statements to the Egyptian newspaper "EL Osboa" (2022).
- Born: Latifa bint Alaya El Arfaoui لطيفة بنت عليه العرفاوي; 14 February 1961 (age 65); Manouba, Tunisia
- Occupations: Singer, actress
- Years active: 1980s–present
- Musical career
- Genres: Egyptian, Arab pop, Classic, Arab Tarab, Arabic music, Arabesque music, Middle Eastern music, Raï
- Labels: La Reine, Universal Music, Warner Bros., EMI, Virgin Records, Alam Al Phan, LATISOL, Rotana

Latifa bint Alaya El Arfaoui (Arabic: لطيفة بنت عليه العرفاوي pronunciation: [ɫɑˈt̪ˤiːfæ bɪnt ʕælɛi̯jæ (e)l.ʕɑrˤˈfɛːwi]; born 14 February 1961), better known as Latifa (Arabic: لطيفة), is a Tunisian pop singer and former actress who resides in Egypt, and one of the most known and best-selling singers in the Arab world and the Middle East. She is known for her Tunisian and Egyptian Arabic genre. She sings in 3 different languages, Arabic, French and English. She received the World Music Awards in 2004 for best selling Artist in the Middle East and she is the first Tunisian receiving this award in history.

== Early life ==
Latifa Bint Alaya El Arfaoui was born in Manouba, Tunisia.

In 1983, shortly after her father died, Latifa and her family took a trip to Egypt to rest and mourn. While there, she met composer Baligh Hamdi, who advised her to move to Egypt to benefit her career. However, Latifa wanted to concentrate on her education and returned to Tunisia to finish her high school final exams. For financial reasons, she was unable to return to Egypt, so she attended college in Tunisia, studying Dutch literature for a year and a half. Her family decided to pay for her to go to Egypt, so she quit college in Tunisia and joined the Arab Academy of Music in Egypt, where she completed her bachelor degree. She is preparing for her master's degree.

While at the Academy, she was discovered by composer Mohammed Abdel Wahab, who had heard her on the radio. At the time she was primarily performing long Tarab songs, but soon began a change of direction working with composer Ammar El Sherei and poet Abdulwahab Muhammed, who she met during her first visit to Egypt.

== Recording career ==
Latifa's earliest albums were released in 1984. The album Mesa Al Jamal ("Evening Of Beauty") made Latifa Bint Alayah Al Arfaoui famous in Egypt. Akthar Min Roohi ("More than My Soul") was released in 1986. Latifa began singing Arab pop songs with music by Ammar El Sherei and lyrics by Abdulwahab Muhammed. The album was successful across the Arab world, with shorter songs and the addition of different influences such as tango music. She recorded a music video for the hit single "Ew'ah Tegheer" ("Don't Be Jealous"). The success of this album allowed Latifa to buy half the shares of her producer's company and studio, La Reine. Since then, she has co-produced all of her albums and music videos.

In 1997, Latifa released the album Al Ghinwa ("The Song"), considered a follow-up to "Akthar Min Roohi" from a previous album. Latifa then began performing a new style of songs called Qasa'ed Fos'ha. Her next album, 1998's Taloomoni Al Donya ("The World Blames Me"), featured Latifa singing lyrics written by the poet Nizar Qabbani.

Latifa returned in 1999 with a hit album, known in the Arab world as Wadeh ("Clear") and internationally as Inchallah ("God willing"). The album was distributed by Universal Music France, and was the first album Latifa had performed in a foreign language. The Franco-Arab song "Inchallah" made the Elle Magazine top 5. "Inchallah" ("God willing"), "Kerehtak" ("I Hated You") and "Wadeh" ("Clear") were popular singles in the Arab World.

The 2002 variety album Desert Roses and Arabian Rhythms II featured Latifa performing an Arab Mawwal in the song "Take Me I'm Yours," and singing a small part in both Arabic and English with Chris Difford and Glenn Tilbrook of the band Squeeze. Latifa won the World Music Award 2004 for best selling artist in the Middle East and North Africa for the album Ma Etrohsh Ba'ed ("Don't go away"), produced in 2003 by Alam El Phan (Mazzica TV). In 2004, Latifa produced an album distributed by Warner Brothers France, Les Plus Belles Chansons De Latifa ("Latifa's Best Songs"). Although the album was mostly a collection of greatest hits, it also featured a brand-new Raï song called "Khalleoni" ("Let Me"), her first attempt at Raï. In November 2006, Latifa signed another contract with Rotana to distribute her records across the Arab World.

In February 2016, Latifa released her single "Fresh".

== Actress ==
In 2001 Latifa starred in Youssef Chahine's Silence, We're Rolling. In 2007 she appeared as herself in the seventh episode of Lahazat Harega, the Arabic version of E.R..

== Discography ==
Over the course of her career, Latifa has released more than 20 albums and singles, and more than 70 music videos.

== See also ==
- Ila Tughat al-Alam
- Arabic pop
- Arabic music
- Raï
