= Tafila Technical University =

Public university in Jordan

- جامعة الطفيلة التقنية
- Type: Public
- Established: 2005
- Affiliations: IAU, FUIW, AArU
- Academic staff: 259
- Administrative staff: 620
- Students: 7,800
- Location: Tafila, Jordan
- Website: www.ttu.edu.jo

Tafila Technical University (TTU) (Arabic جامعة الطفيلة التقنية), is a public university in Jordan. established in accordance to a royal decree issued to establish the Tafila Technical University (TTU). The (TTU) was founded in January, 2005 in order to develop the educational process in Jordan.

== Academics ==
Tafila Technical University incorporates the following 7 colleges:

- College of Arts
- College of Engineering
- College of Sciences
- College of Business
- College of Educational Sciences
- College of Information Technology and Communication
- Technical Community College

== College of Arts ==
The College of Arts offers B.A degrees in two programs: English Language and Literature and Arabic Language and Literature. The Department of Humanities and Social Sciences is a non degree-granting department.

In addition, the College of Arts offers educational courses for associate diploma students affiliated with the TTU's Intermediate Technical Community College.

== College of Engineering (Run) ==
The College of Engineering was established on January 17, 2005. Now, it has five academic departments: Computer and Telecommunication Eng., Electrical Eng., Mechanical Eng., Natural Resources Eng., and Civil Engineering.

== College of Sciences ==
The College of Sciences has three academic departments: Applied Physics, Mathematics & IT, and Chemistry.

== College of Information Technology and Communication ==
The time has come for the completion of the completion of the generation of information, and accordingly, and its establishment came, the completion of the development of the communications technology sector in Jordan and the region.

== College of Business ==
It was established in 2005. Now, it has three academic departments: Business Economics, Accounting, and Business Management. It offers B.A degrees in the aforementioned majors.

== College of Educational Sciences ==
The CES offers B.A degrees in four programs: Child Education, Special Education, Classroom-Teacher Education, and Classroom-Teacher/ English language. It also offers a higher diploma in education. The number of faculty is 30 for the academic year 2008–2009.

== Centers ==
There are six centers at TTU. Most of them are newly established and their work is mainly administrative. The centers are:

- Computer & Information Technology Center (CITC)
  This center was established towards the end of 2006. It maintains the university's network which uses a (Single Mode Fiber). All of the university buildings are connected to the LAN network and have access to the internet.
- National Center for Oil Shale Research
- Center of Faculty Performance Evaluation & Development
- Quality Assurance Management Center
- Community Partnership Center
  The mission of the Community Partnership Center is to link university resources with urban and rural grassroots community groups.
- Language Center
  This center offers language courses for university students.

== See also ==
- List of Islamic educational institutions
