= Ila Tughat al-Alam =

Arabic poem written by Tunisian poet Echebbi

Ilá Ṭughāt al-‘Ālam (Arabic: الى طغاة العالم, English: To the Tyrants of the World), also known as Ela Toghat Al Alaam, is a poem written in the early 1900s by the Tunisian poet Aboul-Qacem Echebbi during the French conquest of Tunisia.

It is also a song and a music video produced in the year 2002, during the second Intifada, by the Tunisian vocalist Latifa who sang the poem and dedicated it to Ariel Sharon and George W. Bush.

A snapshot of Latifa clip "Ela Toghat Al Alaam" (To the tyrants of the world). The little girl is 6 month old Eman Hijjo, killed by Israeli troops.

== English translation ==
Hark! You tyrannous dictator,
lover of darkness, enemy of life.
You mocked the cries of the weak,
and your palm is stained with their blood.
You set out tarnishing the enchantment of existence,
sowing the thorns of anguish among the hills.

Slow down! Let not the Spring deceive you,
nor the serenity of the sky, nor the glow of the morning.
For in the vast horizon lurks the power of darkness,
the bombardment of thunder, and the raging of winds.
Beware! Under the ashes burns the flame,
and he who sows the thorns harvests the wounds.

Think! Whenever you reap
the heads of men and the flowers of hope,
wherever you water the heart of the earth with blood
and inebriate it with tears,
the flood will carry you away, the torrent of blood,
and the burning rage will consume you.

== Verse translation ==
Imperious despot, insolent in strife,

Lover of ruin, enemy of life!

You mock the anguish of an impotent land

Whose people's blood has stained your tyrant hand,

And desecrate the magic of this earth,

sowing your thorns, to bring despair to birth,

Patience! Let not the Spring delude you now,

The morning light, the skies’ unclouded brow;

Fear gathers in the broad horizon's murk

Where winds are rising, and deep thunders lurk;

When the weak weeps, receive him not with scorn—

Who soweth thorns, shall not his flesh be torn?

Wait! Where you thought to reap the lives of men,

The flowers of hope, never to bloom again,

Where you have soaked the furrows’ heart with blood,

Drenched them with tears, until they overflowed,

A gale of flame shall suddenly consume,

A bloody torrent sweep you to your doom!

== Original text ==
ألا أيها الظالم المستبد

حبيب الظلام عدو الحياه

سخرت بأنات شعب ضعيف

و كفك مخضوبة من دماه

و سرت تشوه سحر الوجود

و تبذر شوك الاسى في رباه

رويدك لا يخدعنك الربيع

و صحو الفضاء و ضوء الصباح

ففي الافق الرحب هول الظلام و قصف الرعود و عصف الرياح

حذار فتحت الرماد اللهيب

و من يبذر الشوك يجن الجراح

تأمل هنالك انى حصدت رؤوس الورى و زهور الأمل

و رويت بالدم قلب التراب اشربته الدمع حتى ثمل

ســيجرفك الســيل ، سيل الدماء

و يأكلك العاصف المشتعل
