= Down syndrome =

Genetic disorder

- Other names: Down's syndrome, Down's, trisomy 21
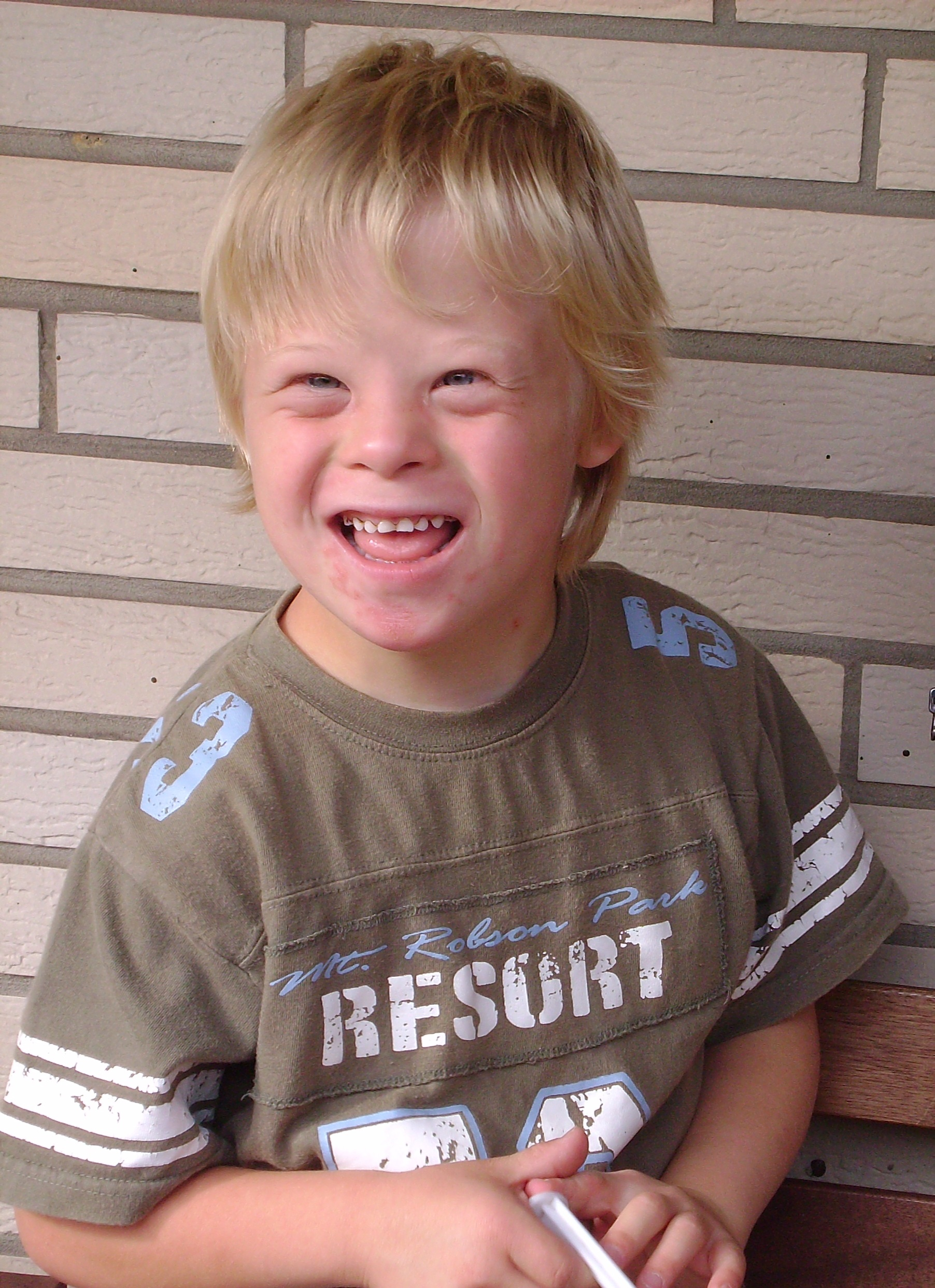
- An eight-year-old boy displaying characteristic facial features of Down syndrome
- Specialty: Medical genetics, pediatrics
- Symptoms: Delayed development, characteristic physical features, mild to moderate intellectual disability
- Usual onset: Mostly at conception, rarely after fertilization
- Duration: Lifelong
- Causes: Third copy of chromosome 21
- Risk factors: Older age of mother, prior affected child
- Diagnostic method: Prenatal screening, genetic testing
- Treatment: Physical therapy, occupational therapy, speech therapy, educational support, supported work environment
- Prognosis: Life expectancy 50 to 60 years (developed world)
- Frequency: 5.4 million (0.1%)
- Named after: John Langdon Down

Down syndrome or Down's syndrome, also known as trisomy 21, is a genetic disorder caused by the presence of all or part of a third copy of chromosome 21. It is usually associated with developmental delays, mild to moderate intellectual disability, and characteristic physical features.

The parents of the affected individual are usually genetically normal. The incidence of the syndrome increases with the age of the mother, from less than 0.1% for 20-year-old mothers to 3% for those of age 45. It is believed to occur by chance, with no known behavioral activity or environmental factor that changes the probability. Three different genetic forms have been identified. The most common, trisomy 21, involves an extra copy of chromosome 21 in all cells. The extra chromosome is provided at conception as the egg and sperm combine. Translocation Down syndrome involves attachment of extra chromosome 21 material. In 1–2% of cases, the additional chromosome is added in the embryo stage and only affects some of the cells in the body; this is known as mosaic Down syndrome.

Down syndrome can be identified during pregnancy by prenatal screening, followed by diagnostic testing, or after birth by direct observation and genetic testing. Since the introduction of screening, Down syndrome pregnancies are often aborted (rates varying from 50 to 85% depending on maternal age, gestational age, and maternal race/ethnicity).

There is no cure for Down syndrome. Education and proper care have been shown to provide better quality of life. Some children with Down syndrome are educated in typical school classes, while others require more specialized education. Some individuals with Down syndrome graduate from high school, and a few attend post-secondary education. In adulthood, about 20% in the United States do some paid work, with many requiring a sheltered work environment. Caregiver support in financial and legal matters is often needed. Life expectancy is around 50 to 60 years in the developed world, with proper health care. Regular screening for health issues common in Down syndrome is recommended throughout the person's life.

Down syndrome is the most common chromosomal abnormality, occurring in about 1 in 1,000 babies born worldwide, and one in 700 in the US. In 2015, there were 5.4 million people with Down syndrome globally, of whom 27,000 died, down from 43,000 deaths in 1990. The syndrome is named after British physician John Langdon Down, who dedicated his medical practice to the cause. Some aspects were described earlier by French psychiatrist Jean-Étienne Dominique Esquirol in 1838 and French physician Édouard Séguin in 1844. The genetic cause was discovered in 1959.

== Signs and symptoms ==
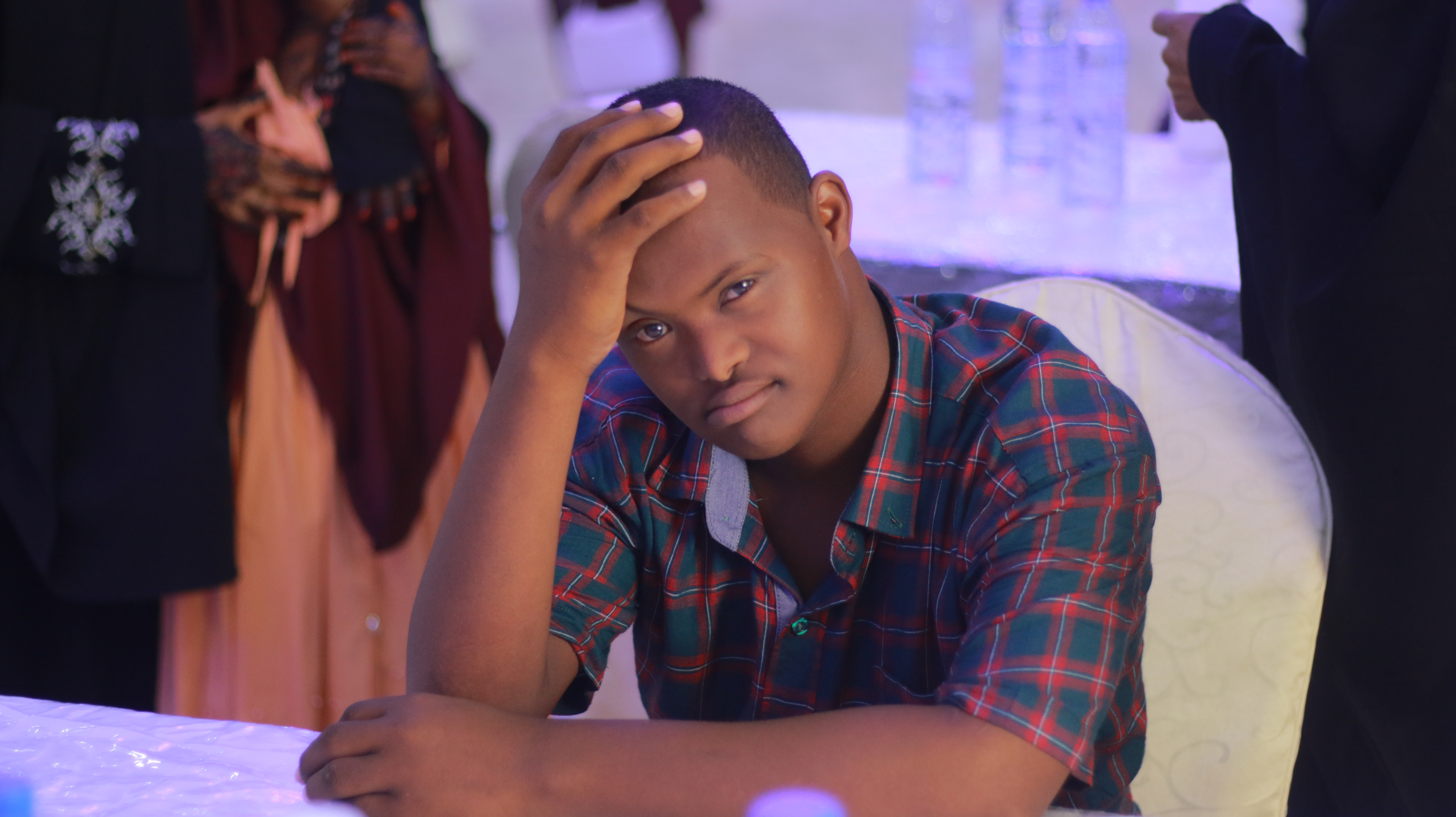
A man with Down syndrome

Those with Down syndrome nearly always have physical and intellectual disabilities. As adults, their mental abilities are typically similar to those of an eight- or nine-year-old. At the same time, their emotional and social awareness is very high. They can have poor immune function and generally reach developmental milestones at a later age. They have an increased risk of a number of health concerns, such as congenital heart disease, epilepsy, leukemia, and thyroid diseases.

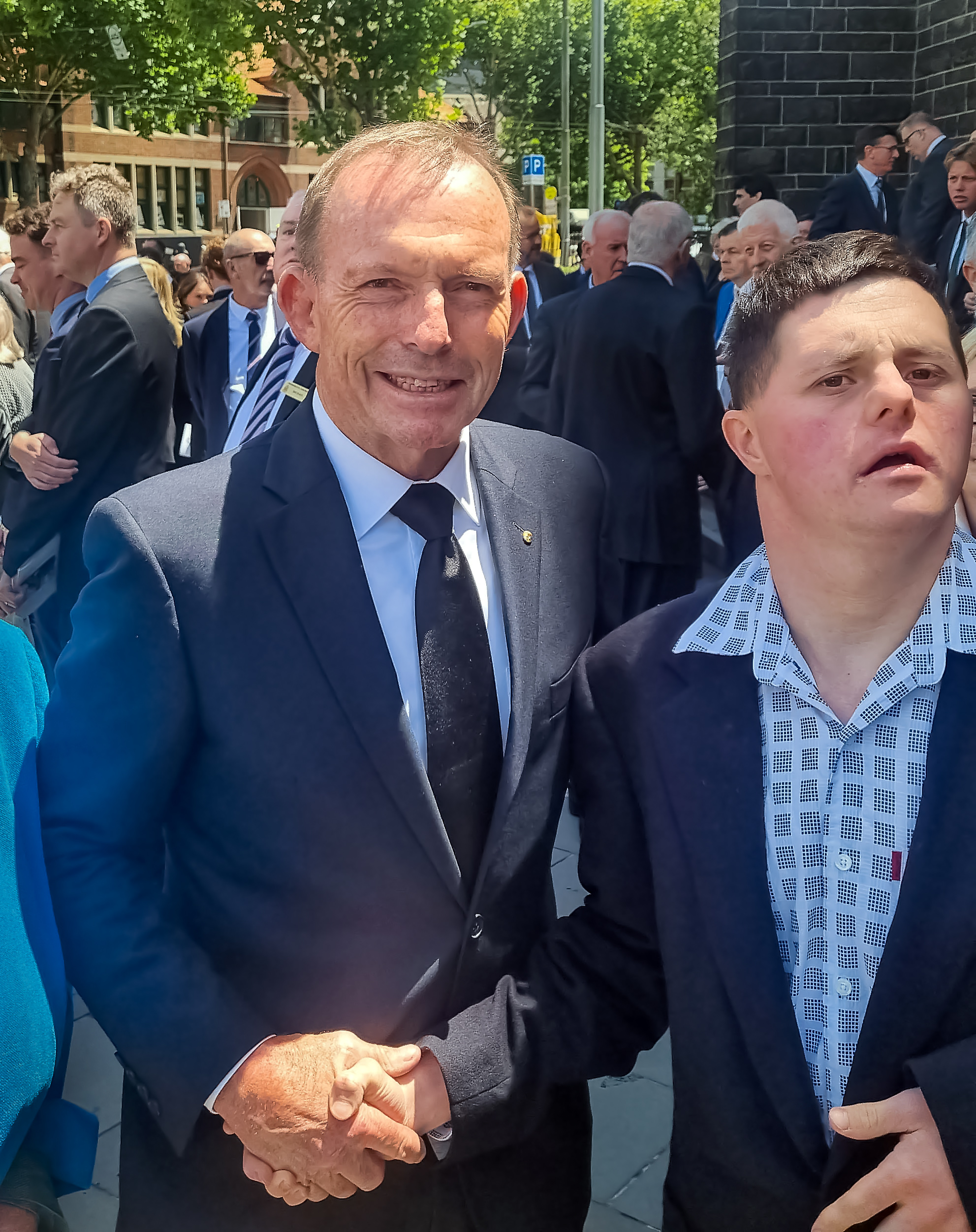
A man with Down syndrome in his 20s pictured with former Australian Prime Minister Tony Abbott

Characteristics	Percentage	Characteristics	Percentage
Mental impairment	99%	Abnormal teeth	60%
Stunted growth	90%	Slanted eyes	60%
Umbilical hernia	90%	Shortened hands	60%
Increased skin on back of neck	80%	Short neck	60%
Low muscle tone	80%	Obstructive sleep apnea	60%
Narrow roof of mouth	76%	Bent fifth finger tip	57%
Flat head	75%	Brushfield spots in the iris	56%
Flexible ligaments	75%	Single transverse palmar crease	53%
Proportionally large tongue	75%	Protruding tongue	47%
Abnormal outer ears	70%	Congenital heart disease	40%
Flattened nose	68%	Strabismus	≈35%
Separation of first and second toes	68%	Undescended testicles	20%

=== Physical ===
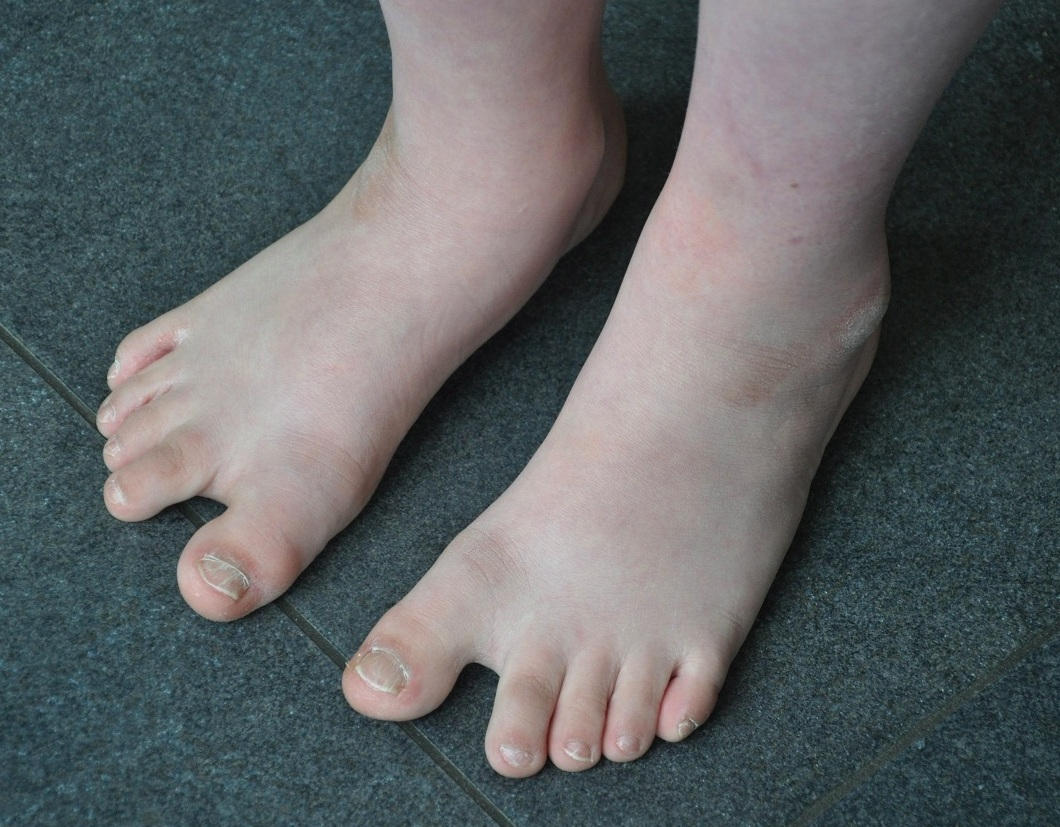
Feet of a boy with Down syndrome, showing the deviated first toes

People with Down syndrome may have these physical characteristics: a small chin, epicanthic folds, low muscle tone, a flat nasal bridge, and a protruding tongue. A protruding tongue is caused by low tone and weak facial muscles, and often corrected with myofunctional exercises. Some characteristic airway features can lead to obstructive sleep apnea in around half of those with Down syndrome. Other common features include: excessive joint flexibility, extra space between big toe and second toe, a single crease of the palm, and short fingers.

Instability of the atlantoaxial joint occurs in about 1–2%. Atlantoaxial instability may cause myelopathy due to cervical spinal cord compression later in life, this often manifests as new onset weakness, problems with co-ordination, bowel or bladder incontinence, and gait dysfunction. Serial imaging cannot reliably predict future cervical cord compression, but changes can be seen on neurological exam. The condition is surgically corrected with spine surgery.

Growth in height is slower, resulting in adults who tend to have short stature—the average height for men is 154 centimetres (5 feet 1 inch), and for women is 142 centimetres (4 feet 8 inches). Individuals with Down syndrome are at increased risk for obesity as they age due to increased risk of hypothyroidism, other medical issues and lifestyle. Growth charts have been developed specifically for children with Down syndrome.

=== Neurological ===
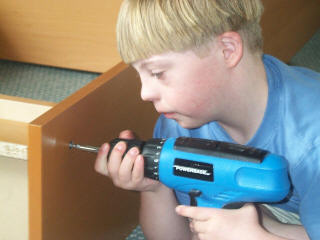
A boy with Down syndrome using a cordless drill to assemble a book case

This syndrome causes about a third of cases of intellectual disability. Many developmental milestones are delayed with the ability to crawl typically occurring around 8–22 months rather than 6–12 months, and the ability to walk independently typically occurring around 1–4 years rather than 9–18 months. Walking is acquired in 50% of children after 24 months.

Most individuals with Down syndrome have mild (IQ: 50–69) or moderate (IQ: 35–50) intellectual disability with some cases having severe (IQ: 20–35) difficulties. Those with mosaic Down syndrome typically have IQ scores 10–30 points higher than that. As they age, the gap tends to widen between people with Down syndrome and their same-age peers.

Commonly, individuals with Down syndrome have better language understanding than ability to speak. Babbling typically emerges around 15 months on average. 10–45% of those with Down syndrome have either a stutter or rapid and irregular speech, making it difficult to understand them. After reaching 30 years of age, some may lose their ability to speak.

They typically do fairly well with social skills. Behavior problems are not generally as great an issue as in other syndromes associated with intellectual disability. In children with Down syndrome, mental illness occurs in nearly 30% with autism occurring in 5–10%. People with Down syndrome experience a wide range of emotions. While people with Down syndrome are generally happy, symptoms of depression and anxiety may develop in early adulthood.

Children and adults with Down syndrome are at increased risk of epileptic seizures, which occur in 5–10% of children and up to 50% of adults. This includes an increased risk of a specific type of seizure called infantile spasms. Many (15%) who live 40 years or longer develop Alzheimer's disease. In those who reach 60 years of age, 50–70% have the disease.

Down syndrome regression disorder is a sudden regression with neuropsychiatric symptoms such as catatonia, possibly caused by an autoimmune disease. It primarily appears in teenagers and younger adults born with Down syndrome.

=== Senses ===
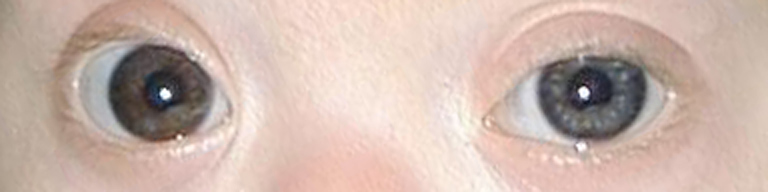
Brushfield spots, visible in the irises of a baby with Down syndrome

Hearing and vision disorders occur in more than half of people with Down syndrome.

==== Ocular findings ====
Brushfield spots (small white or grayish/brown spots on the periphery of the iris), upward slanting palpebral fissures (the opening between the upper and lower lids) and epicanthal folds (folds of skin between the upper eyelid and the nose) are clinical signs at birth suggesting the diagnosis of Down syndrome None of these requires treatment.

Visually significant congenital cataracts (clouding of the lens of the eye) occur more frequently with Down syndrome. Neonates with Down syndrome should be screened for cataract because early recognition and referral reduce the risk of vision loss from amblyopia. Dot-like opacities in the cortex of the lens (cerulean cataract) are present in up to 50% of people with Down syndrome, but may be followed without treatment if they are not visually significant.

Strabismus, nystagmus and nasolacrimal duct obstruction occur more frequently in children with Down syndrome. Screening for these diagnoses should begin within six months of birth. Strabismus is more often acquired than congenital. Early diagnosis and treatment of strabismus reduces the risk of vision loss from amblyopia. In Down syndrome, the presence of epicanthal folds may give the false impression of strabismus, referred to as pseudostrabismus. Nasolacrimal duct obstruction, which causes tearing (epiphora), is more frequently bilateral and multifactorial than in children without Down syndrome.

Refractive error is more common with Down syndrome, though the rate may not differ until after twelve months of age compared to children without Down syndrome. Early screening is recommended to identify and treat significant refractive error with glasses or contact lenses. Poor accommodation (ability to focus on close objects) is associated with Down syndrome, which may mean bifocals are indicated.

In keratoconus, the cornea progressively thins and bulges into a cone shape, causing visual blurring or distortion. Keratoconus first presents in the teen years and progresses into the thirties. Down syndrome is a strong risk factor for developing keratoconus, and onset may be occur at a younger age than in those without Down syndrome. Eye rubbing is also a risk factor for developing keratoconus. It is speculated that chronic eye irritation from blepharitis may increase eye rubbing in Down syndrome, contributing to the increased prevalence of keratoconus.

An association between glaucoma and Down syndrome is often cited. Glaucoma in children with Down syndrome is uncommon, with a prevalence of less than 1%. It is currently unclear if the prevalence of glaucoma in those with Down syndrome differs from that in the absence of Down syndrome.

Estimates of prevalence of ocular findings in Down syndrome vary widely depending on the study. Some prevalence estimates follow. Vision problems have been observed in 38–80% of cases. Brushfield spots are present in 38–85% of individuals. Between 20 and 50% have strabismus. Cataracts occur in 15%, and may be present at birth. Keratoconus may occur in as many as 21–30%.

==== Hearing loss ====
Hearing problems are found in 50–90% of children with Down syndrome. This is often the result of otitis media with effusion which occurs in 50–70% and chronic ear infections which occur in 40–60%. Ear infections often begin in the first year of life and are partly due to poor eustachian tube function. Excessive ear wax can also cause hearing loss due to obstruction of the outer ear canal. Even a mild degree of hearing loss can have negative consequences for speech, language understanding, and academics. It is important to rule out hearing loss as a factor in social and cognitive deterioration. Age-related hearing loss of the sensorineural type occurs at a much earlier age and affects 10–70% of people with Down syndrome.

=== Heart ===
The rate of congenital heart disease in newborns with Down syndrome is around 40%. Of those with heart disease, about 80% have an atrial septal defect or ventricular septal defect with the former being more common. Congenital heart disease can also put individuals at a higher risk of pulmonary hypertension, where arteries in the lungs narrow and cause inadequate blood oxygenation. Some of the genetic contributions to pulmonary hypertension in individuals with Down syndrome are abnormal lung development, endothelial dysfunction, and proinflammatory genes. Mitral valve problems become common as people age, even in those without heart problems at birth. Other problems that may occur include tetralogy of Fallot and patent ductus arteriosus. People with Down syndrome have a lower risk of hardening of the arteries.

=== Cancer ===
Although the overall risk of cancer in Down syndrome is not changed, the risk of testicular cancer and certain blood cancers, including acute lymphoblastic leukemia (ALL) and acute megakaryoblastic leukemia (AMKL) is increased while the risk of other non-blood cancers is decreased. People with Down syndrome are believed to have an increased risk of developing cancers derived from germ cells whether these cancers are blood- or non-blood-related. In 2008, the World Health Organization (WHO) introduced a distinct classification for myeloid proliferation in individuals with Down syndrome.

==== Blood cancers ====
Leukemia is 10 to 15 times more common in children with Down syndrome. In particular, acute lymphoblastic leukemia (ALL) is 20 times more common and the megakaryoblastic form of acute myeloid leukemia (AML), called acute megakaryoblastic leukemia (AMLK), is 500 times more common. AMKL is a leukemia of megakaryoblasts, the precursors cells to megakaryocytes which form blood platelets. ALL in Down syndrome accounts for 1–3% of all childhood cases of ALL. It occurs most often in those older than nine years or having a white blood cell count greater than 50,000 per microliter and is rare in those younger than one year old. ALL in Down syndrome tends to have poorer outcomes than other cases of ALL in people without Down syndrome. In short, the likelihood of developing AML and ALL is higher in children with Down syndrome compared to those without Down syndrome.

Myeloid leukemia typically precedes Down syndrome and is accompanied by a condition known as transient abnormal myelopoiesis (TAM), which generally disrupts the differentiation of megakaryocytes and erythrocytes. In Down syndrome, AMKL is typically preceded by transient myeloproliferative disease (TMD), a disorder of blood cell production in which non-cancerous megakaryoblasts with a mutation in the GATA1 gene rapidly divide during the later period of pregnancy. GATA1 mutations combined with trisomy 21 contribute to a predisposition to TAM. In trisomy 21, the process of leukemogenesis starts in early fetal life, with genetic factors, including GATA1 mutations, contributing to the development of TAM on the preleukemic pathway. The condition affects 3–10% of babies with Down. While it often spontaneously resolves within three months of birth, it can cause serious blood, liver, or other complications. In about 10% of cases, TMD progresses to AMKL during the three months to five years following its resolution.

==== Non-blood cancers ====
People with Down syndrome have a lower risk of all major solid cancers, including those of lung, breast, and cervix, with the lowest relative rates occurring in those aged 50 years or older. This low risk is thought to be due to an increase in the expression of tumor suppressor genes present on chromosome 21. One exception is testicular germ cell cancer which occurs at a higher rate in Down syndrome.

=== Endocrine ===
Problems of the thyroid gland occur in 20–50% of individuals with Down syndrome. Low thyroid is the most common form, occurring in almost half of all individuals. Thyroid problems can be due to a poorly or nonfunctioning thyroid at birth (known as congenital hypothyroidism) which occurs in 1% or can develop later due to an attack on the thyroid by the immune system resulting in Graves' disease or autoimmune hypothyroidism. Type 1 diabetes mellitus is also more common.

=== Gastrointestinal ===
Constipation occurs in nearly half of people with Down syndrome and may result in changes in behavior. One potential cause is Hirschsprung's disease, occurring in 2–15%, which is due to a lack of nerve cells controlling the colon. Other congenital problems can include duodenal atresia, imperforate anus and gastroesophageal reflux disease. Celiac disease affects about 7–20%.

=== Teeth ===
People with Down syndrome tend to be more susceptible to gingivitis as well as early, severe periodontal disease, necrotising ulcerative gingivitis, and early tooth loss, especially in the lower front teeth. While plaque and poor oral hygiene are contributing factors, the severity of these periodontal diseases cannot be explained solely by external factors. Research suggests that the severity is likely a result of a weakened immune system. The weakened immune system also contributes to increased incidence of yeast infections in the mouth (from Candida albicans).

People with Down syndrome also tend to have a more alkaline saliva resulting in a greater resistance to tooth decay, despite decreased quantities of saliva, less effective oral hygiene habits, and higher plaque indexes.

Higher rates of tooth wear and bruxism are also common. Other common oral manifestations of Down syndrome include enlarged hypotonic tongue, crusted and hypotonic lips, mouth breathing, narrow palate with crowded teeth, class III malocclusion with an underdeveloped maxilla and posterior crossbite, delayed exfoliation of baby teeth and delayed eruption of adult teeth, shorter roots on teeth, and often missing and malformed (usually smaller) teeth. Less common manifestations include cleft lip and palate and enamel hypocalcification (20% prevalence).

Taurodontism, an elongation of the pulp chamber, has a high prevalence in people with DS.

=== Fertility ===
Males with Down syndrome usually do not father children, while females have lower rates of fertility relative to those who are unaffected. Fertility is estimated to be present in 30–50% of females. Menopause usually occurs at an earlier age. The poor fertility in males is thought to be due to problems with sperm development; however, it may also be related to not being sexually active. Without assisted reproductive technologies, around half of the children of someone with Down syndrome will also have the syndrome.

== Cause ==
Down syndrome is caused by having three copies of the genes on chromosome 21, rather than the usual two. The parents of the affected individual are typically genetically normal. Those who have one child with Down syndrome have about a 1% possibility of having a second child with the syndrome, if both parents are found to have normal karyotypes.

There are three types of causes for Down syndrome:

1. Trisomy 21: 94% of the time Down syndrome is caused by an extra copy of chromosome 21 in all cells,
2. Translocation: 4% of cases extra chromosome 21 material is attached to another chromosome,
3. Mosaic: 2% of cases involve mixtures of cells, only some of which have extra chromosome 21.

The most common cause (about 92–95% of cases) is a complete extra copy of chromosome 21, resulting in trisomy 21. In 1–2.5% of cases, some of the cells in the body are normal and others have trisomy 21, known as mosaic Down syndrome. The other common mechanisms that can give rise to Down syndrome include: a Robertsonian translocation, isochromosome, or ring chromosome. These contain additional material from chromosome 21 and occur in about 2.5% of cases. An isochromosome results when the two long arms of a chromosome separate together rather than the long and short arm separating together during egg or sperm development.

=== Trisomy 21 ===
The trisomy 21 version of Down syndrome (also known by the karyotype 47,XX,+21 for females and 47,XY,+21 for males) is mostly caused by a failure of the 21st chromosome to separate during egg or sperm development, known as nondisjunction. As a result, a sperm or egg cell is produced with an extra copy of chromosome 21; this cell thus has 24 chromosomes. When combined with a normal cell from the other parent, the baby has 47 chromosomes, with three copies of chromosome 21. About 88% of cases of trisomy 21 result from nonseparation of the chromosomes in the mother, 8% from nonseparation in the father, and 3% after the egg and sperm have merged.

The root cause of the extra full or partial chromosome is still unknown. Most of the time, the extra chromosome results from a random mistake in cell division during early development of the fetus. The mechanism is not inherited. There is no scientific research which shows that environmental factors or the parents' activities contribute to Down syndrome. The only factor that has been linked to the increased chance of having a baby with Down syndrome is advanced parental age. This is mostly associated with advanced maternal age but about 10 per cent of cases are associated with advanced paternal age.

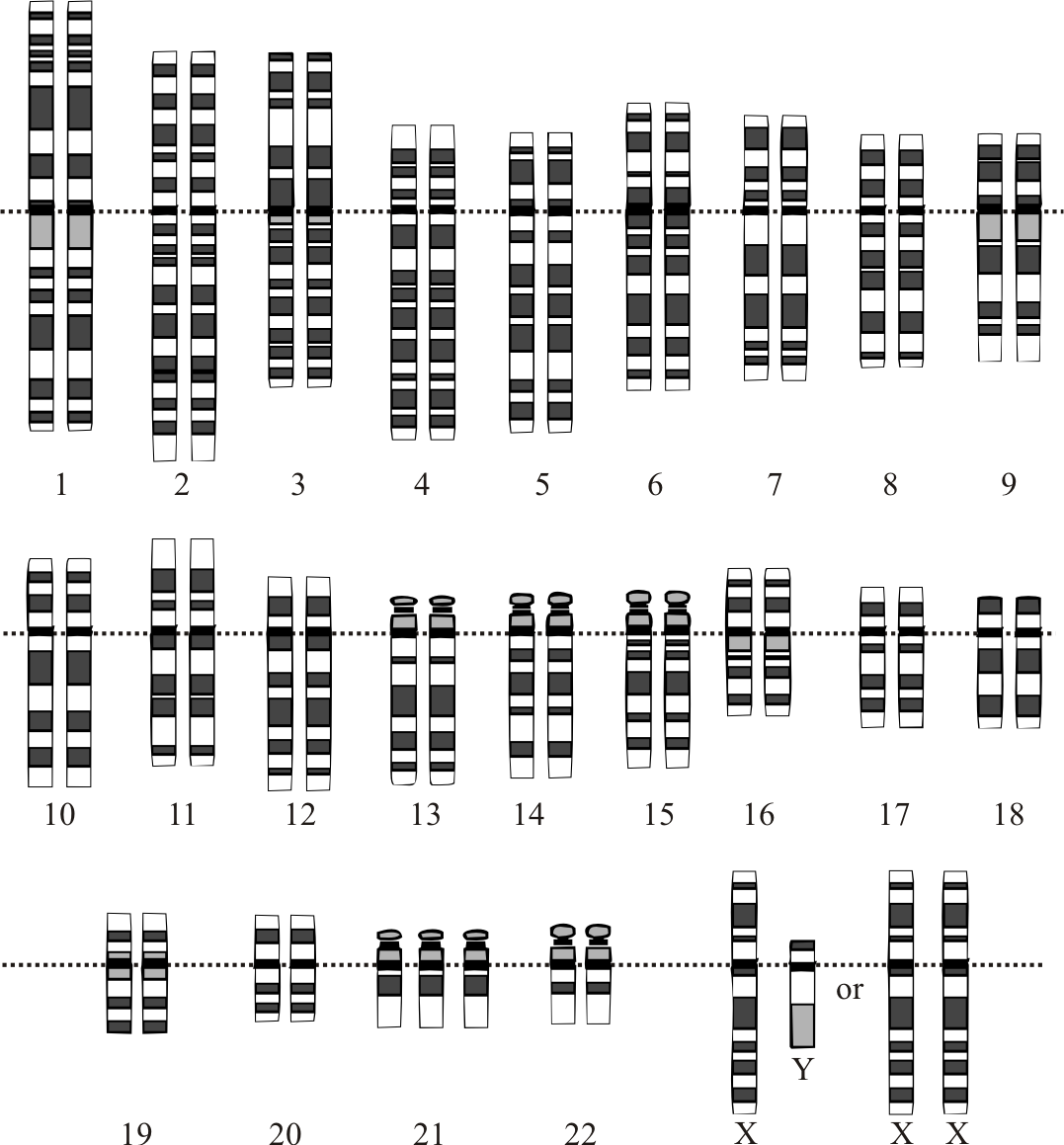
Karyotype for Down syndrome (trisomy 21) showing the three copies of chromosome 21

=== Translocation Down syndrome ===
The extra chromosome 21 material may also occur due to a Robertsonian translocation in 2–4% of cases. In this translocation Down syndrome, the long arm of chromosome 21 is attached to another chromosome, often chromosome 14. In a male affected with Down syndrome, it results in a karyotype of 46XY,t(14q21q). This may be a new mutation or previously present in one of the parents. The parent with such a translocation is usually normal physically and mentally; however, during production of egg or sperm cells, a higher chance of creating reproductive cells with extra chromosome 21 material exists. This results in a 15% chance of having a child with Down syndrome when the mother is affected and a less than 5% probability if the father is affected. The probability of this type of Down syndrome is not related to the mother's age. Some children without Down syndrome may inherit the translocation and have a higher probability of having children of their own with Down syndrome. In this case it is sometimes known as familial Down syndrome.

=== Mosaic Down syndrome ===
Mosaic Down syndrome is diagnosed when there is a mixture of two types of cells: some cells have three copies of chromosome 21 but some cells have the typical two copies of chromosome 21. This type is the least common form of Down syndrome and accounts for only about 1% of all cases. Children with mosaic Down syndrome may have the same features as other children with Down syndrome. However, they may have fewer characteristics of the condition due to the presence of some (or many) cells with a typical number of chromosomes.

== Mechanism ==
The extra genetic material present in Down syndrome results in overexpression of a portion of the 310 genes located on chromosome 21. This overexpression has been estimated at 50%, due to the third copy of the chromosome present. Some research has suggested the Down syndrome critical region is located at bands 21q22.1–q22.3, with this area including genes for the amyloid precursor protein, superoxide dismutase, and likely the ETS2 proto oncogene. Other research, however, has not confirmed these findings. MicroRNAs are also proposed to be involved.

The dementia that occurs in Down syndrome is due to an excess of amyloid beta peptide produced in the brain and is similar to Alzheimer's disease, which also involves amyloid beta build-up. Amyloid beta is processed from amyloid precursor protein, the gene for which is located on chromosome 21. Senile plaques and neurofibrillary tangles are present in nearly all by 35 years of age, though dementia may not be present. It is hypothesized that those with Down syndrome lack a normal number of lymphocytes and produce less antibodies which is said to present an increased risk of infection.

=== Epigenetics ===
Down syndrome is associated with an increased risk of some chronic diseases that are typically associated with older age such as Alzheimer's disease. It is believed that accelerated aging occurs and increases the biological age of tissues, but molecular evidence for this hypothesis is sparse. According to a biomarker of tissue age known as epigenetic clock, it is hypothesized that trisomy 21 increases the age of blood and brain tissue (on average by 6.6 years).

== Diagnosis ==
=== Screening before birth ===
Guidelines recommend screening for Down syndrome to be offered to all pregnant women, regardless of age. A number of tests are used, with varying levels of accuracy. They are typically used in combination to increase the detection rate. None can be definitive; thus, if screening predicts a high possibility of Down syndrome, either amniocentesis or chorionic villus sampling is required to confirm the diagnosis.

==== Ultrasound ====
Prenatal ultrasound can be used to screen for Down syndrome. Findings that indicate increased chances when seen at 14 to 24 weeks of gestation include a small or no nasal bone, large ventricles, nuchal fold thickness, and an abnormal right subclavian artery, among others. The presence or absence of many markers is more accurate. Increased fetal nuchal translucency (NT) indicates an increased possibility of Down syndrome picking up 75–80% of cases and being falsely positive in 6%.

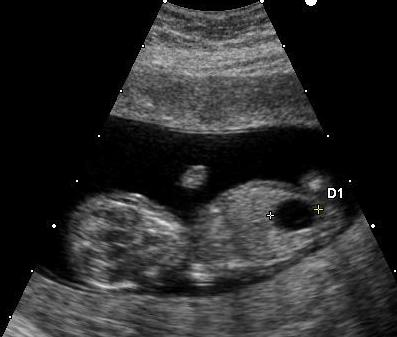
Ultrasound of fetus with Down syndrome showing a large bladder

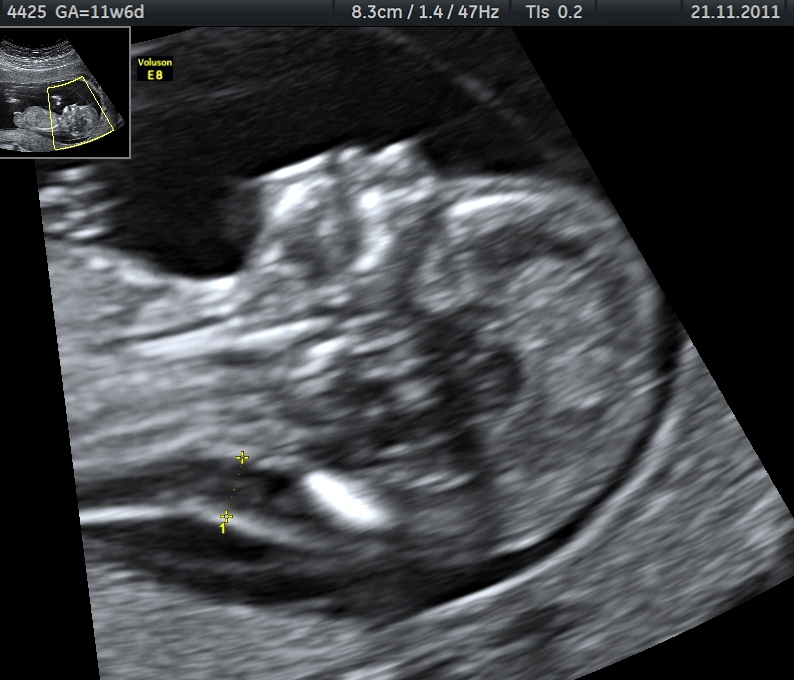
Enlarged NT and absent nasal bone in a fetus at 11 weeks with Down syndrome

==== Blood tests ====
Several blood markers can be measured to predict the chances of Down syndrome during the first or second trimester. Testing in both trimesters is sometimes recommended and test results are often combined with ultrasound results. In the second trimester, often two or three tests are used in combination with two or three of: α-fetoprotein, unconjugated estriol, total hCG, and free βhCG detecting about 60–70% of cases.

Testing of the mother's blood for fetal DNA is being studied and appears promising in the first trimester. The International Society for Prenatal Diagnosis considers it a reasonable screening option for those women whose pregnancies are at a high likelihood of trisomy 21. Accuracy has been reported at 98.6% in the first trimester of pregnancy. Confirmatory testing by invasive techniques (amniocentesis, CVS) is still required to confirm the screening result.

==== Combinations ====
First- and second-trimester screening
Screen	Week of pregnancy when performed	Detection rate	False positive	Description
Combined test	10–13.5 wks	82–87%	5%	Uses ultrasound to measure nuchal translucency in addition to blood tests for free or total beta-hCG and PAPP-A
Quad screen	15–20 wks	81%	5%	Measures the maternal serum alpha-fetoprotein, unconjugated estriol, hCG, and inhibin-A
Integrated test	15–20 wks	94–96%	5%	Is a combination of the quad screen, PAPP-A, and NT
Cell-free fetal DNA	From 10 wks	96–100%	0.3%	A blood sample is taken from the mother by venipuncture and is sent for DNA analysis.

==== Efficacy ====
For combinations of ultrasonography and non-genetic blood tests, screening in both the first and second trimesters is better than just screening in the first trimester. Common screening techniques in use are able to pick up 90–95% of cases, with a false-positive rate of 2–5%. If Down syndrome occurs in one in 500 pregnancies with a 90% detection rate and the test used has a 5% false-positive rate, of 28 women who test positive on screening, only one will have a fetus with Down syndrome confirmed. If the screening test has a 2% false-positive rate, this means of 11 women who test positive on screening, only one will have a fetus with Down syndrome.

==== Invasive genetic testing ====
Amniocentesis and chorionic villus sampling are more reliable tests, but they increase the risk of miscarriage by between 0.5–1%. The risk of limb problems may be increased in the offspring if chorionic villus sampling is performed before 10 weeks.

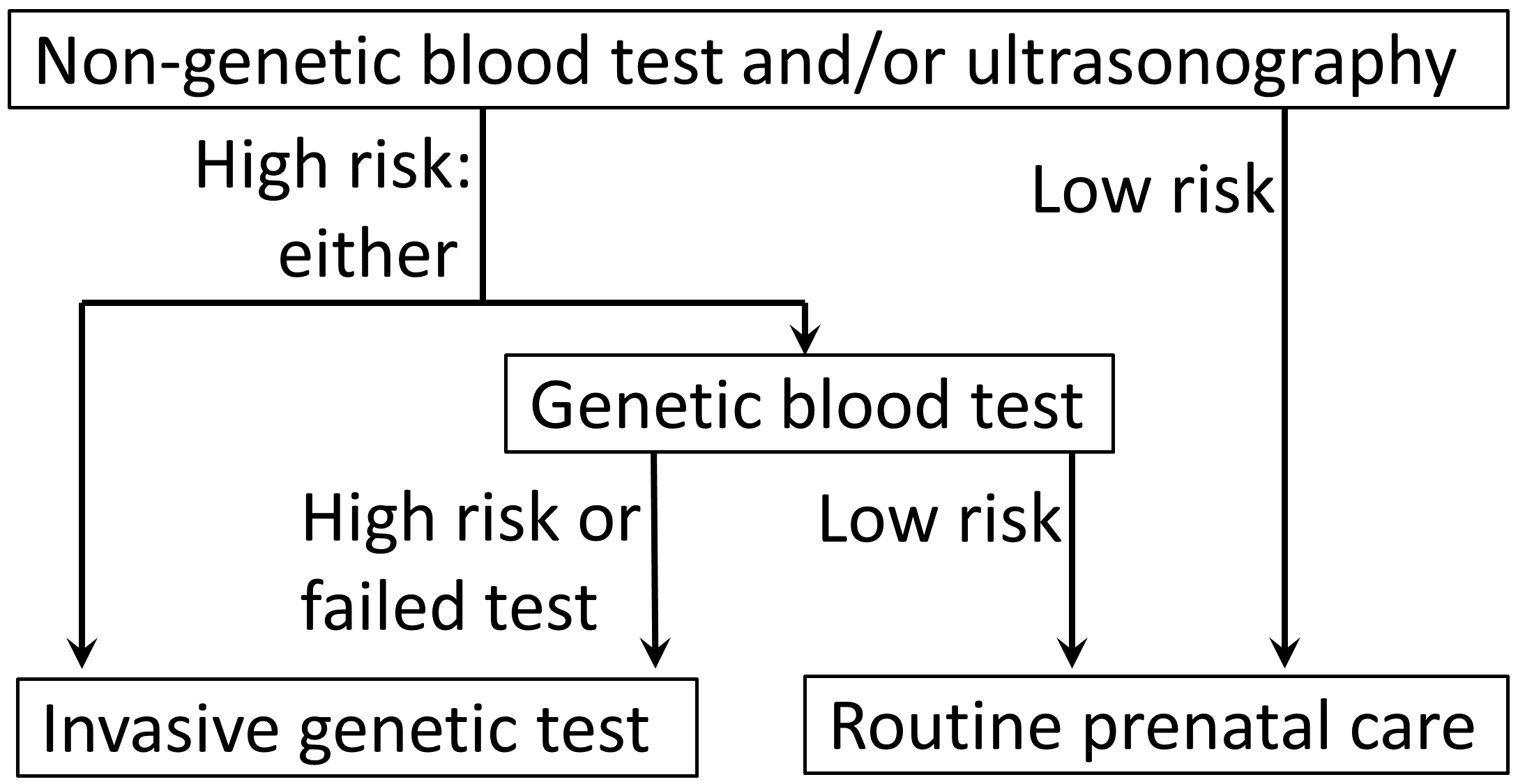
An example of an algorithm for determining the indication for prenatal genetic testing of Down syndrome

The risk from the procedure is greater the earlier it is performed, thus amniocentesis is not recommended before 15 weeks gestational age and chorionic villus sampling before 10 weeks gestational age.

=== Abortion rates ===
By 1999, about 92% of pregnancies in Europe with a diagnosis of Down syndrome were terminated, representing the highest rate of terminations in response to prenatal detection of genetic conditions. As a result, there is almost no one with Down syndrome in Iceland and Denmark, where screening is commonplace. In the United States, the termination rate after diagnosis is around 75%, but varies from 61 to 93%, depending on the population surveyed. Rates are lower among women who are younger and have decreased over time. When asked if they would have a termination if their fetus tested positive, 23–33% said yes, when high-risk pregnant women were asked, 46–86% said yes, and when women who screened positive are asked, 89–97% say yes.

=== After birth ===
A diagnosis can often be suspected based on the child's physical appearance at birth. An analysis of the child's chromosomes is needed to confirm the diagnosis, and to determine if a translocation is present, as this may help determine the chances of the child's parents having further children with Down syndrome.

== Management ==
Efforts such as early childhood intervention, therapies, screening for common medical issues, a good family environment, and work-related training can improve the development of children with Down syndrome and provide good quality of life. Common therapies utilized include physical therapy, occupational therapy and speech therapy. Education and proper care can provide a positive quality of life. Typical childhood vaccinations are recommended.

=== Health screening ===
Recommended screening
Testing	Children	Adults
Hearing	6 months, 12 months, then yearly	3–5 years
T4 and TSH	6 months, then yearly	
Eyes	6 months, then yearly	3–5 years
Teeth	2 years, then every 6 months	
Celiac disease	Between 2 and 3 years of age, or earlier if symptoms occur	
Sleep study	3 to 4 years, or earlier if symptoms of obstructive sleep apnea occur	
Neck X-rays	Between 3 and 5 years of age	

A number of health organizations have issued recommendations for screening those with Down syndrome for particular diseases. This is recommended to be done systematically.

At birth, all children should get an electrocardiogram and ultrasound of the heart. Surgical repair of heart problems may be required as early as three months of age. Heart valve problems may occur in young adults, and further ultrasound evaluation may be needed in adolescents and in early adulthood. Due to the elevated risk of testicular cancer, some recommend checking the person's testicles yearly.

=== Cognitive development ===
Some people with Down syndrome experience hearing loss. In this instance, hearing aids or other amplification devices can be useful for language learning. Speech therapy may be useful and is recommended to be started around nine months of age. As those with Down syndrome typically have good hand-eye coordination, learning sign language is a helpful communication tool. Augmentative and alternative communication methods, such as pointing, body language, objects, or pictures, are often used to help with communication. Behavioral issues and mental illness are typically managed with counseling or medications.

Education programs before reaching school age may be useful. School-age children with Down syndrome may benefit from inclusive education (whereby students of differing abilities are placed in classes with their peers of the same age), provided some adjustments are made to the curriculum. In the United States, the Individuals with Disabilities Education Act of 1975 requires public schools generally to allow attendance by students with Down syndrome.

Individuals with Down syndrome may learn better visually. Drawing may help with language, speech, and reading skills. Children with Down syndrome still often have difficulty with sentence structure and grammar, as well as developing the ability to speak clearly. Several types of early intervention can help with cognitive development. Efforts to develop motor skills include physical therapy, speech and language therapy, and occupational therapy. Physical therapy focuses specifically on motor development and teaching children to interact with their environment. Speech and language therapy can help prepare for later language. Lastly, occupational therapy can help with skills needed for later independence.

=== Physical therapy ===
Therapeutic exercise helps individuals with Down syndrome improve muscle strength, balance, coordination, and gait. Therapeutic exercise is widely used to improve motor function. Interventions typically include aerobic training, resistance (strength) training, balance exercises, and neuromuscular activities. These programs are often structured with specific parameters such as frequency, intensity, and duration to target functional outcomes. A 2023 systematic review and meta-analysis found that combined aerobic and resistance training significantly improves muscle strength in both upper and lower extremities, while aerobic exercise improves gait parameters and dynamic balance. Improvements in these areas may enhance functional mobility and the ability to perform activities of daily living. However, the overall certainty of evidence is considered low to moderate. For children ages 0-3, there is some evidence that therapeutic exercises such as aerobic treadmill training may help gait and motor development.

=== Other ===
Tympanostomy tubes are often needed and often more than one set during the person's childhood. Tonsillectomy is also often done to help with sleep apnea and throat infections. Surgery does not correct every instance of sleep apnea and a continuous positive airway pressure (CPAP) machine may be useful in those cases.

Efforts to prevent respiratory syncytial virus (RSV) infection with human monoclonal antibodies should be considered, especially in those with heart problems. In those who develop dementia there is no evidence for memantine, donepezil, rivastigmine, or galantamine.

== Prognosis ==
Deaths due to Down syndrome per million persons in 2012 0 1 2 3 4 5 6 7–8 9–16

Between 5–15% of children with Down syndrome in Sweden attend regular school. Some graduate from high school; however, most do not. Of those with intellectual disability in the United States who attended high school about 40% graduated. Many learn to read and write and some are able to do paid work. In adulthood about 20% in the United States do paid work in some capacity. In Sweden, however, less than 1% have regular jobs. Many are able to live semi-independently, but they often require help with financial, medical, and legal matters. Those with mosaic Down syndrome usually have better outcomes.

Individuals with Down syndrome have a higher risk of early death than the general population. This is most often from heart problems or infections. Following improved medical care, particularly for heart and gastrointestinal problems, the life expectancy has increased. This increase has been from 12 years in 1912, to 25 years in the 1980s, to 50 to 60 years in the developed world in the 2000s. Data collected between the 1985–2003 showed between 4–12% infants with Down syndrome die in the first year of life. The probability of long-term survival is partly determined by the presence of heart problems. From research at the turn of the century, it tracked those with congenital heart problems, showing 60% survived to at least 10 years and 50% survived to at least 30 years of age. The research failed to track further aging beyond 30 years. In those without heart problems, 85% studied survived to at least 10 years and 80% survived to at least 30 years of age. It is estimated that 10% lived to 70 years of age in the early 2000s. Much of this data is outdated and life expectancy has drastically improved with more equitable healthcare and continuous advancement of surgical practice. The National Down Syndrome Society provides information regarding raising a child with Down syndrome.

== Epidemiology ==
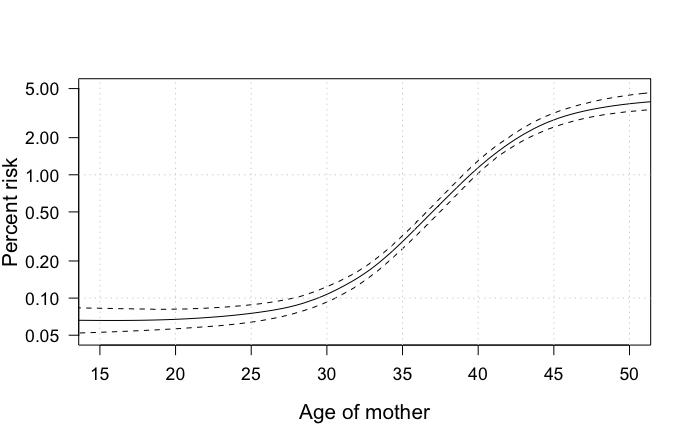
The risk of having a Down syndrome pregnancy in relation to a mother's age

Down syndrome is the most common chromosomal abnormality in humans. Globally, as of 2010, Down syndrome occurs in about 1 per 1,000 births and results in about 17,000 deaths. More children are born with Down syndrome in countries where abortion is not allowed and in countries where pregnancy more commonly occurs at a later age. About 1.4 per 1,000 live births in the United States and 1.1 per 1,000 live births in Norway are affected. In the 1950s, in the United States, it occurred in 2 per 1,000 live births with the decrease since then due to prenatal screening and abortions. The number of pregnancies with Down syndrome is more than two times greater with many spontaneously aborting. It is the cause of 8% of all congenital disorders.

Maternal age affects the chances of having a pregnancy with Down syndrome. At age 20, the chance is 1 in 1,441; at age 30, it is 1 in 959; at age 40, it is 1 in 84; and at age 50 it is 1 in 44. Although the probability increases with maternal age, 70% of children with Down syndrome are born to women 35 years of age and younger, because younger people have more children. The father's older age is also a risk factor in women older than 35, but not in women younger than 35, and may partly explain the increase in risk as women age.

== History ==
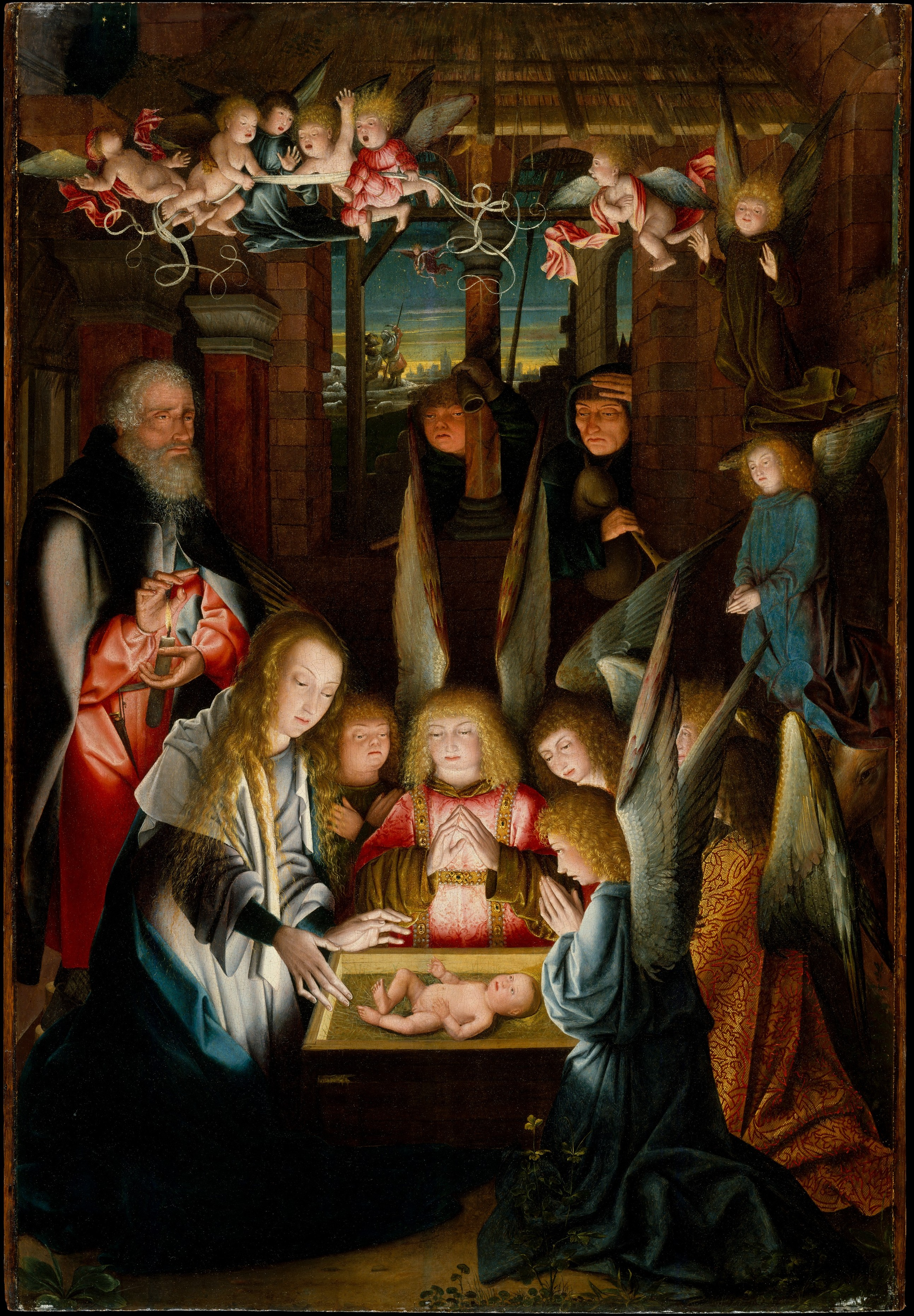
Levitas and Reid have suggested that this early Netherlandish painting, The Adoration of the Christ Child, depicts a person with Down syndrome as one of the angels.

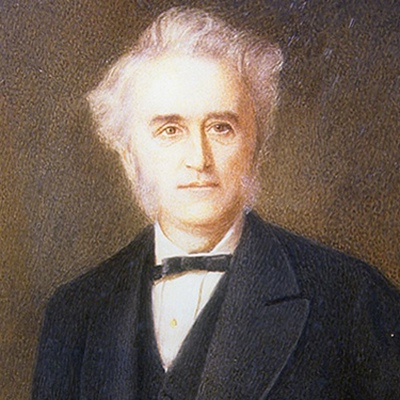
John Langdon Haydon Down first described Down syndrome

The English physician John Langdon Down first described Down syndrome in 1862, recognizing it as a distinct type of mental disability, and again in a more widely published report in 1866. Édouard Séguin described it as separate from cretinism in 1844. By the 20th century, Down syndrome had become the most recognizable form of mental disability.

Due to his perception that children with Down syndrome shared facial similarities with those of Blumenbach's Mongoloid race, John Langdon Down used the term "Mongoloid". Down felt that the symptoms of Down syndrome in Europeans provided evidence that all peoples were genetically related:

If these great racial divisions are fixed and definite, how comes it that disease is able to break down the barrier, and to simulate so closely the features of the members of another division. I cannot but think that the observations which I have recorded, are indications that the differences in the races are not specific but variable. These examples of the result of degeneracy among mankind, appear to me to furnish some arguments in favor of the unity of the human species.

In the 1950s with discovery of the underlying cause as being related to chromosomes, concerns about the race-based nature of the name increased.

In 1961, a group of nineteen scientists suggested that "mongolism" had "misleading connotations" and had become "an embarrassing term". The World Health Organization (WHO) dropped the term in 1965 after a request by the delegation from the Mongolian People's Republic. While this terminology continued to be used until the late twentieth century, it is now considered unacceptable and is no longer in common use.

In antiquity, many infants with disabilities were either killed or abandoned. In June 2020, the earliest incidence of Down syndrome was found in genomic evidence from an infant that was buried before 3200 BC at Poulnabrone dolmen in Ireland. Researchers believe that a number of historical pieces of art portray Down syndrome, including pottery from the pre-Columbian Tumaco-La Tolita culture in present-day Colombia and Ecuador, and the 16th-century painting The Adoration of the Christ Child.

In the 20th century, many people with Down syndrome were institutionalized, few of the associated medical problems were treated, and most people died in infancy or early adulthood. With the rise of the eugenics movement, 33 of the then 48 US states and several countries began programs of forced sterilization of individuals with Down syndrome and comparable degrees of disability. Action T4 in Nazi Germany saw the systematic murder of people with Down syndrome made public policy.

With the discovery of karyotype techniques in the 1950s it became possible to identify abnormalities of chromosomal number or shape. In 1959 Jérôme Lejeune reported the discovery that Down syndrome resulted from an extra chromosome. However, Lejeune's claim to the discovery has been disputed, and in 2014 the Scientific Council of the French Federation of Human Genetics unanimously awarded its Grand Prize to his colleague Marthe Gautier for her role in this discovery. The discovery took place in the laboratory of Raymond Turpin at the Hôpital Trousseau in Paris, France. Lejeune and Gautier were both his students.

As a result of this discovery, the condition became known as trisomy 21, especially in European countries. Even before the discovery of its cause, the presence of the syndrome in all races, its association with older maternal age, and its rarity of recurrence had been noticed. Medical texts had assumed it was caused by a combination of inheritable factors that had not been identified. Other theories had focused on injuries sustained during birth.

== Society and culture ==
=== Name ===
Down syndrome is named after John Langdon Down. He was the first person to provide an accurate description of the syndrome. His research that was published in 1866 earned him the recognition as the Father of the syndrome. While others had previously recognized components of the condition, John Langdon Down described the syndrome as a distinct, unique medical condition.

In 1975, the United States National Institutes of Health (NIH) convened a conference to standardize the naming and recommended replacing the possessive form, "Down's syndrome", with "Down syndrome". However, both the possessive and nonpossessive forms remain in use by the general population, and in the United Kingdom the NHS uses the term Down's syndrome in its patient-oriented information. The term "trisomy 21" is also commonly used.

=== Ethics ===
Obstetricians routinely offer antenatal screenings for various conditions, including Down syndrome. When results from testing become available, it is considered an ethical requirement to share the results with the patient.

Some bioethicists deem it reasonable for parents to select a child who would have the highest well-being. One criticism of this reasoning is that it often values those with disabilities less. Some parents argue that Down syndrome should not be prevented or cured and that eliminating Down syndrome amounts to genocide. The disability rights movement does not have a position on screening, although some members consider testing and abortion discriminatory. Some in the United States who are anti-abortion support abortion if the fetus is disabled, while others do not. Of a group of 40 mothers in the United States who have had one child with Down syndrome, half agreed to screening in the next pregnancy.

Within the US, some Protestant denominations see abortion as acceptable when a fetus has Down syndrome while Orthodox Christianity and Roman Catholicism do not. Women may face disapproval whether they choose abortion or not. Some of those against screening refer to it as a form of eugenics.

=== Advocacy groups ===
Advocacy groups for individuals with Down syndrome began to be formed after the Second World War. These were organizations advocating for the inclusion of people with Down syndrome into the general school system and for a greater understanding of the condition among the general population, as well as groups providing support for families with children living with Down syndrome. Before this individuals with Down syndrome were often placed in mental hospitals or asylums. Organizations included the Royal Society for Handicapped Children and Adults founded in the UK in 1946 by Judy Fryd, Kobato Kai founded in Japan in 1964, the National Down Syndrome Congress founded in the United States in 1973 by Kathryn McGee and others, and the National Down Syndrome Society founded in 1979 in the United States. The first Roman Catholic order of nuns for women with Down Syndrome, Little Sisters Disciples of the Lamb, was founded in 1985 in France.

Down Syndrome International is the global network of people with Down syndrome and their families. In 2026, the Down Syndrome International Network had more than 150 organisation members working in 113 countries.

The first World Down Syndrome Day was held on 21 March 2006. The day and month were chosen to correspond with 21 and trisomy, respectively. It was recognized by the United Nations General Assembly in 2011.

Special21.org, founded in 2015, advocates the need for a specific classification category to enable Down syndrome swimmers the opportunity to qualify and compete at the Paralympic Games. The project began when International Down syndrome swimmer Filipe Santos broke the world record in the 50m butterfly event, but was unable to compete at the Paralympic Games.

=== Paralympic swimming ===
International Paralympic Committee Para swimming classification codes are based upon single impairment only, whereas Down syndrome individuals have both physical and intellectual impairments.

Although Down syndrome swimmers are able to compete in the Paralympic Swimming S14 intellectual impairment category (provided they score low in IQ tests), they are often outmatched by the superior physicality of their opponents.

At present there is no designated Paralympic category for swimmers with Down syndrome, meaning they have to compete as intellectually disadvantaged athletes. This disregards their physical disabilities.

A number of advocacy groups globally have been lobbying for the inclusion of a distinct classification category for Down syndrome swimmers within the IPC Classification Codes framework.

Despite ongoing advocacy, the issue remains unresolved, and swimmers with Down syndrome continue to face challenges in accessing appropriate classification pathways.

== Research ==
The additional copy of chromosome 21 affects the regulation of other genes, creating a complex set of changes. Mechanisms connecting the genetic defect to pathology remain unclear. While applying gene therapy seems like a promising approach, tailored treatments may be required. Gene therapy delivered via stem cells has been proposed as a tool for studying the syndrome and as an approach to therapy. Other methods being studied include the use of antioxidants, gamma secretase inhibition, adrenergic agonists, and memantine. Research is often carried out on an animal model, the Ts65Dn mouse. Some research seeks to develop appropriate screening tools to determine appropriate treatment strategies should they prove successful.

== Other hominids ==
Down syndrome may also occur in hominids other than humans. In great apes chromosome 22 corresponds to the human chromosome 21 (Note: Using the traditional numbering; the current numbering scheme retains human chromosome numbers, using 2A and 2B instead of 2 and 3 to refer to the two chromosomes that fused into chromosome 2 in humans.) and thus trisomy 22 causes Down syndrome in apes. The condition was observed in a common chimpanzee in 1969 and a Bornean orangutan in 1979, but neither lived very long. The common chimpanzee Kanako, born around 1993 in Japan, was genetically tested and found to have chimpanzee trisomy 22 in 2011. Kanako has some of the same symptoms that are common in human Down syndrome. It is unknown how common this condition is in chimps, but it is plausible it could be roughly as common as Down syndrome is in humans. Kanako was blind, relatively small, and targeted by aggressive group mates. Kanako died in the Kumamoto Sanctuary at Kyoto University in 2020.

Fossilized remains of a Neanderthal aged approximately 6 at death were described in 2024. The child, nicknamed Tina, suffered from a malformation of the inner ear that only occurs in people with Down syndrome, and would have caused hearing loss and disabling vertigo. The fact that a Neanderthal with such a condition survived to such an age was taken as evidence of compassion and extra-maternal care among Neanderthals.

== In popular culture ==
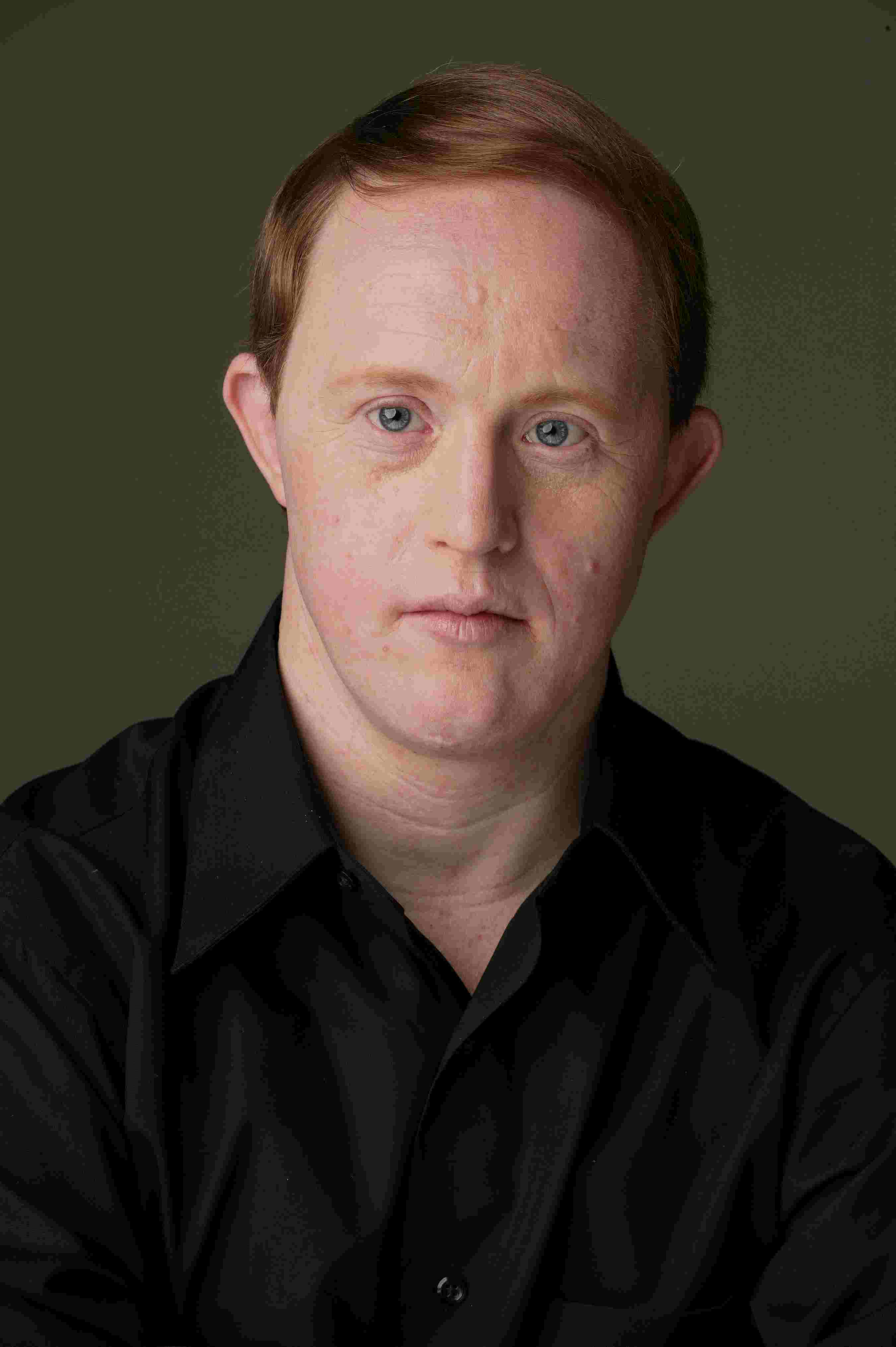
Chris Burke, an actor with Down syndrome, born in 1965

=== Individuals ===
- Ángela Bachiller became the first city councilor with Down syndrome in Spain for Pucela.
- Jamie Brewer is an American actress and model known for her roles in the television series American Horror Story. In Murder House, she portrayed Adelaide "Addie" Langdon; in Coven and Apocalypse, Nan; in Freak Show, Marjorie; and in Cult, Hedda. In 2015, Brewer became the first woman with Down syndrome to walk the red carpet at New York Fashion Week.
- Chris Burke (b. 1965) is an American actor known for starring on the television show Life Goes On, the first major series to feature an actor with Down syndrome in a major role, for which he was nominated for a Golden Globe Award.
- Mar Galcerán (b. 1977) is a Valencian Community legislator for the People’s Party. She is the first person with Down syndrome in Spain, and potentially all of Europe, to become a regional parliamentarian.
- Ellie Goldstein (b. 2001) is an English model and actress. She was the first model with Down syndrome on the cover of British Vogue. She starred in the television series Malory Towers, earning a Children's and Family Emmy Award nomination for her performance.
- Zack Gottsagen (b. 1985) is an American actor and rapper known for starring in the films The Peanut Butter Falcon and Night Always Comes.
- Tommy Jessop (b. 1985) is a British actor, author, and activist. He starred in the BAFTA-nominated Coming Down the Mountain and Line of Duty, and was the first person with Down syndrome to play Hamlet professionally, touring with Blue Apple Theatre. Jessop is a prominent campaigner in the UK and was a key figure in the creation of the Down Syndrome Act 2022. Jessop’s autobiography A Life Worth Living: Acting, Activism and Everything Else was published in 2023.
- Sofía Jirau (b. 1997) is a Puerto Rican model with Down syndrome, working with designers and media outlets such as Vogue Mexico, People, and Hola!. In 2020, Jirau made her debut at New York Fashion Week. In 2022, she became the first model with Down syndrome to be hired by Victoria's Secret. She walked the LA Fashion Week runway in 2022. Jirau launched an advocacy campaign in 2021 called Sin Límites or No Limits.
- Chris Nikic (b. 1999) is the first person with Down syndrome to finish an Ironman Triathlon. He was awarded the Jimmy V Award for Perseverance at the 2021 ESPY Awards. Nikic continues to run races around the world, using his platform to promote his 1% Better message and bring awareness to possibilities for people with Down syndrome.
- Lauren Potter (b. 1990) is an American actress known for her recurring role as Becky Jackson on the television show Glee. She won the SAG-AFTRA Howard Russell Award for disabled industry professionals who substantially contribute to disability awareness in media. President Obama appointed her to the President's Committee for People with Intellectual Disabilities.
- Grace Strobel (b. 1996) is an American model and the first person with Down syndrome to represent an American skin-care brand. She first joined Obagi in 2020. She walked the runway at New York Fashion Week 2020 and Atlantic City Fashion Week. Strobel has been featured in Forbes, on The Today Show, Good Morning America, by Rihanna's Fenty Beauty, and Lady Gaga's Kindness Channel.
- Madeline Stuart (b. 1996) is an Australian model referred to as the first professional adult model with Down syndrome. She made her runway debut in 2015 and launched a fashion line in 2017 at New York Fashion Week.
- Madison Tevlin (b. 2001) is a Canadian actress and comedian. She has been nominated for a Canadian Screen Award for her streaming talk show and appeared in films such as Champions.

=== Television and film ===
- Life Goes On is an American drama television series that aired on ABC from 12 September 1989, to 23 May 1993. The show centers on the Thatcher family living in suburban Chicago: Drew, his wife Libby, and their children Paige, Rebecca and Charles. Charles, called Corky on the show and portrayed by Chris Burke, was the first major character on a television series with Down syndrome. Burke's revolutionary role conveyed a realistic portrayal of people with Down syndrome and changed the way audiences viewed people with disabilities.
- Champions (2023) is a film starring four main actors with Down syndrome: Madison Tevlin, Kevin Iannucci, Matthew Von Der Ahe and James Day Keith. It is an American sports comedy film directed by Bobby Farrelly in his solo directorial debut, from a screenplay written by Mark Rizzo. The film stars Woody Harrelson as a temperamental minor-league basketball coach who after an arrest must coach a team of players with intellectual disabilities as community service; Kaitlin Olson, Ernie Hudson, and Cheech Marin also star.
- Born This Way is an American reality television series produced by Bunim/Murray Productions featuring seven adults with Down syndrome with work hard to achieve goals and overcome obstacles. The show received a Television Academy Honor in 2016.
- The Peanut Butter Falcon is a 2019 American comedy-drama film written and directed by Tyler Nilson and Michael Schwartz, in their directorial film debut, and starring Zack Gottsagen, Shia LaBeouf, Dakota Johnson and John Hawkes. The plot follows a young man with Down syndrome who escapes from an assisted living facility, in order to follow his dream of being a wrestler, and befriends a wayward fisherman on the run. As the two men form a rapid bond, a social worker attempts to track them.

=== Music ===
- The Devo song "Mongoloid” describes someone with Down syndrome using an offensive term for the condition.
- The Amateur Transplants song "Your Baby" is about a fetus with Down syndrome.

=== Toys ===
- In 2023, Mattel released a Barbie doll with characteristics of a person having Down syndrome as a way to promote diversity. A Black variant of the doll was released in 2024.

== See also ==
- Aneuploidy
- List of syndromes
- Characteristics of syndromic ASD conditions
