= MMIHS =

MMIHS may refer to:

- Megacystis-microcolon-intestinal hypoperistalsis syndrome or Berdon syndrome, a genetic disorder
- Manmohan Memorial Institute of Health Sciences, Kathmandu, Nepal
