= George Oliver (historian) =

English Roman Catholic priest and historian

George Oliver (1781–1861) was an English Roman Catholic priest, writer and a historian of Exeter, Devon, England, and its environs.

== Life ==
Oliver born at Newington, Surrey, on 9 February 1781 to a Scottish Presbyterian father, who died young, and an Irish Catholic mother. He was educated, first at Sedgley Park School, Staffordshire, and afterwards at Stonyhurst College. During the eleven years that he spent at Stonyhurst, Charles Plowden was his spiritual director, and took an interest in his literary studies. He was promoted to holy orders at Durham by bishop William Gibson, in May 1806.

In October 1807, he was sent to the mission of the Society of Jesus at St. Nicholas, Exeter, as successor to Thomas Lewis. This mission he served for forty-four years, retiring from active duty on 6 October 1851. He continued, however, to reside in the priory, and occupied the same room till the day of his death.

Oliver was one of the last Catholic priests, pupils of the English Jesuits, who did not enter the Society, but remained in the service of the English province, and subject to its superiors. On 30 March 1843 he was elected an honorary member of the Historical Society of Boston, US, and on 15 September 1844 he was created D.D. by Pope Gregory XVI. On the erection of the canonical chapters in 1852, after the restoration of the hierarchy by Pope Pius IX, Oliver was appointed provost of the chapter of Plymouth, a dignity he resigned in 1857. He died at St. Nicholas mission, Exeter, on 23 March 1861, and was buried on 2 April near the high altar in his chapel.

== Works ==
Oliver's works relate mainly to the county of Devon. They include:

- ‘Historic Collections relating to the Monasteries in Devon,’ Exeter, 1820.
- ‘The History of Exeter,’ Exeter, 1821, 8vo; 2nd edit. Exeter, 1861. An index to the second edition, privately printed in 1884, was compiled by J. S. Attwood.
- A translation of Father John Gerard's Latin 'Autobiography' from the manuscript at Stonyhurst College; printed in fourteen numbers of the Catholic Spectator, 1823–6.
- 'Ecclesiastical Antiquities of Devon, being Observations on many Churches in Devonshire, originally published in the "Exeter and Plymouth Gazette," with a Letter on the Preservation and Restoration of our Churches,' Exeter, 1828; written with the Rev. John Pike Jones of North Bovey, who contributed the introduction and the descriptions of twelve churches.
- 'Ecclesiastical Antiquities in Devon, being Observations on several Churches in Devonshire, with some Memoranda for the History of Cornwall,' 3 vols., Exeter, 1839–40–1842. A new work.
- 'Cliffordiana,' privately printed, Exeter [1828] Containing a detailed account of the Clifford family, three funeral addresses, and a list of the pictures at Ugbrooke Park. The author made collections for an enlarged edition, and wrote a series of thirteen articles on the 'Cliffords of Devonshire' that appeared in the 'Exeter Flying Post' between 1 June and 29 September 1857.
- 'Memoir of the Lord Treasurer Clifford,' London [1828?], reprinted from the Catholic Spectator; the article was subsequently rewritten, and appeared in the 'Exeter Flying Post,' 22 and 29 June 1857.
- 'Collections towards illustrating the Biography of the Scotch, English, and Irish Members of the Society of Jesus,' Exeter, 1838. A second edition, limited to 250 copies, London, 1845. These biographical notices appeared originally in the 'London and Dublin Weekly Orthodox Journal,' vols. ii.–iv. (1836–37).
- 'Merrye Englaunde; or the Goldene Daies of Goode Queene Besse' (anon.), London, 1841. This first appeared as a serial story in the 'Catholic Magazine,' vols. ii., iii. (1838–39). The plot is laid in Cornwall, and is based upon the adventures and persecutions of some catholic families in that county.
- 'Description of the Guildhall, Exeter,' in conjunction with Pitman Jones, Exeter, 1845; 2nd edit. 1853.
- 'A View of Devonshire in MDCXXX, with a Pedigree of most of its Gentry,' by Thomas Westcote, edited by Oliver in conjunction with Pitman Jones, Exeter, 1845.
- 'Monasticon Dioecesis Exoniensis, being a Collection of Records and Instruments Illustrating the Ancient Conventual, Collegiate, and Eleemosynary Foundations in the Counties of Cornwall and Devon, with Historical Notices, and a Supplement, comprising a list of the dedications of Churches in the Diocese, an amended edition of the Taxation of Pope Nicholas, and an Abstract of the Chantry Rolls,' Exeter: P. A. Hannaford, 1846. An ‘Additional Supplement … with a Map of the Diocese, Deaneries, and Sites of Religious Houses,’ appeared in 1854. These are additions to the edition of William Dugdale's 'Monasticon' by Sir Henry Ellis and Bulkeley Bandinel. An "Index nominum, locorum et rerum" by J. S. Attwood was published at Exeter in 1889.
- 'Collections illustrating the History of the Catholic Religion in the Counties of Cornwall, Devon, Dorset, Somerset, Wilts, and Gloucester. ... With notices of the Dominican, Benedictine, and Franciscan Orders in England,' London, 1857.
- 'Lives of the Bishops of Exeter, and a History of the Cathedral,' Exeter, 1861.
- Letters on ecclesiastical and parochial antiquities, family history, and biography, extending over a period of nine years, sent under the signature of 'Curiosus,' to local newspapers, and principally to the 'Exeter Flying Post.' These communications were collected and inserted in two folio volumes by Pitman Jones, who added notes. Winslow Jones, son of the latter, presented these volumes in 1877 to the library of the Devon and Exeter Institution. Forty-eight of the communications contain the memoirs of about seventy-five celebrated Exonians.

Oliver was a contributor to the English Catholic periodicals of his time, his articles relating generally to Catholic biography, history, or antiquities. He also had the principal share in preparing for publication the 'Liber Pontificalis' of Edmund Lacy, bishop of Exeter, which appeared in 1847, as edited by Robert Barnes.

A lithographed portrait of Oliver was published shortly after his death by George G. Palmer of Exeter. This was reproduced as a frontispiece to Thomas Nadauld Brushfield's 'Bibliography.'

His memorial plaque is established in Exeter, close to St Nicholas Priory where he was based.
