= Nadauld =

Nadauld is a surname and a given name. Notable people with the name include:

- Thomas Nadauld Brushfield (1828–1910), English alienist and antiquarian
- Eva Nadauld (1923–2010), aka Eve Young or Karen Chandler, American singer of popular music
- Margaret D. Nadauld (born 1944), general president of the Young Women organization of the LDS Church
- Stephen D. Nadauld (born 1942), American academic, president of Dixie State University
