= Blue Apple Theatre =

British theatre company

Coordinates: 51.0564°N 1.3441°W

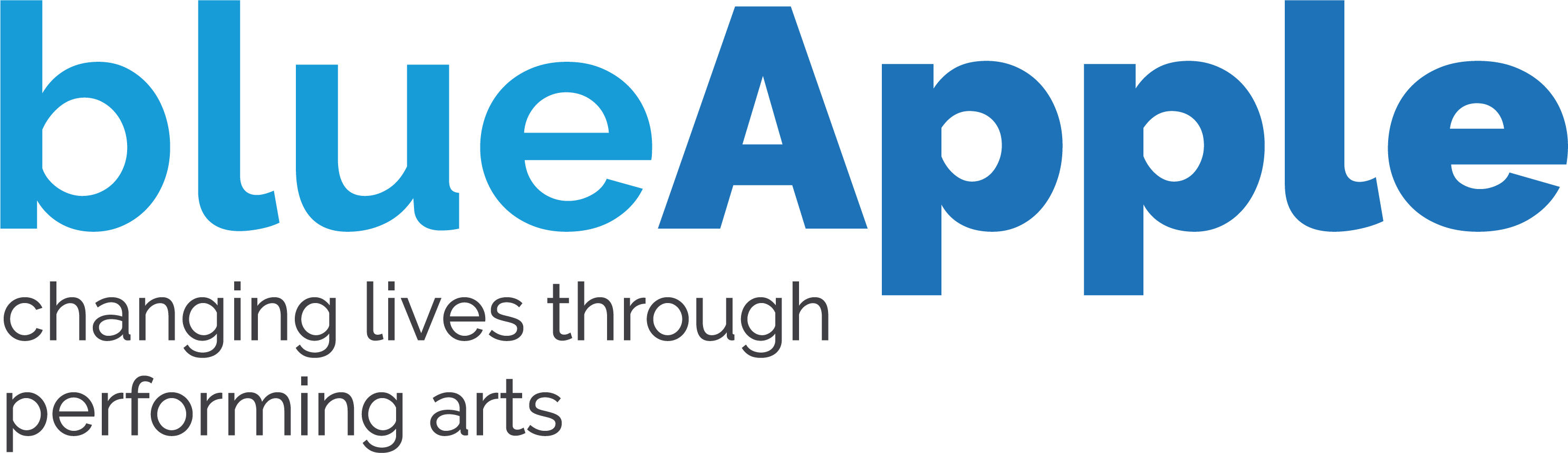
Blue Apple Theatre's logo

Blue Apple Theatre is a theatre company based in Winchester, England. It was founded in 2005 by Jane Jessop to support the inclusion of actors with intellectual disabilities on mainstream stages. In May 2012, six Blue Apple actors toured a re-imagining of William Shakespeare's Hamlet around the south of England. They were the first actors with Down syndrome to perform the play professionally. In 2016 members of the company, four with Down syndrome, performed scenes from Shakespeare on stage in the Sam Wanamaker Playhouse at the Globe Theatre in London.

In June 2012, Blue Apple Theatre was named as the 1000th winner of the Queen's Award for Voluntary Service in recognition of the efforts of its voluntary staff.

== History ==
Blue Apple was founded in 2005 by Jane Jessop to provide opportunities for people with a wide range of learning disabilities to participate in theatre and dance.

Jessop led the company for over ten years. Jane's final project was a tenth birthday performance event on stage at Shakespeare's Globe Theatre in London.

Blue Apple now delivers over 400 drama and dance workshops a year for over 100 members, in addition to two professional theatre shows and one touring production each year.

The company's first show was a basic Variety show called "Born to be Blue". This was followed by a costumed pantomime "Cinderella and the Wolf" written with the cast by the playwright and filmmaker Will Jessop. The company has created two full-scale productions a year ever since and launched a touring programme.

In 2008 the Apple Core auditioned theatre training group was established, Blue Apple launched its dance programme, made its first film and had a membership of around 50 people with learning disabilities. Blue Apple actors and dancers performed to a standing ovation in London, and in Brighton, Birmingham and around London.

In Autumn 2009, Blue Apple appointed their first arts consultant Peter Clerke, who in 2012 became the company's first Artistic Director. Clerke collaborated with Will Jessop as writer to create various productions including promenade performances of A Midsummer Night's Dream to mark Blue Apple's fifth anniversary in June 2010, an original play called "Captain Miserable and the Book Guardian" for Christmas 2010, a lively comic adaptation of Gogol's The Government Inspector for Summer 2011, a groundbreaking touring adaptation of Hamlet for 2012, an adaptation of Feydeau's Hotel du Paradis for full company performance in 2013 and adaptations of Much Ado About Nothing for both the touring and main company productions in 2014.

Volunteer support has been vital to the success of the company. The crucial support of nearly 200 volunteers who have supported Blue Apple since its foundation was recognised by the Queen when in 2012 Blue Apple became the 1,000th winner of the Queen's Award for volunteering.

== Apple Core ==
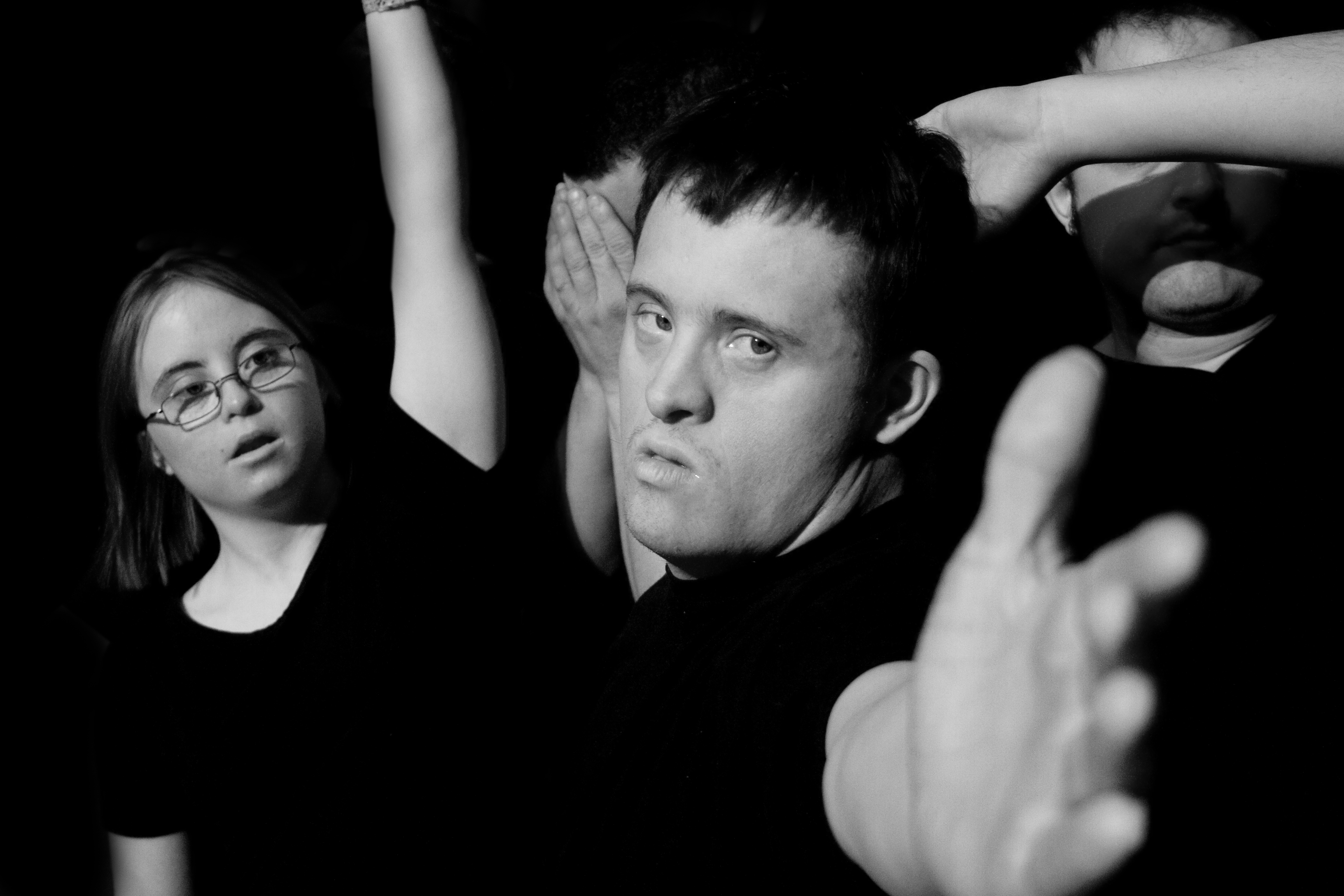
The Apple Core Actors

In 2008, Blue Apple Theatre introduced an intensive theatre training scheme for auditioned actors and dancers which has evolved into Blue Apple's touring company. The "Apple Core" began by creating various theatre and dance productions for performance at local and national events such as the Winchester Hat Fair, Mencap conferences, medical schools and universities and two of the actors performed scenes from Hamlet in the cabinet office as part of the Diamond Jubilee of Elizabeth II.

In Autumn 2011, the six Apple Core actors (four with Down syndrome) created the company's first major touring production, the hard-hitting "Living Without Fear", which addressed the difficult subject of disability hate crime as perpetrated towards people with learning disabilities. The play toured nationally and was performed to over 4,000 people including MPs and ministers in Parliament and over 600 school children and 800 police personnel. The Hampshire Chronicle described the play as "the most powerful production seen in Winchester for many years". "Living Without Fear" had its second tour in March and April 2013. In March 2012, Blue Apple Theatre received funding from the Home Office for the filmmaker Will Jessop to create a film adaptation of the play for and with Hampshire Constabulary.

In May 2012, the Apple Core actors created a new touring production of Hamlet and in 2014 toured Much Ado About Nothing to theatres across the south of England and at RADA.

== Hamlet ==
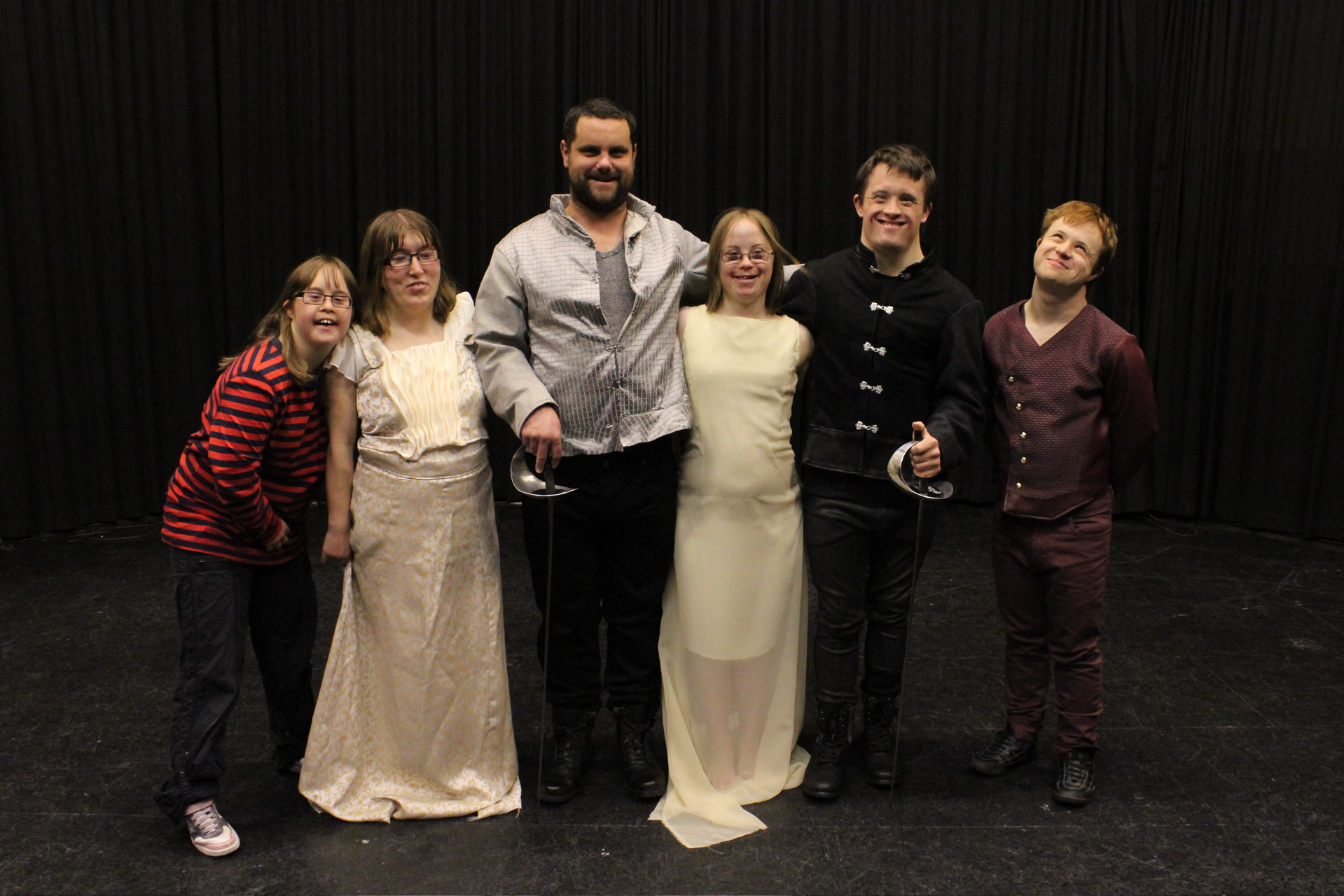
The Cast of Blue Apple's Hamlet Tour

In 2012, Blue Apple received Arts Council England funding for its Core actors to tour a production of Hamlet to theatres across the South of England, playing at illustrious venues like the Minack Theatre in Cornwall and the Rose Theatre, Kingston. The production received positive reviews in The Stage and the Hampshire Chronicle. Blue Apple's Hamlet was performed to over 3,500 people in all and scenes were performed by Tommy Jessop, and Lawrie Morris in the cabinet office in 2012 and by Tommy Jessop and Katy Francis on stage at Shakespeare's Globe Theatre's Sam Wanamaker Playhouse in 2016. The other actors were Anna Brisbane, Ros Davies, James Elsworthy, Katy Francis and Lawrie Morris.

At the end of June 2012, the Core actors returned to the main company for three performances of "Hamlet" at the Theatre Royal, Winchester.

The story of Blue Apple's Hamlet is the subject of Will Jessop's Emmy-nominated BBC3 feature documentary, "Growing Up Down's" The Times reviewed it as "a triumph for the cast, for BBC Three, and for everyone involved in this life-enhancing project." University of York academic, Dr Sarah Olive, argued that there was scope for the documentary to give greater opportunity for self-advocacy to the actors with learning disabilities featured.

== Other work ==
As well as producing plays, Blue Apple runs a dance programme and makes films.

"Perils of Penelope " is a short film made in 2008 by the whole company in the style of early silent movies.

"Freddie's Story" is a 40-minute training DVD starring Tommy Jessop, which tackles diagnostic overshadowing, gaining consent from someone with a learning disability, communication and care in hospital through dramatized scenes and face to face training by people who have learning disabilities and a hospital consultant. "Freddie's Story" is being used for training medical staff by the National Health Service in hospitals across Britain.

"Paul's story" is a short training film commissioned by the police and funded by the Home Office. "Paul's Story" stars James Elsworthy and tackles difficult issues around hate crime aimed at people with learning disabilities.
