= Berdon syndrome =

- Other names: Megacystis-microcolon-intestinal hypoperistalsis syndrome, MMIH syndrome, MMIHS
- Berdon syndrome has an autosomal recessive pattern of inheritance.
- Specialty: Medical genetics

Berdon syndrome, also called megacystis-microcolon-intestinal hypoperistalsis syndrome (MMIH syndrome), is a generally fatal autosomal recessive genetic disorder affecting the bladder, colon, and intestines.

It is more prevalent in females (7 females to 3 males) and is characterized by constipation and urinary retention, microcolon, giant bladder (megacystis), intestinal hypoperistalsis, hydronephrosis, and dilated small bowel. The pathological findings consist of an abundance of ganglion cells in both dilated and narrow areas of the intestine. It is a familial disturbance of unknown cause.

Walter Berdon et al. in 1976 first described the condition in five female infants, two of whom were sisters. All had marked dilatation of the bladder and some had hydronephrosis and the external appearance of prune belly. The infants also had microcolon and dilated small intestines.

== Genetics ==
Several genes are known to be implicated in this syndrome: these include ACTG2, LMOD1, MYH11 and MYLK.

== Diagnosis ==
Berdon syndrome is generally diagnosed after birth by the signs and symptoms as well as radiological and surgical findings. It can be diagnosed in the uterus by ultrasound, revealing the enlarged bladder and hydronephrosis.

== Treatment ==
Long-term survival with Berdon syndrome usually requires parenteral nutrition and urinary catheterisation or diversion. Most long-term survivors also have ileostomies. A multivisceral transplant (stomach, pancreas, small bowel, liver and large intestine) has also been successful. In a 2011 study of 227 children with the syndrome, "the oldest survivor [was] 24 years old."
