= Thomas Brushfield =

English psychiatrist

Thomas Brushfield (1858–1937) was an English psychiatrist who worked in the field of intellectual disability. He is remembered for describing Brushfield spots, and was the medical superintendent of the Fountain Hospital for Imbeciles, Tooting, from 1914 to 1927. He died on 17 May 1937, aged 79.

He was the son of Thomas Nadauld Brushfield (1828–1910), a noted authority in the same field and expert on the life of Sir Walter Raleigh.
