= Tommy Jessop =

British actor (born 1985)

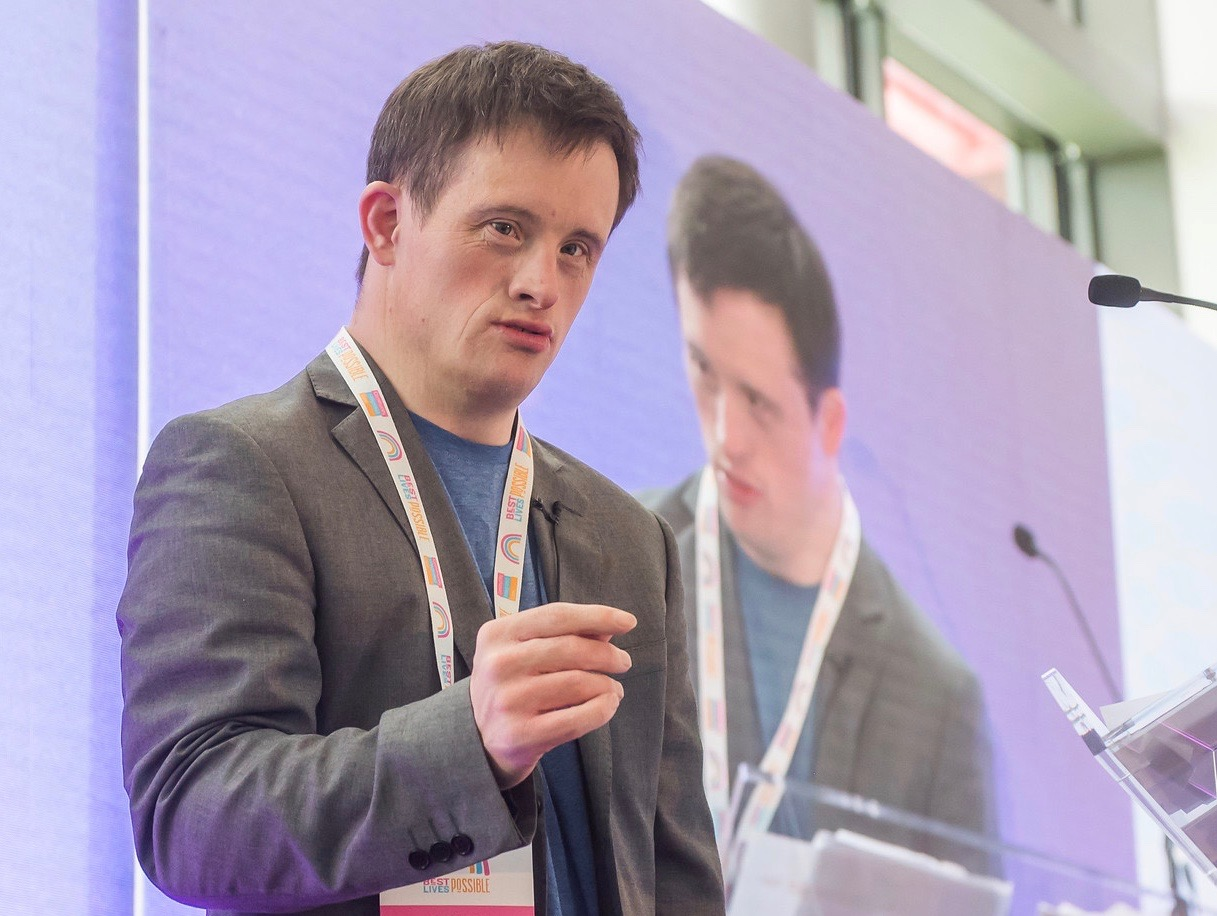
- Jessop giving a keynote speech in 2025
- Born: 19 January 1985 (age 41)
- Occupations: Actor, author, activist
- Years active: 2007–present
- Notable work: Line of Duty; Masters of the Air; Coming Down the Mountain; Hamlet
- Website: tommy-jessop.com

Thomas Jessop (born 19 January 1985) is a British actor, author and activist. He is the first actor with Down syndrome to star in a primetime BBC drama, the first professional actor with Down syndrome to tour theatres as Hamlet, and the first to become a full voting member of BAFTA. In 2021, he was awarded an Honorary Doctor of the Arts by the University of Winchester. He is also an ambassador for Mencap and a patron of the National Down syndrome Policy Group.

He has commented that disabled actors need opportunities to appear other than as victims or objects of pity.

== Career ==
=== Film ===
Jessop has a portfolio of short films to his name and cameo appearances in feature films including Day of the Flowers. His lead role in Fighter won him Best Actor at the Oska Bright Film Festival and Best Film at Film London, and was named Short of the Week at the BFI London Film Festival. He appeared in Down & Out and Innocence, the latter of which won the Don Quixote Award at Kraków Film Festival. Jessop also played a fisherman in Little Shit and a football fan in Delilah.

=== Television ===
Jessop's first breakthrough came in 2007 when he starred opposite Nicholas Hoult in the feature-length BBC drama Coming Down the Mountain. The writer Mark Haddon said Jessop was the inspiration behind the project. Jessop's performance was widely praised, and the film was nominated for a Television BAFTA for "Best Single Drama", before winning the RADAR People of the Year Human Rights Media Award 2008. Jessop made his television debut in Holby City, and has also appeared as guest lead in two episodes of Casualty, Monroe and Doctors. His dream is to appear on EastEnders.

In June 2015, he appeared in two "Blue Badge" specials of Off Their Rockers on ITV.

Jessop starred in BBC's Line of Duty, appearing as Terry Boyle in the fifth series in 2019, the second actor to play the role. He reprised his role as a returning character in three dramatic episodes in the sixth series of Line of Duty in 2021.

In 2024 Jessop played Tommy opposite Callum Turner and Austin Butler in the TV series Masters of the Air produced by Steven Spielberg and Tom Hanks for Apple TV+.

=== Theatre ===
Jessop is a founding member of award-winning integrated company Blue Apple Theatre, and has appeared in all their productions to date. In 2010, he played Bottom in A Midsummer Night's Dream. In 2011, he was the Mayor in Gogol's The Government Inspector. In May 2012, Jessop made history when he became the first professional actor with Down syndrome to play the title role of Hamlet in Blue Apple's touring production. This led to an invitation from Mark Rylance to take part in his What You Will Pop up Shakespeare and the Globe Theatre Sonnet Walks. In March and April 2013, Tommy played the role of Bobby, a victim of hate crime in Living Without Fear, Blue Apple Theatre's touring production about disability hate crime. Jessop has also performed the roles of Prospero in The Tempest and Don Pedro in Much Ado About Nothing, Marley's Ghost in A Christmas Carol, and The Creature in Frankenstein.

In 2018, Jessop performed the role of Vladimir in a Culture Device production of Waiting for Godot at Hackney Showroom. The Beckett scholar Dr Hannah Simpson described Jessop as delivering a "laconic and angrily pensive" performance that "by itself merited the standing ovation that the play received."

=== Documentary ===
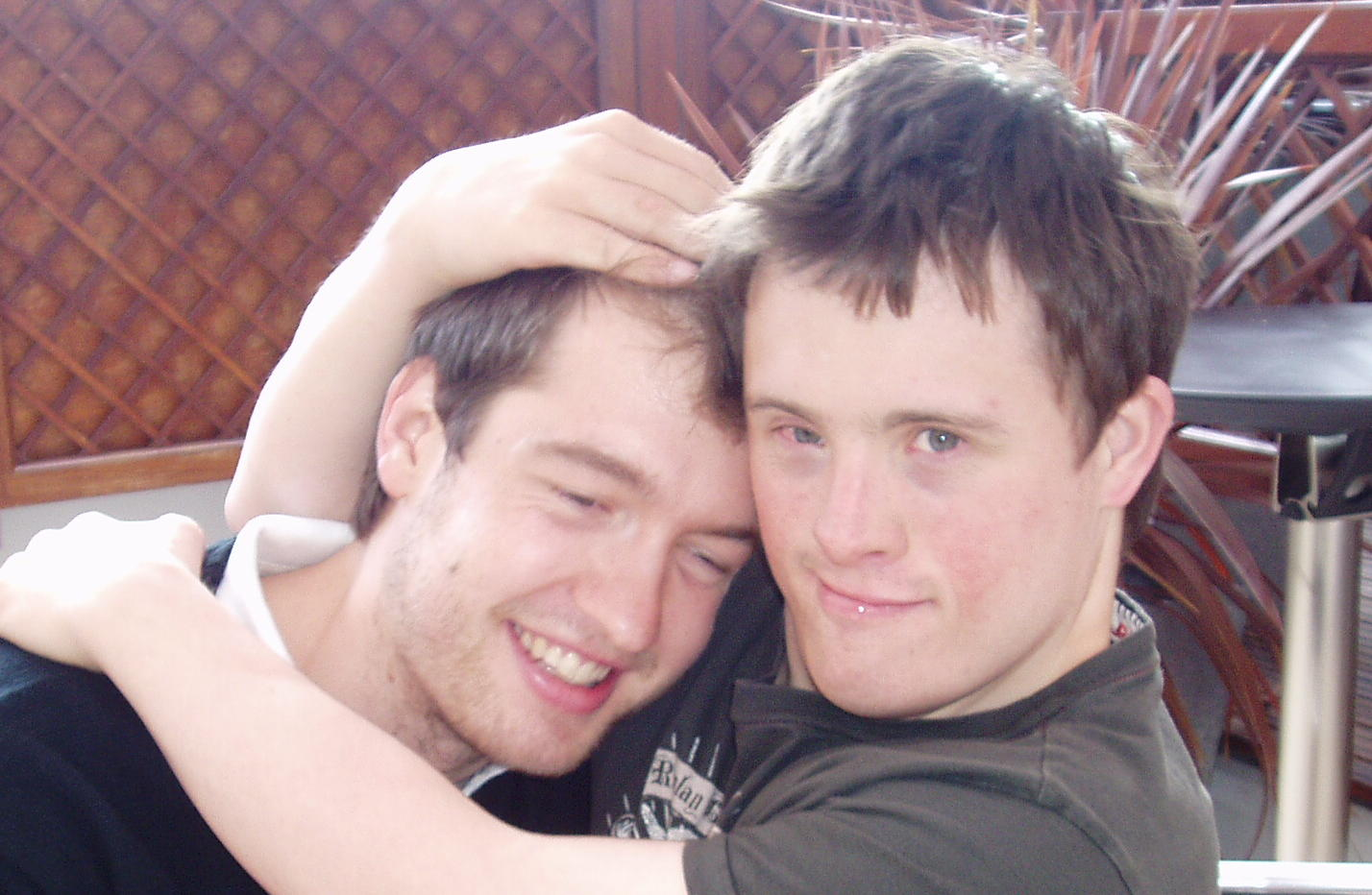
Tommy (right) with brother Will (left)

Jessop frequently collaborates with his brother, the writer and filmmaker Will Jessop. In 2007, the brothers made the broadcast documentary Tommy's Story for The Community Channel. Will filmed Tommy behind the scenes of Coming Down the Mountain and Holby City, and was shortlisted for Best Newcomer at the Grierson Awards 2008. In February 2014, Jessop was one of the stars of Growing Up Down's, a documentary about Blue Apple Theatre's touring production of Hamlet that Will produced and directed for BBC Three. The film was described as "BBC Three at its very best" and in November 2014 won the Creative Diversity Network Award for Most Groundbreaking Programme.

In 2023, the Jessop brothers made their third documentary together, Tommy Jessop Goes to Hollywood, in which Jessop sets out to create and pitch his own superhero movie in Hollywood. The film features appearances from Kit Harington, Will Sharpe and Neve Campbell and was broadcast on BBC One on 21 August 2023 to popular and critical acclaim, including a five star review from Carol Midgley in The Times.

In 2022, Jessop investigated why people with a learning disability are more than twice as likely to die from avoidable causes than the rest of the population as part of a BBC Panorama entitled Will the NHS Care for Me?

=== Books ===
On 6 July 2023, Headline Publishing Group published Jessop's memoir, titled A Life Worth Living: Acting, Activism and Everything Else.

On 8 May 2025, Ladybird Books published a children's book written by Jessop with illustrations by Carolina Rabei. The title is Tommy's Time to Shine.

=== Radio ===
Jessop has starred in various radio productions for the BBC, including an episode of the series Stone with Hugo Speer in 2010, and the one-off play The Climb opposite Warwick Davis in 2011. On 10 April 2013, Jessop appeared in an episode of The Archers, playing Callum Longfield.

=== Dance ===
Jessop is one of the principal dancers for Culture Device Dance Project, an experimental dance company for professional dancers with Down syndrome. In March 2019, Jessop performed "The Rite Re-envisioned" with Culture Device Dance Project and dancers of The Royal Ballet at the Royal Opera House. Culture Device performed the dance again for the film The Rite, which was nominated for the Fashion Film Awards.

=== Modelling ===
Jessop is one of the models in the ongoing Radical Beauty Project, which seeks to change the way we see people with Down Syndrome.

In 2021, Jessop and other models with Down Syndrome including Ellie Goldstein were photographed by Sophia Spring for the cover of The Guardian's Saturday Magazine.

In 2023, a portrait of Jessop by the photographer Peter Flude was a National Portrait Award winner.

== Honours ==
In July 2021, Jessop received an honorary Doctorate of Arts from the University of Winchester for his services to the entertainment industry.

In 2022, Jessop was voted onto the Shaw Trust Disability Power 100 list. Jessop was then congratulated for this achievement in an Early Day Motion in The House of Commons that cited his "important contributions to drama, theatre, and the arts" and "determination to encourage and inspire others living with disability to capitalise on their true potential".

== Activism ==
Jessop is an important campaigner for the rights of people with Down syndrome. He was the main spokesperson for the campaign that led to the creation of the Down Syndrome Act 2022. After years of delay, on 8th September 2026 Jessop led a group of campaigners to 10 Downing Street to deliver an open letter to Andy Burnham calling on the government to publish the statutory guidance needed to put the Down Syndrome Act 2022 into practice.

Jessop has spoken out about the Assisted Dying Bill, stating that "there need to be rules to keep us safe, but that has not happened” and insisting that people with Down’s syndrome should not be “collateral damage” from the bill. Jessop's words were quoted directly by Baroness Grey-Thompson during a debate in the House of Lords.
