= Coming Down the Mountain =

2007 British television film

- Written by: Mark Haddon
- Directed by: Julie Anne Robinson
- Starring: Nicholas Hoult; Tommy Jessop
- Country of origin: United Kingdom
- Original language: English

Production
- Running time: 90 mins
- Production company: Tiger Aspect Productions

Original release
- Network: BBC One
- Release: 2 September 2007

Coming Down the Mountain is a 2007 British television film which was shown on BBC One, written by Mark Haddon (author of The Curious Incident of the Dog in the Night-Time) and directed by Julie Anne Robinson. The television film was based on a radio play also written by Haddon.

== Plot ==
David and Ben Philips are teenage brothers who live in London. Ben has Down syndrome. David resents the protective attention his parents lavish on his younger brother and how much they rely on him to look after Ben. The family move from London to Derbyshire so that Ben can attend a special school, meaning David has to leave his friends and girlfriend, Gail, behind. Ben makes friends and finds a girl friend. David has difficulty fitting into his new school, suffering at the hands of bullies. David discovers that Gail has moved on from him only five weeks after their break up, which leads him to self-harm. David decides to kill his brother. He takes Ben hitchhiking without telling his parents, and they camp in Snowdonia. Climbing the mountain, David plans to murder Ben by pushing him off a high ridge. At the top, David changes his mind, but, following taunting by Ben, pushes him in a fit of rage. Ben survives the fall relatively uninjured, but goes to hospital. David kidnaps him from hospital, but Ben stands up to him. He becomes the stronger character and, after an evening talking round the camp fire, David sees the real Ben for the first time and the brothers become reconciled. They both stand up to their parents' excessive molly coddling, so that both parents finally see Ben as a young adult, and family-life thus becomes far more relaxed and good-humoured. Ben explains that he has a girlfriend and wants to work on a farm. David writes to Alice - a girl he met while at Snowdonia - and the two bond.

== Awards ==
Nominated for a BAFTA 2008 Winner of the RADAR People of the Year Human Rights Media AWARD 2008

== Radio ==
In 2004, Haddon's original radio broadcast won Bronze for The Drama Award in the Sony Radio Academy Awards.

== Cast ==
- Nicholas Hoult as David Philips
- Tommy Jessop as Ben Philips
- Emer Kenny as Gail
- Katie Griffiths as Alice
- Julia Ford as Shelia Philips
- Neil Dudgeon as John Philips
- Charlie Clapham as Greg
- Brendan Heaney as Gary Jeavons
- Josh Cohen as Rob
- Charlotte Grant as Abby
- Emon Hussain as Sunil
- Rajvinder Lali as Yasmin
- Joe Sproulle as Henry
- Jamie-Ray Hartshorne as Damon
- Lewis Snow as Kevin
- Samuel Gaukroger as Liam
- Christopher Hanvey as Tattoo Man
