= Will Jessop =

British filmmaker

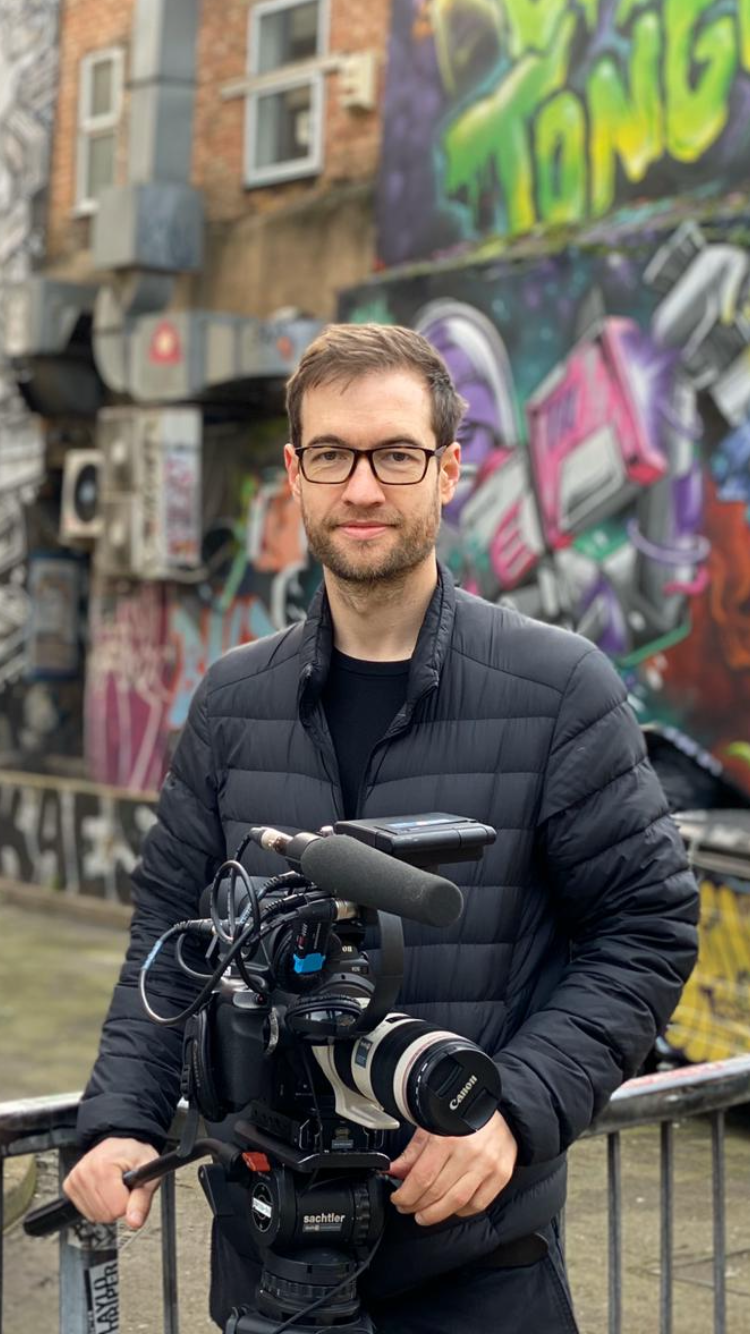
- Will Jessop in 2022
- Occupation: Filmmaker
- Years active: 2007–present
- Website: willjessop.com

Will Jessop is a British writer and director, and the brother of Tommy Jessop. He is an outspoken advocate for disabled talent.

== Career ==
=== Documentary ===
Jessop's first broadcast documentary was Growing up Down's (2014) for BBC Three, which tells the story of his brother Tommy and other actors from Blue Apple Theatre as they create a touring production of Hamlet. The documentary received positive reviews and was nominated for an International Emmy Award for Best Documentary.

In 2020, Jessop directed the BBC2 documentary 25 Siblings & Me, which follows a 21 year old British man called Oli Benjamin as he sets out to connect with his dibling family in the United States.

Jessop series directed the Channel 4 / Discovery+ series Investigating Diana: Death in Paris (2022), with unprecedented access to the officers of Operation Paget.

In 2023, Jessop reunited with his brother Tommy for the BBC1 documentary Tommy Jessop Goes to Hollywood, in which the brothers set out to challenge the negative typecasting of disabled talent by creating and pitching their own superhero movie: Roger the Superhero. The documentary features Kit Harington, Will Sharpe, Neve Campbell and Zack Gottsagen.

=== Theatre ===
Between 2010 and 2014, Jessop worked as a playwright with the learning disabled actors of Blue Apple Theatre to create adaptations and original productions including A Midsummer Night's Dream, Captain Miserable and the Book Guardian, Gogol's The Government Inspector, Hamlet, Feydeau's Hotel du Paradis, and Much Ado About Nothing.
