= Microgenia =

Abnormally small chin

Microgenia is the medical term for an unusually small or deformed chin.

The contrasting condition, an enlarged chin, is called "macrogenia".

There are seven different chin deformities:

- Class I: Macrogenia (chin excess)
- Class II: Microgenia (chin deficiency)
- Class III: Combined excesses and deficiencies
- Class IV: Asymmetric deformity
- Class V: Witch's chin
- Class VI: Pseudomacrogenia
- Class VII: Pseudoretrogenia

Class II microgenia is the most commonly encountered chin deformity, followed by class II macrogenia.

== Causes ==
Can occur in anyone, but is often a sign of Down syndrome.
