= Mar Galcerán =

Spanish politician (born 1977)

Member of the Corts Valencianes
- Incumbent
- Assumed office 14 September 2023
- Constituency: Valencia

Personal details
- Born: María del Mar Galcerán Gadea; 28 October 1977 (age 47); Valencia, Spain
- Political party: People's Party

María del Mar Galcerán Gadea (born 28 October 1977) is a Spanish politician who has been a member of the Corts Valencianes, the legislature of the Valencian Community, since 14 September 2023. A member of the People's Party (PP), Galcerán is the first Spanish regional legislator with Down syndrome.

== Early life and career ==
Born María del Mar Galcerán Gadea on 28 October 1977, Galcerán joined the conservative People's Party at the age of 18, citing its "embrace of tradition". She served as a civil servant for many years, (Note: La Vanguardia states Galcerán was a public servant for 26 years, while The Guardian states she was for 20 years.) including 13 as an intern with the President of the Valencian Government and four years with Asindown, a Valencian organization helping families with children with Down syndrome.

== Parliamentary career ==
In May 2023, Galcerán was placed 20th on the People's Party's party list for the 2023 Valencian regional election. She fell one seat short of becoming a member of the Corts Valencianes; however, due to the appointment of deputy Ernesto Fernández Pardo as the director general of the Entidad Valenciana de Vivienda y Suelo, Galcerán joined the Corts on 14 September 2023. She was the first person with Down syndrome to serve on a Spanish regional legislature, and, according to Down España, she may be the first person with Down syndrome to serve in a European regional parliament. As a member of the Corts, Galcerán hopes to help eliminate prejudice in society, saying "I want people to see me as a person, not just for my disability." Her appointment was celebrated by Carlos Mazón, the President of the Valencian Government, who described it as "great news for politics, overcoming barriers."
