= Madison Tevlin =

Canadian actress, comedian and broadcaster (born 2001)

Madison Tevlin (born December 6, 2001) is a Canadian actress, comedian, and broadcaster. She is most noted for her 2022 CBC Gem talk show Who Do You Think I Am?, for which she received a Canadian Screen Award nomination for Best Host in a Talk Show or Entertainment Series at the 11th Canadian Screen Awards in 2023, and as a star of the 2023 film Champions.

Tevlin, who has Down syndrome, first attracted widespread attention in 2015 when a video of her singing John Legend's "All of Me" went viral on the internet, even attracting attention from Legend himself. She subsequently had guest acting roles in the television series Mr. D and Lost & Found Music Studios.

She has stated that one of her key goals is to challenge misunderstandings, by presenting her own story as a person who still has passions, talents and goals to pursue, and is capable of much more than people typically expect of her based on her disability. In Who Do You Think I Am?, Tevlin interviews guests who have also experienced prejudice and misrepresentation around a variety of issues; guests on the show have included comedian Ann Pornel, singer Tyler Shaw, actor Lane Webber, drag performer Juice Boxx, and indigenous advocate Laura Vukson.

== Awards ==
In December 2024, Madison Tevlin was included on the BBC's 100 Women list.

== See also ==
- List of people with Down syndrome
