= Megacystis (fetal) =

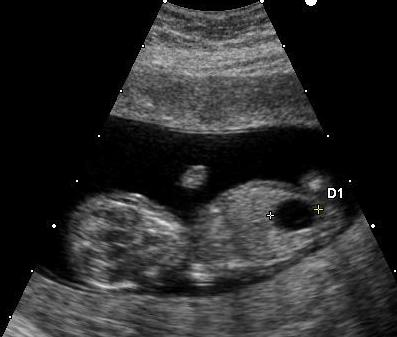
- Ultrasound of fetus with Down syndrome showing a large bladder
- Specialty: Urology

Fetal megacystis is a rare disease that is identified by an abnormally large or distended bladder.

== Cause ==
Megacystis may be associated with Berdon syndrome (MMIH syndrome).

== Diagnosis ==
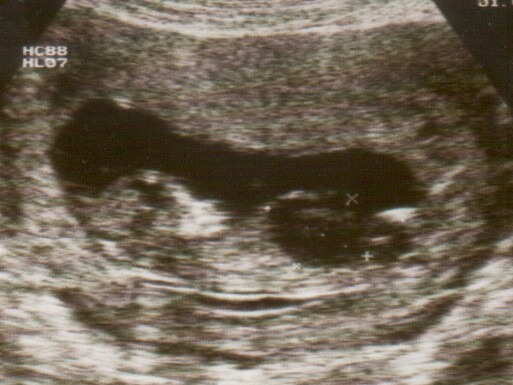
Ultrasound scan of a fetus with megacystis

Fetal megacystis is diagnosed during pregnancy by ultrasound imaging procedures. Since it can be associated with genetic abnormalities, further ultrasounds and tests may be administered during pregnancy. It may also be diagnosed as megalocystis, and/or termed megabladder, which is the same condition.

Megacystis is listed as a rare disease by the Office of Rare Diseases (ORD) of the National Institutes of Health (NIH), which means it affects fewer than 200,000 people within the U.S.

== Treatment ==
Megacystis can often be treated pharmacologically or with biofeedback to improve bladder functioning, if the child survives past early infancy.

== See also ==
- Berdon syndrome
