= Leiomodin 1 =

Protein found in humans

LMOD1

Identifiers
- Aliases: LMOD1, 1D, 64kD, D1, SM-LMOD, SMLMOD, leiomodin 1, MMIHS3
- External IDs: OMIM: 602715; MGI: 2135671; GeneCards: LMOD1
Available structures
PDB	Ortholog search: PDBe RCSB
PDB	List of PDB id codes 4Z79, 4Z8G, 4Z94

Gene location (Human)
Chr.	Chromosome 1 (human)
Band	1q32.1	Start	201,896,456 bp
Band	1q32.1	End	201,946,588 bp

Gene location (Mouse)
Chr.	Chromosome 1 (mouse)
Band	1|1 E4	Start	135,252,545 bp
Band	1|1 E4	End	135,295,803 bp
RNA expression pattern
Bgee	Human / Mouse (ortholog); Top expressed in: popliteal artery; tibial arteries; right coronary artery; gastric mucosa; Descending thoracic aorta; ascending aorta; saphenous vein; left coronary artery; muscle layer of sigmoid colon; body of uterus / Top expressed in: ascending aorta; tunica media of zone of aorta; aortic valve; interventricular septum; esophagus; urinary bladder; uterus; left colon; tunica adventitia of aorta; muscle of thigh; More reference expression data
BioGPS	n/a
Gene ontology
Molecular function	actin binding; tropomyosin binding
Cellular component	cytoskeleton; membrane; sarcomere; myofibril; cytoplasm; cytosol; actin filament; striated muscle thin filament
Biological process	pointed-end actin filament capping; actin nucleation; positive regulation of actin filament polymerization; muscle contraction; myofibril assembly
Sources:Amigo / QuickGO
Orthologs
Databases	NCBI: entry; OMA: entry
Species	Human	Mouse
Entrez	25802	93689
Ensembl	ENSG00000163431	ENSMUSG00000048096
UniProt	P29536	Q8BVA4
RefSeq (mRNA)	NM_012134	NM_053106
RefSeq (protein)	NP_036266	NP_444336
Location (UCSC)	Chr 1: 201.9 – 201.95 Mb	Chr 1: 135.25 – 135.3 Mb
PubMed search
- Wikidata
View/Edit Human	View/Edit Mouse

Leiomodin 1 is a protein that in humans is encoded by the LMOD1 gene.

== Function ==
The leiomodin 1 protein has a putative membrane-spanning region and 2 types of tandemly repeated blocks. The transcript is expressed in all tissues tested, with the highest levels in thyroid, eye muscle, skeletal muscle, and ovary. Increased expression of leiomodin 1 may be linked to Graves' disease and thyroid-associated ophthalmopathy. [provided by RefSeq, Jul 2008].
