= Sofía Jirau =

Puerto Rican fashion model with Down syndrome

- Born: Sofía Isabel Jirau González; March 26, 1997 (age 29); Puerto Rico
- Occupation: Model
- Website: web.archive.org/web/20240308044027/https://sofiajirau.com/

Sofía Isabel Jirau González (born March 26, 1997) is a Puerto Rican model.

== Personal life ==
Jirau was born in Puerto Rico to Frankie Jirau and Mimi González. She is the second eldest of four children. On April 29, 2020, on an Instagram Live, Jirau revealed she was in a relationship with Christopher González, a chef who owns a food truck. Both met at her job. According to her boyfriend, it was love at first sight. In an interview with People magazine, when asked who her fashion icon was, Jirau answered it was Jennifer Lopez. She also stated that she wanted to meet her.

== Career ==
Jirau made her modeling debut at a fashion show for designer Wanda Beauchamp at age 16. However, she officially started working as a model on March 26, 2019, her 23rd birthday. Since then, she has modeled for top designers. On February 10, 2020, the 24 year old Puerto Rican model made her debut at New York Fashion Week, becoming one of the few models with Down syndrome to participate in this event. Her debut was covered dozens of media outlets around the world, such as Vogue Mexico, People, ¡Hola!, among others.

Jirau became an entrepreneur in 2019 by launching an online store, which is named "Alavett", based on her favorite phrase "I love it", where she offers clothing, accessories, and home products. She also dreams of becoming an actress.

The model has made several partnerships with different brands, as well as upcoming modeling shows in Puerto Rico. She has also made appearances in videos telling her story, as well as awareness campaigns about Down Syndrome encouraging the community that there's no limits to accomplish one's dreams.

In February 2022, Jirau became the first-ever model with Down Syndrome to be hired by the American retail company Victoria's Secret. According to a press release, she, alongside 17 other women, promotes Victoria's Secret's new all-day comfort Love Cloud line, which the brand believes would "reinforce(e) Victoria's Secret's commitment to welcoming and celebrating all women." The announcement was covered by several news outlets in Puerto Rico and the U.S., as well as covered by magazines.

Currently, Jirau works as an Experience Ambassador in the Puerto Rican company INprende, which has served as Jirau's supporter in fulfilling her dreams.
