= Manmohan Memorial Institute of Health Sciences =

Medical college in Kathmandu, Nepal

- Established: 2006; 20 years ago
- Affiliations: Tribhuvan University, TEVT
- Chairman: Rajendra Prasad Pandey
- Location: Kathmandu, Nepal
- Website: www.mmihs.edu.np

Manmohan Memorial Institute of Health Science or MMIHS is a medical college in Kathmandu, Nepal. It is affiliated to Tribhuvan University and CTEVT.

== History ==
The institute was founded in 2006 by Nepal Health Care Co-operative Limited (NEHCO-Nepal). Other than MMIHS, NEHCO-Nepal manages a community hospital named Manmohan Memorial Community Hospital too.

== Programs ==
The institute offers the following education programs—

- Master of Clinical Bio Chemistry (M.Sc.Cl.Biochem)
- Master of Public Health (MPH)
- Bachelor in Public Health (BPH)
- Bachelor in Pharmacy (BPharm)
- Bachelor of Science in Nursing (B.Sc.Nsg.)
- Bachelor in Nursing Science (BNS)
- Certificate in Nursing (Staff nurse)
- Certificate in General Medicine (HA)
- Certificate in Health lab (Lab Technician)
- Diploma in Pharmacy (D.Pharm)
- Certificate in Radiography (PCL Radiography)
