= Champions (2023 film) =

2023 film directed by Bobby Farrelly

- Theatrical release poster
- Directed by: Bobby Farrelly
- Screenplay by: Mark Rizzo
- Based on: Campeones by: Javier Fesser; David Marqués
- Produced by: Paul Brooks; Scott Niemeyer; Jeremy Plager
- Starring: Woody Harrelson; Kaitlin Olson; Ernie Hudson; Cheech Marin
- Cinematography: C. Kim Miles
- Edited by: Julie Garcés
- Music by: Michael Franti
- Production company: Gold Circle Entertainment
- Distributed by: Focus Features (United States); Universal Pictures (International)
- Release dates: February 27, 2023 (Lincoln Square); March 10, 2023 (United States)
- Running time: 124 minutes
- Country: United States
- Language: English
- Box office: $21.9 million

Champions is a 2023 American sports comedy-drama film directed by Bobby Farrelly in his solo directorial debut, from a screenplay written by Mark Rizzo. It is an English-language remake of the 2018 Spanish film of the same name. Another more recent remake is The Champs (Italian title Campioni), an Italian production scheduled to be released on Netflix on December 15, 2026. The film stars Woody Harrelson as a temperamental minor-league basketball coach who, after an arrest, must coach a team of players with disabilities as community service. Kaitlin Olson, Ernie Hudson, and Cheech Marin also star.

Champions was released in the United States on March 10, 2023, by Focus Features. The film received mixed reviews from critics and grossed $21 million.

== Plot ==
Marcus Marakovich, a hot-headed assistant coach for a minor league basketball team in Iowa, gets fired after shoving the head coach and later crashing into a police car while drunk. Given the choice between jail or community service, he chooses to coach a team of players with learning disabilities, *The Friends*.

Initially resistant, Marcus begins to bond with the team and reconnects with Alex, the sister of one player, Johnny—who he previously had a fling with. As Marcus learns to care about the players and their lives, his attitude shifts. He tries to use the team’s success as a stepping stone to the NBA, but after a series of personal revelations and missteps—including hurting Johnny and being manipulative—he changes course.

In the face of funding issues and personal struggles, the team makes it to the Special Olympics finals. Though they lose, they consider themselves champions thanks to Marcus’s growth and their own perseverance.

Marcus declines an NBA offer, stays in town, and begins coaching at Drake University. He and Alex start dating, and Johnny moves in with friends. In a post-credit scene, Showtime finally lands his signature backward shot.

== Cast ==
- Woody Harrelson as Marcus Marakovich, a disgraced J-League basketball coach.
- Kaitlin Olson as Alex, Johnny's sister and Marcus's love interest
- Matt Cook as Sonny, an assistant coach
- Ernie Hudson as Phil Perretti, a fellow coach and Marcus' friend
- Cheech Marin as Julio, the manager of the rec center where the Friends practice.
- Mike Smith as Attorney McGurk
- Scott Van Pelt as himself
- Jalen Rose as himself
- Seán Cullen as Frank

=== The Friends ===
- Madison Tevlin as Cosentino
- Joshua Felder as Darius
- Kevin Iannucci as Johnny
- Ashton Gunning as Cody
- Matthew Von Der Ahe as Craig
- Tom Sinclair as Blair
- James Day Keith as Benny
- Alex Hintz as Arthur
- Casey Metcalfe as Marlon
- Bradley Edens as Showtime

== Production ==
Principal photography took place in Winnipeg and Selkirk, Manitoba, Canada, from November to December 2021, with some scenes being filmed in Albany, New York, United States. Extras were sought with a casting call through St. Amant, a non-profit organization that works with Manitobans who have developmental disabilities and autism.

== Release ==
Champions was originally scheduled to be theatrically released in the United States on March 24, 2023, by Focus Features, opposite Lionsgate's John Wick: Chapter 4. In January 2023, the release date was moved to March 10, 2023. The film had its red carpet premiere at the AMC Lincoln Square Theatre in New York on February 27, 2023.

The film was released digitally on March 28, followed by a Blu-ray and DVD release on May 2.

== Reception ==
=== Box office ===
Champions grossed $16.4 million in the United States and Canada, and $5.5 million in other territories, for a worldwide total of $21.9 million.

In the United States and Canada, Champions was released alongside Scream VI and 65, and was projected to gross around $5 million from 3,030 theatres in its opening weekend. The film made $1.8 million on its first day. It went on to debut to $5.2 million, finishing in seventh. It made $3 million in its second weekend, finishing in eighth.

=== Critical response ===
On the review aggregator website Rotten Tomatoes, 59% of 128 critics' reviews are positive, with an average rating of 5.8/10. The website's consensus reads: "Although its apparent attempts to be uplifting can often come across as patronizing, Champions is an amiable enough comedy with some seriously talented stars." Metacritic, which uses a weighted average, assigned the film a score of 50 out of 100, based on 34 critics, indicating "mixed or average" reviews. Audiences surveyed by CinemaScore gave the film an average grade of "A" on an A+ to F scale, while those at PostTrak gave it an overall 83% positive score, with 66% saying they would definitely recommend it.

== See also ==
- List of basketball films
