= Pseudostrabismus =

False appearance of crossed eyes

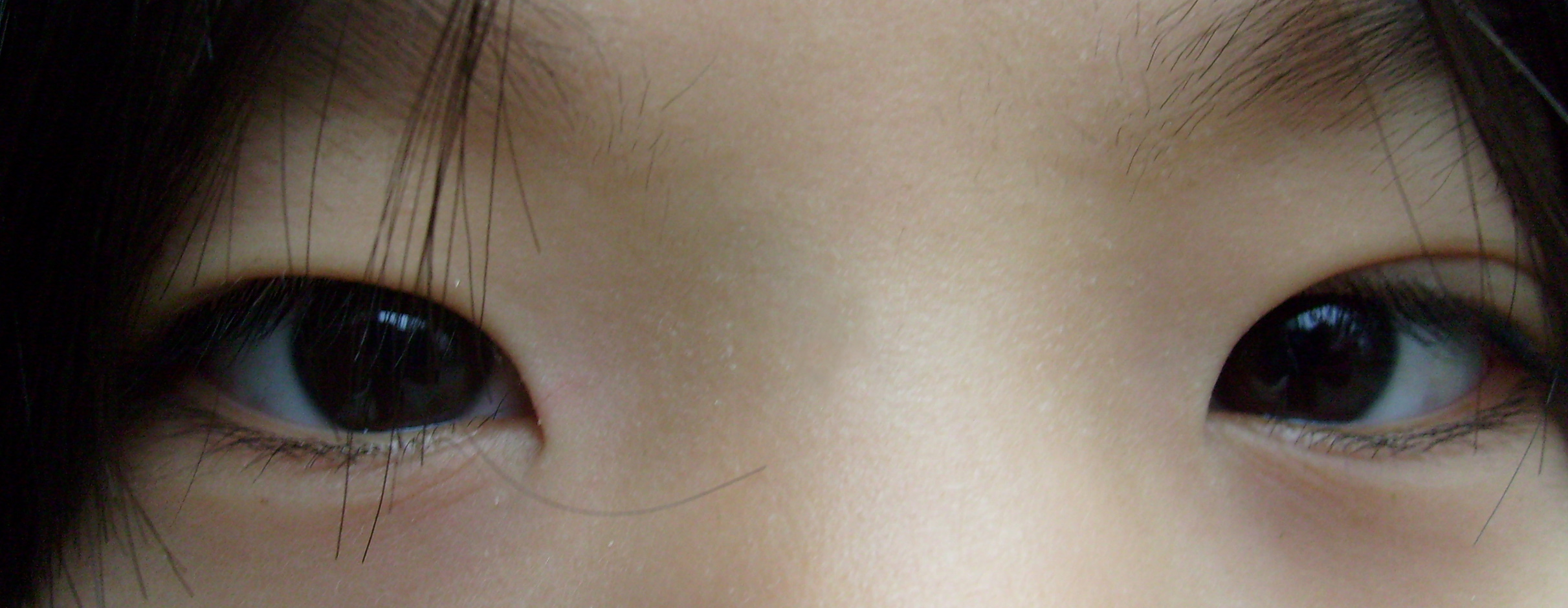
Pseudostrabismus in a Korean child

Pseudostrabismus is the false impression that the eyes are misaligned, which may lead to the incorrect diagnosis of strabismus.

Pseudostrabismus is more likely to be observed in East Asian or Native American infants, due to the presence of epicanthic folds obscuring the medial aspect of each eye.

Pseudostrabismus generally occurs in infants and toddlers, whose facial features are not fully developed. The bridge of their nose is wide and flat, creating telecanthus (increased distance between medial canthus of both eyes). With age, the bridge will narrow, and the epicanthic folds in the corner of the eyes will go away. This will cause the eyes to appear wider and thus not have the appearance of strabismus.

To detect the difference between strabismus and pseudostrabismus, clinicians use a flashlight to shine into the child's eyes. When the child is looking at the light, a reflection can be seen on the front surface of the pupil. If the eyes are aligned with one another, the reflection from the light will be in the same spot of each eye. If strabismus is present, the reflection from the light will not be in the same spot of each eye.

Rakel's Textbook of Family Medicine states, "A common misconception is that children with crossed eyes outgrow the condition, but this is generally not the case. This belief stems from the confusion between true strabismus and pseudostrabismus. When a child's eyes are truly crossed, it is always a serious condition and requires the care of an ophthalmologist.There is no treatment required if the child is having pseudostrabismus as the eyes are properly aligned."
