= Thomas Nadauld Brushfield =

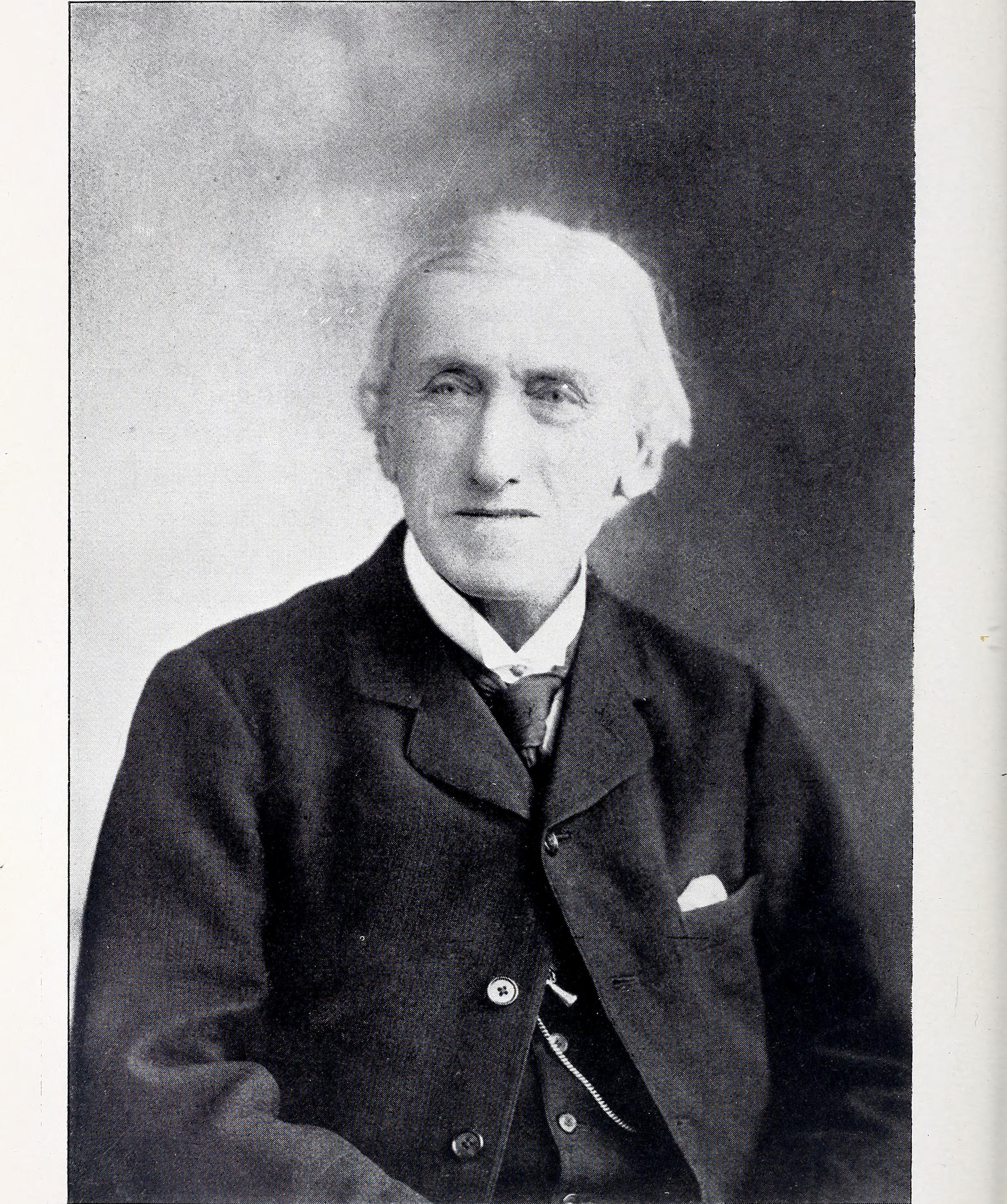
Thomas Nadauld Brushfield

Thomas Nadauld Brushfield (1828–1910) was an English alienist and antiquarian.

== Life ==
Born in London on 10 December 1828, he was son of Thomas Brushfield, J.P. and D.L. of the Tower of London, by his wife Susannah Shepley; his grandfather George Brushfield married Ann Nadauld, great-granddaughter of Henri Nadauld, a Huguenot sculptor. He was educated at a private boarding school at Buckhurst Hill in Essex, and matriculated with honours at London University in 1848.

Brushfield studied medicine and surgery at London Hospital, which he entered in 1845, and won three gold medals besides other honours. He became member of the Royal College of Surgeons in 1850 and graduated M.D. at St Andrews University in 1862. After serving as house surgeon at the London Hospital he joined Dr. John Millar at Bethnal House Asylum, London.

In 1852 Brushfield was appointed house surgeon to Chester County Lunatic Asylum, and was first resident medical superintendent from 1854 until 1865. In 1865 he was appointed medical superintendent of the then planned Surrey County Asylum at Brookwood. The buildings there were planned in accordance with his suggestions, and later on he helped to design the Cottage Hospital there. Brushfield was a pioneer of the non-restraint treatment of lunatics, and he sought to lighten the patients' life in asylums by making the wards cheerful and by organising entertainments. He retired on a pension in 1882.

On his retirement Brushfield settled at Budleigh Salterton, living in a Georgian house known as The Cliff, Cliff Road in Budleigh Salterton on the east Devon coast, near Hayes Barton, the birthplace of Sir Walter Ralegh. Brushfield made the career of Ralegh his main study for the rest of his life. He became a member of the Devonshire Association in 1882, was elected to the council in 1883, and was president in 1893–4.

Brushfield was a freemason, was elected fellow of the Society of Antiquaries of London in 1899 and was a founder of the Devon and Cornwall Record Society. He was a popular lecturer in the West Country. He died at Budleigh Salterton on 28 November 1910, and was buried there.

== Legacy ==
Brushfield's lantern slides went to the Exeter Public Library, with some of the major Ralegh items from his library. The rest of his library of about 10,000 volumes and manuscripts was dispersed after his death. As reader for the New English Dictionary, he contributed over 72,000 slips.

== Works ==
Brushfield's contribution to the literature of lunacy included Medical Certificates of Insanity (The Lancet, 1880) and Practical Hints on the Symptoms, Treatment and Medico-Legal Aspects of Insanity, read before the Chester Medical Society in 1890. A paper, 'Notes on the Ralegh Family,' which he read before the 1883 meeting of the Devonshire Association, began a series of papers Raleghana, research into Walter Ralegh's life and literary work, which were published in the Association's Transactions between 1896 and 1907. Ralegh Miscellanea (pts. i. and ii.) followed in 1909–10. He contributed other papers on similar themes to other journals. A bibliography of Ralegh, which was published in book form in 1886 (2nd edition 1908), first appeared serially in the Western Antiquary, vol. 5, 1885–6.

== Family ==
Brushfield married, on 5 August 1852, Hannah, daughter of John Davis of London, who survived him with three sons and three daughters. One of his sons was Thomas Brushfield (1858–1937).

== Notes ==
Attribution

This article incorporates text from a publication now in the public domain: Lee, Sidney, ed. (1912). "Brushfield, Thomas Nadauld". Dictionary of National Biography (2nd supplement). Vol. 1. London: Smith, Elder & Co.
