= List of people with Down syndrome =

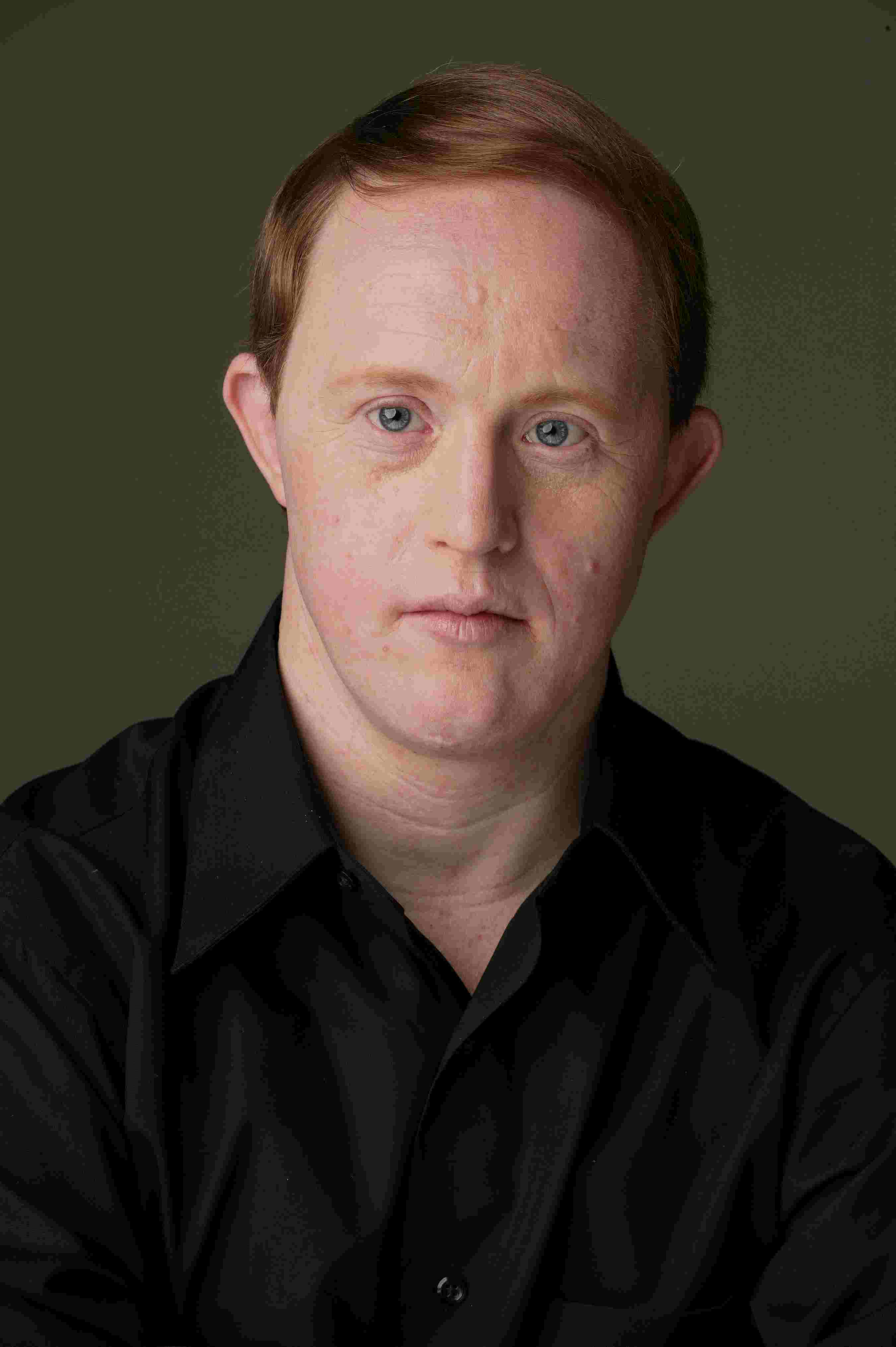
American actor and singer Chris Burke

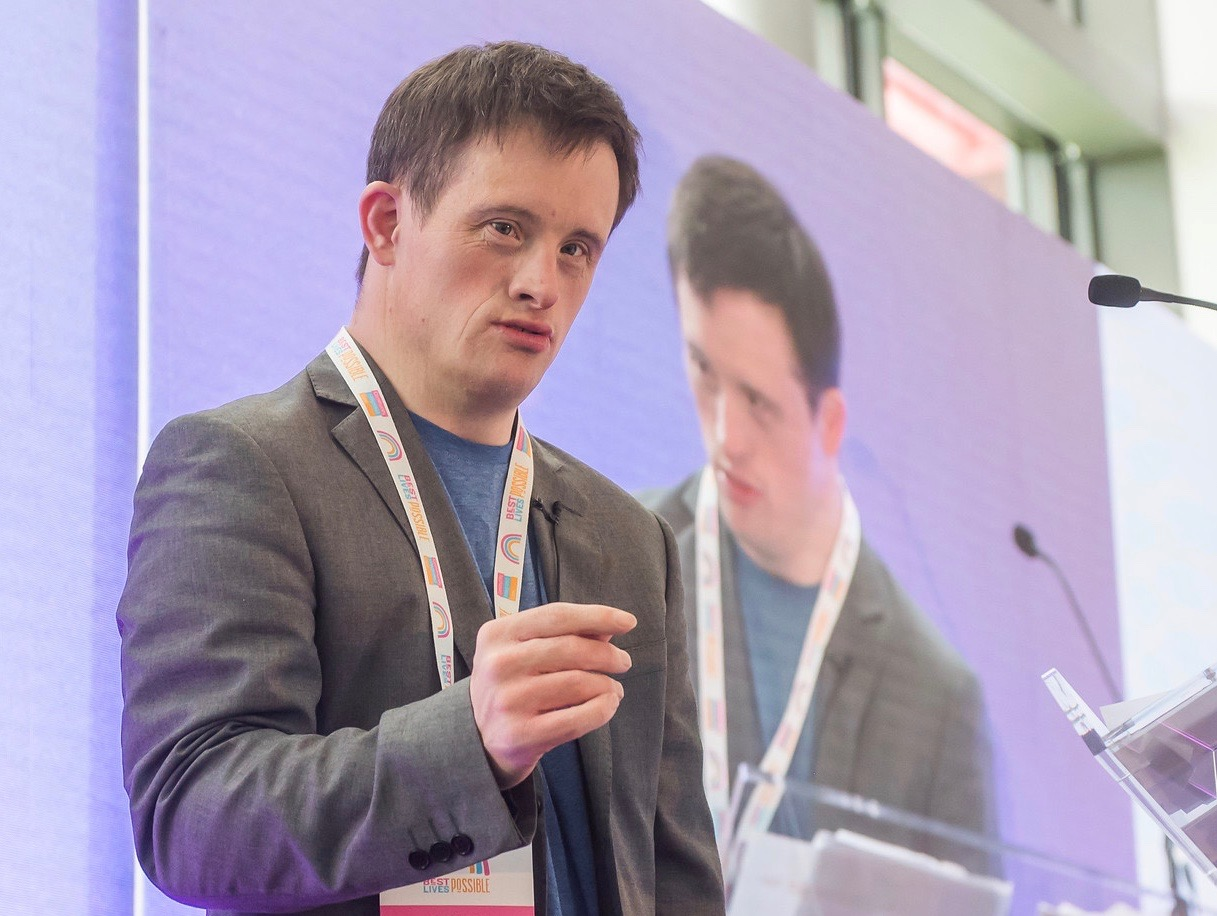
British actor Tommy Jessop giving a keynote speech

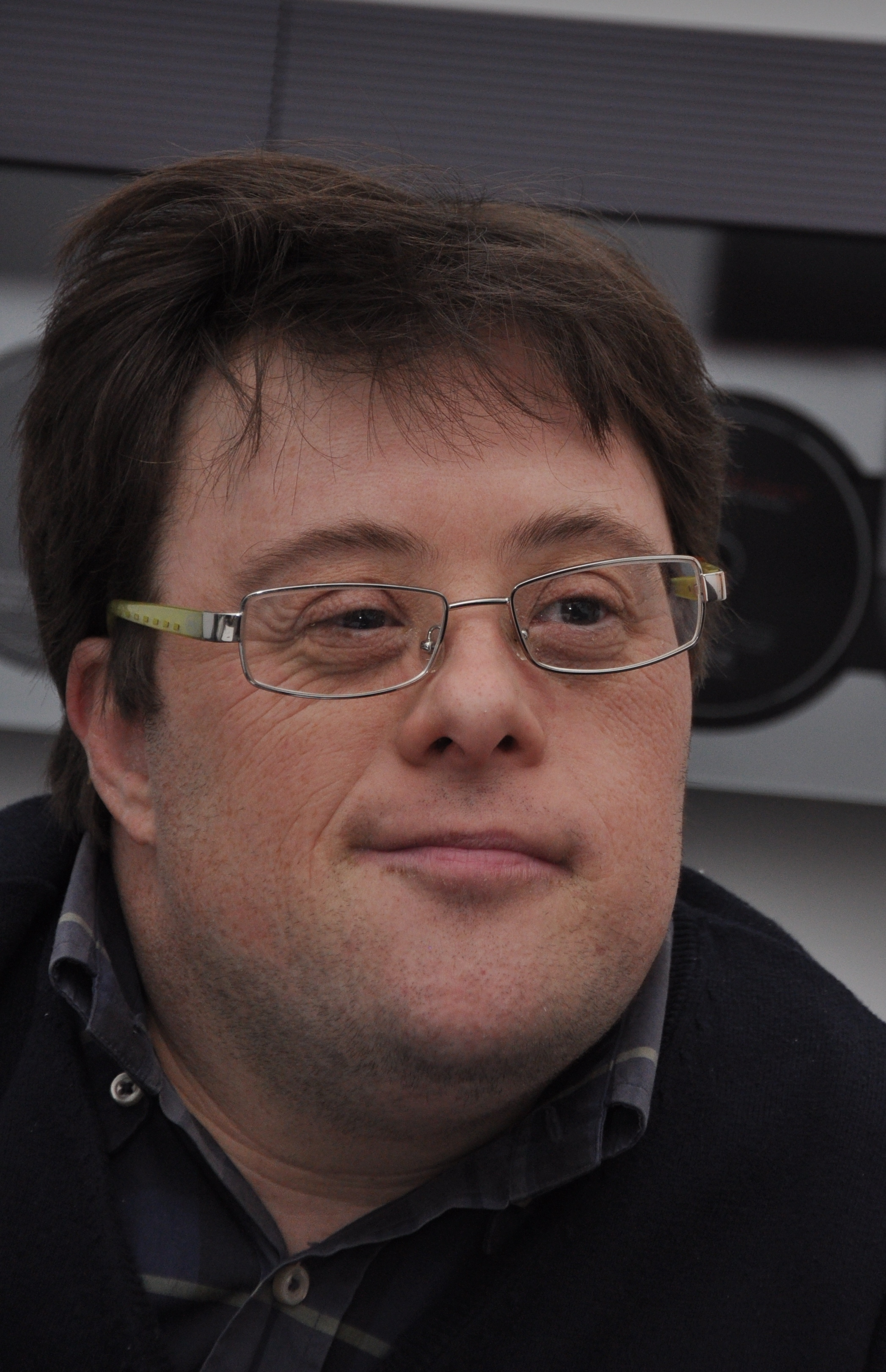
Spanish actor Pablo Pineda, the first European with Down syndrome to complete a university degree

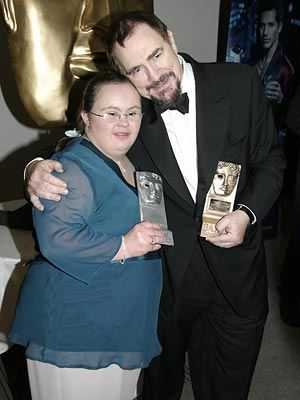
British actress Paula Sage receiving her BAFTA award with Brian Cox

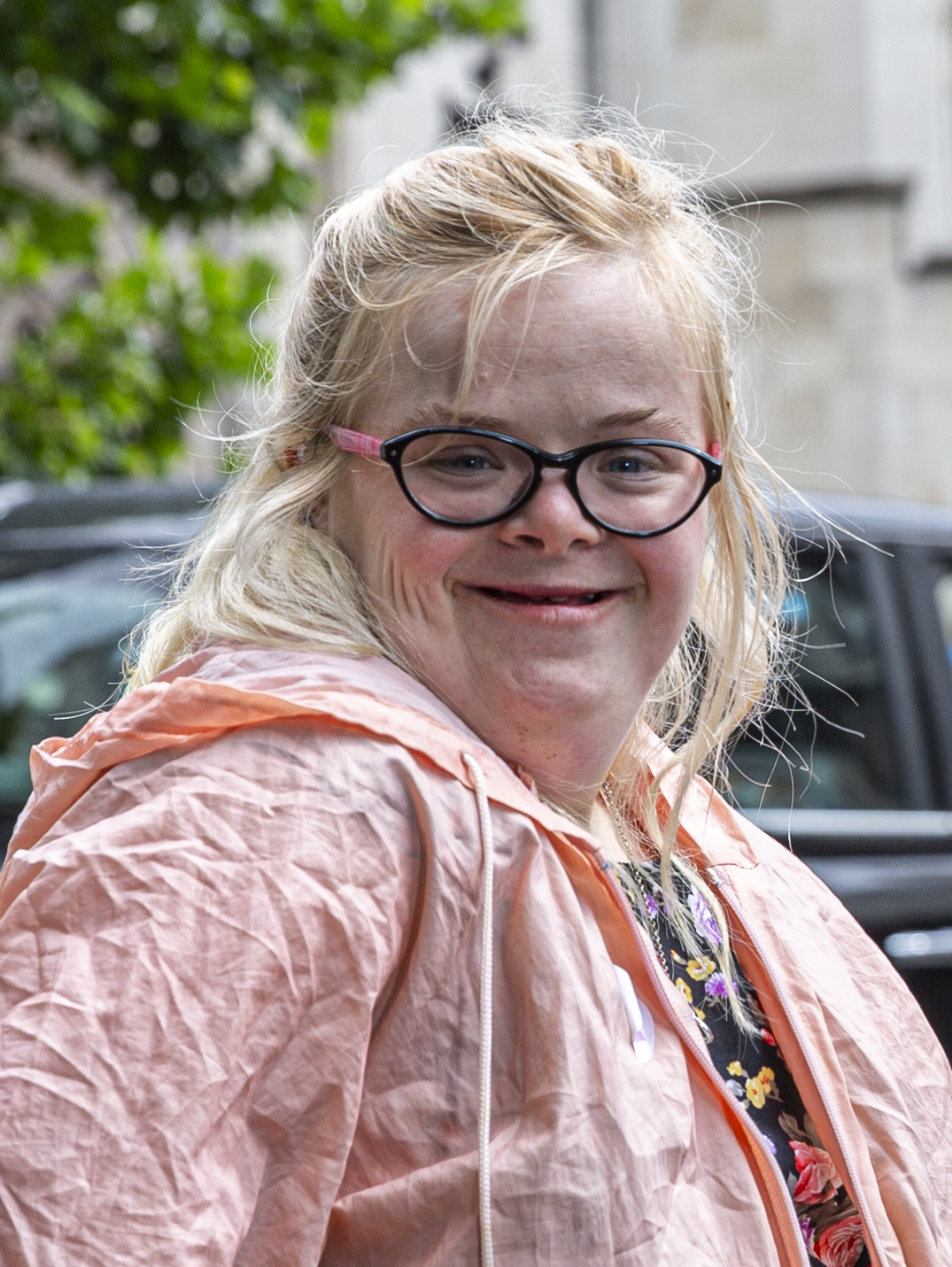
English disability rights activist Heidi Crowter

This is a list of notable people with Down syndrome, a condition also known as Down's syndrome or trisomy 21. Down syndrome is a genetic disorder caused by the presence of all or part of a third copy of chromosome 21. It is typically associated with developmental delays, characteristic physical features, and mild to moderate intellectual disability. The average IQ of a young adult with Down syndrome is 50, equivalent to the mental age of an 8- or 9-year-old child, but this number varies widely. At the same time, they enjoy a rich social and emotional awareness. Down syndrome is the most common chromosome abnormality in humans, occurring in about one per 1000 babies born each year.

== A–Z ==
Name	Details	Lifespan	Country	Source
Alexandrine of Prussia	German royalty	1915–1980	Germany	
Ángela Bachiller	Spain's first city councillor with Down syndrome	b. 1983	Spain	
Edward Barbanell	Actor who starred in The Ringer	b. 1977	United States	
Sam Barnard	Actor and reality star who appeared on The Suspicions of Mr Whicher and The Undateables	b. 1985	United Kingdom	
Jay Beatty	Celtic F.C. fan	b. 2003	United Kingdom	
Jamie Brewer	Actress who appeared in American Horror Story: Murder House and American Horror Story: Coven	b. 1985	United States	
Chris Burke	Actor and folk singer, best known for his role in Life Goes On as character Charles "Corky" Thacher	b. 1965	United States	
Claude of France	Queen consort of the Kingdom of France; diagnosis is speculative.	1499–1524	France	
Caden Cox	First college football player with Down syndrome to play and score in an official game	b. 1999	United States	
Heidi Crowter	Disability rights advocate	b. 1995	United Kingdom	
Sujeet Desai	Multi-instrumentalist who has performed in over 13 countries and almost all states, first person with Down syndrome to play in Carnegie Hall.	b. circa 1983	United States	
Collette Divitto	Entrepreneur who started Collettey's Cookies	b. 1990	United States	
Pascal Duquenne	Actor who won the Best Actor Award at the 1996 Cannes Film Festival for his role in The Eighth Day	b. 1970	Belgium	
Andrea Fay Friedman	Actress who appeared in Life Goes On and the Family Guy episode "Extra Large Medium"	1970–2023	United States	
Karen Gaffney	Disability rights campaigner and the first living person with Down syndrome to receive an honorary doctorate degree	b. 1977	United States	
Mar Galcerán	Member of the Corts Valencianes	b. 1978 or 1979	Spain	
Anne de Gaulle	Youngest child of Charles and Yvonne de Gaulle	1928–1948	France	
Marin Gerrier	Actor who was nominated for a Genie Award for his role in Café de Flore	Unknown	France	
Auðunn Gestsson	Newspaper salesman, poet and painter	1938-2020	Iceland	
Marte Wexelsen Goksøyr	Actress, playwright, writer and disability rights activist	b. 1982	Norway	
Ellie Goldstein	Model who has appeared on the cover of British Vogue	b. 2001	United Kingdom	
Sarah Gordy	Actress who has appeared in Upstairs Downstairs and Call the Midwife	b. 1976	United Kingdom	
Zack Gottsagen	Actor with the leading role in Peanut Butter Falcon and first presenter in the history of the Academy Awards with Down syndrome	b. 1985	United States	
Sandra Jensen	The first person with Down syndrome to receive a heart–lung transplant	d. 1997	United States	
Tommy Jessop	Actor, author and activist who starred in Line of Duty and Coming Down the Mountain and played Hamlet with Blue Apple Theatre	b. 1985	United Kingdom	
Jason Kingsley	Actor who appeared in 55 episodes of Sesame Street	b. 1974	United States	
Salman Kuttikode	Actor who starred in Pradhama Drishtiya Kuttakkar	b. 1987	India	
Éléonore Laloux	Disability rights activist, France's first municipal councillor and recipient of the Ordre national du Mérite	b. 1985	France	
Moncho Loubriel	Water boy, supporter and mascot of Vaqueros de Bayamón and Puerto Rico men's national basketball team	b. 1970	Puerto Rico	
Laz-D	Rapper	b. 1982	United States	
Joey Moss	Edmonton Oilers locker room attendant	1963–2020	Canada	
Chris Nikic	First person with Down syndrome to complete an Ironman triathlon	b. 1999	United States	
Pablo Pineda	Actor who starred in the film Yo También. First student with Down syndrome in Europe to obtain a degree.	b. 1974	Spain	
Lauren Potter	Actress who played Becky Jackson in Glee	b. 1990	United States	
Gloria Ramos	Actress who starred in Champions, first intellectually disabled Goya Awards nominee	b. 1993	Spain	
Ruben Reuter	English actor and journalist, best known for his role as Finn McLaine in The Dumping Ground	b. 2000	United Kingdom	
Paula Sage	BAFTA Scotland award–winning actress who appeared in AfterLife	b. c. 1980	United Kingdom	
Sofia Sanchez	Actress, appeared in 2023 The Hunger Games: The Ballad of Songbirds & Snakes	b. c. 2009	Ukraine; United States	
Robbie Savage	Football fan and socialite. Official mascot of the Brave Warriors, Namibia's national football team	1967–2017	Namibia	
Jiří Šedý	Artist, writer, and social activist	b. 1976	Czech Republic	
Judith Scott	Outsider sculptor and fiber artist	1943–2005	United States	
Sanna Sepponen	Actress known for her role in Salatut elämät	b. 1977	Finland	
Isabella Springmuhl Tejada	First fashion designer with Down syndrome to be featured in London Fashion Week	b. 1997	Guatemala	
Frank Stephens	Disability advocate who testified before US Congress in 2017 to explain that he regarded the abortion of fetuses with Down syndrome as immoral.	b. 1982	United States	
Grace Strobel	Model, Brand Representative First professional model with Down syndrome to represent an international skincare line.	b. 1996	United States	
Madeline Stuart	Model who walked at New York Fashion Week, hailed as the first professional model with Down syndrome	b. 1996	Australia	
Madison Tevlin	Actress, talk show host	Unknown	Canada	
Tim	An infant who was born after an unsuccessful abortion attempt and subsequently fostered	1997–2019	Germany	
Ali Topaloğlu	World and European champion track and field athlete	b. 1998	Turkey	
Eric Torell	Man who was shot 25 times by Swedish police	1997-2018	Sweden	
Charlotte Woodward	American sociologist and heart transplant recipient, known for disability rights activism	b. 1989 or 1990	United States	
Luke Zimmerman	Actor who starred in The Secret Life of the American Teenager	b. 1979	United States	

== Fictional ==
- C.J. Casagrande, 13-year-old boy in cartoon series The Casagrandes.
