= Hendrik Vermeulen =

South African Couturier and fashion designer

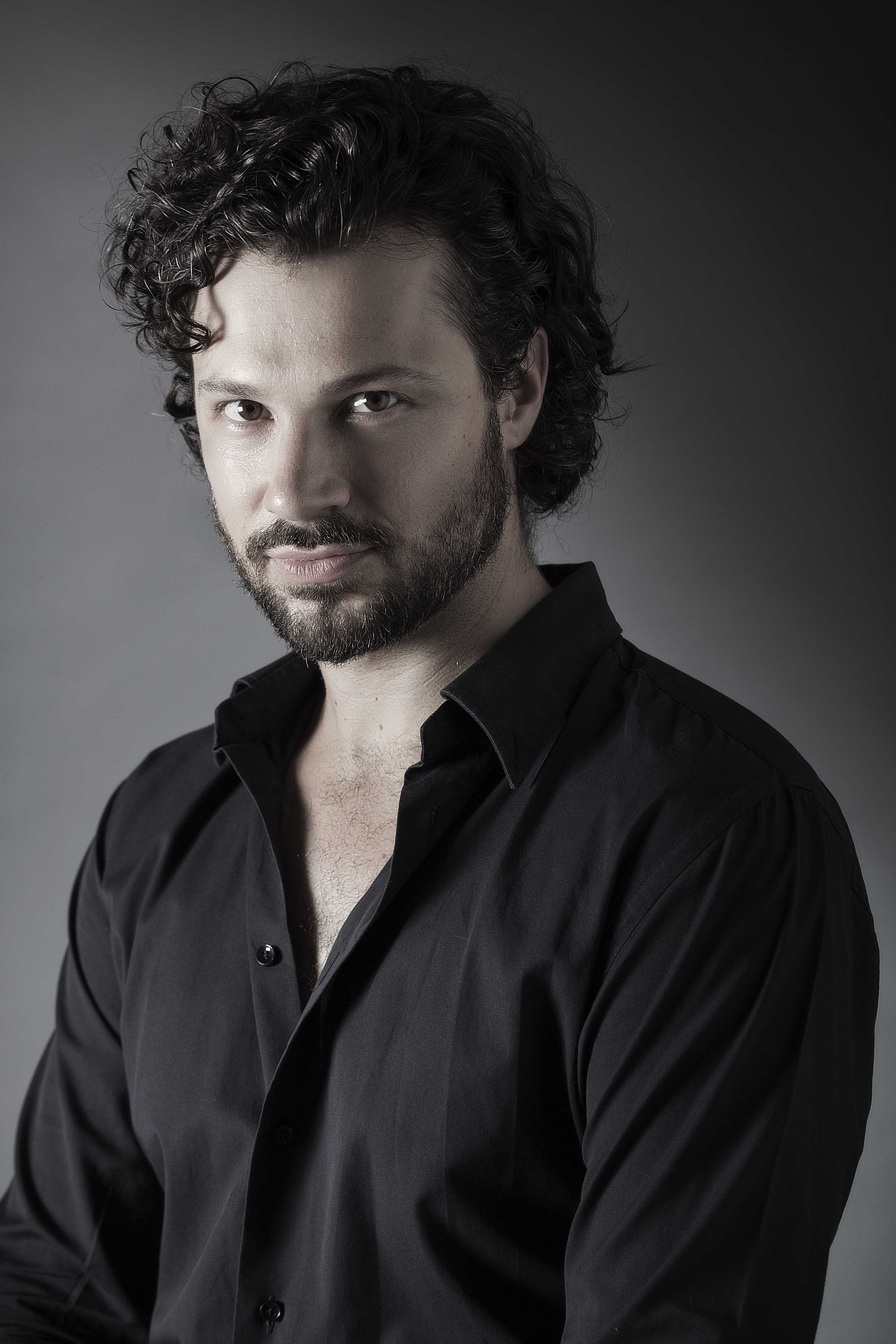
- Vermeulen in 2016
- Born: Hendrik Mentz Vermeulen; 7 April 1982 (age 44); Fauresmith, Free State Province, South Africa
- Occupations: Couturier, fashion designer, artist, singer, song writer, record producer, board member World Fashion Organisation
- Years active: 1997–present
- Labels: Hendrik Vermeulen (1997–present); Simply Vermeulen (2013–present); Studio3 Records (2015 - present)
- Spouse: Jean-Daniel Meyer-Vermeulen (m.2012)
- Website: www.hendrikvermeulen.com www.johurban.com

Hendrik Meyer-Vermeulen (born Hendrik Mentz Vermeulen, 7 April 1982) is a South African Couturier and fashion designer, specialising in Haute Couture and Corsetry as well as a singer-songwriter performing under stage name Joh Urban.

In 2009 Hendrik Vermeulen launched his label Hendrik Vermeulen Couture, having previously worked as fashion designer and chef d’atelier for renowned South African Couturiers, such as Gert van de Merwe.

In 2012, he legalised his business by creating his own company: Hendrik Vermeulen Couture Pty Ltd in the city of Cape Town, South Africa. He took charge of the creative and financial side of the business as Creative Director and placed his husband Jean-Daniel Meyer-Vermeulen at the head of the company as General Manager. The company opened its first flagship boutique across the famous Heritage Square in the City Centre of Cape Town the following year in 2013.

Following the start of popular demand, the designer started his line of Prêt-à-Porter in 2014 and launched the brand Simply Vermeulen during the renowned Design Indaba in March of the same year. Hendrik Vermeulen remains one of the very few South African designers who have successfully appeared on the calendar of International Fashion Weeks and showcased their work on prestigious fashion platforms such as: New York Fashion Week, Milan Fashion Week and Alta Roma / Rome Fashion Week in 2015 and 2016.

== Early life ==
After the sudden death of his father, Johannes Urbanus, the couture prodigy aged six started sewing under the supervision of his mother, Gerbrecht Christina Naudé, a skilled seamstress and talented dressmaker who was renowned in her community for her excellent sewing skills. At age 15, he sold his first evening dress and started to focus all his attention on the fashion industry while attending various related fashion workshops and classes.

In the beginning of 2001, he enrolled in an intensive Couture course at FCI, a fashion institute with schools in Pretoria, South Africa, and California, USA, and finished his 4-year program accelerated over 2 years while grabbing the "Student of the Year" award and receiving his diploma in Couture in 2003.

== Fashion career ==
In 2007, Hendrik Vermeulen decided to start his own business by producing custom-made bridal wear and exclusive formal evening wear under his own name, the Hendrik Vermeulen Couture label was born.

Hendrik received his first invitation to an International fashion week in 2010. A collective of earlier work was showcased at Mozambique Fashion Week in Maputo the same year. The following year, Hendrik became the first South African designer to receive a second invitation and to showcase a second time at Mozambique Fashion Week during their 2014 edition in Maputo.

In March 2011, Hendrik Vermeulen was appointed as a board member of the World Fashion Council to endeavour to make a difference by empowering women through skills development for the future of the World Fashion. In 2012, he was appointed a board member of the South African National Chapter of the World Fashion Organization. Also in 2012, Hendrik Vermeulen Couture showcases at the first edition of the Perth Fashion Week. The presentation thrilled the audience with a South African Inspired Collection called "Nkosi Sikelel' iAfrica" (God Bless Africa). This was the start of Hendrik's passion for creating his own unique fabrics through various methods of fabric manipulation, hand dyeing, and airbrushing, having learned some of the skills required while practising one of his hobbies, carpentry.

With the arrival of Digital Fabric Printing in South Africa, Hendrik started working very closely with a Cape Town-based printing company to perfect the reactive dye process on silk and other natural fibres. This inspiration led to the creation of the "Reflections of Subterranean Luxury" collection, putting his newly acquired skills to the test. The collection was first presented during the launch of the prêt-à-porter label Simply Vermeulen at the Design Indaba in March 2013.

Early in 2014, Hendrik's work caught the eye of AltaRoma's vice president, Valeria Mangani. The Couture house received its first invitation to showcase at World of Fashion part of Rome Fashion Week's calendar. Hendrik showed off his corsetry skills and knowledge of the female body acquired during his study of physiology, by creating a range called "Insecta Mirabilis", a collection combining a vast array of couture skills and body manipulation through corsetry.

In 2015 the Hendrik Vermeulen House received its first invitation to New York and Milan Fashion Week through FTL Moda. This gave the prêt-à-porter label Simply Vermeulen, the opportunity to explore the field of Prêt-à-Couture, in a collection entitled "Smoke and Mirrors". The Couture house added a new element to its already wide spectrum of techniques, by working with African antelope leather from ethical source. During the NYFW presentation, Hendrik welcomed the inclusion of disabled models (that he calls: differently abled models) to the runway. Using the media attention gathered for this collection, Hendrik spoke out about the unhealthy way the fashion industry is forcing people to look at themselves in comparison to the highly edited, unobtainable perfection depicted in High Fashion Campaigns.

Later in the same year, an invitation to showcase at AltaRoma / World of Fashion was presented again, this was the start of a collaboration with a non-profit ocean conservation initiative headed by Hendrik Vermeulen's close friend Hanli Prinsloo, the "I Am Water Ocean Conservation" foundation, through a collection of the same title. This also reignited a past passion of Hendrik's, music. Hendrik wrote a poem based on the ocean, and composed a song entitled Ndingamanzi ('I Am Water' in Xhosa), in his home based recording studio, which he subsequently recorded with two prominent South African artists: Zolani Mahola and Bianca LeGrange. This song was released in New York at the Vanderbilt Hall on the day of the fashion presentation during American World Champion swimmer and I Am Water Foundation Program Director Peter Marshall's introduction speech, with part of the profits of the song and fashion sale going to the foundation.

The 2016 "I Am Water" collection was used as a way to show the skills of the Vermeulen House as it comprised four collections in one: Swimwear, Resort, Prêt-à-Couture and Couture. It was showcased at Vanderbilt Hall, at New York Central Station under the umbrella of FTL Moda and in partnership with the Christopher & Dana Reeve Foundation as well as Global Disability Inclusion. This runway show was named one of the most exciting moments in history due to the first ever international catwalk and participation of Australian Down Syndrome Model, Madeline Stuart and the promotion of "differently abled" models; some of them, like congenital amputee model Shaholly Ayers, having since made career following the event. Hendrik again made use of the news coverage to bring light to discrimination against minorities.

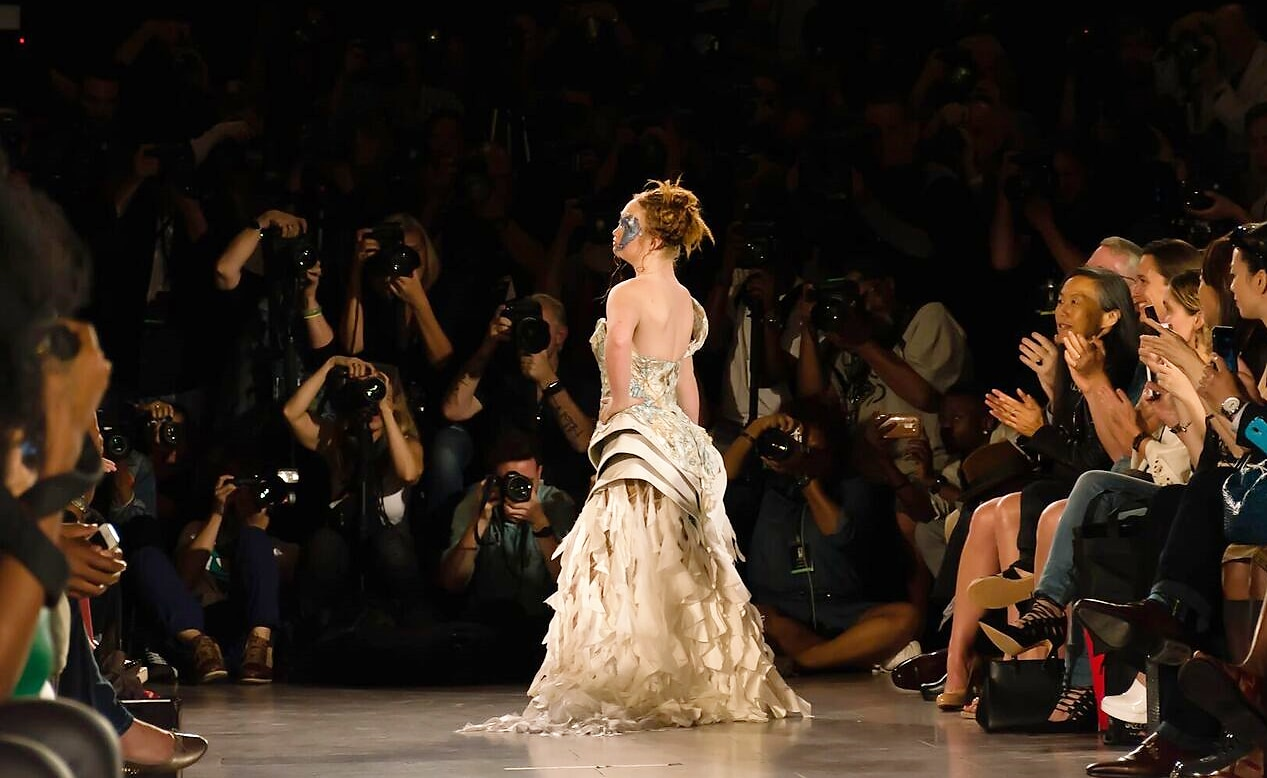
Model Madeline Stuart wearing Hendrik Vermeulen bridal couture on the FTL Moda ramp at NYFW - Vanderbilt Hall at Grand Central Station, NYC

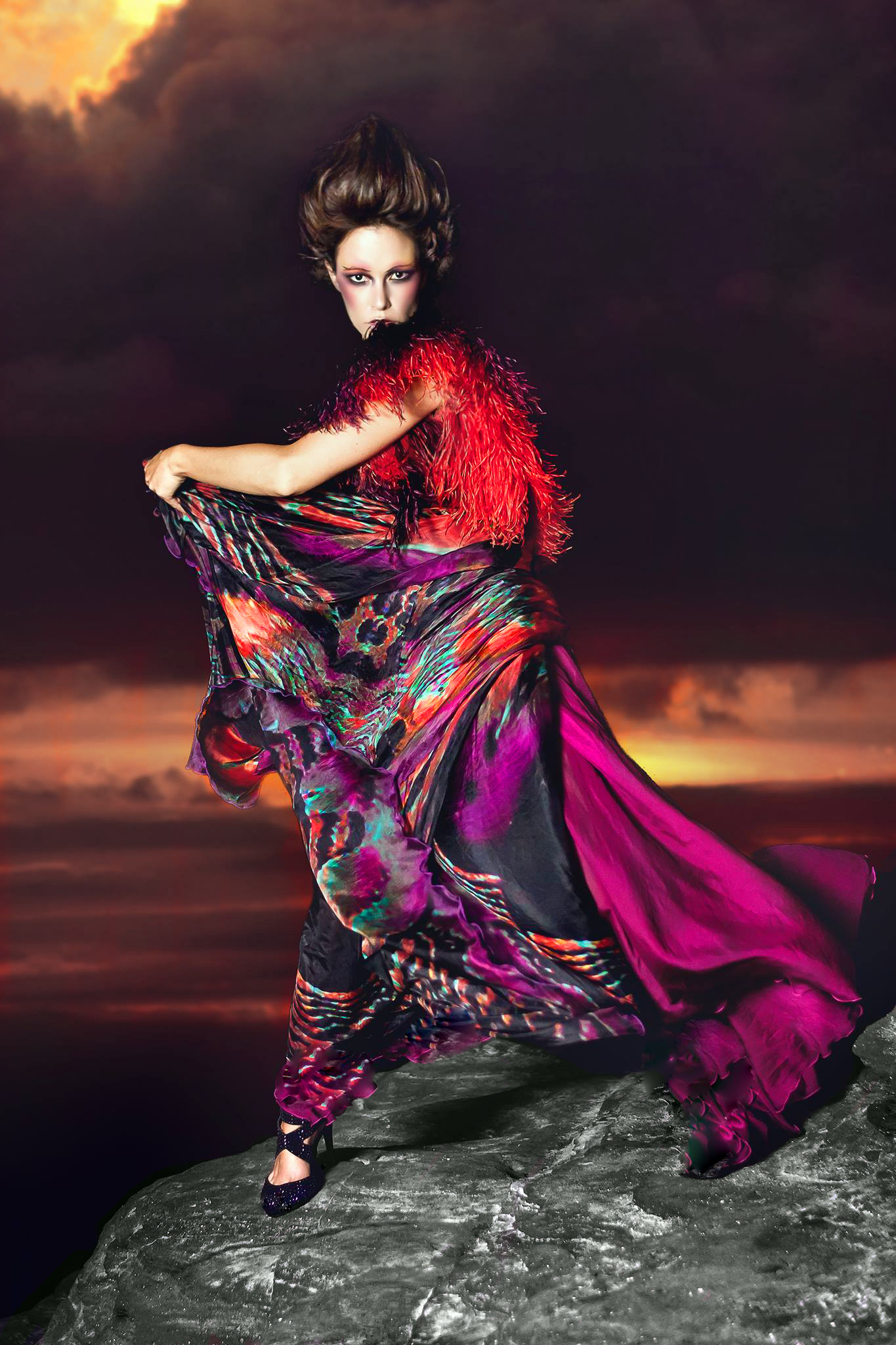
Model Shaholly Ayers wearing Hendrik Vermeulen on photoshoot for FTL Moda in Hawaii

Hendrik has been noted as a multifaceted designer, due to his overall vision. He uses his skills and talents across many areas and combines it into one story. His skill set ranges from design and conceptualising collections, to execution. He participates in all creative and managerial aspects of the Hendrik Vermeulen brand and labels. His keen eye for balance makes him a trusted collaborator for many film makers, singers, photographers and other artists.

As a leader in his field, Hendrik Vermeulen is often invited as guest speaker during fashion presentations or during special events such as the Africa Luxury & Wealth Summit.

== Music career ==
Joh Urban was born and raised in the small farming community of South Africa. Music was a family affair, with his parents and siblings partaking in musical activities for recreation. His father Johannes Urbanus Vermeulen having created a band with his siblings when he was a teenager. Joh enjoyed writing music from a young age and frequently recorded his compositions on his small handheld cassette player.

As a multifaceted artist, Joh Urban has many personas and artistic disciplines: couturier, fashion designer, photo model, composer, songwriter, music producer and singer. He believes in tireless work to perfect one's skills in order to bring artistic ideas to life. "Everyone has ideas and talent, many could become successful artists in their own right, but the true art lies in the execution of these ideas and the use of talent. This will depend on how much time you are willing to invest in learning the skills required to bring them to life". (JohUrban.com)

Joh Urban first published song called "Ndingamanzi" ('I Am Water' in Xhosa) is a collaboration with South African artists Zolani Mahola and Bianca LeGrange. The song was written with the I Am Water Foundation in mind; the foundation is an Ocean Conservation non-profit organisation based in South Africa and the U.S. (www.iamwaterfoundation.org) The song was first aired during the opening of Hendrik Vermeulen fashion show at the Vanderbilt Hall in the Grand Central Station, New York City.

The following songs have been written by Hendrik Mentz Vermeulen, sung by the artist Joh Urban and have been published by Studio3 Records for distribution on the main music platforms; such as Spotify, Apple Music, iTunes, YouTube, YouTube Music, Tidal, Amazon Music, Google Play Music, Deezer & Napster :

- "Riptide" on YouTube 2020
- Weather Girl 2017
- Butterfly 2020
- Absolution 2020
- Hooked on You 2020
- "Narcissus" on YouTube 2020
