= Seda =

Seda or SEDA may refer to:

== Acronyms ==
- Safe and Effective Drug Act, a bill proposed in the United States House of Representatives in 2004
- Seeing Eye Dogs Australia, an Australian organisation
- Staff and Educational Development Association, a professional association of university staff developers
- Staged event-driven architecture, an Internet server software architecture
- Standby Equity Distribution Agreement, a financing agreement

== People ==
=== Given name ===
- Seda Aznavour (born 1947), French-Armenian singer and artist
- Seda Gören Bölük (born 1983), Turkish politician
- Seda Nur İncik (born 2000), Turkish footballer
- Seda Kaçan, Turkish racing driver
- Seda Melkonian (born 1963), Lebanese-Armenian activist and lecturer
- Seda Sayan (born 1964), Turkish pop singer
- Seda Tokatlıoğlu (born 1986), Turkish volleyball player
- Seda Tutkhalyan (born 1999), Russian artistic gymnast
- Seda Yıldız (born 1998), Turkish Paralympian goalball player
- Seda Yörükler (born 1984), Turkish handballer

=== Surname ===
- Seda (surname)
- Šeda, Czech surname
- Šedá, feminine form of the Czech surname Šedý

== Places ==
- Seda, Lithuania, city
- Seda, Latvia, town
- Seda (river), in Latvia
- Seda County, or Sêrtar County, county in Sichuan, China

== Other uses ==
- "Seda" (Bad Bunny song)
- Seda Hotels, Philippine hotel chain
- Seda (magazine), published in Iran
- "Seda", song by Foo Fighters from their album Echoes, Silence, Patience & Grace
