= Seda (surname) =

Seda is a surname. Notable people with the surname include:

- César Seda (born 1986), Puerto Rican boxer
- Dori Seda (1951–1988), American comics artist
- Frans Seda (1926–2009), Indonesian politician
- Heriberto Seda (born 1967), American serial killer
- Jon Seda (born 1970), American actor
- Luís Seda (born 1976), Puerto Rican boxer
- Roberto Seda, American politician

== See also ==
- Šeda, Czech masculite surname
- Šedá, Czech feminine surname
- Seda (given name)
