= Afford (disambiguation) =

The term afford (or AFFORD) may refer to:

- Affordance, a potential action enabled by an object
- Afford (surname), an English surname
- Australian Foundation for Disability, an Australian non-profit organization
