= Charlie and the Bhoys =

Irish Folk Band

- Origin: Barlanark, Glasgow, Scotland
- Genres: Irish rebel music, Irish folk, Pan-Celticism
- Years active: 1989–present
- Labels: A-One Music, Charlie and the Bhoys,
- Members: Charlie Boyle; Jimmy; Rab; Tam; Frankie; Wardie
- Website: www.charlieandthebhoys.com

Charlie and the Bhoys are a Glasgow Celtic-themed Irish folk band from Scotland. They formed the band in the 1980s in Barlanark in the East End of Glasgow and played their first concert at the Squirrel Bar in the Gallowgate, Glasgow in 1989. They branded themselves as the "No.1 Glasgow Celtic Band in the World" in their early years but have since dropped this. The band have played the Glasgow Barrowland Ballroom 50 times.

In February 2015, the band wrote a charity song for Celtic superfan Jay Beatty for the charity Downs and Proud which reached the top 100 of the UK iTunes charts and top 10 of the iTunes Country chart.

== History ==
In 2011, the band was due to play a Saint Patrick's Day gig at the East Kilbride Civic Centre but due to "safety concerns" raised as the result of an organised campaign by Rangers fans, South Lanarkshire Council cancelled the event. It was later reorganised and held at an undisclosed location on Blantyre after accusations of a "witch hunt" against them.

In 2013, they participated in the Ardoyne Fleadh.

In 2015, concerns from residents in Cambuslang over the holding of a concert at the council-owned Cambuslang Institute, which sparked protests from members of the Loyalist community who stated the band sang "pro-IRA" songs.

== Discography ==
Charlie and the Bhoys have released 10 albums to date + 1 official DVD:

- Charlie and the Bhoys (Yellow Album) - 1996
- Live at Glasgow Barrowlands - 1998
- Unplugged - 1999
- The Greatest Celtic Album in the World Ever! - 1999
- Dedicated - 2001
- The Very Best Of - 2003
- Raised on Celtic - 2005
- Hail Hail The Songs Are Here - 2006
- Dreams and Songs to Sing - 2007
- What The Hell Do We Care - 2009
- 25 IN A ROW - 2014

- DVD - Live at Glasgow Barrowlands 2005

== Band members ==
- Charlie Boyle (not Devlin!) (founding member 1989 -)
- Jimmy (founding member)
- Rab (1999-)
- Tam (2004-)
- Frankie (founding member)
- Wardie (1991-)

== Charity work ==
The band were the first to fund the charity for the Celtic legend Tommy Burns. A five-figure sum was donated to the newly formed charity.

The band auctioned (1 of only 2) 20th anniversary banners in 2010 through eBay/Oxfam for the Haiti earthquake disaster. Paul Morrison of Condorrat, Cumbernauld won with a top bid of £255. Paul is now the only person outside the band to have this banner, the other one will always remain with the band.

In September 2009, the band wrote a song on behalf of friends and family of the late Kevin McDaid who was killed in Coleraine. The song was placed on IndieStore as a download which shot to number 1 in the IndieStore charts. All proceeds were donated to the family.

In New York in 2007, the band appeared for the local Celtic Supporters Clubs to raise $5000 which was donated to the Glasgow Cancer Hospice.

The band were honoured back in 2004 to head over to Sligo to headline an event to help raise money for the Brother Walfrid Statue. The band also helped the James Connolly Johnstone CSC with gigs in Bothwell for the (Jinky) Jimmy Johnstone statue in Viewpark, North Lanarkshire, Scotland.

In 2001, with The Brazen Head, a night was arranged with a selected audience for Bobby Murdoch. Bobby was the first Lisbon Lion to die. With guests including Billy McNeill and Tony Roper £12,000 was raised for Bobby's family.

== See also ==
- Celtic F.C.
- Bertie Auld
- Johnny Doyle
- Willie Maley

== Sources ==
- Doc Milligan's, Review – Doc Milligan's, Canada
- Philly Newspaper Article – The Philadelphia Inquirer
- Official Website Archives http://www.charlieandthebhoys.com
- West of Scotland double standards - Fanzone - Fanzone
- Ardoyne Fleadh headline for the 3rd year running – Belfast Telegraph
- Ardoyne Fleadh, Belfast – UTV News
- Downs and Proud Charity Song - The Celts Are Here – The Celts Are Here
- Big Jock Stein Song – Musix Match
- Sarnia, Canada Event The Observer
- St.Patrick's Concert Cancelled by Rangers fans – Scottish TV News
- Norway Celtic Fans Yearly Event – Celtic Supporters Club Norway
- The Bhoys are in town - Canarian Weekly News
- Ghost in Barrowland crowd - Glasgow Live
