= Grace Strobel =

American model, brand representative, and motivational speaker

Grace Elizabeth Strobel
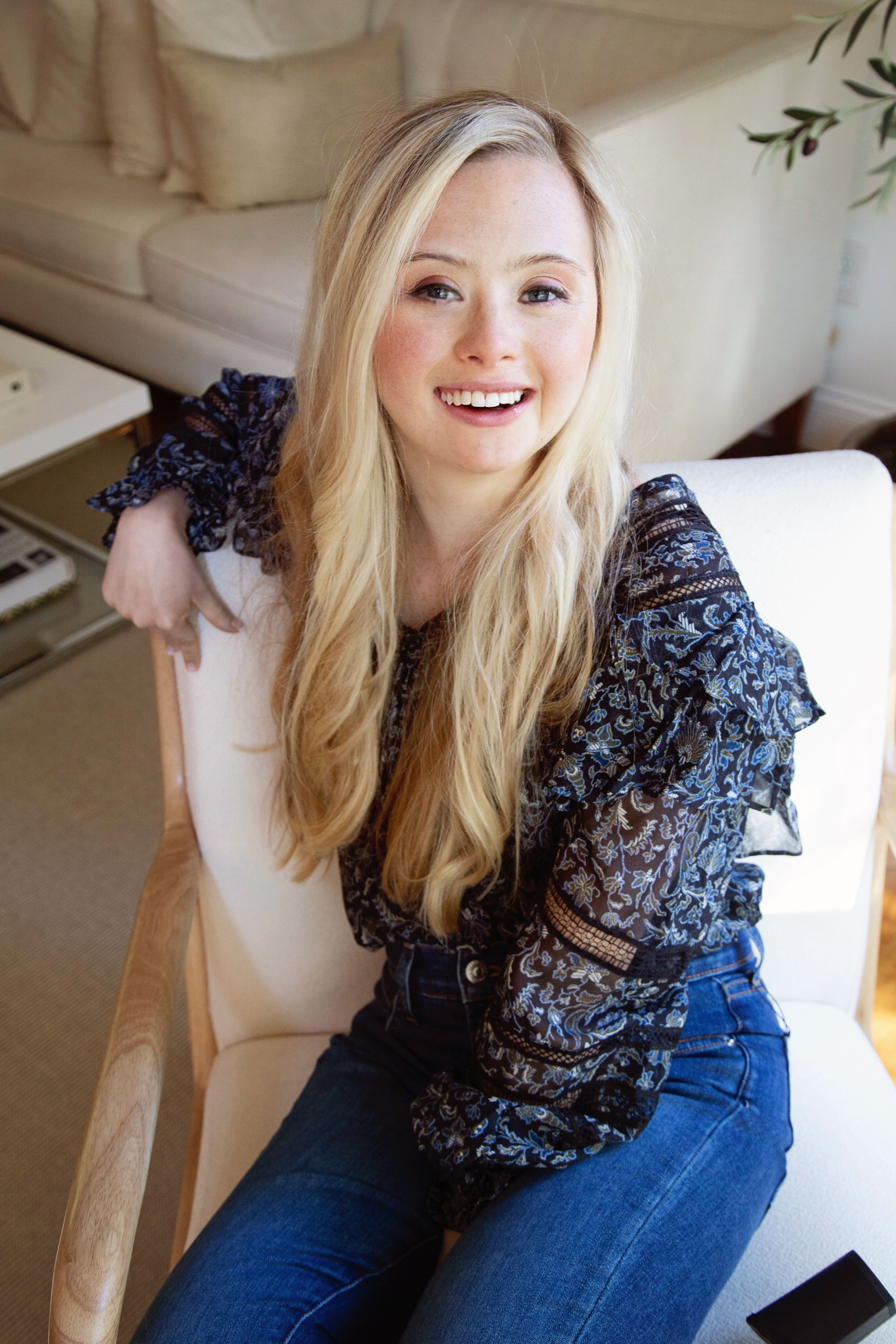
- Born: June 28, 1996 (age 30); Irvine, California, U.S.A.
- Occupations: Model, Brand Representative, Speaker
- Years active: 2017–present
- Agent(s): InVu Model and Talent, Zebedee Talent, Gamut Management
- Known for: Down Syndrome Model and Youth Outreach Speaker
- Awards: Women of Achievement (for Youth Outreach), 2021; Watson Family Achievement Award, Pujols Family Foundation, 2022

Grace Elizabeth Strobel (born June 28, 1996) is a St. Louis-based model, brand representative, and motivational speaker. She is the first American with Down syndrome to represent a major international skincare line. She is an advocate for people with disabilities "whose mission is to change society's view and perception of people with disabilities".

== Early life ==
Strobel was diagnosed at birth with Down syndrome, a genetic disorder featuring an extra chromosome that results in developmental and intellectual delays. Her parents, Linda and Jeff Strobel, were told their daughter would face a lifetime of challenges and likely never read or write. The Strobels were discontent with those predictions and gave her therapeutic exercises, home schooling, and eventually, public school. Despite all the challenges, Strobel was determined. "Doctors told my mom and dad that I would not achieve much ... that I would never even tie my own shoes," she said. "I'm here today to tell you they were wrong."

== Modeling ==
Her interest in modeling began when she was conducting research for #TheGraceEffect, a presentation about living with disability that she gives to students. She discovered Madeline Stuart and Ellie Goldstein, also models with Down syndrome, which inspired Strobel to wonder if she too could become a model. Grace has been featured in Forbes, Allure, Brides and Vows Magazine, PBS, The Today Show, and FentyBeauty.

After a viral post, Strobel was featured on the cover of Chesterfield Lifestyle Magazine in February 2019.

She has been featured in campaigns by Rihanna's FentyBeauty, Obagi skincare, Alivia, Justin Alexander, Kendra Scott, and Veronica Beard.

She has appeared at Atlantic City Fashion Week 2019 for designer Ola Hawatmeh and New York Fashion Week runway for Tommy Hilfiger Adaptive / Runway of Dreams 2020.

In October 2020, she was named Obagi's Skinclusion Ambassador and recently signed for her third year of contract representation.

== Other ==
In 2022, the St. Louis-based Missouri Historical Society added seven of her donated clothing items to its permanent collection, stating that they had done so both because she is a notable local woman and because they offered an alternative to "stereotypical representations of life with a disability". In 2021, Grace was award the prestigious Women of Achievement Award for Youth Outreach and Advocacy and The Watson Award by The Pujols Foundation.

== See also ==
- List of people with Down syndrome
