= Gestsson =

Gestsson is a patronymic (see Icelandic name). Notable people with the patronymic include:

- Auðunn Gestsson (1938–2020), Icelandic newspaper salesman
- Pálmi Gestsson (born 1957), Icelandic actor and voice actor
- Svavar Gestsson (1944–2021), Icelandic politician
- Teitur Gestsson (born 1992), Faroese football goalkeeper
