= Awford =

Awford is an English surname. Notable people with the surname include:

- Andy Awford (born 1972), English footballer and coach
- Nick Awford (born 1995), English footballer

== See also ==
- Afford (surname)
- Alford (surname)
- Ford (disambiguation)
