= Šedý =

Šedý (feminine: Šedá) is a Czech surname. Notable people with the surname include:

- Jiří Šedý (born 1976), Czech artist and writer
- Kateřina Šedá (born 1977), Czech artist
