= Robbie Savage (football fan) =

Namibian football fan

Robson ″Robbie″ Savage (31 January 1967 – 20 July 2017) was a Namibian football fan and socialite. He was the official mascot of the Brave Warriors, Namibia's national football team, as well as of the first inter-racial rugby match between South Africa and pre-independent Namibia in 1987.

Savage was born on 31 January 1967 and grew up in Windhoek's Khomasdal suburb. He had three sisters. He had Down syndrome and was the widest-known Namibian that lived with the disease. Already in his youth he developed a passion for football and attended countless major and minor events. Later he supported other sports codes as well, notably boxing and athletics, and he was a noticeable member of the audience in uncountable high-profile Namibian social events. This was to an extent that on several occasions his unlikely absence would be noticed, for instance at a concert of The Rockets in Windhoek that was opened with the question "Where is Robbie?"

Although a poor man throughout his life, Savage's role as mascot of the Brave Warriors enabled him to tour the African continent for several sports events. Namibian president (then prime minister) Hage Geingob, himself an ardent football fan, took him to the 1998 African Cup of Nations in Burkina Faso. Savage, without being invited, attended a personal talk between the two Prime Ministers there, and he also took the opportunity to inspect the Burkinabé Guard of honour.

Nampa CEO Isack Hamata writes that through his frequent public appearances "he unknowingly de-stigmatised Downs Syndrome". Savage was hospitalised at Katutura State Hospital in May 2017 after having a stroke. He also developed diabetic ketoacidosis and died from this complication on 20 July 2017.

== See also ==
- List of people with Down syndrome
