= Lisa Thon =

Puerto Rican fashion designer

Lisa Thon is a fashion designer born in San Juan, Puerto Rico.

== Biography ==
After graduating from high school, Thon began her studying fashion at the Altos de Chavón in Dominican Republic and completed her bachelor's degree at Parsons School of Design in New York City.

In 1996, Thon established her brand recognition, and opened her store and Fashion Design School in San Juan, Puerto Rico. They are located at 992 Muñoz Rivera Avenue (one of the most commercial avenues of the island), nearby the University of Puerto Rico.

Thon presented her first collection to the American market at the Midtown Exhibition Center in the Parsons New School for Design in September 2005. Lisa, then showed her Spring-Summer 2007 collection to be presented in Olympus Fashion Week in September 2006.

She presented her new collection as part of the New York Fashion Week on September 6, 2007, on Bryant Park Grill.

In 2020, Thon presented a collection in Latin Fashion Week Colorado's virtual fashion show.
