= Birmingham Fashion Week =

- Status: Inactive
- Genre: Fashion
- Frequency: Annual
- Locations: Birmingham, Alabama
- Country: United States
- Inaugurated: 2011
- Founders: Heidi Elnora, Jeana Lee Thompson
- Most recent: 2016

Birmingham Fashion Week (BFW), was a series of annual fashion week events, held between 2011 and 2016 in Birmingham, Alabama. The event showcased three nights of runway shows, featuring both local designers and national brands. The event has been inactive since 2016.

== Student Competition ==
The event included a Rising Design Star competition, for local middle and high school students, Out of 300 submissions, and 60 finalists in its final year. Winners of the challenge received cash prizes and college scholarship through the University of Alabama and Savannah College of Art and Design.

== History ==
The event was founded in 2011 by Heidi Elnora, Jeana Lee Thompson to showcase local fashion talent. Starting as a one night show and later evolving into a three-day event. Notably, model Madeline Stuart, known for being the first professional model with Down syndrome opened the event in 2016. That same year, at the Boutwell Memorial Auditorium during the finale of the event, co-founder Heidi Elnora revealed that if the event failed to gain new financial backing, that it would not be able to return the following year.

== See also ==
- List of fashion events
- List of fashion events in the United States
