= Ali Topaloğlu =

Turkish athlete

Ali Topaloğlu (born 1998) is a Turkish world and European champion track and field athlete with Down syndrome. He is a member of Canik Belediyespor in Samsun.

Ali Topaloğlu started playing sports at the age of fifteen motivated by his father. Since 2014, he has been competing at international championships and has won several gold medals.

He won the silver medal in the Mosaic discus event at the 2017 IAADS European Athletics Championships held in Vila Nova de Gaia, Portugal. At the 2018 World Championships for Athletes with Down Syndrome in Madeira, Portugal, he became world champion in the shot put event and won two silver medals in discus and 200 m. He became the European champion and set a world record in the shot put event of the 2019 Open European Championships for Athletes with Down Syndrome in Tampere, Finland.

== Achievements ==
Year	Competition	Venue	Position	Event	Notes
Representing Turkey
2017	IAADS European Athletics Championships	Vila Nova de Gaia, Portugal	2nd	Mosaic Discus	23.38 m
2018	World Championships for Athletes with Down Syndrome	Madeira, Portogal	4th	Javelin (600 g)	12.73
2018	World Championships for Athletes with Down Syndrome	Madeira, Portogal	1st	Shot put (4 kg)	10.04 m
2018	World Championships for Athletes with Down Syndrome	Madeira, Portogal	2nd	Discus (1 kg)	25.77 m
2018	World Championships for Athletes with Down Syndrome	Madeira, Portogal	2nd	200 m	32.14
2019	5th IAADS Open European Athletics Championships	Tampere, Finland	1st	Mosaic Shot put	10,96 m WR

== See also ==
- List of people with Down syndrome
