= Night Always Comes =

2025 film by Benjamin Caron

- Release poster
- Directed by: Benjamin Caron
- Screenplay by: Sarah Conradt
- Based on: The Night Always Comes by Willy Vlautin
- Produced by: Gary Levinsohn; Billy Hines; Ryan Bartecki; Benjamin Caron; Jodie Caron; Vanessa Kirby; Lauren Dark
- Starring: Vanessa Kirby; Jennifer Jason Leigh; Zack Gottsagen; Stephen James; Randall Park; Julia Fox; Michael Kelly; Eli Roth
- Cinematography: Damián García
- Edited by: Yan Miles
- Music by: Adam Janota Bzowski
- Production companies: H2L Media Group; Aluna Entertainment; Square Eyed Pictures
- Distributed by: Netflix
- Release date: August 15, 2025
- Running time: 108 minutes
- Country: United States
- Language: English

Night Always Comes is a 2025 American crime thriller drama film directed by Benjamin Caron from a script by Sarah Conradt, adapting the 2021 novel The Night Always Comes by Willy Vlautin. It stars Vanessa Kirby, Jennifer Jason Leigh, Zack Gottsagen, Stephen James, Randall Park, Julia Fox, Michael Kelly, and Eli Roth.

Night Always Comes was released on Netflix on August 15, 2025.

== Plot ==
In a rapidly gentrifying Portland, Oregon, Lynette is a young woman who juggles multiple low-wage jobs, including working at a commercial bakery and a bar, while also caring for her older brother with Down syndrome, Kenny. Lynette's greatest goal is to buy the rented house where they live with their mother, Doreen, to secure stability for Kenny and prevent him from potentially being taken into state care. Lynette has meticulously saved the $25,000 needed for a down payment. Due to Lynette's bad credit, current homeowner David has given them a deadline of 9:00 AM the following morning to finalize the purchase, which also requires Doreen to co-sign the loan.

On the day of the closing, Lynette returns home to discover that Doreen has unilaterally spent the entire $25,000 on a new car for herself, stating that she refuses to be financially trapped by the house, which she sees as a painful reminder of her estranged husband. Furious and facing eviction, Lynette is forced to find the full $25,000 in less than 24 hours. Lynette first tries to call in a favor from Scott, a wealthy former client from when she did sex work. She meets him at a hotel bar and, after providing him with sexual services, asks for a loan, but he coldly dismisses her financial desperation, stating he only pays for a "good time." In a fit of reckless desperation, Lynette steals Scott's Mercedes from the hotel parking garage.

Next, Lynette seeks her friend, Gloria, who owes her money from her days in sex work. Gloria, who is now living an upscale life as the mistress of a powerful, corrupt politician, claims she cannot help. However, Lynette notices a small safe in the apartment. Lynette recruits Cody, a co-worker from the bar with a criminal past, to help her steal Gloria's safe. Cody reluctantly agrees, seeing a chance to make money. They successfully steal the safe and take it to a remote auto repair shop owned by Drew to have it cracked open.

Inside the safe is approximately $19,000 in cash, high-end watches, and a large package of cocaine. A greedy Drew attempts to steal the entire contents, leading to a violent struggle where Lynette is forced to wound Drew to escape with the bag containing the cash, watches, and cocaine. Lynette and Cody drive to the stolen Mercedes. Cody, angry that Lynette has involved him in a serious crime and is now refusing to split the unexpected cocaine profits, attempts to leave with the bag of cash. Lynette runs him over with her old car to retrieve the money, and leaves the injured Cody the keys to the car.

Still needing several thousand dollars, Lynette's last resort is to sell the cocaine. She contacts Tommy, her manipulative former pimp who groomed her into sex work when she was 16. The meeting reopens deep emotional trauma for Lynette, but Tommy agrees to put her in touch with a buyer. After picking up Kenny for lack of other care, she meets the buyer, Blake, at a rave party. After Blake pays Lynette, he makes aggressive sexual advances toward her, leading her to violently fight him off before running away with the cash.

The sun is rising as a bloodied and distraught Lynette returns home with the money. Lynette is ready to move forward with the purchase, but Doreen finally confesses that she never intended to buy the house, as she views it as a source of misery and a reminder of her failed marriage. The next blow comes from the realtor: another buyer has made a better offer, and the bank has accepted it, making all of Lynette's perilous efforts ultimately futile in saving the house. Recognizing that her constant sacrifice is enabling her mother's irresponsibility and that her mother does not share her vision of a stable home, Lynette decides to break the destructive cycle. She leaves the cash and watches she recovered for Doreen to use for a new apartment with Kenny. After a tearful final goodbye to her brother, Lynette walks away, deciding to leave Portland and start a new life for herself, finally choosing her own survival and future over the obligation of a broken past.

== Cast ==
- Vanessa Kirby as Lynette
- Jennifer Jason Leigh as Doreen, Lynette and Kenny's mother
- Zack Gottsagen as Kenny, Lynette's older brother
- Stephan James as Cody, an ex-felon who works with Lynette at the bar
- Randall Park as Scott, a client of Lynette when she was working as an escort
- Julia Fox as Gloria, an old friend of Lynette's who owes her money
- Michael Kelly as Tommy, Lynette's ex-boyfriend who forced her into sex work when she was 16
- Eli Roth as Blake, a man who Tommy refers Lynette to buy her cocaine
- J. Claude Deering as David
- Sean Martini as Drew, Repair shop owner
- Erin Way as The Lecturer in Kenny's school
- Smack Louis as Mike, Drew's aide

== Production ==
In March 2024, it was announced the film would be produced by Aluna Entertainment under their agreement with Netflix. The film, based on the 2021 novel by Willy Vlautin, would be directed by Benjamin Caron from a script by Sarah Conradt. Vanessa Kirby would star in and also produce the film. Also producing are Lauren Dark, Benjamin and Jodie Caron, Gary Levinsohn, and Billy Hines.

The cast also includes Jennifer Jason Leigh, Zack Gottsagen, Stephan James, Julia Fox, Eli Roth, Randall Park, and Michael Kelly.

Principal photography took place from May 14 to July 2, 2024, in Portland, Oregon, and at Mt. Hood Community College in Gresham, Oregon.

== Reception ==
On the review aggregator website Rotten Tomatoes, 52% of 62 critics' reviews are positive, with an average rating of 5.8/10. The website's consensus reads: "Despite Vanessa Kirby's strong performance, Night Always Comes falters with thin plotting, ill-crafted social critique, and underdeveloped characters." Metacritic, which uses a weighted average, assigned the film a score of 60 out of 100, based on 15 critics, indicating "mixed or average" reviews.
