= Private placement =

Funding round for chosen investors

Private placement or non-public offering is a funding round of securities which are sold not through a public offering, but rather through a private offering, mostly to a small number of chosen investors. Generally, these investors include friends and family, accredited investors, and institutional investors. Placement agents help find investors.

PIPE (Private Investment in Public Equity) deals are one type of private placement. SEDA (Standby Equity Distribution Agreement) is also a form of private placement. They are considered to present lower transaction costs for the issuer than public offerings.

Since private placements are not offered to the general public, they are prospectus exempt. Instead, they are issued through an offering memorandum. Private placements require administrative management and are typically sold through financial institutions such as investment banks. Online platforms are also used to manage the process and connect with potential investors.

== In the United States ==
Although these placements are subject to the Securities Act of 1933, the securities offered do not have to be registered with the Securities and Exchange Commission if the issuance of the securities conforms to an exemption from registrations as set forth in the Securities Act of 1933 and the associated SEC rules put into effect. Most private placements are offered under the Rules known as Regulation D. Different rules under Regulation D provide stipulations for offering a Private Placement, such as required financial criteria for investors or solicitation allowances. Private placements may typically consist of offers of common stock or preferred stock or other forms of membership interests, warrants or promissory notes (including convertible promissory notes), bonds, and purchasers are often institutional investors such as banks, insurance companies or pension funds. Common exemptions from the Securities Act of 1933 allow an unlimited number of accredited investors to purchase securities in an offering. Generally, accredited investors are those with a net worth in excess of $1 million or annual income exceeding $200,000 or $300,000 combined with a spouse. Under these exemptions, no more than 35 non-accredited investors may participate in a private placement. In most cases, all investors must have sufficient financial knowledge and experience to be capable of evaluating the risks and merits of investing in a company.

== Rankings ==
Equity & Equity-related (AM1) - Q2 2024
Placement Agents	2024 Rank	2023 Rank	Proceeds	Market Sh (%)	Market Share Ch.
JP Morgan & Co	1	1	6,402	16.0	-1.2
Citi	2	8	4,577	11.4	7.9
Goldman Sachs & Co	3	4	4,144	10.3	1.0
BofA Securities Inc	4	5	3,024	7.5	-0.9
Morgan Stanley	5	2	2,705	6.7	-6.3
Barclays	6	7	2,680	6.7	3.0
Wells Fargo & Co	7	13	1,875	4.7	2.7
HSBC Holdings PLC	8	12	1,762	4.4	2.3
TD Securities Inc	9	35	1,004	2.5	2.2
Mizuho Financial Group	10	9	668	1.7	-0.8

Proceeds are year-over-year change in millions of USD. The industry total was $40,106 million.
