= Latin Fashion Week Colorado =

- Status: Active
- Genre: Fashion
- Frequency: Annual
- Locations: Denver, Colorado
- Years active: 2018-present
- Inaugurated: 2018
- Founders: Norberto Mojardin
- Most recent: 2023
- Organizer: Viva Colorado
- Website: www.latinfashionweekcolorado.com

Latin Fashion Week Colorado (LFWC) is an annual fashion event held in Denver, Colorado. The event features designers from across Latin America, including Mexico, Brazil, Colombia, and others. International and local Colorado designers participate as well. Latin Fashion Week Colorado was created was founded by Denver artist designer and hair stylist Norberto Mojardin in 2018, known for winning the 14th Paper Fashion Show with his design "Aztec Princess". As a designer himself, Norberto Mojardin often creates and presents collections at the event. The event was created to promote inclusivity and diversity among underrepresented communities.

== History ==
The inaugural event took place in 2018 at the Wings Over the Rockies Air and Space Museum and drew in hundreds of attendees. In 2020, the event was held virtually. Most recently taking place in 2023, the event took place at the Auraria Campus and for the first time spanned two nights, local and international.

== Notable designers ==
- Lisa Thon
- Isabella Springmuhl Tejada
