= Paula Sage =

Scottish actress, activist (b. c. 1980)

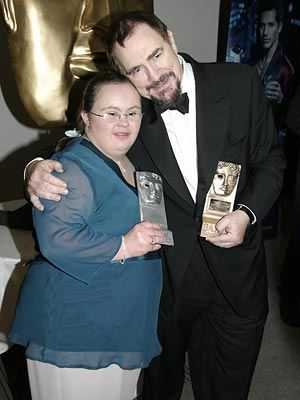
- Paula Sage receives her BAFTA award with Brian Cox
- Born: Paula Sage; 28 November 1980 (age 45); Cumbernauld, Scotland
- Years active: 2003-present

Paula Sage (born 28 November 1980) is a Scottish actress, Special Olympics netball player, and advocate for people with Down syndrome.

== Early life ==
Sage was adopted as an infant. Her parents are Alan and Mary Sage. Her father is a university lecturer. She attended primary school and high school in Cumbernauld, and attended the Merkland school in Kirkintilloch.

== Career ==
Sage's performance in the 2003 British film AfterLife, playing Roberta Brogan, brought her a BAFTA Scotland award for best first time performance and Best Actress in the Bratislava International Film Festival, 2004. Her character is sister to Kevin McKidd's character, and daughter to Lindsay Duncan's. In review, critic Liz Hoggard found "the most remarkable thing about the film is the purity of Sage's performance."

AfterLife also won the Audience Award at the 2005 Edinburgh International Film Festival. It also won Sage a role as Donna McCabe in BBC Scotland's River City soap.

Sage won a silver medal as a member of the British netball team at the Special Olympics. She is an ambassador for Down's Syndrome Scotland and Mencap, and a patron of the Ann Craft Trust. She was the first person with Down syndrome to be a Mencap ambassador. She worked part-time at a travel agency and cafe in Glasgow.

== See also ==
- List of people with Down syndrome
