= Ángela Bachiller =

Spanish politician

Ángela Covadonga Bachiller Guerra
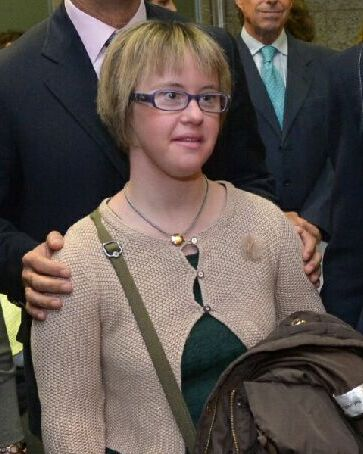

Valladolid town councillor
- Preceded by: Jesús García Galván

Personal details
- Born: Spain
- Party: People's Party
- As of 29 July, 2013

Ángela Covadonga Bachiller Guerra is a Spanish city councillor for Valladolid and a member of the People's Party. She became Spain's first city councillor with Down syndrome, sworn in on 29 July 2013. Bachiller had previously worked for two and a half years at Valladolid City Hall as an administrative assistant. She had the opportunity to stand when a fellow People's Party member politician stood down.

Mayor Francisco Javier León de la Riva described Bachiller as "an example of strength and of someone overcoming obstacles", while her boss in Valladolid's social welfare department, Rosa Hernández, said: "The most important thing is that her family didn't overprotect her. She's tenacious and capable of carrying out her work at all times."

The opposition Socialist Party (PSOE) supports Bachiller's appointment. "We see this as something perfectly normal" says Óscar Puente, the head of the Socialist Group in Valladolid City Council. "Let's hope that it encourages other people in her situation to play a bigger role in society."

== See also ==
- List of people with Down syndrome
