= Šeda =

Šeda (feminine: Šedová) is a Czech surname. Notable people with the surname include:

- Jan Šeda (born 1985), Czech footballer
- Michal Šeda (born 1982), Czech ice hockey player

== See also ==
- Kateřina Šedá (born 1977), Czech artist
