= Isabella Springmuhl Tejada =

Guatemalan fashion designer (born 1997)

- Born: 23 February 1997 (age 29)
- Occupation: fashion designer

Isabella Springmuhl Tejada (nickname, Belita; born 23 February 1997) is a Guatemalan fashion designer. She is noted for reportedly being the first fashion designer to have Down syndrome. Under her brand Down to Xjabelle, she creates sustainable designs using colorful Guatemalan fabrics. She is using the power of fashion to challenge the stereotypes and social discrimination she has experienced in response to her condition. Her designs were showcased at the International Fashion Showcase segment of London Fashion Week in 2016. The same year she was voted one of the BBC 100 Women.

== Background ==
Springmuhl is the youngest of four children. Her maternal grandmother was a talented designer herself, and she displayed talent as a young girl in drawing and making clothes for her dolls. After graduating from college as a bachelor in Sciences and Letters, she applied to study fashion but was rejected because of her Down syndrome. She was eventually admitted to a school to study it.

== Style ==
In her designs, Springmuhl is influenced by Guatemalan folklore. She has worked with numerous indigenous Guatemalan artists who are an influence on her. She makes accessories, wallets, ponchos and dresses, inspired by the culture of her country. She has also makes clothing designed especially for people with her condition. Her designs are typically vibrant, with colourful floral embroidery using old Guatemalan textiles. The BBC says of her designing: "She has her own unique design process. It starts with hand-picking vintage, authentic Guatemalan textiles from her trusted supplier in Antigua which are then taken back to her atelier and worked on by a seamstress and an embroidery expert, all according to Isabella's specifications."

== Acclaim ==
In 2015, Springmuhl was invited to showcase her work at the Ixchel Museum of Indigenous Textiles and Clothing in Guatemala. It was a success, and she sold out of her collection. She has since grown in popularity, and her designs were shown in Panama. In 2016 her dresses were showcased at the International Fashion Showcase segment of London Fashion Week. In October 2016 she was invited to Rome to showcase her designs. For her contribution to fashion and work, despite her condition, she was voted one of the BBC 100 Women in 2016.

In 2017, Isabella Springmuhl was portrayed by the Austrian photographer Manfred Scheucher, and she also talked about her experiences in a video. The photos were published in magazines worldwide and were also exhibited for months at the Austrian outdoor exhibition "Menschenbilder OÖ 2017".

In 2021, she created a collection for and participated in Latin Fashion Week Colorado.

== See also ==
- List of people with Down syndrome
