= Charlotte Woodward =

American sociologist and disability rights advocate

- Charlotte Woodward (left) with her mother Darcy Woodward (right).
- Born: 1989 or 1990 (age 36–37); Fairfax, Virginia, United States
- Education: North Virginia Community College; George Mason University (BA)

Charlotte Woodward is an American sociologist and disability rights activist, known for advocating for the prevention of discrimination against people with disabilities being evaluated for organ transplantation.

== Early life ==
Woodward is from Fairfax, Virginia. She was born with Down syndrome, a genetic disorder associated with physical and intellectual disability. When Woodward was born, her mother was told that Woodward would likely never learn to read or write. However, her mother believed that Woodward's potential ability was being underestimated, and she taught Woodward to read by age four.

Like approximately 50% of people with Down syndrome, Woodward was born with an atrioventricular congenital heart defect. This required her to undergo four open heart surgeries during her childhood, including three as an infant and one at age ten. As Woodward got older, her heart could no longer support her body and she developed various symptoms due to the condition such as fainting, low energy and shortness of breath. Her cardiologist determined she required a heart transplant, and advocated on her behalf due to fears that discrimination would prevent her from being considered eligible to undergo a transplant. After 11 days on the transplant list, she received a donor heart on January 30, 2012.

== Education ==
Woodward attended North Virginia Community College and graduated with an associate's degree in general studies.

Woodward is an alumna of George Mason University, where she studied a bachelor of arts with a major in sociology. During her time at the university, she was inducted into Alpha Kappa Delta (an international honors society for sociology) in 2019, won the Outstanding Sociology Undergraduate Student Award in 2021, and won the Mason Trailblazer Award in 2022. She graduated summa cum laude from the university in 2022.

== Advocacy and career ==
=== National Down Syndrome Society ===
Woodward became involved in disability advocacy after graduating high school, first joining her local Down syndrome advocacy group and later becoming a member of its board of directors. Through this work, she met people from the National Down Syndrome Society (NDSS), and was encouraged to apply for a job with the organization. She was first hired by the NDSS as a community outreach associate. Between 2022 and 2024, she worked as an education program associate, before being promoted to the role of program associate.

In 2020, Woodward created a TikTok video with the NDSS detailing the inequities facing people with Down syndrome, which received over 4.4 million views and covered by several news outlets. In the video, Woodward discussed issues such as how people with Down syndrome lose disability support payments if they get married, that they can be paid less than minimum wage, and how they are sometimes denied organ transplants due to their disability. She also discussed the death of Ethan Saylor, a 26-year-old with Down syndrome who was killed by police in 2013.

=== Charlotte Woodward Organ Transplant Discrimination Prevention Act ===
Woodward is the namesake of the Charlotte Woodward Organ Transplant Discrimination Prevention Act, a bipartisan bill that would restrict health practitioners from denying or restricting disabled patients' access to organ transplants based solely on their disability.

The bill was initially introduced to the United States Senate in 2021, but did not proceed further. In April 2025, the bill was introduced to the House of Representatives by Representatives Debbie Dingell and Kat Cammack and passed the House Energy and Commerce Committee with bipartisan support. In May 2025, the bill was reintroduced to the Senate by Senators Ashley Moody and Maggie Hassan. In June 2025, the bill passed the House with bipartisan support.

== Personal life ==
Woodward is in a long term relationship with Zack Gottsagen, an actor known for his starring role in the 2019 movie The Peanut Butter Falcon.

She has participated in the Global Down Syndrome Foundation's fashion show, Be Beautiful Be Yourself.
