= Collette Divitto =

American disability rights activist (born 1990)

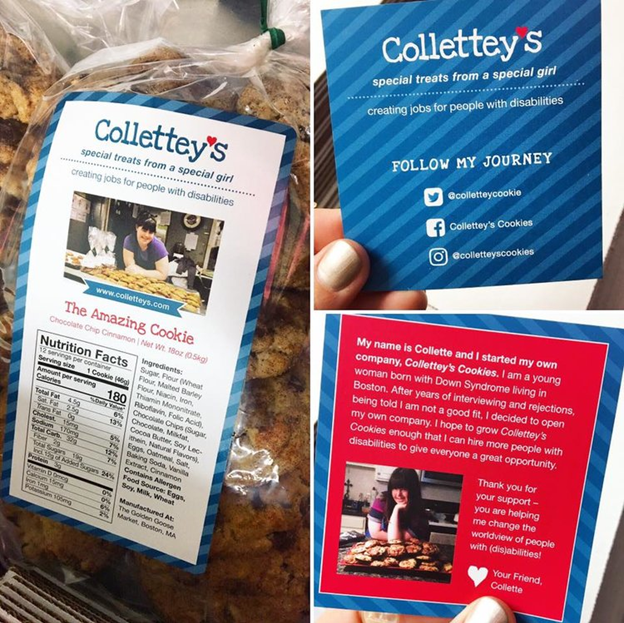
- The packaging of the "Amazing Cookie" from Collettey's Cookies
- Born: 4 October 1990 (age 35)
- Occupations: Entrepreneur and disability rights activist
- Known for: Founder of Collettey's Cookies

Collette Divitto (born October 4, 1990) is an entrepreneur and disability rights activist based in Boston, Massachusetts. She is the founder of Collettey's Cookies.

== Early life ==
Divitto has Down syndrome. She graduated from Clemson University in South Carolina in 2013.

== Career ==
Collettey's Cookies was founded in 2015, with help from her mother Rosemary Alfredo and sister Blake, after failing to find paid employment. Her first retail account was Golden Goose Market, a store in her neighborhood, the North End. The store was selling 100 bags of Collettey's Cookies within the first week. After a TV news segment about the company in the winter of 2016, which was amplified via social media, sales increased. In 2018, represented the Massachusetts Down Syndrome Congress at the United Nations as a star ambassador.

== See also ==
- List of people with Down syndrome
- Supported employment
- National Disability Employment Awareness Month
- Self-employment
- Employment discrimination

== External sources ==
- Collette Divitto's Facebook profile
- Facebook page for Collettey's Cookies
- Website for Collettey's Cookies
- Twitter account for Collettey's Cookies (featuring photographs of cookies, labels, Collette, and staffers) - @colletteycookie
