= Sanna Sepponen =

Finnish actress

- Born: January 1978 (age 48); Finland

Sanna Sepponen (born January 1978) is a Finnish actress. She played the character Roosa Kemppainen in the soap opera Salatut elämät from 2001 to 2004. She was also on the reality show Toisenlaiset frendit from 2010 to 2014.

Sepponen has Down syndrome. She has competed in Special Olympics alpine skiing.

== See also ==
- List of people with Down syndrome
