= FTL Moda =

- Industry: Fashion

FTL Moda is a multi-purpose firm specializing in the areas of fashion shows, editorial production, showroom representation, public relations, and talent management. FTL Moda is one of the major fashion week production companies producing high-end, state-of-the-art fashion shows internationally. For instance, FTL Major was a major contributor to and have staged shows for New York Fashion Week.

In February 2016, they partnered with website Fashion Week Online to produce New York Fashion Week shows. FTL Moda intend to expand their productions with Fashion Week Online in September 2016.
