= Jiří Šedý =

Czech artist, writer and activist

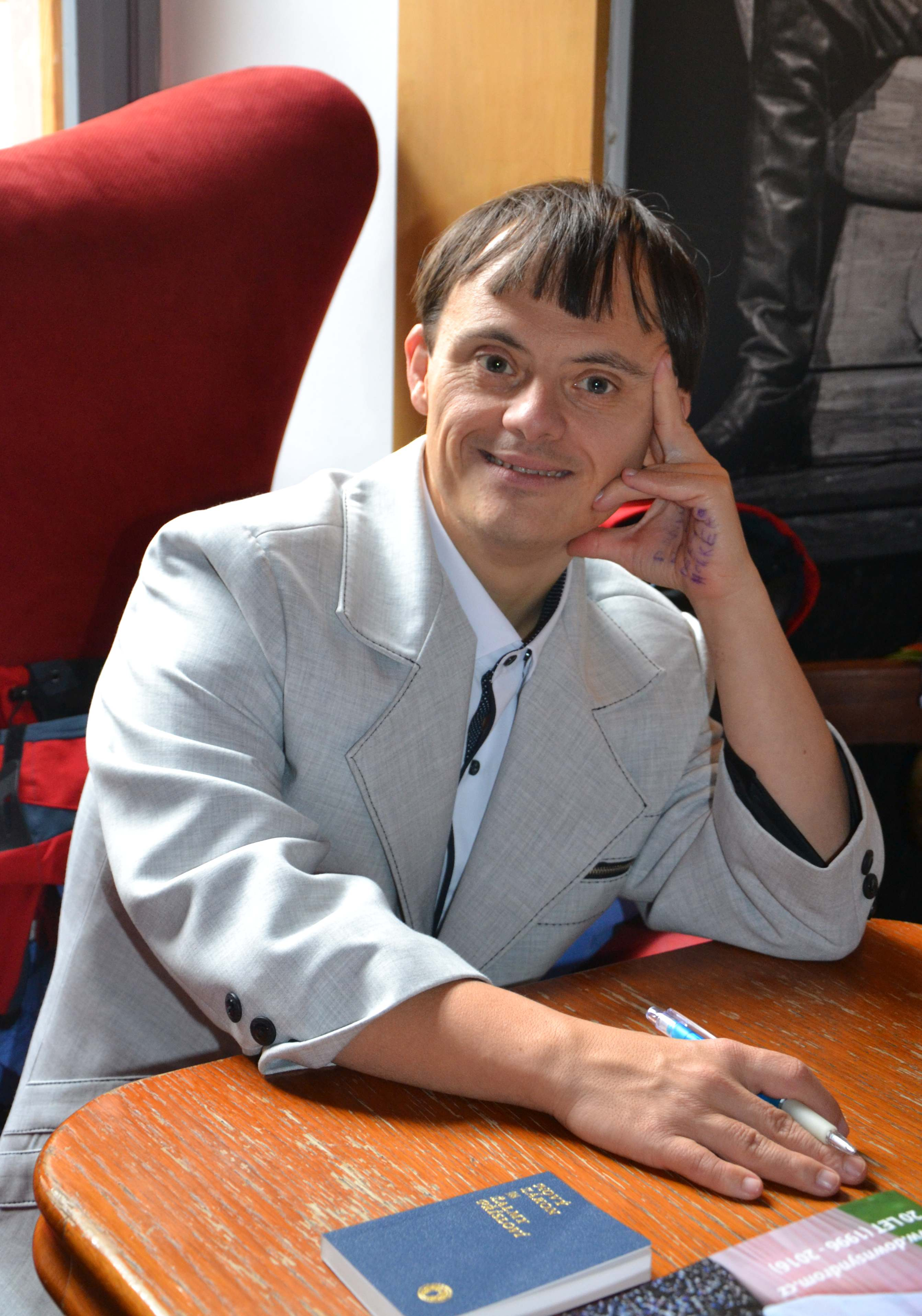
Jiří Šedý in 2016

Jiří Šedý (born 2 June 1976) is a Czech artist, writer and social activist with Down syndrome.

== Biography ==
He was born in Hlinsko, Czechoslovakia. Together with his mother, he founded the Association for Helping Disabled Children in Hlinsko. He also gives lectures on alternative art techniques and the lives of people with mental disabilities.

Recipient of several awards, he himself organized an international literary competition and award in his name, cena Jiřího Šedého "Nejsem na světě sám" (Jiří Šedý's Award "I am Not Alone in the World").

== Books ==
Illustrated by the author.

- Český myšlení / Czech Thinking (2000)
- Trochu něhy / A Little Tenderness (2000) – touching stories about children with various types of disabilities and animals
- Citlivost barevného slunce / The Sensitivity of the Colored Sun (2002) – reflective stories about human qualities
- Dominčiny pohádky / Dominika's Fairy Tales (2002) – fairy tales about nature for niece Dominika
- Babiččiny pohádky / Grandma's Fairy Tales (2005) – fairy tales about flowers
- Hledání / Searching (2006) – reflections on life for writer Květa Legátová
- Duhové pohádky / Rainbow Fairy Tales (2007) – cheerful fairy tales about colors and mushrooms, dedicated to niece Šárka
- Podivuhodná planeta / Wonderful Planet (2009) – travel stories
- Vesmírné příběhy / Space Stories (2013) – science fiction
- Perla podmořského světa / The Pearl of the Underwater World (2016) – stories about the sea
- Nezabít v nás Mozarta / Don't Kill Mozart in Us (2018) – reflective stories, the book won the Government Committee Award in 2018, dedicated to the memory of Olga Havlová
- Záblesk času / A Flash of Time (2019) – autobiographical memories of childhood, a book dedicated to sister Leona

== Filmography ==
- Bleděmodrý svět, O jeden chromozom navíc, Červíček v hlavě, Hledám práci, zn. mám Downův syndrom, Přesně tak, Na vlastní oči, Áčko

== Awards ==
- 2002: Olga Havlová Award, "for his assistance in the upbringing and education of children with mental disabilities and for his literary work"
- 2008: Best male role award at The Mental Power Prague Film Festival in film Přesně tak
- 2010: World Down Syndrome Day Award
- 2018: 3rd Prize for the book Nezabít v nás Mozarta at the 25th annual Government Committee for Persons with Disabilities Award for journalistic works
- 2020: 3rd Prize for the book Záblesk času at the 27th annual Government Committee for Persons with Disabilities Award for journalistic works

== See also ==
- List of people with Down syndrome
