= Sandra Jensen =

American disability rights activist (died 1997)

- Born: 1960 or 1961
- Died: May 9, 1997 (aged 36)
- Known for: Disability rights activist

Sandra Jensen (1960 or 1961 – May 9, 1997) was an American heart–lung transplant patient and disability rights activist. Born with Down syndrome, Jensen was initially denied a necessary transplant due to her condition. She went on to publicly advocate for transplant patients with disabilities, and ultimately received a transplant on January 3, 1996. She died of cancer the following year.

Jensen was born with Down syndrome and a defective heart, which are common comorbidities. Despite some difficulties, she was still able to live on her own and provide for herself. However, at the age of 34, Jensen's heart and lungs were compromised, and her doctor came to a conclusion that she would need a heart–lung transplant to survive.

She applied to transplant programs, but was told that they did not perform the heart–lung transplants on people with Down syndrome. In fact, no American patient with Down syndrome had ever undergone the procedure. This procedure is rare for anyone because it is extremely difficult to secure both a heart and lungs simultaneously, and only about 100 procedures a year occur. Dozens of would-be recipients each year die waiting, but Jensen's case was different because she was denied based on her disability.

Together with supporters, Jensen began a public battle to argue that Down syndrome should not automatically deprive a patient of their chance to survive. After extensive amounts of work, Jensen was approved for the requested transplant. She underwent the procedure on January 23, 1996, at Stanford University Medical Center and was released on March 1.

Her case was seen as a test of whether hospitals could use blanket categories to deny special treatments. Under the Americans with Disabilities Act, an institution can lose all of its federal funding if it is shown to have discriminated against people with disabilities. Hospitals argued that the mental limitations of Down syndrome could affect a patient's ability to follow a demanding post-operative regime; mistakes in post-operative care can be fatal. Doctors decided organs in short supply would do more good if they were given to others. Unlike many people with Down syndrome, Jensen had lived on her own for years and had held various part-time or volunteer jobs. "The whole time we were fighting with the medical establishment, all we were asking was that they look at Sandra as an individual," said Jensen's mother.

Jensen died on May 9, 1997, at the age of 36, 16 months after her heart–lung operation, from lymphoma, a type of cancer associated with the immunosuppressive medications available to prevent transplant rejection.
