= Hanli Prinsloo =

South African freediver

- Born: Cullinan, South Africa
- Occupation: Conservationist
- Organization: I Am Water
- Parent(s): Hennie and Naomi Prinsloo
- Relatives: Marieke Prinsloo-Rowe (sister)
- Awards: Six world records in free diving

Hanli Prinsloo is a South African freediver, speaker, writer and ocean conservationist. She is the founder and executive director of I Am Water, an ocean conservation trust dedicated to conserving and protecting the world's oceans through human experience. During her competitive years as a freediver, she broke eleven South African free diving records and was the first South African to hold all six free diving records simultaneously.

== Personal life ==
Prinsloo was born to parents Hennie and Naomi Prinsloo on a farm near Cullinan, South Africa, and spent her first 18 years on a horse farm outside Pretoria. Prinsloo has one sister, sculptor Marieke Prinsloo-Rowe, who works mainly in cement and often with an aquatic theme.

== Education ==
After graduating from Willowridge High School in Pretoria, Prinsloo studied dramatic studies at the University of Pretoria for one year before relocating to Gothenburg, Sweden where she studied both performing arts (Dramatik, Göteborgs Universitet) and cultural project management (Kulturverkstan). She is a qualified free-diving instructor with AIDA, and a certified yoga instructor (Sampoorna Yoga, India).

== Freediving achievements ==
While studying and working as an actress in Sweden, she was introduced to the sport of free-diving by ocean adventurer and free-diver Sebastian Näslund. In 2003 Hanli broke her first South African free-diving record and in 2006 represented South Africa at the Free-diving World Championships in Dahab, Egypt. In 2008 she broke four South African records and won the Nordic Deep Free-diving Competition. In 2010 she broke her eleventh South African record and became the first South African to hold records in all six free competitive diving disciplines simultaneously.

Free diving discipline	Measure
Constant weight	63 meters
Free immersion	52 meters
Constant weight no fins	42 meters
Dynamic apnea	150 meters
Dynamic apnea no fins	126 meters
Static apnea	5 minutes 39 seconds

== Career and accomplishments ==
In 2010, Prinsloo started working as a documentary filmmaker. In 2010, she completed a one-hour documentary film with production company Filmkreatörerna under producer Klara Björk. The film ‘White As Blood’ screened in several countries and charted a personal journey of coming home.

She has worked with an array of top athletes coaching the lessons of mental strength learned in free-diving. She has worked with trail runner Ryan Sandes, and big wave surfers including Grant "Twiggy" Baker, Chris Bertish, Frank Solomon, and Greg Long. Prinsloo worked intensively with the South African Springbok Sevens rugby team during the 2012–2013 season under coach Paul Treu.

In 2014, Prinsloo was selected as one of the World Economic Forum's Young Global Leaders.. She has worked with author James Nestor in teaching him how to freedive, which he documented his experiences with her in his book DEEP: Freediving, Renegade Science, and What the Ocean Tells Us about Ourselves.

=== I Am Water Trust ===
In 2010, her diving experiences with vulnerable marine creatures inspired her to create the I Am Water Trust in 2010 with the help of the Ewing Trust Company. I Am Water believes the well being of the humanity cannot be separated from the well being of wilderness. Prinsloo is currently the executive director of I Am Water . Working in partnership with UBS and Catlin, I Am Water has initiated ocean outreach programs in South Africa and Bermuda.
