= AfterLife (film) =

- DVD cover
- Directed by: Alison Peebles
- Written by: Andrea Gibb
- Produced by: Catherine Aitken; Ros Borland
- Starring: Lindsay Duncan; Kevin McKidd; Paula Sage; James Laurenson
- Cinematography: Grant Cameron
- Edited by: Colin Monie
- Music by: Paddy Cunneen
- Distributed by: Soda Pictures
- Release date: 19 August 2003 (Edinburgh Film Festival)
- Running time: 104 minutes
- Country: United Kingdom
- Language: English

AfterLife is a 2003 drama film set in Scotland directed by Alison Peebles and written by Andrea Gibb. It stars Lindsay Duncan, Kevin McKidd, Paula Sage, and James Laurenson. Afterlife won the Audience Award at The Edinburgh Film Festival 2003. Sage's role won her a BAFTA Scotland award for best first time performance and Best Actress in the Bratislava International Film Festival, 2004.

== Plot ==
An ambitious Scottish journalist is forced to choose between his high-flying career or caring for his younger sister who has Down's syndrome.

== Cast ==
- Lindsay Duncan as May Brogan
- Kevin McKidd as Kenny Brogan
- Paula Sage as Roberta Brogan
- James Laurenson as Professor Wilkinshaw
- Shirley Henderson as Ruby
- Fiona Bell as Lucy
- Anthony Strachan as Mike
- Emma D'Inverno as Rosa Mendoza
- Eddie Marsan as Walters Jez
- Isla Blair as Jackson, Dr
- Stuart Davids as Big Tony
- Julie Austin as Foghorn Heather
- Martin Carroll as Bingo manager
- Maureen Carr as Cissie
- Molly Innes as Social worker
- Isabelle Joss as Care home nurse
- Julie Wilson Nimmo as Hospital nurse
- Alison Peebles as Radiographer
