= Michal Šeda =

Czech ice hockey player

- Born: October 15, 1982 (age 43) Pardubice, Czechoslovakia
- Height: 6 ft 0 in (183 cm)
- Weight: 198 lb (90 kg; 14 st 2 lb)
- Position: Defenceman
- Shot: Left
- Played for: HC Pardubice; HC Košice; Scorpions de Mulhouse
- NHL draft: Undrafted
- Playing career: 2003–2023

Michal Šeda (born October 15, 1982) is a Czech former professional ice hockey defenceman. He played in the Czech Extraliga for HC Pardubice, the Slovak Extraliga for HC Košice and the Ligue Magnus for Scorpions de Mulhouse.

== Career statistics ==
			Regular season					Playoffs
Season	Team	League	GP	G	A	Pts	PIM	GP	G	A	Pts	PIM
1999–00	TJ SC Kolín U20	Czech U20 2	21	0	4	4	14	—	—	—	—	—
1999–00	HC Pardubice U20	Czech U20	12	0	0	0	4	2	0	0	0	0
2000–01	HC Pardubice U20	Czech U20	47	1	4	5	22	7	1	2	3	6
2001–02	HC Pardubice U20	Czech U20	38	2	10	12	14	2	0	1	1	0
2001–02	HC Šumperští Draci	Czech2	2	0	0	0	0	—	—	—	—	—
2002–03	HC Pardubice U20	Czech U20	35	1	10	11	20	—	—	—	—	—
2003–04	HC Prostějov	Czech2	37	0	8	8	45	—	—	—	—	—
2004–05	HC Hradec Králové	Czech2	26	1	3	4	41	3	0	1	1	0
2005–06	HC Hradec Králové	Czech2	43	1	16	17	22	9	1	2	3	4
2006–07	HC Pardubice	Czech	47	3	1	4	42	16	0	0	0	6
2006–07	HC Hradec Králové	Czech2	9	1	2	3	16	—	—	—	—	—
2007–08	HC Pardubice	Czech	32	1	1	2	38	—	—	—	—	—
2008–09	HC Pardubice	Czech	28	0	2	2	18	—	—	—	—	—
2008–09	HC Hradec Králové	Czech2	1	0	0	0	2	—	—	—	—	—
2008–09	HC Chrudim	Czech2	19	2	2	4	26	2	0	0	0	4
2009–10	HC Pardubice	Czech	10	0	0	0	8	—	—	—	—	—
2009–10	HC Chrudim	Czech2	14	0	4	4	12	—	—	—	—	—
2009–10	HC Kosice	Slovak	26	6	7	13	34	16	2	2	4	24
2010–11	HC Kosice	Slovak	52	0	9	9	75	14	2	1	3	43
2011–12	HC Kosice	Slovak	55	1	17	18	52	16	0	3	3	12
2012–13	HC Kosice	Slovak	40	2	8	10	20	17	1	1	2	10
2013–14	HC Kosice	Slovak	52	0	4	4	20	13	0	0	0	2
2014–15	HC Kosice	Slovak	52	0	4	4	28	17	0	0	0	8
2015–16	HC Dynamo Pardubice	Czech	45	2	1	3	43	—	—	—	—	—
2016–17	Scorpions de Mulhouse	France2	24	5	16	21	14	8	0	4	4	4
2017–18	Scorpions de Mulhouse	Ligue Magnus	40	1	3	4	32	6	0	1	1	10
2018–19	Scorpions de Mulhouse	Ligue Magnus	43	1	7	8	59	—	—	—	—	—
2019–20	HC Spartak Choceň	Czech4	22	8	20	28	10	9	1	2	3	6
2021–22	HC Spartak Choceň	Czech4	—	—	—	—	—	—	—	—	—	—
2022–23	HC Spartak Choceň	Czech4	21	6	15	21	6	5	0	2	2	4
Czech totals			162	6	5	11	149	—	—	—	—	—
Czech2 totals			151	5	35	40	164	—	—	—	—	—
Slovak totals			277	9	49	58	229	93	5	7	12	99
