= Standby Equity Distribution Agreement =

Financing agreement

In corporate finance, a Standby Equity Distribution Agreement (SEDA) is a type of share allocation agreement between a company and a share purchaser. It is a form of private placement. A SEDA offers a relatively flexible way of raising capital, allowing companies to further customize their approach to capital and risk management. In a sense, SEDA is similar to a line of credit extended by a lender, except that the financing is done not through debt but through equity.

In a SEDA contract, a publicly traded company arranges to raise additional capital by selling new stock without making a public seasoned equity offering. A financial entity agrees to privately purchase a defined maximum of shares to be offered in specified lots (tranches) over a specified period. The purchaser gets the stock at a discount to the current market price (often 5 percent) and the SEDA usually specifies a maximum stock price which the purchaser agrees to pay. If the company finds that it never needs more funds, it can elect not to sell any shares at all, or to sell only a part of the maximum. The timing of sales is under the control of the company, so it can sell when it believes its share price is high. The SEDA allocation increases the number of the company's shares outstanding and its total shareholders' equity, while diluting the equity of the existing shareholders.

== See also ==
- Share allocation
- Seasoned equity offering
