= Heidi Crowter =

British disability rights advocate

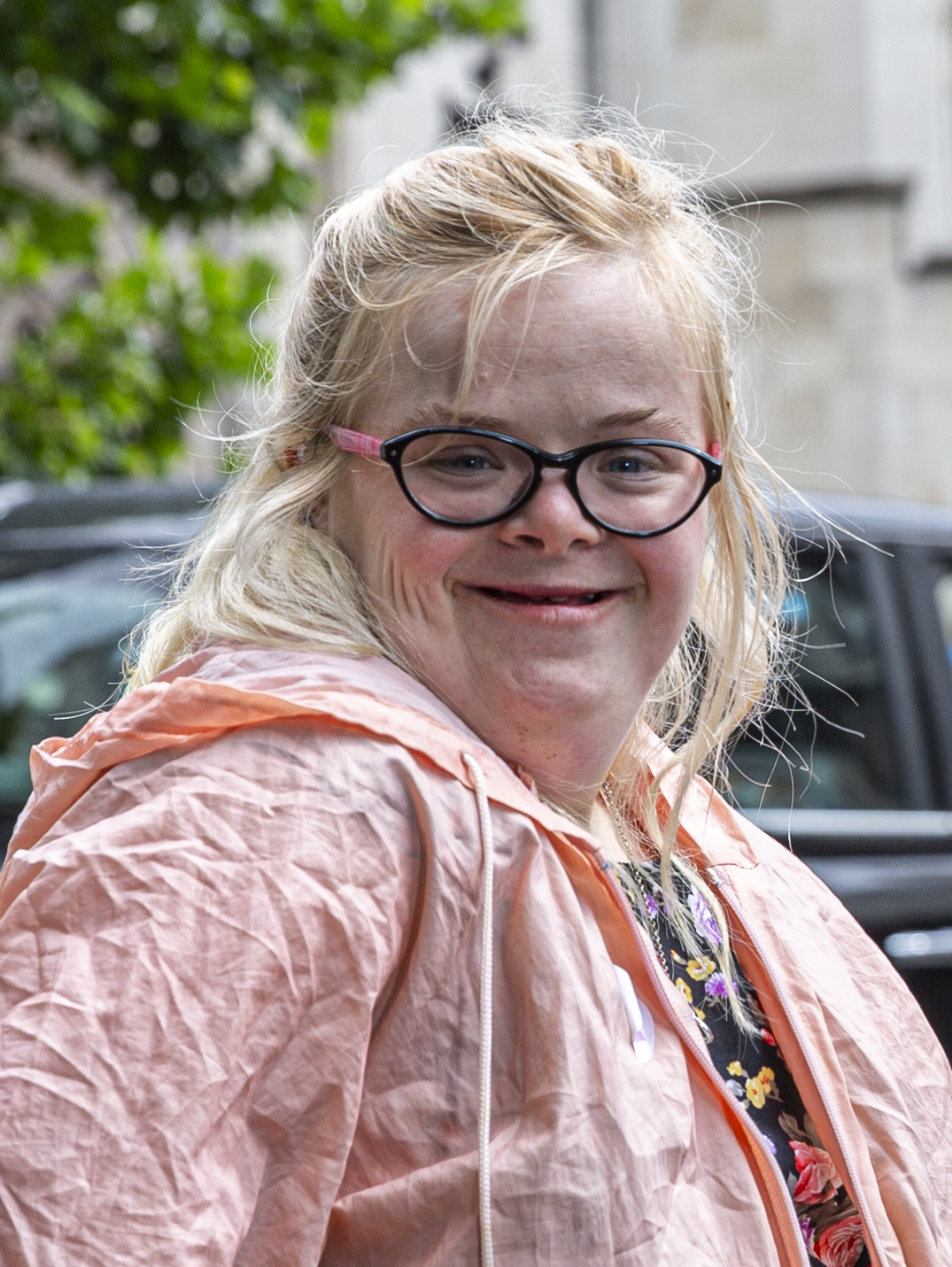
- Crowter in 2021
- Born: Coventry, England, UK
- Occupation: Disability rights advocate

Heidi Crowter is an English disability rights advocate. Crowter campaigns for the anti-abortion group Don't Screen Us Out, challenging the Abortion Act 1967 which she views as discriminatory against foetuses with disabilities.

== Early life ==
Heidi Crowter was born to Liz and Steve Crowter. Soon after her birth, her parents discovered she had Down syndrome. Crowter has had leukemia, pneumonia, and kidney failure. She had cardiac surgery shortly after her birth. Crowter has two older brothers and a younger sister. At the age of 16, Crowter was a victim of internet trolling and harassment related to her Down syndrome.

== Career ==
Crowter worked at a hair salon in Coventry managing its social media accounts and working with children.

Crowter is involved in the campaign Don't Screen Us Out. Crowter and two others sued the Department of Health and Social Care alleging that the Abortion Act 1967 was discriminatory by allowing for the abortion of foetuses with Down syndrome and other diagnoses until the time of birth. In September 2021, the case was rejected by judges. In March 2022 Crowter was given permission to appeal the verdict on limited grounds. Her appeal was unanimously dismissed in November 2022.

Crowter was honored as one of the BBC 100 Women in December 2022.

== Personal life ==
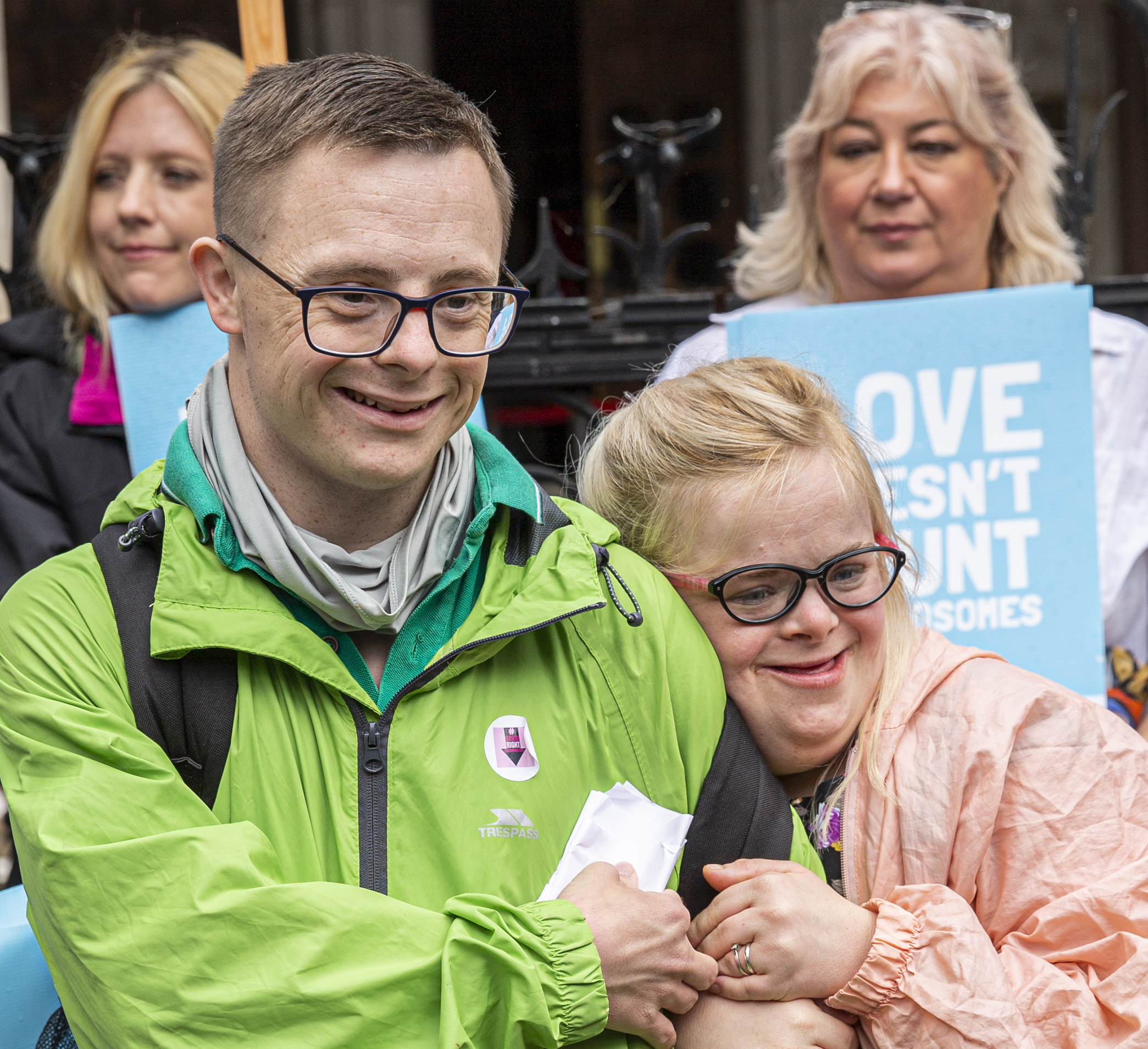
James Carter and Heidi Crowter in July 2021

Crowter is a Christian. She met her future husband, James Carter, online in 2017. They were engaged in 2018. In 2020, Crowter married James Carter at Hillfields Church in Coventry.
