= Madeline Stuart =

Australian model with Down syndrome (born 1996)

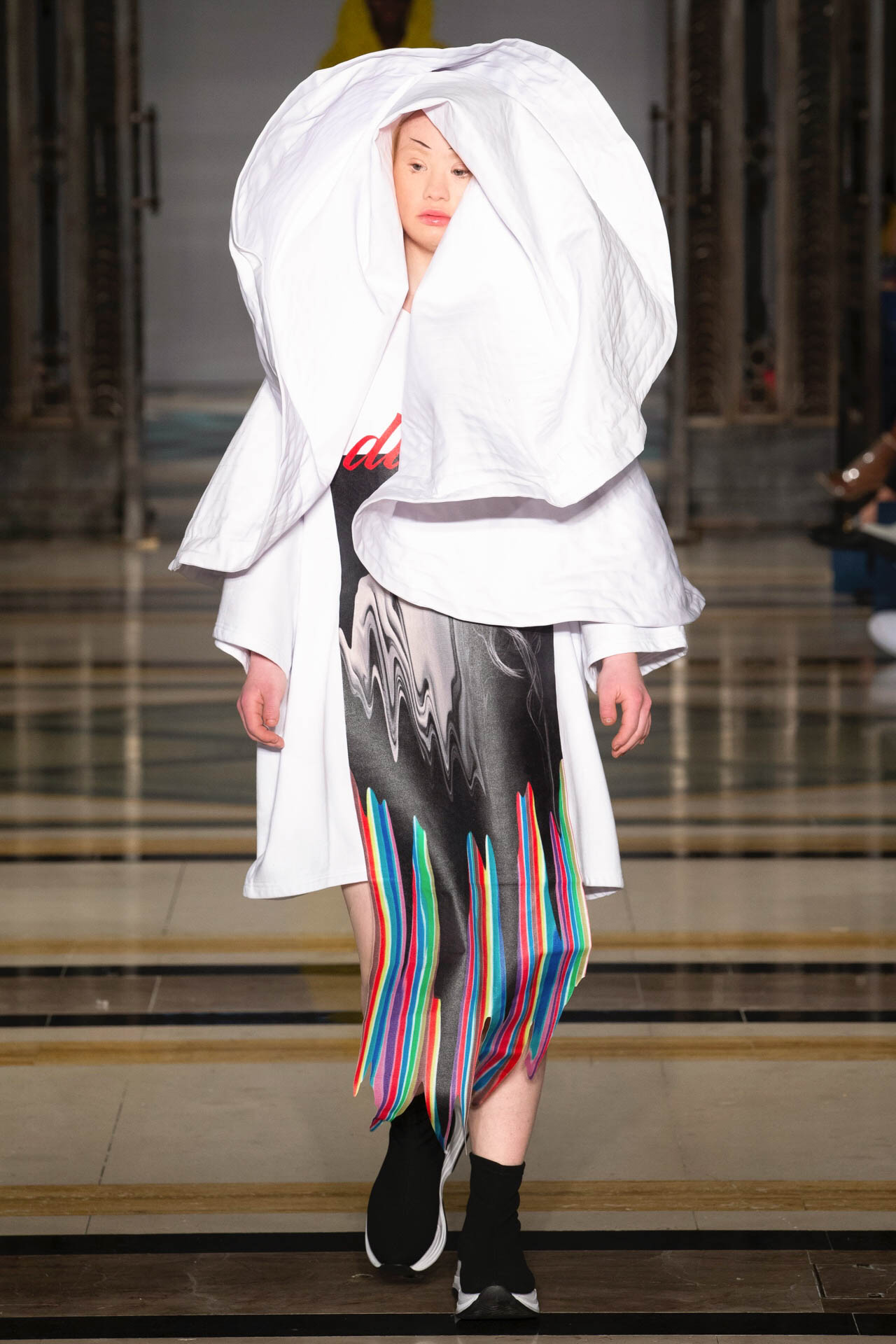
- Stuart in 2018
- Born: 13 November 1996 (age 29); Brisbane, Queensland, Australia
- Occupation: Model
- Years active: 2015-present
- Parent: Rosanne Stuart
- Modeling information
- Hair color: Strawberry blonde
- Eye color: Blue
- Agency: Madeline Stuart Management
- Website: www.madelinestuartmodel.com

Madeline Stuart (born 13 November 1996) is an Australian model with Down syndrome. She has appeared on the New York Fashion Week catwalk, and has also walked Paris fashion week, London fashion week, Runway Dubai, Russian fashion week, Mercedes Benz fashion week China and many more. She has been described as the world's first professional model with Down syndrome.

Stuart decided that she wanted to be a model upon visiting a fashion show in Brisbane with her mother in 2014. She lost 44 pounds (20 kg) and then attended a photoshoot. Stuart's career began in 2015, when her mother started an online campaign in order to secure her a modelling contract. This led to Stuart gaining a large online following and signing two modelling contracts: one with the fitness-wear brand Manifesta and one with the handbag brand everMaya. She subsequently took part in a bridal photoshoot for Rixey Manor in Virginia, and appeared in Vogue.

== Early life ==
Madeline was born in Brisbane, Australia. When she was born, doctors informed Rosanne Stuart, Madeline's mother, that Madeline had Down Syndrome (Trisomy 21). After going into heart failure at 10 days old, Madeline had heart surgery weeks later. After she was born, doctors told Rosanne that her daughter would have a difficult lifestyle. Despite receiving negative feedback from the medical community, Rosanne was committed to helping Madeline live life to the fullest. Her modelling career began when she was 18 years old. Her love of modelling began in 2014, after attending a fashion parade with her mother Rosanne and said to her “mum me model”. Rosanne knew it would take a lot of work and dedication, and told Madeline if she wanted to commit to the journey, she would fully support her, which lead to Madeline dedicating herself to becoming a model and making her dreams come true. She struggled with her weight for a long time, and in early 2015 she decided to get healthy and chase after her dreams which included dance and lost over 20 kg. After posting a transformation photo on Facebook, she went viral and gained over 100,000 followers overnight. For the six consecutive seasons since, she has walked on some of the world's most famous runways in New York, Paris, London, Dubai and more. And in 2017, Forbes named Madeline number one for Diversity in the Fashion Industry.

== Career ==
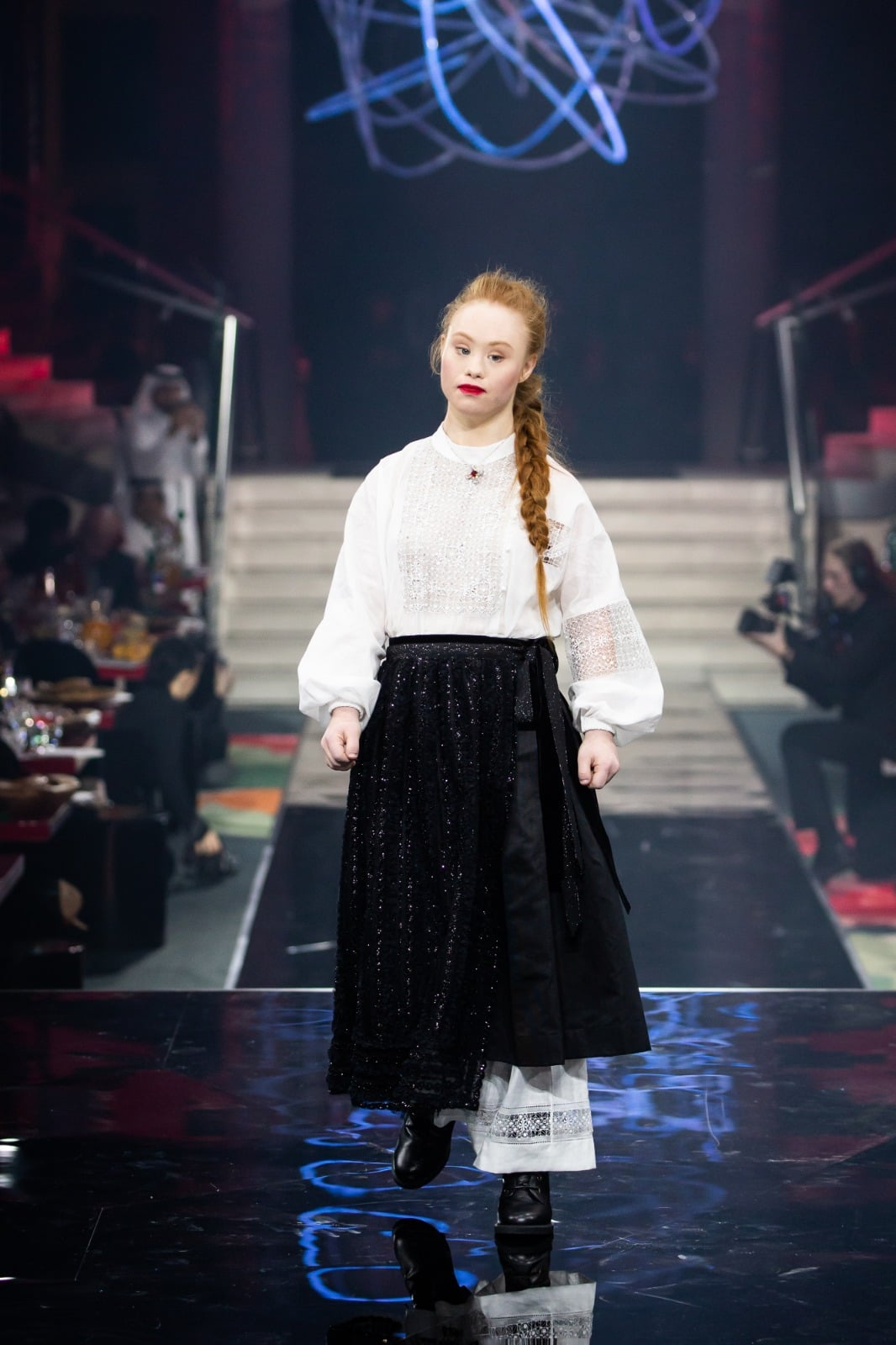
Madeline walking down the runway

Stuart's career began in 2015 when Madeline Stuart first walked a catwalk show at the New York Fashion Week, she made international news becoming the first ever professional adult model with Down's Syndrome. She launched her own fashion label, 21 Reasons Why by Madeline Stuart at New York Fashion Week. She is also an advocate of the disability community in Australia and overseas and was nominated for the Pride of Australia and Young Australian of the Year Award in 2015, 2016 and 2017. In 2016 she opened Birmingham Fashion Week. Internationally Madeline was awarded the Advocacy Award for her work in Uganda from Kulture City in 2017, and received the Quincy Jones Exceptional Advocacy Award from Global Down Syndrome in 2018. Madeline supports charity organisations from Veteran Affairs, Special Olympics, Melange, and Step Up for Downs in America. She is also the founder and ambassador for Inside Outside Dance in Brisbane, which supports young people with disabilities who want to join the dance industry.

== Awards and recognition ==
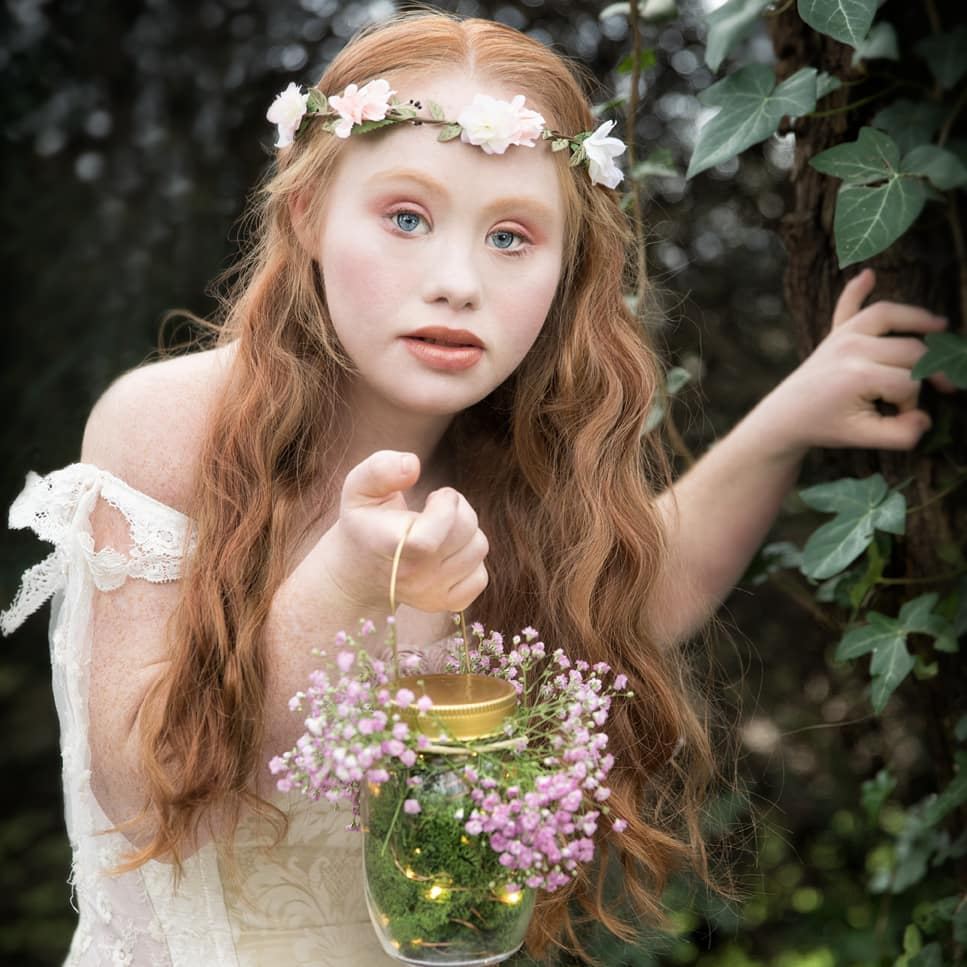

Madeline is the brand ambassador for Australian Foundation for Disability, Art Hearts Fashion, Wouldn't Change a thing and the Brisbane Disability Expo. She was Invited by Down Syndrome association, Albania and by Cairns Businesswomen's Club as a guest speaker. She was nominated for the Pride of Australia and Young Australian of the Year Award in 2015, 2016 and 2017. Internationally Madeline was awarded the Advocacy Award for her work in Uganda from Kulture City in 2017, and received the Quincy Jones Exceptional Advocacy Award from Global Down Syndrome in 2018.

== See also ==
- List of people with Down syndrome
