= Killing of Kevin McDaid =

British murder victim

Kevin Brendan McDaid (1960 – 24 May 2009) was a community worker in Coleraine, Northern Ireland who was killed by a mob outside his home on 24 May 2009. The Police Service of Northern Ireland said the attack was sectarian. His wife Evelyn was also attacked, as was a pregnant woman who pleaded with the attackers. Evelyn McDaid subsequently appealed for no retaliation to be taken, pointing out that her husband would not want this and that theirs was a mixed marriage – he was Catholic, she Protestant. Their neighbour Damien Fleming was also attacked and was hospitalised in a coma.

== Investigation ==
In June 2009, police told the High Court that they suspected that members of the UDA were involved in the killing, with the judge concluding that there were "sectarian overtones" to the attack.

Ten people have been arrested in connection with his death. A court was told that twenty people received death threats after the murder, half of those threatened being witnesses.

Damien Fleming recovered sufficiently from his injuries to be allowed home, but was attacked again and is considering leaving Coleraine.

In August 2009 the McDaid family home was one of two that were attacked.

In February 2010 eleven people had been charged with Kevin McDaids' murder, all of them barred by court order from Coleraine.

In April 2010 a man was charged with the murder of Kevin McDaid. The accused denied the charge, was released on bail of £500 and ordered to report to police twice a week.

In January 2014 nine people were jailed for their involvement in the death of Kevin McDaid, although they eventually ended up being jailed for the lesser offences of manslaughter and attempted murder in June 2014.
