= Zack Gottsagen =

American actor, musician and baseball player

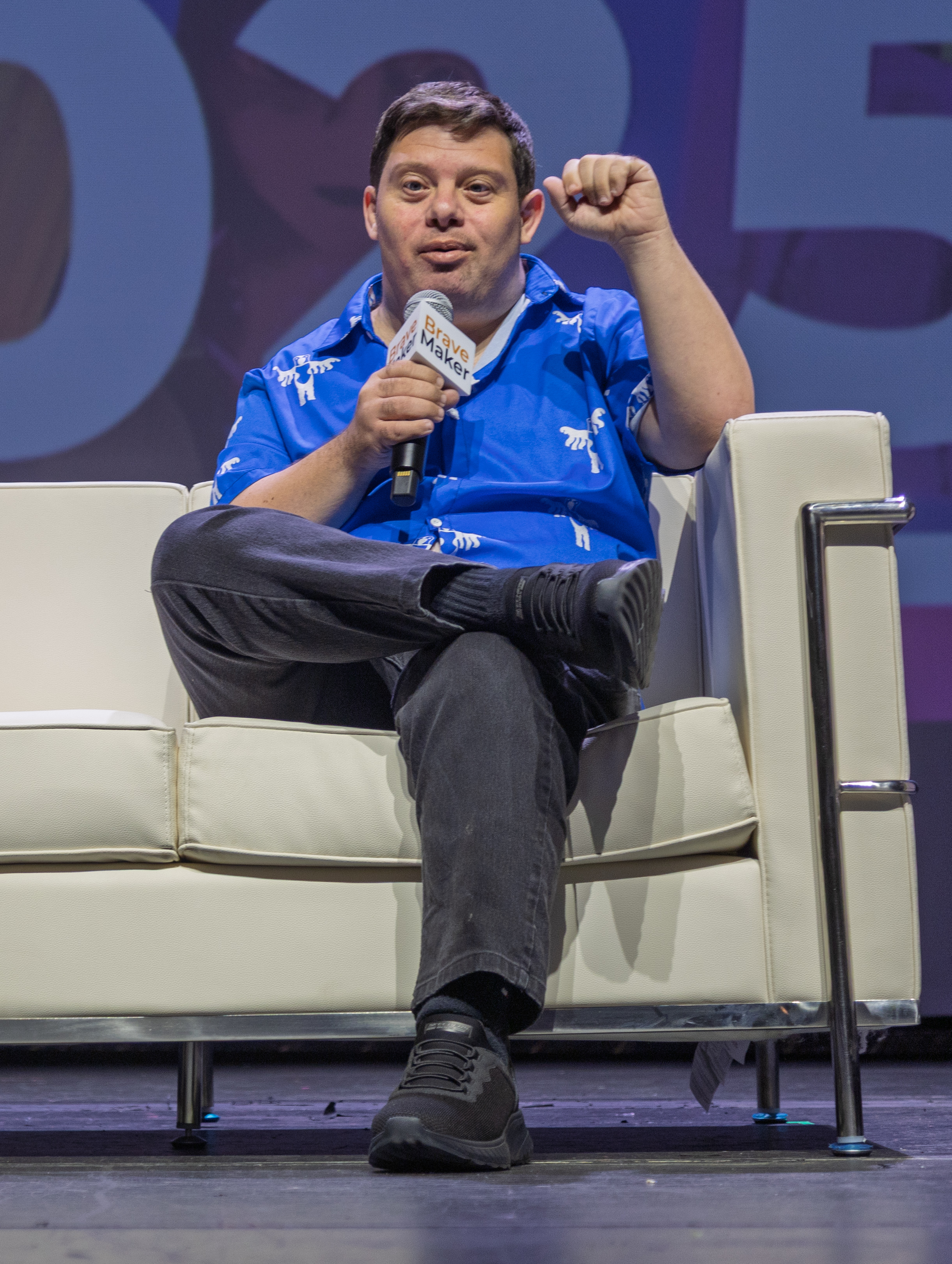
- Gottsagen at the BraveMaker Film Festival in 2025
- Born: Zachary Robin Gottsagen; April 22, 1985 (age 41); United States
- Occupation: Actor
- Years active: 2012–present

Zachary Robin Gottsagen (born April 22, 1985) is an American actor and rapper. He was born with Down Syndrome. He had a breakout role for the film The Peanut Butter Falcon.

== Career ==
His screen debut happened as an infant in an instructional film on natural childbirth.

While at Zeno Mountain Farm, a camp for people with and without disabilities, Gottsagen met Tyler Nilson and Michael Schwartz. At his request for them to make a film with him as the star, Nilson and Schwartz wrote and directed The Peanut Butter Falcon. In the film, Gottsagen had a starring role as an aspiring professional wrestler with Down syndrome.

In 2020, Gottsagen became the first person with Down Syndrome to be a presenter at the Academy Awards, when he and Shia LaBeouf presented the Academy Award for Best Live Action Short Film at the 92nd Academy Awards. In 2019, he was recognized as a Breakthrough Entertainer by the Associated Press.

Gottsagen starred with Felicity Huffman in an ABC television pilot based on the life of Susan Savage, owner of the minor league baseball team the Sacramento River Cats.

== Personal life ==
Gottsagen lives independently at an apartment in Boynton Beach, Florida. He is in a long term relationship with Charlotte Woodward, a sociologist and disability rights advocate.

== Filmography ==
=== Film ===
Year	Title	Role	Notes
2012	Bulletproof (short)	Gar Vunderson / Grimm Jim	
2014	Becoming Bulletproof (documentary)	self	
2019	The Peanut Butter Falcon	Zak	
2020	Best Summer Ever	Cheerleader	
2025	Night Always Comes	Kenny	

== Awards and nominations ==
Year	Award	Work	Result	Ref.
2020	Palm Springs International Film Festival Rising Star Award	The Peanut Butter Falcon	Won	
2020	Hollywood Critics Association Newcomer Award	The Peanut Butter Falcon	Won	
