= Jay Beatty =

Supporter of Celtic Football Club

- Born: 23 December 2003 (age 22); County Armagh, Northern Ireland
- Known for: unofficial mascot of Celtic Football Club

Jay Beatty (born 23 December 2003) is a supporter and the unofficial mascot of Celtic Football Club.

He received attention thanks to Celtic player Giorgios Samaras and was an ambassador, in 2016, for the Celtic F.C. Foundation charity. He became known as a superfan and received support and recognition from other football clubs and their fans.

On 11 May 2014, he was picked up by Samaras and carried around the pitch in front of 52,400 supporters at Celtic Park. Beatty stayed with Samaras while Samaras gave his interviews, and Beatty rubbed Samaras' beard. Celtic manager Neil Lennon gave Beatty his league winners' medal.

== Celtic involvement ==
In July 2013, before a Champions League qualifier match in Belfast against Cliftonville, Beatty was invited to join Celtic on the team bus after training with them that day. He sang "Hail Hail the Celts are here" with the first team players.

In January 2015 Beatty was invited by Hamilton Academical Football Club to watch them play Celtic. At half time, he was invited onto the pitch and was given the chance to take a penalty. Beatty scored and celebrated with both sets of fans. Beatty's goal at Hamilton was later included in the SPFL's "Goal of the Month" contest. He received 97% of all votes, beating all the professional players nominated for goals in the same month (January 2015). He was told that he had won by Georgios Samaras, via a video link from Saudi Arabia.

On 23 December 2015 he received a video that included birthday wishes from past and present Celtic players and the Celtic management team.

== Other recognition ==
In 2015, Beatty had two songs written for and about him, as well as social media pages dedicated to him. Wee Jay Celtic Bhoy was written and performed by Jim Scanlan of the Celtic band Charlie and the Bhoys and went into the Easy Listening Top 100 charts on iTunes. Little Jay was written and performed by Patrick McDaid.

== Awards ==
- Humanity and Sensitivity Award (Athens).
- Spirit of Northern Ireland Award.
- Crowned Sporting Hero at the Scottish Daily Record Our Heroes Awards. 2015. He was joint winner with Maria Lyle.
- Appointed an ambassador for Celtic F.C.

== Personal life ==
Beatty is involved with the Charity Down's & Proud which his parents set up to help educate parents of children with Down's syndrome in 2013. He lives in County Armagh, Northern Ireland.
