= The Peanut Butter Falcon =

2019 comedy-drama film directed by Tyler Nilson and Michael Schwartz

- Theatrical release poster
- Directed by: Tyler Nilson; Michael Schwartz
- Written by: Tyler Nilson; Michael Schwartz
- Produced by: Albert Berger; Christopher Lemole; Lije Sarki; David Thies; Ron Yerxa; Tim Zajaros
- Starring: Shia LaBeouf; Dakota Johnson; John Hawkes; Zack Gottsagen; Thomas Haden Church
- Cinematography: Nigel Bluck
- Edited by: Kevin Tent; Nathaniel Fuller
- Music by: Zachary Dawes; Noam Pikelny; Jonathan Sadoff; Gabe Witcher
- Production companies: Armory Films; Lucky Treehouse; Bona Fide Productions; Endeavor Content
- Distributed by: Roadside Attractions
- Release dates: March 9, 2019 (SXSW); August 9, 2019 (United States)
- Running time: 98 minutes
- Country: United States
- Language: English
- Budget: $6.2 million
- Box office: $23.7 million

The Peanut Butter Falcon is a 2019 American independent Southern Gothic buddy comedy drama film written and directed by Tyler Nilson and Michael Schwartz, in their directorial film debut, and starring Zack Gottsagen, Shia LaBeouf, Dakota Johnson, John Hawkes, and Thomas Haden Church. The plot follows a young man with Down syndrome who escapes from an assisted living facility and befriends a wayward fisherman on the run. As the two men form a rapid bond, a social worker attempts to track them. Filming took place in North Carolina and Georgia.

The film premiered at South by Southwest on March 9, 2019, and was given a limited theatrical release in the United States on August 9, 2019, by Roadside Attractions. The film grossed over $23 million, making it the highest grossing independent film of the year, and received positive reviews.

== Plot ==
Zak, a young man with Down syndrome, escapes from a state-run care facility with the help of his elderly roommate, to train as a professional wrestler under the tutelage of his hero, the Salt Water Redneck. Meanwhile, Tyler, a man fired for bringing in illegal crab catches, burns the gear of his rivals, Duncan and Ratboy, and flees himself.

While on the run, Zak and Tyler meet, and embark on a journey to the Salt Water Redneck's wrestling school in North Carolina. Zak's caretaker at the nursing home, Eleanor, sets out to find Zak and return him safely to the facility. Zak and Tyler become friends while traveling. Tyler teaches Zak various life skills, including how to use a shotgun, and eventually takes on the role of his coach, getting him in shape for his wrestling endeavors. They build a raft and begin traveling by water. Eleanor soon finds them, but after learning her boss intends to send Zak to a more severe form of confinement in an adult mental institution, joins them to travel south. That night, Duncan and Ratboy catch up with the trio, set their raft and supplies on fire, and threaten to shoot Tyler in the hand with a revolver, but Zak defends them with a shotgun.

When they reach Ayden, North Carolina, Tyler learns that the Salt Water Redneck has retired and closed the school, but convinces him to resurrect his alter ego for Zak. Salt Water trains Zak as a wrestler, and quickly puts Zak on a local fight card, which he believes he has rigged for Zak's safety and success. However, when the fight happens, Zak's opponent, Sam, does not hold back, and proceeds to beat him. As Tyler attempts to intervene, Duncan and Ratboy arrive, and Duncan hits Tyler on the head with a tire iron, knocking him unconscious right as Zak manages to lift Sam overhead and throw him forcefully out of the ring, something Salt Water had told him was impossible. The film ends with Tyler healing from the injury, as Eleanor drives him and Zak to Florida, implying the start of a new life for the three of them as a family.

== Cast ==
- Shia LaBeouf as Tyler
- Dakota Johnson as Eleanor
- John Hawkes as Duncan
- Bruce Dern as Carl
- Zack Gottsagen as Zak
- Rob Thomas as Winkie
- Jon Bernthal as Mark
- Thomas Haden Church as Clint / The Salt Water Redneck
- Yelawolf as Ratboy
- Jake Roberts as Sam
- Mick Foley as Jacob
- Wayne Dehart as Jasper John
- Dylan Odom as Wrestler (uncredited)

== Production ==
The film is a modern retelling of the Huckleberry Finn story, which takes Gottsagen's own desire to be an actor and changes it into a quest to become a wrestler. Nilson and Schwartz met Gottsagen at a camp for actors with disabilities around 2011 in Venice, California, and he expressed interest in them making a film with him. After shooting a $20,000 proof-of-concept video, with producer David Thies, the duo received funding for the film to star Gottsagen. Shia LaBeouf, Dakota Johnson and Bruce Dern joined the cast for the film in June 2017. In July 2017, production began in Georgia. Later that month, John Hawkes, Jon Bernthal, Thomas Haden Church, Mick Foley, Jake Roberts and Yelawolf joined the cast of the film.

=== Music ===
Schwartz and Nilson wanted to play the music that inspired them while writing, and on set used a boombox to play the same music before performing a scene. The soundtrack brings together bluegrass, folk songs, and spirituals, for a mix of contemporary and timeless. The soundtrack contains original music composed by Zach Dawes, Jonathan Sadoff of Thenewno2, and Noam Pikelny and Gabe Witcher of Punch Brothers, as well as new and classic songs from Sara Watkins, Colter Wall, Chance McCoy of Old Crow Medicine Show, Gregory Alan Isakov, Ola Belle Reed, and the Staple Singers. They were surprised to be able to secure the rights to many of the songs they used at a fraction of the cost they expected.

== Release ==
The film premiered at South by Southwest on March 9, 2019. Shortly after, Roadside Attractions acquired distribution rights to the film, and released it in theaters on August 9, 2019.

== Reception ==
=== Box office ===
The Peanut Butter Falcon grossed $20.5 million in the United States and Canada, and $3.3 million in other territories, for a worldwide total of $23.7 million.

In its limited opening weekend on August 9, the film grossed $205,200 from 17 theaters. The studio reported that the film was number one in more than half of the theaters it played at, including "a big commercial multiplex in Salt Lake City," and locations in Los Angeles, Dallas, Charlotte, Denver and Austin, with "lots of sellouts in various markets." The film expanded wide on August 23, to 991 theaters, and grossed $3 million for the weekend, finishing 12th. It went on to become a sleeper hit, expanding the following weekend to 1,249 theaters and earning $3 million, as well as $1.1 million on Labor Day. The film grossed $115,420 in its 11th week of release, crossing the $20 million mark.

=== Critical response ===
The film was met with positive reviews. On Rotten Tomatoes, the film holds a critic approval rating of 95% based on 220 reviews, with an average rating of 7.5/10. The website's critical consensus reads, "A feelgood adventure brought to life by outstanding performances, The Peanut Butter Falcon finds rich modern resonance in classic American fiction." On Metacritic, the film has a weighted average score of 70 out of 100, based on 28 critics, indicating "generally favorable reviews". Audiences polled by CinemaScore gave the film a rare average grade of "A+," while those at PostTrak gave it an average 4.5 out of 5 stars and a 62% "definite recommend".

Peter Debruge of Variety praised the performances, saying "In Gottsagen, we get a performer who appears to be playing an earnest, unfiltered version of himself, while in LaBeouf, there are layers at play. Oddly enough, both approaches result in a kind of spontaneous unpredictability." He called the film "a feel-good niche indie with its priorities in the right place." Sheri Linden of The Hollywood Reporter wrote, "[Gottsagen's] sensibility infuses the modern-day fable with an engaging forthrightness. But the unequivocal material often sticks close to the surface, and the film built around him, for all its physical sweep, can feel constricted by obviousness."

David Ehrlich of IndieWire called it "a warm (if somewhat overcooked) dramedy" while David Fear of Rolling Stone felt that the climax veered close to magical realism.

=== Accolades ===
The film won twenty awards and received sixteen nominations:

- The Narrative Spotlight Audience Award at South by Southwest
- Audience Award for Narrative Feature and Winner for Best Narrative Feature at the Nantucket Film Festival
- Truly Moving Picture Award at the Heartland Film Festival
- Audience Choice Award and outstanding debut performance for Zack Gottsagen at Crested Butte Film Festival
- Audience Award at the Deauville Film Festival
- Rising Star Award for Zack Gottsagen at Palm Springs International Film Festival
- Ken Hanke Memorial Tar Heel Award for Tyler Nilson and Michael Schwartz from North Carolina Film Critics Association

== In other media ==
LaBeouf and Gottsagen appeared as themselves presenting Best Live Action Short Subject at the 92nd Academy Awards.
