= Afford (surname) =

Afford is an English surname. Notable people with the surname include:

- Andy Afford (born 1964), English cricketer
- Malcolm Afford (1906–1954), Australian playwright and writer
- Thelma Afford (1908–1996), Australian costume designer, actress and journalist
