= Australian Foundation for Disability =

Australian charitable organisation

- Abbreviation: AFFORD
- Formation: 1952
- Type: NGO
- Headquarters: 3 Marieanne Place, Minchinbury, New South Wales
- Location: 8 locations
- Region served: Australia
- CEO: Robin Cowdery (interim)
- Staff: 460 (approx.)
- Website: afford.com.au

Australian Foundation for Disability (AFFORD) is a not for profit Australian Disability Enterprise (ADE) that supports people living with a disability, with bases in New South Wales, Queensland and Victoria.

== History ==
Originally established as the Poliomyelitis Society in 1895 after a Poliovirus broke out in Australia and was later eradicated in 1967 thanks to a group of businessman and the CEO of Prince Henry Hospital at the time C. J. M Walters. The organisation then in 1967 was renamed the Foundation for Disabled and provided facilities for people with intellectual disabilities and physical disabilities. It was renamed the Australian Foundation for Disabled in 1988 as the organisation continued to evolve and eventually in 2001 to the Australian Foundation for Disability to where it now provides services to over 2,000 people with disabilities mainly in Western Sydney. From 2016 CEO Steve Herald has prepared afford to meet NDIS standards.

In June 2019 a client with autism and epilepsy died while in the care of Afford's group homes, the client's medical records were not held by the client management system. The company has been accused of mismanaging NDIS funding spending on corporate events, parties and cruises for its senior management staff. Parents and caregivers of families expressed their concerns. Former CEO Steve Herald submitted his resignation in March 2021, three days later he retracted his resignation citing the achievements he has made over a six-year timeframe, the appeal was denied as most of those achievements came from NDIS funding.

== Services ==
- Afford Employment:
  - Disability Employment Service
  - School Leavers Program
  - Supported Employment
- Allied Health:
  - Psychology
  - Occupation Therapy
  - Speech Therapy
- Care Services
- Community Support
- Day Programs
- Getaways
- Group Homes
- Respite
