= Kateřina Šedá =

Czech artist (born 1977)

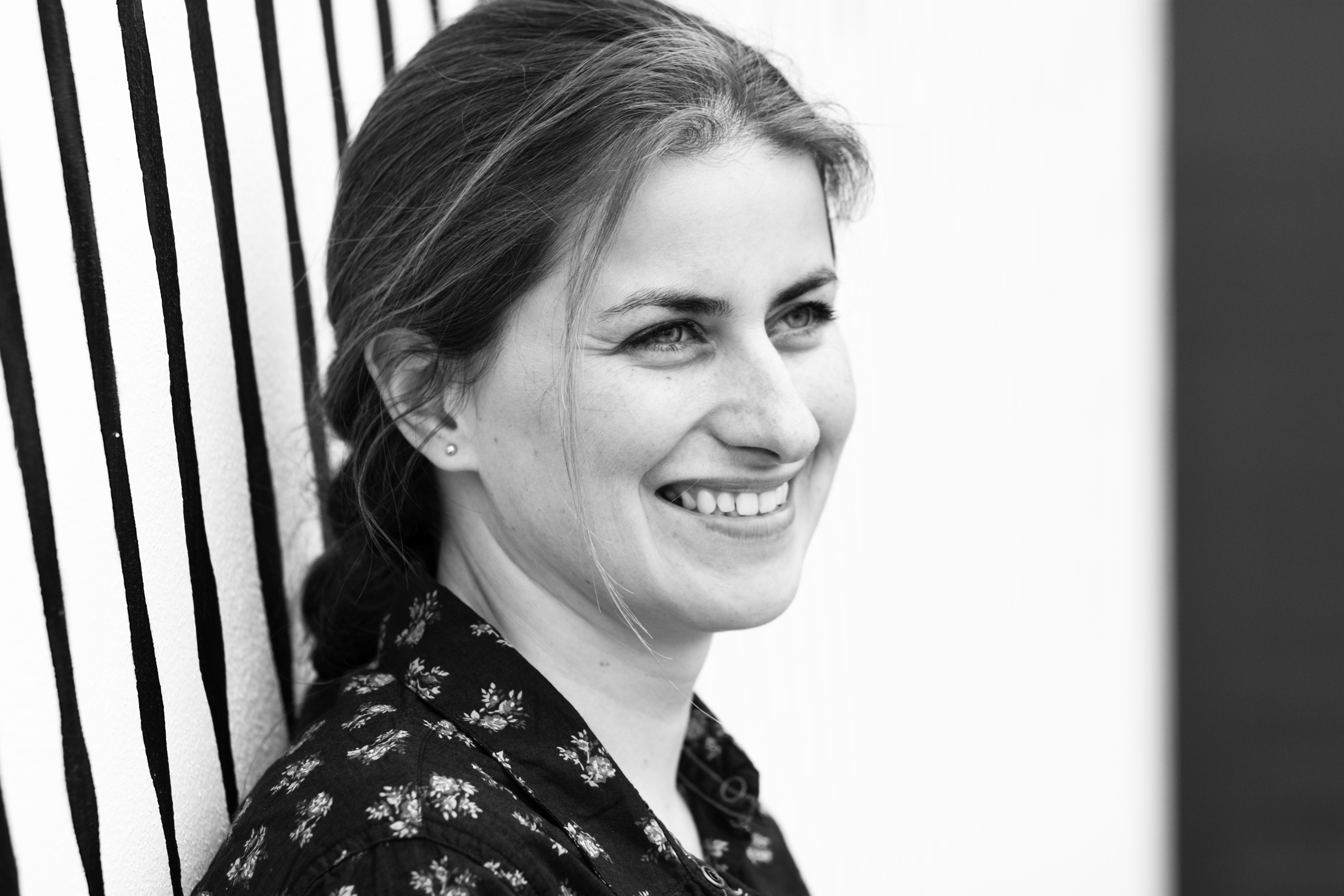
Kateřina Šedá

Kateřina Šedá (born 12 December 1977 in Brno) is a Czech artist focused on conceptual art and social art.

Šedá graduated in 2005 from the Academy of Fine Arts in Prague. In 2005, she won the Jindřich Chalupecký Award for Czech artists under 35 years of age. She was married to the filmmaker Vít Klusák. She lives and works in Prague and Brno.

Šedá has described the themes of her work as the quotidian, location, and individual storytelling, stating that "In all my public actions, I try to create an exchange between people in their everyday spaces". Her projects often involve members of her family or people from small villages and encourage communication between people, combining urban planning, everyday life, politics, and private relationships through social investigations.

== Projects ==
- There's Nothing There (2003) - Šedá asked the people in a small town in the Czech Republic to repeat their everyday rituals all at the same time together. The people of the town went to the grocery store, ate meals, and watched evening TV with their families all at the same time for a day. This project highlighted the similarities between people and how we might not realize how much of our lives intersect with others.
- Mirror Hill (2010) - Šedá asked 600 families from Mirror Hill, a community on the outskirts of Budapest, to take part in this project. Mirror Hill has no center or common meeting space and most people don't know their neighbors, so Šedá set up a competition to foster relationships between them. The families were each asked to submit a drawing of their view from their front door, and then a catalogue was distributed to all of the community members. Šedá offered a prize to the family that could correctly identify the most houses in the catalogue, and described the results: "It was amazing to see the streets full of people with their books open, looking at the buildings and searching for the houses... in the evening, they all gathered to discuss the day spent together".

== Solo exhibitions (selection) ==
- 2014: The Right side is on the left, Chatou
- 2011: The soup is eaten, Nassauischer Kunstverein Wiesbaden, September 11, 2011, to June 3, 2012, on the occasion of the Follow Fluxus scholarship.
- 2008: It does not matter, Renaissance Society, Chicago
- 2007: For every dog a different master, Galerie im Taxispalais, Innsbruck

== Group exhibitions (selection) ==
- 2009: The Generational: Younger Than Jesus, New Museum, New York City
- 2008: When things cast no shadow, the 5th Berlin Biennal, Over and Over
- 2007: documenta 12, Kassel, Every Dog A Different Master
- 2006: Speaking of Others, tranzit, Frankfurter Kunstverein, Frankfurt
- 2006: Gray Zones, Museum of Contemporary Art, Leipzig
- 2005: Prague Biennale 2, Prague
