= Auðunn Gestsson =

Icelandic newspaper salesman, poet, and painter (1938–2020)

- Born: 27 February 1938; Flatey, Kingdom of Iceland
- Died: 18 November 2020 (aged 82); Iceland
- Occupations: Newspaper salesman, poet, painter
- Notable work: Ljóðin mín

Auðunn Gestsson (27 February 1938 – 21 November 2020) was an Icelandic newspaper salesman, poet and a painter. Born with Down syndrome, he was the oldest living person in Iceland with the syndrome at the time of his death.

== Early life and career ==
Auðunn was born in Flatey, Breiðafjörður, Iceland, one of seven siblings. His mother died when he was seven years old, resulting in him being raised by his sister Gerður Gestsdóttir.

Auðunn started as a newspaper salesman around 1970 and quickly became a well known figure and fixture in downtown Reykjavík.

In 2013, he published the poetry book Ljóðin mín.
