= C7H15Cl2N2O4P =

The molecular formula C_{7}H_{15}Cl_{2}N_{2}O_{4}P (molar mass: 293.084762 g/mol) may refer to:

- Carboxycyclophosphamide
- Perfosfamide
