= Perfosfamide =

Chemical compound

Clinical data
- Other names: Perfosfamide
- Routes of administration: Extracorporal treatment of cellular masses; intravenously
- ATC code: L01

Identifiers
- IUPAC name: (2S,4S)-N,N-Bis(2-chloroethyl)-4-hydroperoxy-2-oxo-1,3,2λ^{5}-oxazaphosphinan-2-amine
- CAS Number: 39800-16-3
- PubChem CID: 38347
- ChemSpider: 35147
- UNII: U880A4FUDA
- ChEBI: CHEBI:196991
- ChEMBL: ChEMBL61511
- CompTox Dashboard (EPA): DTXSID2049058

Chemical and physical data
- Formula: C_{7}H_{15}Cl_{2}N_{2}O_{4}P
- Molar mass: 293.08 g·mol^{−1}
- 3D model (JSmol): Interactive image
- SMILES: C1COP(=O)(NC1OO)N(CCCl)CCCl
- InChI: InChI=1S/C7H15Cl2N2O4P/c8-2-4-11(5-3-9)16(13)10-7(15-12)1-6-14-16/h7,12H,1-6H2,(H,10,13)/t7-,16-/m0/s1; Key:VPAWVRUHMJVRHU-GYKQLYQFSA-N

Perfosfamide, or 4-hydroperoxycyclophosphamide (trade name Pergamid) was an experimental drug candidate for blood cancers that was rejected by the FDA in 1993 and never reached the market.

== Intended use ==
Perfosfamide was used experimentally by oncologists in the 1980s for use in bone marrow transplant procedures for treatment of blood cancers. It was added to the tissue after it had been taken from the donor but before the tissue was administered to the patient to "purge" lymphocytes in order to prevent Graft Versus Host Disease, which results from donor lymphocytes attacking normal host cells and tissues, and to "purge" a patient's own (autologous) collected hematopoietic stem cells of any malignant cells it may still contain at the time of harvesting.

In 1989 Nova Pharmaceutical took over development of the compound and in 1992, it submitted a new drug application to the FDA for using perfosamide to purge malignant cells in transplants for the treatment of acute myeloid leukemia. In the ensuing year, it merged with Scios to become Scios Nova. In March 1993, the FDA's Oncology Drugs Advisory Committee rejected the application because all the data was from the experimental uses, and no randomized clinical trial had been conducted. At the review meeting, Scios Nova also announced that it would not fund further development of the drug candidate.

== Chemistry ==
Perfosfamide is an oxazaphosphorine compound, similar to mafosfamide and cyclophosphamide. Like those compounds it, is metabolized to 4-hydroxycyclophosphamide, which eventually gives rise to the two directly cytotoxic metabolites — phosphoramide mustard and acrolein.
