= Veto cell =

Type of white blood cell

In the immune system, veto cells are white blood cells that have a selective immunomodulation properties. Veto cells were first described in 1979 as cells that "can prevent generation of cytotoxic lymphocytes by normal spleen cells against self-antigens". Hence, veto cells delete T cells that recognize the veto cells (the responding T cells are "vetoed" and thus removed from the system).

== Proposed role in homeostasis ==
The establishment and maintenance of self-tolerance is an essential property of an immune system designed to eliminate foreign substances. Avoiding self-reactivity in the T cell compartment is maintained by: clonal deletion in the thymus and suppressive cells that eliminate or induce tolerance on autoreactive lymphocytes that escaped selection. Veto activity is thought to be a form of antigen-specific suppression that maintains continuous self-tolerance. Cells with veto activity induce a state of tolerance in T cell precursors with specificity for antigen determinants expressed on the surface of the veto-active cell. This means that T-cells with a T-cell receptor specific to antigens presented on the veto cell, bind to the veto cell, and are in-turn tolerized or eliminated. Hence veto activity is selective but is not T-cell receptor mediated. Both clonal anergy and clonal deletion have been shown to operate in vetoed T cells. The veto cell need only carry the self-MHC determinant or self-MHC determinant plus antigen. Veto-induced tolerance can be established in vitro and in vivo for both MHC class I and class II as well as minor histocompatibility antigens.

== Types ==
Veto activity is a functional hallmark of a cell, it is not a specific phenotype. This means that different types of white blood cells, including non-cytotoxic cells, are capable of acting as veto cells. To name some of these cell types; CD34 cells, CD33 cells, CD8 T cells, immature dendritic cells and natural killer (NK) cells among others.

Mature activated cytotoxic CD8+ T cells are the most potent veto cells, this is perhaps related to their distinct function as killer cells which is not related to their veto activity. Subtypes of CD8+ T cells such as Central memory T-cell are also excellent veto cells.

== Mechanisms of action ==
Different veto cells possess different elimination mechanisms and tolerance induction mechanisms. Both CD34 and CD33 cells function via the TNFα pathway.

Mature activated cytotoxic CD8+ T cells vetoeing involves ligation of MHCI on the target cell by CD8 on the veto cell and killing can then be mediated via either the Fas/FASL pathway or the Perforin mediated apoptosis pathways.

BM-derived immature dendritic cells vetoeing mechanism against CD8 T cells was found to be an MHC-dependent binding followed by mediated killing that involves TLR7, and TREM1.

== Veto cells in allogeneic/haploidentical transplantation ==
Because veto cells can only suppress T-cell progenitors that are directed against antigens on the veto cells themselves, but not against third-party antigens, this specificity can be harnessed as an effective tool to create tolerance in transplantation. By isolating veto cells that express the MHC of the donor it is possible to eliminate/tolerize only T-cell precursors that recognize the donor. These are the same T-cells that mediate graft rejection. This means that the addition of donor-veto cells to the donor graft can act as a specific immunosuppressant, only eliminating the cells that mediate graft rejection, but the rest of the T cell clone (those that do not recognize the donor MHC/antigen) can provide immunity to the host normally.

CD34+ cells were serendipitously found to have veto activity when researchers were trying to solve the problem of Graft rejection of T-cell depleted Hematopoietic stem cell transplantation in leukemia patients. After this discovery a new type of transplantation - megadose transplantation - using a high number of CD34 cells was established. The large number of veto cells helped overcome the graft rejection that was mediated by the host CD8 T-cell precursors.

An alternative to isolation and transplantation of large amounts of CD34+ cells is to add other types of veto cells and transplant them along with the graft. This method is especially handy when using conditioning regimens that are not as toxic and immune depleting as traditional methods. These are called reduced intensity or non-myeloablative conditioning regimens and since these protocols do not completely abolish the immune system of the host, Graft rejection is the main problem. Addition of donor-veto cells to the graft can provide one solution to this problem.

Veto cell administration can also be used for tolerance induction to allogeneic/haploidentical solid organ grafts. This has been tested successfully in kidney transplant model in unrelated outbred rhesus monkeys. and skin transplants in mice. Other experiments have been unsuccessful.

== Anti-3rd party veto cells ==
Anti-3rd party veto cells were developed to address the need for large numbers of donor veto cells to infuse along with the graft, as a tool for the induction of donor-tolerance. These cells are produced from naive donor CD8+ cells because CD8+ cells have the best veto activity. By expanding naïve CD8 T cells against 3rd-party stimulators under cytokine deprivation, clones that are reactive against the host are eliminated due to lack of nutrients and signaling. The expression of a central memory T cell (Tcm) phenotype helps these host non-reactive veto cells reach the lymph nodes where they eradicate anti-donor T cell precursors. Transfer of these Anti-3rd party Tcm with megadose TCD HSCT in preclinical models was successful at preventing graft rejection without GVHD under reduced intensity conditioning.

== Therapy ==
Anti-3rd party veto cells can also be manipulated to become genetically engineered T cell. In this case, veto cells from an allogeneic/haploidentical donor can exert some therapeutic function while also avoiding rejection through their veto activity. One study shows that this could be an effective solution for the production of off-the-shelf CAR T cells that will not be rejected or cause GvHD.

Anti-3rd party veto cells have also been shown to have Graft-versus-tumor effect
