= T-cell depletion =

T-cell depletion (TCD) is the process of T cell removal or reduction, which alters the immune system and its responses. Depletion can occur naturally (i.e. in HIV) or be induced for treatment purposes. TCD can reduce the risk of graft-versus-host disease (GvHD), which is a common issue in transplants. The idea that TCD of the allograft can eliminate GvHD was first introduced in 1958. In humans the first TCD was performed in severe combined immunodeficiency patients.

== Depletion methods ==
T cell depletion methods can be broadly categorized into either physical or immunological. Examples of physical separation include using counterflow centrifugal elutriation, fractionation on density gradients, or the differential agglutination with lectins followed by rosetting with sheep red blood cells. Immunological methods utilize antibodies, either alone, in conjunction with homologous, heterologous, or rabbit complement factors which are directed against the T cells. In addition, these techniques can be used in combinations.

These techniques can be performed either in vivo, ex vivo, or in vitro. Ex vivo techniques enable a more accurate count of the T cells in a graft and also has the option to 'addback' a set number of T cells if necessary. Currently, ex vivo techniques most commonly employ positive or negative selection methods using immunomagnetic separation. In contrast, in-vivo TCD is performed using anti-T cell antibodies or, most recently, post-HSCT cyclophosphamide.

The method by which depletion occurs can heavily affect the results. Ex vivo TCD is predominantly used in GvHD prevention, where it offers the best results. However, complete TCD via ex vivo, especially in acute myeloid leukemia (AML), patients usually does not improve survival. In vivo depletion often uses monoclonal antibodies (eg, alemtuzumab) or heteroantisera. In haploidentical hematopoietic stem cell transplantation, in vivo TCD suppressed lymphocytes early on. However, the incidence rate of cytomegalovirus (CMV) reactivations is elevated. These problems can be overcome by combining TCD haploidentical graft with post-HSCT cyclophosphamide. In contrast, both in vivo TCD with alemtuzumab and in vitro TCD with CD34+ selection performed comparably.

Although TCD can be effective in preventing GvHD, there are several potential problematic side-effects such as a delay in recovery of the immune system of the transplanted individual or a decreased graft-versus-tumor effect. This problem is partially answered by more selective depletion, such as depletion of CD3+ or TCRα/β+ T-cells and CD19+ B cells, which preserves other important cells of the immune system. Another method is addition of cells back into the graft, after a comprehensive TCD method, examples are re-introduction of natural killer cells (NK), γδ T-cells and T regulatory cells (Tregs).

Early on it was apparent that TCD was good for preventing GvHD, but also led to increased graft rejection; this problem can be solved by transplanting more hematopoietic stem cells. This procedure is called 'megadose transplantation,' and can prevent rejection because the stem cells have the ability to protect themselves from the host's immune system (i.e. veto cell killing). Experiments show that transplantation of other types of veto cells along with megadose haploidentical HSCT reduces the toxicity of the conditioning regimen, which makes this treatment much safer and more applicable to many diseases. These veto cells can also exert graft-versus-tumor effect.

== Role in disease ==
=== In HIV ===
HIV has been confirmed to target CD4+ T cells and destroy them, making T cell depletion an important hallmark of HIV. In comparison to HIV- individuals, CD4+ T cells proliferate at a higher rate in those who are HIV+. Apoptosis also occurs more frequently in HIV+ patients.

Depletion of regulatory T cells increases immune activation. Glut1 regulation is associated with the activation of CD4+ T cells, thus its expression can be used to track the loss of CD4+ T cells during HIV.

Antiretroviral therapy, the most common treatment for patients with HIV, has been shown to restore CD4+ T cell counts.

The body responds to T cell depletion by producing an equal amount of T cells. However, over time, an individual's immune system can no longer continue to replace CD4+ T cells. This is called the "tap and drain hypothesis."

=== In cancer ===
TCD's role in cancer increasing with the rise of immunotherapies being investigated, specifically those that target self-antigens. One example is antigen-specific CD4+ T cell tolerance, which serves as the primary mechanism restricting immunotherapeutic responses to the endogenous self antigen guanylyl cyclase c (GUCY2C) in colorectal cancer. However, in some cases, selective CD4+ T cell tolerance provides a unique therapeutic opportunity to maximize self antigen-targeted immune and antitumor responses without inducing autoimmunity by incorporating self antigen-independent CD4+ T cell epitopes into cancer vaccines.

In a mammary carcinoma model, depletion of CD25+ regulatory T cells increase the amount of CD8+CD11c+PD1^{10}, which target and kill the tumors.

=== In lupus ===
Phenotypic and functional characteristics of regulatory T cells in lupus patients do not differ from healthy patients. However, depletion of regulatory T cells results in more intense flares of systemic lupus erythematosus. The in vivo depletion of regulatory T cells is hypothesized to occur via early apoptosis induction, which follow exposure to self Ags that arise during the flare.

=== In murine cytomegalovirus (MCMV) infection ===
MCMV is a rare herpesvirus that can cause disseminated and fatal disease in the immunodeficient animals similar to the disease caused by human cytomegalovirus in immunodeficient humans. Depletion of CD8+ T cells prior to a MCMV infection effectively upregulates the antiviral activity of natural killer cells. Depletion post infection has no effect on the NK cells.

=== In arthritis ===
A preliminary study of the effect on TCD in arthritis in mice models has shown that regulatory T cells play an important role in delayed-type hypersensitivity arthritis (DTHA) inflammation. This occurs by TCD inducing increased neutrofils and activity of IL-17 and RANKL.

== Treatment use ==
=== Haploidentical stem cell transplantation ===
TCD is heavily used in haploidentical stem cell transplantation (HSCT), a process in which cancer patients receive an infusion of healthy stem cells from a compatible donor to replenish their blood-forming elements.

In patients with Acute Myeloid Leukemia (AML) and in their first remission, ex vivo TCD greatly reduced the incidence rate of GvHD, though survival was comparable to conventional transplants.

=== Bone marrow transplantation ===
In allogeneic bone marrow transplants (BMT), the transplanted stem cells derive from the bone marrow. In cases where the donors are genetically similar, but not identical, risk of GvHD is increased. The first ex vivo TCD trials used monoclonal antibodies, but still had high incidence rates of GvHD. Additional treatment using complement or immunotoxins (along with anti-T-cell antibody) improved the depletion, thus increasing the prevention of GvHD. Depleting αβ T cells from the infused graft spares γδ T cells and NK cells promotes their homeostatic reconstitution, thus reducing the risk of GvHD.

In vitro TCD selectively with an anti-T12 monoclonal antibody lowers the rate of acute and chronic GvHD post allogeneic BMT. Further, immune suppressive medications are usually unnecessary if CD6+ T cells are removed from the donor marrow.

Patients can relapse even after a TCD allogeneic bone marrow transplant, though patients with chronic myelogenous leukemia (CML) who receive a donor lymphocyte infusion (DLI) can restore complete remission.
