= Jimmy V Award =

Annual athletic award

- The Jimmy V Award Trophy
- Awarded for: "A deserving member of the sporting world who has overcome great obstacles through perseverance and determination."
- Location: Dolby Theatre, Los Angeles, California (2023)
- Presented by: The V Foundation
- First award: 2007
- Currently held by: Jim Abbott
- Website: espn.com/espys

The Jimmy V Award (sometimes called the Jimmy V Award for Perseverance) is awarded as part of the ESPY Awards to "a deserving member of the sporting world who has overcome great obstacles through perseverance and determination". The award is named in honor of North Carolina State University men's basketball coach Jim Valvano, who gave an acceptance speech after receiving the Arthur Ashe Courage Award at the 1993 ESPY Awards ceremony which "brought a howling, teary-eyed Madison Square Garden to its feet". Valvano died from adenocarcinoma two months after receiving the award. The Jimmy V Award trophy, designed by sculptor Lawrence Nowlan, is presented at the annual awards ceremony in Los Angeles, California by The V Foundation, a charitable organization founded in 1993 by ESPN and Valvano to raise money to fund cancer research grants across the United States.

The accolade's inaugural winner in 2007 was basketball coach Kay Yow, who successfully led the North Carolina State University women's team to the ACC tournament championship game, and the Sweet 16 (regional semi-finals) of the NCAA Division I Tournament after returning from sessions of breast cancer chemotherapy. Although the award has usually been given to coaches or athletes, it has been presented to two reporters: Stuart Scott (2014) and Craig Sager (2016). The award has been shared twice: Team Hoyt (2013), consisting of the father and son team of Dick and Rick Hoyt, and the father and daughter combination of Devon Still and Leah Still (2015). The 2026 recipient of the Jimmy V Award was one-handed Angels and Yankees pitcher Jim Abbott.

== Recipients ==
Jimmy V Award winners
Year	Image	Recipient(s)	Notes	Ref
2007		Kay Yow	Returned to successfully coach the North Carolina State University women's team to the ACC tournament championship game, and the Sweet 16 (regional semi-finals) of the NCAA Division I Tournament after sessions of breast cancer chemotherapy.	
2008	Kevin Everett waving to the crowd in 2017	Kevin Everett	Former Buffalo Bills tight end who was paralysed from the neck down due to a spinal cord injury he sustained at the start of the 2007 NFL season but began walking again after rehabilitation.	
2009	–	Don Meyer	Meyer had his left leg amputated below the knee after a vehicular accident in September 2008. He was later diagnosed with cancer of the liver and intestines but eventually returned as coach of the Northern State Wolves men's basketball team.	
2010	George Kart coaching a basketball team in 2011	George Karl	The Denver Nuggets coach returned to work after being placed on a leave of absence to undergo radiation treatment for neck and throat cancer for six weeks.	
2011	–	Anthony Robles	Robles, born without a right leg, beat Matt McDonough in the final of the 2010–2011 NCAA Division I Wrestling Championship 125 lb category to end the season undefeated.	
2012	Eric LeGrand in 2016	Eric LeGrand	After sustaining a spinal cord injury in a 2010 game against the Army Black Knights. The Rutgers Scarlet Knights defensive tackle contradicted medical opinion by standing upright with the aid of a metal frame, and breathing without the assistance of a ventilator.	
2013	Team Hoyt participating in a marathon in 2012	Team Hoyt	Dick Hoyt pushed his son Rick, born with cerebral palsy, in a custom-built running wheelchair in more than a thousand long-distance running events for almost four decades.	
2014	Stuart Scott in 2010	Stuart Scott	The ESPN sports commentator was diagnosed with appendiceal cancer in 2007, and continued to work for the network while undergoing multiple surgeries and chemotherapy.	
2015	–	Devon Still and Leah Still	Five year-old Leah Still was diagnosed with stage four neuroblastoma, and her father, Devon, was added to the practice squad of the Cincinnati Bengals to help him afford his daughter's treatment.	
2016	Craig Sager in 2009	Craig Sager	TNT sports reporter diagnosed with acute myeloid leukemia in 2014, who kept working for the network in spite of his cancer no longer going into remission.	
2017	–	Jarrius Robertson	15-year-old "super fan" of the New Orleans Saints, born with biliary atresia, affecting his rate of growth, and forcing him to undergo two liver transplants and thirteen surgeries.	
2018	Jim Kelly in 2010	Jim Kelly	Former Buffalo Bills quarterback who survived three occurrences of squamous-cell oral cancer within five years.	
2019	–	Rob Mendez	Junior varsity high school football coach who was born without arms or legs. Since 2018, he has been the coach of the Prospect Panthers in Saratoga, California.	
2020	–	Taquarius Wair	Mesabi Range College football running back who was badly burnt on his body and lost four left-hand fingers in a 2005 house fire at the age of four.	
2021	–	Chris Nikic	The first person with Down syndrome to complete an Ironman Triathlon.	
2022	A well-dressed man in a suit and tie on a basketball court	Dick Vitale	Former American basketball sports commentator who was diagnosed with melanoma in August 2021 and lymphoma in October 2021 and lost his voice for a time, was declared cancer-free in April 2022.	
2023	Liam Hendriks in 2023	Liam Hendriks	Chicago White Sox closer who was diagnosed with stage four Non-Hodgkin lymphoma in December 2022 but returned to play for the team after being declared cancer-free in April 2023.	
2024	A woman in black glasses and a black shirt stands on the basketball court, coaching her team	Dawn Staley	South Carolina Gamecocks women's basketball head coach and advocate against cancer and for equality in women's sports.	
2025		Katie Schumacher-Cawley	Penn State Nittany Lions women's volleyball head coach who led the team to the 2024 NCAA championship, 3 months after being diagnosed with breast cancer.	
2026		Jim Abbott	Former Major League Baseball pitcher who had a 10-year professional baseball career despite being born without a right hand. Abbott threw a no-hitter for the New York Yankees on Sept. 4, 1993.	
