= Breast cancer chemotherapy =

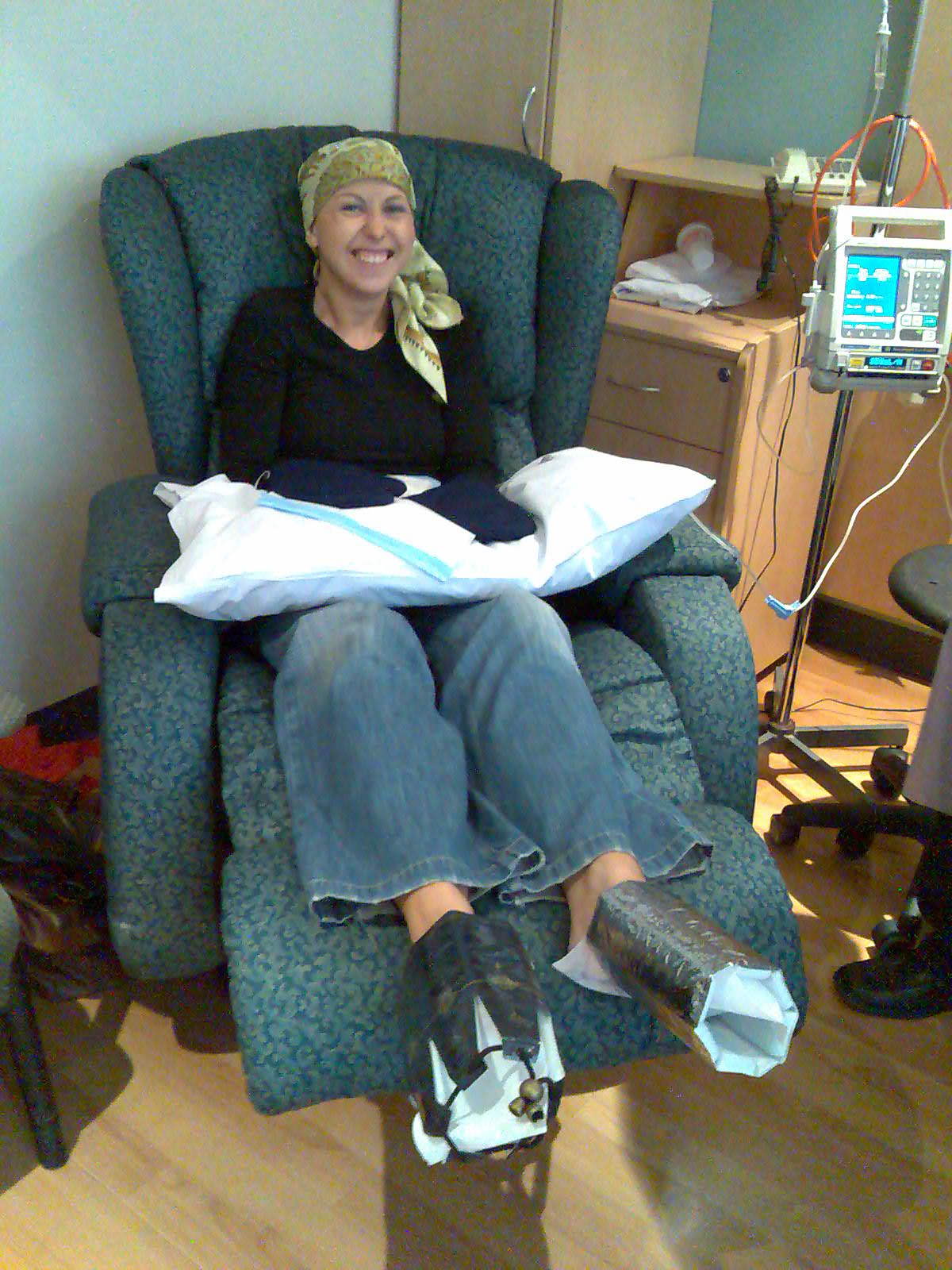
- A woman being treated with docetaxel chemotherapy for breast cancer. Cold mittens and wine chilling devices are placed on her hands and feet to prevent deleterious effects on the nails. Similar strategies can be used to prevent hair loss.
- Specialty: Oncology

Breast cancer chemotherapy refers to the use of chemotherapy in the treatment of breast cancer. Chemotherapy usually consists of the administration of some combination of antineoplastic agents according to a specific regimen. The antineoplastic agents destroy or disrupt the growth of cancer cells in order to reduce the risk that breast cancer will recur.

== Types ==
There are three major types of chemotherapy:

- Neoadjuvant therapy
  - Neoadjuvant chemotherapy is given before surgery to slow the growth of a fast-growing cancer or to shrink the size of a larger breast cancer.
  - It is frequently used to treat locally advanced cancers, cancers that at the time of diagnosis are too large to be removed by surgery, which can then be removed with less extensive surgery.
- Adjuvant therapy
  - Adjuvant chemotherapy is given after surgery to reduce the risk of recurrence. It is used to try to kill any cancer cells that might still exist and cannot be detected through imaging tests.
- Palliative chemotherapy
  - Palliative chemotherapy is used to control metastatic breast cancer (in which the cancer has spread beyond the breast and localized lymph nodes).
- Combined therapies
  - These combine, for example, non-drug treatments with localized chemotherapy to limit toxicity and achieve better results.

== Regimens ==
Multiple chemotherapeutic agents may be used in combination to treat patients with breast cancer. Determining the appropriate chemotherapy regimen to use depends on many factors; such as, the character of the tumor, lymph node status, and the age and health of the patient.

The following is a list of some of the commonly used adjuvant chemotherapy for breast cancer:

- CMF: cyclophosphamide, methotrexate, and 5-fluorouracil.
- FAC (or CAF): 5-fluorouracil, doxorubicin, cyclophosphamide.
- AC (or CA): Adriamycin (doxorubicin) and cyclophosphamide.
- AC-Taxol (or AC-T): AC followed by paclitaxel (Taxol).
- TAC: Taxotere (docetaxel), Adriamycin (doxorubicin), and cyclophosphamide.
- FEC: 5-fluorouracil, epirubicin and cyclophosphamide.
- AT: Adriamycin (doxorubicin) and Taxotere (docetaxel).

Since chemotherapy affects the production of white blood cells, a granulocyte colony-stimulating factor (G-CSF) is sometimes administered along with chemotherapy. This has been shown to reduce, though not completely prevent, the rate of infection and low white cell count. Most adjuvant breast cancer chemotherapy regimens do not routinely require growth factor support except for those associated with a high incidence of bone marrow suppression and infection. These may include chemotherapy given in the dose dense fashion i.e. 2-weekly instead of 3-weekly or TAC chemotherapy (see above).

In women with operable early breast cancer, taxane-containing adjuvant chemotherapy regimens have been found to improve overall survival and disease-free survival.

== Anthracylines ==
By conducting a meta-analysis of four large breast cancer trials including nearly 3,000 patients, the researchers have discovered that an abnormality on chromosome 17, called CEP17, is associated with a worse outcome for patients, but also that its presence is a highly significant indicator that the tumor will respond to anthracyclines.

CEP17 is detected by a common and straightforward test (fluorescent in situ hybridisation or FISH), which is carried out routinely in breast cancer patients; it is used to test for the HER2 gene to see whether the women might benefit from the drug Herceptin. Assessment for CEP17, according to John Bartlett, professor of Molecular Pathology at the University of Edinburgh, could be easily carried out in the same FISH analysis as for HER2.

== Administration ==
For breast cancer, chemotherapy drugs are given into a vein (intravenously) or by mouth as tablets or capsules (orally).
