= Team Hoyt =

American marathon participants

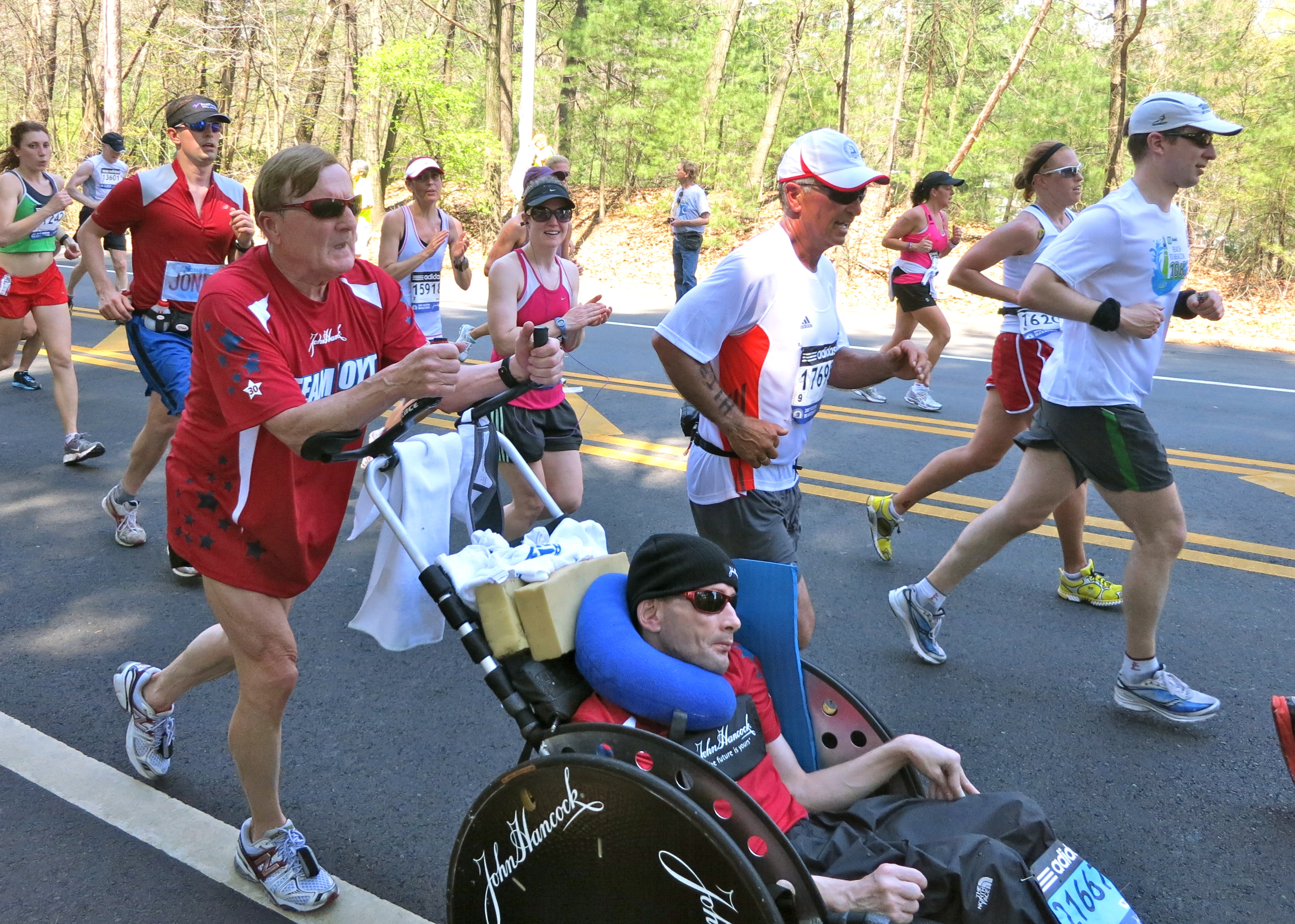
- Team Hoyt in Wellesley, Massachusetts, during the 2012 Boston Marathon
- Years active: 1977–2014
- Known for: Athletic events including the Boston Marathon
- Dick Hoyt
- Full name: Richard Eugene Hoyt Sr.
- Born: June 1, 1940; Winchester, Massachusetts, U.S.
- Died: March 17, 2021 (aged 80); Holland, Massachusetts, U.S.
- Rick Hoyt
- Full name: Richard Eugene Hoyt Jr.
- Born: January 10, 1962; Holland, Massachusetts, U.S.
- Died: May 22, 2023 (aged 61); Leicester, Massachusetts, U.S.
- Website: https://www.teamhoyt.com

Team Hoyt was the athletic duo consisting of Dick Hoyt (June 1, 1940 – March 17, 2021) and his son Rick Hoyt (January 10, 1962 – May 22, 2023) from Holland, Massachusetts. The Hoyts competed together in marathons—including over 30 editions of the Boston Marathon—and Ironman Triathlons. Rick had cerebral palsy. During competition, Dick pulled Rick in a boat during swims, carried him in a seat in the front of a bicycle, and pushed him in a wheelchair as they ran. Team Hoyt were inducted to the Ironman Hall of Fame and were recipients of ESPN's Jimmy V Award.

== Rick Hoyt's birth and early life ==
Rick Hoyt was diagnosed with cerebral palsy at birth after his umbilical cord became twisted around his neck, which caused the blockage of oxygen flow. As a result, his brain could not properly control his muscles. Many doctors encouraged the Hoyts to institutionalize Rick, informing them that he would be nothing more than a "vegetable". His parents held on to the fact that Rick's eyes would follow them around the room, giving them hope that he would somehow be able to communicate someday. The Hoyts took Rick every week to Children's Hospital in Boston, where they met a doctor who encouraged the Hoyts to treat Rick like any other child. Rick's mother Judy spent hours each day teaching Rick the alphabet with sandpaper letters and posting signs on every object in the house. In a short amount of time, Rick learned the alphabet.

At the age of 11, after some persistence from his parents, Rick was fitted with a computer that enabled him to communicate, and it became clear that Rick was intelligent. With this communication device, Rick was also able to attend public schools for the first time.

Rick went on to graduate from Boston University in 1993 with a degree in special education. He later worked at Boston College in Prof. James Gips's EagleEyes Project computer lab helping to develop systems to aid in communication and other tasks for people with disabilities. Rick's unique approach to identifying words with verbal prompts was used as a basis for the Boston College EagleEyes project's communication software.

== Team history ==
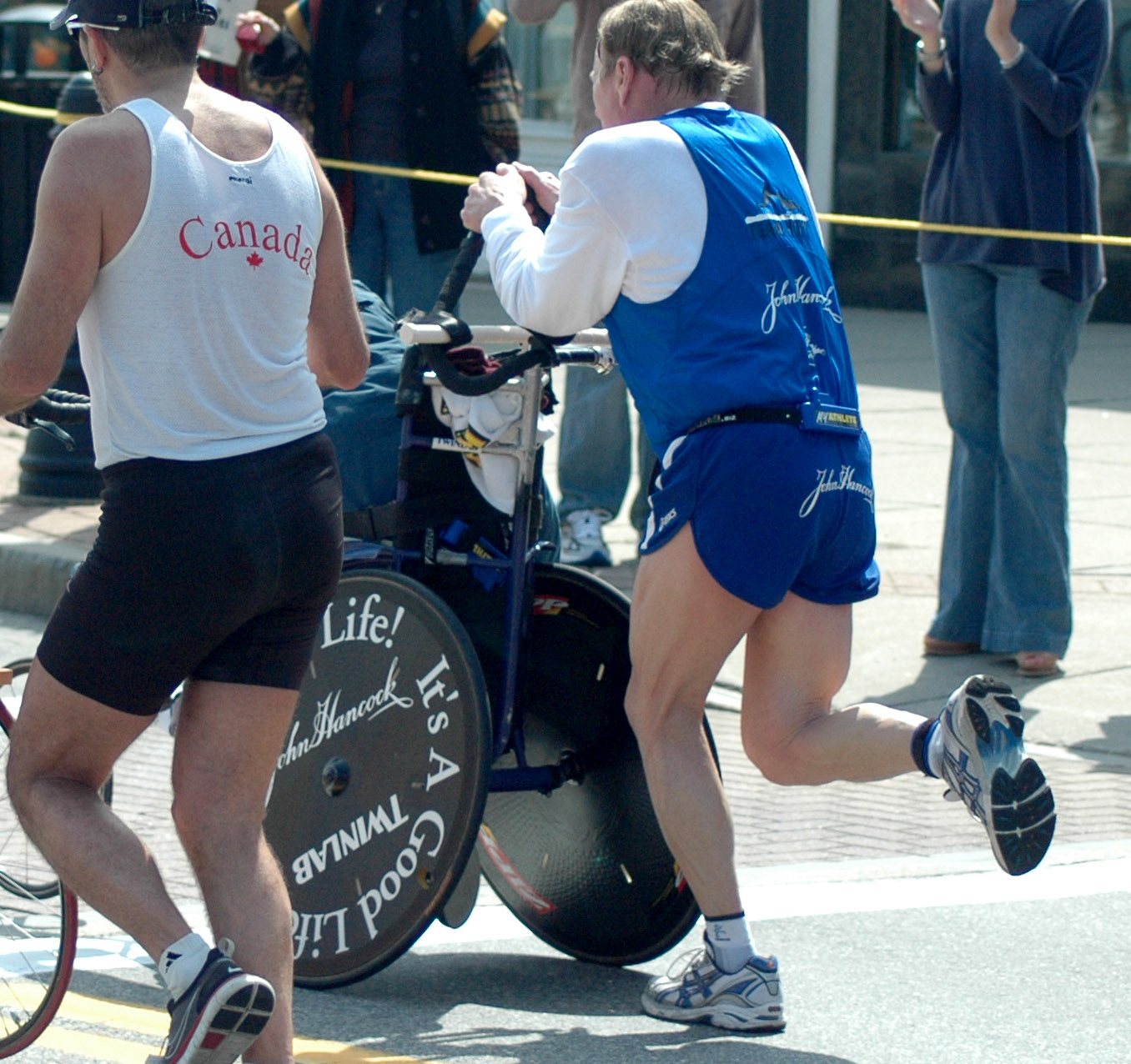
Team Hoyt in the 2008 Boston Marathon, near the halfway point

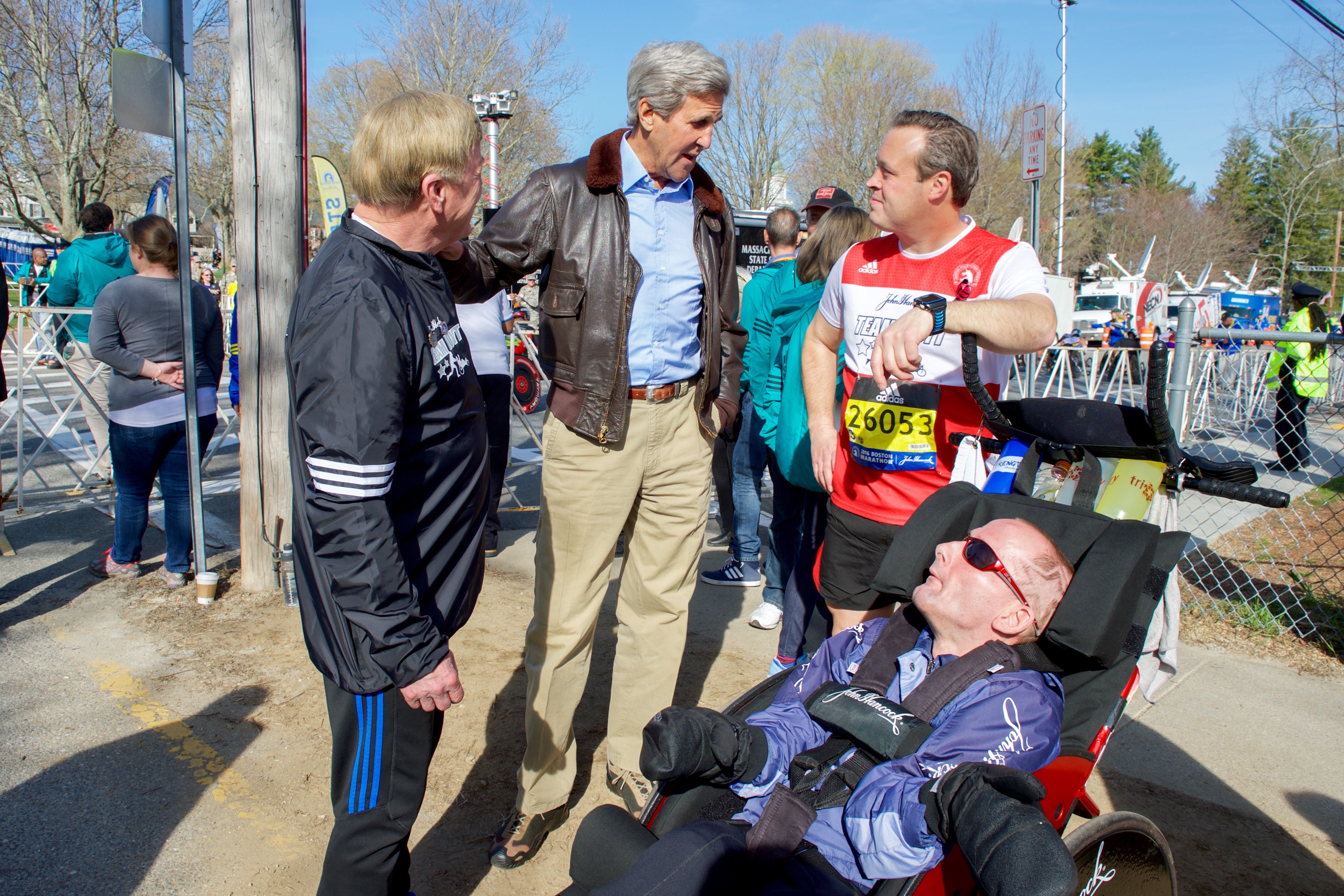
From left: Dick Hoyt, John Kerry, Bryan Lyons, and Rick Hoyt prior to the 2016 Boston Marathon

Team Hoyt began in 1977 when Rick asked his father if they could run in a race together to benefit a lacrosse player at his school who had become paralyzed. He wanted to prove that life went on no matter one's disability. Dick Hoyt, a retired Lieutenant Colonel in the Air National Guard, was not a runner and was 36 years old. After their first race Rick said, "Dad, when I'm running, it feels like I'm not handicapped." After their initial five-mile run, Dick began running every day with a bag of cement in the wheelchair because Rick was at school and studying, unable to train with him. Dick was able to improve his fitness so much that even with pushing his son, he was able to obtain a personal record of a 5K run in 17 minutes.

Through March 2016, the Hoyts had competed in 1,130 endurance events, including 72 marathons and six Ironman Triathlons. They ran the Boston Marathon 32 times, between 1980 and 2014. In addition, Dick and Rick biked and ran across the U.S. in 1992, completing a full 3,735 miles (6,011 km) in 45 days.

They also competed in triathlons. For the swim portion of a triathlon, Dick used a rope attached to his body to pull Rick sitting in a boat. For the cycle portion, Rick rode on the front of a specially designed tandem bike. For the run portion, Dick pushed Rick in his wheelchair.

In the 2013 Boston Marathon, Team Hoyt had about a mile to go when two bombs exploded near the finish line; they were stopped by officials, along with thousands of other runners still running the race. They were not injured. A bystander with an SUV gave them a ride to the Sheraton hotel, but they were temporarily separated from Rick's wheelchair.

On April 21, 2014, the Hoyts completed the 2014 Boston Marathon, having previously announced that it would be their last together. From 2015 through 2019, Rick was pushed in the Boston Marathon by Bryan Lyons, a dentist from Billerica, Massachusetts; Lyons died in June 2020, aged 50.

Dick Hoyt died in his sleep at his home in Holland, Massachusetts, on March 17, 2021, after experiencing some health problems. He was 80. Rick died from respiratory complications in Leicester, Massachusetts, on May 22, 2023. He was 61.

=== Honors ===
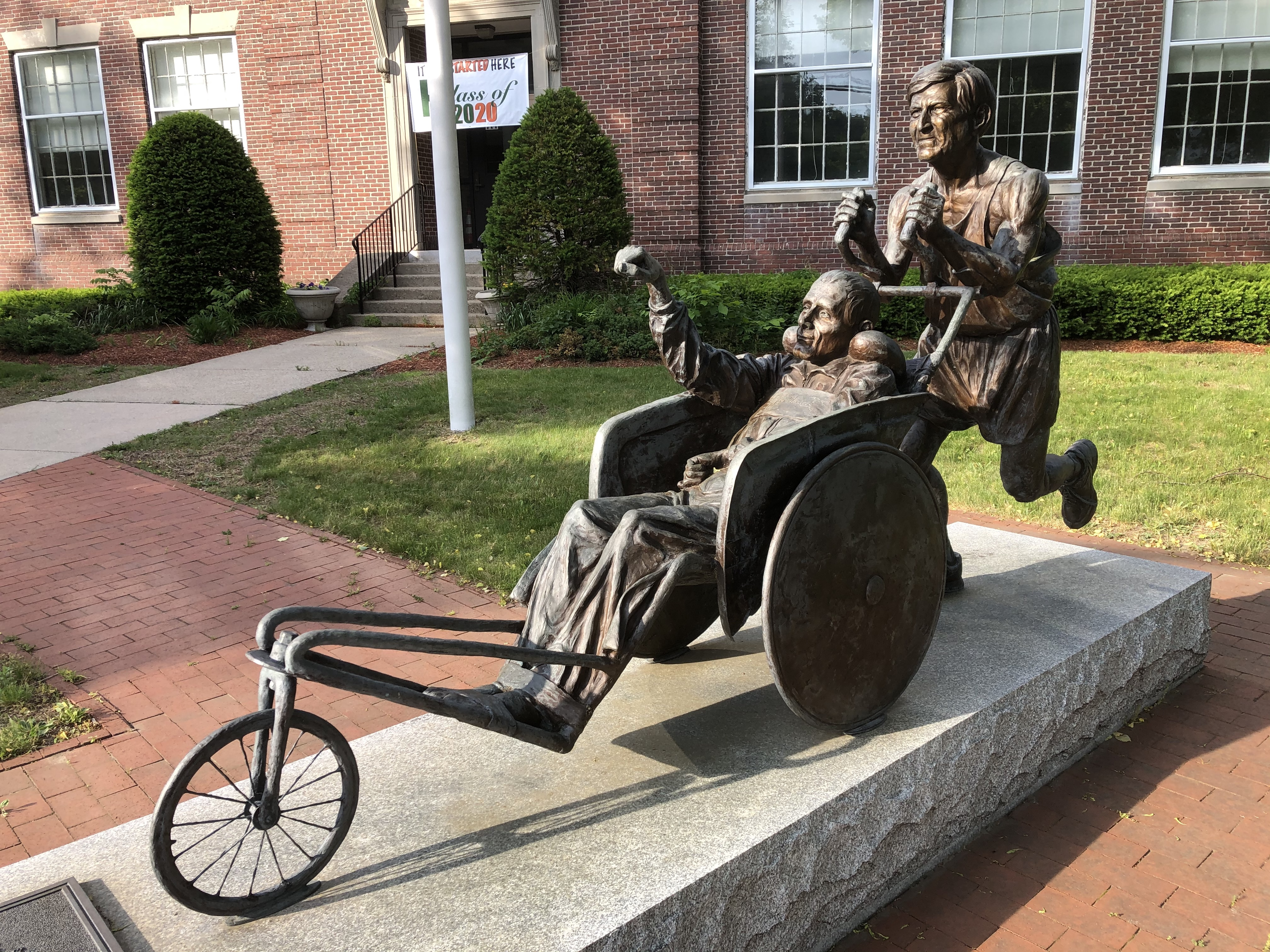
Statue of the Hoyts located near the start of the Boston Marathon in Hopkinton, Massachusetts

Team Hoyt was inducted to the Ironman Hall of Fame in 2008.

On April 8, 2013, a bronze statue of Team Hoyt was unveiled near the Boston Marathon Starting Line in Hopkinton, Massachusetts.

ESPN honored Team Hoyt with the Jimmy V Perseverance Award at the ESPY Award show on July 17, 2013.

Team Hoyt was also featured on inspirational billboards within the U.S.

=== Racing history ===
| Distance | Quantity |
|---|---|
| Triathlons | 257 |
| Ironman distances | 6 (included in triathlons) |
| Half Ironman | 7 (included in triathlons) |
| Duathlons | 22 |
| Marathons (Boston Marathons) | 72 (32) |
| 20 miles | 8 |
| 18.6 miles | 8 |
| Half Marathons | 97 |
| 20 km | 1 |
| 10 miles | 37 |
| 15 km | 8 |
| Falmouth 7 miles | 37 |
| 11 km | 2 |
| 10 km | 219 |
| 5 miles | 162 |
| 8 km | 4 |
| 7.1 km | 1 |
| 4 miles | 18 |
| 5 km | 176 |

Total events (as of March 22, 2016): 1,130
