= Mafosfamide =

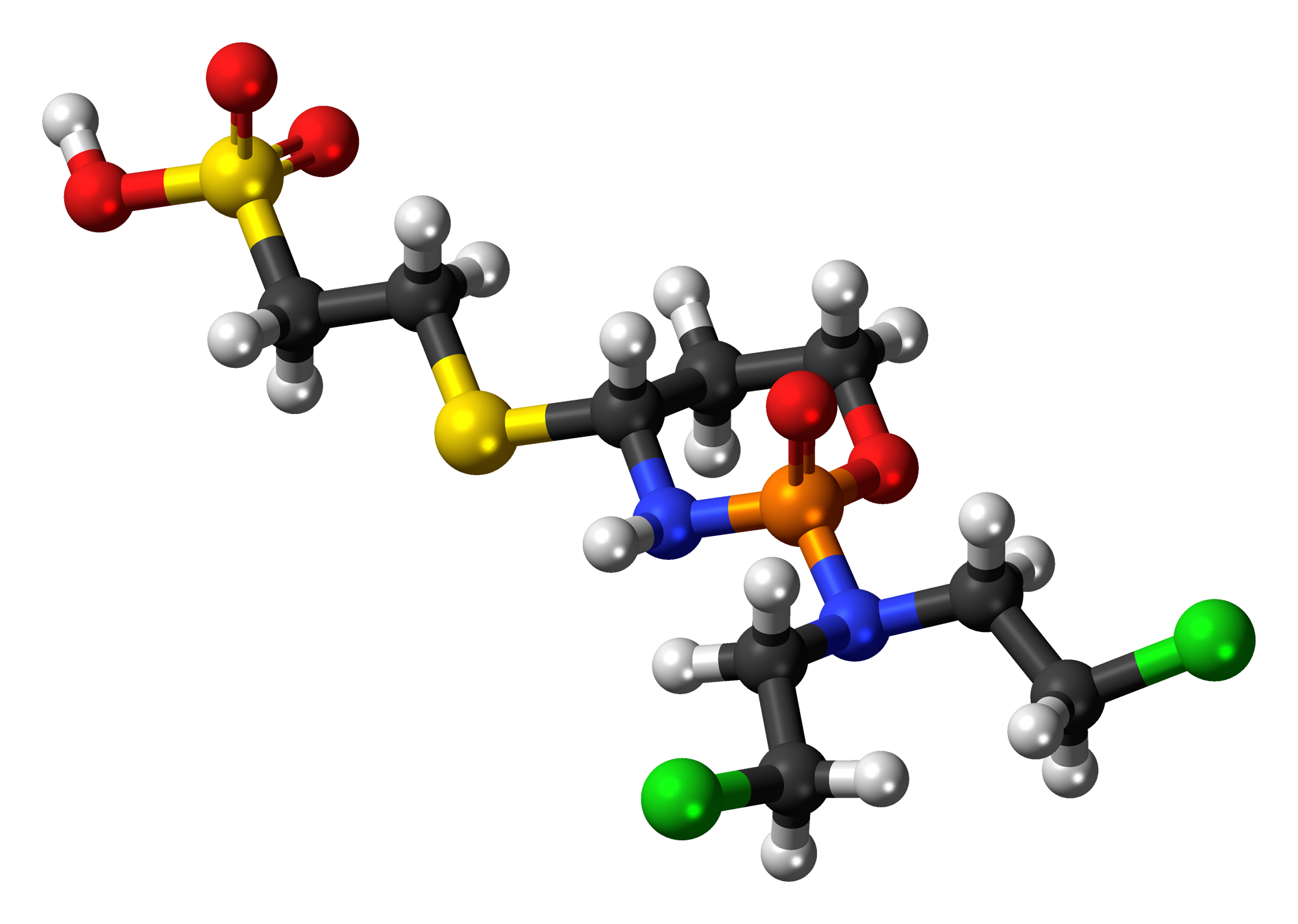

Names
- IUPAC name 2-{(2-[bis(2-chloroethyl)amino]-2-oxido-1,3,2-oxazaphosphinan-4-yl}thio)ethanesulfonic acid
- Other names 2-{[2-[bis(2-chloroethyl)amino]-2-oxo-1-oxa-3-aza-2λ^{5}-phosphacyclohex-4-yl}sulfanyl]ethanesulfonic acid ASTA-Z-7557

Identifiers
| CAS Number | 88859-04-5 |
| 3D model (JSmol) | Interactive image |
| ChemSpider | 16736958 |
| MeSH | Mafosfamide |
| PubChem CID | 104746 |
| UNII | 5970HH9923 |
| CompTox Dashboard (EPA) | DTXSID90905075 |
- InChI: InChI=1S/C9H19Cl2N2O5PS2/c10-2-4-13(5-3-11)19(14)12-9(1-6-18-19)20-7-8-21(15,16)17/h9H,1-8H2,(H,12,14)(H,15,16,17)/t9-,19-/m1/s1 Key: PBUUPFTVAPUWDE-AYLIAGHASA-N; InChI=1/C9H19Cl2N2O5PS2/c10-2-4-13(5-3-11)19(14)12-9(1-6-18-19)20-7-8-21(15,16)17/h9H,1-8H2,(H,12,14)(H,15,16,17)/t9-,19-/m1/s1 Key: PBUUPFTVAPUWDE-AYLIAGHABO
- SMILES: O=P1(N[C@@H](CCO1)SCCS(O)(=O)=O)N(CCCl)CCCl

Properties
| Chemical formula | C_{9}H_{19}Cl_{2}N_{2}O_{5}PS_{2} |
| Molar mass | 401.25 g·mol^{−1} |
- Except where otherwise noted, data are given for materials in their standard state (at 25 °C [77 °F], 100 kPa). verify (what is ?) Infobox references

Mafosfamide (INN; development code ASTA-Z-7557) is an oxazaphosphorine (cyclophosphamide-like) alkylating agent under investigation as a chemotherapeutic. It is metabolized by cytochrome P450 into 4-hydroxycyclophosphamide, which is then converted into aldophosphamide, which, in turn yields the cytotoxic metabolites phosphoramide mustard and acrolein.

Several Phase I trials have been completed.
