= CMF (chemotherapy) =

Chemotherapy regimen

- Specialty: Oncology

Cyclophosphamide Methotrexate Fluorouracil (CMF) is a commonly used regimen of breast cancer chemotherapy that combines three anti-cancer agents: cyclophosphamide, methotrexate, and 5-fluorouracil (5-FU).

While it is no longer considered the most efficient all-around chemotherapy, it retains a great importance in the treatment of elderly patients with luminal cancers and may become important for the treatment of estrogen receptor negative androgen receptor positive luminal (GATA3 expressing) breast cancer.

The regimen was designed in order to mimic the highly successful regimen developed to treat Hodgkin's lymphoma.

== Treatment ==
The treatment is administered over a four-week cycle. On days 1 and 8 methotrexate and 5-FU are given as injections. Cyclophosphamide may be also administered intravenously in conjunction with these drugs, or may be taken as an oral tablet, taken once each day for the first 14 days of each cycle.

== Side effects ==
Side effects of CMF treatment include:

- Nausea
- Tiredness
- Mouth ulcers
- Infections
- Diarrhea
- Hair loss
- Loss of fertility
