= Chris Nikic =

American triathlete

Personal information
- Nationality: American
- Born: October 7, 1999 (age 26)

Sport
- Sport: Triathlon

Chris Nikic (born October 6, 1999) is an American amateur triathlete. In 2020, at age 21, he became the first person with Down syndrome to finish an Ironman triathlon. For this accomplishment, Nikic was awarded the Jimmy V Award for Perseverance as part of the 2021 ESPY Awards. Additionally, he won the ESPY for Best Athlete with a Disability in Men's Sports.

== Ironman Triathlon ==
=== Training ===
Nikic trained with Dan Grieb, who has completed 16 Ironman races, for four to eight hours each day for around one year. He began exercising in 2017 with a single pushup and aimed to improve his performance 1% each day.

''I have to work hard and give my best every day. If I do an Ironman and become a pro-speaker I will have a chance to get my dream.'' Chris Nikic

Nikic is also training for the 2022 Special Olympics USA Games.

=== 2020 Ironman Florida ===
Nikic completed the Ironman Florida triathlon in 16 hours 46 minutes 9 seconds, swimming 2.4-mile (3.86 km), cycling 112-mile (180.25 km), and then running a marathon 26.22-mile (42.20 km). This earned him recognition from Guinness World Records. His time was 14 minutes faster than the cut-off time for qualification.

"We don't make any accommodations for anyone around the core elements of racing." --Andrew Messick, CEO of Ironman Group.

=== 2022 Ironman Hawaii ===
Nikic bested his Florida Ironman time two years later in the 2022 Ironman World Championships in Kona, Hawaii, with a time of 16 hours, 31 minutes. In announcing Nikic's record-breaking feat of being the only person with Down syndrome to complete two IRONMAN competitions, the Special Olympics announced the triathlete's designation as a Special Olympics Champion Ambassador, "for the impact he's made on the organization."

== Early life ==
Nikic grew up in Florida. He had open-heart surgery at five months old, and was not able to walk well until four years old or eat solid food until age five.
