= 2021 ESPY Awards =

Athletic awards show

- Date: July 10, 2021
- Location: The Rooftop at Pier 17, New York City
- Country: United States
- Hosted by: Anthony Mackie

Television/radio coverage
- Network: ABC
- Runtime: 180 minutes

The 2021 ESPY Awards were the 29th annual ceremony of the ESPY Award, held on July 10, 2021 at The Rooftop at Pier 17 in New York City and broadcast on ABC. Actor Anthony Mackie served as the host. The awards aired on ESPN and ESPN2 on July 11, and a two-hour version aired on ESPN July 13.

== Format ==
After the COVID-19 pandemic made the 2020 ESPYs a virtual taped event, it was a live in-person show with many of the winners showing up to accept their awards. The ESPYs brought back many of the categories from 2019; however, Best Upset, Best Esports Moment and Best Viral Moment were not awarded.

Several categories were renamed and/or changed in scope:

- Best Male Athlete and Best Female Athlete are now Best Athlete, Men's Sports and Best Athlete, Women's Sports, respectively.
- The Best Male and Female College Athlete awards, last presented in 2017, were reinstated and respectively renamed Best College Athlete, Men's Sports and Best College Athlete, Women's Sports.
- The Best International Soccer Player awards for men and women, previously presented to soccer players who were either born outside the U.S. or were not U.S. citizens, were renamed Best International Athlete, Men's Soccer and Best International Athlete, Women's Soccer. In addition, these awards are now presented to individuals who play at club level in leagues outside of the U.S. soccer pyramid, regardless of the players' nationalities.

== Winners and nominees ==
Best Athlete, Men's Sports: Tom Brady – Tampa Bay Buccaneers, NFL; Lewis Hamilton – Formula One; Nikola Jokic – Denver Nuggets, NBA; Connor McDavid – Edmonton Oilers, NHL	Best Athlete, Women's Sports: Naomi Osaka – Women's Tennis, WTA; Simone Biles – gymnastics; Amanda Nunes – mixed martial arts, UFC; Breanna Stewart – Seattle Storm, WNBA
Best Breakthrough Athlete: LaMelo Ball – Charlotte Hornets, NBA; Justin Herbert – Los Angeles Chargers, NFL; Chase Young – Washington Football Team, NFL; Crystal Dangerfield – Minnesota Lynx, WNBA	Best Team: Tampa Bay Buccaneers – NFL; Alabama Crimson Tide football, NCAA Division I FBS; Baylor Bears basketball, NCAA men's basketball; Los Angeles Dodgers, MLB; Oklahoma Sooners softball, winner of the 2021 Women's College World Series; Seattle Storm, WNBA; Stanford Cardinal women's basketball, NCAA women's basketball
Best Game: NCAA men's Final Four Gonzaga defeats UCLA 93-90 in overtime; NCAA Women's Basketball Championship Stanford defeats Arizona 54–53; NFL Week 14: Baltimore Ravens 47, Cleveland Browns 42; NHL Playoffs Game 4: Winnipeg Jets sweep Edmonton Oilers in triple OT	Best Play^{1}: Kyler Murray's "Hail Murray" pass to DeAndre Hopkins; Finalists: unseeded Marshall scores the game winner in overtime to win NCAA College Cup men's soccer tournament; DK Metcalf chases down Budda Baker; Simone Biles becomes the first gymnast to execute a Yurchenko Double Pike vault in competition
Best College Athlete, Men's Sports: DeVonta Smith – Alabama; Gloire Amanda – Oregon State soccer; Luka Garza – Iowa basketball; Trevor Lawrence – Clemson football	Best College Athlete, Women's Sports: Paige Bueckers – UConn basketball; Odicci Alexander – James Madison softball; Jaelin Howell – Florida State soccer; Madison Lilley – Kentucky volleyball
Best Record-Breaking Performance: Russell Westbrook surpassing Oscar Robertson's 181 career triple-doubles record; Stanford's Tara VanDerveer passes Pat Summitt for most wins in NCAA Women's basketball history (1,099); Alabama football player DeVonta Smith set records for title game catches (12) and touchdown receptions (three); PGA Championship winner Phil Mickelson became the oldest winner of a major tournament with his victory at age 50	Best NFL Player: Tom Brady – Tampa Bay Buccaneers; Aaron Donald – Los Angeles Rams; Derrick Henry – Tennessee Titans; Aaron Rodgers – Green Bay Packers
Best MLB Player^{2}: Shohei Ohtani – Los Angeles Angels; Jose Abreu - Chicago White Sox; Trevor Bauer - Cincinnati Reds, Los Angeles Dodgers; Corey Seager - Los Angeles Dodgers	Best NBA Player: Stephen Curry – Golden State Warriors; Luka Dončić – Dallas Mavericks; Nikola Jokić – Denver Nuggets; Chris Paul – Phoenix Suns
Best NHL Player: Patrick Kane – Chicago Blackhawks; Auston Matthews – Toronto Maple Leafs; Connor McDavid – Edmonton Oilers; Andrei Vasilevskiy – Tampa Bay Lightning	Best WNBA Player: Breanna Stewart – Seattle Storm; Arike Ogunbowale – Dallas Wings; Candace Parker – Los Angeles Sparks, Chicago Sky; A'ja Wilson – Las Vegas Aces
Best MLS Player: Diego Rossi – Los Angeles FC; Andre Blake – Philadelphia Union; Alejandro Pozuelo – Toronto FC; Lucas Zelarayán – Columbus Crew	Best NWSL Player: Julie Ertz – Chicago Red Stars; Rachel Daly – Houston Dash; Kailen Sheridan – NJ/NY Gotham FC; Lynn Williams – North Carolina Courage
Best International Athlete, Men's Soccer: Cristiano Ronaldo – Juventus/Portugal; Kylian Mbappé – Paris Saint-Germain/France; Lionel Messi – Barcelona/Argentina; Mohamed Salah – Liverpool/Egypt	Best International Athlete, Women's Soccer: Sam Mewis – Manchester City/United States; Sam Kerr – Chelsea/Australia; Fran Kirby – Chelsea/England; Vivianne Miedema – Arsenal/Netherlands
Best Driver: Lewis Hamilton – Formula One; Scott Dixon, IndyCar; Chase Elliott, NASCAR; Erica Enders, NHRA	Best Jockey: Joel Rosario; Irad Ortiz; Flavien Prat; John Velazquez
Best Male Golfer: Phil Mickelson; Bryson DeChambeau; Dustin Johnson; Hideki Matsuyama	Best Female Golfer: Sei Young Kim; Jin Young Ko; Nelly Korda; Inbee Park
Best Boxer: Tyson Fury; Canelo Álvarez; Teófimo López; Claressa Shields	Best MMA Fighter: Khabib Nurmagomedov; Rose Namajunas; Francis Ngannou; Amanda Nunes
Best Male Action Sports Athlete: Gabriel Medina – Surfing; Marcus Kleveland – Snowboarding; Yūto Totsuka – Snowboarding; Cooper Webb – Supercross	Best Female Action Sports Athlete: Chloe Kim – Snowboarding; Eileen Gu – Skiing; Carissa Moore – Surfing; Zoi Sadowski-Synnott – Snowboarding
Best Athlete, Men's Tennis: Novak Djokovic; Daniil Medvedev; Rafael Nadal; Dominic Thiem	Best Athlete, Women's Tennis: Naomi Osaka; Victoria Azarenka; Ashleigh Barty; Sofia Kenin
Best Male Athlete with a Disability: Chris Nikic – triathlon; Evan Austin – Swimming; Jesse Billauer – Surfing; Keith Gabel – Snowboarding	Best Female Athlete with a Disability: Rebecca Murray – Wheelchair basketball; Sam Bosco – Cycling; Oksana Masters – Nordic & Cycle; Leanne Smith – Swimming
Best WWE Moment^{1}: Sasha Banks and Bianca Belair make history as the first Black women to main-event WrestleMania; Bad Bunny wrestles at WrestleMania 37; Bianca Belair wins Women's Royal Rumble match at 2021 Royal Rumble; Edge wins Men's Royal Rumble	Best Bowler: Tom Daugherty; Kyle Troup; François Lavoie; Chris Via

1. Best Play and Best WWE Moment were in an elimination format with 16 entrants at the beginning.
2. Best MLB Player voting was halted, mainly due to allegations of sexual assault by Trevor Bauer.

== Honorary Awards ==
Jimmy V Award

- Chris Nikic, triathlon

Arthur Ashe Courage Award

- Maya Moore

Muhammad Ali Sports Humanitarian Award

- Laurent Duvernay-Tardif

Pat Tillman Award for Service

- Marcus Rashford, Manchester United and England national football team

Best Coach

- Tara VanDerveer, Stanford Cardinal women's basketball head coach

Best Championship Moment

- Los Angeles Dodgers win 2020 World Series

Best Championship Performance

- Simone Biles - gymnastics
