= Donor lymphocyte infusion =

Therapy used in the field of bone marrow transplantation

Donor lymphocyte (or leukocyte) infusion (DLI) or buffy coat infusion is a form of adoptive immunotherapy used to treat relapses after hematopoietic stem cell transplantation for several types of blood cancer. The infusion of healthy lymphocytes from the donor can help eliminate remaining cancer cells, leading to remission.

== History ==
Before the development of therapies like donor lymphocyte infusion, relapsed patients after a bone marrow transplant often had limited curative options. The main strategy was to attempt a second transplant. However, undergoing a second hematopoietic stem cell transplant carries a high risk of serious, potentially life-threatening complications.

Donor lymphocyte infusion was first used in 1990 in LMU Klinikum in Munich, Germany. The treatment was tested in three patients suffering from a relapse of chronic myelogenous leukemia after bone marrow transplantation. After donor lymphocyte infusion, all three recovered and showed complete remission.

== Procedure ==
In donor lymphocyte infusion, the white blood cells of a donor are infused into a patient that has previously received a stem cell transplant from the same person. During the process, the donor's blood circulates through an apheresis machine to separate the white blood cells. The rest of the blood is returned to the donor, while the white blood cells are given to the recipient.

T-cells are a subtype of immune cells that play significant roles in transplant rejection and cancer. T-cell exhaustion is a key factor in post-transplant relapse. Therefore, donor lymphocyte infusion aims to give new T-cells to the transplant recipient and enhance their immune response.

The goal of this therapy is to induce a remission of the patient's cancer by a process called the graft-versus-tumor effect (GVT). The donor T-cells can attack and control the growth of residual cancer cells providing the GVT effect. It is hoped that the donor leukocyte infusion will cause GVT and lead to a remission of the patients cancer. Patients might require standard chemotherapy, to reduce the amount of cancer cells they have prior to their donor lymphocyte infusion.

== Complications ==
Complications of donor lymphocyte infusion include acute and chronic graft-versus-host disease and bone marrow aplasia, resulting in immunosuppression and susceptibility to opportunistic infections.
