= 4-Hydroxycyclophosphamide =

Chemical compound

Identifiers
- IUPAC name: 2-[bis(2-Chloroethyl)amino]-4-hydroxy-2H1,3,2-oxazaphosphinan-2-one
- CAS Number: 40277-05-2
- PubChem CID: 99735
- ChemSpider: 90110
- UNII: 1XBF4E50HS
- ChEMBL: ChEMBL731
- CompTox Dashboard (EPA): DTXSID90960669

Chemical and physical data
- Formula: C_{7}H_{15}Cl_{2}N_{2}O_{3}P
- Molar mass: 277.08 g·mol^{−1}
- 3D model (JSmol): Interactive image
- SMILES: OC1CCOP(=O)(N1)N(CCCl)CCCl
- InChI: InChI=1S/C7H15Cl2N2O3P/c8-2-4-11(5-3-9)15(13)10-7(12)1-6-14-15/h7,12H,1-6H2,(H,10,13); Key:RANONBLIHMVXAJ-UHFFFAOYSA-N

4-Hydroxycyclophosphamide is in the class of oxazaphosphorine compounds, and is the main, active metabolite of cyclophosphamide and of mafosfamide after they partially metabolized by cytochrome P450. It is then partially tautomerized into aldophosphamide, which, in turn, easily enters live cells and then is partially detoxified into inactive carboxycyclophosphamide by the enzyme ALDH, but partially is hydrolyzed by another cell's enzyme phosphatase to the two directly cytotoxic metabolites - phosphoramide mustard and acrolein.
