= Carboxycyclophosphamide =

Names
- Preferred IUPAC name 3-({Amino[bis(2-chloroethyl)amino]phosphoryl}oxy)propanoic acid
- Other names Carboxyphosphamide

Identifiers
| CAS Number | 22788-18-7 |
| 3D model (JSmol) | Interactive image |
| ChemSpider | 29229 |
| PubChem CID | 31515 |
| UNII | DP4677AX41 |
| CompTox Dashboard (EPA) | DTXSID801030866 |
- InChI: InChI=1S/C7H15Cl2N2O4P/c8-2-4-11(5-3-9)16(10,14)15-6-1-7(12)13/h1-6H2,(H2,10,14)(H,12,13) Key: QLAKAJLYYGOZQL-UHFFFAOYSA-N; InChI=1/C7H15Cl2N2O4P/c8-2-4-11(5-3-9)16(10,14)15-6-1-7(12)13/h1-6H2,(H2,10,14)(H,12,13) Key: QLAKAJLYYGOZQL-UHFFFAOYAS
- SMILES: C(COP(=O)(N)N(CCCl)CCCl)C(=O)O

Properties
| Chemical formula | C_{7}H_{15}Cl_{2}N_{2}O_{4}P |
| Molar mass | 293.084762 |
- Except where otherwise noted, data are given for materials in their standard state (at 25 °C [77 °F], 100 kPa). Infobox references

Carboxycyclophosphamide is an inactive metabolite of the cytotoxic antineoplastic drug cyclophosphamide. In the metabolic pathway of cyclophosphamide inactivation it first metabolizes to 4-hydroxycyclophosphamide, then partially tautomerizes into aldophosphamide. Aldophosphamide then, in turn, is oxidized into carboxycyclophosphamide by the enzyme ALDH (aldehyde dehydrogenase).
