= Graft-versus-tumor effect =

Graft-versus-tumor effect (GvT) appears after allogeneic hematopoietic stem cell transplantation (HSCT). The graft contains donor T cells (T lymphocytes) that can be beneficial for the recipient by eliminating residual malignant cells. GvT might develop after recognizing tumor-specific or recipient-specific alloantigens. It could lead to remission or immune control of hematologic malignancies. This effect applies in myeloma and lymphoid leukemias, lymphoma, multiple myeloma and possibly breast cancer. It is closely linked with graft-versus-host disease (GvHD), as the underlying principle of alloimmunity is the same. CD4+CD25+ regulatory T cells (Treg) can be used to suppress GvHD without loss of beneficial GvT effect. The biology of GvT response is still not fully understood but it is probable that the reaction with polymorphic minor histocompatibility antigens expressed either specifically on hematopoietic cells or more widely on a number of tissue cells or tumor-associated antigens is involved. This response is mediated largely by cytotoxic T lymphocytes (CTL) but it can be employed by natural killers (NK cells) as separate effectors, particularly in T-cell-depleted HLA-haploidentical HSCT.

== Graft-versus-leukemia ==
Graft-versus-leukemia (GvL) is a specific type of GvT effect. As the name of this effect indicates, GvL is a reaction against leukemic cells of the host. GvL requires genetic disparity because the effect is dependent on the alloimmunity principle. GvL is a part of the reaction of the graft against the host. Whereas graft-versus-host-disease (GvHD) has a negative impact on the host, GvL is beneficial for patients with hematopoietic malignancies. The interconnection of those two effects can be seen by comparison of leukemia relapse after HSC transplantation with development of GvHD. Patients who develop chronic or acute GvHD have lower chance of leukemia relapse. When transplanting T-cell depleted stem cell transplant, GvHD can be partially prevented, but in the same time the GvL effect is also reduced, because T-cells play an important role in both of those effects. The possibilities of GvL effect in the treatment of hematopoietic malignancies are limited by GvHD. The ability to induce GvL but not GvH after HSCT would be very beneficial for those patients. There are some strategies to suppress the GvHD after transplantation or to enhance GvL but none of them provide an ideal solution to this problem. For some forms of hematopoietic malignancies, for example acute myeloid leukemia (AML), the essential cells during HSCT are, beside the donor's T cells, the NK cells, which interact with KIR receptors. NK cells are within the first cells to repopulate host's bone marrow which means they play important role in the transplant engraftment. For their role in the GvL effect, their alloreactivity is required. Because KIR and HLA genes are inherited independently, the ideal donor can have compatible HLA genes and KIR receptors that induce the alloreaction of NK cells at the same time. This will occur with most of the non-related donor. When transplanting HSC during AML, T-cells are usually selectively depleted to prevent GvHD while NK cells help with the GvL effect which prevent leukemia relapse. When using non-depleted T-cell transplant, cyclophosphamide is used after transplantation to prevent GvHD or transplant rejection. Other strategies currently clinically used for suppressing GvHD and enhancing GvL are for example optimization of transplant condition or donor lymphocyte infusion (DLI) after transplantation. However, none of those provide satisfactory universal results, thus other options are still being inspected. One of the possibilities is the use of cytokines. Granulocyte colony-stimulating factor (G-CSF) is used to mobilize HSC and mediate T cell tolerance during transplantation. G-CSF can help to enhance GvL effect and suppress GvHD by reducing levels of LPS and TNF-α. Using G-CSF also increases levels of Treg, which can also help with prevention of GvHD. Other cytokines can also be used to prevent or reduce GvHD without eliminating GvL, for example KGF, IL-11, IL-18 and IL-35.

== See also ==
- Graft-versus-host disease
- Hematopoietic stem cell transplantation
