= Great Alaskan Lumberjack Show =

Lumberjack show in Ketchikan, Alaska

- Logo
- Company: Lumberjack Sports International
- Genre: Woodsman
- Show type: Resident
- Date of premiere: May 2000
- Location: 420 Spruce Mill Way; Ketchikan, Alaska

Creative team
- Founder: Rob Scheer
- Official website

The Great Alaskan Lumberjack Show is a lumberjack show performed in Ketchikan, Alaska. Established in May 2000 by Rob Scheer, the show is put on by the Wisconsin-based Lumberjack Sports International. Located near the Ketchikan Creek, the show's venue has 475 seats and is at the former site of the Ketchikan Spruce Mill, which closed in 1993. Ketchikan's economy once had a heavy reliance on the wood industry, peaking at the beginning of the 20th century but declining by the 1990s. The show pays homage to the city's lumber history.

Two teams of two lumberjacks each compete for the title of "King of the Woods". One team represents the Spruce Mill team of Ketchikan, while the other represents the Dawson Creek team of the Yukon. With a one-hour run time, the Great Alaskan Lumberjack Show features 13 events. The events include axe throwing, boom running, bucksawing, chainsaw carving, crosscut sawing, hot sawing, logrolling, obstacle pole racing, relay racing, speed climbing, tree climbing, tree topping, underhand chopping, and woodchopping. Reviewers praised the show for being entertaining and for teaching about lumberjack history but criticized it for being corny and expensive.

== Location and venue ==
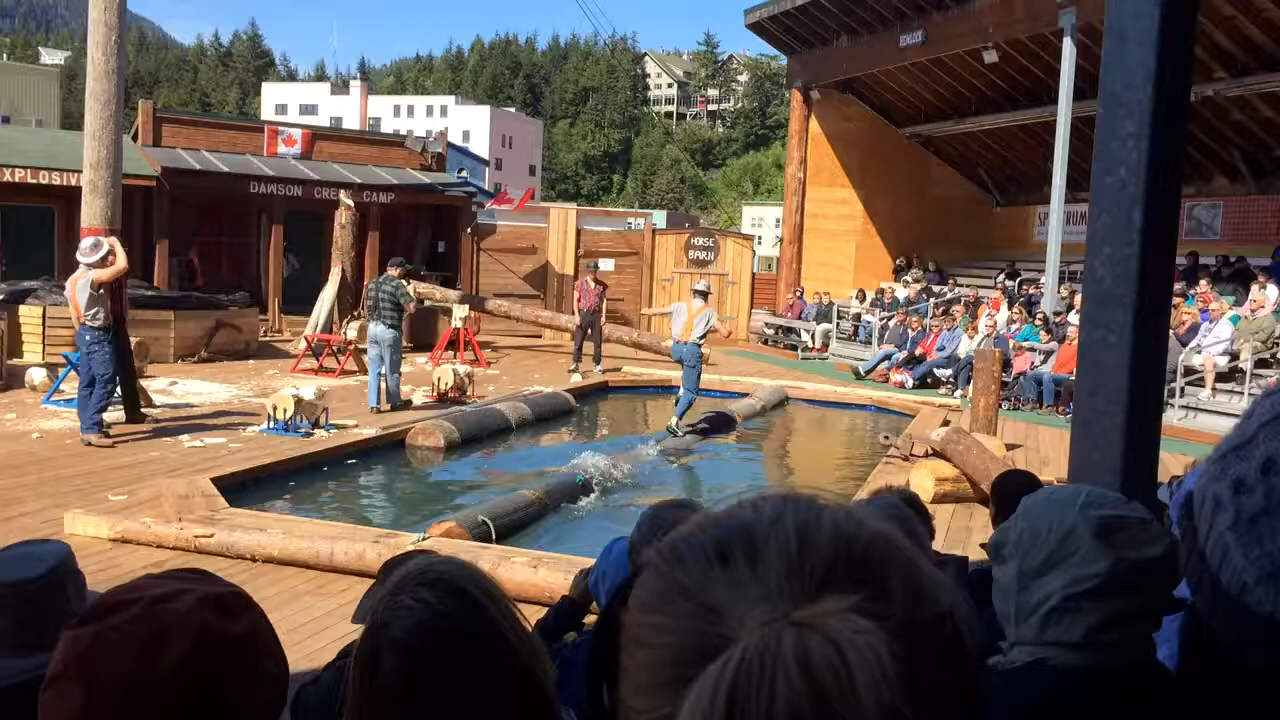
The show's venue circa 2014

Performed in Ketchikan, Alaska, the Great Alaskan Lumberjack Show is located close to the mouth of Ketchikan Creek, near the city's waterfront. The show's venue is one block away from where cruise ships anchor. It is next to the Southeast Alaska Discovery Center. The show takes place on the former location of the Louisiana-Pacific-owned Ketchikan Spruce Mill, which was built in 1898 and ceased operations in 1983 and used to be the biggest spruce mill worldwide. Lumberjacks employed at the mill produced lumber for the Klondike Gold Rush, nearby canneries, and World War II airplanes. The location remained unused until the show opened there.

The show is performed in an all-weather amphitheatre containing a heated and enclosed grandstand. The seats are cushioned. The grandstand has 475 seats and is accessible to people with disabilities. The venue showcases historic photos and relics related from the timber industry. The show has a gift shop that Eric Moya of Travel Weekly said evokes a Cracker Barrel through its "appropriately rustic-Americana aesthetic". The store sells cookbooks, lumberjack clothes, and calendars spotlighting each lumberjack performer.

== History ==
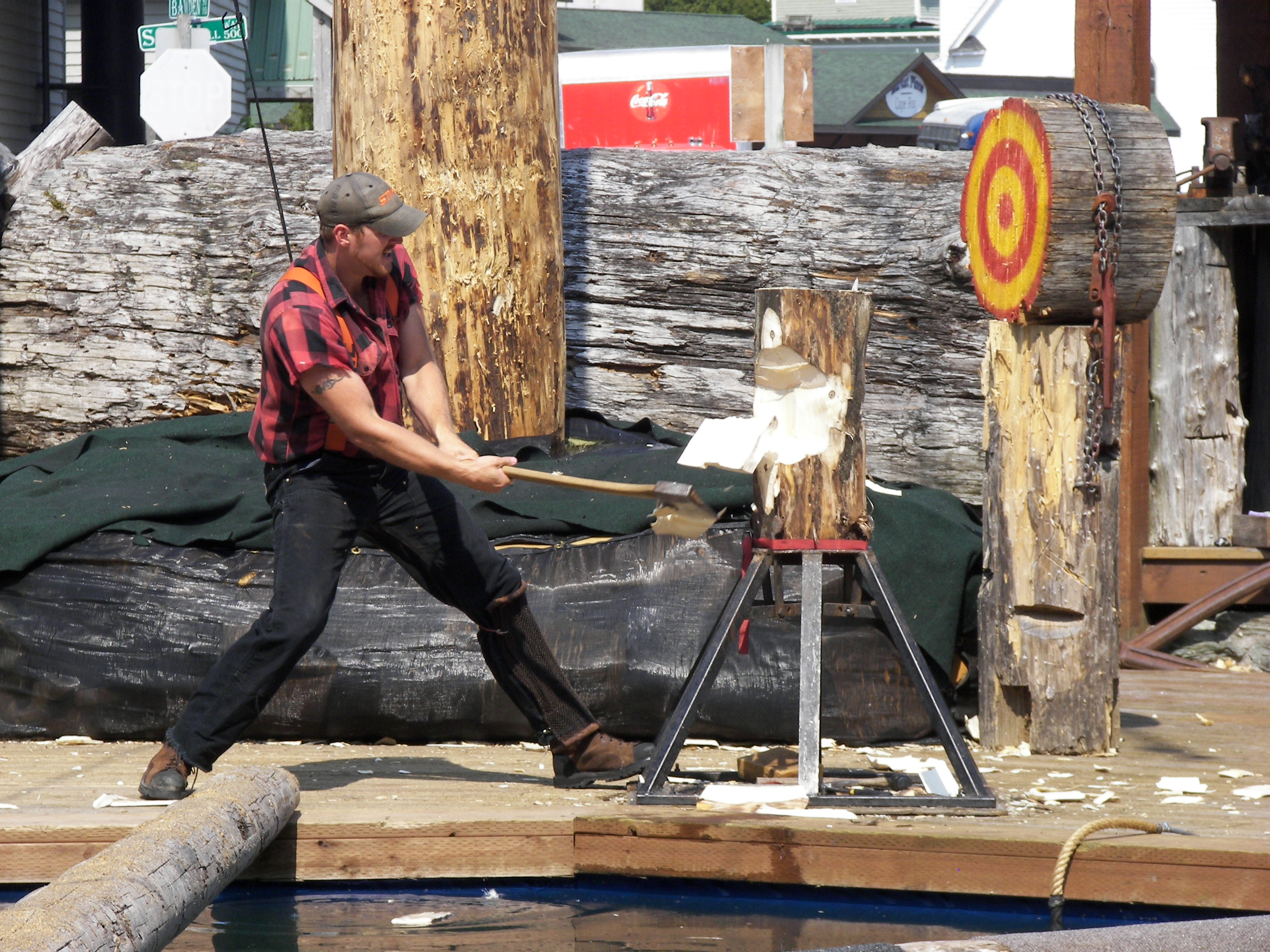
Andy Colle, a performer, does a standing block chop in 2009.

The Scheer family lived in Hayward, Wisconsin, where the Lumberjack World Championship is held every year. The six Scheer siblings took logging classes in their youth and subsequently created several lumberjack shows. Founded by Rob Scheer in Ketchikan, Alaska, the Great Alaskan Lumberjack Show was first performed in May 2000. The show is run by the Wisconsin-based Lumberjack Sports International, which has events shown on ABC, ESPN, the Outdoor Life Network, and TNN. The company employed two groups who traveled in semi-trailer trucks equipped with tree trunks people could scale. In the show's first season, passengers of cruise ships that docked in Ketchikan could purchase the show's tickets on the ships. The show is popular with cruise ship passengers. Running between May and September, it is performed between one and five times every day.

Ketchikan's economy used to rely significantly on the wood industry, reaching its height at the beginning of the 20th century. Southeastern United States lumberjacks visited Ketchikan in the summers to vie for the title of "King of the Woods". Timber groups at the end of the 19th century and the start of the 20th century engaged in contests. The Great Alaskan Lumberjack Show recreates the contests from that era. The lumber industry diminished in the 1990s, and the city's economy became fully committed to tourism. The show pays homage to the city's lumber history. The Ketchikan Pulp Company, a nearby pulp mill, had not long ago shut down, causing the unemployment of 1,700 workers in the logger sector. Between 1995 and 2000, the number of loggers in Naukati Bay who went every day to the forest for work dropped from 70 to roughly nine. When the show premiered, the loggers believed that the show could offer employment to them. The show, however, hired its cast from outside of Alaska. The loggers became exasperated that a tourist show aimed to make money from a market in decline. Mike Schafer, the planner for the Prince of Wales Fair and Logging Show held in Thorne Bay, said that loggers viewed the show as "kind of going to a zoo and seeing a bear in a cage instead of seeing it out in the wild" and "kind of a slam on the timber industry". The Ketchikan-based Alaska Forest Association, a forestry industry group, disagreed, praising the show as allowing tourists to learn about the forestry sector's historical background.

The venue was used to host the Iron Jack and Iron Jill World Championships in 2003. By 2006, the Travel Channel had called the show Alaska's second most visited tourist attraction. The venue underwent renovations in 2013 after that season's performances had finished. The grandstand was moved to be several feet further from the Thomas Basin seawall. The show moved the accessible seating, the poles for climbing, and the logrolling pond. The aim was to move the audience nearer the performers and to improve the efficiency of moving within the venue.

The show resumed hosting the Timber Carnival, where the Ironjack contest takes place, in 2023. It had paused contests for two years owing to the COVID-19 pandemic. The Timber Carnival raises money for the Sheila June Scheer Memorial Scholarship, which helps several high school students based in Southeast Alaska. The scholarship honors founder Rob Scheer's wife; she died in 2016 of a brain aneurysm. Eight contestants vie in eight activities such as a boom run, "rigging", sawing, and wood chopping. The event gives contestants $6,000 in cash rewards. Boone Scheer, Rob Scheer's son and Sheila June Scheer's stepson, won the competition in 2016, 2017, and 2018.

== Show ==
A video of six competitions during the show in 2019: underhand chopping, axe throwing, hot sawing, woodchopping, tree climbing, and logrolling

The show has a one-hour run time and has 13 events. Shannon Sherman of the Lincoln Journal Star found the performance to be "somewhat scripted, but the competition is real". It features experienced Alaskan lumberjacks displaying a decent amount of theatricality while vying in assorted events including axe throwing, boom running, bucksawing, chainsaw carving, crosscut sawing, hot sawing, logrolling, obstacle pole racing, relay racing, speed climbing, tree climbing, tree topping, underhand chopping, and woodchopping. (Note: References for the events: For the experienced Alaskan lumberjacks displaying a decent amount of theatricality; For axe throwing; For boom running; For bucksawing; For chainsaw carving; For crosscut sawing; For hot sawing; For logrolling; For obstacle pole racing; For relay racing; For speed climbing; For tree climbing; For tree topping; For underhand chopping; For woodchopping) For tree climbing, the contestants scale a tree that is 50 feet (15 m) tall and then free fall. In another tree climbing version, they climb up a pole, equipped with only a leather strap and shoes with spiked soles. The logrolling event takes place in a pool of water that is not deep. While trying to get the other person to fall off the log first, the two lumberjacks seek to soak each other. While using complicated footwork to remain on the log, they submerge their foot and splash their adversary. Travel columnist Tom Adkinson compared their dancing to that of the dancer and singer Fred Astaire.

The competition is between two groups. One group of two lumberjacks competes for the Spruce Mill team of Ketchikan, while another group of two competes for the Dawson Creek team of the Yukon. A master of ceremonies (MC) discusses Southeast Alaska's lumber industry history. The MC announces the events and hypes up the showgoers, who depending on where they are seated root for one of either the American team or Canadian team. The lumberjacks vie to win, earning the title of Bull of the Woods. Some of the lumberjacks previously appeared on the Outdoor Channel and ESPN. The contestants use the role as an opportunity to prepare for more lucrative tournaments in other places. The MC gives a woodchip to a supporter of the team that won at the conclusion of every contest. People shouting "YoHo", a lumberjack chant, and seated close to the front could receive a reward.

When the performance ends, the lumberjacks take photos with audience members and sign autographs. The audience members can purchase more expensive tickets for additional activities. One add-on is an axe throwing contest. Another is to partake in all-you-can-eat Dungeness crab once the performance is over.

== Notable performers ==
- Mark Bouquin, who used to perform for the show, won the reality television series American Grit in 2016 with teammate Clare Painter and team leader Noah Galloway. Bouqin was a summertime resident of Ketchikan between 2008 and 2015 and spent two winters there. He graduated in 2012 from Paul Smith's College, where he took part in the woodsmen team.
- Rob Scheer, the founder and a performer for the show, is the inaugural winner of the Ironjack World Championship. Born in 1958 or 1959, Scheer grew up in Wisconsin and in his youth started participating in tree climbing and logrolling contests. For the 90-foot (27 m) pole climb, he was the world champion thrice. He included his dog, Tucker, in the show in 2004 after the dog took lessons in how to log roll.

== Analysis ==
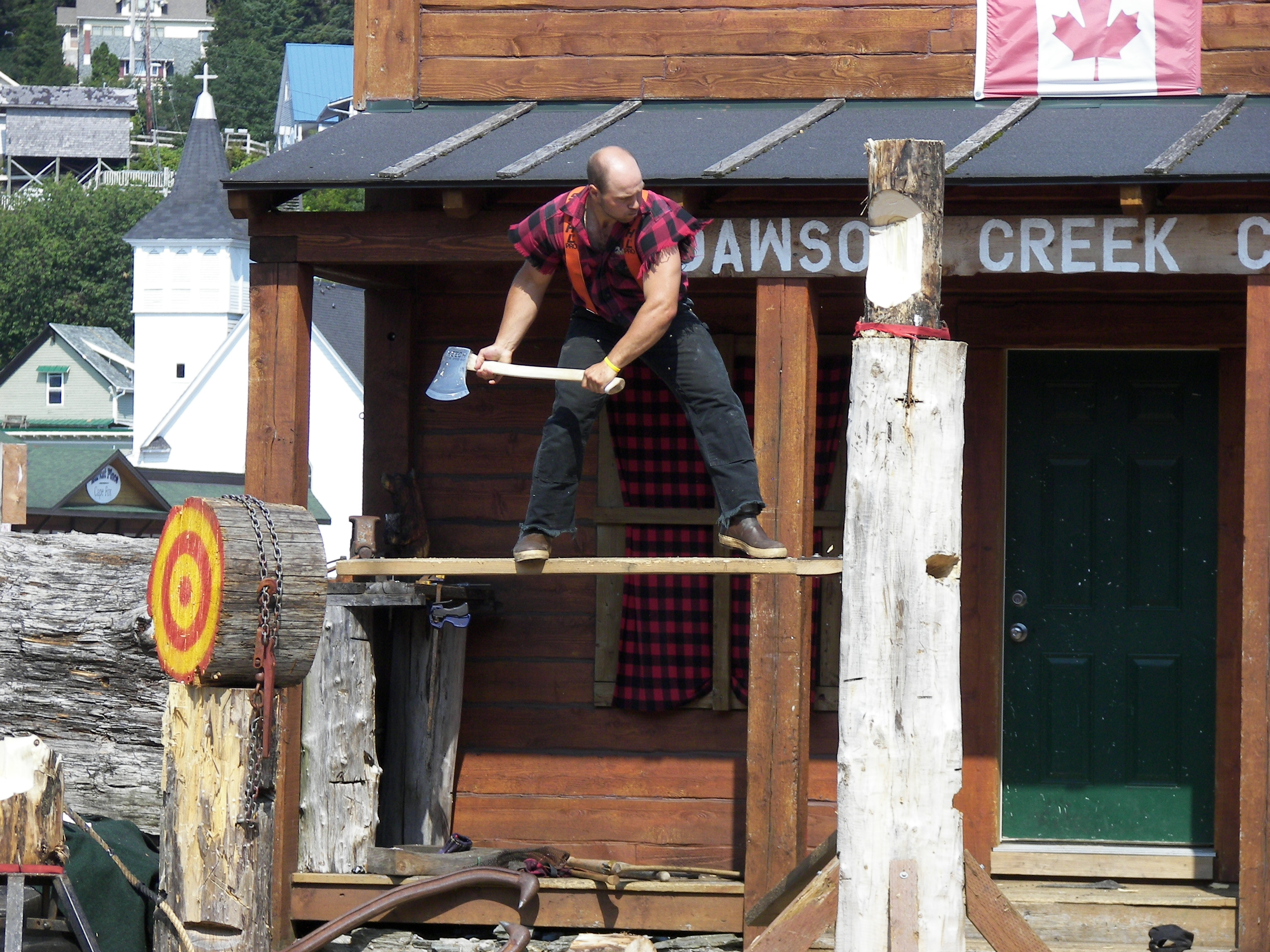
Matt Bolton, a performer, competes in the springboard chop event in 2009.

Eric Moya of Travel Weekly compared the show to the television show Hee Haw and the medieval-style dinner theater show Medieval Times. He found that there were numerous "gentle, dad-jokey puns" and audience participation through call and response. According to Moya, the show emphasized showmanship above winning. In one event, a lumberjack feigned having trouble with carving a rabbit. Within several seconds, he reshaped the flawed rabbit into a chair for kids with several adept cuts. Moya continued that he was uncertain whether lumberjacks usually wore "sleeveless flannel", though there were no reports of discontent regarding the "bare, muscular, ax-wielding arms" visible to the audience.

The scholars Thomas F. Thornton and Paraphit Wanasuk cited the Great Alaskan Lumberjack Show as an example of a cultural attraction related to natural resources that focuses on settlers to Alaska instead of on Alaska Natives. Fran Wenograd Golden and Gene Sloan of Frommer's said a lot of the character of Ketchikan they had enjoyed had disappeared owing to tourist attractions including the Great Alaskan Lumberjack Show.

== Reception ==
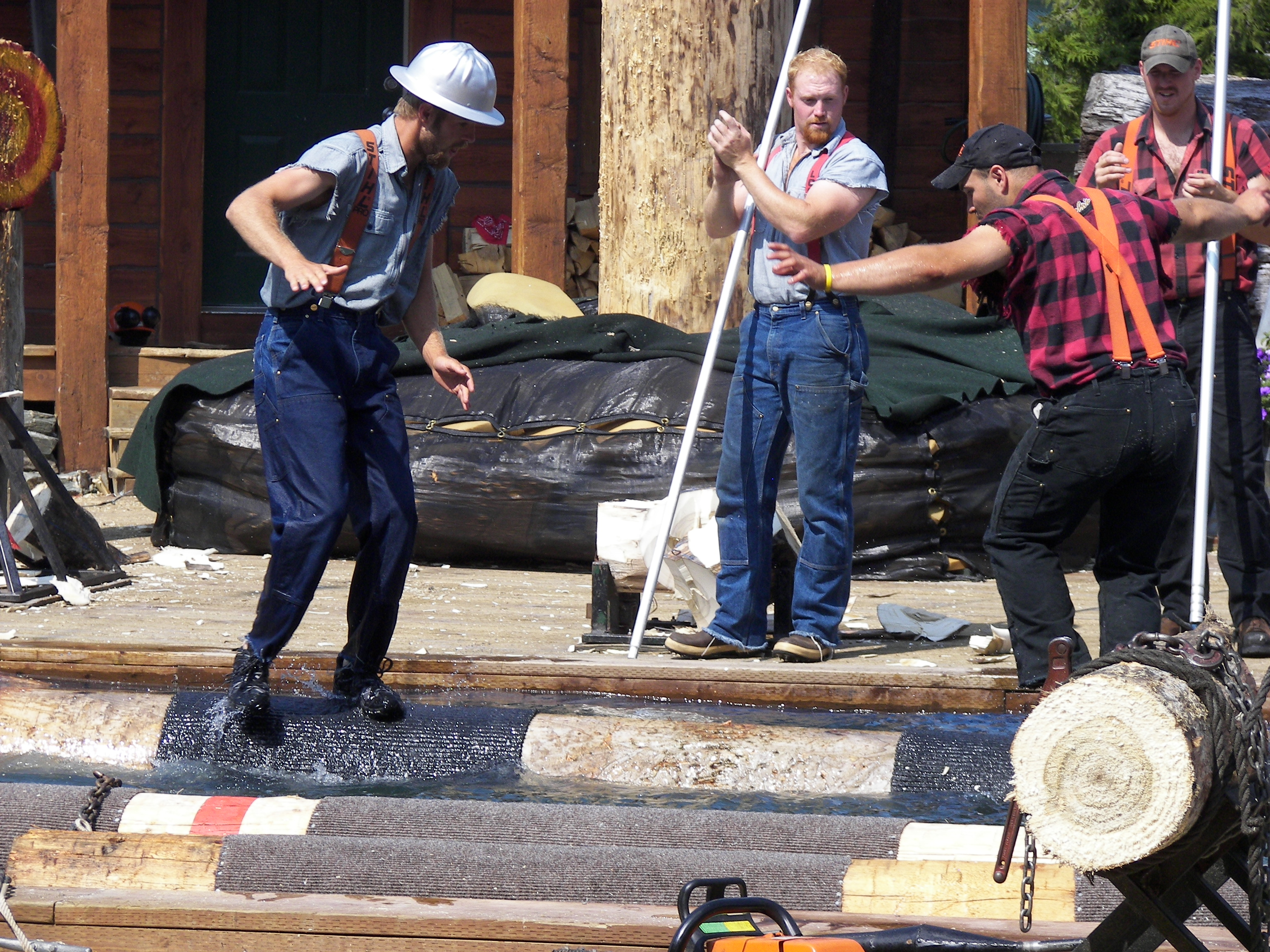
Two lumberjacks compete in the logrolling event in 2009.

Len Testa and his coauthors praised the show, writing, "The lumberjacks impress with their feats of skill, and anyone who appreciates male eye candy will be delighted". Saying the show will captivate children, Fodor's found the show to be a "Disneyesque" showcase of olden woodsman prowess and "a little hokey" yet "good fun". Moon Publications travel writer Lisa Maloney said that although the show was "corny", it was "a true competition that's a ton of fun to watch". The travel writer Carol Fowler said the show gives likely gives "historical insights" despite being "pure, corny entertainment" that viewers discuss afterwards during dinner. DK writers Deanna Swaney and Eric Amrine found that there was eager audience participation because of how enthralling the show was.

Insight Guides called the show "light-hearted and engaging", while Fodor's found it "hackneyed but always popular". Paul Whitfield, a Rough Guides author, deemed it an "extravaganza" with "the tenor of a circus sideshow". The New Zealand Herald's Nicola Lamb praised the show as being "a fun taste of the culture". She said the lumberjacks' demonstration of axe throwing and woodchopping evinces "the winning raucous style Americans do better than anybody". The Everett Herald's Jennifer Bardsley stated that the show's name should be "the Really Expensive Lumberjack Show, but at least it was entertaining".

== Bibliography ==
- Adams, Mark (2018). Tip of the Iceberg: My 3,000-Mile Journey Around Wild Alaska, the Last Great American Frontier. New York: Dutton Penguin. p. 49. ISBN 978-1-101-98510-6 – via Google Books.
- Ballas, Teekas; Besl, Joey; Cannamore, David; Deedy, Alexander; Fletcher, Amy; Smith, Danwell (2019). Sadlowski, Amanda; Becker, Kayla (eds.). Fodor's Alaska (36 ed.). New York: Fodor's. ISBN 978-1-64097-152-3. ISSN 2325-2049 – via Google Books.
- Ballas, Teekas; Besl, Joey; Coffman, Linda; Fletcher, Amy; McBeath, Chris; Sommer, Susan; Stephens, AnnaMaria (2016). Stalling, Douglas (ed.). Fodor's the Complete Guide to Alaska Cruises (2 ed.). New York: Fodor's. p. 259. ISBN 978-1-101-87966-5. ISSN 2330-4421 – via Google Books.
- Ballas, Teeka; Bodry, Catherine; Bowman, Jessica; Coffman, Linda; Heller, Carolyn; Kernaghan, Sue; McBeath, Chris; Moure, Celeste; Readicker-Henderson, Edward; Reale, Tom; Schoenbohm, Laurel; Wyatt, Sarah (2009). Kealy, Kelly (ed.). Fodor's Alaska Ports of Call 2009. New York: Fodor's. p. 167. ISBN 978-1-4000-0707-3. ISSN 1520-0205 – via Google Books.
- Brandon, Pam; Spritzer, Lois (2011). Lefkon, Wendy; Safro, Jill; Ward, Jessica (eds.). Birnbaum's Disney Cruise Line 2012. New York: Disney Enterprises, Inc. p. 201. ISBN 978-1-4231-6622-1 – via Google Books.
- Chandonnet, Ann (2006). Paull, Jennifer (ed.). Alaska's Inside Passage. New York: Fodor's. p. 39. ISBN 978-1-4000-1480-4 – via Google Books.
- Devine, Bob (2016). National Geographic Traveler: Coastal Alaska: Ports of Call and Beyond. Washington D.C.: National Geographic Society. p. 69. ISBN 978-1-4262-1635-0 – via Google Books.
- DuFresne, Jim; Bodry, Catherine; Kelly, Robert (2012) [1983]. Alaska (10 ed.). Oakland, California: Lonely Planet. p. 84. ISBN 978-1-74179-696-4 – via Internet Archive.
- Fowler, Carol (2009). Explorer's Guide Alaska Panhandle: A Great Destination. Woodstock, Vermont: The Countryman Press. p. 122. ISBN 978-1-58157-095-3 – via Google Books.
- Golden, Fran Wenograd; Sloan, Gene (2015). Prommer, Pauline (ed.). Frommer's EasyGuide to Alaskan Cruises and Ports of Call. New York: Frommer's. p. 192. ISBN 978-1-62887-096-1 – via Internet Archive.
- Insight Guides Pocket Alaska Ports of Call (2 ed.). London: Insight Guides. 2018. ISBN 978-1-78671-967-6 – via Google Books.
- Kernaghan, Sue; Klurman, Melissa; Pitcher, Don; Sper, Sarah (2004). Bhoman, Mary Beth (ed.). Fodor's Alaska Ports of Call (6 ed.). New York: Fodor's. p. 156. ISBN 1-4000-1306-2. ISSN 1520-0205 – via Internet Archive.
- Kirkland, Erin (2014). Alaska on the Go: Exploring the 49th State with Children. Fairbanks, Alaska: University of Alaska Press. pp. 214–215. ISBN 978-1-60223-221-1 – via Google Books.
- Maloney, Lisa (2017). Ehart, Kimberly (ed.). Moon Alaska. Berkeley, California: Moon Publications. p. 50. ISBN 978-1-63121-497-4 – via Google Books.
- Miller, M. Mike (2008) [1983]. Alaska's Southeast: Touring the Inside Passage (11 ed.). Guilford, Connecticut: Morris Communications. p. 145. ISBN 978-0-7627-4535-7. ISSN 1545-1941 – via Google Books.
- Readicker-Henderson, Ed; Readicker-Henderson, Lynn (2009). Adventure Guide to Coastal Alaska and the Inside Passage. Edison, New Jersey: Hunter Publishing. p. 154. ISBN 978-1-58843-153-0 – via Google Books.
- Sarna, Heidi; Hannafin, Matt (2007). Cruise Vacations For Dummies 2007. Hoboken, New Jersey: Wiley. p. 394. ISBN 978-0-471-78863-8 – via Google Books.
- Swaney, Deanna; Amrine, Eric (2010) [2006]. Bhanot, Arundhti (ed.). DK Eyewitness Travel Guide: Alaska. New York: DK. p. 128. ISBN 978-0-75666-199-1. ISSN 1542-1554 – via Google Books.
- Testa, Len; Foster, Erin; Stewart, Laurel; Halphen, Ritchey (2017). Bailey, Lisa C. (ed.). The Unofficial Guide to Disney Cruise Line 2017. Birmingham, Alabama: The Unofficial Guides. pp. 346–347. ISBN 978-1-62809-064-2 – via Internet Archive.
- Thornton, Thomas F.; Wanasuk, Paraphit (2016). "Indigenous tourism as a sustainable social-environmental enterprise: the political ecology of tourism in Southeast Alaska". In Nepal, Sanjay; Saarinen, Jarkko (eds.). Political Ecology and Tourism. London: Routledge. p. 24. ISBN 978-1-138-85246-4 – via Google Books.
- Whitfield, Paul (2004). Cranmer, Jeff (ed.). The Rough Guide to Alaska (2 ed.). New York: Rough Guides. p. 87. ISBN 1-84353-258-1 – via Google Books.
