= Lumberjack =

Worker who performs the initial harvesting of trees

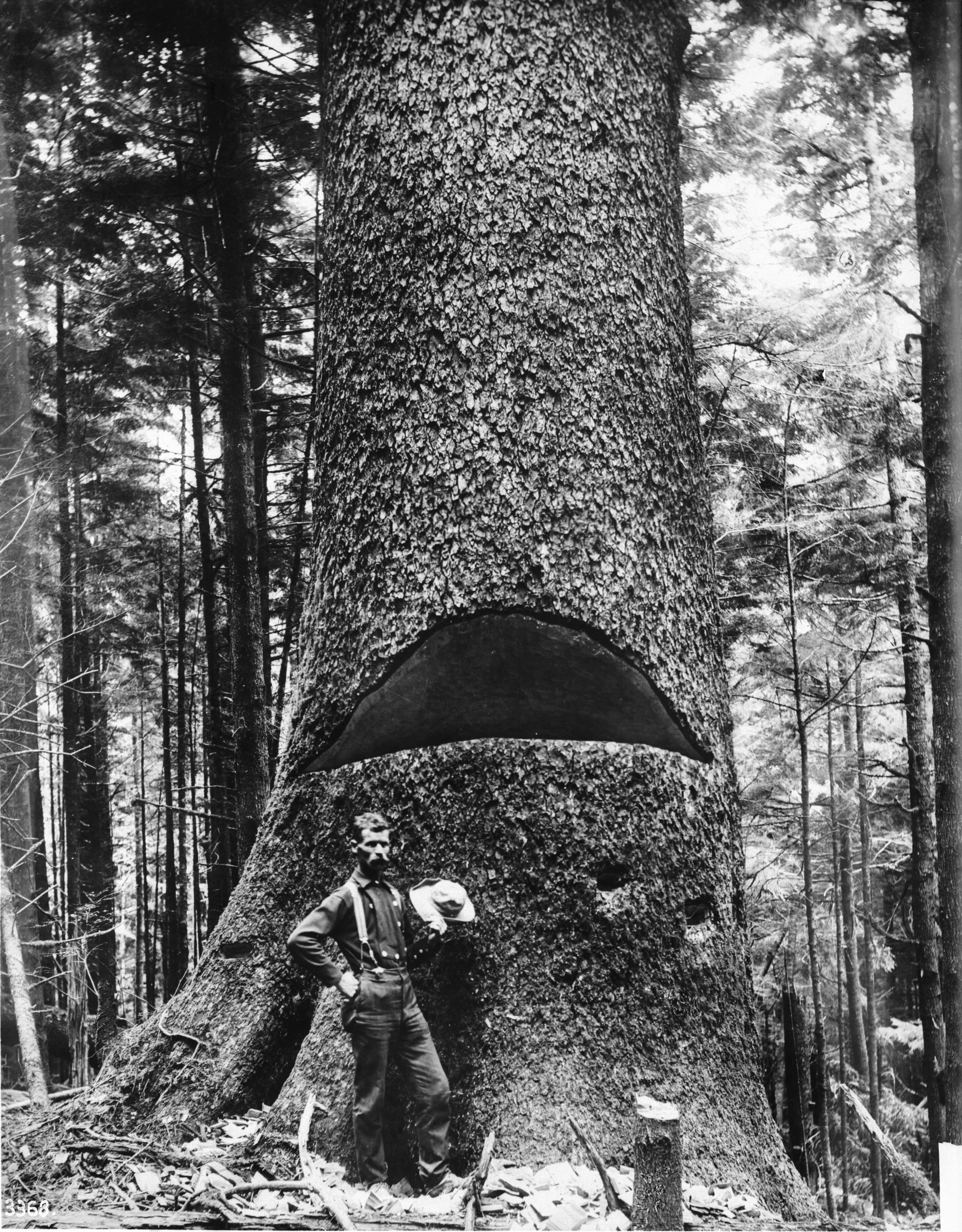
A lumberjack c. 1900

Lumberjack is a mostly North American term for workers in the logging industry who perform the initial harvesting and transport of trees. The term usually refers to loggers in the era before 1945 in the United States, when trees were felled using hand tools and dragged by oxen to rivers.

The work was difficult, dangerous, intermittent, low-paying, and involved living in primitive conditions. However, the men built a traditional culture that celebrated strength, masculinity, confrontation with danger, and resistance to modernization.

== Etymology ==
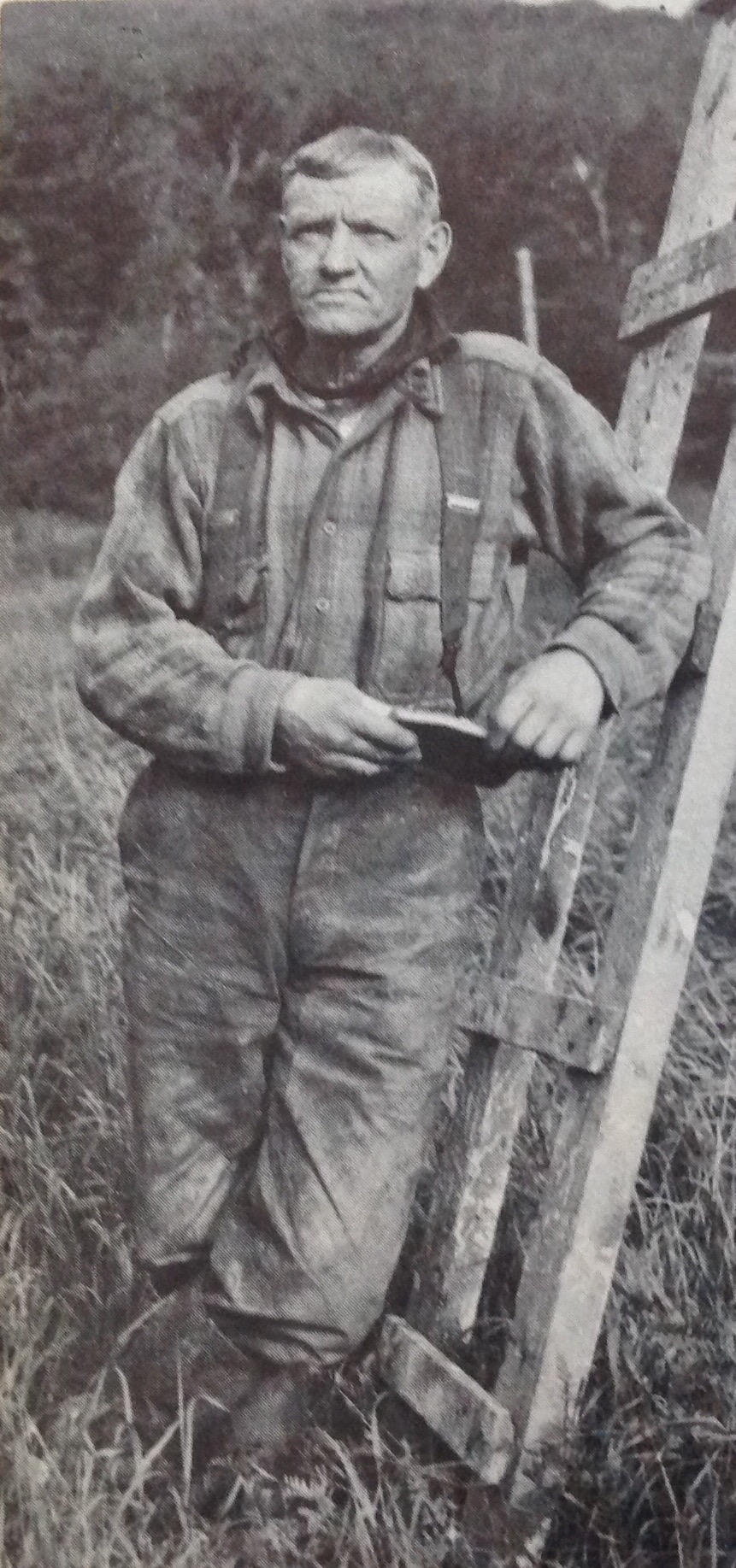
Jigger Johnson (d. 1935), the fabled Maine woodsman whom historians Stewart Holbrook and Robert E. Pike call "the last lumberjack"

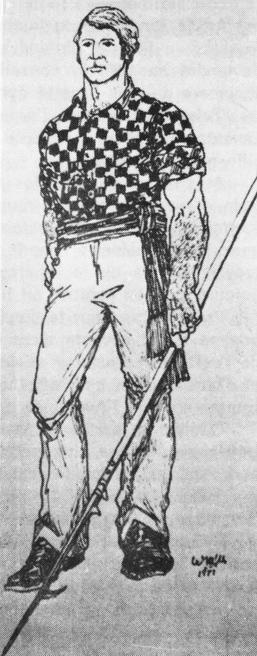
Joseph Montferrand, legendary Canadian lumberjack

The term lumberjack is of Canadian derivation. The first attested use of the term combining its two components comes from an 1831 letter to the Cobourg, Ontario, Star and General Advertiser in the following passage: "my misfortunes have been brought upon me chiefly by an incorrigible, though perhaps useful, race of mortals called lumberjacks, whom, however, I would name the Cossacks of Upper Canada, who, having been reared among the oaks and pines of the wild forest, have never been subjected to the salutary restraint of laws."

The term lumberjack is primarily historical, and of colloquial contemporary usage; logger is commonly used by workers in the 21st century. When lumberjack is used, it usually refers to a logger from an earlier time before the advent of chainsaws, feller-bunchers and other modern logging equipment. Other terms for the occupation include woodcutter, shanty boy and the regional woodhick of Pennsylvania, United States. In Australia, the occupation is referred to as timber cutter or cool cutters.

A logger employed in driving logs down a river was known locally in northern North America as a river pig, river hog, river rat, or catty-man. The term lumberjill has been used for a woman lumberjack; for example, the Women's Timber Corps in Britain during World War II.

== History ==
=== Lifestyle ===
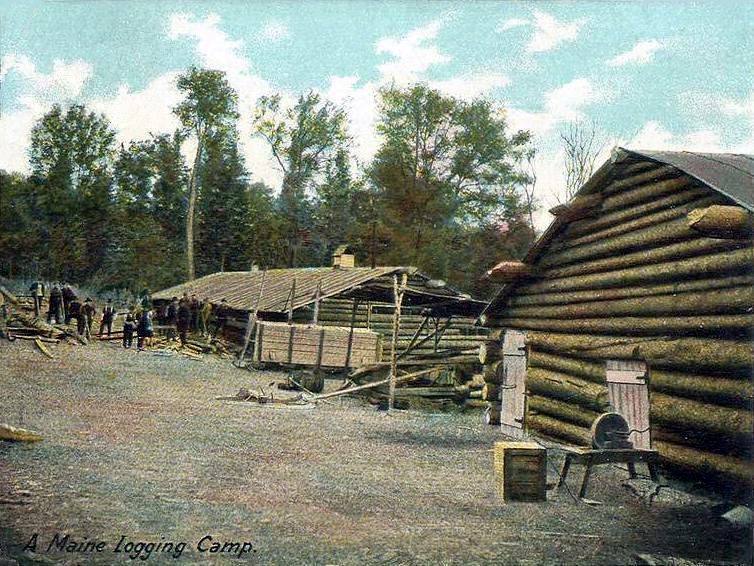
A Maine logging camp in 1906

Lumberjacks worked in lumber camps and often lived a migratory life, following timber harvesting jobs as they opened. Being a lumberjack was seasonal work. Lumberjacks were exclusively men. They usually lived in bunkhouses or tents. Common equipment included the axe and cross-cut saw. Lumberjacks could be found wherever there were vast forests to be harvested and a demand for wood, most likely in Scandinavia, Canada, and parts of the United States. In the U.S., many lumberjacks were of Scandinavian ancestry, continuing the family tradition. American lumberjacks were first centred in north-eastern states such as Maine. They then followed the general westward migration on the continent to the Upper Midwest, and finally the Pacific Northwest. Stewart Holbrook documented the emergence and westward migration of the classic American lumberjack in his first book, Holy Old Mackinaw: A Natural History of the American Lumberjack. He often wrote colourfully about lumberjacks in his subsequent books, romanticizing them as hard-drinking, hard-working men. Logging camps were slowly phased out between World War II and the early 1960s as crews could by then be transported to remote logging sites in motor vehicles.

=== Division of labor ===
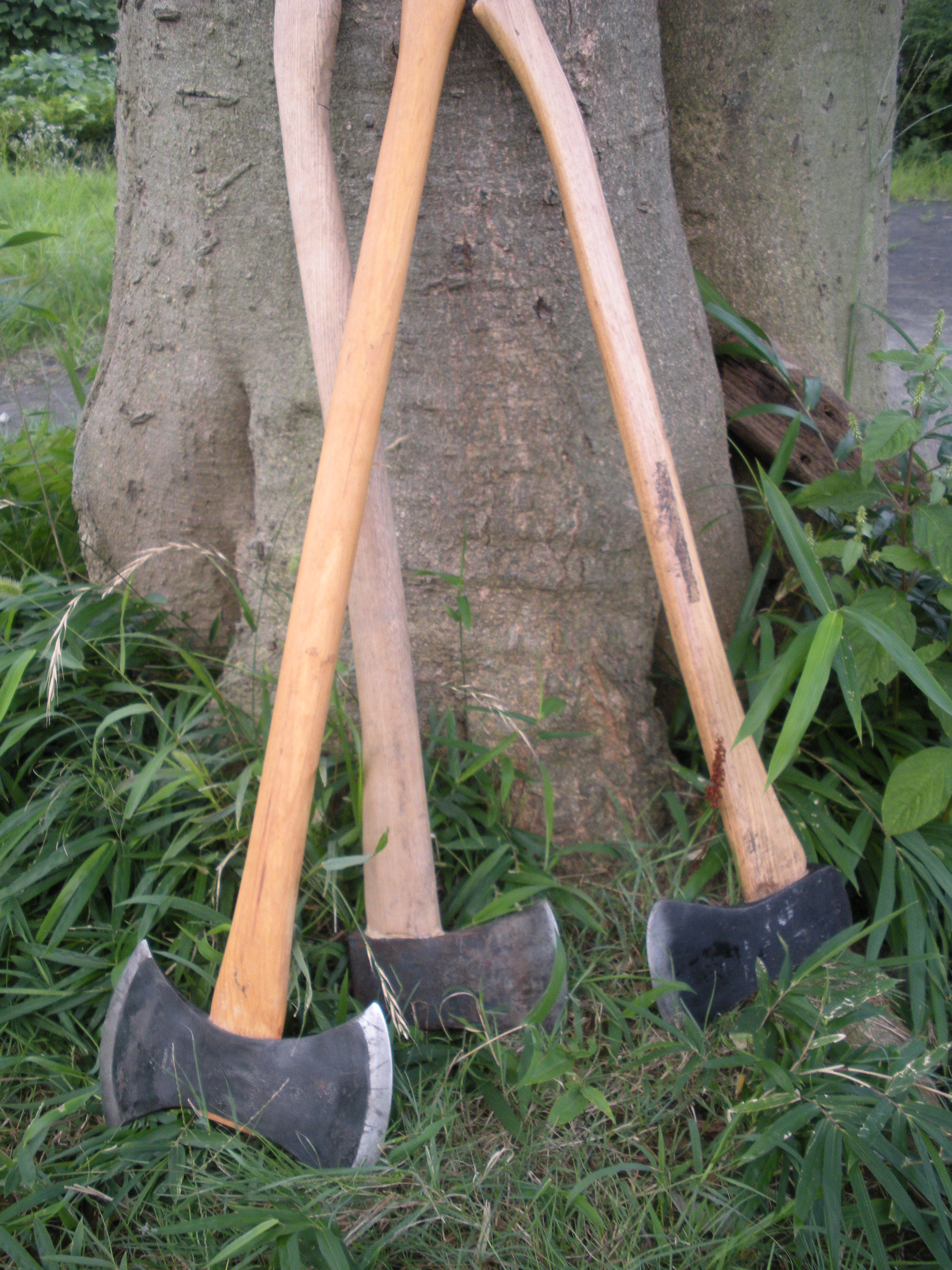
Felling axes

Despite the common perception that all loggers cut trees, the actual felling and bucking of trees were specialized job positions done by fallers and buckers. Faller and bucker were once two separate job titles, but they are now combined.

The natural division of labour in lumber camps led to other specialized jobs on logging crews, such as whistle punk, high climber, and chaser. The whistle punk's job was to sound a whistle (usually at the Steam donkey) as a signal to the yarder operator controlling the movement of logs. He also had to act as a safety lookout. A good whistle punk had to be alert and think fast as others' safety depended on him. The high climber (also known as a tree topper) established a spar tree so logs could be skidded into the landing. Using tree climbing gaffs and rope to ascend a tall tree in the landing area of the logging site, he would chop off limbs as he climbed, chop off the top of the tree, then attach pulleys and rigging to the tree for the yarder. High climbers and whistle punks began to be phased out in the 1960s to early 1970s when portable steel towers began to replace spar trees and radio equipment supplemented whistles for communication. The choker setters attached steel cables (or chokers) to downed logs so they could be dragged into the landing by the yarder, and still do today. The chasers remove the chokers once the logs are at the landing. Choker setters and chasers are often entry-level positions on logging crews, with more experienced loggers seeking to move up to more skill-intensive positions such as yarder operator or supervisory positions such as hook tender.

=== Machinery ===
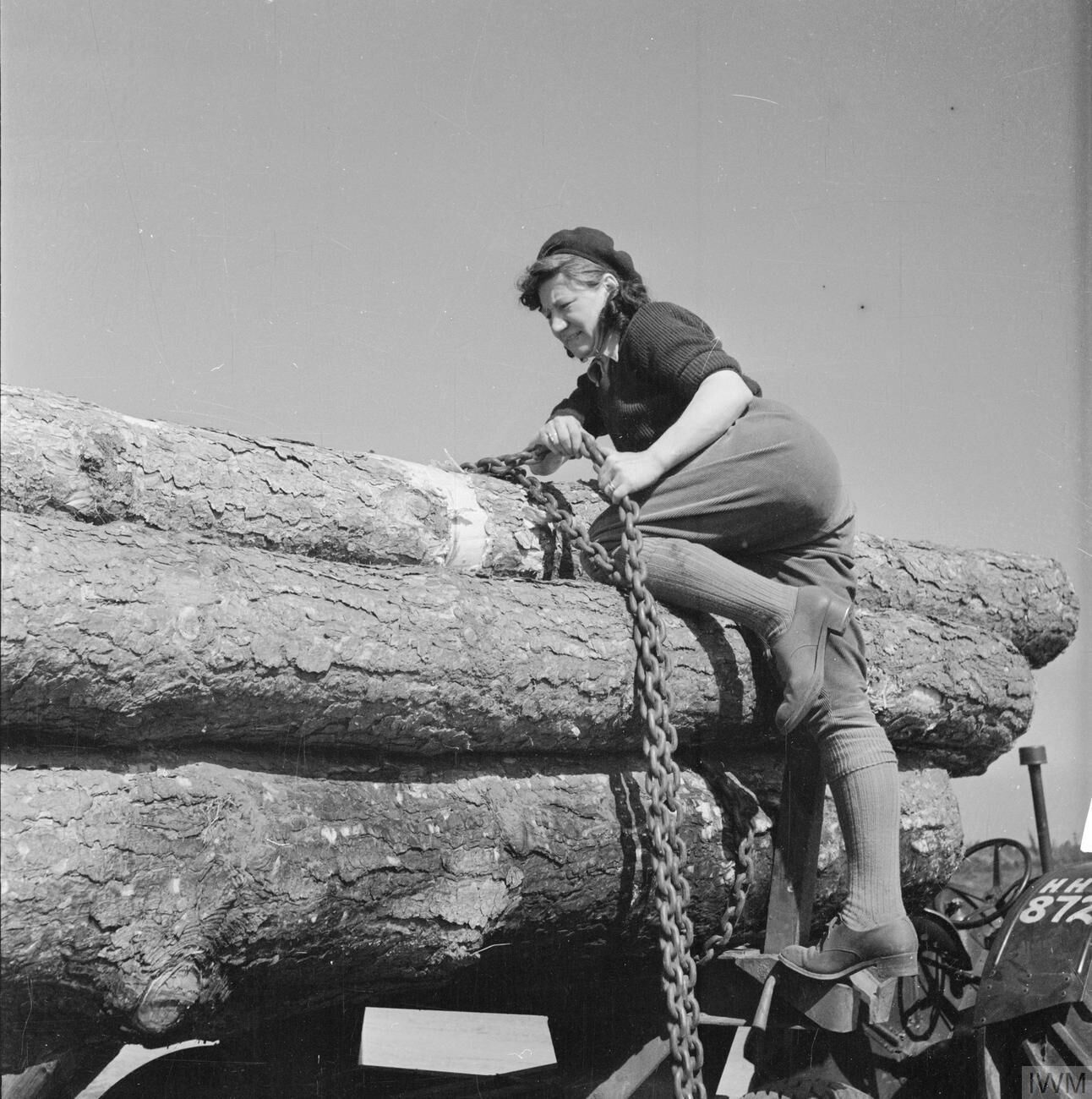
A lumberjack chaining logs to a wagon, c. 1943.

Before the era of modern diesel or gasoline powered equipment, the existing machinery was steam powered. Animal or steam-powered skidders could be used to haul harvested logs to nearby rail roads for shipment to sawmills. Horse driven logging wheels were a means used for moving logs out of the woods. Another way for transporting logs to sawmills was to float them down a body of water or a specially-constructed log flume. Log rolling, the art of staying on top of a floating log while "rolling" the log by walking, was another skill much in demand among lumberjacks. Spiked boots known as "caulks" or "corks" were used for log rolling and often worn by lumberjacks as their regular footwear.

The term "skid row", which today means a poor city neighbourhood frequented by homeless people, derives from a way harvested logs were once transported. Logs would be "skidded" down hills or along a corduroy road. One such street in Seattle was named Skid Road. This street later became frequented by people down on their luck, and both the name and its meaning morphed into the modern term.

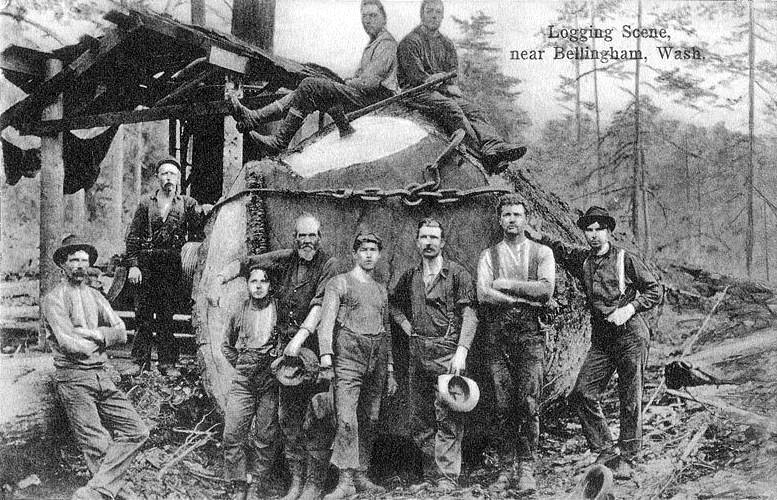
Lumberjacks near Bellingham, Washington, c. 1910

Among the living history museums that preserve and interpret the forest industry are:

- BC Forest Discovery Centre, Duncan
- Camp Five Museum, Laona, Wisconsin
  - The Lumberjack Steam Train, a passenger excursion train, operates as part of the museum.
- Central New Brunswick Woodsmen's Museum, Boiestown, New Brunswick
- Coos County Logging Museum, Myrtle Point, Oregon
- Cradle of Forestry in America historic site, near Asheville, North Carolina
- Forest History Center, Grand Rapids, Minnesota
- Hartwick Pines Logging Museum, near Grayling, Michigan
- Lumberman's Monument, near Oscoda, Michigan
- Maine Forest & Logging Museum, Bradley, Maine
- Pennsylvania Lumber Museum, near Galeton, Pennsylvania
- Algonquin Logging Museum in Algonquin Provincial Park, Ontario

== Culture ==
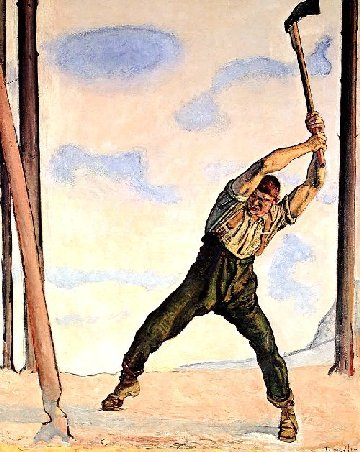
Lumberjack, painting by Ferdinand Hodler, 1910

Tomczik (2008) has investigated the lifestyle of lumberjacks from 1840 to 1940, using records from mostly Maine and Minnesota logging camps. In a period of industrial development and modernization in urban areas, logging remained a traditional business in which the workers exhibited pride in their craft, masculinity, and closely-guarded individualism. Their camps were a bastion of the traditional workplace, as they intentionally defied modern rationalized management. At the peak in 1906 there were 500,000 lumberjacks. Logging camps were located in isolated areas that provided room and board as well as a workplace. There were usually few women present other than the wives of cooks and foremen. Men earned praise for their skill, competitiveness, and aggression. When not at work, they played rough games, told tall tales, and built up their reputations by consuming large amounts of food. By 1940, the business was undergoing major changes, as access roads and automobiles ended residential logging camps, chain saws replaced crosscut saws, and managers installed industrial methods of logging.

== Evolution ==
=== Tie hacking ===
A specialty form of logging involving the felling of trees for the production of railroad ties was known as tie hacking. These lumberjacks, called tie hacks, used saws to fell trees and cut to length, and a broad-axe to flatten two or all four sides of the log to create railroad ties. Later, portable saw mills were used to cut and shape ties. Tie hacking was an important form of logging in Wyoming and northern Colorado and the remains of tie hacking camps can be found on National Forest land. The remains of flumes can be seen near Dubois, Wyoming, and Old Roach, Colorado. In addition, a decaying splash dam exists near the Old Roach site as well. There, tie hacks attempted to float logs down to the Laramie River for the annual spring tie drives, and the splash dam was used to collect winter snow-melt to increase the water flow for the tie drive.

=== Modern technology ===
Modern technology changed the job of the modern logger considerably. Although the basic task of harvesting trees is still the same, the machinery and tasks are no longer the same. Many of the old job specialties on logging crews are now obsolete.

Chainsaws, harvesters, and feller bunchers are now used to cut or fell trees. The tree is turned into logs by removing the limbs (delimbing) and cutting it into logs of optimal length (bucking). The felled tree or logs are moved from the stump to the landing. Ground vehicles such as a skidder or forwarder can pull, carry, or shovel the logs. Cable systems "cars" can pull logs to the landing. Logs can also be flown to the landing by helicopter. Logs are commonly transported to the sawmill using trucks. Harvesting methods may include clear cutting or selective cutting. Concerns over the environmental impact have led to controversy about modern logging practices. In certain areas of forest loggers re-plant their crop for future generations.

A Wall Street Journal survey on the best jobs in the United States ended by listing being a logger as the "worst" 3D's job, citing "work instability, poor income, and pure danger". According to a Wall St. review studying the 71 most dangerous jobs, the most dangerous job was identified as that of logging workers in 2020.

== Safety ==
Lumberjacks and loggers have one of the most dangerous jobs in the United States. The constant danger of being around heavy equipment and chainsaws in unsafe areas maximizes the danger. Proper protective equipment consists of eye protection, head protection, ear protection, long sleeves, chaps (if working with a chainsaw), and steel toe boots. When entering this profession, it is emphasized to be on one's toes because individuals are responsible for their own safety to guard against many uncontrollable hazards in the timber. For example, the weather can cause a dangerous situation quicker than one may realize. Additionally, logs and trees often plummet down a mountainside. In the United States, the Occupational Safety and Health Administration (OSHA) has resources dedicated for logging safety, and the National Institute for Occupational Safety and Health (NIOSH) has identified logging as a priority area of safety research under the National Occupational Research Agenda.

== Loggersports ==
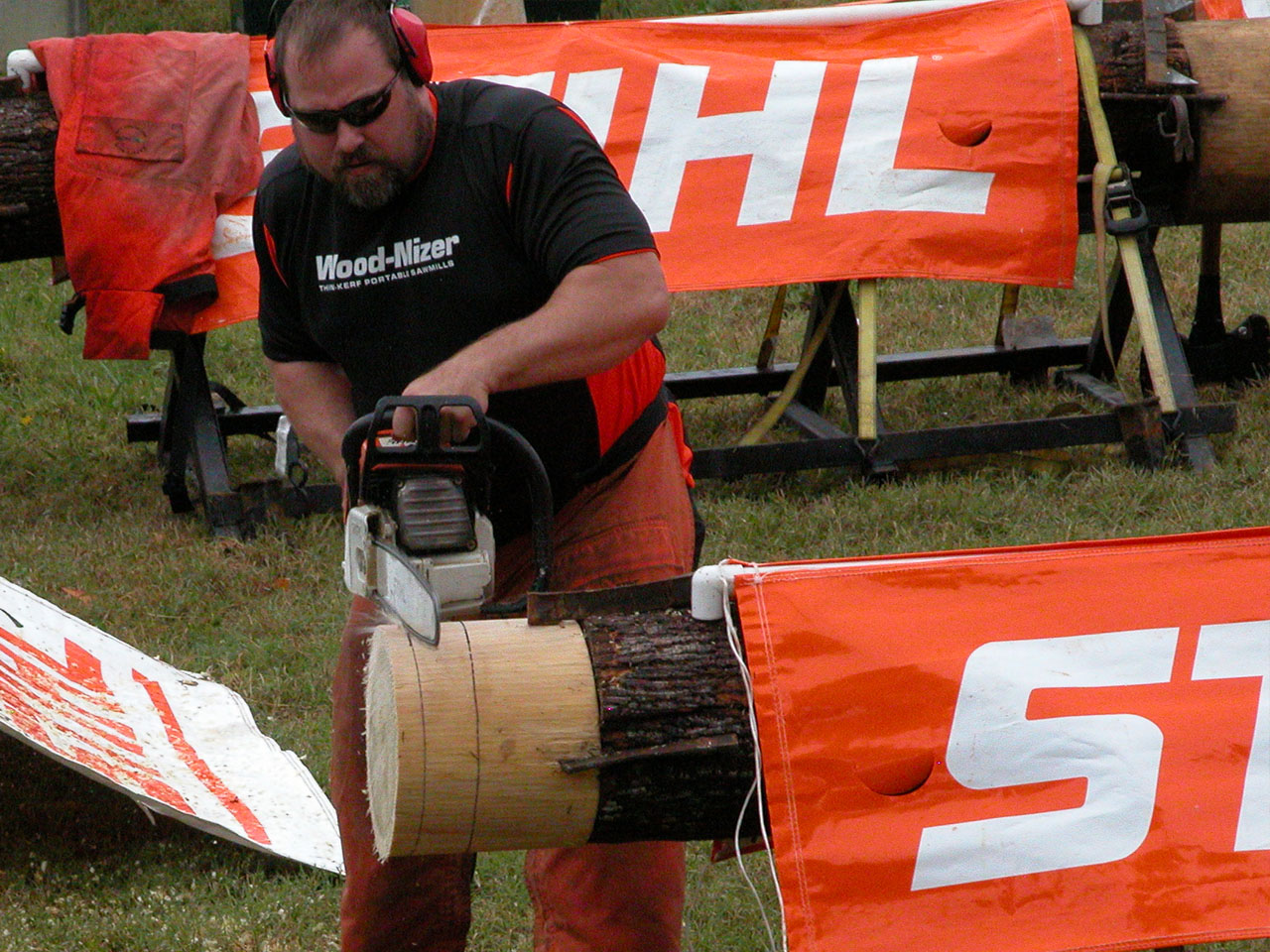
Double cut competition at the Lexington Barbecue Festival

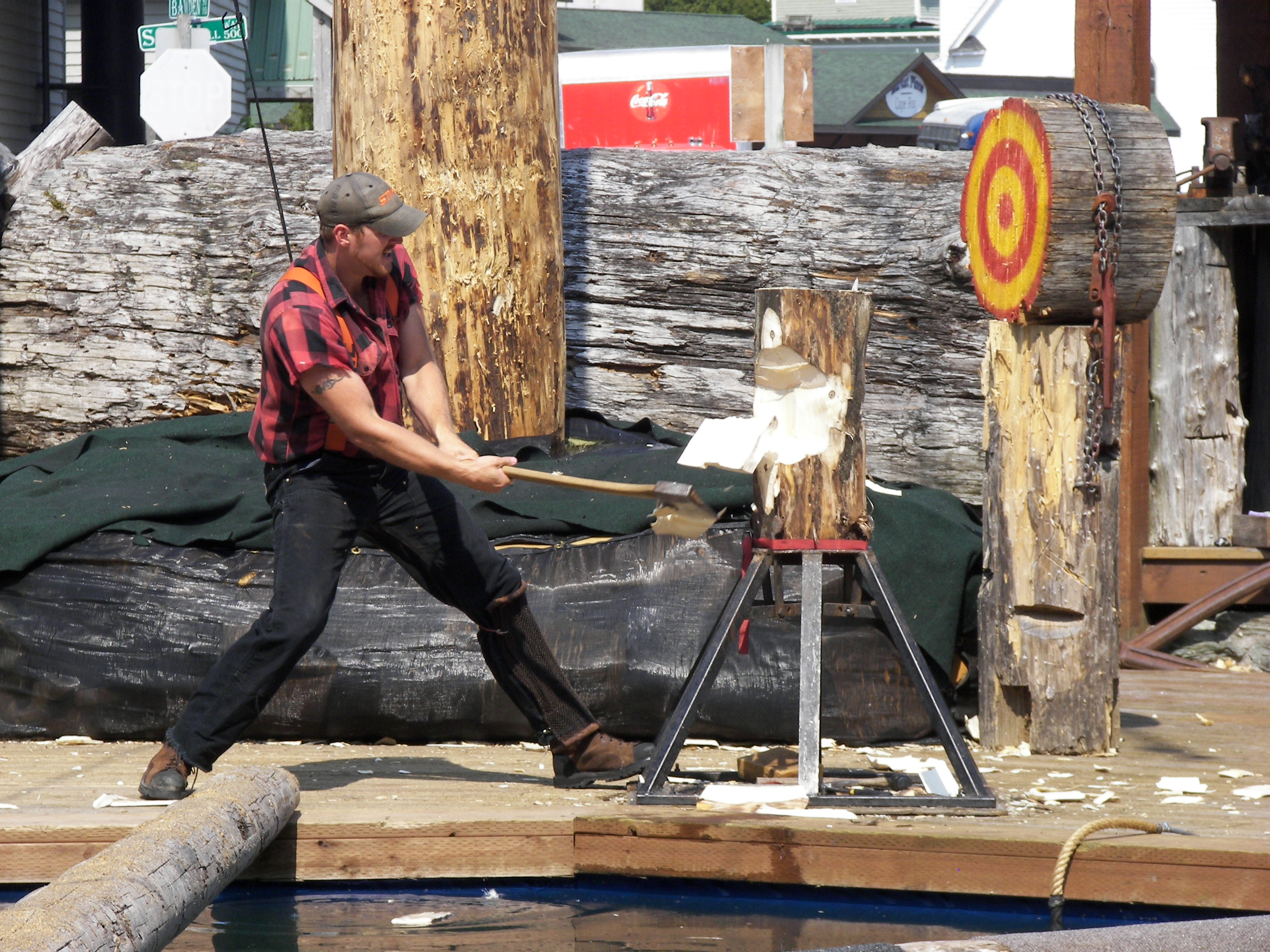
Standing block chop event at the Great Alaskan Lumberjack Show

The sport of Loggersports grew out of competitions in lumber camps aimed at determining the best woodcutters. Today, these competitions are used to acknowledge the rich history of forestry and logging and to keep traditions alive.

STIHL Timbersports Series – Worldwide

The STIHL Timbersports Series was founded in 1985, and brings competitors from across the world to compete in six woodsman or wood chopping competitions. The events are broadcast worldwide on a variety of networks, including ESPN, ABC, and Eurosport.

Squamish Days Loggers Sports – Canada

In Canada, Squamish Days Loggers Sports in Squamish, British Columbia, attracts the finest competitors to its weekend festival in August each year. The event has entertainers such as Johnny Cash, who, in 1991, performed at the 5,000-seat Loggers Sports grounds during his Roadshow tour.

The Woodsmen's Days – New York, United States

The Woodsmen's Days events at Tupper Lake, New York commemorate the lumberjack with logging competitions and demonstrations during mid-July. Many colleges have woodsmen teams or forestry clubs who compete regionally, nationally, and internationally. The Association of Southern Forestry Clubs, for example, sponsors an annual Forestry Conclave with 250 contestants and a variety of events.

Lumberjack Tours – United States

There are also lumberjack shows which tour the United States, demonstrating traditional logging practices to the general public. The annual Lumberjack World Championships have been held in Hayward, Wisconsin since 1960. Over 12,000 visitors come to the event each year in late July to watch men and women compete in 21 different events, including log rolling, chopping, timed hot (power) and bucksaw cutting, and tree climbing.

== Lumberjack fashion ==
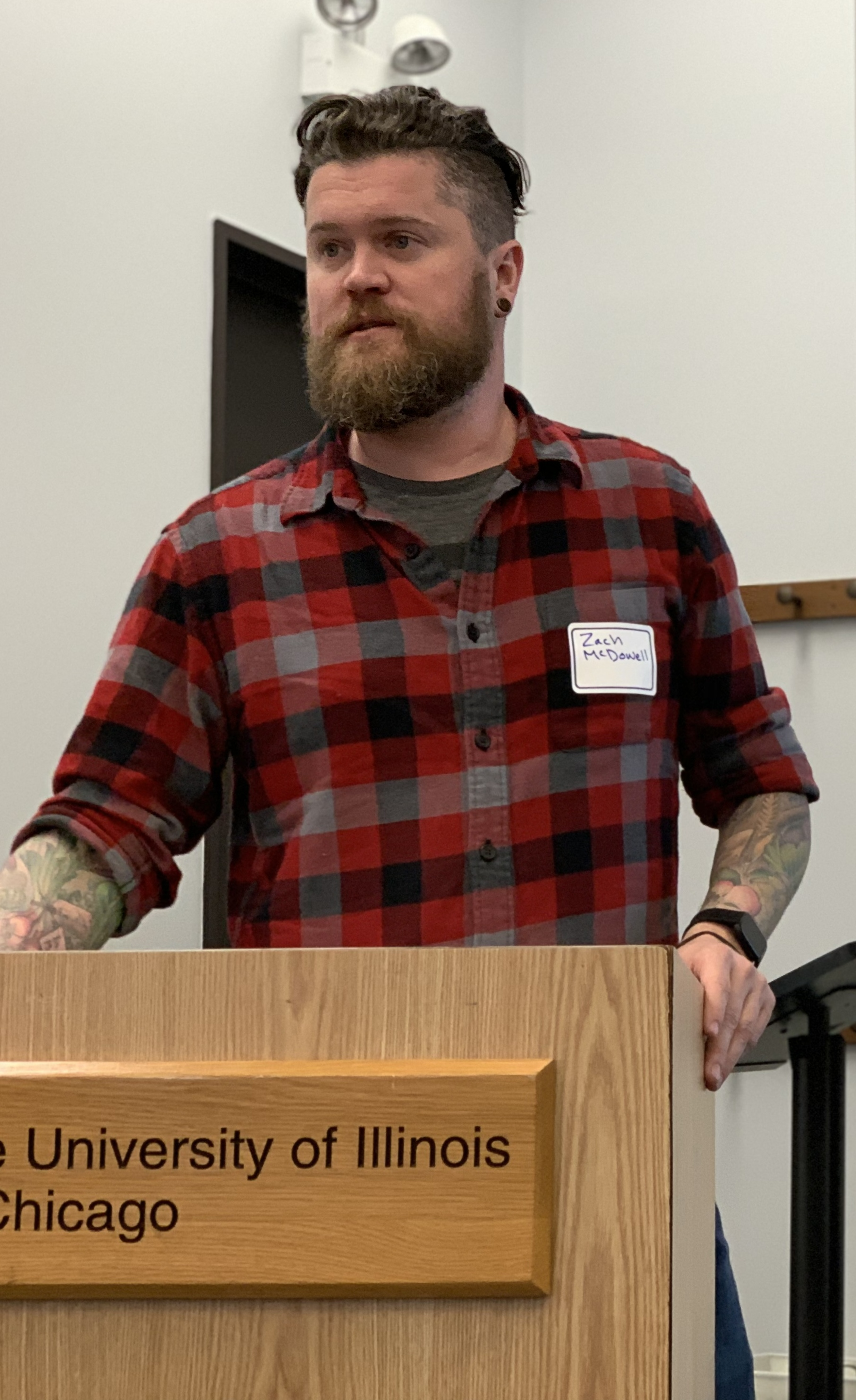
Example of urban lumberjack fashion

In 2014, the term "lumbersexual" emerged in online culture due to an observation that outdoor gear was used because of its aesthetics, not function. Whereas similar terms such as "the Urban Woodsman" existed since 2012, the term "lumbersexual" became popular in fashion magazines and online outlets during 2015 and 2016.

The term "lumbersexual" is a near antonymous play on the earlier "metrosexual", a metropolitan-heterosexual man who values appearances, apparel and aesthetics. Unlike the metrosexual, the lumbersexual is a man who adopted the stylistic traits of outdoor gear, namely a beard, plaid shirt, and work boots, in urban environments.

Media reports show lumbersexuals adorned by neck and sleeve tattoos. Whereas commentators discussed whether the lumbersexual is an attempt to "reclaim masculinity", researchers show that the term is a media representation that very few people actually use for self-identification.

== Popular culture ==
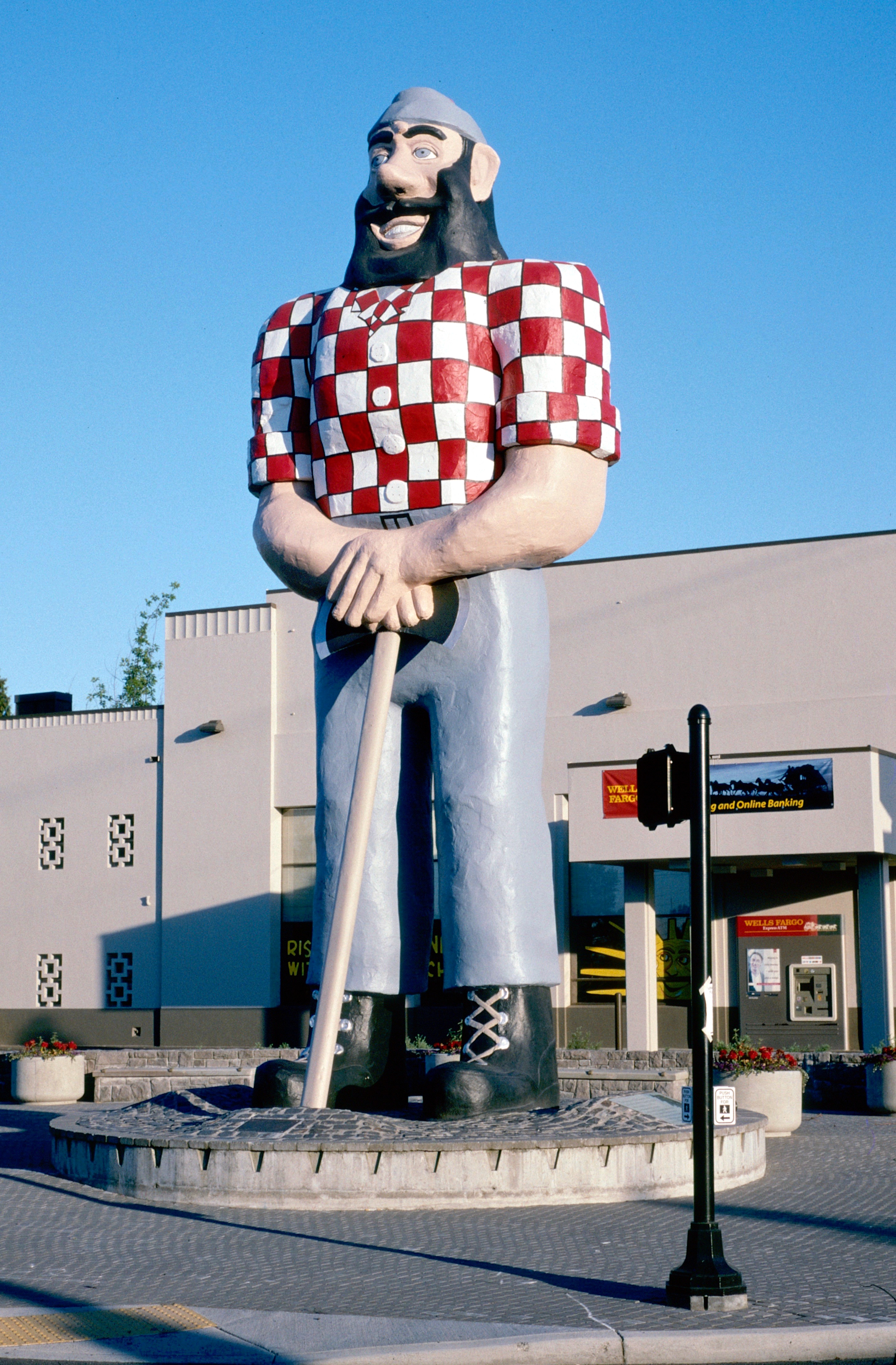
Statue of Paul Bunyan (Portland, Oregon), listed on the National Register of Historic Places

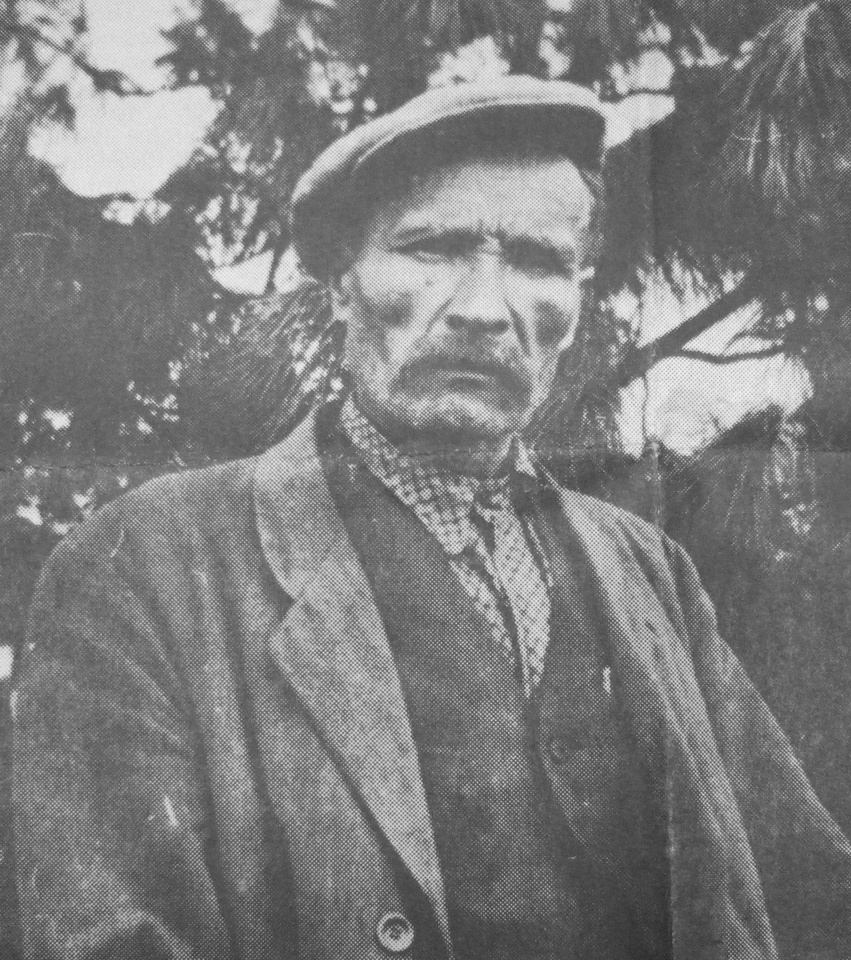
"Nätti-Jussi" ("Pretty-John") was a legendary Finnish forest laborer and lumberjack. The stories told by Nätti made him a very famous figure, particularly in Lapland.

In popular culture, the stereotypical lumberjack is a strong, burly, usually bearded man who lives to brave the natural environment. He is depicted as wearing suspenders, a long-sleeved plaid flannel shirt, and heavy spiked caulk boots, and is often characterized as having a voracious appetite, especially for flapjacks. He works by cutting down trees with either an axe or with the help of another lumberjack and a crosscut saw, as opposed to the modern chainsaw.

The Portland Timbers of Major League Soccer have had two men portraying lumberjack "mascots" in their franchise history: Jim Serrill, AKA "Timber Jim", NASL: 1978–1981/USL: 2001–2008, as well as Joe Webber ("Timber Joey"), who took over for Serrill later in 2008, continuing after the team entered MLS in 2011, and remaining in that role, cutting logs after goals scored by the team at its longtime home of Providence Park, ever since then.

=== Folklore ===
The most famous depiction of a lumberjack in folklore is Paul Bunyan. Several towns claim to have been Paul Bunyan's home and have constructed statues of Bunyan and his blue ox "Babe".

Men such as Jigger Johnson, the Maine woodsman who supposedly kicked knots off frozen logs barefooted, and Joseph Montferrand (better known as Big Joe Mufferaw), the French-Canadian known for his physical prowess and desire to protect the French-speaking logger, have been celebrated as folk heroes throughout North America, and have contributed to the myths of the lumberjack.

=== Music ===
==== Songs ====
- Lumberjacks rapidly developed their own distinctive musical culture of work songs. Many were based on traditional European folk tunes, with lyrics that reflected the lives, experiences and concerns of lumberjacks, with the themes of cutting, hauling, rolling, and driving, as well as narrative songs that involved romance.
- Big Joe Mufferaw, a song recorded and performed by Stompin' Tom Connors, one of Canada's most prolific and well-known country and folk singer-songwriters, about legendary folk hero Joseph Montferrand, a French-Canadian logger. This song appears on the album Stompin' Tom Meets Big Joe Mufferaw (1970), on the live album Live At The Horseshoe (1971), and on the album Move Along With Stompin' Tom (1999).
- The Log Driver's Waltz, a 1956 song by Wade Hemsworth on his album Folk Songs of the Canadian North Woods
- Lumberjack, a 1960 song by Johnny Cash on his album Ride This Train
- The Lumberjack, a song by Hal Willis
- The Lumberjack, a song featuring a chainsaw solo, by the American rock band Jackyl
- The Lumberjack Song, a song by Monty Python, known for its refrain: "I'm a lumberjack and I'm okay / I sleep all night and I work all day. ..."

== See also ==
- Arborist
- Log boom
- Log driving
- Log scaler
- Glossary of lumberjack jargon
