= Lumberjack World Championship =

Annual timbersports competition in Wisconsin, U.S.

Lumberjack World Championships

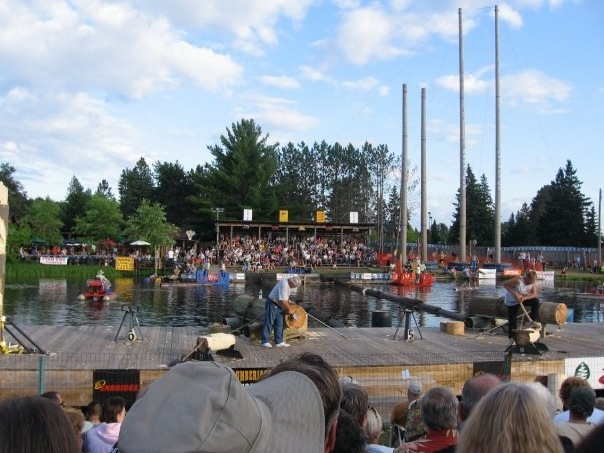
- The competition venue in 2010.
- Date: July 16, 17, 18, 2026
- Frequency: Annually
- Venue: Lumberjack Bowl
- Location: Hayward, Wisconsin
- Coordinates: 46°0′19.6268″N 91°28′36.8929″W
- Inaugurated: 1960
- Founder: Tony Wise
- Most recent: 16, 17, 18 July 2026
- Next event: July 2027
- Participants: 100+
- Attendance: 12,000+
- Capacity: 5,000
- Website: lumberjackworldchampionships.com

The Lumberjack World Championships are held annually in Hayward, Wisconsin. The three-day event began in 1960 and is held at Lumberjack Bowl, an original holding pond for logs, in front of an estimated 12,000 spectators. There are 21 events for both men and women to compete for over $75,000 in prize money. Contestants come from a wide variety of countries, including Canada, Ireland, Australia, Wales, Czech Republic, Spain, Japan, Belgium, New Zealand, Italy, Norway, Germany, and the United States (with over 30 states being represented each year). The events include sawing, chopping, logrolling, and climbing to test the strength and agility of over 100 competitors.

The 2026 competition finals began with a haze of smoke from the devastating Canadian wildfires on the first day of competition, but the winds shifted and the event went on without consequence. The finals were successfully continued the following two days with a crowd of competitors and spectators enjoying three world records fall.

The 2026 competition saw the largest group of countries ever assembled, with the number of male and female timber athletes growing ever closer to an even representation. European jacks and jills are increasingly enjoying the thrill of competing at Lumberjack Bowl and giving their American counterparts a run for the prize money.

The 67th annual Lumberjack World Championships are scheduled to take place on July 22-23-24, 2027.

== Women's events ==
=== Women's single buck ===
Competitors saw through a 16-inch-diameter (410 mm) white pine log for the fastest time. A starting cut arc is allowed in the competition. Timing begins when the signal "GO" is called and ends when the log is completely severed.

The 2026 Women's Single Buck Champions are (1) Martha King with a time of 14.75 seconds, (2) Kate Witkowski with a time fo 14.95 seconds, and (3) Andreanne La Salle with a time of 15.79 seconds. The world record, with a time of 11.43 seconds, was set in 2017 by Nancy Zalewski.

=== Women's underhand chop ===
Using a single bit pinned ax, competitors chop through a horizontal aspen log, 11 inches (280 mm) in diameter, and 15–28 inches (380–710 mm) long, for the fastest time.

The world record fell this summer as Karolina Urbanova of the Czech Republic smashed through to a 21.28 second victory for first place, followed by Stephanie Naud at 22.04 seconds, and Erin Lavoie at 22.94 seconds.

=== Women's standing block chop ===
Using a five-pound single-bit axe, competitors chop through a vertical standing aspen log 12 inches (300 mm) in diameter and 28 inches (710 mm) long in separate jack and jill heats. Timing begins on the "go" signal and ends when the log is severed.

In the women's finals, Karolina Urbanova again broke the world record with her time of 19.38 seconds, with Brittany Maclean at 21.34 seconds, and Hanna Quigley at 24.30 seconds.

=== Women's log rolling (birling) ===
Opponents step onto a floating log, cuff it to start the roll, spin it rapidly in the water with their feet, stop or snub it suddenly by digging into the log with special caulked birling shoes and a reverse motion to maneuver their adversaries off balance and into the water, a feat called 'wetting'. Dislodging an opponent constitutes a fall. The cardinal rule of logrolling is 'never take your eyes off your opponent's feet'. The referee starts each match. Competing birlers step off a dock onto a floating log, grasping pike poles held by attendants for balance. As they push off from the dock, the referee instructs the birlers to steady the log. When he is certain both birlers have equal control, he says, 'Throw your poles'. The match is on and continues to a fall or to expiration of the time limit set for each log. When the time limit is reached, the same match continues onto the next smaller log. In all rounds, the contest is decided by the best three out of five falls. Women start on 14-inch (360 mm) logs.

Livi Papadopoulis claimed her 7th Women's Logrolling title in 2026. Aini Anderson placed second, with Meredith Ingbretson coming in third.

=== Women's boom run ===
Starting on the log-rolling dock, two competitors run head to head on adjacent booms. Each competitor must step off the logrolling dock, running across a chain of logrolling logs to the chopping dock, circling a specified competition station and cross the pond on the boom logs back to the logrolling dock. The competitor must step onto the logrolling dock and touch the starting point. This is a timed event and is timed to the tenths of a second. Anyone leaving before the word "go" will be assessed a 10-second penalty.

Meredith Ingbretson captured the top spot, and a new world record in the Women's Boom Run, with a time of 13.78 seconds, followed by Alivia Poppe at 13.88 seconds.

=== Jill and Jill ===
A bucking contest where teams of two women compete against one another for the best time in cutting through a 20-inch (510 mm) white pine log. Starting cuts of no more than 1/2-inch (13 mm) deep, in order to set the teeth of the saw, are allowed. Timing starts on the signal "go" and ends when the block is severed. Logs must be cut completely through.

The King/Kerrigan combo proved to be the winning ticket for the Jill and Jill contest this summer with a time of 12.43. Second place went to the duo of Naud/La Salle with a respectable 12.86. The world record for the Jill and Jill competition was set in 2017 by Sephanie Naud and Janet Walker with a time of 9:81 seconds.

== Men's events ==
=== Axe throw ===
Competitors stand 20 feet away and throw a large, heavy double-bit axe—featuring a blade on each side—at a wooden target to hit the central bullseye.

First place was awarded to Ben Marshall from New Hampshire, second place to Nate Hodges of North Fork, California, and third to Mike Sullivan of Goshen, Connecticut.

=== Men's underhand chop ===
Using a five-pound single-bit axe, competitors chop through a horizontal aspen log 12 inches (300 mm) in diameter and 28 inches (710 mm) long. Timing begins on the signal "go" and ends when the log is severed.

Brayden Meyer captured first place with a time of 18.09 seconds in front of a full crowd, Matt Cogar came in second place with 20.25 seconds, and Matt Slingerland placed third at 25.67 seconds. The world record was set in 2006 by Jason Wynyard with a time of 15.94.

The Master's Underhand (for those over the age of 50) first place was awarded to Mike Sullivan with a time of 49.03 secoonds, second place to Charles Van Hall with 49.66 seconds, and Warrick Hallett came third with a time of 50.36 seconds.

=== Men's standing block chop ===
Using a five-pound single-bit axe, competitors chop through a vertical standing aspen log 12 inches (300 mm) in diameter and 28 inches (710 mm) long in separate jack and jill heats. Timing begins on the "go" signal and ends when the log is severed.

Brayden Meyer again showed skill with his win in the men's event, logging a time of 20.00 seconds flat. Matt Cogar placed second with a time of 20.98, and Jason Lentz came in third with 24.17 seconds. The world record for the standing block chop is 12.33 seconds set by Jason Wynyard from New Zealand in 2007.

=== Springboard chop ===
This event combines the skills of the chopper and the high climber. Out in the forest this technique enables a working lumberjack to reach softer wood above the tough and knotty base of a tree marked for cutting. Contestants climb a height of nine feet using two springboard placements and chop through a 12-inch-diameter (300 mm) aspen log mounted on the top of the spar pole.

First place was awarded to Brayden Meyer with a time of 55.91 seconds, second place to Matt Slingerland at 1:04.15, and third place to Tristan Vanbeek at 1:04.98. Dave Bolstad set a world record of 41.15 in 2003 besting his previous world record time of 41.63 in 2001.

=== Men's single buck ===
A single sawyer uses a one-man bucking saw to cut through a 20-inch-diameter (510 mm) white pine log for the best time.

Brayden Meyer won the Men's Single Buck with a time of 13.24 seconds, Mark Boquin edged into second at 13.99, and Cassidy Scheer came third at 14.77 seconds. Dion Lane set a new world record in 2006 with a time of 10.78 seconds.

=== Men's double buck ===
Two sawyers working as a team use a two-man bucking saw to cut through a 20-inch-diameter (510 mm) white pine log. Double buck team consists of two men. A starting cut arc is allowed. Timing begins for both competitions when the signal to "go" is called, and ends when the log is completely severed.

The Double Buck champions for 2026 were the team of Lentz/Boquin at 6.49 seconds. In second place was the team of Cogar/Slingerland at 6.72 seconds, and third went to Vanbeek/Kittle with 7.02 seconds. Jason Wynyard and Dion Lane hold the world record with a time of 4.77 seconds set in 2005.

=== Hot saw ===
A single sawyer using a single-cylinder, single-motor power saw makes three vertical cuts—down, up and down—through a 20-inch-diameter (510 mm) white pine log. This one-man contest is strictly against time. Chain saws may be warmed up prior to the contest, but must be turned off before the contest begins. Neither self-starting nor impulse-type push button starters nor twin motors are allowed. A starter gives the countdown and on the signal "go", competitors start their saws and make the three cuts. The contest ends when the third slice is severed. All cuts must be complete.

Nate Hodges took home first place with a time of 5.33 seconds, Jason Lentz placed second at 6.20 seconds, and Brayden Meyer came in third at 6.27 seconds. Nate Hodges holds the world record with a time of 4.28 seconds set in 2025.

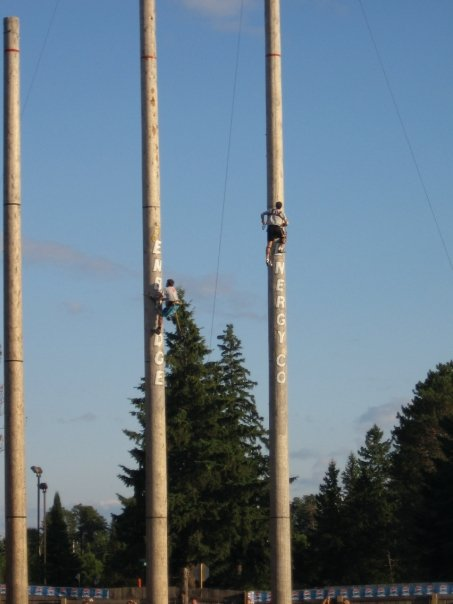
Speed climbing

=== 60-foot speed climb ===
Competitor scales a 60-foot-tall (18 m) cedar spar pole and returns to the ground. Contestants perform on twin spar poles and they must climb within 240 degrees of the sparring pole, as marked. Event is strictly against time and begins when the signal "go" is given and ends when the contestant touches the ground after climbing to the 60-foot mark. At the starting signal, contestants must have one foot on the ground and the other foot below the orange line as marked on the sparring pole. The contestant must touch the pole every 15 feet on the descent. The two climbers use spurred climbers and steel-core climbing ropes to scale the spar poles. Only traditional spurs are allowed.

Caleb Graves climbed the 60 feet in 13.56 seconds to take first, Dakota Robarge came in seconds at 14.43 seconds, and Deven Blair placed third at 14.73. Brian Bartow of Grants Pass, Oregon holds the world record of 12.28 seconds, set in 2012.

=== 90-foot speed climb ===
Contestant scales a 90-foot-tall (27 m) cedar spar pole and returns to the ground against time. Contestants compete on twin spar poles. Contestant must climb within the front 240 degrees of the sparring pole, as marked. Timing begins on the signal "go" and ends when the contestant touches the ground after ringing one of the two bells on top of the spar pole. At the starting signal, contestants must have one foot on the ground and the other foot below the orange line as marked on the sparring pole. On the descent climbers are required to touch inside each section. Contestants use spurred climbers and steel-core climbing ropes to scale the spar poles.

Caleb Graves again placed first in this 90 foot climb with a time of 21.48 seconds, with Chet Isaacson second, and Cameron Pilgreen third. In the 90 foot climb, Stirling Hart of Vancouver, Canada holds the world record with a time of 18.30, set in 2013.

=== Men's logrolling (birling) ===
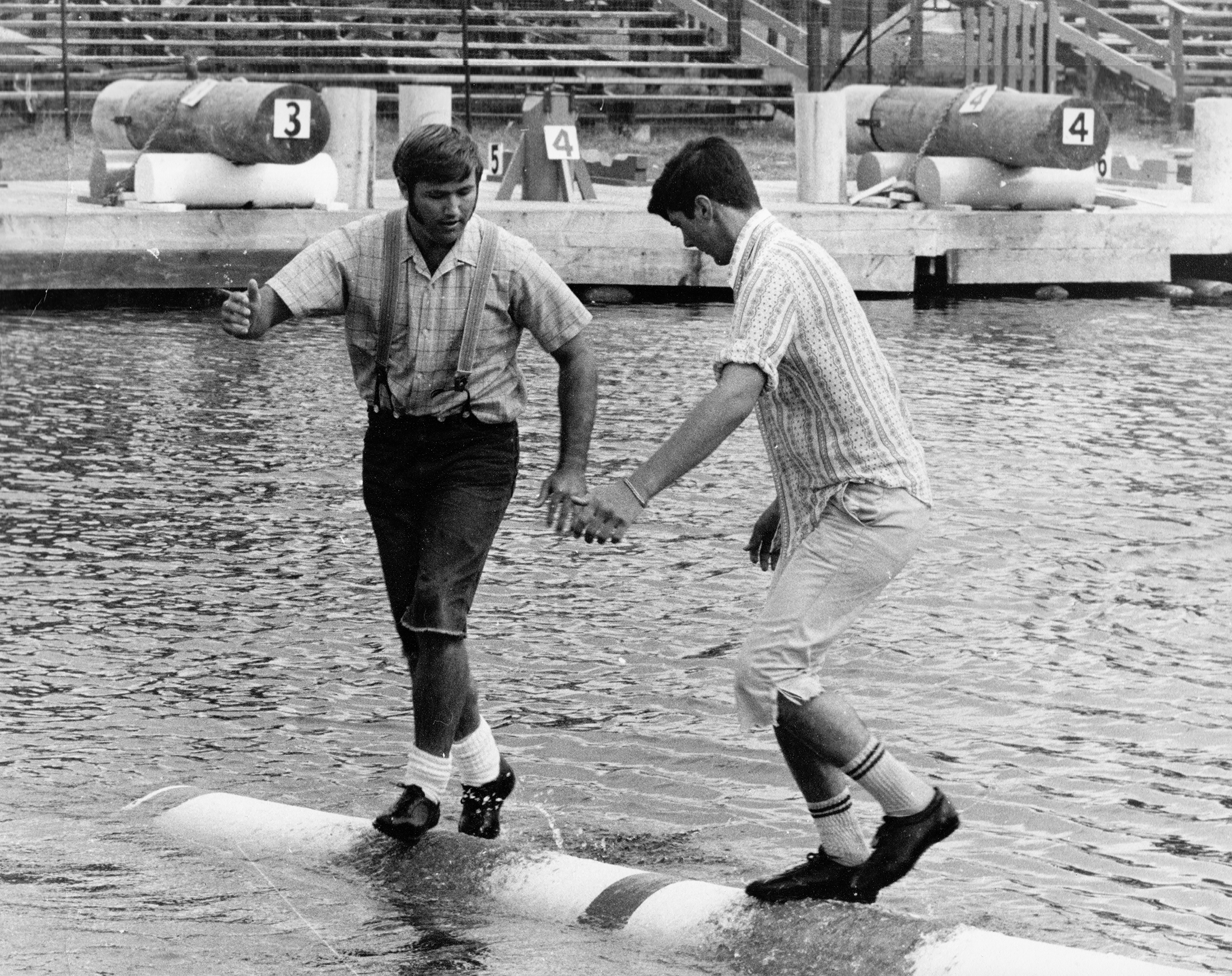
Logrolling (Birling) Competition

In competition, opponents step onto a floating log, cuff it to start the roll, spin it rapidly in the water with their feet, stop or snub it suddenly by digging into the log with special caulked birling shoes and a reverse motion to maneuver their adversaries off balance and into the water, a feat called 'wetting'. Dislodging an opponent constitutes a fall. The cardinal rule of logrolling is 'never take your eyes off your opponent's feet'. The referee starts each match. Competing birlers step off a dock onto a floating log, grasping pike poles held by attendants for balance. As they push off from the dock, the referee instructs the birlers to steady the log. When he is certain both birlers have equal control, he says, 'Throw your poles'. The match is on and continues to a fall or to expiration of the time limit set for each log. When the time limit is reached, the same match continues onto the next smaller log. In the semi-finals and the finals, the contest is decided by the best three out of five falls. Men start on 15-inch (380 mm) logs.

For the men, Marcus Heinick placed in the top spot for 2026, with Anthony Polentini second, and Tanner Hallett third. Both Jubiel Wickheim of Sooke, British Columbia (1969) and JR Salzman of Wisconsin (2015) have each held the title 10 times.

=== Men's boom run ===
Starting on the log-rolling dock, two competitors run head to head on adjacent booms. Each competitor must step off the logrolling dock, running across a chain of logrolling logs to the chopping dock, circling a specified competition station and cross the pond on the boom logs back to the logrolling dock. The competitor must step onto the logrolling dock and touch the starting point. This is a timed event and is timed to the tenths of a second. Anyone leaving before the word "go" will be assessed a 10-second penalty.

Deven Blair excited the audience with his 12.39 first place finish in 2026, followed by Caleb Graves at 12.82 seconds, and Hunter Lyons at 12.89 seconds. Will Hoeschler set a record of 12:26 in 2011.

== Team events ==
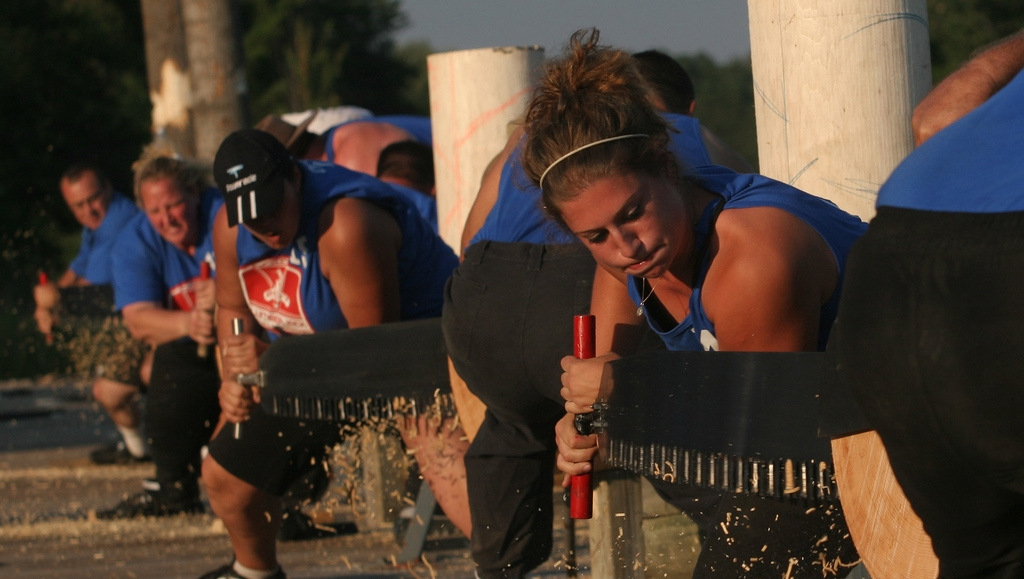
Jack and Jill competition

=== Jack and Jill ===
A bucking contests where a man and woman compete for the best time to cut through a 20-inch (510 mm) white pine log. Starting cuts of no more than 1/2-inch (13 mm) deep, in order to set the teeth of the saw, are allowed. Timing starts on the signal "go" and ends when the block is severed. Logs must be cut completely through.

Team Mercier/Naud placed first with a time of 7.65 seconds, Team Bouquin/King came in next at 8.51 seconds, and Slingerland/Slingerland placed third at 10.43 seconds. The world record for the Jack and Jill event was set in 2010 by Dave Jewett and Lindsay Daun with a time of 6.00 seconds.

=== Team relay ===
In this timed event there are two teams competing. Each team consist of a 60-foot climber, 2 boom runners (1 male, 1 female), a hot sawyer, a women's single buck sawyer and a standing block chopper. First a climber must climb and descend the 60-foot pole, when their feet touch the pad it is the signal for the male boom runner stationed on the chopping dock to run the logs to the logrolling dock; when he touches the dock it is then the female boom runner's turn to run the logs over to the chopping dock, once touching there the hot saws then cut through a 20-inch (510 mm) log and when the log drops the women commence the single buck, with the standing block chop the anchor event in this relay. Whichever team finishes first with the best time is the winner of the event. This event is the combination of the best of all the lumberjack skills: power, strength and sheer determination.

Team Lentz came out on top in the 2026 Championships with a time of 1:22.42, followed by Team Graves with a very close 1:22.79.

== Awards ==
=== Tony Wise All-Around Champions ===
The Tony Wise All-Around Champions, named after the founder of the Lumberjack World Championships, is awarded each year to the lumberjack and lumberjill who scores the most points. The key to the All-Around title is endurance and the ability to compete in as many events as possible. The top contestants in every event receive points each day of competition, making it important to make it through early qualifying rounds in as many events as possible. Points are given each day for the top six places in each event, with a first place being awarded 6 points, second 5 points and so on. There are two exceptions to this. Due to the nature of the springboard chop and logrolling, the all-around points for these two events will be scored differently. For the springboard, the sixth fastest competitors from Friday's and Saturday's heats receive double the points. This is because springboard competitors only get one opportunity to earn all-around points. 5th and 6th placements are awarded triple points for their final placement. This is because the final standings are the only opportunity for logrollers to earn points.

The 2026 Men's All-Around Lumberjack was awarded to Australian Brayden Meyer, with Jason Lentz of West Virginia second, and Matt Slingerland of North Carolina following close behind.

The 2026 Women's All-Around Lumberjill was awarded to Stephanie Naud of Canada, with Martha King of Chadds Ford, Pennsylvania coming in second, and Wisconsin's own Meredith Ingbretson placing third.

== See also ==
- Stihl Timbersports Series
- Wood chopping
- Woodsman
