= Southern Forestry Conclave =

The Southern Forestry Conclave is an annual competition among students from 15 southern forestry schools in a variety of physical and technical events. It typically involves more than 250 contestants. Traditional physical events include archery, axe throwing, pole climbing, log rolling, bow sawing, log birling, and cross-cut saw competition. Technical events include dendrology, timber volume estimation, photogrammetry, wood identification, and others. Scores from individual events are combined to determine the overall winning school of each year's conclave, which is a highly sought honor. The Forestry Conclave is hosted by the participating schools on a rotating basis and is sponsored by the Association of Southern Forestry Clubs.

The Conclave promotes spirited competition among the forestry students representing their respective schools and clubs, and participation in the Conclave helps students develop high standards and professionalism. Planning the Conclave requires considerable cooperation among the participating forestry clubs for it to be successful.

== History ==
Eight forestry schools participated in the first Conclave in 1958, which was sponsored by the University of Georgia. Fewer than 100 students competed in the first Conclave's mainly physical events. Over 50 Conclaves have been conducted since the first one.

== Host schools ==
- 1958 University of Georgia
- 1959 Louisiana State University
- 1960 Auburn University
- 1961 University of Florida
- 1962 University of Arkansas at Monticello
- 1963 Clemson University
- 1964 Oklahoma State University
- 1965 North Carolina State University
- 1966 Stephen F. Austin State University
- 1967 University of Georgia
- 1968 Clemson University
- 1969 Auburn University
- 1970 Virginia Tech
- 1971 University of Arkansas at Monticello
- 1972 Oklahoma State University
- 1973 University of Florida
- 1974 North Carolina State University
- 1975 Mississippi State University
- 1976 University of Georgia
- 1977 Stephen F. Austin State University
- 1978 Clemson University
- 1979 University of Arkansas at Monticello
- 1980 Virginia Tech
- 1981 University of Tennessee at Knoxville
- 1982 Oklahoma State University
- 1983 University of Florida
- 1984 Louisiana State University
- 1985 University of Georgia
- 1986 Texas A&M University
- 1987 North Carolina State University
- 1988 Auburn University
- 1989 Clemson University
- 1990 Mississippi State University
- 1991 Virginia Tech
- 1992 Louisiana Tech University
- 1993 University of Tennessee at Knoxville
- 1994 Stephen F. Austin State University
- 1995 University of Florida
- 1996 University of Arkansas at Monticello
- 1997 University of Georgia
- 1998 Virginia Tech
- 1999 North Carolina State University
- 2000 Louisiana State University
- 2001 Auburn University
- 2002 Texas A&M University
- 2003 Clemson University
- 2004 Mississippi State University
- 2005 Stephen F. Austin University
- 2006 Louisiana Tech University
- 2007 University of Tennessee at Knoxville
- 2008 University of Florida
- 2009 Alabama A&M University
- 2010 University of Arkansas at Monticello
- 2011 University of Georgia
- 2012 North Carolina State University
- 2013 Auburn University
- 2014 Virginia Tech
- 2015 Mississippi State University
- 2016 Clemson University
- 2017 Stephen F. Austin University
- 2018 Abraham Baldwin Agricultural College
- 2019 Louisiana State University
- 2020 Postponed due to pandemic
- 2021 Postponed due to pandemic
- 2022 University of Tennessee
- 2023 Louisiana Tech University
- 2024 University of Florida
- 2025 Alabama A&M University
- 2026 University of Arkansas at Monticello
- 2027 University of Georgia
- 2028 North Carolina State University
- 2029 Auburn University
- 2030 Virginia Tech
- 2031 Mississippi State University
- 2032 Clemson University
- 2033 Stephen F. Austin State University
- 2034 Abraham Baldwin Agricultural College
- 2035 Louisiana State University
- 2036 University of Tennessee
- 2037 Louisiana Tech University
