= Ketchikan Creek =

Coordinates: 55.3408°N 131.6397°W

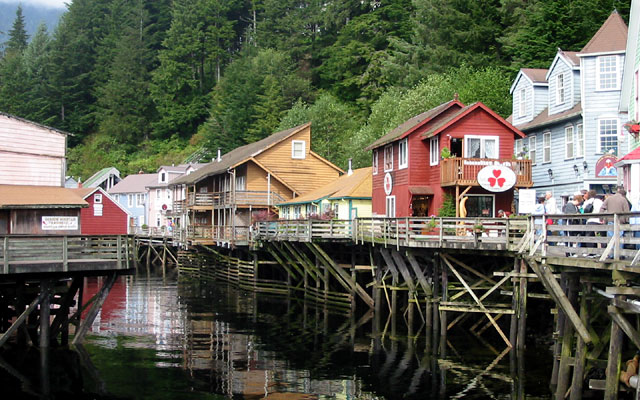
Ketichikan Creek and Creek Street

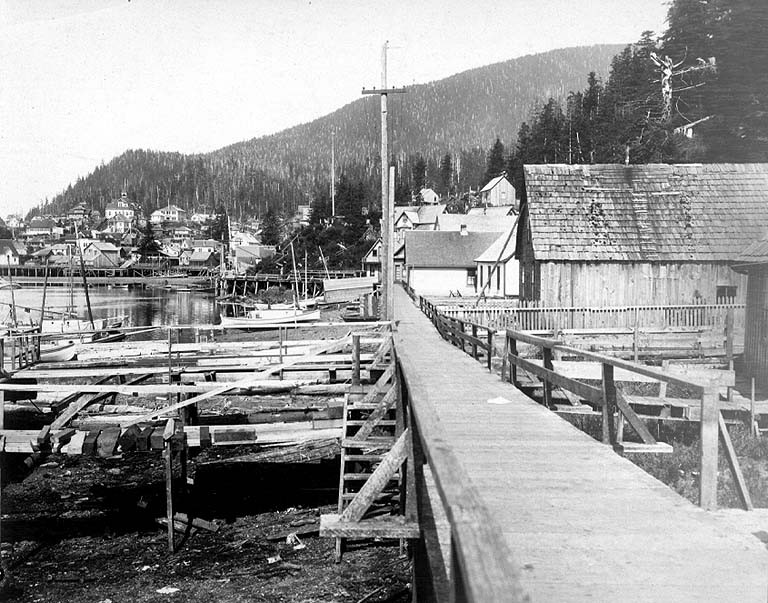
View of Ketchikan from Ketchikan Creek, September 1918

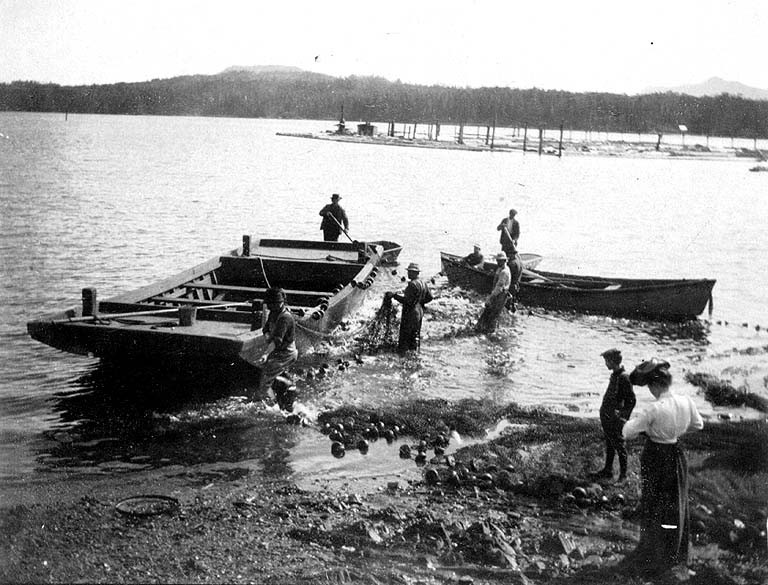
Seine fishing on Ketchikan Creek, early 20th century photo by John Nathan Cobb

Ketchikan Creek (alternate, "Fish Creek"; Tlingit, "Kitschkhin") is a salmon spawning stream on Revillagigedo Island in the U.S. state of Alaska. It heads in a lake and travels through downtown Ketchikan 6 miles (9.7 km) to Tongass Narrows. The historic Creek Street in Ketchikan runs along the creek banks as a piling-perched boardwalk.
