= Woodsman =

Sport based on various skills traditionally part of forestry

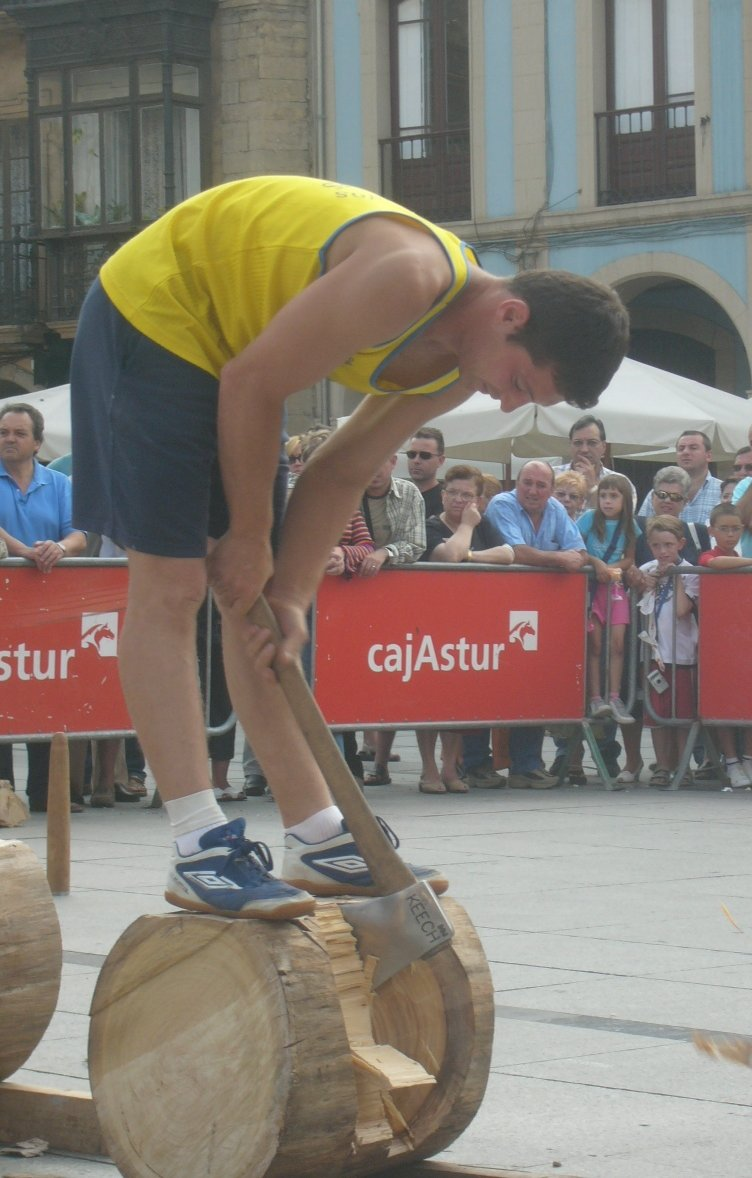
Wood chopping competition at Avilés, Spain, 2005

Woodsman (pl. woodsmen) is the title of a competitor in timber sports. Woodsmen participate in various events that replicate real skills used by lumberjacks while cutting down trees and preparing the wood. Woodsman competitions are a competitive, co-ed intercollegiate sport in the United States, Canada and elsewhere based on various skills traditionally part of forestry educational and technical training programs. In these competitions participants use various tools, such as racing axes, throwing axes, cross-cut saws, and chainsaws. In North America, the sport currently is organized in five regional divisions: northeastern, mid-Atlantic, southern, midwestern, and western.

== History ==
Woodsmen or lumberjack competitions have their roots in competitions that took place in logging camps among loggers. As loggers were paid for piece work, the ability to perform a specific task more quickly, or with a degree of showmanship, was something to be admired. Today the tradition survives on college campuses across Canada and the United States, as well as on various competitive circuits worldwide, including ESPN's now-defunct Great Outdoor Games. The sport is most popular in areas of the world with a strong logging tradition.

=== Active schools in Canada ===
The following is a partial list of colleges in Canada with active teams:

- Maritime College of Forest Technology — formerly known as the Maritime Forest Ranger School
- McGill University
- Nova Scotia Agricultural College
- University of New Brunswick

=== Active schools in the United States ===
The following is a partial list of colleges in the US with active teams:

- Allegany College of Maryland
- California Polytechnic State University
- Central Oregon Community College
- Colby College
- Colorado State University
- Dartmouth College
- Finger Lakes Community College
- Flathead Valley Community College
- Haywood Community College
- Humboldt State University
- Maine Maritime Academy
- Modesto Junior College
- Montana State University
- Montgomery Community College
- Northern Arizona University
- Oregon State University
- Paul Smith's College
- Penn State Mont Alto
- Penn State University
- Pennsylvania College of Technology
- Shasta College
- SUNY Alfred State College
- SUNY College of Agriculture and Technology Cobleskill
- SUNY College of Environmental Science and Forestry
- SUNY Morrisville
- Unity Environmental University
- University of California, Berkeley
- University of Connecticut
- University of Idaho
- University of Maine
- University of Montana
- University of Nevada, Reno
- University of New Hampshire
- University of Tennessee
- University of Vermont
- West Virginia University
- Iowa State University

== Competitive structure ==
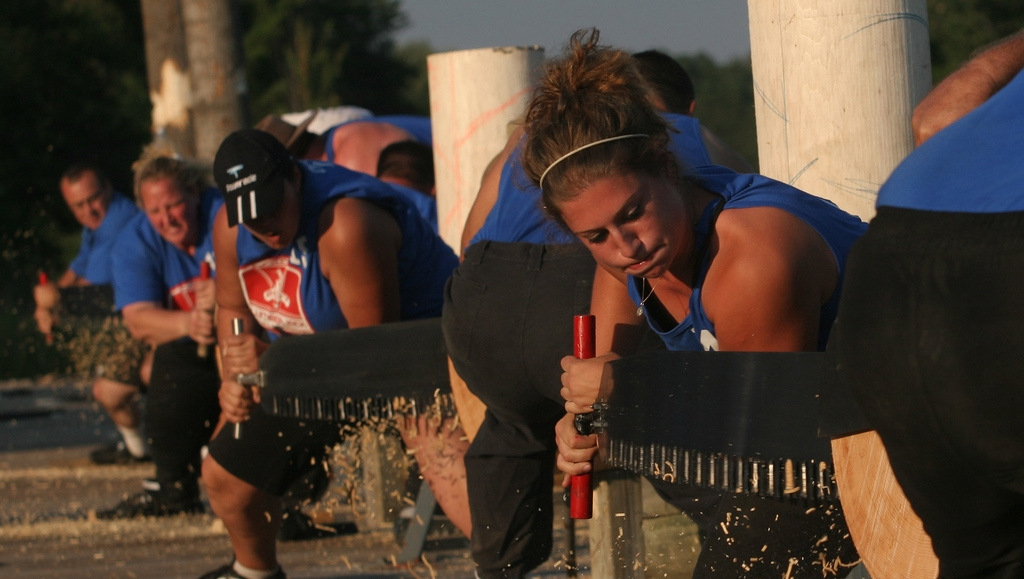
Jack and Jill competition, Lumberjack World Championships, Hayward, Wisconsin, 2007.

Unlike many college sports which have some degree of seasonality, members of collegiate woodsman teams compete throughout the academic year. Competitions typically take the form of a "meet", a series of events run throughout the day of competition. Meets may take place outdoors or inside a suitably large structure to safely accommodate the potentially dangerous tools used. An entry fee is charged to cover the cost of providing timber, awards, and food.

Schools compete in teams of six. A school has the option to send multiple teams, each of which pays an entry fee. Events are divided among team members at the discretion of the entering schools. There are, however, a series of team events in which every member is expected to participate fully. Men's and women's teams typically utilize the same equipment, however in competition some rules are adjusted by gender. If a school chooses to send a mixed-gender, or Jack and Jill team, men's rules apply. Each team is coordinated by a captain.

Events may be run as single, double, triple or team events at the discretion of the hosting school. The list and structure of the competition is typically published beforehand in order to allow team members to prepare for their assigned events.

=== Scoring ===
Most events are scored based on the time taken by the competitor to complete. Teams are scored as a whole, and each event is generally weighted equally. A point system for scoring may be used, where the first place competitor is awarded 100 points, and runners-up receive a percentage of the winner's score based on their performance in comparison. A second system calculates a winning team's place based solely on placement, and does not take into consideration the spread between each team's performance.

== Events ==
The following is a list of typical events run at collegiate woodsmen competitions:

=== Axe throw ===
This event requires a thrower to place a double-bit axe as close to the center of a target as possible from a set distance away. The axe is released in such a way that it rotates about the midpoint of the handle and, ideally, contacts the center of the target with only one edge. Scores are awarded from 1-3 or 1-5 points (depending on the target), with the highest score being a bulls-eye. Competitors are given three practice throws and three scored throws. A hit which crosses a line from one ring into the next is typically awarded the higher score. If an axe should contact the target with both edges, such that the handle sticks straight out, the handle is tapped downward until only one edge makes contact, which is used to calculate the score. If, during this process, the axe falls from the target, no points are awarded.

=== Splitting ===
Splitting can take several forms, but is typically performed with one or more bolts of hardwood and as a single, double or triples event. Splitting axes in the 4-6 pound range are used, and mauls are typically prohibited as they provide a sizable competitive advantage. Logs are always placed on the ground, and occasionally within a car tire to prevent a clumsy competitor from accidentally striking their own feet or legs with the axe. Points are awarded for the time to complete the event, and penalties are assessed for incomplete splits, where fibers still connect pieces of split wood together.

- The "dot split" version of the event involves a two-inch dot placed at the top of each bolt, normally at the natural, rather than the geometric, center of the log. The competitor is required to split the log into four full-length pieces, each having some amount of paint present on the end.
- The barrel split event requires a bolt to be split into numerous pieces and inserted into an opening in the top of a barrel, which is usually 6–8 inches wide. The event ends when all pieces have been completely inserted.

=== Wood chopping ===
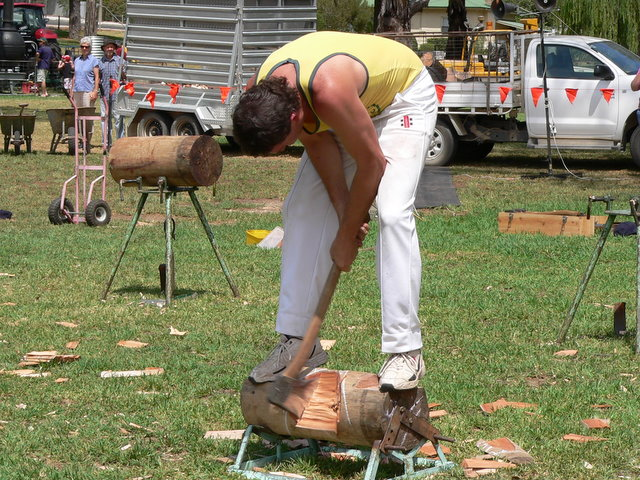
Woodchopping at the Angaston Show, Angaston, South Australia, 2007

==== Underhand chop ====
The underhand, or horizontal, chop is an axe event which involves cutting a bolt of wood set horizontally in a stanchion into two pieces. The event is scored for time. During the event, the competitor stands on top of a log set horizontally in a stanchion. The competitor swings the axe between their feet at a 45 degree angle on two opposing faces, opening up a face that extends halfway through the diameter of the log. The competitor then switches sides and severs the log by opening a face on the opposite side, working only on the second side until the two meet.

==== Standing block chop ====
The mechanics of wood removal for the standing block, or vertical, chop are similar to those of the underhand; however, because the log is set vertically, the technique involved is different from the underhand chop. A competitor must angle their axe swings to open a face at 45 degrees skyward and at 45 degrees below the horizontal in order to create the same two faces that are needed to chop one side of the log.

==== Hard hit chopping ====
This event is a variation on the underhand chop which scores a competitor not on time, but on the number of axe swings needed to sever the log. The least amount of swings used to cut through the log determines the winner. If two contestants tie, then time is taken into consideration, and whomever completed the log faster wins.

=== Sawing ===
==== Bow saw ====
Bow saw is most typically run as a singles or as a team event. A 36-inch bow saw fitted with a competition-grade peg and raker blade is most frequently used. In a singles event, a competitor is typically asked to cut a series of thin slices, called cookies, from a log, which is chained down to a stanchion. Each disk of wood sawn must be complete, or a penalty is assessed. As a team event, each member cuts one or two disks, and team members switch after completing their cuts. This event is scored for total time to complete all cuts.

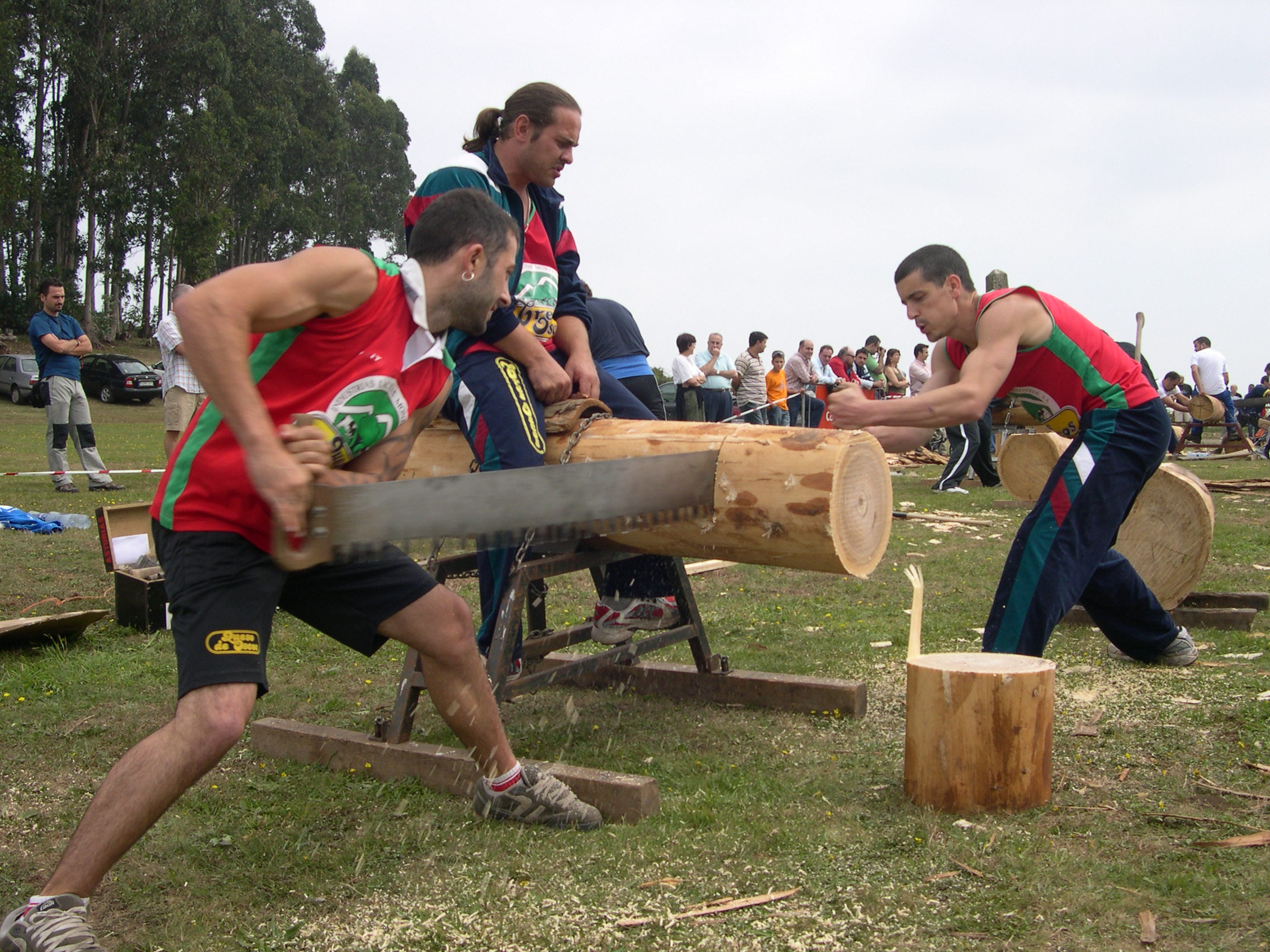
Crosscut sawing, Asturias, Spain, 2007

==== Crosscut sawing ====
This event is run as either a doubles or team event. As a crosscut saw is a two-man saw, each cut must be made with a pair of teammates. A series of cookies are sawed off for time, as in the bow saw event. The saws used for these events tend to be the most expensive individual pieces of equipment for a woodsman team, running into thousands of dollars for a competition-filed peg and raker or M-tooth saw. Great pains are taken before the event is run to examine the log being cut for knots or imperfections which can damage these very expensive and delicate instruments.

==== Jack and Jill ====
Jack and Jill is a double crosscut saw event that has one male and one female participant, following the same rules as the two-man saw. The name originates from the male term lumberjack and the female term lumberjill.

==== Single buck ====
The single buck event utilizes a two-man crosscut saw operated by one individual, and is almost universally run as a singles event. The saw is typically of the same grade as the crosscut saw used in the two man event, but may be custom filed for one person operation. The competitor is required to make a single cut or cookie through one large log. These logs are typically the largest diameter wood present at the competition. A competitor is allowed a starting cut, usually measured to be no more than 6-8 inches, or the width of a United States one dollar bill. A teammate is allowed to straddle the log and place a wedge to ease the competitor's progress and prevent binding of the saw.

=== Chainsaw events ===
==== Stock saw ====
This event is scored for time. A competitor wearing appropriate safety gear makes a series of cuts in a log. The event can be designed in various ways to emphasize visual accuracy or the ability to run their chainsaw at the peak of its power band. In the interest of fairness, the same saw is typically used throughout the day to eliminate any variables between saws (which can be significant, even for the same model saw).

- The "Down Up" version of the event requires a cut downward (on a pulling chain, using the bottom of the bar) followed by an upward cut (on a pushing chain, using the top of the bar). This is by far the most common version of the event.
- The "Down Up Down" event adds an additional down cut to the above.
- The "Up Down" event typically involves a cut halfway up a log, which then requires that the competitor remove their saw from the log and complete the cut from the top of the log. This version of the event is timed with an accuracy component based on how closely the two half-cuts met. This version is rarely seen in current competitions.

==== Disk stack ====
The chainsaw disk stack event involves cutting a series of stacked disks from a log set vertically in a stanchion. A competitor is given a set area of wood to cut, and a time limit, usually two minutes. Holding the saw at eye level, the competitor saws off successive disks, leaving previous cuts stacked on top of the log. The event is scored based on the number of whole disks left on top of the log at the time the competitor announces they are done. Time is used as a secondary tie-breaker. Performed well, it is not unusual for a competitor to cut in excess of 20 disks. During the event, the competitor is not allowed to manipulate the disks in any fashion other than sawing off additional disks.

=== Obstacle pole ===
The obstacle pole event simulates a fallen tree. The pole is 25 feet long, one end in the dirt and the other raised 4-5 feet off the ground. The participants are timed, and whoever can run from the tip of the pole to the base, up the length of the pole as it ascends in elevation, and cut the end of the pole off with a chainsaw, without falling, is the winner. The chainsaw is only allowed to be running in the last five feet of the pole and is indicated by a line painted on the pole. Before beginning the climb, the runner must have one whole foot behind a marked line at the base of the pole.

=== Pulpwood toss ===
The pulpwood toss event is typically run as a team event, and requires all competitors to throw a set of four pieces of pulpwood between two pairs of stakes, typically set 15–20 feet apart. The event is typically timed until 48 qualifying pieces of pulpwood have been thrown. A piece of wood earns a point toward the 48 possible points if it breaks the plane between the two stakes after the competitor is done throwing. This means that pulpwood thrown too far, not far enough, or not between the stakes is not counted. Pieces which a competitor knocks into place with subsequent throws are counted.

=== Log rolling and decking ===
Log rolling or log decking (not to be confused with birling) are two events that involve the use of peaveys and a pair of competitors to maneuver a log to a set destination. In log decking, the competitors must push the log along a track of wooden beams and usually up to the top of a ramp. In log rolling, the competitors may either have a straight course or a course which requires a series of turns in order to maneuver a log to its finish line along the ground. This event is typically run as either a doubles or team event.

=== Choker race ===
A timed race where participants navigate an obstacle course carrying a metal wire choker cable. Participants start the race by unbuckling the choker. They then run through the customized obstacle course and finish by looping it around a large log, imitating strapping choker cables to logs in wood production for transport. The participants must wear gloves and a helmet, as the loose cable can weigh more than 40 pounds. There is no standardization for the orientation of the obstacle course and is left up to the venue. Courses must allow at least 12 feet wide of room for participants, and the course has limitations for difficulty and safety.

=== Birling ===
This event traditionally involves two competitors, each on one end of a free-floating log in a body of water. The athletes battle to stay on the log by sprinting, kicking the log, and using a variety of techniques as they attempt to cause the opponent to fall off. Due to a lack of a body of water nearby, some schools will use a swimming pool to house a log or build a "dry birling" station using a log on a spindle, allowing it to spin freely. Some schools will run this event in a tournament style, while others will time how long a competitor is able to stay on the log or count the number of revolutions completed within a time limit due to safety concerns.

=== Pole climbing ===
A harnessed and belayed climber must reach the top of a featureless pole as quickly as possible. The pole is typically the size of a standard telephone pole, and the climber wears homemade spikes in order to make rapid upward progress.

=== Fire build ===
The fire build event involves making a fire using a tool, a piece of dried wood, and strike anywhere matches. A can of soapy water is placed on top of the fire, and time is called for the event when the can boils over. The event may be run with one or two competitors and using one or two tools. When two tools are used, one tool is usually a hatchet or small axe, and the second tool is a knife. The event is scored for time.

== Culture ==
The culture on teams which participate in woodsmen competitions varies widely from that of a drinking club with chainsaws to a school sanctioned varsity sport with all the associated visibility and expectations thereof. The sport has been co-educational for all of recent memory, and female competitors are for the most part given equal treatment to men, though the professional circuit has largely chosen to ignore women. Fraternization among team members is frequent.

The atmosphere at a woodsmen meet oscillates between the seriousness of competition and the friendly environment of the county fair. Competitors practice specific events for weeks and months, gaining efficiency and power in every movement. The selection of equipment is not something to be taken lightly, given its considerable cost, and each piece of wood is scrutinized for imperfections and knots. The weight of pulp may need to be judged solely by sight, and insights into the quirks of a log roll log can be garnered from watching other competitors.

On the lighter side, these events are frequently attended by friends and family, who mingle freely with the woodsmen. Actual hostility between teams is rare and most competitors come to know each other by name. Booing is unheard of at woodsmen competitions: competitors cheer loudly for their own team members and for members of other teams. Those competitors that finish last are urged on until the event is completed. As competitors rarely have any experience in timber sports before entering college competition, novice competitors are actively recruited from students with no previous wood chopping experience.

== Equipment ==
In woodsmen competitions, the required equipment consists of cross-cut saws, bow saws, axes, peaveys, helmets, gloves, foot and leg protection, and climbing gear for the pole climb.

Common types of saws include the M-tooth and the peg and raker. Most beginners will start on an M-tooth because it is a more forgiving saw and move up to a peg and raker as they improve. Competition bow saws, unlike commercial bow saws, have frames and blades that are 42" long. Many different grinds and makes of competition axes are available, with some of the more popular types including Tuatara, Keech, and Brute Force.

For speed chop and hard hit events, heavier and sharper race axes are used. These axes have a broader face, with more edge to cut into the wood, and are often sharpened more than an average splitting axe. The origins and design of racing axes come from the single–bit felling ax, or American ax, a standard felling axe used in field work since the late 18th century.

== See also ==
- Lumberjack World Championship
- Southern Forestry Conclave, including woodsman-like competitions, as well as other events
- Stihl Timbersports Series
- Wood chopping
