= Pole climbing =

Climbing activity

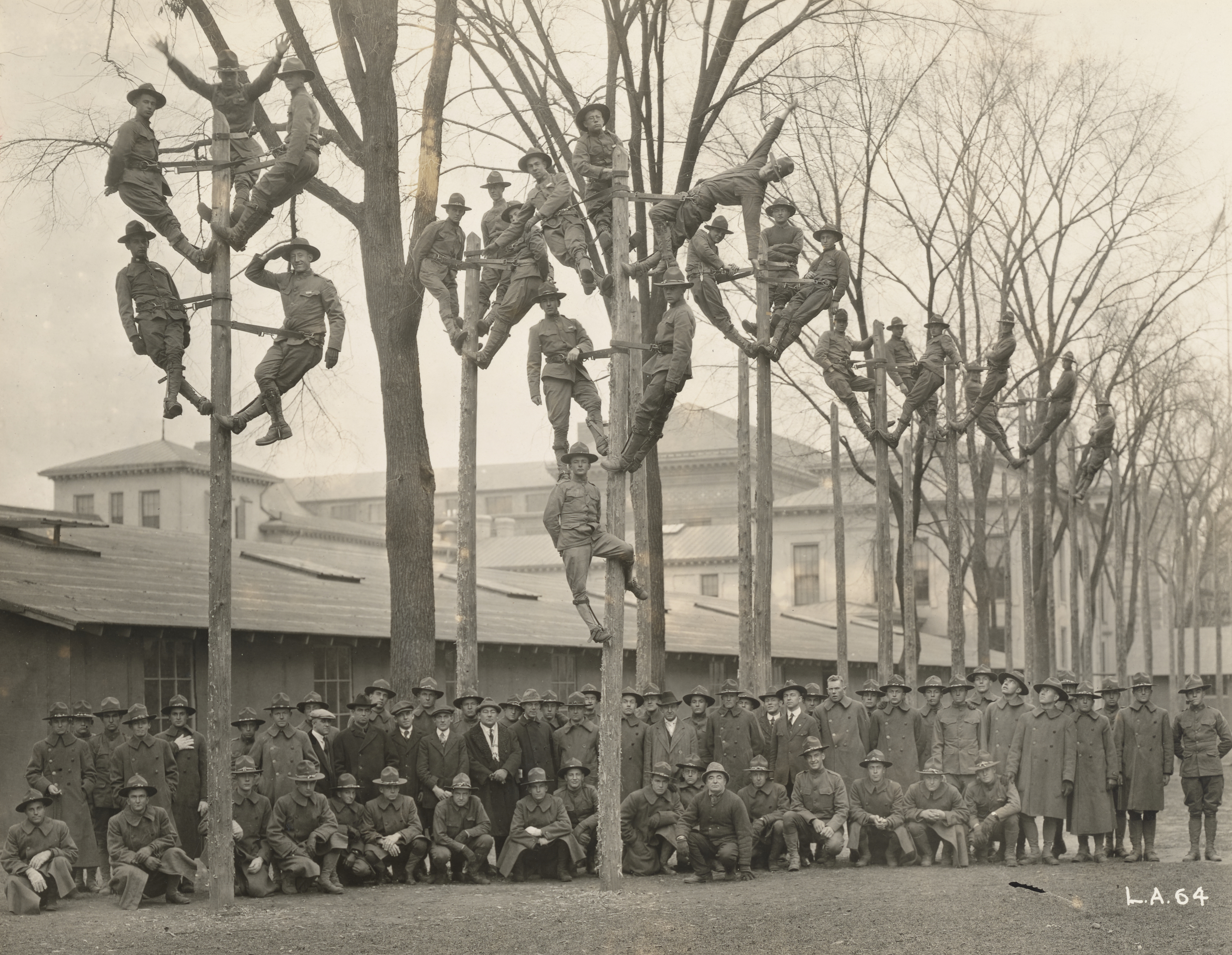
Pole-climbing class at the University of Michigan for ongoing lineworkers, January 1919

Pole climbing is ascending a pole which one can grip with their hands. The related activity of mast climbing describes ascending an object similar to a pole, but having a larger diameter which excludes gripping with the hands. In either case, it is normally assumed that climbers who view the activity as a gymnastic sport use only their bodies and limbs, without artificial aids.

== History ==
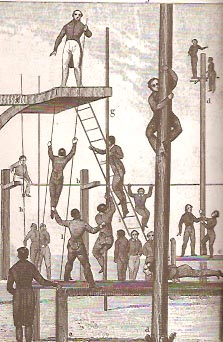
Pole and mast climbers from a pre-1851 engraving

Pole climbing

As sporting pursuits both pole and mast climbing may have begun as either martial exercises or physical training related to the invention and development of sailing ships, with the attendant requirements of scaling high masts.

Pole climbing appears in some historical documents describing various cultural practices. For example, Fray Diego Durán describes watching an Aztec climbing feat: ". . . to see an Indian standing on top of the 'flying pole' (for so they call it) anywhere between one hundred eighty and two hundred feet in height! He stands there with a trumpet in his hand, and, just watching him, those who observe become giddy . . . after having performed a thousand turns and tricks, he descends with an expression as serene as if he had done nothing!"

Johann Friedrich GutsMuths (1759–1839) wrote the following in the late 18th century, in one of the first textbooks of "modern" gymnastics : "The climbing of the mast is far more challenging [than pole climbing], for the surface is smooth and the hands cannot go around it. Here, it is most necessary to have performed well on elementary exercises [gripping with legs and thighs]. This activity is known, by the way, in several areas of Germany and Europe as an amusement for the general public. A few weeks ago one of my pupils climbed a tree trunk 50 feet (15 m) high. With nonchalance, he held on to the tree with one hand, tore off some leaves and flowers with the other, and fearlessly scattered them, looking down on his ascent. On such tree trunks one must not climb too high because of vertigo; if one loses his composure, he can slide down the tree, rather than fall."

Friedrich Ludwig Jahn (1778–1852) describes both pole and mast climbing in his seminal work of 1816 on gymnastic apparatus and exercises.

== See also ==
- Climbing
- Greasy pole
- Rope climbing
