= Woodchopper =

Woodchopper may refer to

== United States ==
- Woodchopper Note Large-size US five-dollar banknote
- Woodchopper Roadhouse historic establishment in Alaska, US
- Woodchoppertown, Pennsylvania an unincorporated community in Pennsylvania, US

== People ==
- Arkansas Woodchopper (1906–1981) an American country music musician
- David Bolstad (1969–2011), New Zealand representative woodchopper
- David Foster (woodchopper) (1957- ) an Australian world champion woodchopper
- Brad De Losa (1979- ) an Australian champion woodchopper
- Ned Shewry (1889–1962) New Zealand world champion woodchopper
- Paul Silva (woodchopper) (1897–1974) New Zealand soldier, timber worker, axeman and bridge builder
- Butler Te Koeti (1883–1964) New Zealand axeman
- Jason Wynard (1973–2023) New Zealand champion woodchopper

== Other ==
- Chilly And The Woodchopper Episode of Chilly Willy - a cartoon character, a diminutive penguin
- Woodchopping a sport
- Woodchopper's Ball a 1939 jazz composition by Joe Bishop and Woody Herman
- Twistin' at the Woodchopper's Ball Canada song {single) by Ronn Metcalfe
- Orne Woodchoppers a non-combat penal military unit of the Belgian Army during World War I
