= 2024 in lumberjack sports =

This topic lists the lumberjack sports events for the 2024 year.

== Tree climbing ==
=== Major International Competitions ===
Date	Place	Event	Winner	Second place	Third place
April 25-28	Malaysia	2024 Asia Pacific Tree Climbing Championship			
July 4-7	(Croatia) Jastrebarsko	2024 ISA European Tree Climbing Championship			

== Woodchopping ==
=== Major International Competitions ===
Date	Place	Event	Winner	Second place	Third place
May 4	(United States) Virginia Beach	2024 North American Trophy			
May 25	(Italy) Milan	2024 Rookie World Championship	(Australia) Matt Coffey	(Belgium) Kamiel Van Raemdonck	(New Zealand) Cleveland Cherry
May 25	(Italy) Milan	2024 World Trophy	(New Zealand) Jack Jordan	(Czech Republic) Matyáš Klíma	(United States) Matthew Cogar
September 29	(Switzerland) Bellinzona	2024 European Trophy			
November 8–9	(France) Toulouse	2024 TIMBERSPORTS World Championship			

=== Major National Competitions ===
Date	Place	Event	Winner	Second place	Third place
March 9	(New Zealand) Palmerston North	2024 New Zealand Pro Championship	(New Zealand) Jack Jordan	(New Zealand) Kyle Lemon	(New Zealand) Shane Jordan
March 16	(Australia) Cairns	2024 Australian Trophy	(Australia) Brad De Losa	(Australia) Laurence O'Toole	(Australia) Brayden Meyer
May 4	(Germany) Lenggries	2024 German Ford Ranger Cup			
June 29	(Austria) Innviertel	2024 Austrian Pro Championship			
July 28	(United States) Milwaukee	2024 U.S. Pro Championship			
August 17	(Canada) Kelowna	2024 Canadian Pro Championship			
