= Ferry Svan =

Swedish logging sportsman (born 1996)

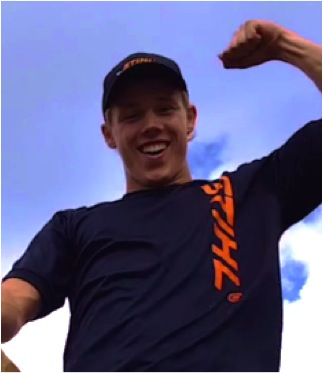

Personal information
- National team: Sweden
- Born: 2 October 1996 (age 29) Vansbro, Sweden
- Occupation: logging sportsman
- Years active: 2014-present
- Height: 178 cm (5 ft 10 in)
- Weight: 84 kg (185 lb)
- Other interests: hunting, cars
- Website: data.stihl-timbersports.com/Athlete/1492 www.axelent.co.uk/axel/an-axelent-athlete

Sport
- Country: Sweden
- Sport: loggersports
- Rank: Senior

Achievements and titles
- World finals: 1 gold
- Regional finals: 3 gold, 2 silver, 1 bronze
- Highest world ranking: 1 (Junior); 7 (Senior)

Ferry Svan (born 2 October 1996) is a Swedish professional woodchopper and logging sportsman, and the son of champion skier Gunde Svan. He is the first Swedish person to compete in a World Championship in logging sports, the first Swede to win a World Championship, and the youngest person to compete in logging sports as a Senior athlete. He has previously held four Swedish national records. He competes in the Stihl Timbersports Series. He participated as a celebrity dancer in Let's Dance 2025 broadcast on TV4.

== Logging sports ==
=== Junior career ===
Svan was introduced to woodchopping as a sport when he was in high school, attending a Skogsbruksskola, a special Swedish Forestry high school; he had also spent time working on his father's "farm" — tending to 1000 hectares of forest — before he began it as a sport. In 2014 he went to his first Nordic games for logging sports, where he took gold as a junior, repeating this feat in 2016. It was at this point that Svan took up logging full-time, returning to his parents' farm to train. He said that full-time training is hard, but pays off, and that doing it alone he spends more time preparing his timber than he does actually practising chopping. His aim for 2017 was to become a professional logging athlete; though the sport has about 500 "active athletes" regularly competing, only a few of these can actually make money from it. He explained his reason for moving home was mostly financial, but did add that his father has good experience in training regimens that would be helpful. He also expressed an interest in attending training camps around the world to learn from pros.

In 2017 he qualified for the World Junior Championship, which was held in Hamburg, Germany. He was the first Swede to do so, and won the competition after having taken the lead after only two events, also becoming the first Swede to win a World Championship. Before the competition, he had said he was hoping to place in the top 5. Later in 2017 he competed in the Italian junior championship, where he placed fourth.

=== Senior career ===
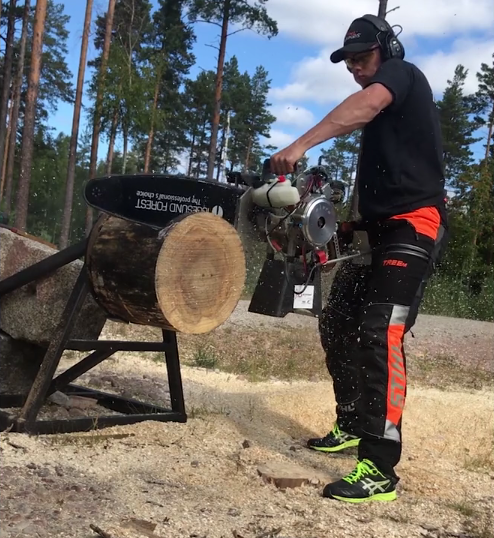
Svan practicing the hot saw in Vansbro in 2017

To introduce his senior career, Svan appeared on the show Bingolotto on 11 June 2017, where he performed multiple woodchopping events.

In summer 2017 he again competed in the Nordic championship, now as a senior, and placed second. He was the youngest person to ever compete in the sport as a senior. In October 2017, he competed in the European Champions Trophy Senior competition qualifiers, but also was able to take an automatic wild card spot because of his World Championship title.

At the start of April 2018, Svan gained sponsorship from Swedish machine guarding safety company Axelent AB, which he explained he has a lot in common with because of both their focuses on precision work and safety. With the sponsorship, because he still wasn't earning enough from wins to live off, he intended to move to New Zealand and train, because the sport is very popular there.

In early April 2018, Svan experienced an injury while training. He dropped an axe after chopping down trees to prepare for training and, to save it from falling down a hill, instinctively tried to catch it on his ankle, in what he calls a "stupid move". Initially it looked like a surface wound, but after being unable to move his foot he returned to hospital. He had severed a tendon and required surgery, which was his first operation, and had to be put in a plaster cast for 6 weeks. The Champions Trophy competition, held in Marseille, France, was in late May 2018, 6–7 weeks later. However, he still managed to compete. At this competition he also became the youngest person to compete as a senior in an international competition.

In the first round of the Champions Trophy, Svan competed against Andrea Rossi, who ended up disqualified. In the quarterfinals, he competed against Martin Komarek, who beat his time, with Svan ultimately placing eighth. In each stage of this competition, he broke his own personal best. He said that making it to the quarterfinals was beyond his expectations and he was proud of knocking 15 seconds off some of his personal records, calling himself a "giant" for the achievements; in the heat he lost, he attained what was a new Swedish national record.

Svan's performance at the 2019 Timbersports Champions Trophy competition, in Kungsbacka, saw him set a new personal best, but missing out on his target of a top-5 placement, losing to Michal Dubicki in the quarter finals.

=== Competitions ===
| Year | Competition | Level | Location | Position | Points | Time |
|---|---|---|---|---|---|---|
| 2014 | Nordic Championship | Junior | | 1st | | |
| 2016 | Nordic Championship | Junior | | 1st | | |
| 2017 | World Championship | Junior | Germany | 1st | 26 | 1:17.80 |
| 2017 | Italian Championship | Junior | Italy | 4th | 20 | 1:39.26 |
| 2017 | Nordic Championship | Senior | Sweden | 2nd | 58 | 3:19.97 |
| 2017 | European Champions Trophy Qualifying | Senior | Netherlands | 13th | | 4:55.39 |
| 2018 | Champions Trophy | Senior | France | 8th | | 1:20.18 |
| 2018 | Nordic Championship | Senior | Denmark | 4th | 48 | 5:50.52 |
| 2018 | Helsingborg Cup Champions Trophy Qualifying | Senior | Sweden | 2nd | | 2:42.17 |
| 2018 | Helsingborg Cup - Pro | Senior | Sweden | 5th | 51 | 5:41.54 |
| 2018 | European Trophy | Senior | Poland | 12th | | 1:26.12 |
| 2018 | Team World Championship | Senior | England | 8th (Sweden) | | 1:04.44 |
| 2019 | Champions Trophy | Senior | Sweden | 6th | | 1:12.94 |
| 2019 | Trollhättan Cup - Pro | Senior | Sweden | 2nd | 20 | 50.68 |
| 2019 | Trollhättan Cup - Nordic Trophy | Senior | Sweden | 3rd | | 1:22.95 (Note: Though Svan had the best time at every stage of the competition and the best time overall, a bad cut in the semi-final resulted in disqualification and let his opponent go on to the final, while he competed in the battle for 3rd) |
| 2019 | Nordic Championship | Senior | Norway | 1st | 74 | 2:34.05 |
| 2019 | World Championship | Senior | Czechia | 7th | 30 | 2:14.70 |

=== Statistics ===
As of December 2019, Svan's statistics are:

| Discipline | PB | Year | Competition | Comments |
|---|---|---|---|---|
| Hot Saw | 8.50 | 2017 | Nordic Championship | |
| Springboard | 1:04.85 | 2019 | World Championship | |
| Standing Block Chop (rookie) | 22.65 | 2017 | World Championship | previous national record |
| Standing Block Chop | 21.15 | 2019 | World Championship | |
| Single Buck (rookie) | 12.02 | 2017 | World Championship | previous national record |
| Single Buck | 15.61 | 2019 | Nordic Championship | |
| Single Buck w/o Tools | 18.31 | 2019 | World Championship | national record |
| Underhand Chop (rookie) | 31.81 | 2017 | World Championship | previous national record |
| Underhand Chop | 19.28 | 2019 | World Championship | national record |
| Stihl Stock Saw | 11.10 | 2018 | Helsingborg Cup - Pro | |
| Champions Trophy | 1:12.94 | 2019 | | has held a national record |
