= Stirling Hart =

Canadian professional lumberjack

Stirling Hart (born June 2, 1989, in Maple Ridge, British Columbia) is a Canadian professional lumberjack.

Hart is a record holder and a World record holder in tree climbing and Springboard chop. He was the 2018 winner of the STIHL Timbersport Champions trophy.

== Tree climbing ==
Hart claimed his first world record as a tree climber in 2010, racing up and down a 100' tree in 23.3 seconds. In 2013 his World record for the 90’ climb was 18.30 and his World record for the 80’ climb was 17.81 seconds.

== Racing axe ==
In 2014 Hart switched to racing axe competition. In his first STIHL Canadian Championship he finished second in Toronto, Ontario. It was followed with a silver medal win for team Canada in Innsbruck, Austria.

In 2017 Hart won his first World Record title as an axemen in the Springboard competition with a time of 35.67 seconds at the Stihl Timbersports Series World Championship in Stuttgart, Germany. Later that year in Hamburg, Germany, at the World's Champions Trophy where the athletes compete in a 4-event, back-to-back and head-to-head competition consisting of Stock Saw, Underhand Chop, Single Buck and Standing Block Chop, Hart lost to Brad De Losa by 0.48 seconds, receiving the silver medal.

In May 2018 Hart won the STIHL Timbersport Champions Trophy in Marseilles, France in a time of 1.03.
