= Hermann Schonbachler =

Ranger in Swiss

- Born: Hermann Schönbächler; July 14, 1966 (age 59); Biel/Bienne, Bern, Switzerland
- Occupation: Forester
- Known for: Five times world champion in Stihl Timbersports Series, television celebrity in Swiss TV

Hermann Schonbachler (born July 14, 1966) is a Swiss Canadian former sport wood feller, who was a five time world champion in the Stihl Timbersports Series (2005 to 2010), businessman and television celebrity. He gained national attention on Swiss TV in the series 'Up and away', which portrays Swiss emigrant families.

== Early life and education ==
Hermann Schonbachler was born and raised in Biel/Bienne, Switzerland. He has a brother. Schonbachler studied Forest management and became a diplomed forester in Switzerland. Until 2010, he operated his own woodworking company there, where he was also active in Christmas tree sales and other forestry related work.

== Career ==
Between 2005 and 2010, he was a five time world champion participating in the Stihl Timbersports Series. In 2013, he officially resigned from participating in those championships. In 2007 and 2008, he was European vice champion and 2006 and 2007 European champion with his Swiss team. At the world championship in Oberstdorf, Germany he was third best. In 2013, he officially resigned from practicing the sport, at the 11. world championships in Brienz, Switzerland.

In 2011, Schonbachler became a TV-celebrity and national treasure, by participating in the Swiss TV produced series 'Up and away', which focused on documenting Swiss emigrants abroad. He was hired to work in Forestry in British Columbia, initially on a work visa and later on permanent residence which eventually led to citizenship. 'Up and away' was awarded with the Swiss Television Prize in 2012. During these series, Schonbachler and his family became nationally known and awarded cult status by his humble means of life. An outburst of Schonbachler with his youngest son Richard "Richi" Schonbachler, became a hit on YouTube. In November 2012, the authors Beat Kuhn, W. Gassmann and Schonbachler's wife Christine, published the book "Ziemlich wild - die Geschichte der Familie Schönbächler" (en. Fairly wild - the history of the Schonbachler family". The first edition was sold out after two months and had to be reprinted. In 2013, the book was awarded first prize in the non-fiction category of the Swiss Book Trade's bestseller list.

== Personal life ==
Schonbachler is married to Christine and has three children.

They reside on 50 wooded acres in British Columbia. Schonbachler is a Swiss-Canadian dual citizen.
