= John H. Littlefield =

American artist and engraver

- Born: John Harrison Littlefield; 1825; Cicero, Illinois US
- Died: 1902 (aged 76–77)
- Known for: Painting
- Notable work: Abraham Lincoln portrait

John Harrison Littlefield (1835-1902) also known as J. H. littlefield was a painter. He is best known for having painted an image of Abraham Lincoln which was engraved and featured on the United States five-dollar bill.

== Biography ==
Littlefield was born in 1825 and his family were from Cicero, Illinois and they were friends with the future US president Abraham Lincoln. In 1887 Littlefield told the Brooklyn Eagle that he was a student in Abraham Lincoln's office for two years.

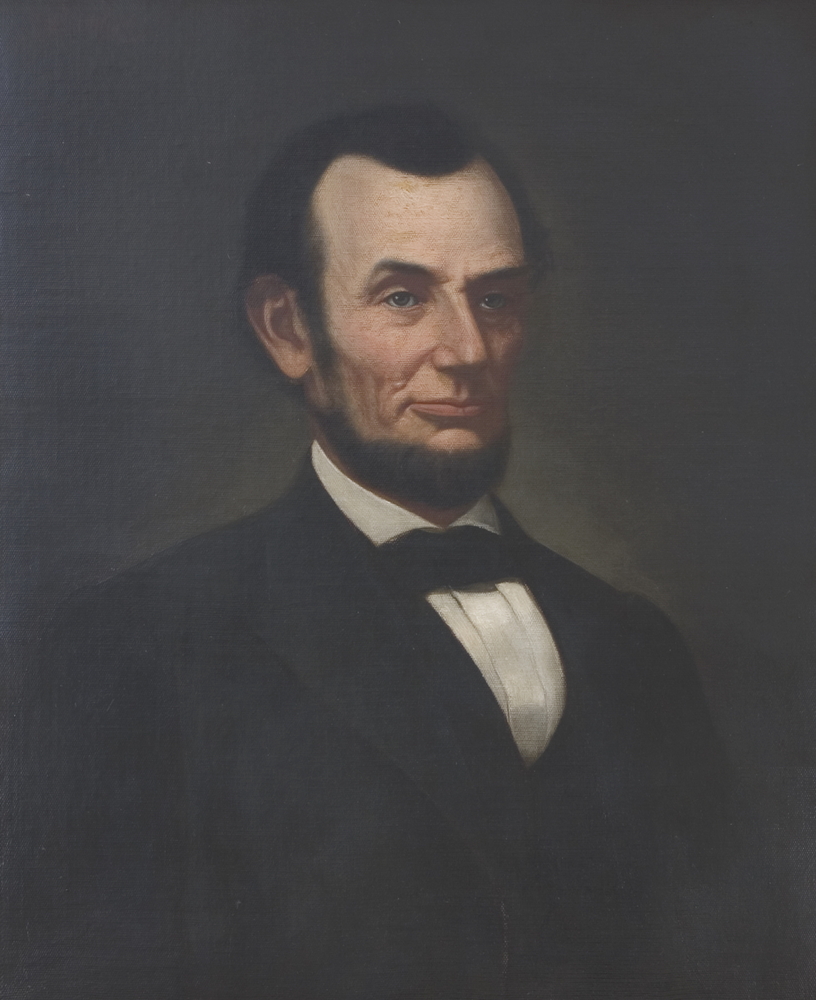
Abraham Lincoln portrait by John H. Littlefield (1865)

In 1869 Henry Gugler completed an engraving of Abraham Lincoln which was based on an 1865 painting by Littlefield. The Lincoln engraving took Gugler three years to complete. The engraved image was used on the United States five-dollar bill beginning with the Series of 1928; the bill featured the portrait of Lincoln. He was also responsible for painting the image of US president Ulysses S. Grant. He died in 1902.

== Gallery ==
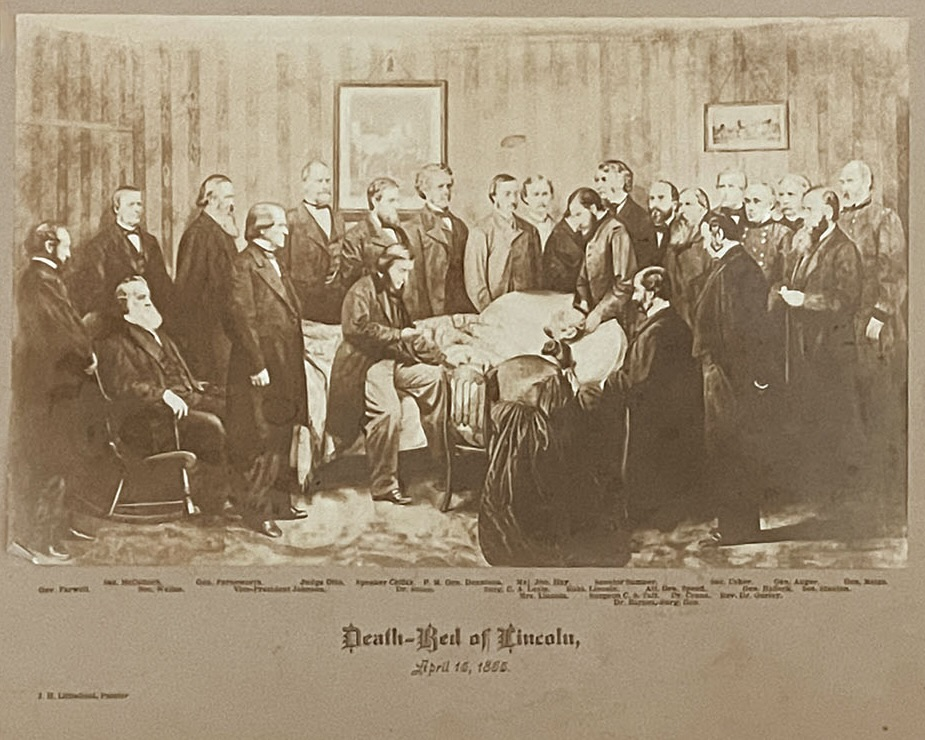
Death-Bed of Lincoln, Albumen Photograph of John Littlefield Painting

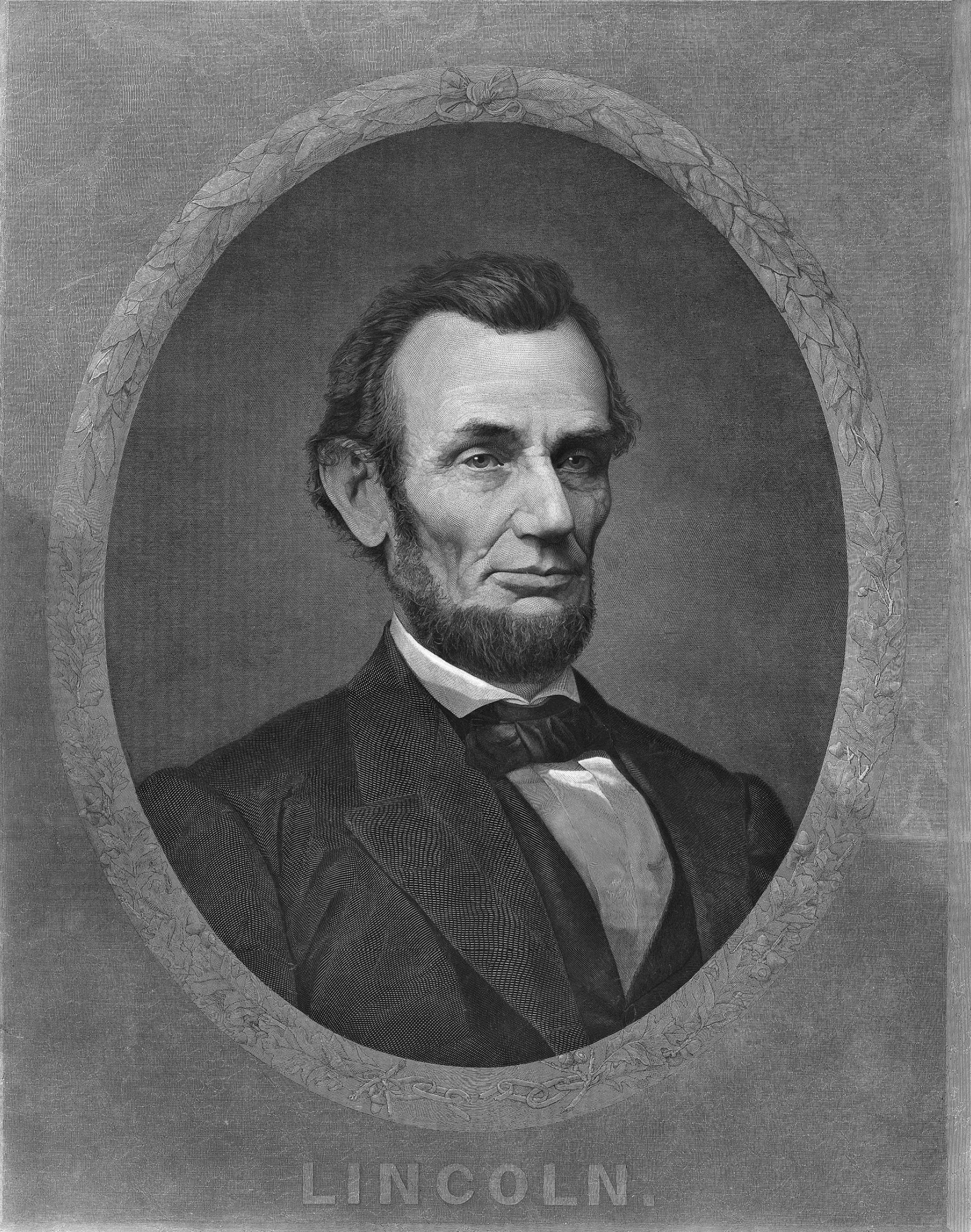
Engraving of Abraham Lincoln by Henry Gugler, based on Littlefield's painting
