= Hot Saw =

Wood-chopping competition

Hot Saw is an event or discipline in logging sports. It is also used to describe the type of saw used in the event, a high-powered chainsaw.

== Overview ==
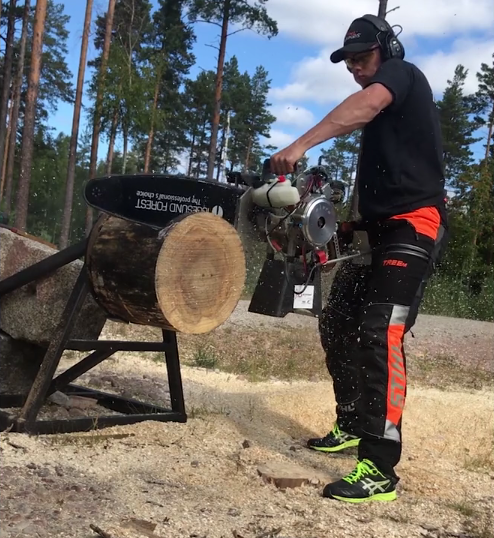
Junior World Champion Ferry Svan practicing in 2017

This event is often the crowd's favourite, and certainly the loudest. Compared to other logging sports using an axe or manual saw, this event uses a motor-powered chainsaw. However, to stick to the traditional ethos, the chainsaw must be either completely homemade or self-modified in some way, within certain restrictions; one required modification is for the competitor to add a super engine. The chainsaws are large and methanol-run. The saws used by top competitors are typically snowmobile or watercraft engines cut in half, and are far heavier than regular chainsaws. The event has been described as "[m]ore of an engineering challenge than a day-of competition" because of this. In it, competitors will cut cookies — circular disks from logs — of certain specifications as quickly as they can. Competitors view it as the hardest event, but also a favourite. Before beginning the cut, they are usually allowed to warm up their saws in what is called the "pit row", often with mechanics.

== Saw-building ==
The tools used for the event have been called the "most ridiculous modified chainsaw[s]", and are known to walk the line between performance and failure due to their homemade nature. However, as many as 99% of professional competitors don't build their own hot saw, instead buying them from specialist engineers, with 80% of saws on the American circuit built by Russ Lemke; Lemke's saws match reliability with power and have been called "the Stradivarius of its ilk" by Stihl. Several are also built and sold by event record-holder Matt Bush, who is also a talented saw-builder. Bush ran his saw at 404cc, about the highest that has been managed.

The total cost of each hot saw is about $10,000 but can last for decades, with requirements in the event rarely changing. Lemke also recommends constant maintenance of the saws, but also talks about how saw-building is just as exciting as the event itself.

== Safety ==
Due to the power of the chainsaws, safety is taken seriously. The athletes wear face and hearing protection, and chaps, sometimes with other chainsaw safety clothing, and there are shields protecting the audience because of the 20-foot throw of woodchips. Competitors may also wear chainmail under their chaps, and many have saws with safety switches in case they get out of control and need to be quickly stopped. All the people within 15' of a live hot saw must wear hearing protection, too.

== Variations ==
=== Stihl Timbersports ===
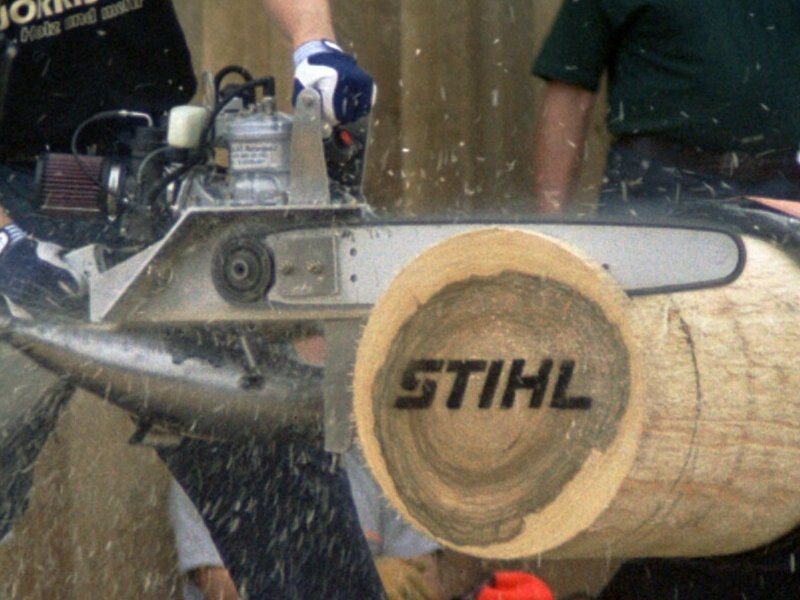
"Stihl" is burnt into or marked on the log and brands the resulting cookies

In Stihl Timbersports, the hot saw event sees competitors race to cut three cookies from a horizontal log. The first cut is going down, the second back up. The athletes have to be very strong and skilled, with chainsaws having a chain speed of 240 km/h, a weight of 27 kg, and engines typically having between 62 and 100 horsepower. The Timbersports rules on hot saws are:

1. It is limited to one cylinder; this rule was put in place after Lemke showed up at the Wisconsin State Championship with a two-cylinder, seen as unfair and dangerous
2. It has a tuned exhaust
3. It has a sprocket cover

The competitor must cut no more than 6" from the log, which is marked with a black line. They will also be disqualified if their cookies are not whole. Competitors are also allowed to have a helper, who performs two roles: getting the saw started in the warm-up beforehand, which is a minute, and also cool the saw down.

The current world record is 4.62 seconds, achieved by Adam Lethco in 2022.

=== Two-man competition ===
Some competitions are designed for a hot saw that can be held by two woodsmen, often with larger engines that may have been originally designed for cars. Most of these are local.

=== Lumberjack Championship ===
In the Lumberjack World Championship, a one cylinder engine chainsaw is used to make three cuts, first down, then up in a white pine log. The chainsaws are off before the time starts, and cannot be self-starting or simple start engines. The record was set by Dave Bolstad of New Zealand in 2007 with a time of 5.55 seconds.
