= Henry Gugler =

American artist and engraver

- Born: Johann Heinrich Gugler; September 27, 1816; Württemberg Germany
- Died: September 6, 1880 (aged 63)
- Other name: Henry
- Occupation: Engraver
- Notable work: Abraham Lincoln engraving

Johann Heinrich “Henry” Gugler also known as Henry Gugler (September 27, 1816 - September 6, 1880) was an engraver for the US Bureau of Engraving and Printing. His most important work was an engraving of Abraham Lincoln. The Lincoln engraving was used on the United States five-dollar bill beginning with the Series of 1928.

== Early life ==
In 1816 Henry Gugler was born in Württemberg Germany. While in Germany Gugler learned the engraving trade; he focussed on creating book illustrations. He spent three years at an art school in Stuttgart Germany. In 1853, he emigrated to the United States with his wife and his six year old son Julius.

== History ==
After the United States Civil War he began working for the National Note Bureau. At the bureau he focussed on creating engravings for a variety of financial instruments. He was hired at the US Bureau of Engraving and Printing (BEP) on January 15, 1863.

Gugler executed the center portrait that appeared on the obverse of the United States 1869 United States five-dollar bill known as the "Woodchopper" note. Gugler engraved the center image on the obverse which portrayed a pioneer family. Also in 1869, Gugler completed his most important work, an engraving of Abraham Lincoln which was based on an 1865 painting by John H. Littlefield. The Lincoln engraving took Gugler three years to complete. The engraved image was used on the United States five-dollar bill beginning with the Series of 1928; the bill featured the portrait of Lincoln.

== Gallery ==
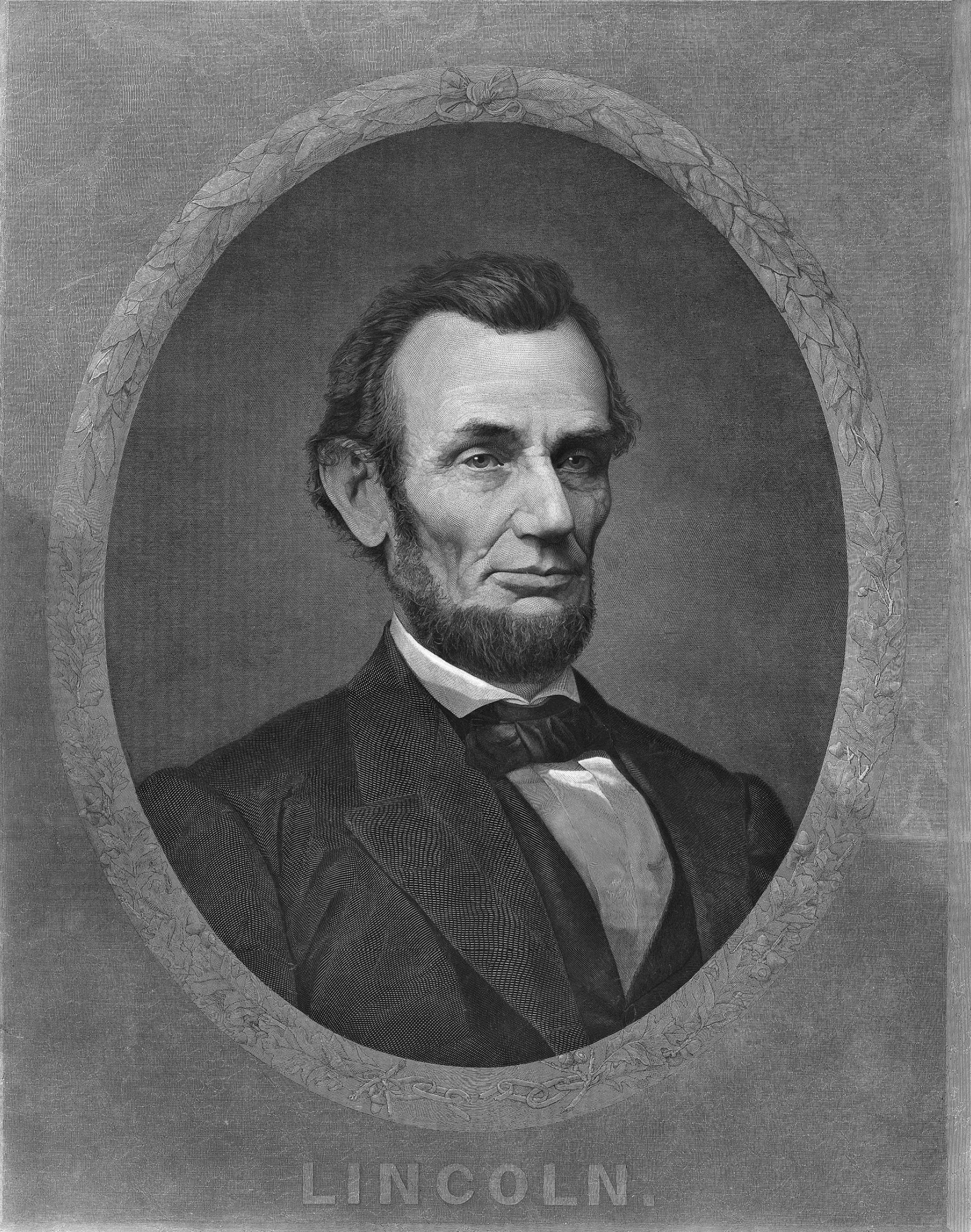
Engraving of Abraham Lincoln by Henry Gugler

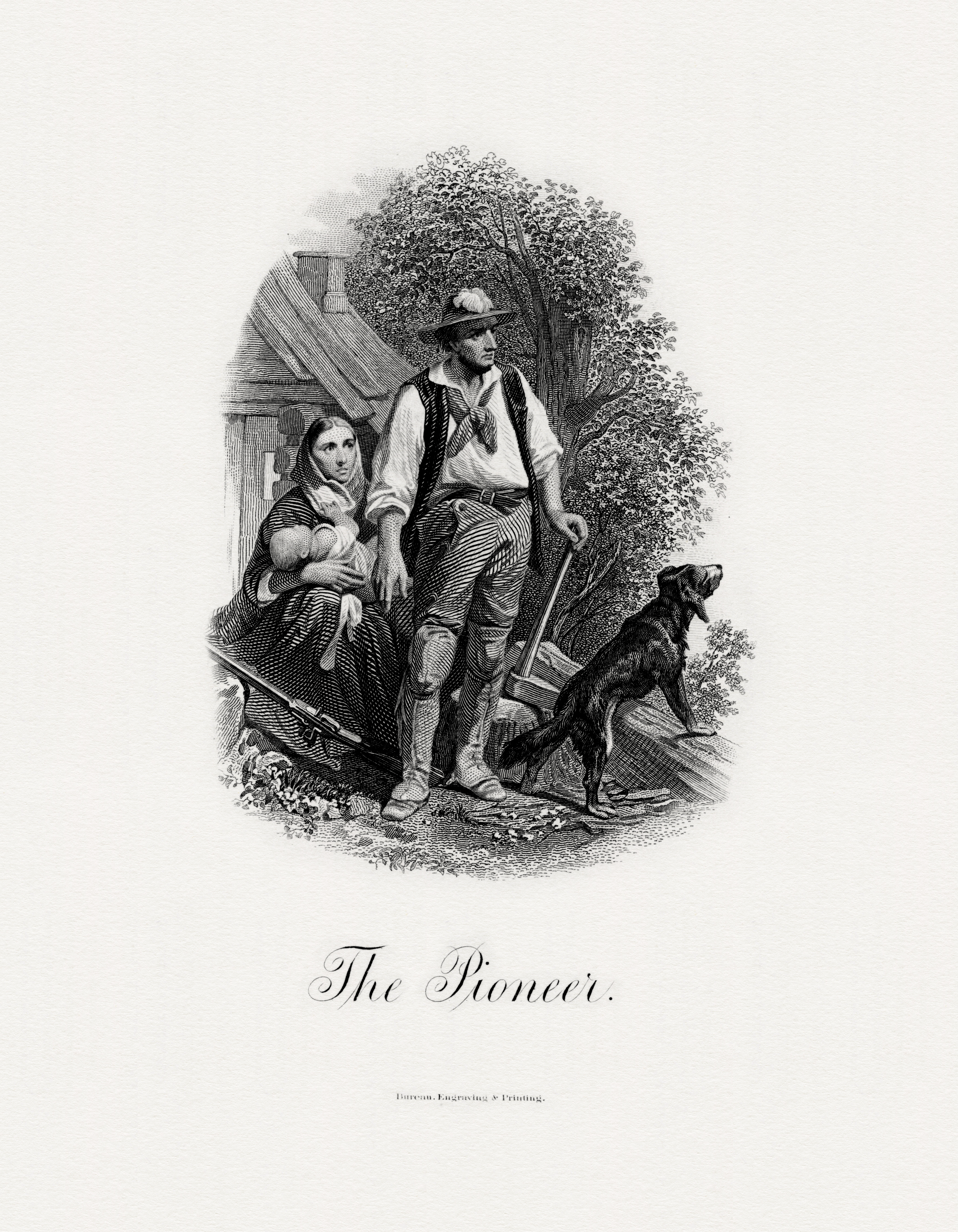
Gugler vignette - The Pioneer (Woodchopper) on the obverse of the 1869 United States five-dollar bill

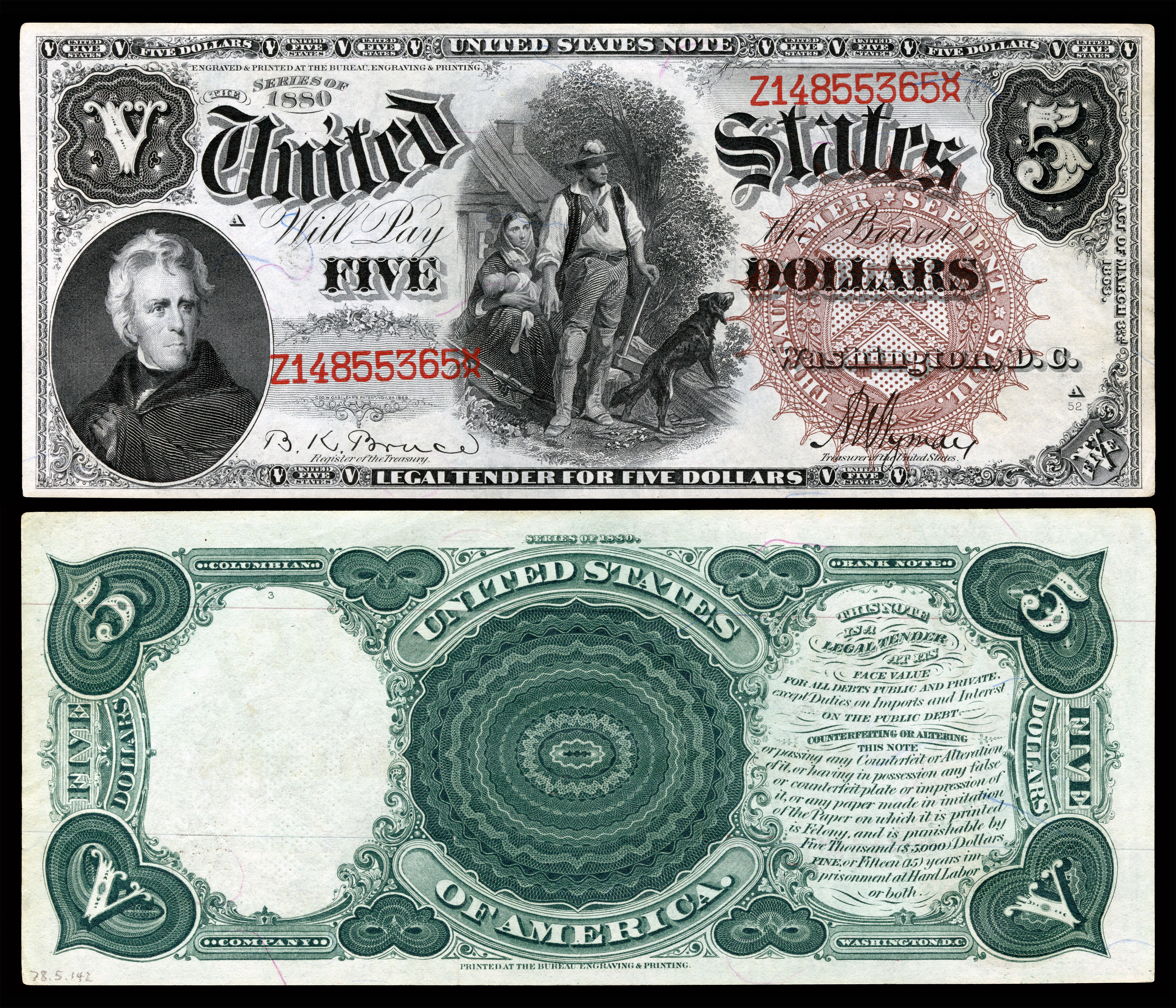
Woodchopper Note
