= Ned Shewry =

John Edward Shewry MM (1889 – 1 August 1962), was a world champion woodchopper from New Zealand. Born in Stratford, New Zealand, he was one of 11 children of John and Elizabeth Shewry. The Shewrys were early settlers in Tahora in the Eastern Taranaki hill country, where they set to clearing a large block of land on Moki Road for pasture between the Makino and Waitaanga forests. The felling of timber dominated the lives of the Shewry family, and growing up in this setting clearly left a lasting impression on young John Edward.

== Early life ==
At the age of 17, he took up farming with his older brother Archie on the neighboring block and set to work clearing the land with "just a couple of axes, a saw and a packet of matches". He quickly developed good skills and technique with an axe, and soon caught the eye of the local bushman Hughie McLeod, who entered Shewry in the chopping events at the 1909 Whangamōmona sports day.

After a terrible first chop, Shewry quickly picked up his act, and returned the next year to win the local competition. In 1911, he won in Eltham, the "Mecca of axemen", and carried on his winning streak at a number of other chopping events around Taranaki and the King Country.

== International competition in 1912 ==
In 1912, he competed in Auckland against world champion Dave Pretty, and Australian greats Bill Peck and Charlie Miley, and beat them all. Shewry went on to compete in Australian events in Brisbane, Toowoomba, Rockhampton and MacKay, then returned to New Zealand to win the world championship in Eltham, winning the 24-inch (61 cm) championship, the visitors' trophy for the 15-inch (38 cm) standing chop and the 12-inch (30 cm) underhand chop.

== World War I ==
Shewry's woodchopping career was interrupted by World War I, and in 1915, he and his brother David joined the New Zealand Cycling Corps and served in Egypt, France and Belgium. Shewry's war service was recognised with the Military Medal for bravery, which he received for saving an officer's life while under fire. Tragically, though, his brother David died from injuries received in France in 1917. Ned was twice wounded in battle, but when he returned home he was a fit man keen to return to the woodchopping arena.

== International competition from 1921 to 1934 ==
In 1921, Shewry won the world championship 24-inch (45 cm) chop at Gisborne, and smashed the Australasian record for the 12-inch (30 cm) kahikatea chop with a time of 25 seconds - 8.4 seconds faster than the record set by Dave Pretty in 1908. Over the next few years Shewry travelled around New Zealand demonstrating his skills at fairs and carnivals. In 1925 he won the Australasian title at the Dunedin Exhibition, the right and left-handed chop at North Auckland, the 18-inch (45 cm) at Hamilton, and the 18-inch underhand at Taihape.

== Retirement ==
Shewry's involvement in competitive woodchopping stretched for a period of over 20 years until he retired in 1934 at the age of 45. He purchased a land in Ōpunake where he farmed for a number of years, and moved to a small farm on Corbett Rd at Bell Block. In 1960, he gifted his competition axes and cups to the Taranaki Museum (now Puke Ariki).

While many environmental activists today consider woodchoppers and timber-fellers of old as nature-hating barbarians, this could not have been further from the truth of Shewry. In later life he became involved with the high-profile Pukeiti Gardens at the foot of Mount Taranaki, and was a keen supporter of the Taranaki Rhododendron Trust. His involvement with Pukeiti ranged from weeding and planting to helping design the layout of the reserve. He was described as a tireless collector of rare and good plants as well as an "indefatigable propagator". His own garden at Bell Block was "filled with lilies, bulbs and shrubs".

Shewry died at age 73 on 1 August 1962, and was buried at the St. Mark's Church Cemetery in Lepperton, Taranaki, beside his brother Archie. His friend Rob Hair described him in his obituary as "Ned Shewry, world champion axeman, footballer, bush feller, farmer, plant lover a hard headed businessman, frugal in affairs of his own, generous with those he liked; keen brained, a hard hitter in debate, and the wielder of a sly and devastating wit."

In his will, Shewry bequeathed to Pukeiti Gardens the bulbs, lilies, shrubs and trees from his garden along with £1200 toward the Summit Road project. He left the whole of his residuary estate to the Pukeiti Rhododendron Trust - with the proviso that "if it could survive for more than 20 years it deserved to have the land." In 1985 the money from Ned's estate was used to help build a gatehouse at Pukeiti and further expand the gardens. A bar-café opened in Stratford in 1993 was named "Axemen's Inn" in honour of Shewry.
