= Stihl Timbersports Series =

Lumberjack competitions

The Stihl Timbersports Series is a series of woodsman or wood chopping competitions where the athletes compete in the use of axes and saws in manners typical for lumberjacks. It was founded in 1985, and currently includes six different disciplines, with both professional and collegiate divisions. The terms 'timbersports' and 'timber sports' are trademarked by Stihl Inc.

== History ==
Stihl Timbersports began in 1985, and the earliest broadcasts were made from a field in Wisconsin, United States, using a single camera on a forklift. At this time, there was no overall Series championship. Instead, awards were given for performances in individual events on venues around the country. Stihl, however, had a vision of a series that would bring the best athletes together and let them compete in several events and thus determine who was the best overall lumberjack.

With the help of Granite State Lumberjack Shows, the series evolved and has since become a very prestigious competition. Athletes from all around the world take part in the Series with European athletes taking part in the Series since 2005.

The Series has also spawned a college series, the Stihl Timbersports Collegiate Series, involving over 60 collegiate woodsman teams in the US and Canada. The winner of this series automatically receives a seed for next year's professional series.

The Canadian Series created their first Women's Professional Division in 2013. 2017 marks the creation of their first Women's Professional Division.

The Series celebrated its 30th anniversary in the spring of 2015.

== About ==
The Series involves both men and women competitors. There are currently three divisions: Men's Rookie Division, Men's Professional Division and Women's Professional Division. The Pro Women's Division consists of either three or four disciplines: Underhand Chop, Single Buck, Stock Saw, and optionally Standing Block Chop. The four disciplines completed by the Men's Rookie Division are Underhand Chop, Standing Block Chop, Single Buck and Stock Saw. The six disciplines completed by the Men's Professional Division are Underhand Chop, Standing Block Chop, Spring Board, Single Buck, Hot Saw and Stock Saw.

In order to be chosen as a Stihl Timbersports Athlete, one must fill out an application form and an athlete resume. The resume consists of the best times with each discipline. After the application process they choose the top eight athletes from the East Coast for each division and the top eight from the West Coast. The Men's Professional Division automatically move on to the National Championship. The Men's Rookie and the Women's Professional Division have Qualifier Competitions on each coast, where the result being the top four competitors from each division move onto the National Championship. The Men's and Women's Professional Division does not have a maximum age limit. The Men's Rookie Division has a maximum age limit of 25. Currently there is not an established World Championship for the top female competitor. The men's divisions both compete for the top spot to move onto the World Men's Championship and the World Rookie Championship which is held in the European Union every fall. If one wins the World Rookie Division then one automatically must move up to compete in the Men's Professional Division. The Men's Professional Division also compete for spots on Team Canada to partake in the World Relay Champion's Trophy, also held in Europe every fall.

== Events ==
The Series currently involves six disciplines.

- Springboard - The competitor uses two spring boards to ascend to the top of a nine-foot pole and chop a firmly attached 12" diameter block from the top of the pole. The block must be chopped from both sides.
- STIHL Stock Saw - Competitors begin with both hands on the log. When the signal is given, the sawyers, using identical STIHL professional MS661 C-M chain saws with a 20-inch bar and 33RSC3 chain, make two cuts through identical logs. No more than 4" of wood, which is marked by a black line, can be cut.

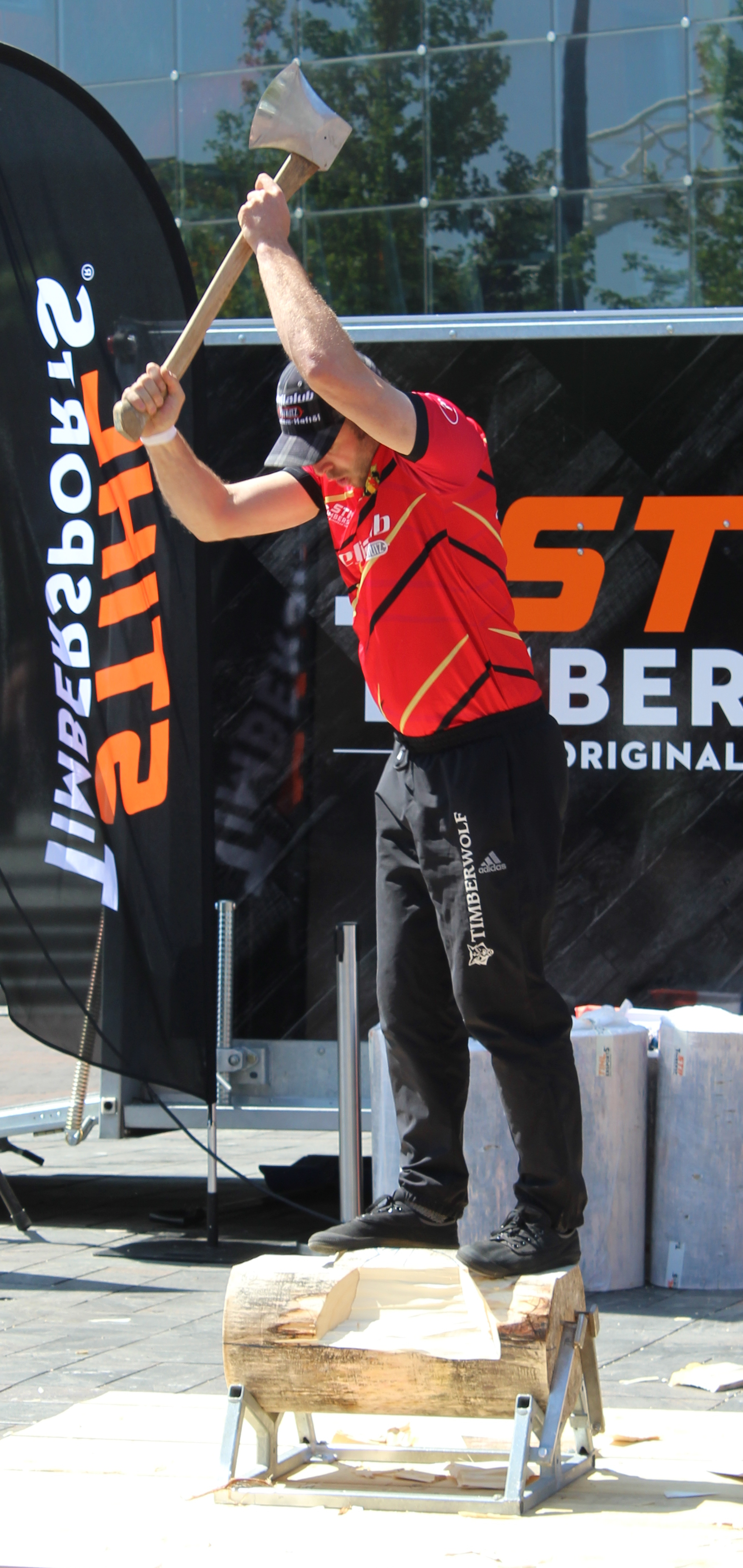
Underhand chop

- Underhand Chop - The competitor stands, feet apart, on a 12"-14" log. At the signal, he or she begins chopping through the log. Before chopping all the way through he or she must turn and complete the cut from the other side. Time ends when the log is severed completely.
- Single Buck - Competitors make one cut through 18"-20" of white pine using a single person cross cut saw. The competitor may have a helper to wedge the log and keep the saw lubricated. Time ends when the block is clearly severed.

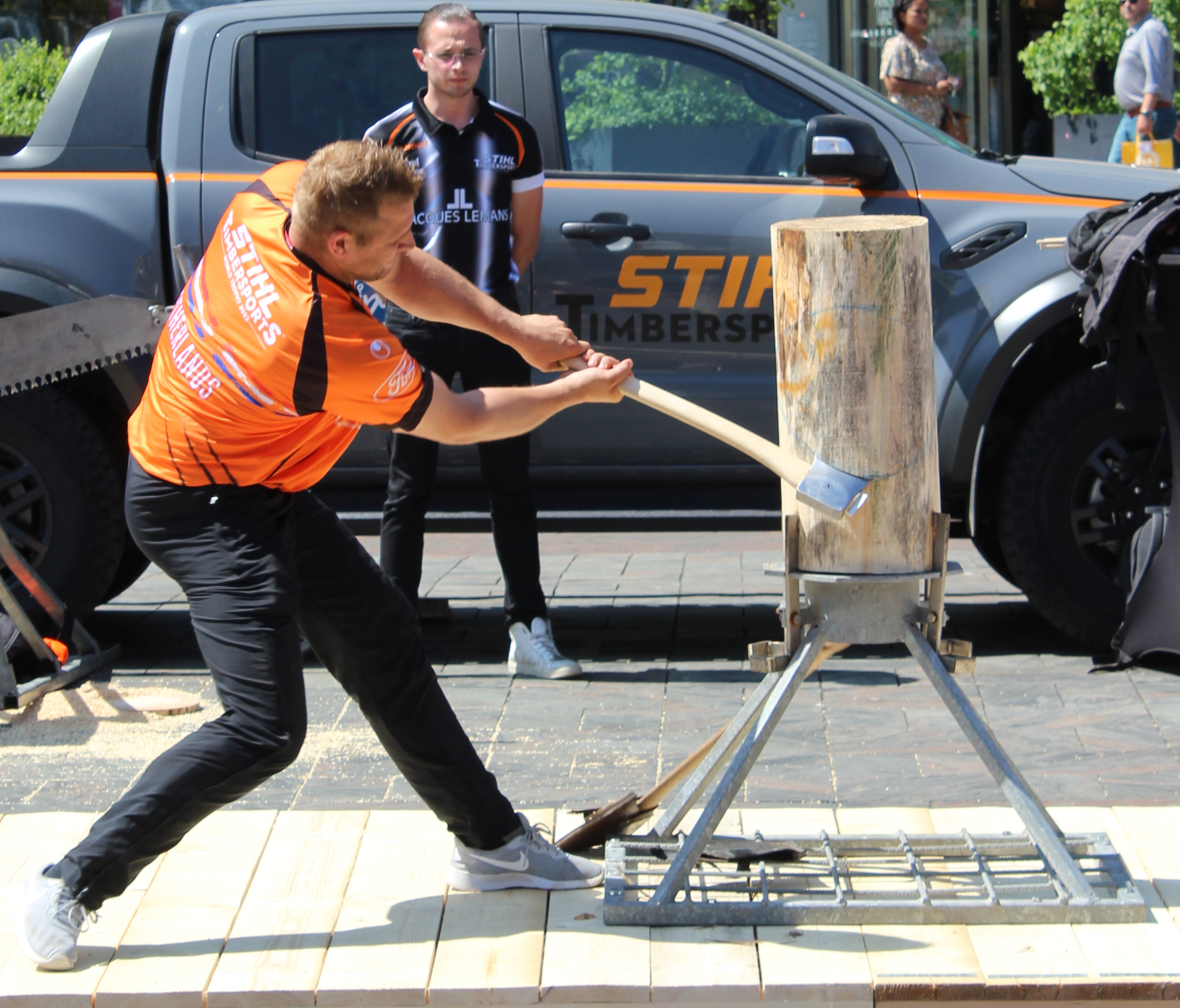
Standing block chop

- Standing Block Chop - Competitors race to chop through 12"-14" of white pine. The competitor must chop from both sides of the log and the time ends when the block is severed.
- Hot Saw - In this event the competitor uses a customized chain saw with a modified engine. At the signal, the competitor starts the saw and makes three cuts. The competitor must cut no more than 6" from the log which is marked with a black line.

== Records ==
=== World records ===
- Springboard - 35.67 seconds, set by Stirling Hart in 2016, with a wood diameter of 11"
- Stock Saw - 9.445 seconds, set by Martin Komarek in 2010, with a wood diameter of 16"
- Standing Block Chop - 12.11 seconds, set by Jason Wynyard in 2003, with a wood diameter of 12"
- Underhand Chop - 12.28 seconds, set by David K. Bolstad in 1999, with a wood diameter of 13"
- Single Buck - 9.395 seconds, set by Jason Wynyard in 2007, with a wood diameter of 19"
- Hot Saw - 4.83 seconds, set by Adam Lethco 2022, with a wood diameter of 19"
- Relay - 45.10 seconds, set by Australia in 2018 - teammates Brad De Losa, Brayden Meyer, Glen Gillam and Jamie Head

=== American records ===
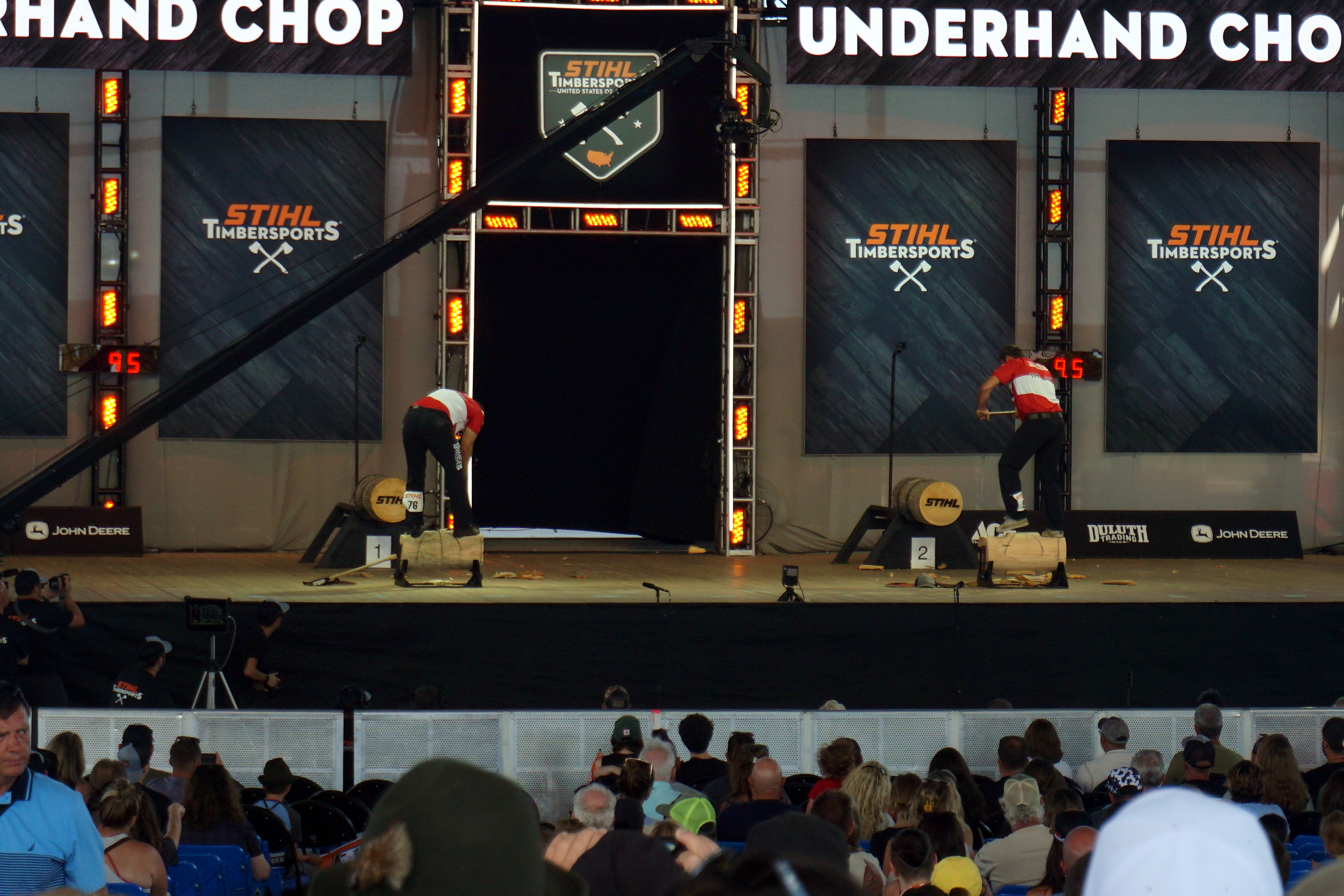
Stihl Timbersports U.S. Men's Championship Finals at German Fest 2023 in Milwaukee

- Springboard - 39.96 seconds, set by Matt Bush in 2004, with a wood diameter of 11"
- Stock Saw - 9.67 seconds, set by Logan Scarborough in 2015, with a wood diameter of 16"
- Standing Block Chop - 13.15 seconds, set by Matt Bush in 2003, with a wood diameter of 12"
- Underhand Chop - 13.78 seconds, set by Matt Cogar in 2017, with a wood diameter of 13"
- Single Buck - 10.34 seconds, set by Dave Jewett in 2015, with a wood diameter of 19"
- Hot Saw - 5.085 seconds, set by Matt Bush in 2003, with a wood diameter of 19"
- Relay - 51.45 seconds, set by American teammates Jewett, Cogar, Lentz and Willard in 2015

=== Australian records ===
- Springboard - 45.17 seconds, set by Brayden Meyer in 2017, with a wood diameter of 11"
- Stock Saw - 11.45 seconds, set by Brad De Losa in 2016, with a wood diameter of 16"
- Standing Block Chop - 14.10 seconds, set by Mitch Argent in 2017, with a wood diameter of 12"
- Underhand Chop - 16.41 seconds, set by Glen Gilliam in 2019, with a wood diameter of 13"
- Single Buck - 14.71 seconds, set by Brad De Losa in 2015, with a wood diameter of 19"
- Hot Saw - 6.03 seconds, set by Brad De Losa in 2016, with a wood diameter of 19"

=== Canadian records ===
- Springboard - 35.67 seconds, set by Stirling Hart in 2016, with a wood diameter of 11"
- Stock Saw - 11:87 seconds, set by Ben Cumberland in 2016, with a wood diameter of 16"
- Standing Block Chop - 15:15 seconds, set by Nathan Cumberland in 2016, with a wood diameter of 12"
- Underhand Chop - 20:60 seconds, set by Marcel Dupuis in 2016, with a wood diameter of 13"
- Single Buck - 11:23 seconds, set by Ben Cumberland in 2016, with a wood diameter of 20"
- Hot Saw - 9:04 seconds, set by Stirling Hart in 2016, with a wood diameter of 20"

== Television coverage ==
The Series is currently seen by over 20 million viewers annually on a variety of networks across 62 countries, including ABC, ESPN, Eurosport, Outdoor Channel, Stadium and more. It is recognized as the longest running show on ESPN other than SportsCenter. Tommy Sanders has served as on-air host of the American Series since 1985, whilst Dan Anstey has hosted the Australian edition since 2017.

== Timbersports Champions ==
Each year across the US and world, Timbersports athletes battle to be named series champion. The Timbersports Series champions since the competition's inception are:

=== Series Champions ===
- 1985 - (United States) Mike Sullivan
- 1986 - (United States) Mel Lentz
- 1987 - (United States) Rolin Eslinger
- 1988 - (United States) Mel Lentz
- 1989 - (United States) Rolin Eslinger
- 1990 - (United States) Mel Lentz
- 1991 - (United States) Mel Lentz
- 1992 - (United States) Mel Lentz
- 1993 - (United States) Rolin Eslinger
- 1994 - (United States) Matt Bush
- 1995 - (United States) Mel Lentz
- 1996 - (United States) Harry Burnsworth
- 1997 - (New Zealand) Jason Wynyard
- 1998 - (New Zealand) Jason Wynyard
- 1999 - (New Zealand) Jason Wynyard
- 2000 - (New Zealand) Jason Wynyard
- 2001 - (New Zealand) David Bolstad
- 2002 - (New Zealand) Jason Wynyard
- 2003 - (New Zealand) David Bolstad
- 2004 - (New Zealand) David Bolstad
- 2005 - (United States) Matt Bush
- 2006 - (New Zealand) Jason Wynyard
- 2007 - (New Zealand) David Bolstad
- 2008 - (New Zealand) David Bolstad
- 2009 - (New Zealand) Jason Wynyard
- 2010 - (New Zealand) Jason Wynyard
- 2011 - (New Zealand) Jason Wynyard
- 2012 - (New Zealand) Jason Wynyard
- 2013 - (Australia) Brad De Losa
- 2014 - (New Zealand) Jason Wynyard
- 2015 - (New Zealand) Jason Wynyard
- 2016 - (New Zealand) Jason Wynyard
- 2017 - (New Zealand) Jason Wynyard
- 2018 - (Australia) Laurence O'Toole
- 2019 - (Australia) Brayden Meyer
- 2021 - (United States) Jason Lentz
- 2022 - (Australia) Brad De Losa
- 2023 - (Australia) Jamie Head
- 2024 - (United States) Nate Hodges
- 2025 - (New Zealand) Jack Jordan

=== World Relay Champions ===
- 2010 - New Zealand
- 2011 - Australia
- 2012 - New Zealand
- 2013 - New Zealand
- 2014 - Australia
- 2015 - Australia
- 2016 - Australia
- 2017 - New Zealand
- 2018 - Australia
- 2019 - Australia
- 2022 - Australia
- 2023 - Australia
- 2024 - Australia
- 2025 - Australia

=== World Rookie Champions ===
- 2014 - (Canada) Nathan Cumberland
- 2015 - (Canada) Ben Cumberland
- 2016 - (Canada) Ben Cumberland
- 2017 - (Sweden) Ferry Svan
- 2018 - (Australia) Daniel Gurr
- 2019 - (New Zealand) Chris Lord
- 2022 - (Australia) Jack Argent
- 2023 - (Poland) Szymon Groenwald
- 2024 - (Australia) Matt Coffey

=== United States Champion ===
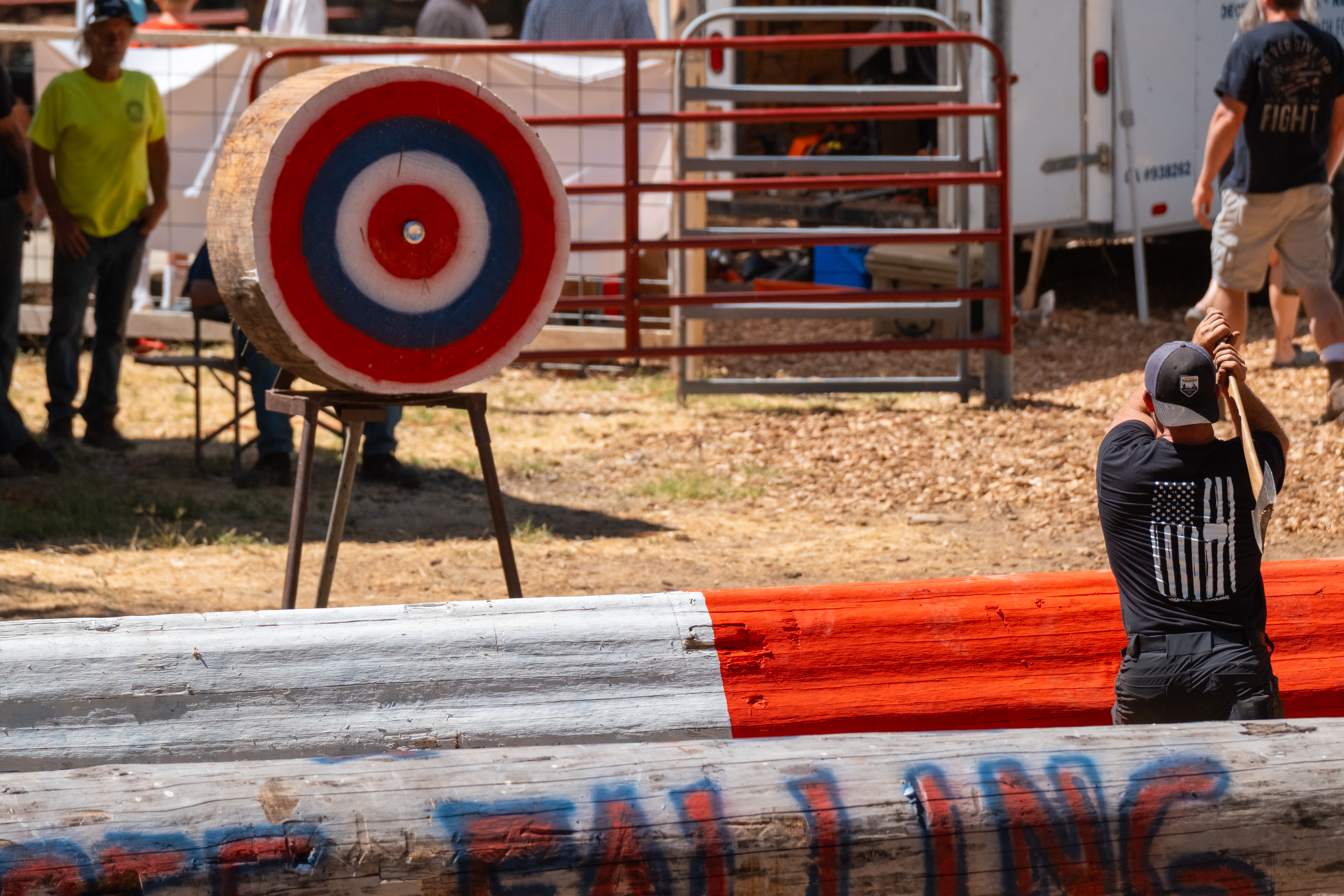
Nate Hodges, 2025 U.S. STIHL Timbersports champion, competing in the axe throw at the Mid-Sierra Loggers Jamboree.

- 2008 - (United States) Arden Cogar Jr.
- 2009 - (United States) Arden Cogar Jr.
- 2010 - (United States) Arden Cogar Jr.
- 2011 - (United States) Melvin Lentz
- 2012 - (United States) Arden Cogar Jr.
- 2013 - (United States) Matt Cogar
- 2014 - (United States) Matt Cogar
- 2015 - (United States) Matt Cogar
- 2016 - (United States) Matt Cogar
- 2017 - (United States) Matt Cogar
- 2018 - (United States) Matt Cogar
- 2019 - (United States) Cassidy Scheer
- 2021 - (United States) Jason Lentz
- 2022 - (United States) Matt Cogar
- 2024 - (United States) Nate Hodges
- 2025 - (United States) Nate Hodges
- 2026 - (United States) Matt Cogar

=== British Champion ===
- 2012 - (United Kingdom) Spike Milton
- 2014 - (United Kingdom) Robert Chatley
- 2015 - (United Kingdom) Elgan Pugh
- 2016 - (United Kingdom) Elgan Pugh
- 2017 - (United Kingdom) Elgan Pugh
- 2018 - (United Kingdom) Elgan Pugh
- 2019 - (United Kingdom) Elgan Pugh
- 2021 - (United Kingdom) Elgan Pugh
- 2022 - (United Kingdom) Glen Penlington

=== European Champion ===
- 2002 - (Switzerland) Thomas Gerber
- 2003 - (Czech Republic) Martin Komarek
- 2004 - (Czech Republic) Martin Komarek
- 2005 - (Czech Republic) Martin Komarek
- 2006 - (Czech Republic) Martin Komarek
- 2007 - (Germany) Dirk Braun
- 2008 - (Germany) Dirk Braun

=== European Champion crew ===
- 2004 - United Kingdom
- 2005 - France
- 2006 - Switzerland
- 2007 - Switzerland
- 2008 - Czech Republic

=== Canadian Champion ===
- 2005 - (Canada) J.P. Mercier
- 2007 - (Canada) J.P. Mercier
- 2014 - (Canada) Stirling Hart
- 2015 - (Canada) Marcel Dupuis
- 2016 - (Canada) Stirling Hart
- 2017 - (Canada) Mitch Hewitt
- 2018 - (Canada) Nathan Cumberland
- 2021 - (Canada) Marcel Dupuis
- 2022 - (Canada) Marcel Dupuis

=== Canadian Men's Rookie Champion ===
- 2014 - (Canada) Nathan Cumberland
- 2015 - (Canada) Ben Cumberland
- 2016 - (Canada) George Williams
- 2017 - (Canada) Thomas Henderson
- 2018 - (Canada) Connor Morse
- 2022 - (Canada) Thian Carman

=== Canadian's Women's Champion ===
- 2016 - (Canada) Janet Walker
- 2016 - (Canada) Caitlin Carroll
- 2017 - (Canada) Kelly Bowness
- 2018 - (Canada) Anita Jezowski
- 2021 - (Canada) Janet Walker
- 2022 - (Canada) Ally Briscoe

=== Hall of Fame ===
Each year, starting in 2015, the Stihl Timbersports Series celebrates athletes who have made an impact in the sport by inducting them into the Timbersports Hall of Fame. Here are the inductees:

- Carson Bosworth - 2016
- Harry Burnsworth - 2016
- Spike Milton - 2016
- David Bolstad - 2015
- Matt Bush - 2015
- Rolin Eslinger - 2015
