= David Bolstad =

David Kelvin Bolstad (12 May 1969 – 19 November 2011) was a New Zealand representative woodchopper. He was Stihl Timbersports Series champion five times between 2001 and 2008. His father Sonny Bolstad was also a New Zealand representative axeman. David Bolstad died suddenly in 2011 after winning a competition in the town of Waiuku.
