= Jason Wynyard =

New Zealand woodchopper (1973–2023)

Jason Wynyard MNZM
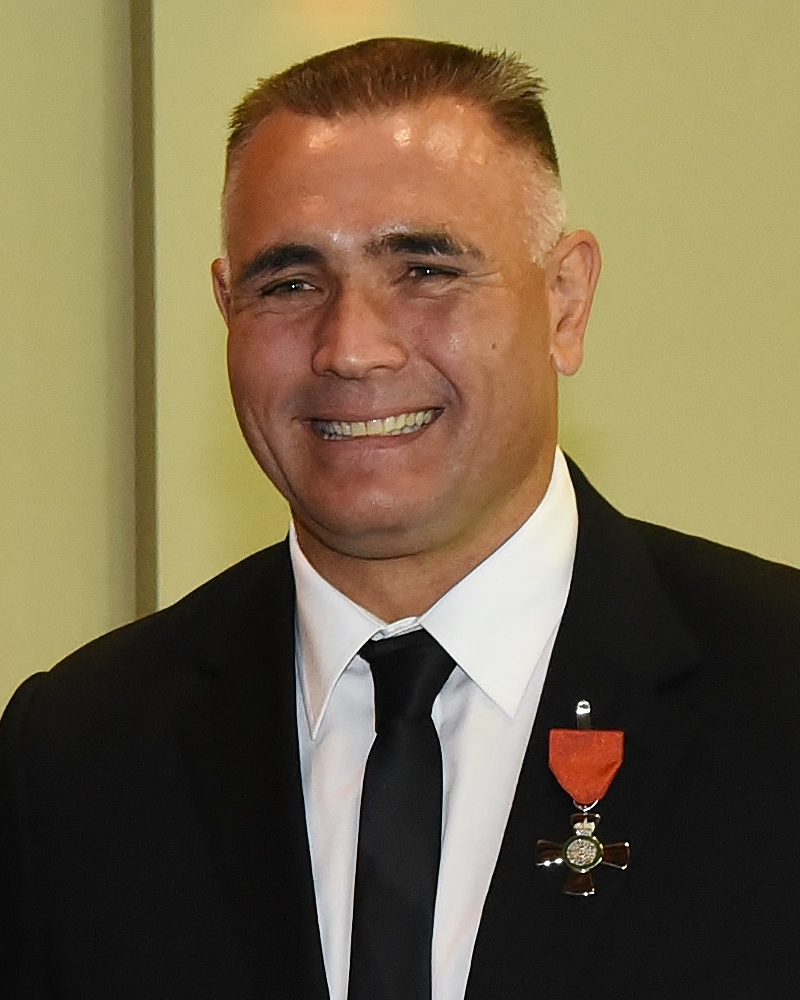
- Wynyard in 2017

Personal information
- Born: 14 November 1973 Te Awamutu, New Zealand
- Died: 4 October 2023 (aged 49)
- Home town: Kawakawa, New Zealand
- Education: Waitākere College
- Height: 1.95 m (6 ft 5 in)
- Weight: 134 kg (295 lb)
- Relative: Tai Wynyard (son)

Sport
- Country: New Zealand
- Sport: Woodchopping

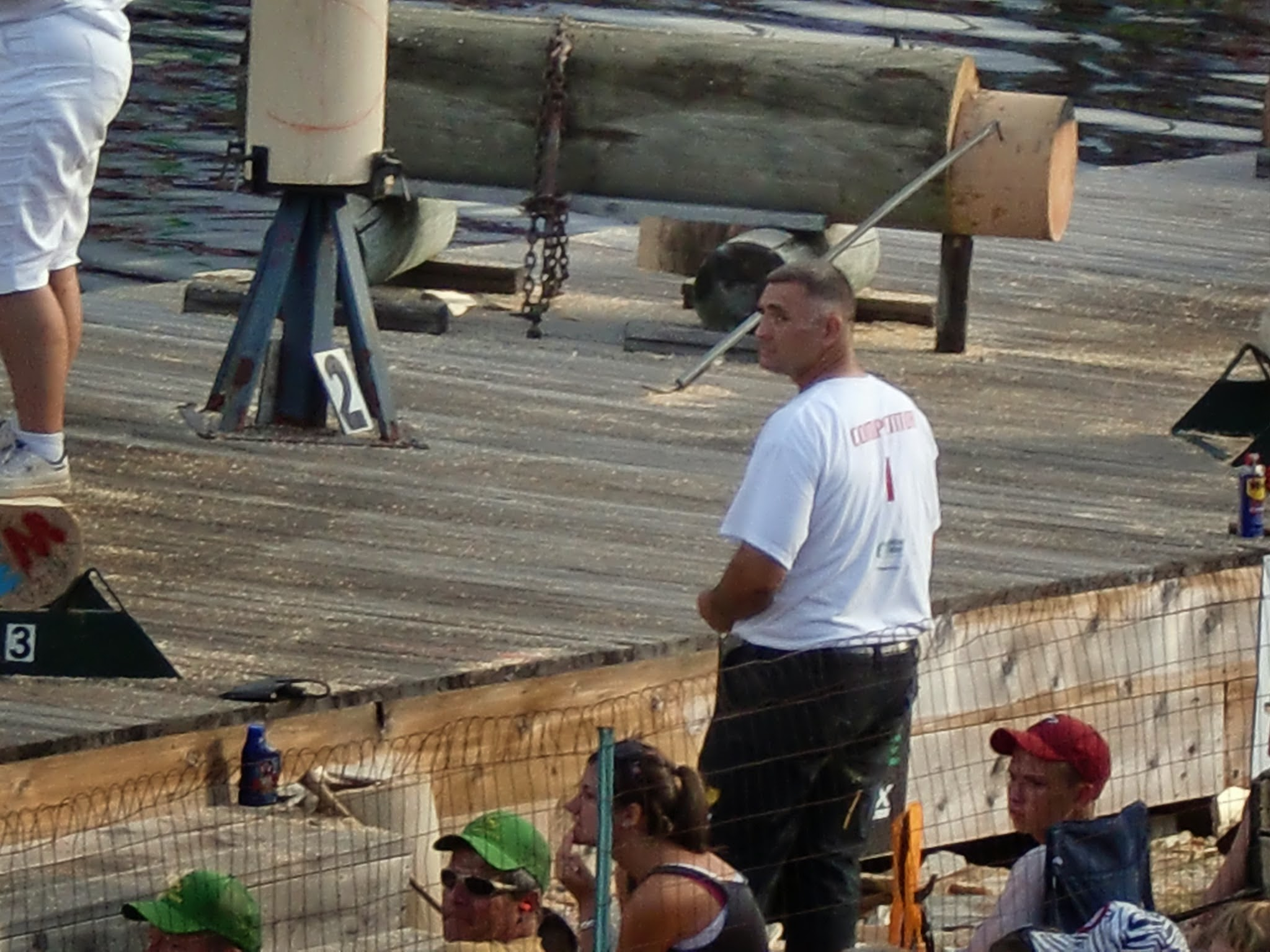
Wynyard at the Lumberjack World Championship in 2011

Jason Wynyard MNZM (14 November 1973 – 4 October 2023) was a New Zealand champion woodchopper from Kawakawa. He won over a hundred world titles in the sport, including the individual world championship nine times. He holds the world record for single buck (with assistant) with a time of 9.39 seconds in 2007.

Wynyard won the Stihl Timbersports Series 14 times. He won the title in 1997, 1998, 1999, 2000, 2002, 2006, 2009, 2010, 2011, 2012, 2014, 2015, 2016, and 2017.

In the 2017 New Year Honours, Wynyard was appointed a Member of the New Zealand Order of Merit, for services to the sport of woodchopping.

== Personal life and death ==
Wynyard was born in Te Awamutu on 14 November 1973. Of Māori ancestry, he affiliated to the Ngāti Maniapoto and Ngāpuhi iwi. He was educated at Waitākere College.

Wynyard was the father of former University of Kentucky men's basketball player Tai Wynyard.

In May 2023, it was announced that Wynyard had been diagnosed with stage 4 Burkitt lymphoma, and after undergoing aggressive treatment he was advised by doctors on 18 August that he had only weeks to live. He died on 4 October 2023, at the age of 49.
