= 1869 United States five-dollar bill =

United States five-dollar bill

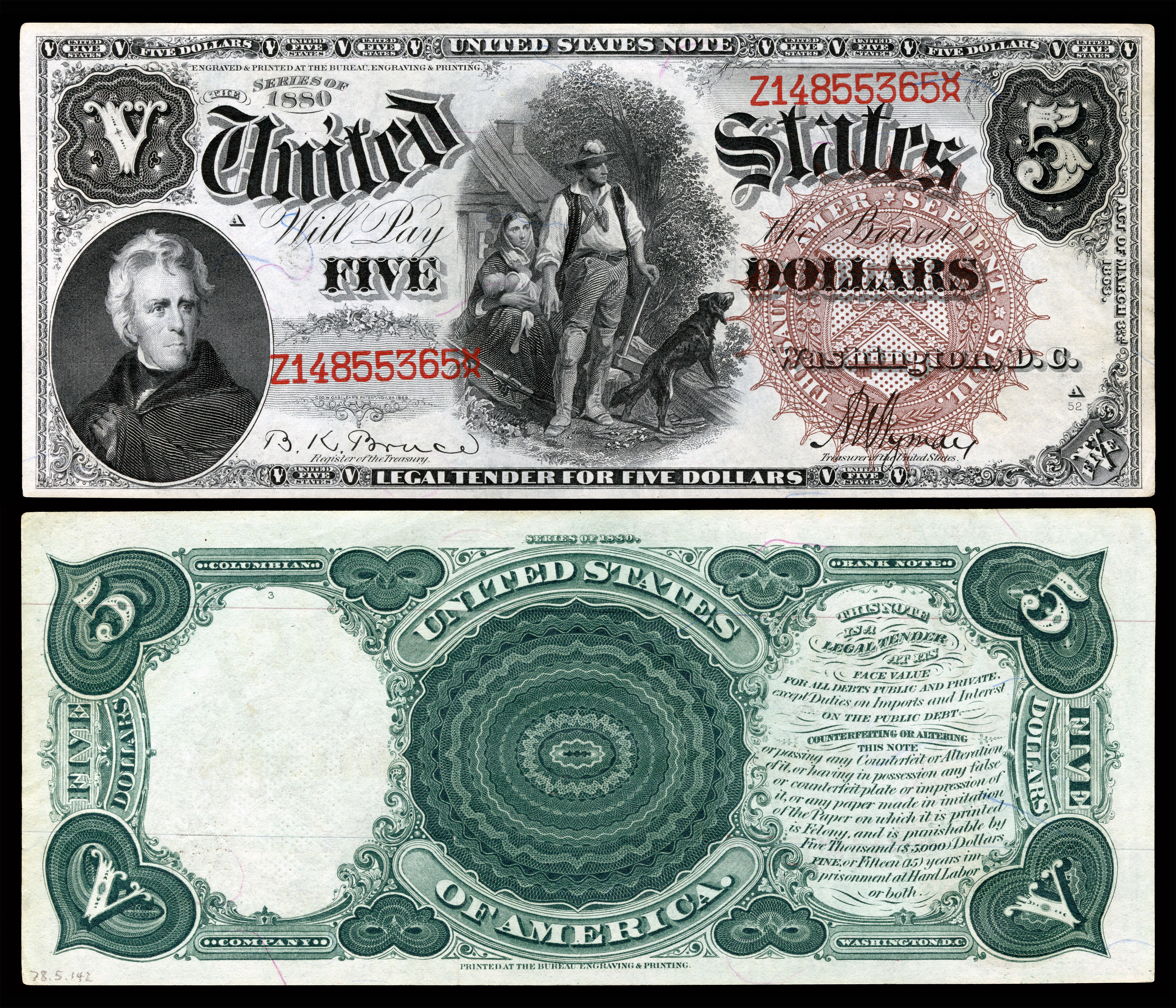
1880 Series United States five-dollar bill

1869 United States five-dollar bill also known as the Woodchopper Note is a legal tender bank note. It was a large-size US bank note measuring 7.125 in (181.0 mm) x 3.125 in (79.4 mm). The note was issued in five series from 1869 to 1907.

== Description ==
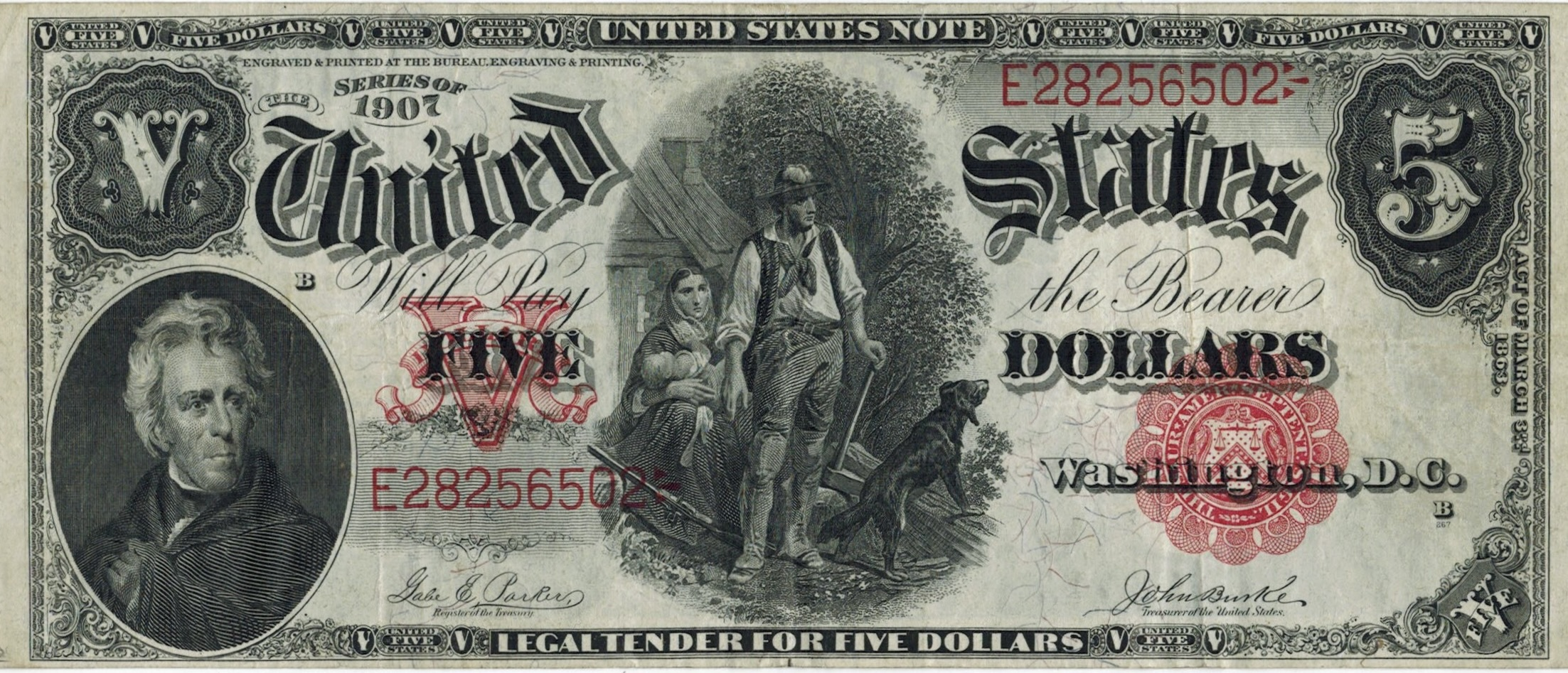
1907 Series United States five-dollar bill obverse

The note was known as the "Woodchopper Note" or "Pioneer Note" because there is a depiction of a man with an axe in the center of the obverse. It was a large-size US bank note measuring 7.125 in (181.0 mm) x 3.125 in (79.4 mm).

The central portrait on the obverse includes a man holding an ax; also pictured are a woman, a child and a dog. To the left of center on the obverse, is a portrait of former US president Andrew Jackson. The top of the obverse features the words "UNITED STATES NOTE". The middle on the obverse reads, "The United States Will Pay the Bearer Five Dollars". The bottom on the obverse contains the words, "Legal Tender For Five Dollars". The Reverse of the note carries the words, United States of America and on the right side the words:

THIS NOTE IS A LEGAL TENDER AT ITS FACE VALUE FOR ALL DEBTS PUBLIC AND PRIVATE. except Duties on Imports and Interest ON THE PUBLIC DEBT COUNTERFEITING OR ALTERING THIS NOTE or passing any Counterfeit or Alteration of it, or having in possession any false or counterfeit plate or impression of it, or any paper made in imitation of the Paper on which it is printed is Felony, and is punishable by Five Thousand ($5,000) Dollars FINE, or Fifteen (15) years imprisonment at Hard Labor or both.

== History ==
The engraving was based on a painting by Thomas Sully. Henry Gugler engraved the center image of the pioneer family. Some examples of the note in the 1907 series have an error on the reverse: the word public is misspelled "PCBLIC".

The note was the last $5 denomination that carried Andrew Jackson's likeness. The central portrait is thought to represent a pioneer family moving west. Example of the notes printed in the series of 1869 show that paper with a blue tint was used. The 1869 series also is referred to as a "Rainbow Note" based on the notes blue tint, red serial number and seal and a green hue.

=== Series ===
1. Series of 1869
2. Series of 1875
3. Series of 1878
4. Series of 1880
5. Series of 1907
