= Brad De Losa =

Australian fitter

Brad De Losa (born 1979) is an Australian fitter who is a champion at forestry sports such as wood-chopping and sawing. In 2015, he set a new world record, cutting through four tree trunks in less than 58 seconds. In May 2017 Brad De Losa managed to win the Stihl Timbersports Champions Trophy for a third year in a row.

De Losa won his first competition at the age of 16.
