= Woodchopping =

Sport involving axe and saw skills

Woodchopping (also spelled wood-chopping or wood chopping), called woodchop for short, is a sport that has been around for hundreds of years in several cultures. In woodchopping competitions, skilled contestants attempt to be the first to cut or saw through a log or other block of wood. It is often held at state fairs and agricultural shows. Participants (especially men) are often referred to as axemen.

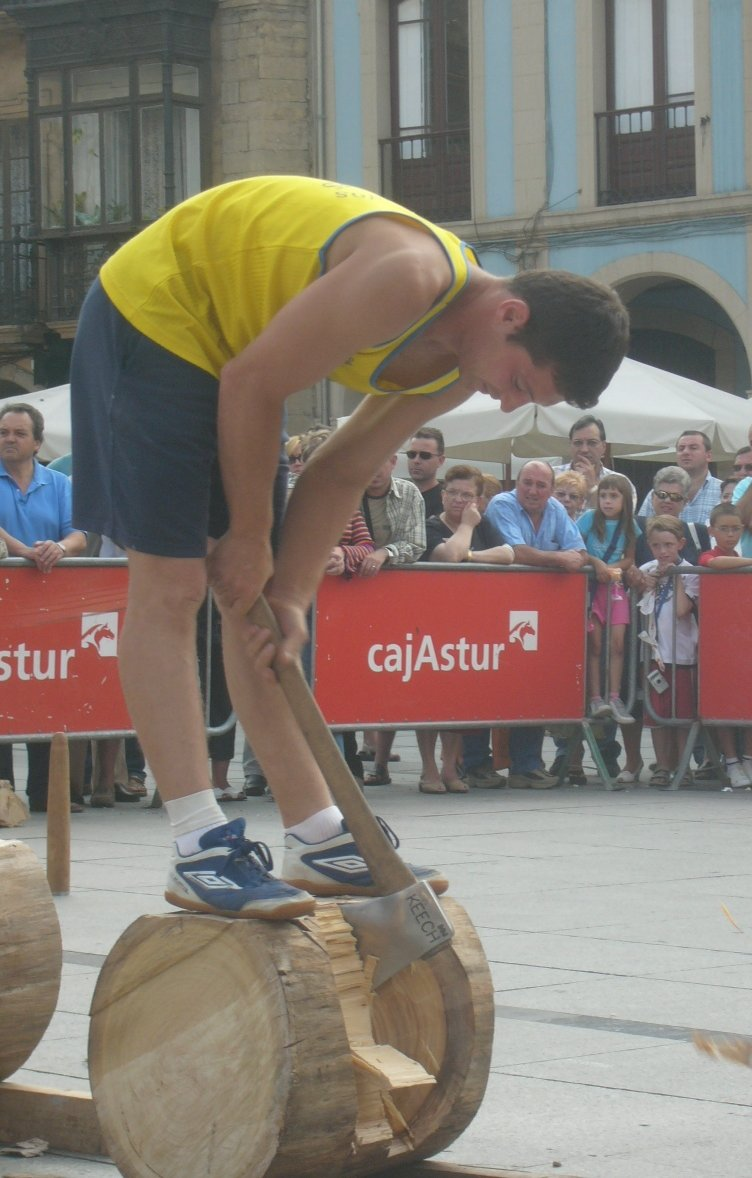
Woodchopping competition at Avilés, Spain

== History ==
The modern sport of woodchopping is said to have had its genesis in 1870 in Ulverstone, Tasmania, as the result of a £25 ($50) bet between two axemen as to who could first fell a tree. An alternative origin story comes from 16th century Basque Country, in which a man ran a marathon and chopped ten logs to be allowed to propose to his future wife.

The world's first woodchopping championship was held in 1891, at Bell's Parade, Latrobe, Tasmania. This event was celebrated and commemorated with the selection of the site to be the home of the Australian Axemen's Hall of Fame and Timberworks.

== Areas of practice ==
Woodchopping is practiced in regions where forestry is or has been an important part of the economy:

- In North America: in Canada and in the north of the United States.
- In Europe: in Austria, the Czech Republic, Germany, Netherlands, Norway, Switzerland, England, Slovenia, the Alpine region of France, the Basque Country, other parts of Spain (mainly in Asturias and Cantabria, but also in Castile and Madrid).
- In Australia and New Zealand.

== Events ==
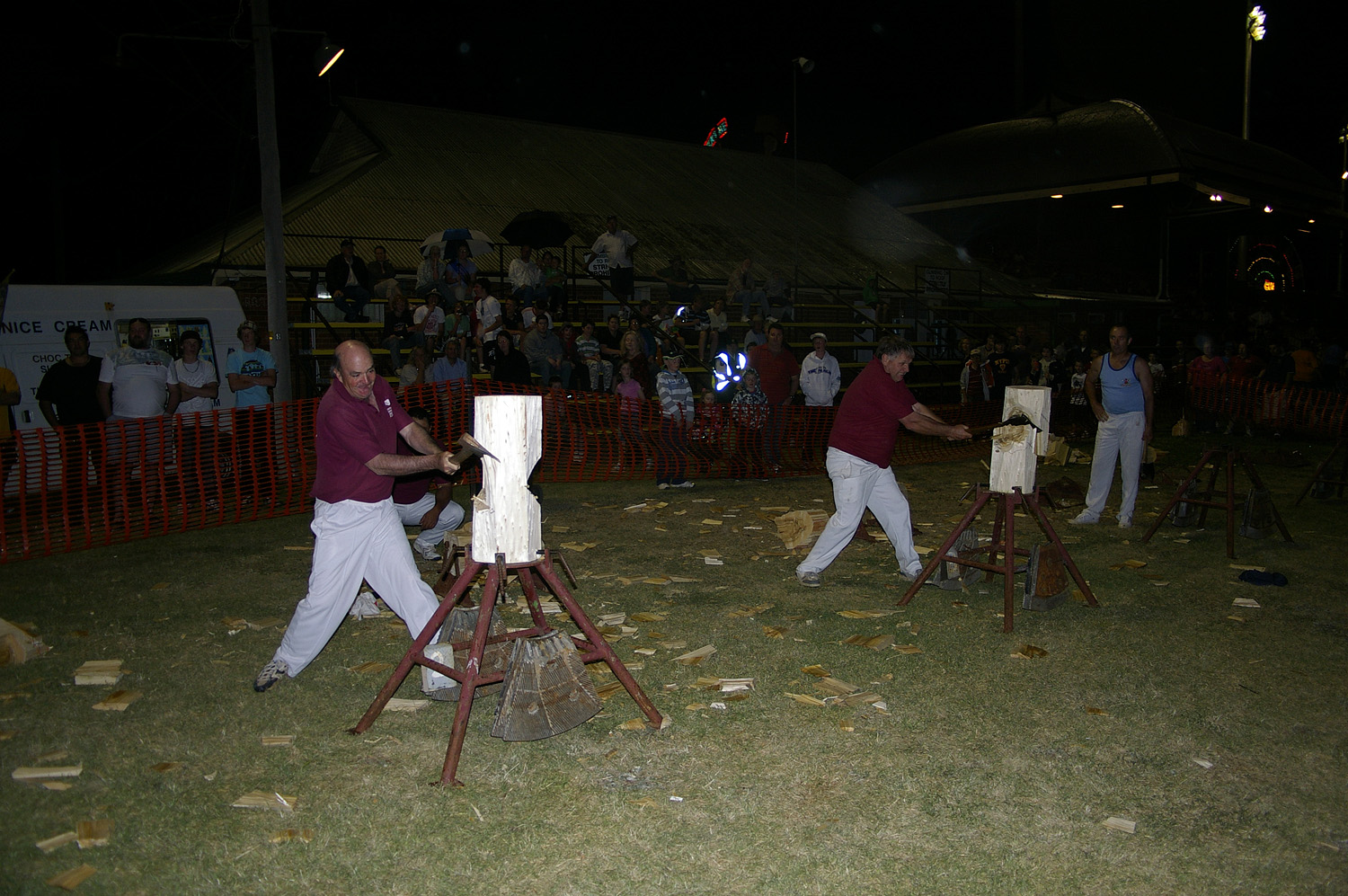
Standing block at the Wagga Wagga Show, Australia

Standing block cut with handicap start, Ekka, Brisbane, 2015 (audio/video 56s)

Many woodchopping events are handicap events, where the axemen start at different times, depending on how fast they are expected to chop through the log. In New Zealand and parts of Australia, each axeman's individual handicap is recorded in performance books which are graded on how many events they win and how many events they enter. Championship events are scratch events with no handicap, and typically use larger diameter logs (375 mm).

Handicap events may use logs of 250 mm to 350 mm, depending on the skill of the competitors. All competitors have the same size log; the handicap is based purely on time.

=== Standing block ===
This event is done by an individual cutting a scarf in one side. Once the first side has been completed the individual starts cutting another scarf on the opposite side, slightly higher than the first, generally about two inches higher but can vary with each axeman's individual preference.

=== Underhand ===
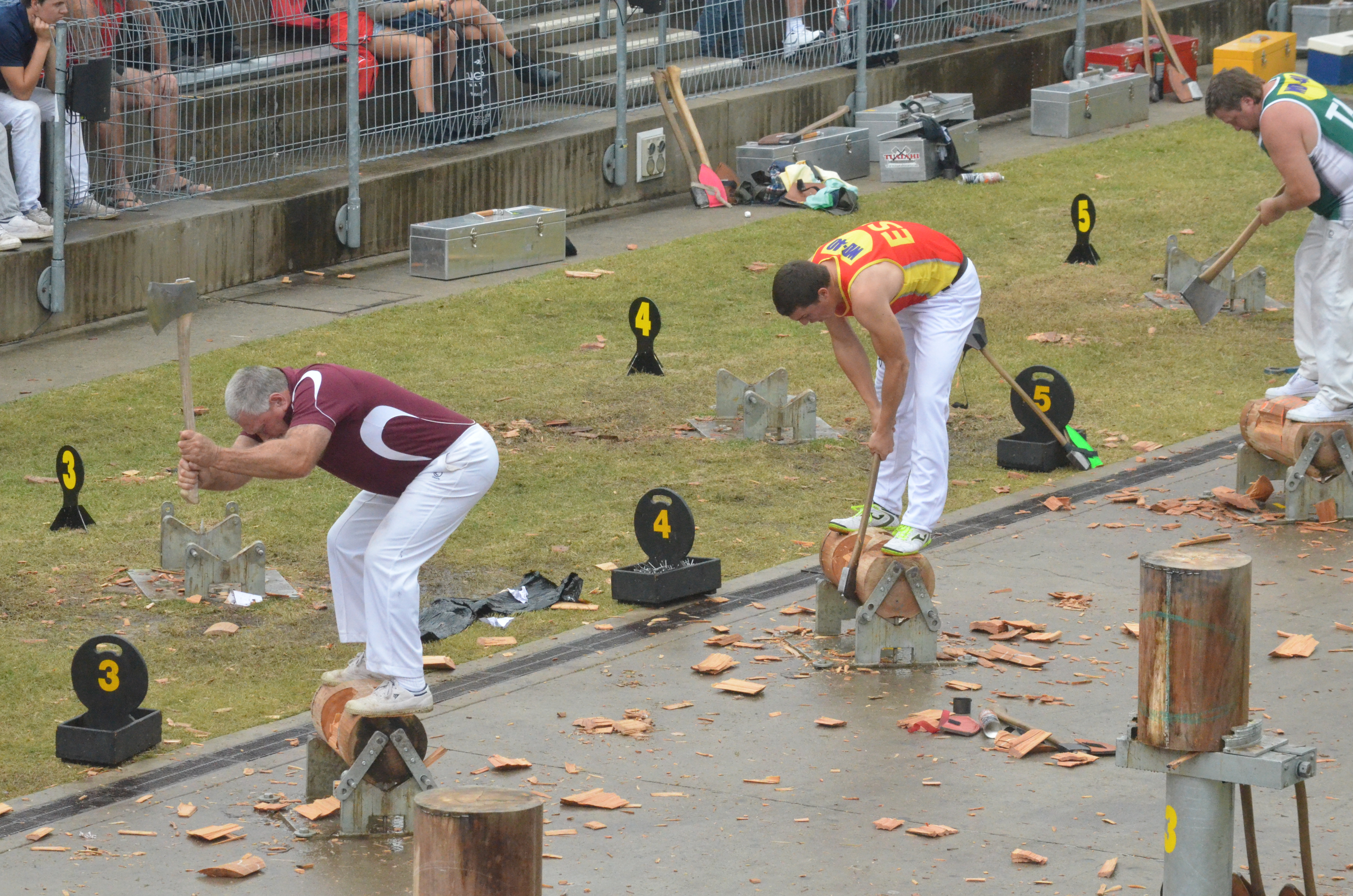
Underhand cutting

In this event, the axeman stands on the top of the log and uses a downwards motion to chop the log in two as fast as possible. This is done by cutting a scarf in the front side and then turning around on the block and completing it from the other side. These scarfs are generally offset from each other, the degree of offset depending on the size of the log and the axeman's preference.

=== Tree felling ===
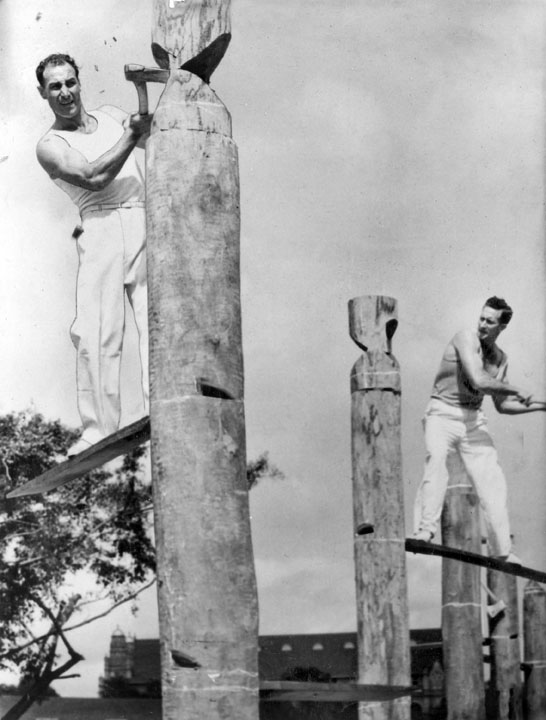
Tree felling

In this event the axeman cuts a small pocket in the side of a pole and jams a wooden jigger board with a metal shoe on the end of it into the hole. The shoe is designed to grip into the wood when pressure is put on it from the top. After the axeman has climbed onto his first board he then cuts another pocket and so on. Once up on his top board he proceeds to cut the block on the top of the pole.

There are two distinct versions of tree felling:

- The three board, which is most common in Australia and New Zealand. The axeman goes up one side of the pole and cuts his first scarf in the side of the block. The axeman then descends the pole and repeats this on the other side of pole. This event is seen as the marathon event of woodchopping and it typically lasts three to five minutes.
- The two (and one) board, commonly called the spring board, which is the most common in North America In the spring board the axeman climbs the one or two boards, then makes a large scarf in the front of the log – unlike on the ground where it is usually half and half. The axeman then turns around on the top board and chops through the block using downwards blows only. This event lasts 50 to 80 seconds, much less than the jigger board.

=== Single saw or single buck ===
This event is often considered the hardest discipline in woodchopping. The competitor pulls and pushes a razor sharp saw specifically designed for the event. The saws vary in length from five foot six inches to six foot four inches. The saws cost between $1500 and $2000.

=== Double saw or double buck ===
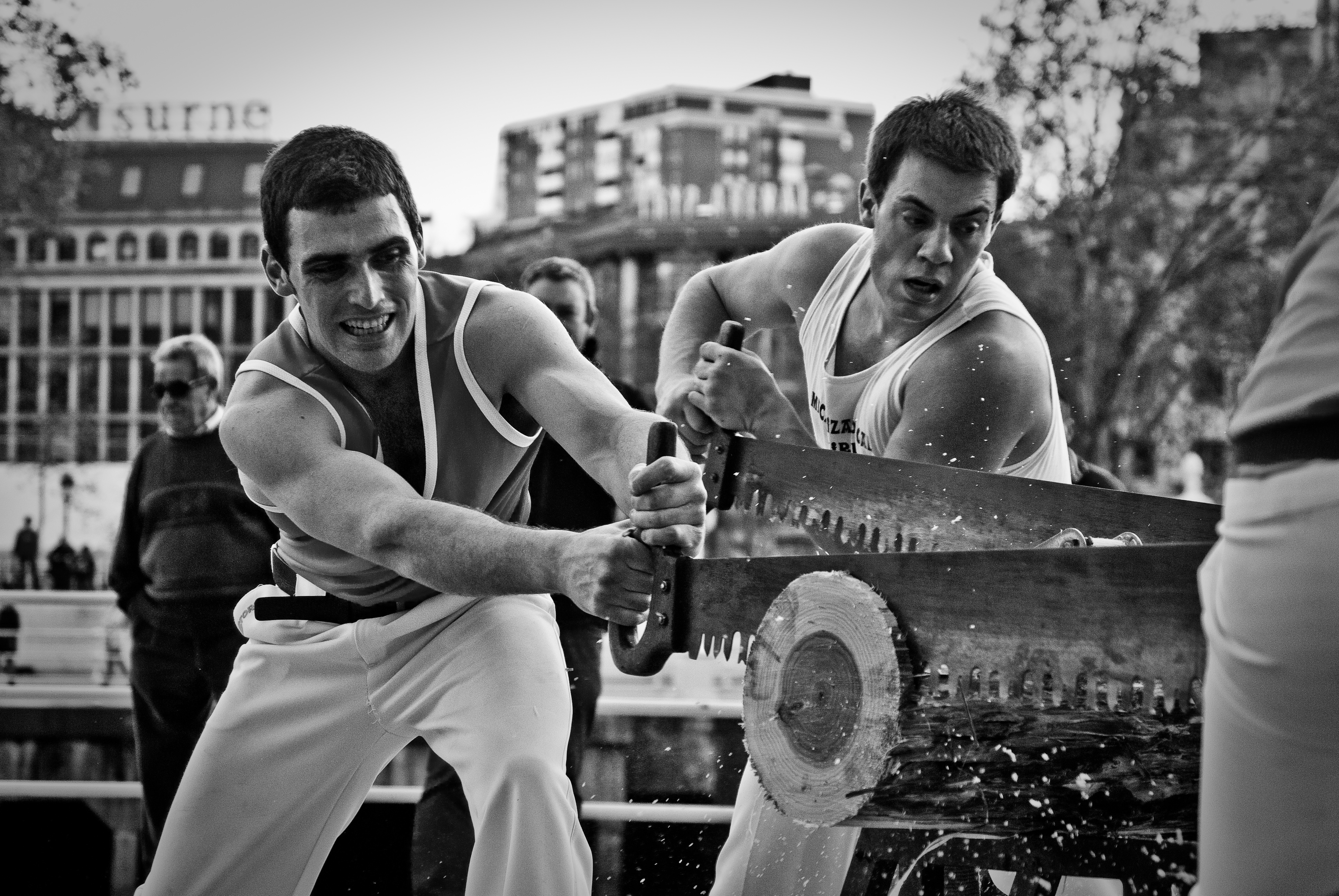
Woodchopping in the Basque Country

This event consists of two people pulling and pushing a saw to cut a log. It is far faster than the single saw event as there are two people using the saw yet times for this event can be two or three times faster in the same size wood. The saws used in double tend to be a lot hungrier, that is, they cut and draw more wood out with each stroke. This, however, makes it far harder to push and pull the saw.

=== Stock saw ===
In this event the axemen use identically tuned and sharpened chainsaws to cut through a log, once downwards and once upwards, within a 3-inch space of wood. The competitor starts with their hands on top of the log. On a buzzer the axeman picks up the saw and pulls the starting cord and then makes his first cut downward, then his second cut upward. If the saw does not start that is just bad luck and they get a slow time. If the axeman takes more than the allocated wood then they are disqualified and no time is recorded.

=== Hot saw ===
This event is often the crowd's favourite, and certainly the loudest. It uses a large homemade methanol-run chainsaw. The saws used by top competitors are typically snowmobile engines cut in half and are far heavier than regular chainsaws. The start for this event is exactly the same as the stock saw except the log is bigger and the axeman has to do three cuts: the first in a downwards motion, the second upwards, and the third down. This event is the fastest by far, lasting between five and seven seconds.

== Equipment ==
- Axes are the main piece of equipment used in the sport of woodchopping. As there are many different types of wood, there are naturally a large variety of axes.
- Purpose-built racing saws have developed over the years into two different types – the peg and raker saw and the 'm tooth' saw. There are a number of different suppliers of gear that sell to the select market of woodchoppers.
- Also used in chopping wood, although alone would not likely get the job done, is a wedge and sledgehammer.

== Different types of woods ==
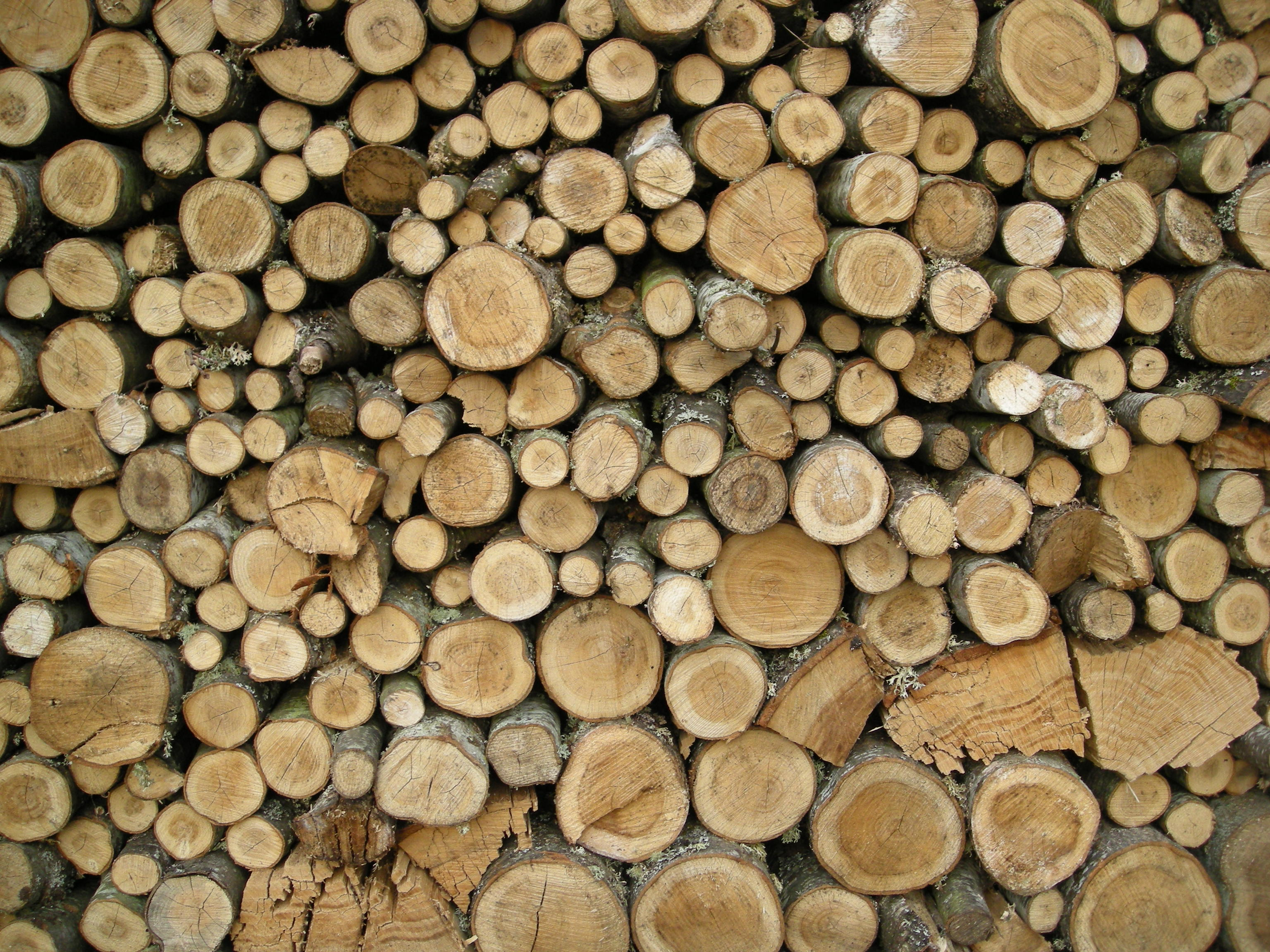
Chopped and stacked oak wood

Many different types of wood are used in the sport and they vary between countries. Common woods used in competition in Australia are gum, mountain ash, woolley butt and poplar. The most common woods cut in New Zealand are radiata pine (Pinus radiata), poplar and Pinus strobus. Woods cut in America include white pine, alder, aspen frozen wood and cotton wood.

== Woodchopping by country ==
The rules of the sport vary from country to country.

=== Australia ===
Woodchopping events in Australia are generally run in conjunction with agricultural shows. Competitions can run for up to 10 days, with over 100 competitors at each show.

In the Jack Pollard's 1968 or 1969 editions of the Ampol's Australian Sporting Records, woodchopping records have appeared to have been recorded from the 1920s.

The Axeman's Hall of Fame is located in Latrobe, Tasmania. The peak body for the sport in Australia is the Australian Axemen's Association.

=== Basque Country ===
The sport is called aizkolaritza in Basque from aizkolari 'woodchopper'. The sport is very popular and competitions are common at most festivals.

=== New Zealand ===
New Zealand is a leading country in the sport of woodchopping, having had the world's top two competitors, Jason Wynyard and David Bolstad, who between them won 19 of the 21 Stihl Timbersport Series titles between 1997 and 2017. Competitions are generally held at A & P shows, but there are also shows dedicated to woodchopping.

=== United Kingdom ===
Organisations arranging woodchopping competitions in the United Kingdom include British Lumberjack Sports Association (BLSA) and UK Loggers (UKL). Teams included the Cumbria Axemen, who appeared at the Westmorland County Show from 1999 to 2021 before disbanding.

== See also ==
- Lumberjack World Championship
- Stihl Timbersports Series
- Woodsman
