= Ballon d'Or =

Annual association football award

- Previous: 70th Ballon d'Or; 26 October 2026; Next: 71st Ballon d'Or; 2027
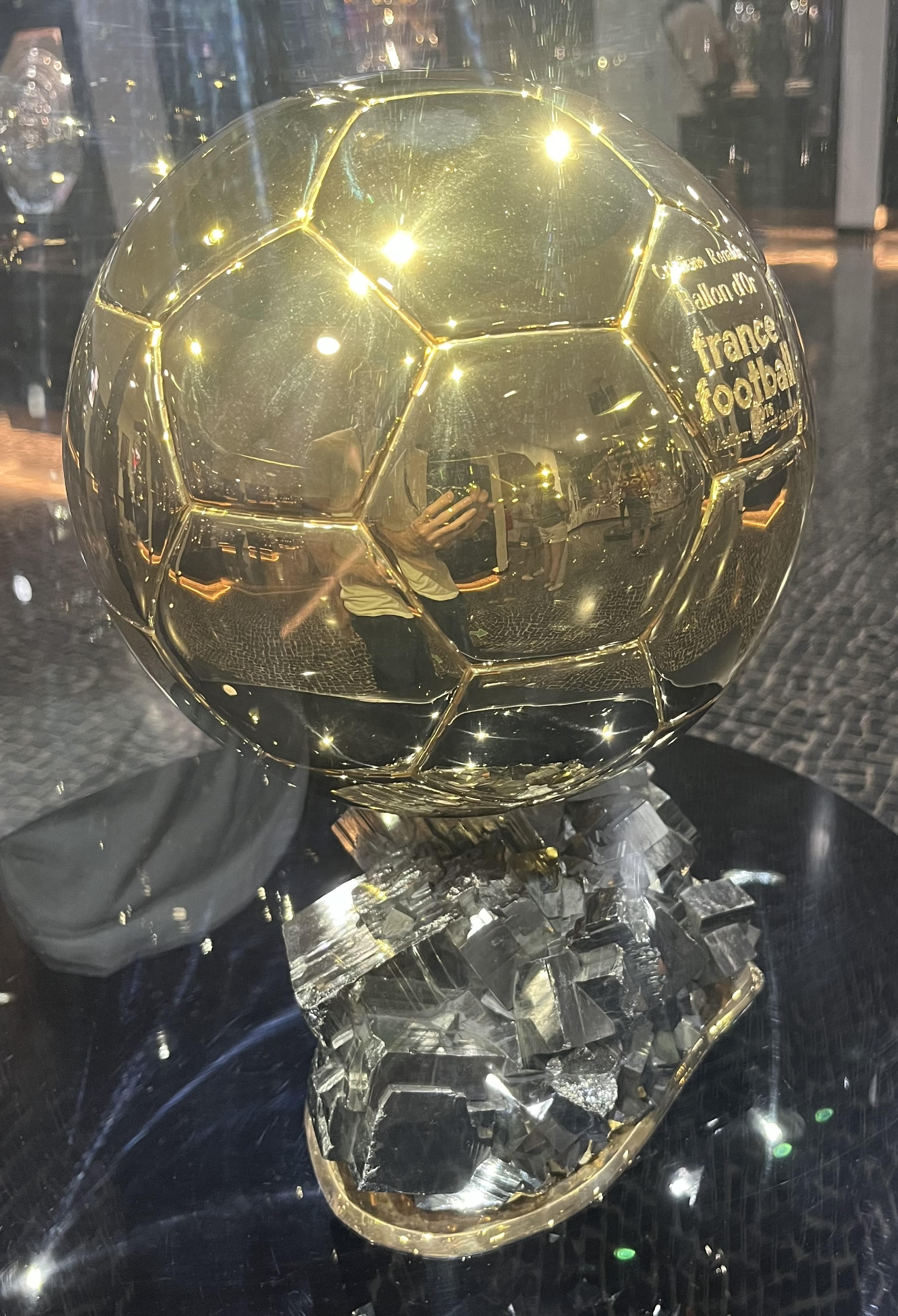
- The Ballon d'Or trophy
- Awarded for: Best performing football player of the season
- Presented by: France Football
- First award: 18 December 1956; 69 years ago
- Currently held by: (England) Harry Kane (1st win)

Highlights
- Most awards: (Argentina) Lionel Messi (8 awards)
- Most nominations: (Portugal) Cristiano Ronaldo (18 nominations)
- Website: ballondor.com
- Related: Additional awards

The Ballon d'Or (French pronunciation: [balɔ̃ dɔʁ]; lit. 'Golden Ball') is an annual association football award presented by French magazine France Football since 1956 to honour the player judged to have performed the best over the previous season.

Conceived by sports writers Gabriel Hanot and Jacques Ferran, the Ballon d'Or was based exclusively on voting by football journalists up until 2006. Originally, it was awarded only to players from Europe and was also known as the European Footballer of the Year award. In 1995, the Ballon d'Or was expanded to include all players of any origin active at European clubs. The award became a global prize in 2007 with all professional footballers being eligible; additionally, coaches and captains of national teams were also given the right to vote, before reverting to just journalists in 2016.

Between 2010 and 2015, in an agreement with FIFA, the award was merged with the FIFA World Player of the Year and rebranded as the FIFA Ballon d'Or. That partnership ended in 2016, and the award reverted to the Ballon d'Or, while FIFA also reinstated its own separate annual award, The Best FIFA Men's Player. In 2022, France Football modified the rules for the Ballon d'Or. The timing was changed so that the award is based on a football season rather than a calendar year, and an international jury of specialized journalists—one representative per country from the top 100 in the latest FIFA Men's World Ranking—was introduced to determine the winner. UEFA has co-organized the Ballon d'Or gala since 2024, with France Football retaining the voting system and the Ballon d'Or name.

Lionel Messi has won the Ballon d'Or a record eight times, followed by Cristiano Ronaldo with five. Johan Cruyff, Michel Platini and Marco van Basten have each won the award three times, while Alfredo Di Stéfano, Franz Beckenbauer, Kevin Keegan, Karl-Heinz Rummenigge and Ronaldo have each won it twice. Harry Kane is the current holder of the award, having won its 70th edition in 2026.

== Overview ==
December 1956 issue of France Football magazine presenting the inaugural Ballon d'Or winner—Stanley Matthews.

The Ballon d'Or is widely regarded as the most prestigious individual award in football. Prior to 2007, it was based exclusively on voting by football journalists and was also known as the continental European Footballer of the Year award. Even after 2007, it was usually identified with and referred to by that name because of its origin as a European award, until it was merged with the FIFA World Player of the Year award cementing its new worldwide claim. Stanley Matthews of England was the inaugural winner of the award, and the oldest player to ever win it—at 41 years, 321 days old.

Liberia's George Weah, the only African recipient, became the first non-European to win the award in 1995, the year that rules of eligibility were changed and the Ballon d'Or was expanded to include all players of any origin active at European clubs; two years later, Ronaldo of Brazil became the first South American without a European citizenship to claim the award, and he is still the youngest winner ever at 21 years, 96 days old. The award became a global prize in 2007 with all professional footballers from clubs around the world being eligible; additionally, coaches and captains of national teams were also given the right to vote, before reverting to just journalists in 2016.

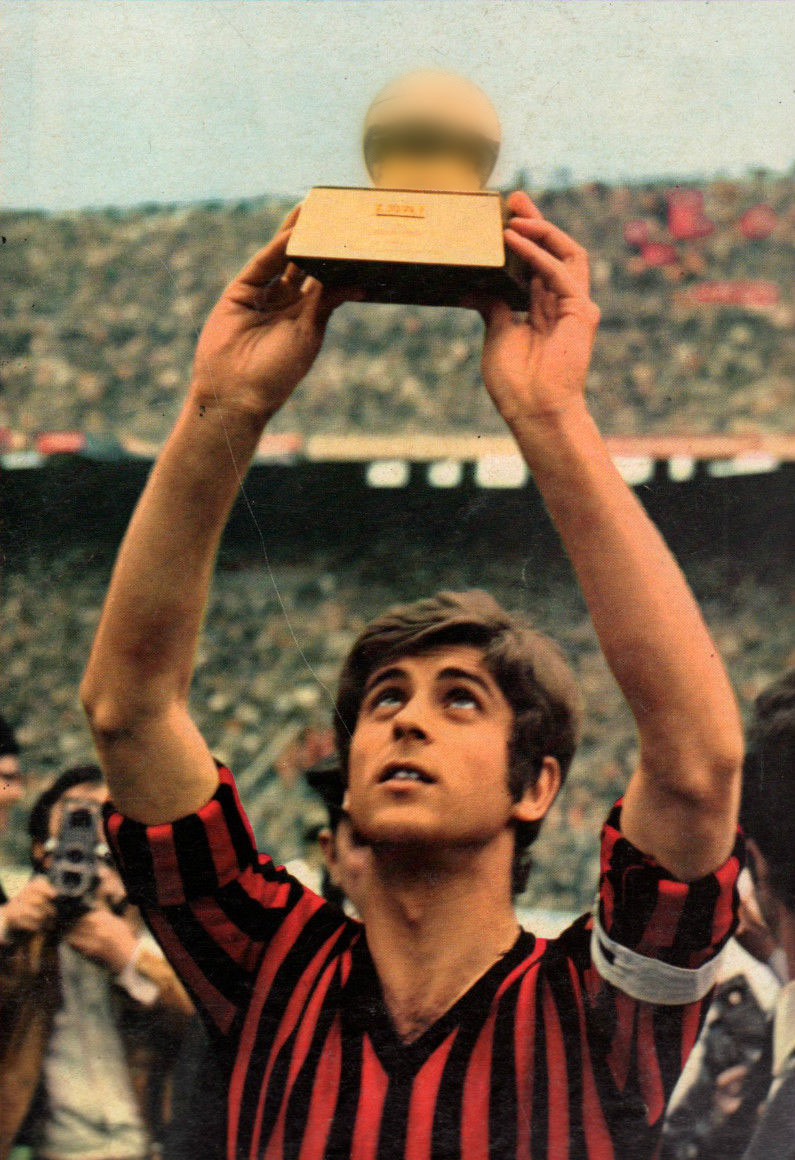
Gianni Rivera hoisting the 1969 Ballon d'Or.

Lionel Messi holds the record for most Ballon d'Or wins with eight, while five-time winner Cristiano Ronaldo earned the most nominations with eighteen. Messi is the only player to win the award with three clubs and also the only one to win it while playing outside Europe, as well as being the player with the most podiums, finishing in the top-three a record fourteen times, including eleven consecutive from 2007 to 2017. Three players have won the award three times each: Johan Cruyff, Michel Platini and Marco van Basten. With seven awards each, Dutch, German, and Portuguese players have won the second most Ballons d'Or, underneath Argentina and France in first with eight.

Players from West Germany (1972, 1981) and the Netherlands (1988) occupied the top-three spots in a single year. West German (1972) and Italian (1988–1990) clubs achieved the same feat, including two individual years dominated by Milan players (1988, 1989), a unique record until Spanish clubs experienced an unprecedented dominance (2009–2012, 2015, 2016) and Barcelona (2010) became the second club to occupy the top-three. The award shows a bias in favour of attacking players, and, over time, it has gone to a more exclusive set of leagues and clubs. Prior to 1995, ten leagues supplied Ballon d'Or winners, whereas only England, France, Germany, Italy, Spain and the United States have supplied winners since then. Spain's La Liga has the most Ballon d'Or winners overall, with twenty-four wins shared between Barcelona and Real Madrid; with twelve wins each, the two Spanish clubs also lead the overall club ranking for producing the most winners.

Between 2010 and 2015 inclusive, the award was merged with a similar one, the FIFA World Player of the Year award, to create the FIFA Ballon d'Or, which was awarded to the world's best male player before FIFA and France Football decided not to continue the merging agreement. The recipients of the joint FIFA Ballon d'Or are considered as winners by both award organizations. In 2020, Groupe Amaury, to which France Football belongs, decided that no award would be given for the year due to the impact of the COVID-19 pandemic on association football. It has been argued that the 2020 Ballon d'Or would likely have been awarded to Robert Lewandowski.

France Football modified the rules for the Ballon d'Or in 2022. They changed the timing so that awards were given not for achievements during a calendar year, but for a football season. It was also decided that an international jury of specialized journalists, with one representative per country, from the top 100 in the latest FIFA Men's World Ranking would determine the winner of the award; the plebiscite had previously been open to all countries since 2007. UEFA co-organizes the Ballon d'Or gala, a role it has held since 2024, with France Football retaining the voting system and the Ballon d'Or name.

=== Criteria ===
The Ballon d'Or is awarded based on three main criteria:

1) Individual performances, decisive and impressive character;
2) Team performances and achievements;
3) Class and fair play.

Nevertheless, critics have occasionally described the award as a "popularity contest", criticizing its voting process, its bias in favour of attacking players, and the idea of systematically singling out an individual in a team sport.

== Winners ==
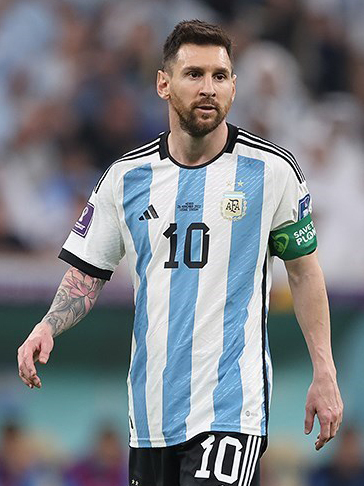
Lionel Messi has won a record eight Ballons d'Or across three different decades, and holds the record for most consecutive wins, with four between 2009 and 2012.

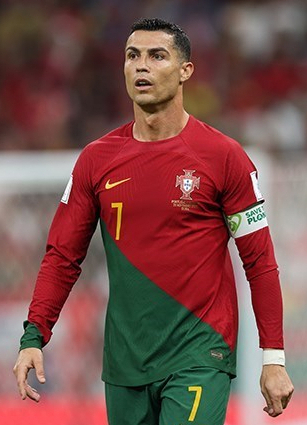
Cristiano Ronaldo has been nominated for the Ballon d'Or a record eighteen times and is a five-time winner.

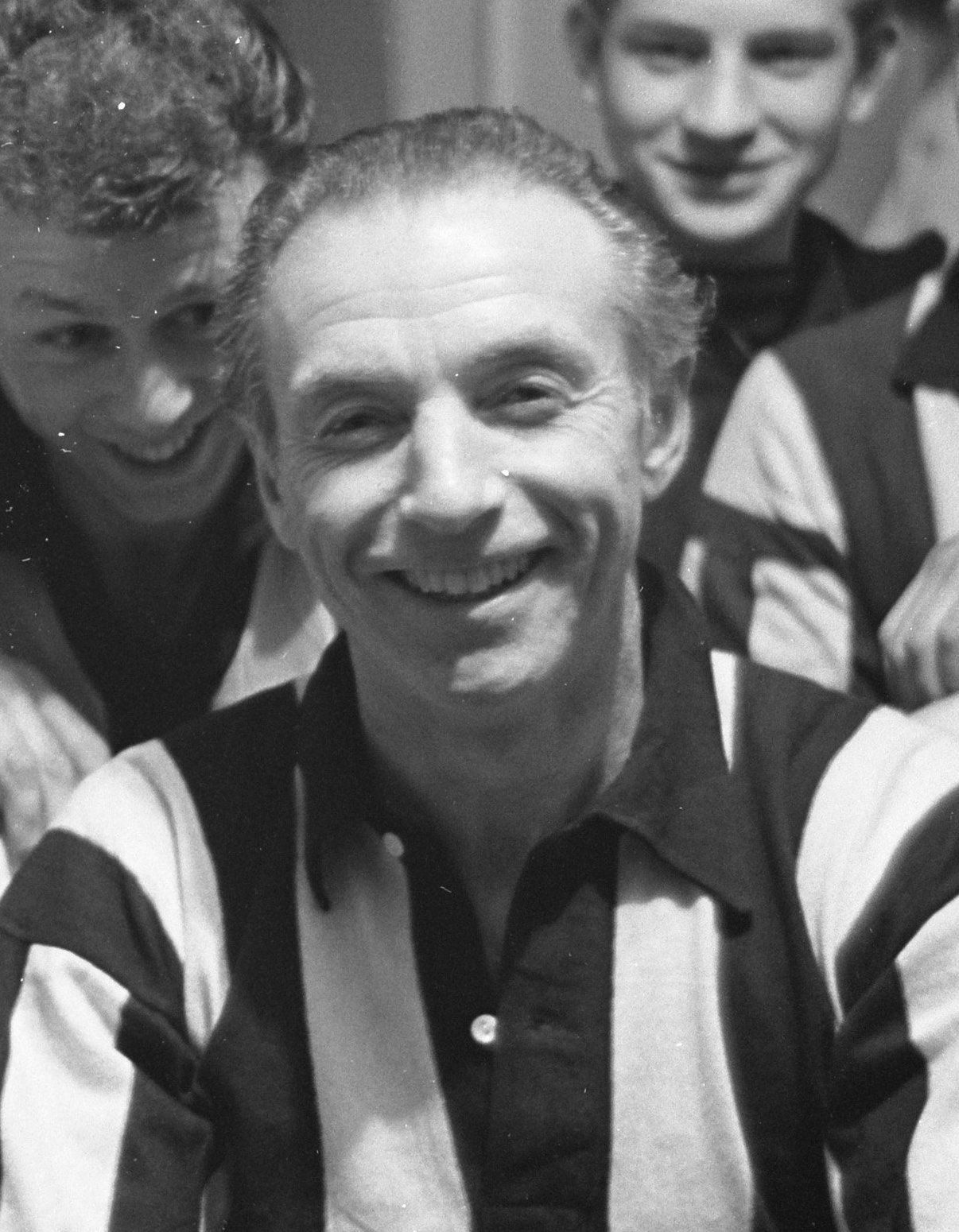
Stanley Matthews was the inaugural recipient and remains the oldest winner of the award, aged 41 years, 321 days.

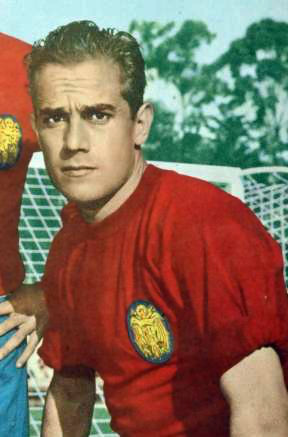
Luis Suárez was the first midfielder to win the award.

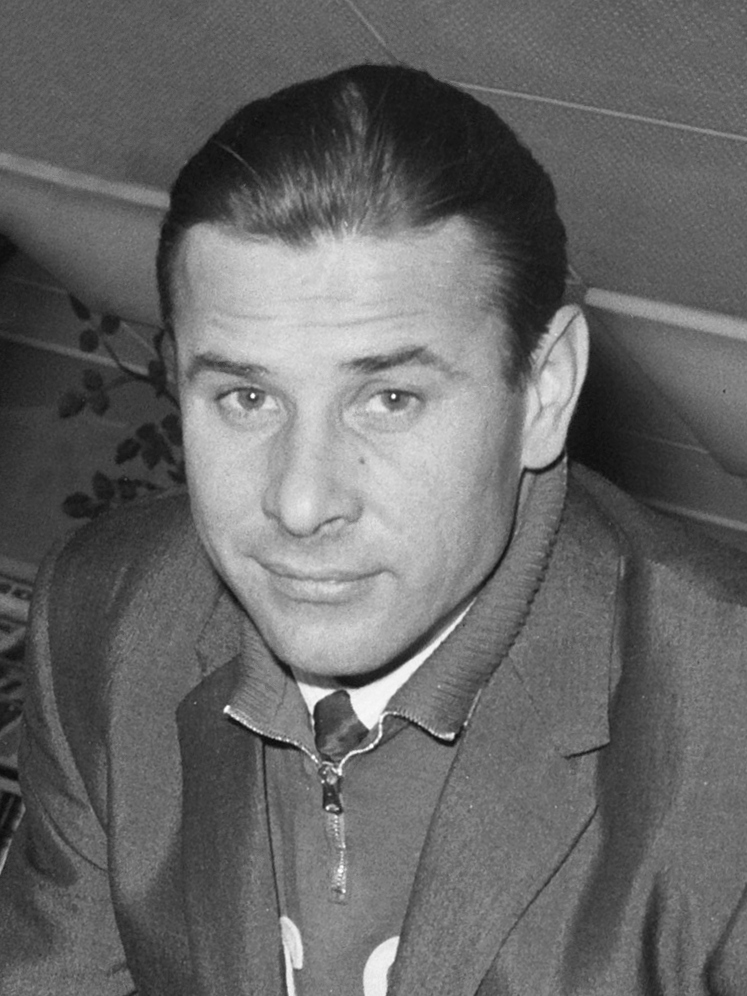
Lev Yashin is the only goalkeeper to have won the award.

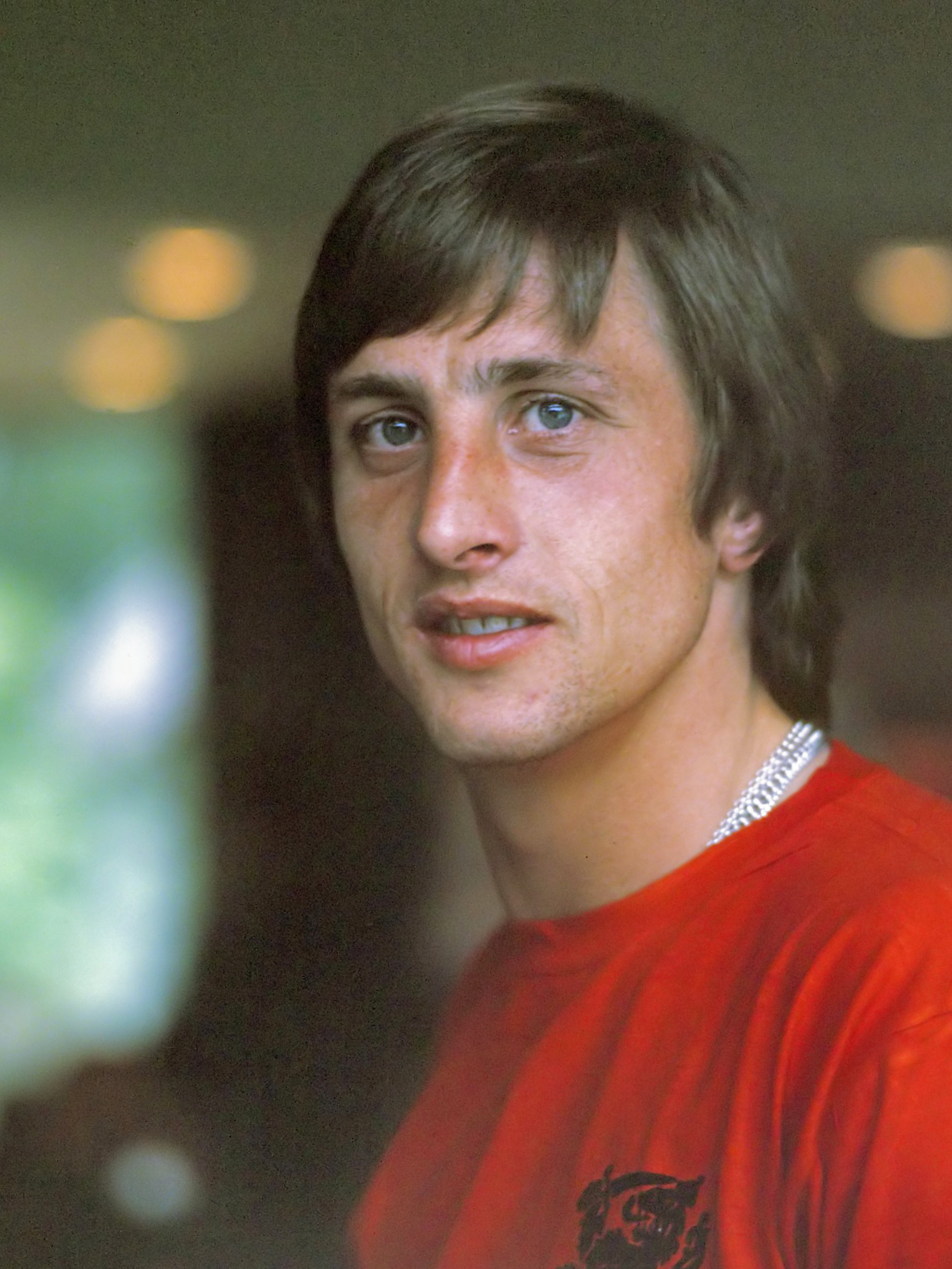
Johan Cruyff was the first player to win the award three times.

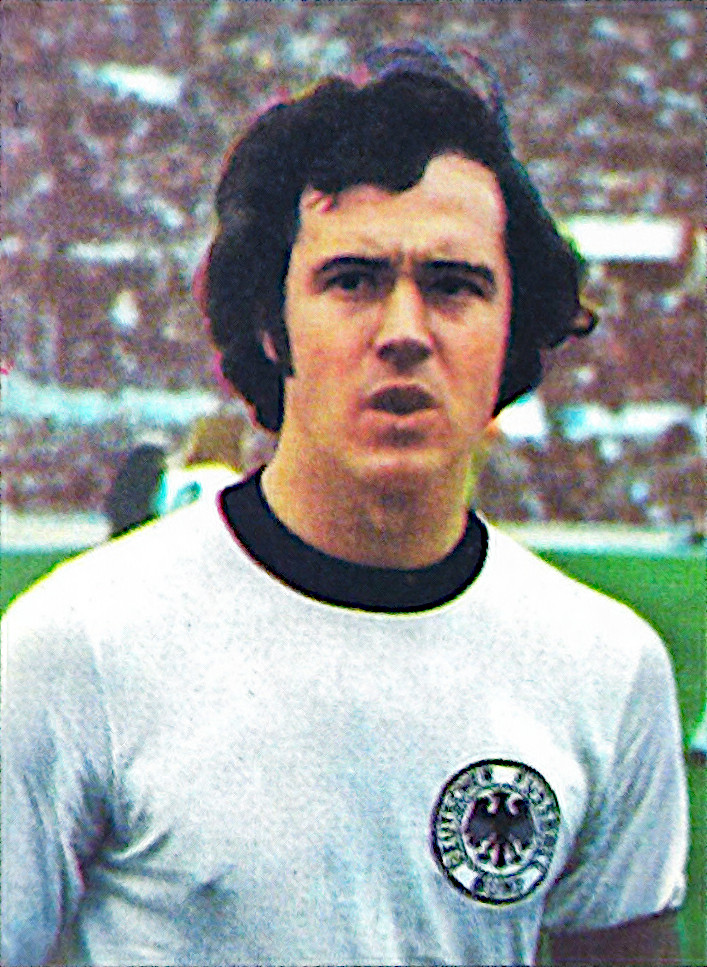
Franz Beckenbauer is the only defender to have won the award twice.

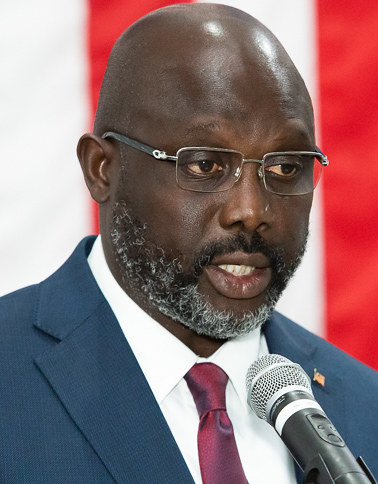
George Weah—the only African recipient—was the first non-European to win the award.

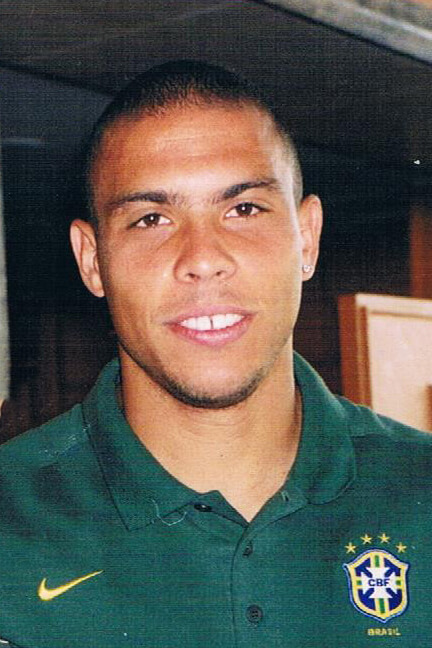
Two-time winner Ronaldo was the first South American to win the award and remains the youngest recipient, aged 21 years, 96 days.

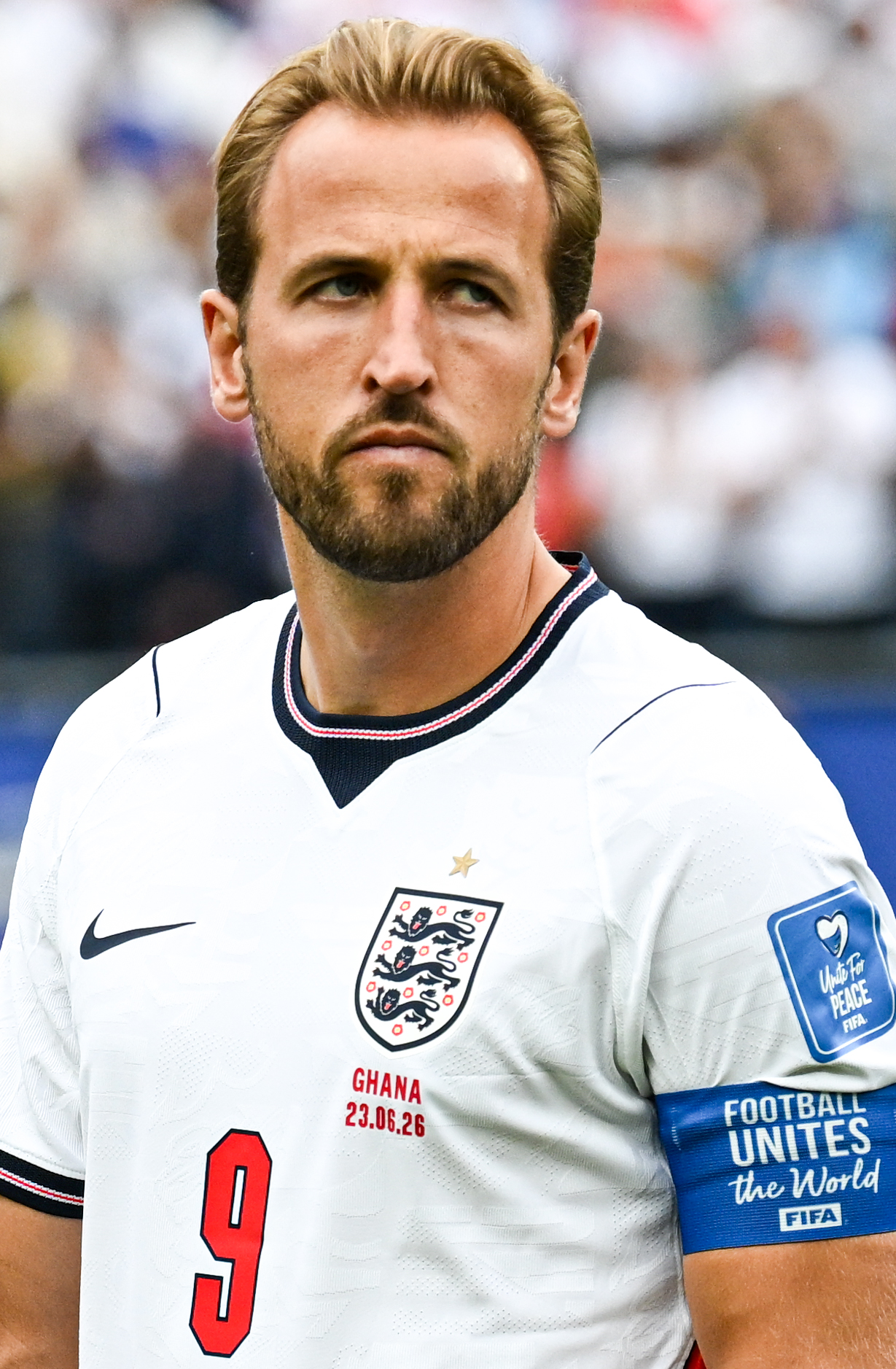
Harry Kane is the current award holder.

Note: Until 2021, the Ballon d'Or was awarded based on player performance during the calendar year. Since 2022, jurors have been instructed to take into account the previous season.

†	Denotes the player who set or tied the all-time record for the most Ballon d'Or wins at the time.
Player (X)	Denotes the number of times the player had won the award at that time (for players with multiple wins).

Ballon d'Or winners (Note: Attributed to multiple sources:)
Year	Rank	Player	Team	Points
Ballon d'Or (1956–2009)
1956	1st	(England) Stanley Matthews†	(England) Blackpool	47
1956	2nd	(Spain) Alfredo Di Stéfano (Note: Born in Argentina, Di Stéfano acquired Spanish citizenship in 1956, thus becoming eligible for the award.)	(Spain) Real Madrid	44
1956	3rd	(France) Raymond Kopa	(Spain) Real Madrid (Note: Kopa was signed by Real Madrid from Reims during 1956.)	33
1957	1st	(Spain) Alfredo Di Stéfano† (1)	(Spain) Real Madrid	72
1957	2nd	(England) Billy Wright	(England) Wolverhampton Wanderers	19
1957	3rd	(England) Duncan Edwards	(England) Manchester United	16
1957	3rd	(France) Raymond Kopa	(Spain) Real Madrid	16
1958	1st	(France) Raymond Kopa†	(Spain) Real Madrid	71
1958	2nd	(West Germany) Helmut Rahn	(West Germany) Rot-Weiss Essen	40
1958	3rd	(France) Just Fontaine	(France) Reims	23
1959	1st	(Spain) Alfredo Di Stéfano† (2)	(Spain) Real Madrid	80
1959	2nd	(France) Raymond Kopa	(France) Reims (Note: Kopa was signed by Reims from Real Madrid during 1959.)	42
1959	3rd	(Wales) John Charles	(Italy) Juventus	24
1960	1st	(Spain) Luis Suárez	(Spain) Barcelona	54
1960	2nd	(Hungary) Ferenc Puskás	(Spain) Real Madrid	37
1960	3rd	(West Germany) Uwe Seeler	(West Germany) Hamburger SV	33
1961	1st	(Italy) Omar Sívori (Note: Born in Argentina, Sívori acquired Italian citizenship in 1961, thus becoming eligible for the award.)	(Italy) Juventus	46
1961	2nd	(Spain) Luis Suárez	(Italy) Inter Milan (Note: Suárez was signed by Inter Milan from Barcelona during 1961.)	40
1961	3rd	(England) Johnny Haynes	(England) Fulham	22
1962	1st	(Czechoslovakia) Josef Masopust	(Czechoslovakia) Dukla Prague	65
1962	2nd	(Portugal) Eusébio	(Portugal) Benfica	53
1962	3rd	(West Germany) Karl-Heinz Schnellinger	(West Germany) 1. FC Köln	33
1963	1st	(Soviet Union) Lev Yashin	(Soviet Union) Dynamo Moscow	73
1963	2nd	(Italy) Gianni Rivera	(Italy) Milan	55
1963	3rd	(England) Jimmy Greaves	(England) Tottenham Hotspur	50
1964	1st	(Scotland) Denis Law	(England) Manchester United	61
1964	2nd	(Spain) Luis Suárez	(Italy) Inter Milan	43
1964	3rd	(Spain) Amancio	(Spain) Real Madrid	38
1965	1st	(Portugal) Eusébio	(Portugal) Benfica	67
1965	2nd	(Italy) Giacinto Facchetti	(Italy) Inter Milan	59
1965	3rd	(Spain) Luis Suárez	(Italy) Inter Milan	45
1966	1st	(England) Bobby Charlton	(England) Manchester United	81
1966	2nd	(Portugal) Eusébio	(Portugal) Benfica	80
1966	3rd	(West Germany) Franz Beckenbauer	(West Germany) Bayern Munich	59
1967	1st	(Hungary) Flórián Albert	(Hungary) Ferencváros	68
1967	2nd	(England) Bobby Charlton	(England) Manchester United	40
1967	3rd	(Scotland) Jimmy Johnstone	(Scotland) Celtic	39
1968	1st	(Northern Ireland) George Best	(England) Manchester United	61
1968	2nd	(England) Bobby Charlton	(England) Manchester United	53
1968	3rd	(Socialist Federal Republic of Yugoslavia) Dragan Džajić	(Socialist Federal Republic of Yugoslavia) Red Star Belgrade	46
1969	1st	(Italy) Gianni Rivera	(Italy) Milan	83
1969	2nd	(Italy) Gigi Riva	(Italy) Cagliari	79
1969	3rd	(West Germany) Gerd Müller	(West Germany) Bayern Munich	38
1970	1st	(West Germany) Gerd Müller	(West Germany) Bayern Munich	77
1970	2nd	(England) Bobby Moore	(England) West Ham United	70
1970	3rd	(Italy) Gigi Riva	(Italy) Cagliari	65
1971	1st	(Netherlands) Johan Cruyff (1)	(Netherlands) Ajax	116
1971	2nd	(Italy) Sandro Mazzola	(Italy) Inter Milan	57
1971	3rd	(Northern Ireland) George Best	(England) Manchester United	56
1972	1st	(West Germany) Franz Beckenbauer (1)	(West Germany) Bayern Munich	81
1972	2nd	(West Germany) Gerd Müller	(West Germany) Bayern Munich	79
1972	2nd	(West Germany) Günter Netzer	(West Germany) Borussia Mönchengladbach	79
1973	1st	(Netherlands) Johan Cruyff† (2)	(Spain) Barcelona (Note: Cruyff was signed by Barcelona from Ajax during 1973.)	96
1973	2nd	(Italy) Dino Zoff	(Italy) Juventus	47
1973	3rd	(West Germany) Gerd Müller	(West Germany) Bayern Munich	44
1974	1st	(Netherlands) Johan Cruyff† (3)	(Spain) Barcelona	116
1974	2nd	(West Germany) Franz Beckenbauer	(West Germany) Bayern Munich	105
1974	3rd	(Poland) Kazimierz Deyna	(Poland) Legia Warsaw	35
1975	1st	(Soviet Union) Oleg Blokhin	(Soviet Union) Dynamo Kyiv	122
1975	2nd	(West Germany) Franz Beckenbauer	(West Germany) Bayern Munich	42
1975	3rd	(Netherlands) Johan Cruyff	(Spain) Barcelona	27
1976	1st	(West Germany) Franz Beckenbauer (2)	(West Germany) Bayern Munich	91
1976	2nd	(Netherlands) Rob Rensenbrink	(Belgium) Anderlecht	75
1976	3rd	(Czechoslovakia) Ivo Viktor	(Czechoslovakia) Dukla Prague	52
1977	1st	(Denmark) Allan Simonsen	(West Germany) Borussia Mönchengladbach	74
1977	2nd	(England) Kevin Keegan	(West Germany) Hamburger SV (Note: Keegan was signed by Hamburger SV from Liverpool during 1977.)	71
1977	3rd	(France) Michel Platini	(France) Nancy	70
1978	1st	(England) Kevin Keegan (1)	(West Germany) Hamburger SV	87
1978	2nd	(Austria) Hans Krankl	(Spain) Barcelona (Note: Krankl was signed by Barcelona from Rapid Wien during 1978.)	81
1978	3rd	(Netherlands) Rob Rensenbrink	(Belgium) Anderlecht	50
1979	1st	(England) Kevin Keegan (2)	(West Germany) Hamburger SV	118
1979	2nd	(West Germany) Karl-Heinz Rummenigge	(West Germany) Bayern Munich	52
1979	3rd	(Netherlands) Ruud Krol	(Netherlands) Ajax	41
1980	1st	(West Germany) Karl-Heinz Rummenigge (1)	(West Germany) Bayern Munich	122
1980	2nd	(West Germany) Bernd Schuster	(Spain) Barcelona (Note: Schuster was signed by Barcelona from 1. FC Köln during 1980.)	34
1980	3rd	(France) Michel Platini	(France) Saint-Étienne	33
1981	1st	(West Germany) Karl-Heinz Rummenigge (2)	(West Germany) Bayern Munich	106
1981	2nd	(West Germany) Paul Breitner	(West Germany) Bayern Munich	64
1981	3rd	(West Germany) Bernd Schuster	(Spain) Barcelona	39
1982	1st	(Italy) Paolo Rossi	(Italy) Juventus	115
1982	2nd	(France) Alain Giresse	(France) Bordeaux	64
1982	3rd	(Poland) Zbigniew Boniek	(Italy) Juventus (Note: Boniek was signed by Juventus from Widzew Łódź during 1982.)	39
1983	1st	(France) Michel Platini (1)	(Italy) Juventus	110
1983	2nd	(Scotland) Kenny Dalglish	(England) Liverpool	26
1983	3rd	(Denmark) Allan Simonsen	(Denmark) Vejle (Note: Simonsen was signed by Vejle from Charlton Athletic during 1983.)	25
1984	1st	(France) Michel Platini (2)	(Italy) Juventus	110
1984	2nd	(France) Jean Tigana	(France) Bordeaux	57
1984	3rd	(Denmark) Preben Elkjær	(Italy) Hellas Verona (Note: Elkjær was signed by Hellas Verona from Lokeren during 1984.)	48
1985	1st	(France) Michel Platini† (3)	(Italy) Juventus	127
1985	2nd	(Denmark) Preben Elkjær	(Italy) Hellas Verona	71
1985	3rd	(West Germany) Bernd Schuster	(Spain) Barcelona	46
1986	1st	(Soviet Union) Igor Belanov	(Soviet Union) Dynamo Kyiv	84
1986	2nd	(England) Gary Lineker	(Spain) Barcelona (Note: Lineker was signed by Barcelona from Everton during 1986.)	62
1986	3rd	(Spain) Emilio Butragueño	(Spain) Real Madrid	59
1987	1st	(Netherlands) Ruud Gullit	(Italy) Milan (Note: Gullit was signed by AC Milan from PSV Eindhoven during 1987.)	106
1987	2nd	(Portugal) Paulo Futre	(Spain) Atlético Madrid (Note: Futre was signed by Atlético Madrid from Porto during 1987.)	91
1987	3rd	(Spain) Emilio Butragueño	(Spain) Real Madrid	61
1988	1st	(Netherlands) Marco van Basten (1)	(Italy) Milan	129
1988	2nd	(Netherlands) Ruud Gullit	(Italy) Milan	88
1988	3rd	(Netherlands) Frank Rijkaard	(Italy) Milan (Note: Rijkaard was signed by AC Milan from Zaragoza during 1988.)	45
1989	1st	(Netherlands) Marco van Basten (2)	(Italy) Milan	129
1989	2nd	(Italy) Franco Baresi	(Italy) Milan	80
1989	3rd	(Netherlands) Frank Rijkaard	(Italy) Milan	43
1990	1st	(Germany) Lothar Matthäus	(Italy) Inter Milan	137
1990	2nd	(Italy) Salvatore Schillaci	(Italy) Juventus	84
1990	3rd	(Germany) Andreas Brehme	(Italy) Inter Milan	68
1991	1st	(France) Jean-Pierre Papin	(France) Marseille	141
1991	2nd	(Socialist Federal Republic of Yugoslavia) Dejan Savićević	(Socialist Federal Republic of Yugoslavia) Red Star Belgrade	42
1991	2nd	(Socialist Federal Republic of Yugoslavia) Darko Pančev	(Socialist Federal Republic of Yugoslavia) Red Star Belgrade	42
1991	2nd	(Germany) Lothar Matthäus	(Italy) Inter Milan	42
1992	1st	(Netherlands) Marco van Basten† (3)	(Italy) Milan	98
1992	2nd	(Bulgaria) Hristo Stoichkov	(Spain) Barcelona	80
1992	3rd	(Netherlands) Dennis Bergkamp	(Netherlands) Ajax	53
1993	1st	(Italy) Roberto Baggio	(Italy) Juventus	142
1993	2nd	(Netherlands) Dennis Bergkamp	(Italy) Inter Milan (Note: Bergkamp was signed by Inter Milan from Ajax during 1993.)	83
1993	3rd	(France) Eric Cantona	(England) Manchester United	34
1994	1st	(Bulgaria) Hristo Stoichkov	(Spain) Barcelona	210
1994	2nd	(Italy) Roberto Baggio	(Italy) Juventus	136
1994	3rd	(Italy) Paolo Maldini	(Italy) Milan	109
1995	1st	(Liberia) George Weah	(Italy) Milan (Note: Weah was signed by AC Milan from Paris Saint-Germain during 1995.)	144
1995	2nd	(Germany) Jürgen Klinsmann	(Germany) Bayern Munich (Note: Klinsmann was signed by Bayern Munich from Tottenham Hotspur during 1995.)	108
1995	3rd	(Finland) Jari Litmanen	(Netherlands) Ajax	67
1996	1st	(Germany) Matthias Sammer	(Germany) Borussia Dortmund	144
1996	2nd	(Brazil) Ronaldo	(Spain) Barcelona (Note: Ronaldo was signed by Barcelona from PSV Eindhoven during 1996.)	143
1996	3rd	(England) Alan Shearer	(England) Newcastle United (Note: Shearer was signed by Newcastle United from Blackburn Rovers during 1996.)	107
1997	1st	(Brazil) Ronaldo (1)	(Italy) Inter Milan (Note: Ronaldo was signed by Inter Milan from Barcelona during 1997.)	222
1997	2nd	(Federal Republic of Yugoslavia) Predrag Mijatović	(Spain) Real Madrid	68
1997	3rd	(France) Zinedine Zidane	(Italy) Juventus	63
1998	1st	(France) Zinedine Zidane	(Italy) Juventus	244
1998	2nd	(Croatia) Davor Šuker	(Spain) Real Madrid	68
1998	3rd	(Brazil) Ronaldo	(Italy) Inter Milan	66
1999	1st	(Brazil) Rivaldo	(Spain) Barcelona	219
1999	2nd	(England) David Beckham	(England) Manchester United	154
1999	3rd	(Ukraine) Andriy Shevchenko	(Italy) Milan (Note: Shevchenko was signed by AC Milan from Dynamo Kyiv during 1999.)	64
2000	1st	(Portugal) Luís Figo	(Spain) Real Madrid (Note: Figo was signed by Real Madrid from Barcelona during 2000.)	197
2000	2nd	(France) Zinedine Zidane	(Italy) Juventus	181
2000	3rd	(Ukraine) Andriy Shevchenko	(Italy) Milan	85
2001	1st	(England) Michael Owen	(England) Liverpool	176
2001	2nd	(Spain) Raúl	(Spain) Real Madrid	140
2001	3rd	(Germany) Oliver Kahn	(Germany) Bayern Munich	114
2002	1st	(Brazil) Ronaldo (2)	(Spain) Real Madrid (Note: Ronaldo was signed by Real Madrid from Inter Milan during 2002.)	169
2002	2nd	(Brazil) Roberto Carlos	(Spain) Real Madrid	145
2002	3rd	(Germany) Oliver Kahn	(Germany) Bayern Munich	110
2003	1st	(Czech Republic) Pavel Nedvěd	(Italy) Juventus	190
2003	2nd	(France) Thierry Henry	(England) Arsenal	128
2003	3rd	(Italy) Paolo Maldini	(Italy) Milan	123
2004	1st	(Ukraine) Andriy Shevchenko	(Italy) Milan	175
2004	2nd	(Portugal) Deco	(Spain) Barcelona (Note: Deco was signed by Barcelona from Porto during 2004.)	139
2004	3rd	(Brazil) Ronaldinho	(Spain) Barcelona	133
2005	1st	(Brazil) Ronaldinho	(Spain) Barcelona	225
2005	2nd	(England) Frank Lampard	(England) Chelsea	148
2005	3rd	(England) Steven Gerrard	(England) Liverpool	142
2006	1st	(Italy) Fabio Cannavaro	(Spain) Real Madrid (Note: Cannavaro was signed by Real Madrid from Juventus during 2006.)	173
2006	2nd	(Italy) Gianluigi Buffon	(Italy) Juventus	124
2006	3rd	(France) Thierry Henry	(England) Arsenal	121
2007	1st	(Brazil) Kaká	(Italy) Milan	444
2007	2nd	(Portugal) Cristiano Ronaldo	(England) Manchester United	277
2007	3rd	(Argentina) Lionel Messi	(Spain) Barcelona	255
2008	1st	(Portugal) Cristiano Ronaldo (1)	(England) Manchester United	446
2008	2nd	(Argentina) Lionel Messi	(Spain) Barcelona	281
2008	3rd	(Spain) Fernando Torres	(England) Liverpool	179
2009	1st	(Argentina) Lionel Messi (1)	(Spain) Barcelona	473
2009	2nd	(Portugal) Cristiano Ronaldo	(Spain) Real Madrid (Note: Cristiano Ronaldo was signed by Real Madrid from Manchester United during 2009.)	233
2009	3rd	(Spain) Xavi	(Spain) Barcelona	170
FIFA Ballon d'Or (2010–2015)
2010	1st	(Argentina) Lionel Messi (2)	(Spain) Barcelona	22.65%
2010	2nd	(Spain) Andrés Iniesta	(Spain) Barcelona	17.36%
2010	3rd	(Spain) Xavi	(Spain) Barcelona	16.48%
2011	1st	(Argentina) Lionel Messi† (3)	(Spain) Barcelona	47.88%
2011	2nd	(Portugal) Cristiano Ronaldo	(Spain) Real Madrid	21.60%
2011	3rd	(Spain) Xavi	(Spain) Barcelona	9.23%
2012	1st	(Argentina) Lionel Messi† (4)	(Spain) Barcelona	41.60%
2012	2nd	(Portugal) Cristiano Ronaldo	(Spain) Real Madrid	23.68%
2012	3rd	(Spain) Andrés Iniesta	(Spain) Barcelona	10.91%
2013	1st	(Portugal) Cristiano Ronaldo (2)	(Spain) Real Madrid	27.99%
2013	2nd	(Argentina) Lionel Messi	(Spain) Barcelona	24.72%
2013	3rd	(France) Franck Ribéry	(Germany) Bayern Munich	23.36%
2014	1st	(Portugal) Cristiano Ronaldo (3)	(Spain) Real Madrid	37.66%
2014	2nd	(Argentina) Lionel Messi	(Spain) Barcelona	15.76%
2014	3rd	(Germany) Manuel Neuer	(Germany) Bayern Munich	15.72%
2015	1st	(Argentina) Lionel Messi† (5)	(Spain) Barcelona	41.33%
2015	2nd	(Portugal) Cristiano Ronaldo	(Spain) Real Madrid	27.76%
2015	3rd	(Brazil) Neymar	(Spain) Barcelona	7.86%
Ballon d'Or (2016–present)
2016	1st	(Portugal) Cristiano Ronaldo (4)	(Spain) Real Madrid	745
2016	2nd	(Argentina) Lionel Messi	(Spain) Barcelona	316
2016	3rd	(France) Antoine Griezmann	(Spain) Atlético Madrid	198
2017	1st	(Portugal) Cristiano Ronaldo† (5)	(Spain) Real Madrid	946
2017	2nd	(Argentina) Lionel Messi	(Spain) Barcelona	670
2017	3rd	(Brazil) Neymar	(France) Paris Saint-Germain (Note: Neymar was signed by Paris Saint-Germain from Barcelona during 2017.)	361
2018	1st	(Croatia) Luka Modrić	(Spain) Real Madrid	753
2018	2nd	(Portugal) Cristiano Ronaldo	(Italy) Juventus (Note: Cristiano Ronaldo was signed by Juventus from Real Madrid during 2018.)	476
2018	3rd	(France) Antoine Griezmann	(Spain) Atlético Madrid	414
2019	1st	(Argentina) Lionel Messi† (6)	(Spain) Barcelona	686
2019	2nd	(Netherlands) Virgil van Dijk	(England) Liverpool	679
2019	3rd	(Portugal) Cristiano Ronaldo	(Italy) Juventus	476
2020	Not awarded due to the COVID-19 pandemic			
2021	1st	(Argentina) Lionel Messi† (7)	(France) Paris Saint-Germain (Note: Messi was signed by Paris Saint-Germain from Barcelona during 2021.)	613
2021	2nd	(Poland) Robert Lewandowski	(Germany) Bayern Munich	580
2021	3rd	(Italy) Jorginho	(England) Chelsea	460
2022	1st	(France) Karim Benzema	(Spain) Real Madrid	549
2022	2nd	(Senegal) Sadio Mané	(Germany) Bayern Munich (Note: Mané was signed by Bayern Munich from Liverpool during 2022.)	193
2022	3rd	(Belgium) Kevin De Bruyne	(England) Manchester City	175
2023	1st	(Argentina) Lionel Messi† (8)	(United States) Inter Miami (Note: Messi was signed by Inter Miami from Paris Saint-Germain during 2023.)	462
2023	2nd	(Norway) Erling Haaland	(England) Manchester City	357
2023	3rd	(France) Kylian Mbappé	(France) Paris Saint-Germain	270
2024	1st	(Spain) Rodri	(England) Manchester City	1170
2024	2nd	(Brazil) Vinícius Júnior	(Spain) Real Madrid	1129
2024	3rd	(England) Jude Bellingham	(Spain) Real Madrid	917
2025	1st	(France) Ousmane Dembélé	(France) Paris Saint-Germain	1380
2025	2nd	(Spain) Lamine Yamal	(Spain) Barcelona	1059
2025	3rd	(Portugal) Vitinha	(France) Paris Saint-Germain	703
2026	1st	(England) Harry Kane	(Germany) Bayern Munich	1055
2026	2nd	(France) Kylian Mbappé	(Spain) Real Madrid	1027
2026	3rd	(Spain) Lamine Yamal	(Spain) Barcelona	881

=== Wins by player ===
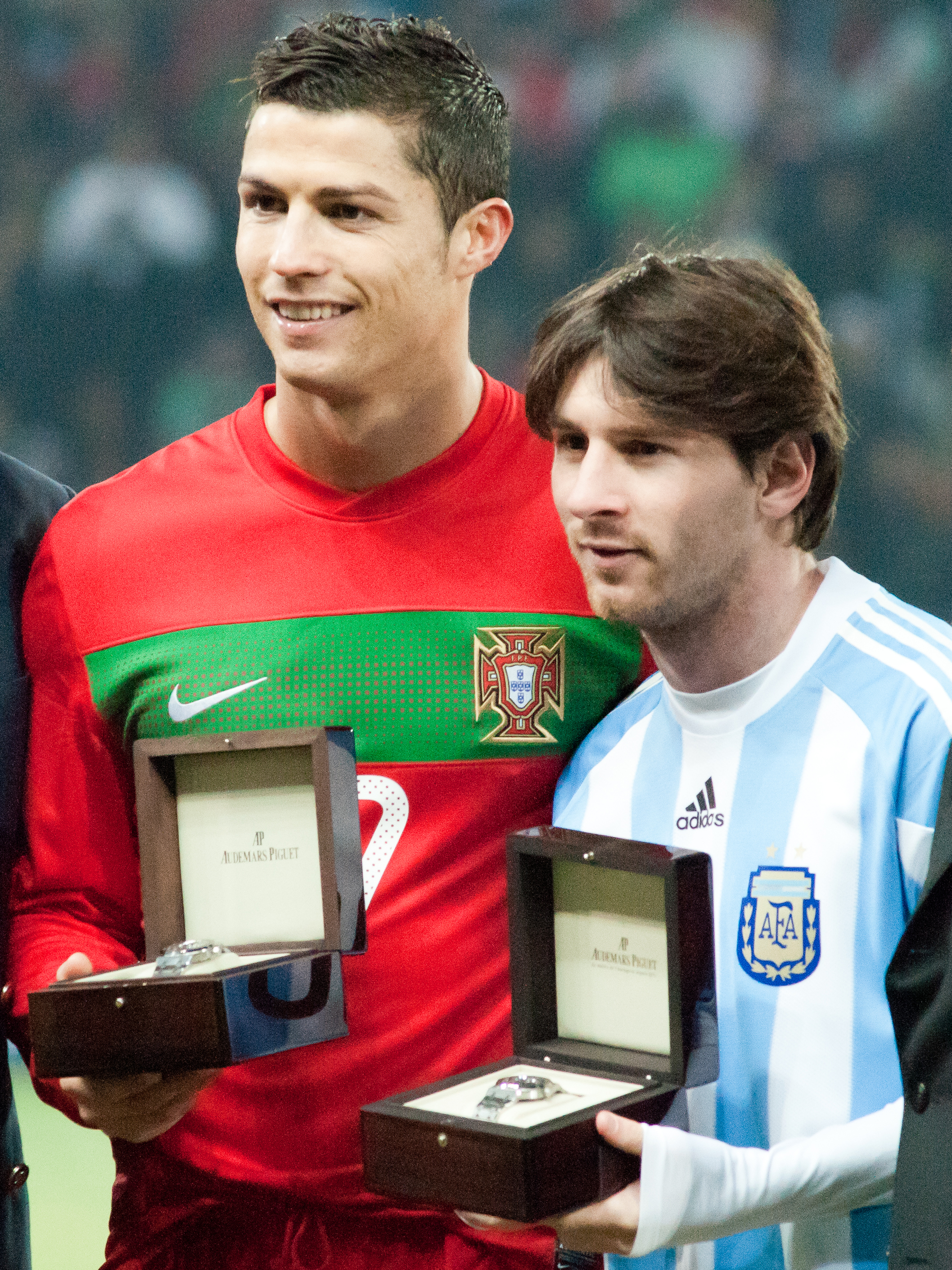
Cristiano Ronaldo (left) and Lionel Messi (right) won thirteen Ballon d'Or trophies between them from 2008 to 2023.

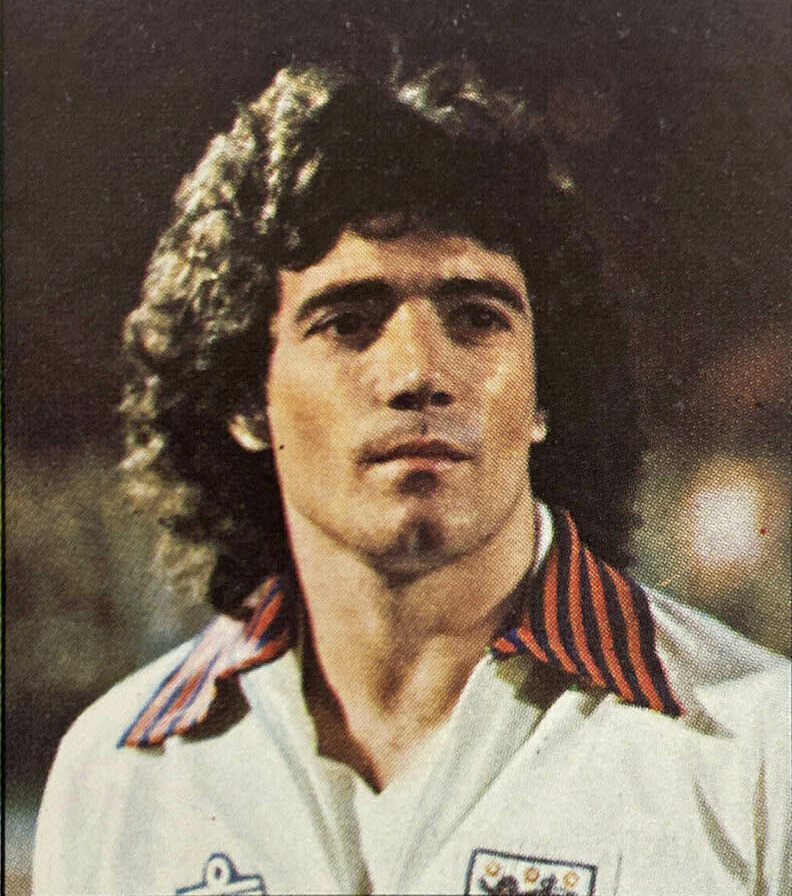
Kevin Keegan won the award back-to-back in 1978 and 1979.

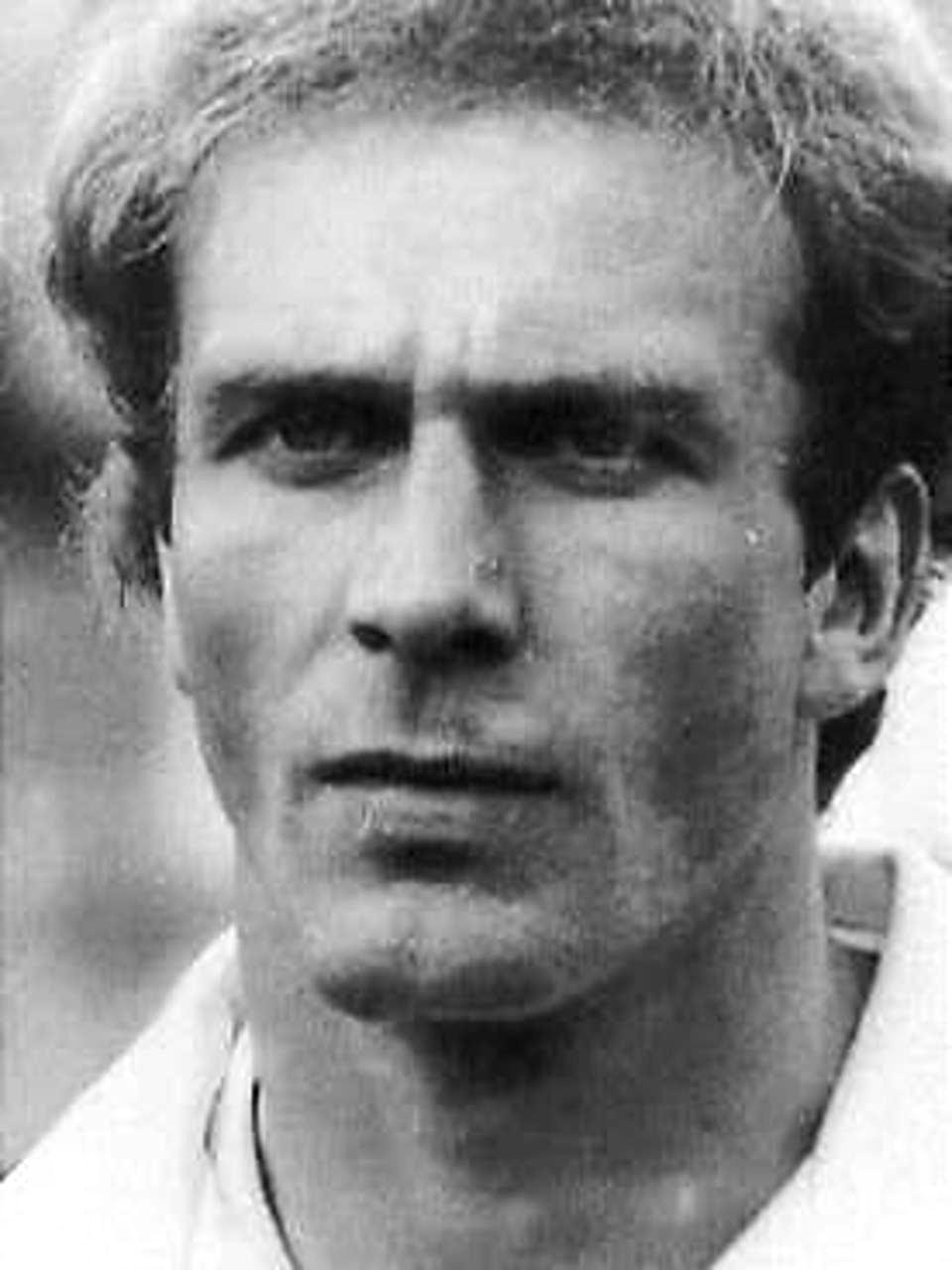
Karl-Heinz Rummenigge won the award back-to-back in 1980 and 1981.

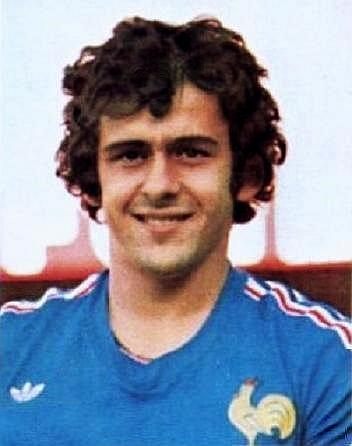
Michel Platini won the award three years running from 1983 to 1985.

Player	Winner	Second place	Third place
(Argentina) Lionel Messi	8 (2009, 2010, 2011, 2012, 2015, 2019, 2021, 2023)	5 (2008, 2013, 2014, 2016, 2017)	1 (2007)
(Portugal) Cristiano Ronaldo	5 (2008, 2013, 2014, 2016, 2017)	6 (2007, 2009, 2011, 2012, 2015, 2018)	1 (2019)
(France) Michel Platini	3 (1983, 1984, 1985)		2 (1977, 1980)
(Netherlands) Johan Cruyff	3 (1971, 1973, 1974)		1 (1975)
(Netherlands) Marco van Basten	3 (1988, 1989, 1992)		
(West Germany) Franz Beckenbauer	2 (1972, 1976)	2 (1974, 1975)	1 (1966)
(Brazil) Ronaldo	2 (1997, 2002)	1 (1996)	1 (1998)
(Spain) Alfredo Di Stéfano	2 (1957, 1959)	1 (1956)	
(England) Kevin Keegan	2 (1978, 1979)	1 (1977)	
(West Germany) Karl-Heinz Rummenigge	2 (1980, 1981)	1 (1979)	
(Spain) Luis Suárez	1 (1960)	2 (1961, 1964)	1 (1965)
(Portugal) Eusébio	1 (1965)	2 (1962, 1966)	
(England) Bobby Charlton	1 (1966)	2 (1967, 1968)	
(France) Raymond Kopa	1 (1958)	1 (1959)	2 (1956, 1957)
(West Germany) Gerd Müller	1 (1970)	1 (1972)	2 (1969, 1973)
(France) Zinedine Zidane	1 (1998)	1 (2000)	1 (1997)
(Italy) Gianni Rivera	1 (1969)	1 (1963)	
(Netherlands) Ruud Gullit	1 (1987)	1 (1988)	
(Germany) Lothar Matthäus	1 (1990)	1 (1991)	
(Italy) Roberto Baggio	1 (1993)	1 (1994)	
(Bulgaria) Hristo Stoichkov	1 (1994)	1 (1992)	
(Ukraine) Andriy Shevchenko	1 (2004)		2 (1999, 2000)
(Northern Ireland) George Best	1 (1968)		1 (1971)
(Denmark) Allan Simonsen	1 (1977)		1 (1983)
(Brazil) Ronaldinho	1 (2005)		1 (2004)
(England) Stanley Matthews	1 (1956)		
(Italy) Omar Sívori	1 (1961)		
(Czechoslovakia) Josef Masopust	1 (1962)		
(Soviet Union) Lev Yashin	1 (1963)		
(Scotland) Denis Law	1 (1964)		
(Hungary) Flórián Albert	1 (1967)		
(Soviet Union) Oleg Blokhin	1 (1975)		
(Italy) Paolo Rossi	1 (1982)		
(Soviet Union) Igor Belanov	1 (1986)		
(France) Jean-Pierre Papin	1 (1991)		
(Liberia) George Weah	1 (1995)		
(Germany) Matthias Sammer	1 (1996)		
(Brazil) Rivaldo	1 (1999)		
(Portugal) Luís Figo	1 (2000)		
(England) Michael Owen	1 (2001)		
(Czech Republic) Pavel Nedvěd	1 (2003)		
(Italy) Fabio Cannavaro	1 (2006)		
(Brazil) Kaká	1 (2007)		
(Croatia) Luka Modrić	1 (2018)		
(France) Karim Benzema	1 (2022)		
(Spain) Rodri	1 (2024)		
(France) Ousmane Dembélé	1 (2025)		
(England) Harry Kane	1 (2026)		

=== Wins by country ===
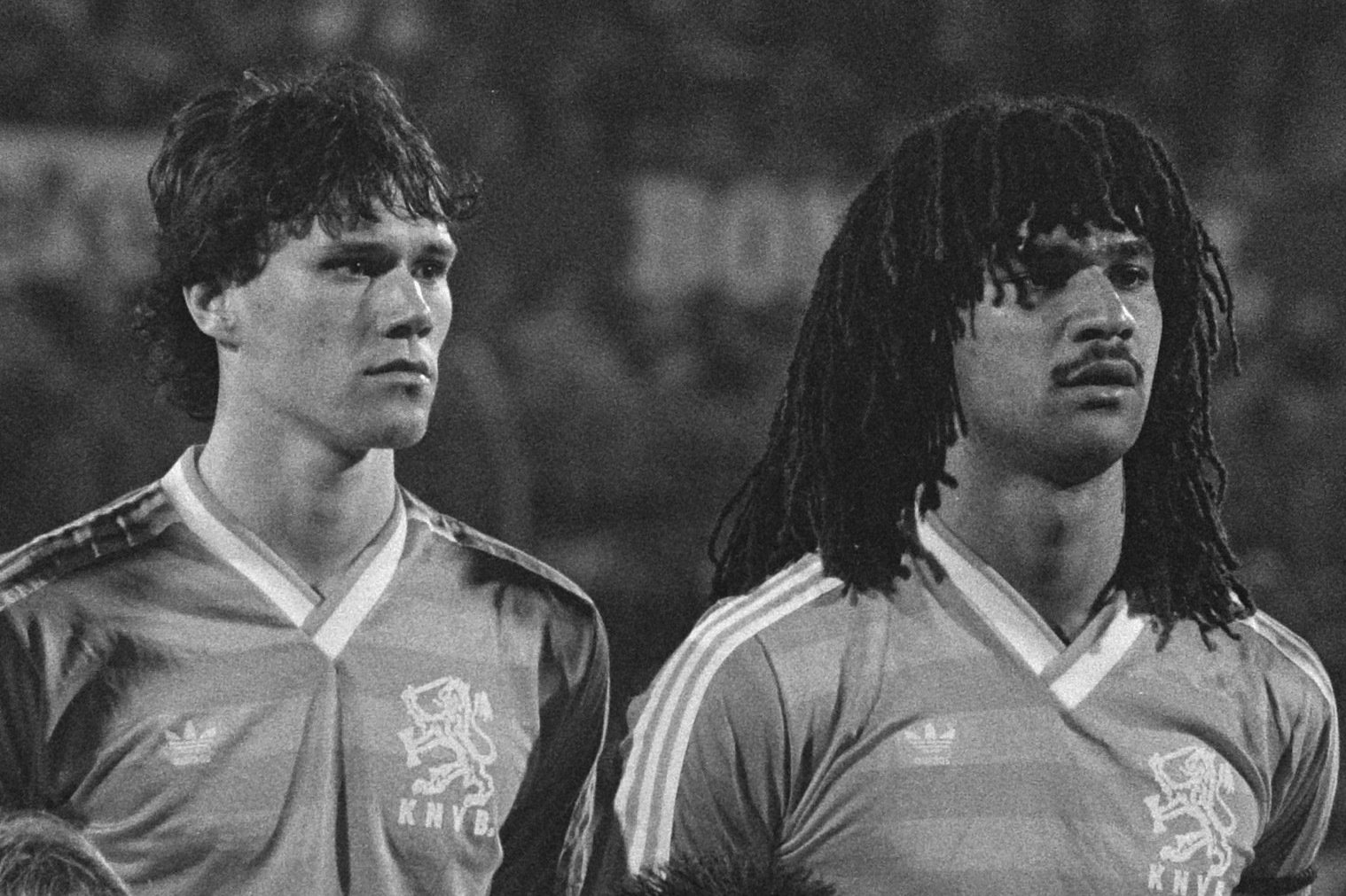
Marco van Basten (left) and Ruud Gullit (right), teammates for Milan and the Netherlands, won in consecutive years from 1987 to 1989.

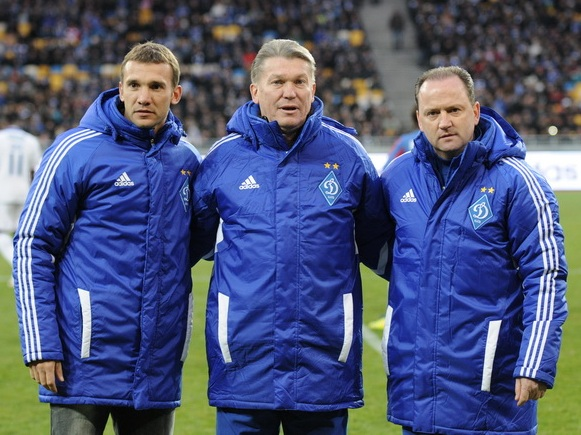
Ballon d'Or winners (left to right) Andriy Shevchenko of Ukraine, and Soviet-era winners Oleg Blokhin and Igor Belanov.

Country	Players	Wins
France	6	8
Argentina	1	8
Germany	5	7
Netherlands	3	7
Portugal	3	7
England	5	6
Italy	5	5
Brazil	4	5
Spain	3	4
Soviet Union	3	3
Bulgaria	1	1
Croatia	1	1
Czech Republic	1	1
Czechoslovakia	1	1
Denmark	1	1
Hungary	1	1
Liberia	1	1
Northern Ireland	1	1
Scotland	1	1
Ukraine	1	1

=== Wins by club ===
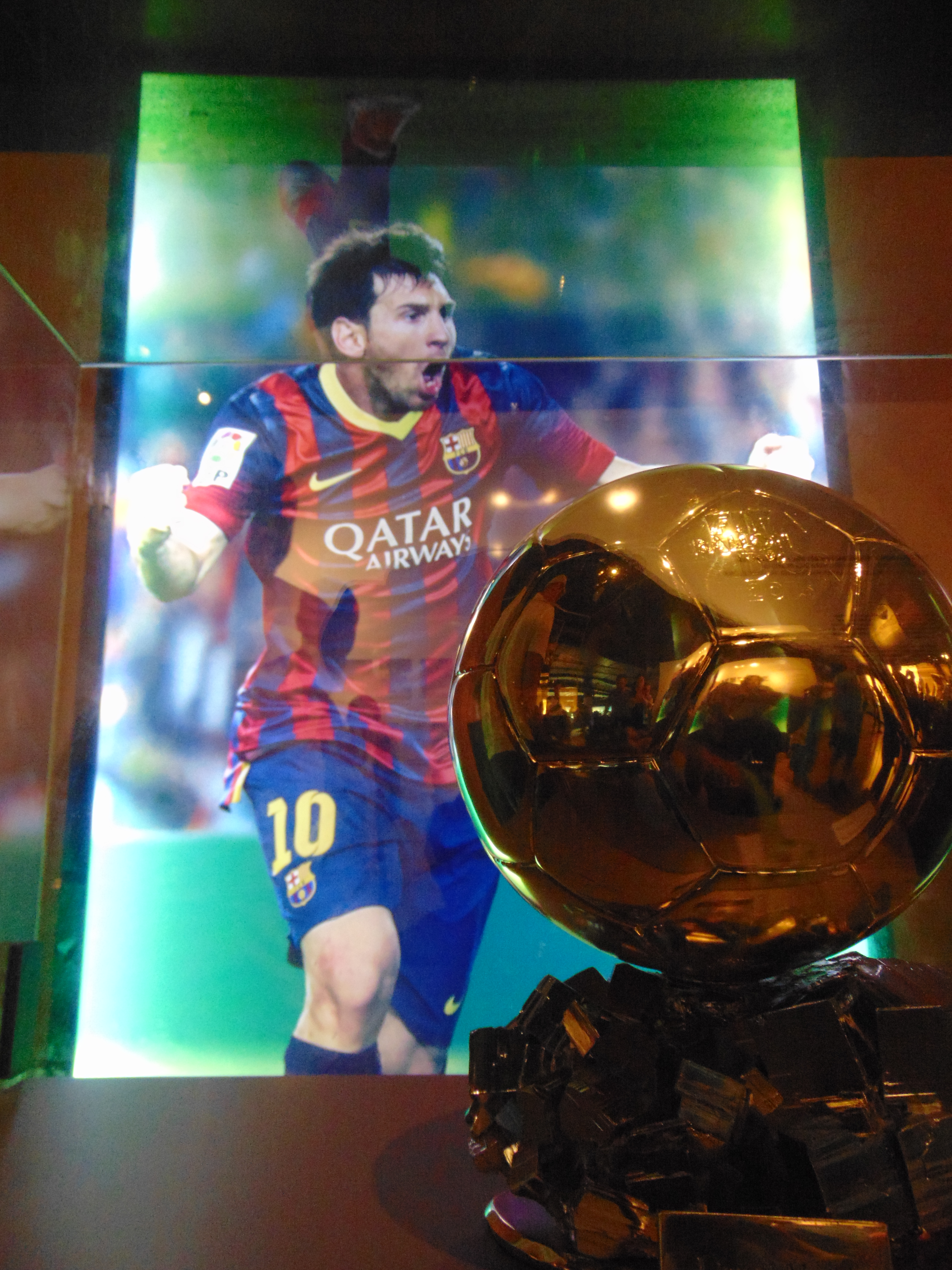
One of Lionel Messi's awards—displayed at the FC Barcelona Museum.

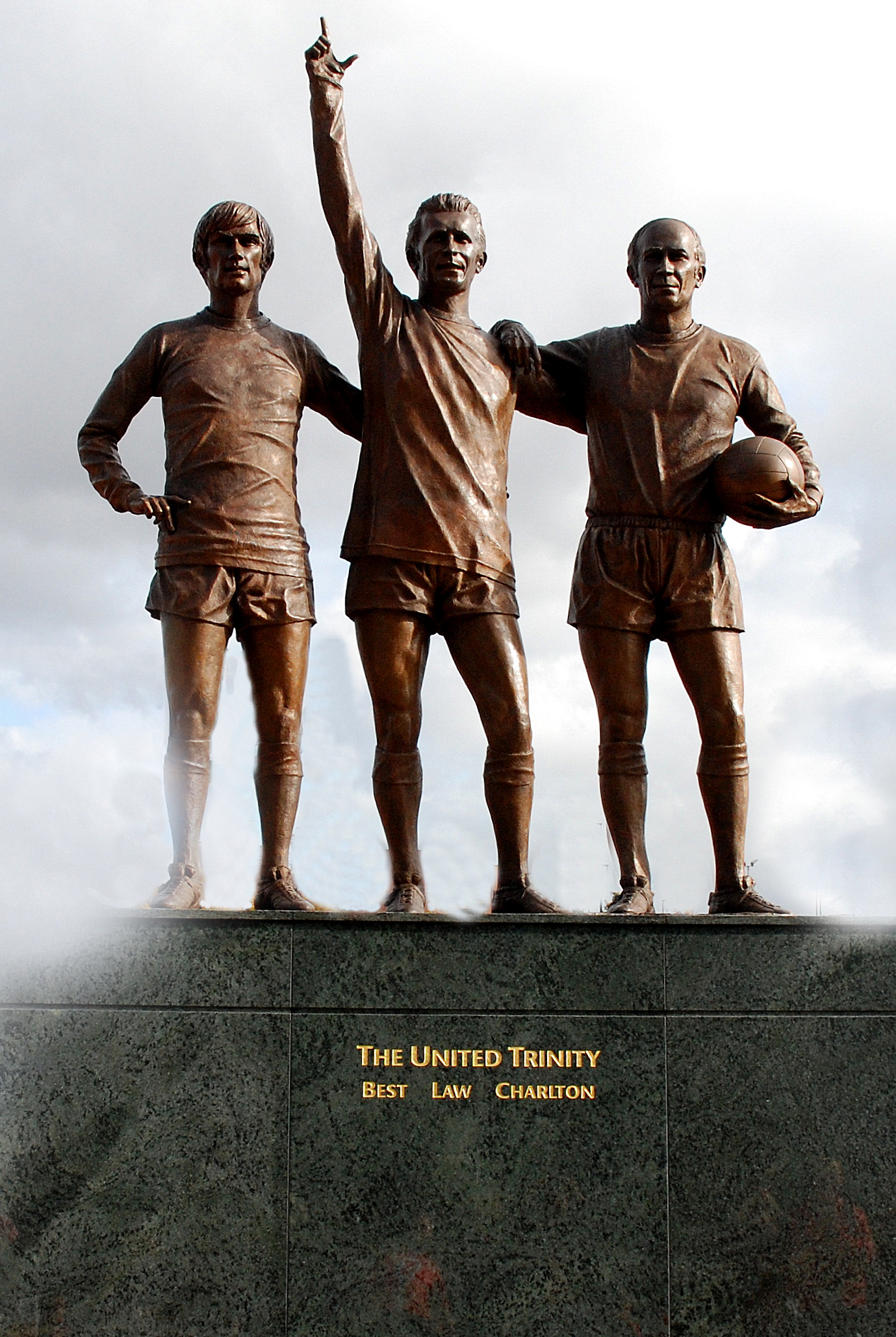
Statue outside Old Trafford of Manchester United Ballon d'Or winners (left to right) George Best, Denis Law and Bobby Charlton, known as the United Trinity.

Club	Players	Wins
(Spain) Real Madrid	8	12
(Spain) Barcelona	6	12
(Italy) Juventus	6	8
(Italy) Milan	6	8
(Germany) Bayern Munich	4	6
(England) Manchester United	4	4
(Ukraine) Dynamo Kyiv	2	2
(Italy) Inter Milan	2	2
(France) Paris Saint-Germain	2	2
(Germany) Hamburger SV	1	2
(Netherlands) Ajax	1	1
(Portugal) Benfica	1	1
(England) Blackpool	1	1
(Germany) Borussia Dortmund	1	1
(Germany) Borussia Mönchengladbach	1	1
(Czech Republic) Dukla Prague	1	1
(Russia) Dynamo Moscow	1	1
(Hungary) Ferencváros	1	1
(United States) Inter Miami	1	1
(England) Liverpool	1	1
(England) Manchester City	1	1
(France) Marseille	1	1

== Additional awards ==
=== Seasonal awards ===
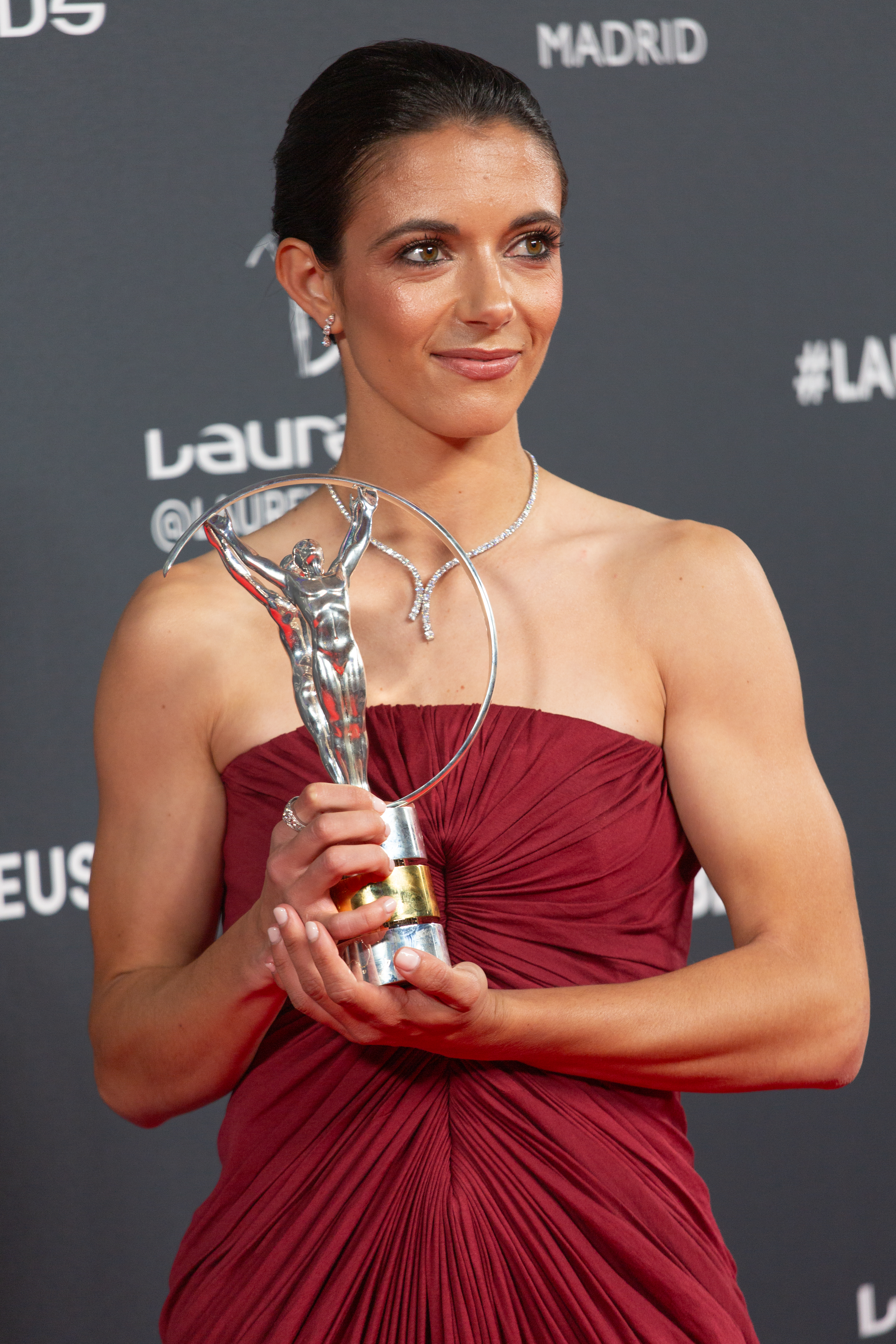
Aitana Bonmatí won the Ballon d'Or Féminin a record three times and in consecutive years, from 2023 to 2025.

In addition to the Ballon d'Or award, France Football has introduced several complementary honours over the years to recognize excellence across different aspects of the game.

Ballon d'Or seasonal awards
Award	First awarded	Description
Ballon d'Or Féminin	2018	Awarded to the female player deemed to have performed the best over the previous season.
Kopa Trophy	2018	Awarded to the best performing player under the age of 21; since 2025, also awarded in women's football.
Yashin Trophy	2019	Awarded to the best goalkeeper of the season; since 2025, also awarded in women's football.
Gerd Müller Trophy	2021	Awarded to the highest-scoring player across club and international competitions over the season; originally introduced as Striker of the Year.
Club of the Year	2021	Awarded to the best performing club of the season, based on collective achievements; since 2023, also awarded in women's football.
Sócrates Award	2022	Awarded to footballers for outstanding humanitarian and social contributions off the pitch.
Johan Cruyff Trophy	2024	Awarded to the best coach of the season; includes men's and women's categories.

=== Special awards ===
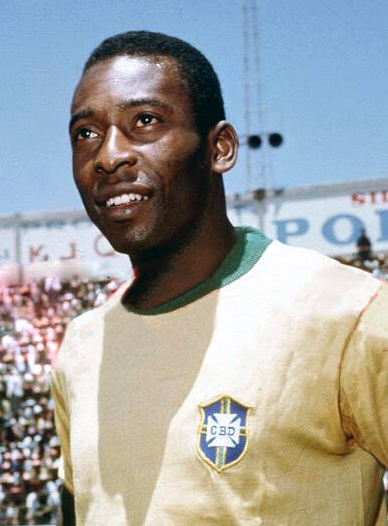
Pelé was voted Football Player of the Century in 1999. He was also the recipient of the FIFA Ballon d'Or Prix d'Honneur in 2013, and in 2020 he was selected to the Ballon d'Or Dream Team.

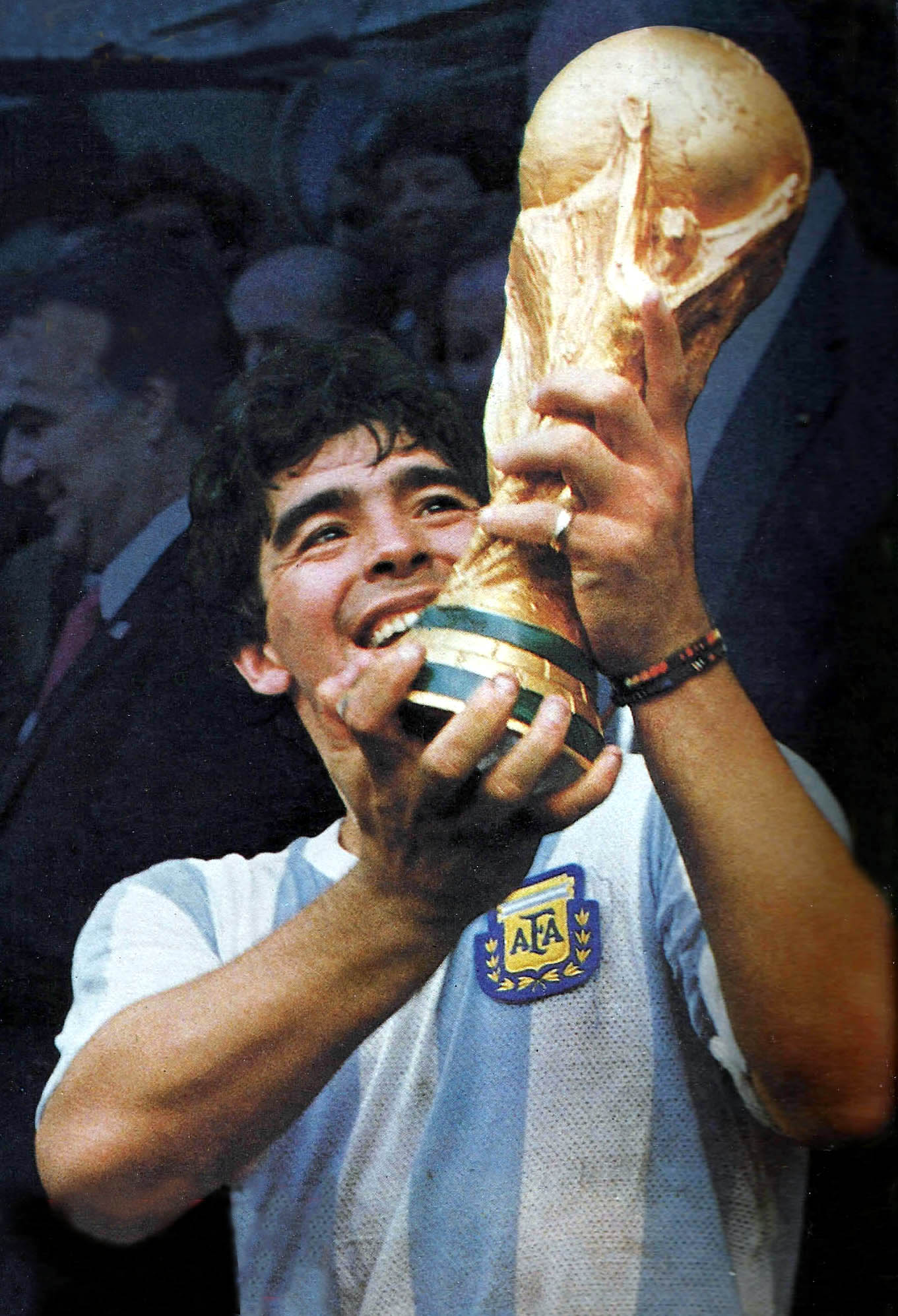
Diego Maradona was honoured with the Golden Ballon d'Or in 1995 and he was also selected to the Ballon d'Or Dream Team.

In addition to its annual awards, the Ballon d'Or has also been associated with a number of special and honorary distinctions, introduced on specific occasions to commemorate milestones, recognize all-time greatness, or address historical limitations of the award.

==== Super Ballon d'Or ====
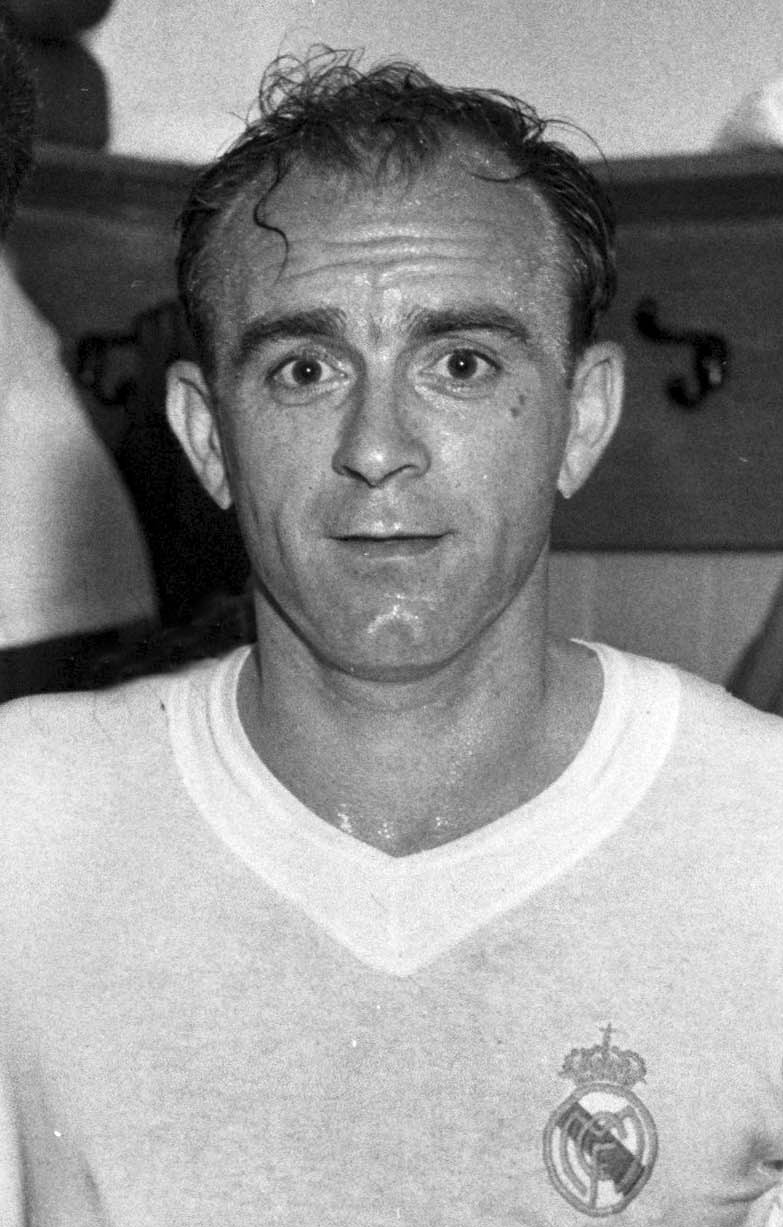
Two-time Ballon d'Or winner Alfredo Di Stéfano, recipient of the Super Ballon d'Or in 1989.

The Super Ballon d'Or is an honorary award presented to Alfredo Di Stéfano in 1989, who was voted the greatest multiple-time Ballon d'Or winner ahead of Johan Cruyff and Michel Platini.

Additionally, other honorary distinctions have been awarded in connection with the Ballon d'Or. Diego Maradona received an honorary award in 1995, referred to as the Golden Ballon d'Or, in recognition of his services to football. Pelé received a similar honour during the 2013 FIFA Ballon d'Or ceremony, known as the FIFA Ballon d'Or Prix d'Honneur.

==== Football Player of the Century ====
In 1999, France Football voted Pelé as the Football Player of the Century after consulting their former Ballon d'Or recipients. Among the 34 previous winners, 30 cast their votes, while Stanley Matthews, Omar Sívori and George Best refused to vote, and Lev Yashin had died. Each voter was allotted five votes worth up to five points; however, Di Stéfano only chose a first place, Platini a first and second place, and George Weah two players for fifth place. Pelé was named the greatest by 17 voters, receiving almost double the number of points earned by the second place, Diego Maradona.

Football Player of the Century
Player	Pts	1st	2nd	3rd	4th	5th
(Brazil) Pelé	122	17	5	4	2	1
(Argentina) Diego Maradona	65	3	6	5	5	1
(Netherlands) Johan Cruyff	62	1	4	7	9	2
(Spain) Alfredo Di Stéfano	44	4	3	3	1	1
(France) Michel Platini	40	1	5	1	3	6

==== Le nouveau palmarès ====
To coincide with the 60th anniversary of the Ballon d'Or in 2016, France Football published an internationalized reevaluation of the awards presented before 1995, when only European players were eligible to win the award. 12 out of the 39 Ballons d'Or presented during this time period would have been awarded to South American players; in addition to Pelé—seven times—and Diego Maradona—twice—Garrincha, Mario Kempes, and Romário were retrospectively recognized as worthy winners. The original recipients, however, remain unchanged.

Le nouveau palmarès (internationalized reevaluation)
Year	Original winner	Alternative
1958	(France) Raymond Kopa	(Brazil) Pelé
1959	(Spain) Alfredo Di Stéfano	(Brazil) Pelé
1960	(Spain) Luis Suárez	(Brazil) Pelé
1961	(Italy) Omar Sívori	(Brazil) Pelé
1962	(Czechoslovakia) Josef Masopust	(Brazil) Garrincha
1963	(Soviet Union) Lev Yashin	(Brazil) Pelé
1964	(Scotland) Denis Law	(Brazil) Pelé
1970	(West Germany) Gerd Müller	(Brazil) Pelé
1978	(England) Kevin Keegan	(Argentina) Mario Kempes
1986	(Soviet Union) Igor Belanov	(Argentina) Diego Maradona
1990	(Germany) Lothar Matthäus	(Argentina) Diego Maradona
1994	(Bulgaria) Hristo Stoichkov	(Brazil) Romário

==== Ballon d'Or Dream Team ====
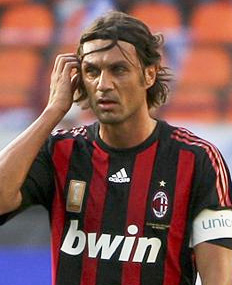
Paolo Maldini was one of the defenders named to the Ballon d'Or Dream Team.

An all-time all-star team, the Ballon d'Or Dream Team, was published in December 2020 by France Football, honouring football's greatest players of all time. A second and a third team were also published.

Ballon d'Or Dream Team
Goalkeeper	Defenders	Midfielders	Forwards
First Team
(Soviet Union) Lev Yashin	(Brazil) Cafu (West Germany) Franz Beckenbauer (Italy) Paolo Maldini	(Spain) Xavi (Germany) Lothar Matthäus (Argentina) Diego Maradona (Brazil) Pelé	(Argentina) Lionel Messi (Brazil) Ronaldo (Portugal) Cristiano Ronaldo
Second Team
(Italy) Gianluigi Buffon	(Brazil) Carlos Alberto (Italy) Franco Baresi (Brazil) Roberto Carlos	(Italy) Andrea Pirlo (Netherlands) Frank Rijkaard (France) Zinedine Zidane (Spain) Alfredo Di Stéfano	(Brazil) Garrincha (Netherlands) Johan Cruyff (Brazil) Ronaldinho
Third Team
(Germany) Manuel Neuer	(Germany) Philipp Lahm (Spain) Sergio Ramos (Germany) Paul Breitner	(Netherlands) Johan Neeskens (Brazil) Didi (France) Michel Platini (Spain) Andrés Iniesta	(Northern Ireland) George Best (Netherlands) Marco van Basten (France) Thierry Henry
