= 2016 Ballon d'Or =

Annual association football award event in France

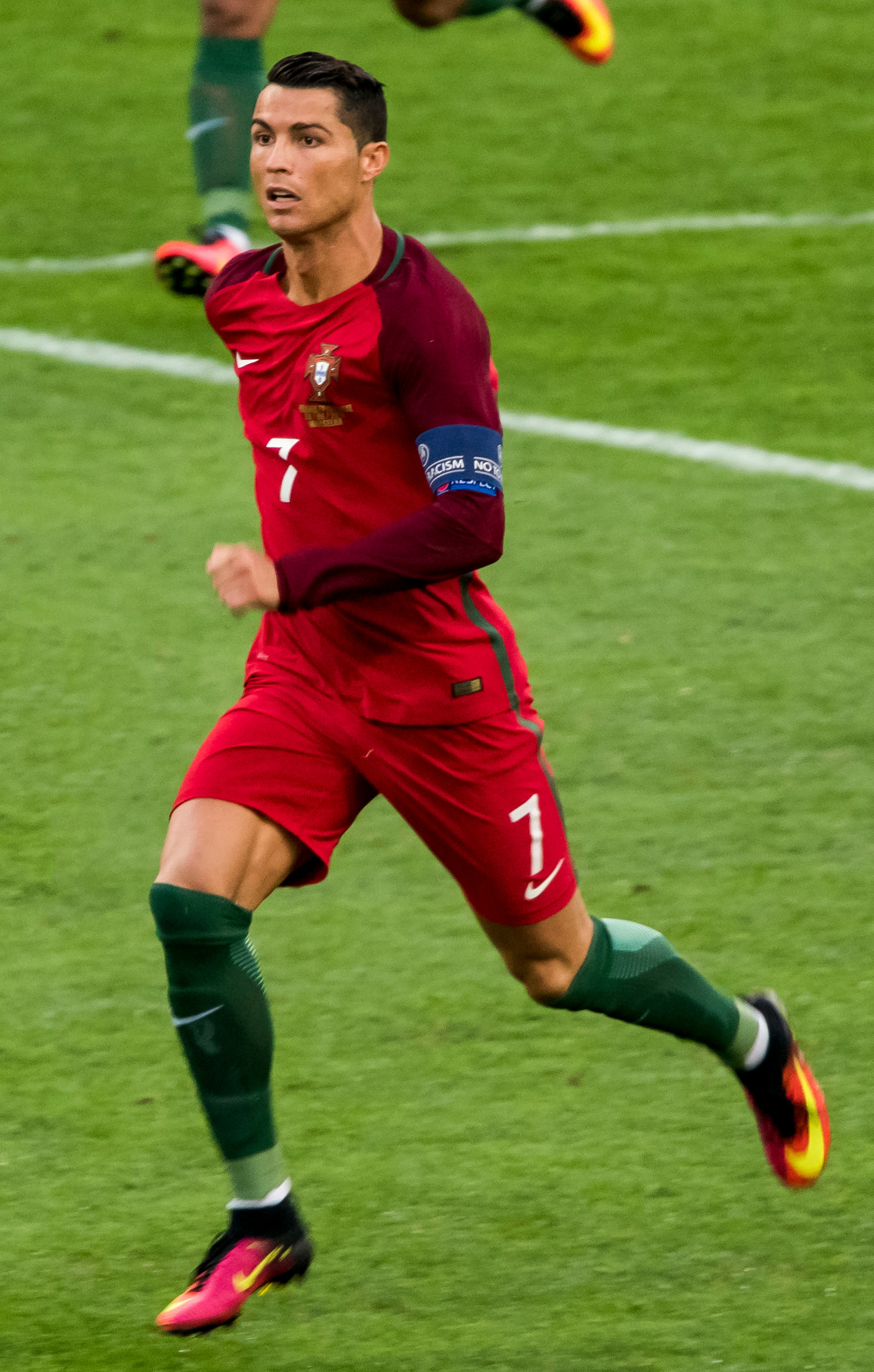
- 2016 Ballon d'Or winner, Cristiano Ronaldo
- Date: 12 December 2016
- Location: Paris, France
- Presented by: France Football

Highlights
- Won by: (Portugal) Cristiano Ronaldo (4th award)
- Website: ballondor.com

The 2016 Ballon d'Or (lit. '2016 Golden Ball'), was an award given to the best-performing football player around the world in 2016.

In September 2016, France Football announced the end of the partnership with FIFA for the FIFA Ballon d'Or and revived the original Ballon d'Or award, designating the 2016 ceremony as its 61st edition.

France Football announced that they would publish a shortlist of 30 players across six announcements with two hour intervals on 24 October 2016. On 12 December 2016, Cristiano Ronaldo won the award by a record margin of 429 points ahead of second placed Lionel Messi and Antoine Griezmann, who came third.

There were 173 voters. All were journalists, in a change from previous years, and each voter was from a different country. Each voter voted for three players who received 5 points, 3 points and one point respectively.

Ronaldo scored 745 points out of a maximum possible of 865. It was his fourth Ballon d'Or, the most of any European player in the history of the award.

== Rankings ==
Rank	Player	Club(s)	Points
1	(Portugal) Cristiano Ronaldo	(Spain) Real Madrid	745
2	(Argentina) Lionel Messi	(Spain) Barcelona	316
3	(France) Antoine Griezmann	(Spain) Atlético Madrid	198
4	(Uruguay) Luis Suárez	(Spain) Barcelona	91
5	(Brazil) Neymar	(Spain) Barcelona	68
6	(Wales) Gareth Bale	(Spain) Real Madrid	60
7	(Algeria) Riyad Mahrez	(England) Leicester City	20
8	(England) Jamie Vardy	(England) Leicester City	11
9	(Italy) Gianluigi Buffon	(Italy) Juventus	8
9	(Portugal) Pepe	(Spain) Real Madrid	8
11	(Gabon) Pierre-Emerick Aubameyang	(Germany) Borussia Dortmund	7
12	(Portugal) Rui Patrício	(Portugal) Sporting CP	6
13	(Sweden) Zlatan Ibrahimović	(France) Paris Saint-Germain (England) Manchester United	5
14	(France) Paul Pogba	(Italy) Juventus (England) Manchester United	4
14	(Chile) Arturo Vidal	(Germany) Bayern Munich	4
16	(Poland) Robert Lewandowski	(Germany) Bayern Munich	3
17	(Germany) Toni Kroos	(Spain) Real Madrid	1
17	(Croatia) Luka Modrić	(Spain) Real Madrid	1
17	(France) Dimitri Payet	(England) West Ham United	1
20	(Argentina) Sergio Agüero	(England) Manchester City	0
20	(Belgium) Kevin De Bruyne	(England) Manchester City	0
20	(Argentina) Paulo Dybala	(Italy) Juventus	0
20	(Uruguay) Diego Godín	(Spain) Atlético Madrid	0
20	(Argentina) Gonzalo Higuaín	(Italy) Napoli (Italy) Juventus	0
20	(Spain) Andrés Iniesta	(Spain) Barcelona	0
20	(Spain) Koke	(Spain) Atlético Madrid	0
20	(France) Hugo Lloris	(England) Tottenham Hotspur	0
20	(Germany) Thomas Müller	(Germany) Bayern Munich	0
20	(Germany) Manuel Neuer	(Germany) Bayern Munich	0
20	(Spain) Sergio Ramos	(Spain) Real Madrid	0
