= 2017 Ballon d'Or =

Annual association football award event in France

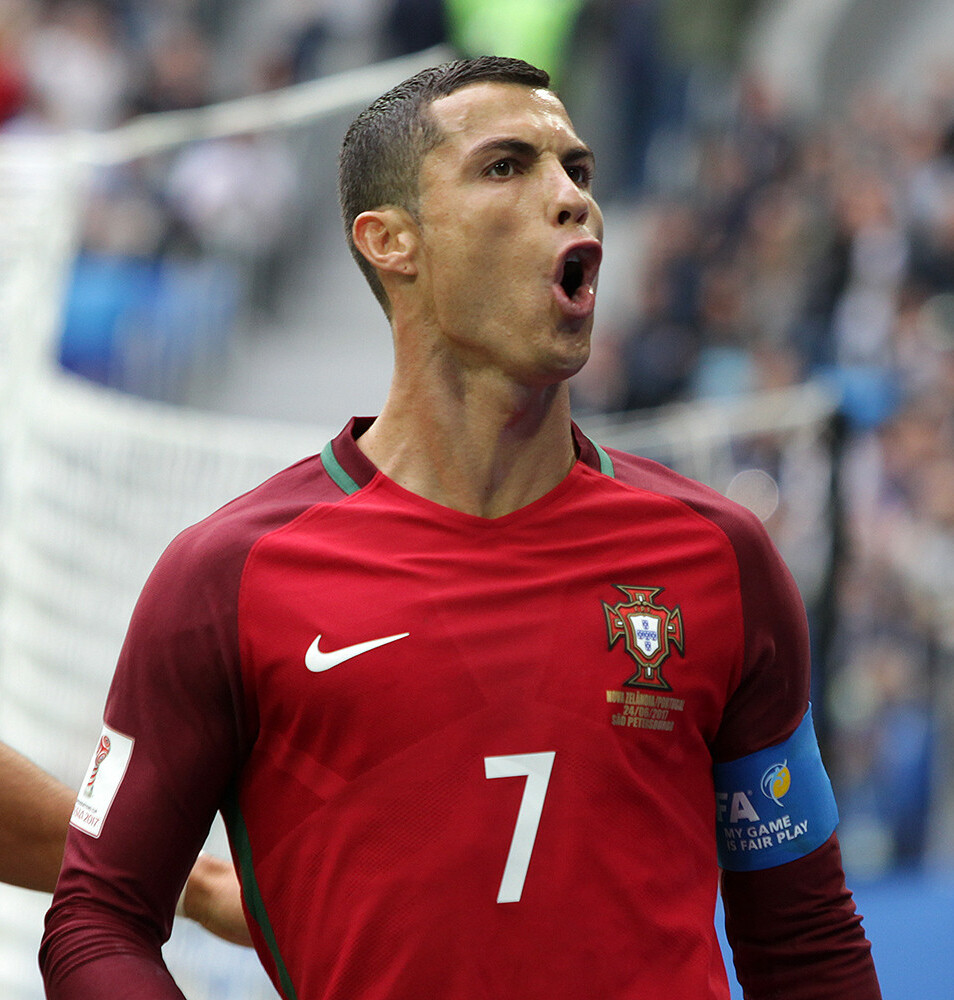
- 2017 Ballon d'Or winner, Cristiano Ronaldo
- Date: 7 December 2017
- Location: Paris, France
- Country: France
- Presented by: France Football

Highlights
- Won by: (Portugal) Cristiano Ronaldo (5th award)
- Website: ballondor.com

The 2017 Ballon d'Or (lit. '2017 Golden Ball'), was the 62nd annual award recognising the best male footballer in the world for 2017.

Cristiano Ronaldo won the award for the fifth time on 7 December 2017, equalling the highest tally of Ballons d'Or in history at the time, sharing the record with Lionel Messi.

== Rankings ==
The thirty nominees for the award were announced on 9 October 2017. The winner was announced on 7 December 2017.

Rank	Player	Club(s)	Points
1	(Portugal) Cristiano Ronaldo	(Spain) Real Madrid	946
2	(Argentina) Lionel Messi	(Spain) Barcelona	670
3	(Brazil) Neymar	(Spain) Barcelona (France) Paris Saint-Germain	361
4	(Italy) Gianluigi Buffon	(Italy) Juventus	221
5	(Croatia) Luka Modrić	(Spain) Real Madrid	84
6	(Spain) Sergio Ramos	(Spain) Real Madrid	71
7	(France) Kylian Mbappé	(France) Monaco (France) Paris Saint-Germain	48
8	(France) N'Golo Kanté	(England) Chelsea	47
9	(Poland) Robert Lewandowski	(Germany) Bayern Munich	45
10	(England) Harry Kane	(England) Tottenham Hotspur	36
11	(Uruguay) Edinson Cavani	(France) Paris Saint-Germain	32
12	(Spain) Isco	(Spain) Real Madrid	28
13	(Uruguay) Luis Suárez	(Spain) Barcelona	27
14	(Belgium) Kevin De Bruyne	(England) Manchester City	25
15	(Argentina) Paulo Dybala	(Italy) Juventus	23
16	(Brazil) Marcelo	(Spain) Real Madrid	21
17	(Germany) Toni Kroos	(Spain) Real Madrid	20
18	(France) Antoine Griezmann	(Spain) Atlético Madrid	17
19	(Belgium) Eden Hazard	(England) Chelsea	16
20	(Spain) David de Gea	(England) Manchester United	15
21	(Gabon) Pierre-Emerick Aubameyang	(Germany) Borussia Dortmund	14
21	(Italy) Leonardo Bonucci	(Italy) Juventus (Italy) Milan	14
23	(Senegal) Sadio Mané	(England) Liverpool	10
24	(Colombia) Radamel Falcao	(France) Monaco	9
25	(France) Karim Benzema	(Spain) Real Madrid	7
26	(Slovenia) Jan Oblak	(Spain) Atlético Madrid	4
27	(Germany) Mats Hummels	(Germany) Bayern Munich	3
28	(Bosnia and Herzegovina) Edin Džeko	(Italy) Roma	2
29	(Brazil) Philippe Coutinho	(England) Liverpool	0
29	(Belgium) Dries Mertens	(Italy) Napoli	0
