= 2027 Ballon d'Or =

Annual association football award

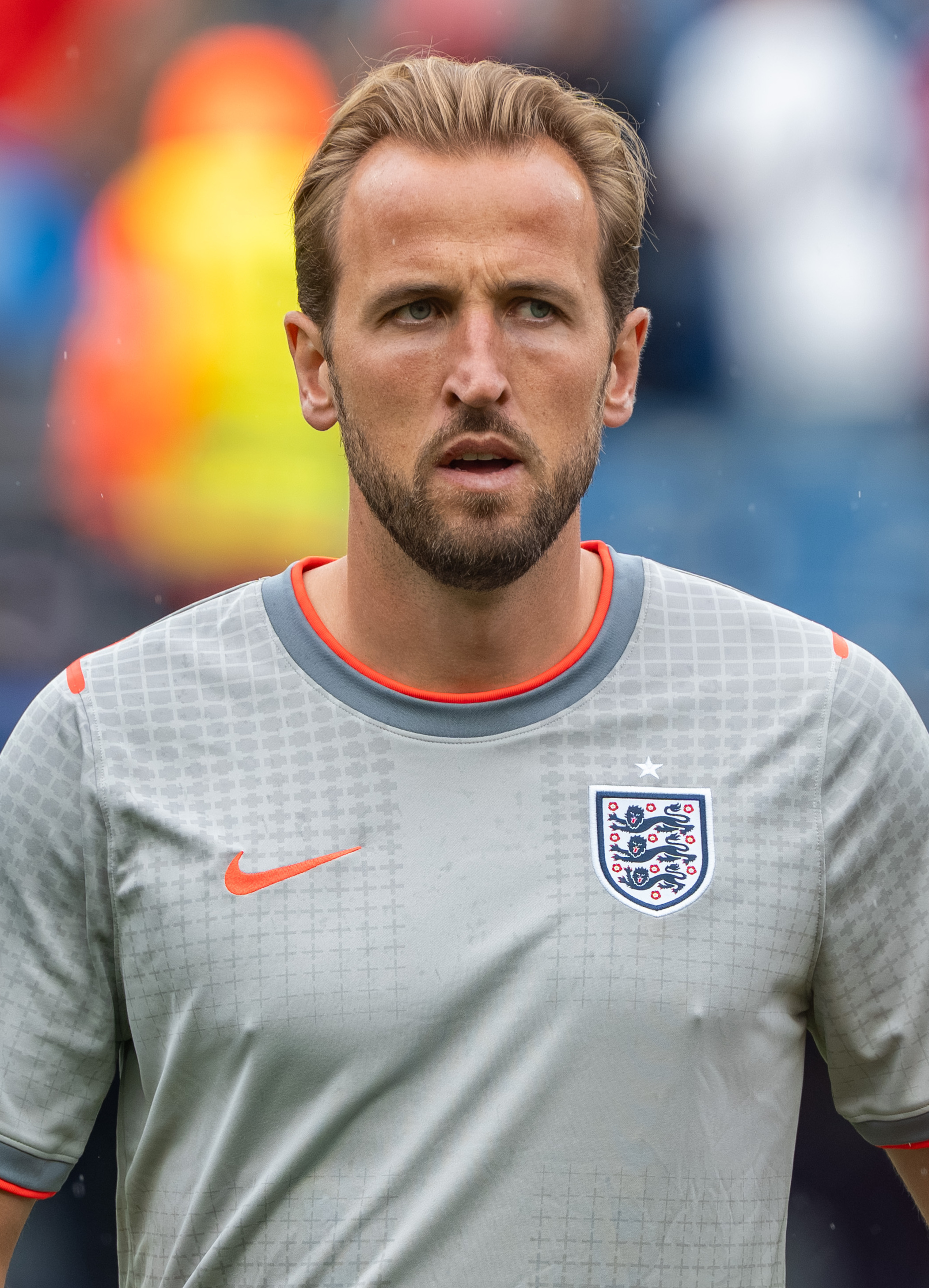
- Reigning Ballon d'Or winner Harry Kane
- Date: Not yet announced
- Location: Not yet announced

The 2027 Ballon d'Or (lit. '2027 Golden Ball') will be the 71st edition of the annual Ballon d'Or ceremony, organized by the French magazine France Football. It will be held in 2027 to recognize the world's best football players for their performances during the 2026–27 season.
