= 1989 Ballon d'Or =

Annual association football award event in France

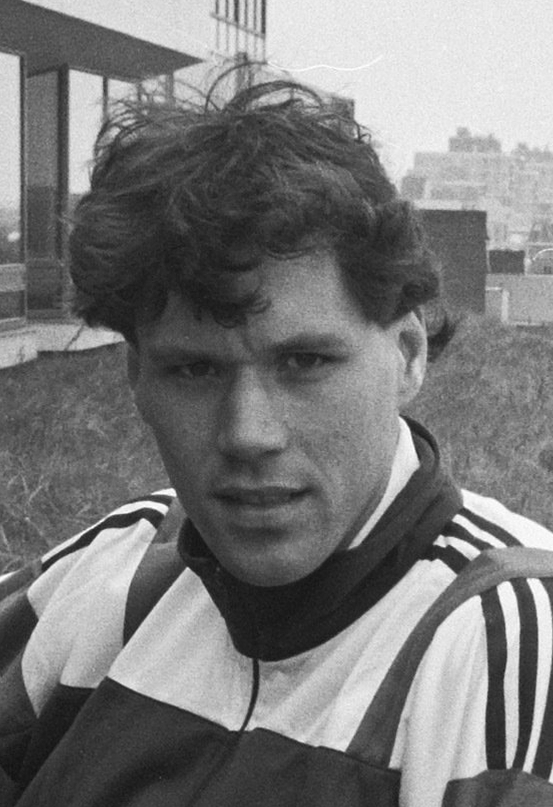
- 1989 Ballon d'Or winner, Marco van Basten
- Date: 26 December 1989
- Presented by: France Football

Highlights
- Won by: (Netherlands) Marco Van Basten (2nd award)
- Website: ballondor.com

The 1989 Ballon d'Or, given to the best football player in Europe as judged by a panel of sports journalists from UEFA member countries, was awarded to Marco van Basten on 26 December 1989. There were 27 voters, from Albania, Austria, Belgium, Bulgaria, Czechoslovakia, Denmark, East Germany, England, Finland, France, Greece, Hungary, Italy, Luxembourg, the Netherlands, Poland, Portugal, Republic of Ireland, Romania, Scotland, Soviet Union, Spain, Sweden, Switzerland, Turkey, West Germany and Yugoslavia. Van Basten was awarded to Ballon d'Or for the second time.

== Rankings ==
Rank	Name	Club(s)	Nationality	Points
1	Marco van Basten	(Italy) Milan	Netherlands	119
2	Franco Baresi	(Italy) Milan	Italy	80
3	Frank Rijkaard	(Italy) Milan	Netherlands	43
4	Lothar Matthäus	(Italy) Internazionale	West Germany	24
5	Peter Shilton	(England) Derby County	England	22
6	Dragan Stojković	(Socialist Federal Republic of Yugoslavia) Red Star Belgrade	Yugoslavia	19
7	Ruud Gullit	(Italy) Milan	Netherlands	16
8	Gheorghe Hagi	(Romania) Steaua București	Romania	11
8	Jürgen Klinsmann	(Italy) Internazionale	West Germany	11
10	Jean-Pierre Papin	(France) Marseille	France	10
10	Michel Preud'homme	(Belgium) Mechelen	Belgium	10
12	Oleksiy Mykhaylychenko	(Soviet Union) Dynamo Kyiv	Soviet Union	6
13	Míchel	(Spain) Real Madrid	Spain	5
14	Andreas Brehme	(Italy) Internazionale	West Germany	3
14	Paulo Futre	(Spain) Atlético Madrid	Portugal	3
14	Karl-Heinz Riedle	(West Germany) Werder Bremen	West Germany	3
17	John Barnes	(England) Liverpool	England	2
17	Packie Bonner	(Scotland) Celtic	Republic of Ireland	2
17	Glenn Hysén	(England) Liverpool	Sweden	2
17	Oleh Kuznetsov	(Soviet Union) Dynamo Kyiv	Soviet Union	2
17	Andreas Möller	(West Germany) Borussia Dortmund	West Germany	2
17	Julio Salinas	(Spain) Barcelona	Spain	2
23	Thomas Häßler	(West Germany) 1. FC Köln	West Germany	1
23	Ronald Koeman	(Spain) Barcelona	Netherlands	1
23	Robby Langers	(France) Nice	Luxembourg	1
23	Gary Lineker	(England) Tottenham Hotspur	England	1
23	Paolo Maldini	(Italy) Milan	Italy	1
23	Theo Snelders	(Scotland) Aberdeen	Netherlands	1
23	Gianluca Vialli	(Italy) Sampdoria	Italy	1
23	Oleksandr Zavarov	(Italy) Juventus	Soviet Union	1

== Super Ballon D'Or ==
France Football awarded Alfredo Di Stéfano with the Super Ballon d'Or as the Argentinian legend came out on top beating Johan Cruyff and Michel Platini in the vote. All the previous winners of the award since 1956 were considered eligible for the nomination.
