= 1976 Ballon d'Or =

Annual association football award event in France

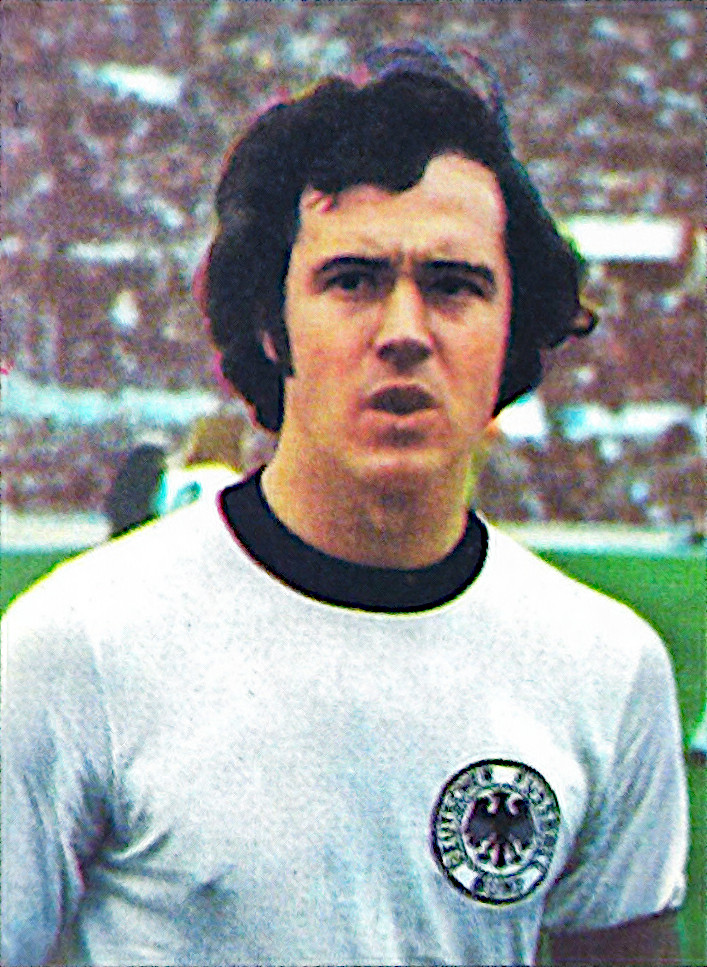
- 1976 Ballon d'Or winner, Franz Beckenbauer
- Date: 28 December 1976
- Presented by: France Football

Highlights
- Won by: (Germany) Franz Beckenbauer (2nd award)
- Website: ballondor.com

The 1976 Ballon d'Or, given to the best football player in Europe as judged by a panel of sports journalists from UEFA member countries, was awarded to the West German defender Franz Beckenbauer on 28 December 1976. There were 26 voters, from Austria, Belgium, Bulgaria, Czechoslovakia, Denmark, East Germany, England, Finland, France, Greece, Hungary, Italy, Luxembourg, the Netherlands, Norway, Poland, Portugal, Republic of Ireland, Romania, Soviet Union, Spain, Sweden, Switzerland, Turkey, West Germany and Yugoslavia.

== Rankings ==
Rank	Name	Club(s)	Nationality	Points
1	Franz Beckenbauer	(West Germany) Bayern Munich	West Germany	91
2	Rob Rensenbrink	(Belgium) Anderlecht	Netherlands	75
3	Ivo Viktor	(Czech Republic) Dukla Prague	Czechoslovakia	52
4	Kevin Keegan	(England) Liverpool	England	32
5	Michel Platini	(France) Nancy	France	19
6	Anton Ondruš	(Czech Republic) Slovan Bratislava	Czechoslovakia	16
7	Johan Cruyff	(Spain) Barcelona	Netherlands	12
7	Ivan Ćurković	(France) Saint-Étienne	Yugoslavia	12
9	Rainer Bonhof	(West Germany) Borussia Mönchengladbach	West Germany	9
9	Gerd Müller	(West Germany) Bayern Munich	West Germany	9
9	Marián Masný	(Czech Republic) Slovan Bratislava	Czechoslovakia	9
12	Franco Causio	(Italy) Juventus	Italy	7
13	Berti Vogts	(West Germany) Borussia Mönchengladbach	West Germany	6
14	Tibor Nyilasi	(Hungary) Ferencváros	Hungary	5
15	Roberto Bettega	(Italy) Juventus	Italy	4
15	Jürgen Croy	(East Germany) Sachsenring Zwickau	East Germany	4
15	Dudu Georgescu	(Romania) Dinamo București	Romania	4
15	Jaroslav Pollák	(Czech Republic) VSS Košice	Czechoslovakia	4
19	Oleg Blokhin	(Soviet Union) Dinamo Kyiv	Soviet Union	3
19	Joachim Streich	(East Germany) 1. FC Magdeburg	East Germany	3
21	Gérard Janvion	(France) Saint-Étienne	France	2
21	Dieter Müller	(West Germany) 1. FC Köln	West Germany	2
21	Dominique Rocheteau	(France) Saint-Étienne	France	2
21	Santillana	(Spain) Real Madrid	Spain	2
21	Benny Wendt	(West Germany) Tennis Borussia Berlin	Sweden	2
26	Dominique Bathenay	(France) Saint-Étienne	France	1
26	Jupp Heynckes	(West Germany) Borussia Mönchengladbach	West Germany	1
26	Ali Kemal	(Turkey) Trabzonspor	Turkey	1
26	Dino Zoff	(Italy) Juventus	Italy	1
