= 1984 Ballon d'Or =

Annual association football award event in France

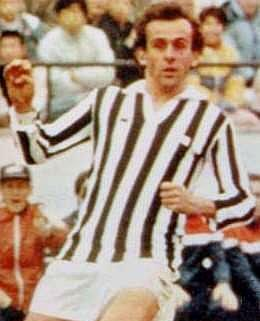
- 1984 Ballon d'Or winner, Michel Platini in 1985
- Date: 25 December 1984
- Presented by: France Football

Highlights
- Won by: (France) Michel Platini (2nd award)
- Website: ballondor.com

The 1984 Ballon d'Or, given to the best football player in Europe as judged by a panel of sports journalists from UEFA member countries, was awarded to Michel Platini on 25 December 1984.

== Rankings ==
Rank	Name	Club(s)	Nationality	Points
1	Michel Platini	(Italy) Juventus	France	128
2	Jean Tigana	(France) Bordeaux	France	57
3	Preben Elkjær	(Italy) Hellas Verona	Denmark	48
4	Ian Rush	(England) Liverpool	Wales	44
5	Fernando Chalana	(France) Bordeaux	Portugal	18
6	Graeme Souness	(Italy) Sampdoria	Scotland	16
7	Harald Schumacher	(West Germany) 1. FC Köln	West Germany	12
8	Karl-Heinz Rummenigge	(Italy) Internazionale	West Germany	10
9	Alain Giresse	(France) Bordeaux	France	9
10	Bryan Robson	(England) Manchester United	England	7
11	Bernd Schuster	(Spain) Barcelona	West Germany	6
12	Enzo Scifo	(Belgium) Anderlecht	Belgium	5
12	Maxime Bossis	(France) Nantes	France	5
14	Klaus Allofs	(West Germany) 1. FC Köln	West Germany	3
14	Antonio Cabrini	(Italy) Juventus	Italy	3
14	Hans-Peter Briegel	(Italy) Hellas Verona	West Germany	3
14	Rui Jordão	(Portugal) Sporting CP	Portugal	3
18	Paul McStay	(Scotland) Celtic	Scotland	2
18	Jesper Olsen	(England) Manchester United	Denmark	2
18	Morten Olsen	(Belgium) Anderlecht	Denmark	2
18	Gordon Strachan	(England) Manchester United	Scotland	2
22	Rinat Dasayev	(Soviet Union) Spartak Moscow	Soviet Union	1
22	Mark Hateley	(Italy) Milan	England	1
22	Silviu Lung	(Romania) Universitatea Craiova	Romania	1
22	Antonio Maceda	(Spain) Sporting Gijón	Spain	1
22	Torbjörn Nilsson	(Sweden) IFK Göteborg	Sweden	1
