= 1993 Ballon d'Or =

Annual association football award event in France

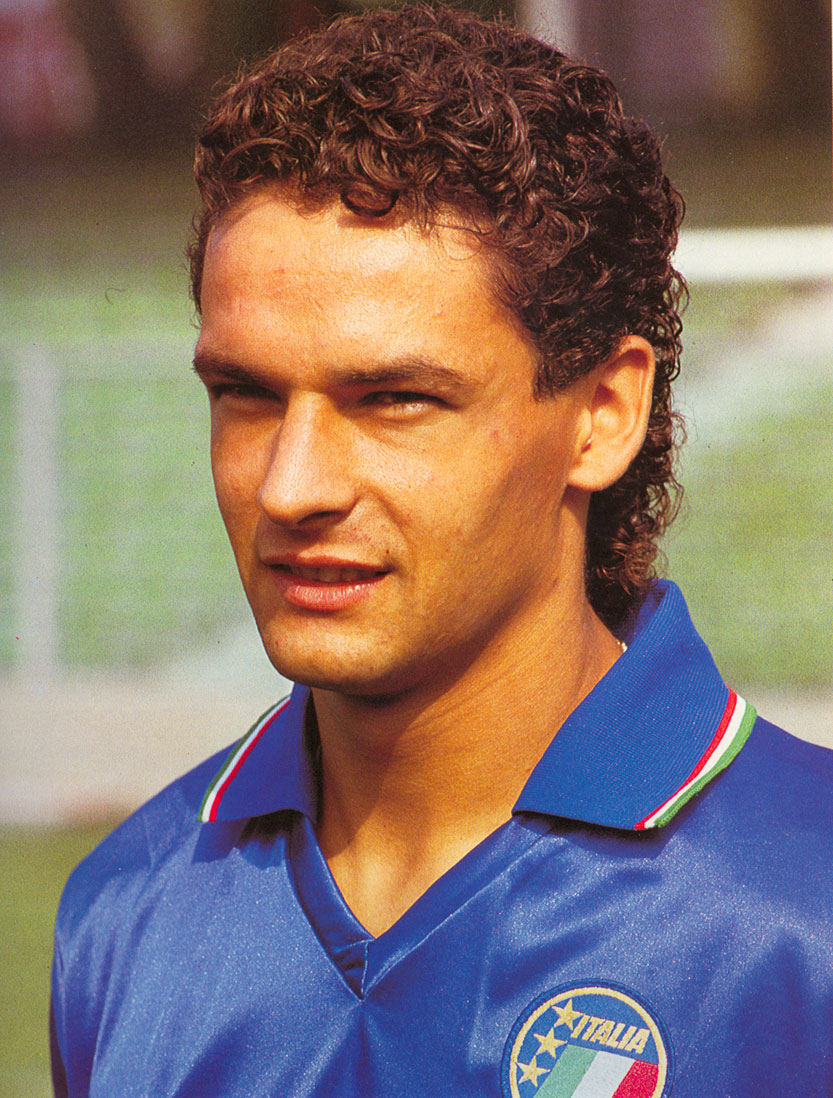
- 1993 Ballon d'Or winner, Roberto Baggio in 1990
- Date: 28 December 1993
- Presented by: France Football

Highlights
- Won by: (Italy) Roberto Baggio (1st award)
- Website: ballondor.com

The 1993 Ballon d'Or, given to the best football player in Europe as judged by a panel of sports journalists from UEFA member countries, was awarded to Roberto Baggio on 28 December 1993.

== Rankings ==
Rank	Name	Club(s)	Nationality	Points
1	Roberto Baggio	(Italy) Juventus	Italy	142
2	Dennis Bergkamp	(Italy) Internazionale	Netherlands	83
3	Eric Cantona	(England) Manchester United	France	34
4	Alen Bokšić	(Italy) Lazio	Croatia	29
5	Michael Laudrup	(Spain) Barcelona	Denmark	27
6	Franco Baresi	(Italy) Milan	Italy	24
7	Paolo Maldini	(Italy) Milan	Italy	19
8	Emil Kostadinov	(Portugal) Porto	Bulgaria	11
9	Stéphane Chapuisat	(Germany) Borussia Dortmund	Switzerland	9
9	Ryan Giggs	(England) Manchester United	Wales	9
11	Andreas Möller	(Italy) Juventus	Germany	7
12	Ruud Gullit	(Italy) Sampdoria	Netherlands	6
12	Peter Schmeichel	(England) Manchester United	Denmark	6
12	Hristo Stoichkov	(Spain) Barcelona	Bulgaria	6
15	Basile Boli	(France) Marseille	France	5
15	Rune Bratseth	(Germany) Werder Bremen	Norway	5
17	Enzo Scifo	(France) Monaco	Belgium	4
18	Andreas Herzog	(Germany) Werder Bremen	Austria	3
18	Ronald Koeman	(Spain) Barcelona	Netherlands	3
18	Jari Litmanen	(Netherlands) Ajax	Finland	3
21	Dino Baggio	(Italy) Juventus	Italy	2
21	Sergei Kiriakov	(Germany) Karlsruher SC	Russia	2
21	David Platt	(Italy) Sampdoria	England	2
21	Franck Sauzée	(Italy) Atalanta	France	2
21	Giuseppe Signori	(Italy) Lazio	Italy	2
26	Tomas Brolin	(Italy) Parma	Sweden	1
26	Martin Dahlin	(Germany) Borussia Mönchengladbach	Sweden	1
26	Georges Grün	(Italy) Parma	Belgium	1
26	Stelios Manolas	(Greece) AEK Athens	Greece	1
26	Paul McGrath	(England) Aston Villa	Republic of Ireland	1
