= 1990 Ballon d'Or =

Annual association football award event in France

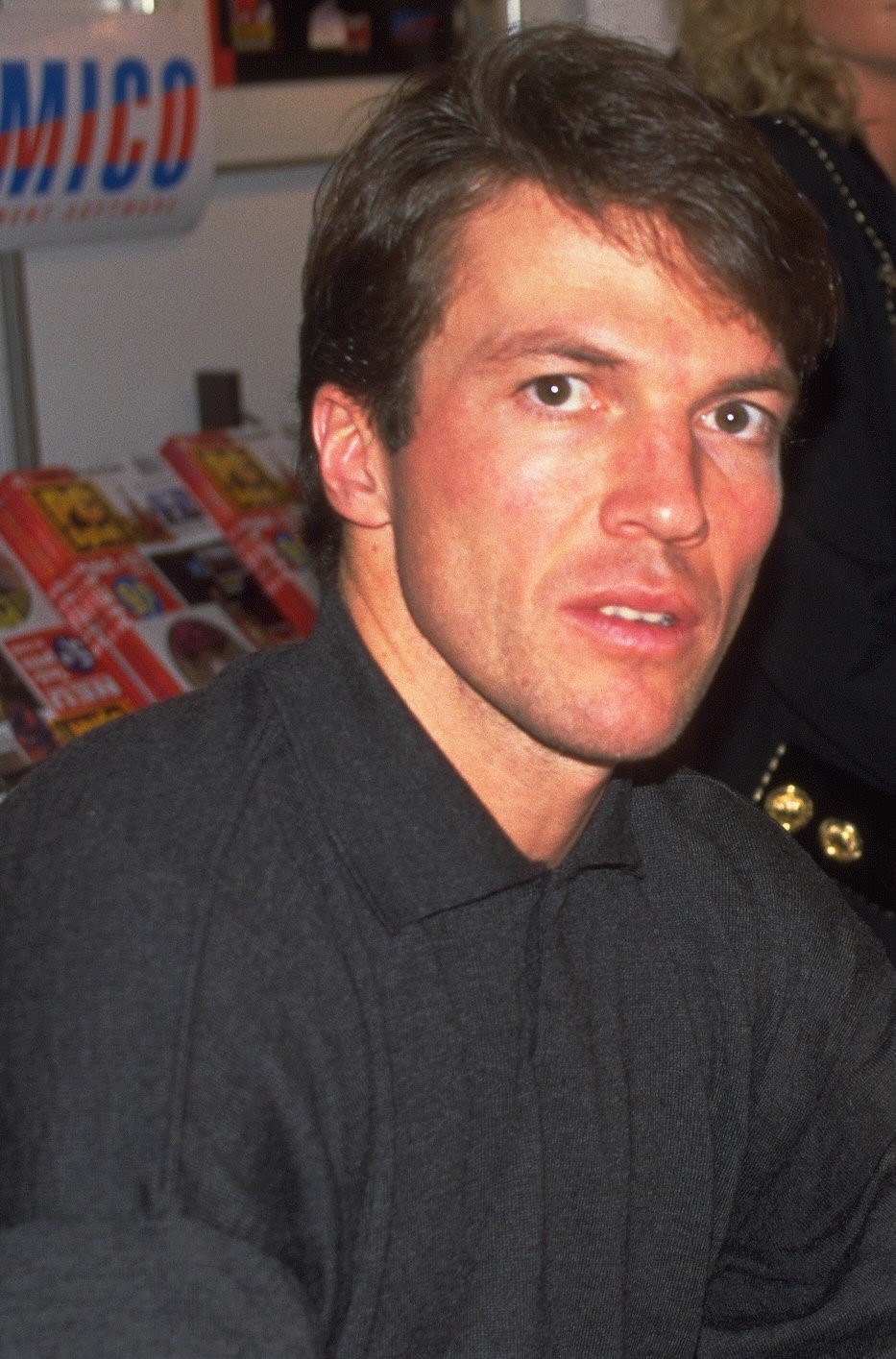
- 1990 Ballon d'Or winner, Lothar Matthäus in 1995
- Date: 25 December 1990
- Presented by: France Football

Highlights
- Won by: (Germany) Lothar Matthäus (1st award)
- Website: ballondor.com

The 1990 Ballon d'Or, given to the best football player in Europe as judged by a panel of sports journalists from UEFA member countries, was awarded to Lothar Matthäus on 25 December 1990.

== Rankings ==
Rank	Name	Club(s)	Nationality	Points
1	Lothar Matthäus	(Italy) Internazionale	Germany	137
2	Salvatore Schillaci	(Italy) Juventus	Italy	84
3	Andreas Brehme	(Italy) Internazionale	Germany	68
4	Paul Gascoigne	(England) Tottenham Hotspur	England	43
5	Franco Baresi	(Italy) Milan	Italy	37
6	Enzo Scifo	(France) Auxerre	Belgium	12
6	Jürgen Klinsmann	(Italy) Internazionale	Germany	12
8	Roberto Baggio	(Italy) Fiorentina (Italy) Juventus	Italy	8
9	Frank Rijkaard	(Italy) Milan	Netherlands	7
10	Guido Buchwald	(Germany) VfB Stuttgart	Germany	6
11	Jean-Pierre Papin	(France) Marseille	France	3
12	Rafael Martín Vázquez	(Spain) Real Madrid (Italy) Torino	Spain	2
12	Paul McGrath	(England) Aston Villa	Republic of Ireland	2
12	Robert Prosinečki	(Socialist Federal Republic of Yugoslavia) Red Star Belgrade	Yugoslavia	2
12	Des Walker	(England) Nottingham Forest	England	2
12	Walter Zenga	(Italy) Internazionale	Italy	2
12	Dragan Stojković	(Socialist Federal Republic of Yugoslavia) Red Star Belgrade (France) Marseille	Yugoslavia	2
18	John Barnes	(England) Liverpool	England	1
18	Michael Laudrup	(Spain) Barcelona	Denmark	1
18	Gary Lineker	(England) Tottenham Hotspur	England	1
18	David Platt	(England) Aston Villa	England	1
18	Rudi Völler	(Italy) Roma	Germany	1
18	Chris Waddle	(France) Marseille	England	1
