= 1992 Ballon d'Or =

Annual association football award event in France

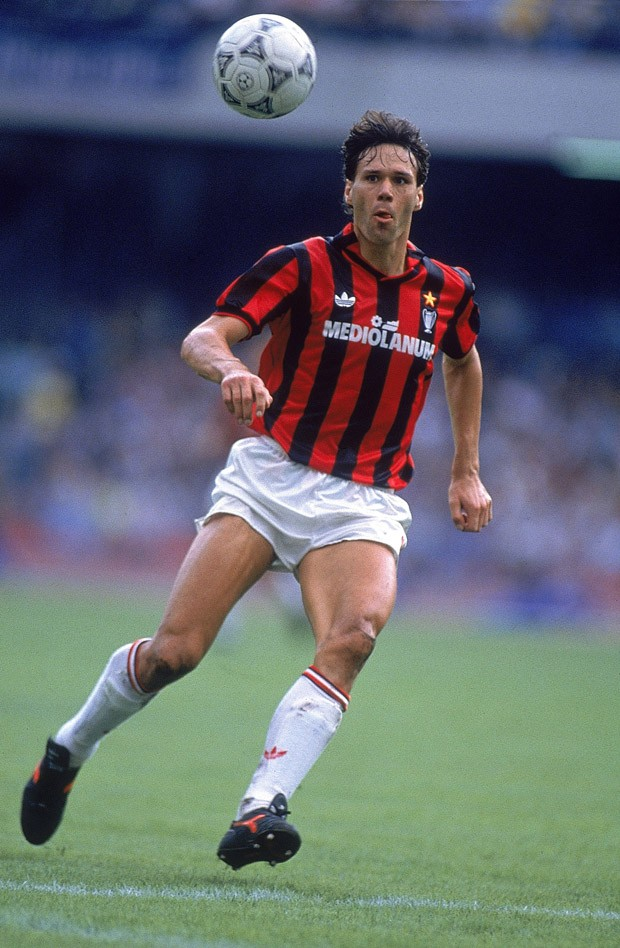
- 1992 Ballon d'Or winner, Marco van Basten
- Date: 22 December 1992
- Presented by: France Football

Highlights
- Won by: (Netherlands) Marco Van Basten (3rd award)
- Website: ballondor.com

The 1992 Ballon d'Or, given to the best football player in Europe as judged by a panel of sports journalists from UEFA member countries, was awarded to Marco van Basten on 22 December 1992.

== Rankings ==
Rank	Name	Club(s)	Nationality	Points
1	Marco van Basten	(Italy) Milan	Netherlands	98
2	Hristo Stoichkov	(Spain) Barcelona	Bulgaria	80
3	Dennis Bergkamp	(Netherlands) Ajax	Netherlands	53
4	Thomas Häßler	(Italy) Roma	Germany	42
5	Peter Schmeichel	(England) Manchester United	Denmark	41
6	Brian Laudrup	(Italy) Fiorentina	Denmark	32
7	Michael Laudrup	(Spain) Barcelona	Denmark	22
8	Ronald Koeman	(Spain) Barcelona	Netherlands	14
9	Stéphane Chapuisat	(Germany) Borussia Dortmund	Switzerland	10
10	Frank Rijkaard	(Italy) Milan	Netherlands	8
10	Enzo Scifo	(Italy) Torino	Belgium	8
12	Flemming Povlsen	(Germany) Borussia Dortmund	Denmark	6
13	Henrik Larsen	(Italy) Pisa	Denmark	4
14	John Jensen	(England) Arsenal	Denmark	3
14	Paolo Maldini	(Italy) Milan	Italy	3
16	Henrik Andersen	(Germany) 1. FC Köln	Denmark	2
16	David Platt	(Italy) Juventus	England	2
16	Tomas Brolin	(Italy) Parma	Sweden	2
16	Jean-Pierre Papin	(Italy) Milan	France	2
20	Franco Baresi	(Italy) Milan	Italy	1
20	Rune Bratseth	(Germany) Werder Bremen	Norway	1
20	Andreas Herzog	(Germany) Werder Bremen	Austria	1
