= 1963 Ballon d'Or =

Annual football award event in France

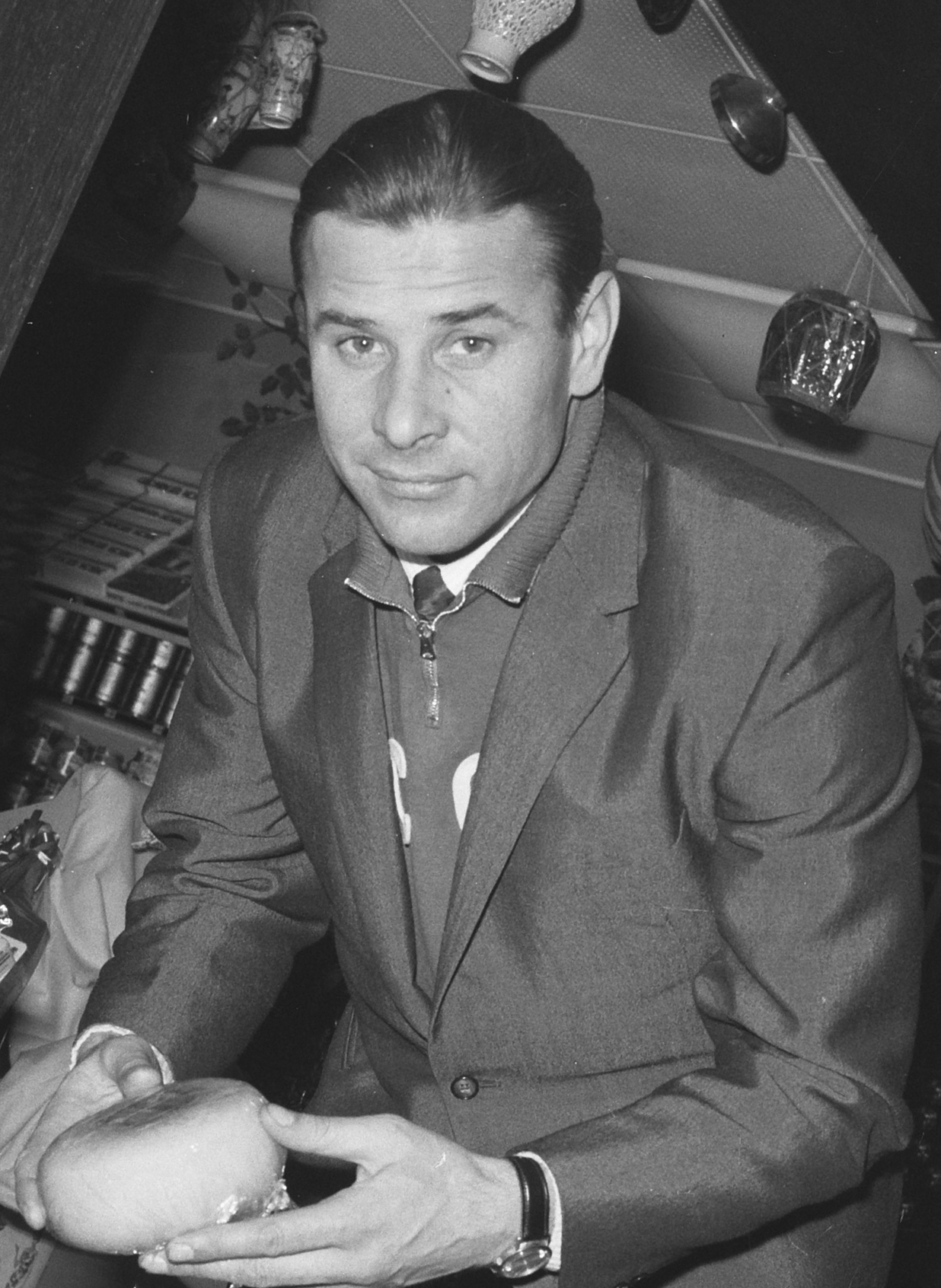
- 1963 Ballon d'Or winner, Lev Yashin in 1965
- Date: 17 December 1963
- Location: Paris, France
- Presented by: France Football

Highlights
- Won by: (Soviet Union) Lev Yashin (1st award)
- Website: ballondor.com

The 1963 Ballon d'Or, given to the best football player in the World as judged by a panel of sports journalists from France Football member countries, was awarded to Lev Yashin on 17 December 1963. He was the first, and as of 2026, the only goalkeeper to win this award. He also became the first Soviet and Russian national to win the award.

== Rankings ==
Rank	Name	Club(s)	Nationality	Points
1	Lev Yashin	(Soviet Union) Dynamo Moscow	Soviet Union	73
2	Gianni Rivera	(Italy) Milan	Italy	55
3	Jimmy Greaves	(England) Tottenham Hotspur	England	50
4	Denis Law	(England) Manchester United	Scotland	45
5	Eusébio	(Portugal) Benfica	Portugal	19
6	Karl-Heinz Schnellinger	(West Germany) 1. FC Köln (Italy) Mantova	West Germany	16
7	Uwe Seeler	(West Germany) Hamburger SV	West Germany	9
8	Bobby Charlton	(England) Manchester United	England	5
8	Luis Suárez	(Italy) Inter Milan	Spain	5
8	Giovanni Trapattoni	(Italy) Milan	Italy	5
11	José Altafini	(Italy) Milan	Brazil	4
11	Paul Van Himst	(Belgium) Anderlecht	Belgium	4
13	Flórián Albert	(Hungary) Ferencváros	Hungary	3
13	Harry Bild	(Sweden) IFK Norrköping	Sweden	3
13	Josef Masopust	(Czechoslovakia) Dukla Prague	Czechoslovakia	3
13	Omar Sívori	(Italy) Juventus	Argentina	3
17	Robert Herbin	(France) Saint-Étienne	France	2
17	Jef Jurion	(Belgium) Anderlecht	Belgium	2
17	Cesare Maldini	(Italy) Milan	Italy	2
17	Károly Sándor	(Hungary) MTK Budapest	Hungary	2
21	Mário Coluna	(Portugal) Benfica	Portugal	1
21	Ake Johansson	(Sweden) IFK Norrköping	Sweden	1
21	Manfred Kaiser	(East Germany) Wismut Aue	East Germany	1
21	Metin Oktay	(Turkey) Galatasaray	Turkey	1
21	Svatopluk Pluskal	(Czechoslovakia) Dukla Prague	Czechoslovakia	1
