= 1966 Ballon d'Or =

Annual association football award event in France

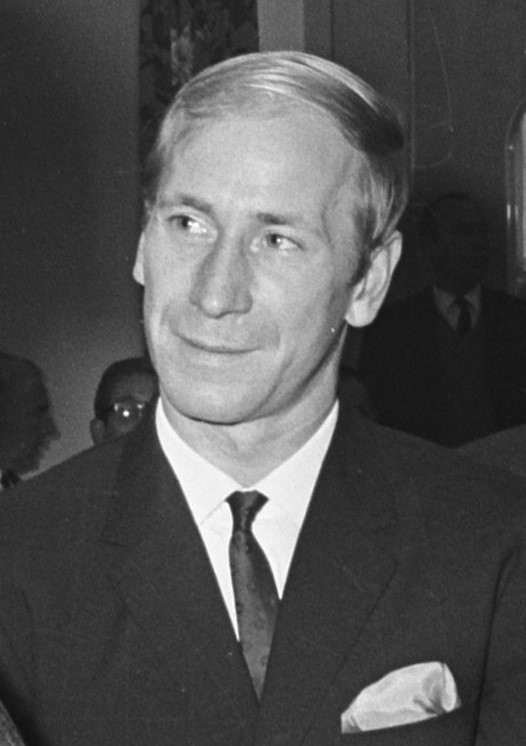
- 1966 Ballon d'Or winner, Bobby Charlton
- Date: 27 December 1966
- Location: Paris, France
- Presented by: France Football

Highlights
- Won by: (England) Bobby Charlton (1st award)
- Website: ballondor.com

The 1966 Ballon d'Or, given to the best football player in Europe as judged by a panel of sports journalists from UEFA member countries, was awarded to Bobby Charlton on 27 December 1966. He finished a single point ahead of Eusébio.

== Rankings ==
Rank	Name	Club(s)	Nationality	Points
1	Bobby Charlton	(England) Manchester United	England	81
2	Eusébio	(Portugal) Benfica	Portugal	80
3	Franz Beckenbauer	(West Germany) Bayern Munich	West Germany	59
4	Bobby Moore	(England) West Ham United	England	31
5	Flórián Albert	(Hungary) Ferencváros	Hungary	23
6	Ferenc Bene	(Hungary) Újpest	Hungary	8
7	Lev Yashin	(Soviet Union) Dynamo Moscow	Soviet Union	6
8	Alan Ball	(England) Blackpool (England) Everton	England	6
9	János Farkas	(Hungary) Vasas	Hungary	6
10	José Torres	(Portugal) Benfica	Portugal	5
11	Mario Corso	(Italy) Internazionale	Italy	4
11	Valery Voronin	(Soviet Union) Torpedo Moscow	Soviet Union	4
13	Mário Coluna	(Portugal) Benfica	Portugal	3
14	Georgi Asparuhov	(Bulgaria) Levski Sofia	Bulgaria	2
14	Gordon Banks	(England) Leicester City	England	2
14	Geoff Hurst	(England) West Ham United	England	2
14	Sandro Mazzola	(Italy) Internazionale	Italy	2
18	Igor Chislenko	(Soviet Union) Dynamo Moscow	Soviet Union	1
18	Tony Dunne	(England) Manchester United	Republic of Ireland	1
18	Helmut Haller	(Italy) Bologna	West Germany	1
18	Denis Law	(England) Manchester United	Scotland	1
18	Willi Schulz	(Germany) Hamburger SV	West Germany	1
18	Paul Van Himst	(Belgium) Anderlecht	Belgium	1

Source: France Football
