= FIFA World Coach of the Year =

- First award: 2010
- Final award: 2015
- Website: FIFA.com
- Related: The Best FIFA Football Coach

The FIFA World Coach of the Year was an association football award given annually to the football coach who is considered to have performed the best in the previous 12 months. It was awarded based on votes from coaches and captains of international teams, as well as journalists from around the world.

The award started in 2010 after France Football's Ballon d'Or and the FIFA World Player of the Year award were merged. José Mourinho was the first winner of the men's FIFA World Coach of the Year award in 2010. The women's version of the award was won by head coach Silvia Neid in 2010. Starting in 2016 this award was replaced with the Best FIFA Football Coach Award.

== Winners ==
=== FIFA World Coach of the Year for Men's Football ===
Year	Rank	Name	Team(s) managed	Votes
2010	1st	(Portugal) José Mourinho	(Italy) Internazionale	35.92%
2010	2nd	(Spain) Vicente del Bosque	Spain	33.08%
2010	3rd	(Spain) Pep Guardiola	(Spain) Barcelona	8.45%
2011	1st	(Spain) Pep Guardiola	(Spain) Barcelona	41.90%
2011	2nd	(Scotland) Alex Ferguson	(England) Manchester United	15.59%
2011	3rd	(Portugal) José Mourinho	(Spain) Real Madrid	12.43%
2012	1st	(Spain) Vicente del Bosque	Spain	34.51%
2012	2nd	(Portugal) José Mourinho	(Spain) Real Madrid	20.49%
2012	3rd	(Spain) Pep Guardiola	(Spain) Barcelona	12.91%
2013	1st	(Germany) Jupp Heynckes	(Germany) Bayern Munich	37.30%
2013	2nd	(Germany) Jürgen Klopp	(Germany) Dortmund	15.77%
2013	3rd	(Scotland) Alex Ferguson	(England) Manchester United	14.55%
2014	1st	(Germany) Joachim Löw	Germany	36.23%
2014	2nd	(Italy) Carlo Ancelotti	(Spain) Real Madrid	22.06%
2014	3rd	(Argentina) Diego Simeone	(Spain) Atlético Madrid	19.02%
2015	1st	(Spain) Luis Enrique	(Spain) Barcelona	31.08%
2015	2nd	(Spain) Pep Guardiola	(Germany) Bayern Munich	22.97%
2015	3rd	(Argentina) Jorge Sampaoli	Chile	9.47%

==== Wins by manager ====
	Manager	First place	Second place	Third place	Teams managed
1	(Spain) Pep Guardiola	1	1	2	(Spain) FC Barcelona, (Germany) Bayern Munich
2	(Portugal) Jose Mourinho	1	1	1	(Italy) Internazionale, (Spain) Real Madrid
3	(Spain) Vicente del Bosque	1	1	0	Spain
4	(Germany) Jupp Heynckes	1	0	0	(Germany) Bayern Munich
5	(Germany) Joachim Löw	1	0	0	Germany
6	(Spain) Luis Enrique	1	0	0	(Spain) FC Barcelona
7	(Scotland) Alex Ferguson	0	1	1	(England) Manchester United
8	(Germany) Jürgen Klopp	0	1	0	(Germany) Dortmund
9	(Italy) Carlo Ancelotti	0	1	0	(Spain) Real Madrid
10	(Argentina) Diego Simeone	0	0	1	(Spain) Atletico Madrid
11	(Argentina) Jorge Sampaoli	0	0	1	Chile

=== FIFA World Coach of the Year for Women's Football ===
Year	1st	2nd	3rd
2010	Silvia Neid (Germany)	Maren Meinert (Germany U20)	(Sweden) Pia Sundhage (United States)
2011	Norio Sasaki (Japan)	(Sweden) Pia Sundhage (United States)	Bruno Bini (France)
2012	(Sweden) Pia Sundhage (United States)	Norio Sasaki (Japan)	Bruno Bini (France)
2013	Silvia Neid (Germany)	(Germany) Ralf Kellermann (Wolfsburg)	Pia Sundhage (Sweden)
2014	(Germany) Ralf Kellermann (Wolfsburg)	Maren Meinert (Germany U20)	Norio Sasaki (Japan)
2015	(England) Jill Ellis (United States)	Norio Sasaki (Japan)	(Wales) Mark Sampson (England)

==== Wins by manager ====
	Manager	First place	Second place	Third place	Teams managed
1	(Germany) Silvia Neid	2	0	0	Germany
2	(Japan) Norio Sasaki	1	2	1	Japan
3	(Sweden) Pia Sundhage	1	1	2	United States, Sweden
4	(Germany) Ralf Kellermann	1	1	0	(Germany) Wolfsburg
5	(United States) (England) Jill Ellis	1	0	0	United States
6	(Germany) Maren Meinert	0	2	0	Germany U20
7	(France) Bruno Bini	0	0	2	France
8	(Wales) Mark Sampson	0	0	1	England

== See also ==
- The Best FIFA Football Coach (2016–present)
- FIFA Ballon d'Or
- FIFA World Player of the Year
- FIFA Puskás Award
