= Ballon d'Or Dream Team =

Soccer team published by France Football in 2020

The Ballon d'Or Dream Team is an all-time all-star football team published by France Football on 14 December 2020, after conducting an internet poll of fans. The final team was selected by 140 France Football correspondents around the world. A second and a third team were also published.

== Nominations ==
The nominations were announced from 5 October 2020 through 19 October 2020. The winners were revealed on 14 December 2020 and lined up in a 3–4–3 formation. Brazil was the country with the highest number of nominated players (20 athletes), ahead of Italy (16), Germany (13), Netherlands (12), Spain (8), England and France (7).

=== Goalkeepers ===
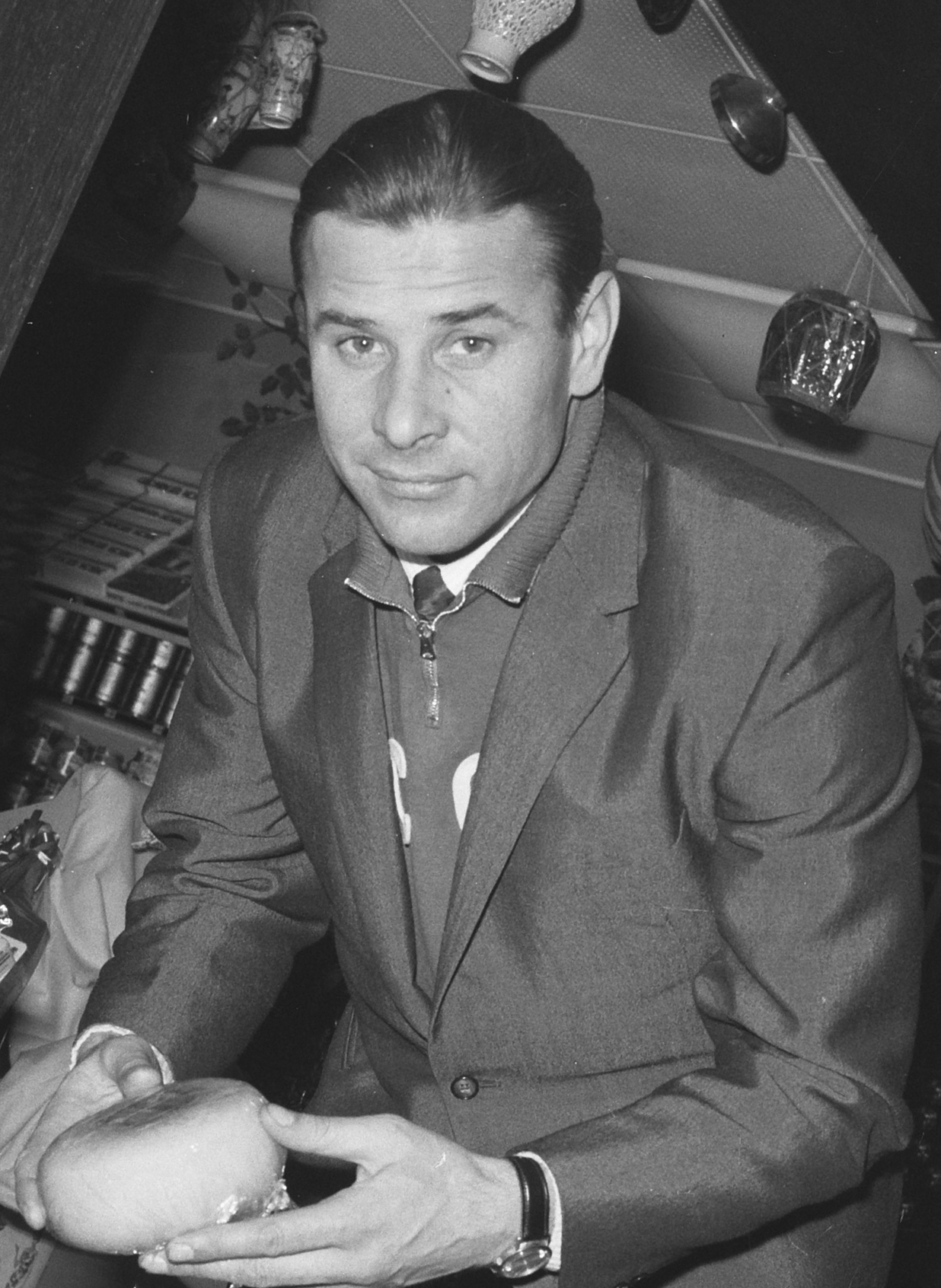
Lev Yashin, the only goalkeeper to ever win the Ballon d'Or

The nominations for the goalkeepers were announced on 5 October 2020.

Nationality	Player	Years	Club with most appearances	Best result at Ballon d'Or
(England)	Gordon Banks	1955–1978	(England) Leicester City (356)	7th in 1972
(Italy)	Gianluigi Buffon	1995–2023	(Italy) Juventus (674)	2nd in 2006
(Spain)	Iker Casillas	1999–2019	(Spain) Real Madrid (725)	4th in 2008
(Germany)	Sepp Maier	1962–1979	(Germany) Bayern Munich (651)	5th in 1975
(Germany)	Manuel Neuer	2005–present	(Germany) Bayern Munich (403)	3rd in 2014
(Cameroon)	Thomas N'Kono	1974–1997	(Spain) Espanyol (234)	Not eligible (Note: Up until 1995, the Ballon d'Or was only awarded to European players.)
(Denmark)	Peter Schmeichel	1981–2003	(England) Manchester United (398)	5th in 1992
(Netherlands)	Edwin van der Sar	1991–2011	(Netherlands) Ajax (312)	24th in 2008
(Soviet Union)	Lev Yashin	1950–1970	(Soviet Union) Dynamo Moscow (326)	Winner in 1963
(Italy)	Dino Zoff	1961–1983	(Italy) Juventus (479)	2nd in 1973

=== Right-backs ===
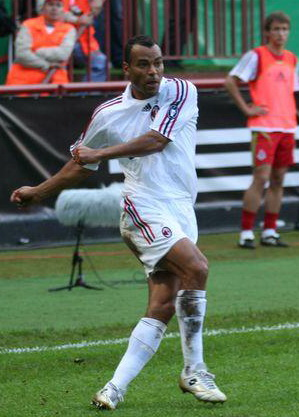
Cafu, the only footballer to have appeared in three consecutive FIFA World Cup finals

The nominations for the right-backs were announced on 5 October 2020.

Nationality	Player	Years	Club with most appearances	Best result at Ballon d'Or
(Italy)	Giuseppe Bergomi	1980–1999	(Italy) Inter Milan (757)	–
(Brazil)	Cafu	1989–2008	(Brazil) São Paulo (255)	15th in 2002
(Brazil)	Carlos Alberto	1963–1981	(Brazil) Santos (445)	Not eligible
(Brazil)	Djalma Santos	1948–1970	(Brazil) Palmeiras (498)	Not eligible
(Italy)	Claudio Gentile	1972–1988	(Italy) Juventus (417)	–
(Germany)	Manfred Kaltz	1971–1990	(Germany) Hamburger SV (724)	4th in 1979
(Germany)	Philipp Lahm	2002–2017	(Germany) Bayern Munich (517)	6th in 2014
(Netherlands)	Wim Suurbier	1964–1982	(Netherlands) Ajax (279)	–
(France)	Lilian Thuram	1991–2008	(Italy) Parma (228)	7th in 1998
(Germany)	Berti Vogts	1965–1979	(Germany) Borussia Mönchengladbach (528)	4th in 1975

=== Centre-backs ===
The nominations for the centre-backs were announced on 5 October 2020.

Nationality	Player	Years	Club with most appearances	Best result at Ballon d'Or
(Italy)	Franco Baresi	1978–1997	(Italy) Milan (719)	2nd in 1989
(Germany)	Franz Beckenbauer	1964–1983	(Germany) Bayern Munich (575)	Winner in 1972 and 1976
(Italy)	Fabio Cannavaro	1992–2011	(Italy) Parma (288)	Winner in 2006
(France)	Marcel Desailly	1986–2005	(England) Chelsea (222)	8th in 1996
(Netherlands)	Ronald Koeman	1980–1997	(Spain) Barcelona (264)	5th in 1988
(England)	Bobby Moore	1958–1978	(England) West Ham United (647)	2nd in 1970
(Argentina)	Daniel Passarella	1974–1989	(Argentina) River Plate (291)	Not eligible
(Spain)	Sergio Ramos	2004–present	(Spain) Real Madrid (660)	6th in 2017
(Germany)	Matthias Sammer	1985–1998	(Germany) Borussia Dortmund (153)	Winner in 1996
(Italy)	Gaetano Scirea	1972–1988	(Italy) Juventus (554)	12th in 1982

=== Left-backs ===
The nominations for the left-backs were announced on 5 October 2020.

Nationality	Player	Years	Club with most appearances	Best result at Ballon d'Or
(Germany)	Andreas Brehme	1980–1998	(Germany) 1. FC Kaiserslautern (237)	3rd in 1990
(Germany)	Paul Breitner	1970–1983	(Germany) Bayern Munich (347)	2nd in 1981
(Italy)	Antonio Cabrini	1975–1991	(Italy) Juventus (442)	13th in 1978
(Italy)	Giacinto Facchetti	1961–1978	(Italy) Inter Milan (639)	2nd in 1965
(Brazil)	Júnior	1974–1993	(Brazil) Flamengo (417)	Not eligible
(Netherlands)	Ruud Krol	1968–1986	(Netherlands) Ajax (457)	3rd in 1979
(Italy)	Paolo Maldini	1985–2009	(Italy) Milan (902)	3rd in 1994 and 2003
(Brazil)	Marcelo	2005–2024	(Spain) Real Madrid (514)	16th in 2017
(Brazil)	Nílton Santos	1948–1964	(Brazil) Botafogo (485)	Not eligible
(Brazil)	Roberto Carlos	1991–2012	(Spain) Real Madrid (527)	2nd in 2002

=== Defensive midfielders/Centre midfielders ===
The nominations for the defensive midfielders were announced on 12 October 2020.

Nationality	Player	Years	Club with most appearances	Best result at Ballon d'Or
(Hungary)	József Bozsik	1943–1962	(Hungary) Budapest Honvéd (447)	6th in 1956
(Spain)	Sergio Busquets	2007–2025	(Spain) Barcelona (591)	20th in 2012
(Brazil)	Didi	1946–1967	(Brazil) Fluminense (150)	Not eligible
(Brazil)	Paulo Roberto Falcão	1973–1986	(Brazil) Internacional (157)	Not eligible
(England)	Steven Gerrard	1998–2016	(England) Liverpool (710)	3rd in 2005
(Brazil)	Gérson	1959–1974	(Brazil) Botafogo (243)	Not eligible
(Spain)	Pep Guardiola	1988–2006	(Spain) Barcelona (382)	24th in 1994
(Czech Republic)	Josef Masopust	1950–1970	(Czech Republic) Dukla Prague (430)	Winner in 1962
(Germany)	Lothar Matthäus	1979–2000	(Germany) Bayern Munich (406)	Winner in 1990
(Netherlands)	Johan Neeskens	1968–1991	(Spain) Barcelona (181)	5th in 1974
(Italy)	Andrea Pirlo	1995–2017	(Italy) Milan (401)	5th in 2007
(Argentina)	Fernando Redondo	1985–2004	(Spain) Real Madrid (228)	18th in 2000
(Netherlands)	Frank Rijkaard	1980–1995	(Netherlands) Ajax (336)	3rd in 1988 and 1989
(Germany)	Bernd Schuster	1978–1997	(Spain) Barcelona (238)	2nd in 1980
(Netherlands)	Clarence Seedorf	1992–2014	(Italy) Milan (432)	17th in 1997
(Spain)	Luis Suárez	1951–1973	(Italy) Inter Milan (333)	Winner in 1960
(Italy)	Marco Tardelli	1972–1988	(Italy) Juventus (379)	15th in 1982
(France)	Jean Tigana	1975–1991	(France) Bordeaux (371)	2nd in 1984
(Spain)	Xabi Alonso	2000–2017	(Spain) Real Madrid (236)	10th in 2010
(Spain)	Xavi	1997–2019	(Spain) Barcelona (767)	3rd in 2009, 2010 and 2011

=== Attacking midfielders/Inside Forwards ===
The nominations for the offensive midfielders were announced on 12 October 2020.

Nationality	Player	Years	Club with most appearances	Best result at Ballon d'Or
(Italy)	Roberto Baggio	1983–2004	(Italy) Juventus (200)	Winner in 1993
(England)	Bobby Charlton	1956–1976	(England) Manchester United (758)	Winner in 1966
Argentina and Spain	Alfredo Di Stéfano	1945–1966	(Spain) Real Madrid (396)	Winner Super Ballon d'Or in 1989 Winner in 1957 and 1959
(Uruguay)	Enzo Francescoli	1980–1997	(Argentina) River Plate (233)	Not eligible
(Netherlands)	Ruud Gullit	1979–1998	(Italy) Milan (171)	Winner in 1987
(Romania)	Gheorghe Hagi	1982–2001	(Turkey) Galatasaray (192)	4th in 1994
(Spain)	Andrés Iniesta	2002–2024	(Spain) Barcelona (674)	2nd in 2010
(France)	Raymond Kopa	1949–1968	(France) Reims (463)	Winner in 1958
(Hungary)	László Kubala	1945–1967	(Spain) Barcelona (256)	5th in 1957
(Argentina)	Diego Maradona	1976–1997	(Italy) Napoli (259)	Winner of Ballon d'Or for services to football in 1995 Winner in 1986 and 1990
(Italy)	Sandro Mazzola	1961–1977	(Italy) Inter Milan (570)	2nd in 1971
(Brazil)	Pelé	1957–1977	(Brazil) Santos (656)	Winner of Ballon d'Or for services to football in 2013 Not eligible
(France)	Michel Platini	1973–1987	(Italy) Juventus (224)	Winner in 1983, 1984 and 1985
(Hungary)	Ferenc Puskás	1943–1966	(Hungary) Budapest Honvéd (358)	2nd in 1960
(Italy)	Gianni Rivera	1959–1979	(Italy) Milan (658)	Winner in 1969
(Uruguay)	Juan Alberto Schiaffino	1945–1962	(Uruguay) Peñarol (227)	Not eligible
(Brazil)	Sócrates	1974–1989	(Brazil) Corinthians (269)	Not eligible
(Italy)	Francesco Totti	1993–2017	(Italy) Roma (786)	5th in 2001
(Brazil)	Zico	1971–1994	(Brazil) Flamengo (505)	Not eligible
(France)	Zinedine Zidane	1989–2006	(Spain) Real Madrid (231)	Winner in 1998

=== Right wingers ===
The nominations for the right wingers were announced on 19 October 2020.

Nationality	Player	Years	Club with most appearances	Best result at Ballon d'Or
(England)	David Beckham	1992–2013	(England) Manchester United (394)	2nd in 1999
(Northern Ireland)	George Best	1963–1984	(England) Manchester United (473)	Winner in 1968
(Cameroon)	Samuel Eto'o	1997–2019	(Spain) Barcelona (199)	5th in 2009
(Portugal)	Luís Figo	1990–2009	(Spain) Barcelona (249)	Winner in 2000
(Brazil)	Garrincha	1953–1972	(Brazil) Botafogo (325)	Winner in 1962
(Brazil)	Jairzinho	1962–1983	(Brazil) Botafogo (413)	Not eligible
(England)	Kevin Keegan	1968–1984	(England) Liverpool (321)	Winner in 1978 and 1979
(England)	Stanley Matthews	1932–1965	(England) Blackpool (428)	Winner in 1956
(Argentina)	Lionel Messi	2003–present	(Spain) Barcelona (778)	Winner in 2009, 2010, 2011, 2012, 2015, 2019, 2021 and 2023
(Netherlands)	Arjen Robben	2000–2021	(Germany) Bayern Munich (309)	4th in 2014

=== Centre-forward ===
The nominations for the center-forward were announced on 19 October 2020.

Nationality	Player	Years	Club with most appearances	Best result at Ballon d'Or
(Netherlands)	Dennis Bergkamp	1986–2006	(England) Arsenal (423)	2nd in 1993
(Netherlands)	Johan Cruyff	1964–1984	(Netherlands) Ajax (367)	Winner in 1971, 1973 and 1974
(Scotland)	Kenny Dalglish	1969–1990	(England) Liverpool (502)	2nd in 1983
(Portugal)	Eusébio	1957–1978	(Portugal) Benfica (440)	Winner in 1965
(Hungary)	Sándor Kocsis	1946–1966	(Spain) Barcelona (265)	8th in 1956
(Germany)	Gerd Müller	1963–1982	(Germany) Bayern Munich (612)	Winner in 1970
(Brazil)	Romário	1985–2009	(Brazil) Vasco da Gama (350)	Winner in 1994
(Brazil)	Ronaldo	1993–2011	(Spain) Real Madrid (177)	Winner in 1997 and 2002
(Netherlands)	Marco van Basten	1981–1995	(Italy) Milan (201)	Winner in 1988, 1989 and 1992
(Liberia)	George Weah	1987–2001	(Italy) Milan (147)	Winner in 1995

=== Left wingers ===
The nominations for the left wingers were announced on 19 October 2020.

Nationality	Player	Years	Club with most appearances	Best result at Ballon d'Or
(Soviet Union)	Oleg Blokhin	1969–1990	(Soviet Union) Dynamo Kyiv (585)	Winner in 1975
(Portugal)	Cristiano Ronaldo	2002–present	(Spain) Real Madrid (438)	Winner in 2008, 2013, 2014, 2016 and 2017
(Socialist Federal Republic of Yugoslavia)	Dragan Džajić	1962–1978	(Socialist Federal Republic of Yugoslavia) Red Star Belgrade (615)	3rd in 1968
(Wales)	Ryan Giggs	1991–2014	(England) Manchester United (963)	9th in 1993
(France)	Thierry Henry	1994–2014	(England) Arsenal (377)	2nd in 2003
(Brazil)	Rivaldo	1989–2015	(Spain) Barcelona (235)	Winner in 1999
(Brazil)	Rivellino	1965–1981	(Brazil) Corinthians (474)	Not eligible
(Brazil)	Ronaldinho	1998–2015	(Spain) Barcelona (207)	Winner in 2005
(Germany)	Karl-Heinz Rummenigge	1974–1989	(Germany) Bayern Munich (422)	Winner in 1980 and 1981
(Bulgaria)	Hristo Stoichkov	1982–2003	(Spain) Barcelona (267)	Winner in 1994

== Selected teams ==
=== Second Team ===

Second Team

=== Third Team ===

Third Team

== See also ==
- Ballon d'Or
