= 2012 FIFA Ballon d'Or =

Third year for FIFA's awards

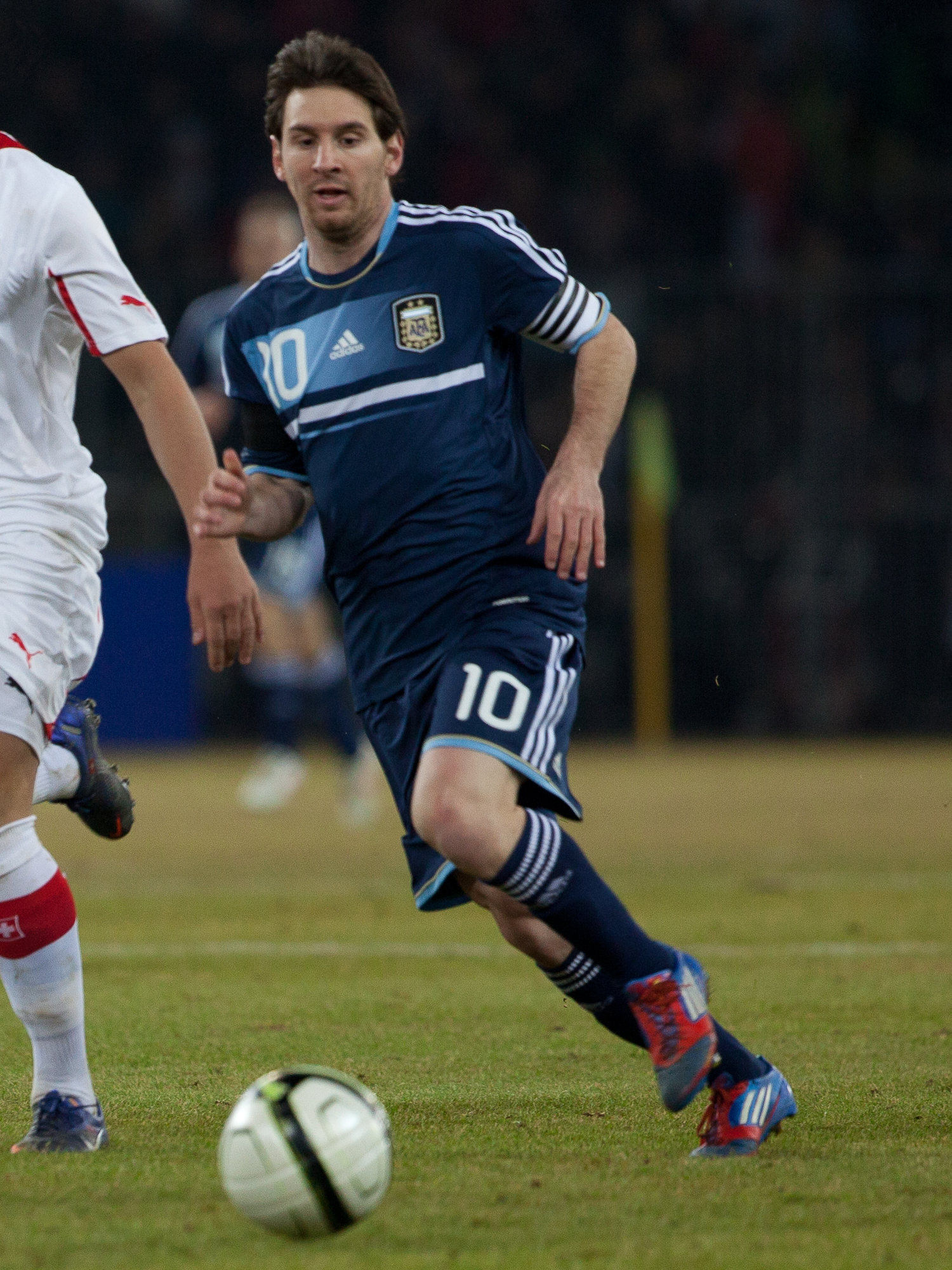
- 2012 FIFA Ballon d'Or Winner, Lionel Messi
- Date: 7 January 2013
- Location: Zürich, Switzerland
- Country: Switzerland
- Presented by: FIFA

Highlights
- Won by: (Argentina) Lionel Messi (4th Ballon d'Or)
- Website: ballondor.com

The 2012 FIFA Ballon d'Or (lit. '2012 FIFA Golden Ball'), was the third year for FIFA's awards for the top football players and coaches of the year. The awards were given out in Zürich on 7 January 2013, with Lionel Messi winning a record fourth consecutive Ballon d'Or.

The gala ceremony was hosted by former Ballon d'Or winner Ruud Gullit and broadcast journalist Kay Murray of Real Madrid TV and Fox Soccer.

== Winners and nominees ==
=== FIFA Ballon d'Or ===
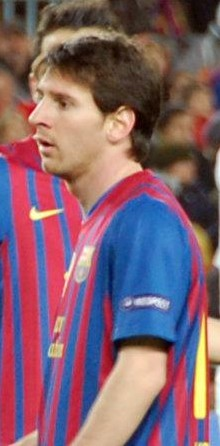
Lionel Messi

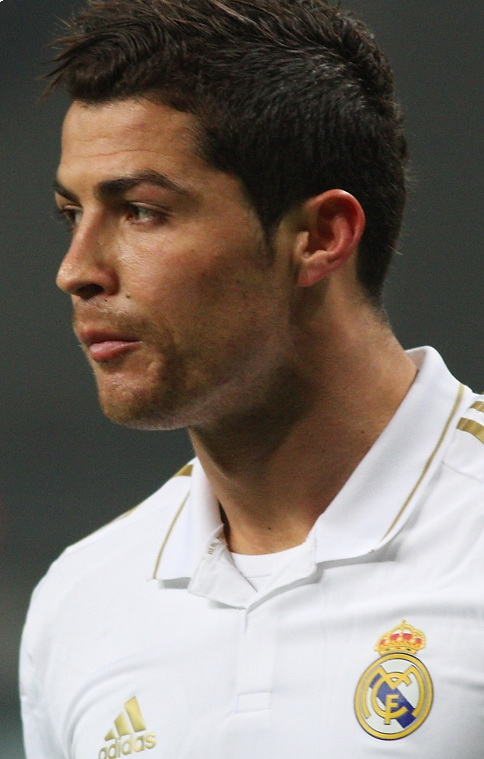
Cristiano Ronaldo

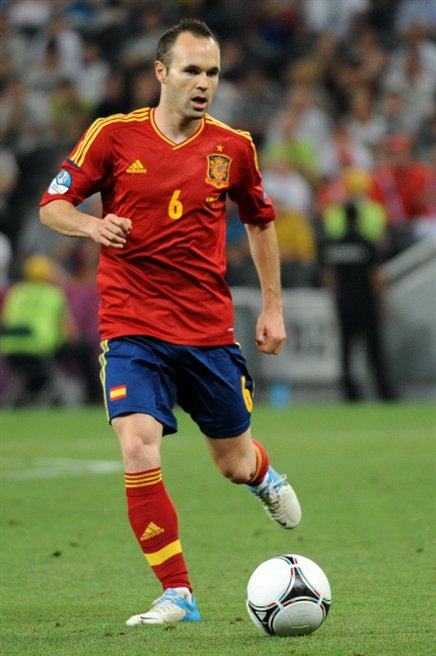
Andrés Iniesta

A shortlist of 23 male players was compiled by members of FIFA's Football Committee as well as a group of experts from France Football. It was announced on 29 October 2012. There were three voters per FIFA member federation, one journalist and the coaches and captain of the national men's team. Each picked a first (5 points), second (3 points) and third choice (1 point), with their choices made public by FIFA. This was cut to a set of three "finalists" – Lionel Messi, Andrés Iniesta and Cristiano Ronaldo – on 29 November 2012.

The odds-on favourite Lionel Messi won the award. Messi won all three FIFA Ballons d'Or since its inception in 2010 and also won both predecessor awards (the Ballon d'Or and FIFA World Player of the Year) in 2009.

The results for the 2012 FIFA Ballon d'Or were:

Rank	Player	National team	Club(s)	Percent
1st	Lionel Messi	Argentina	(Spain) Barcelona	41.60%
2nd	Cristiano Ronaldo	Portugal	(Spain) Real Madrid	23.68%
3rd	Andrés Iniesta	Spain	(Spain) Barcelona	10.91%

The following twenty players were also in contention for the award:

Rank	Player	National team	Club(s)	Percent
4th	Xavi	Spain	(Spain) Barcelona	4.08%
5th	Radamel Falcao	Colombia	(Spain) Atlético Madrid	3.67%
6th	Iker Casillas	Spain	(Spain) Real Madrid	3.18%
7th	Andrea Pirlo	Italy	(Italy) Juventus	2.66%
8th	Didier Drogba	Ivory Coast	(England) Chelsea (China) Shanghai Shenhua	2.60%
9th	Robin van Persie	Netherlands	(England) Arsenal (England) Manchester United	1.45%
10th	Zlatan Ibrahimović	Sweden	(Italy) Milan (France) Paris Saint-Germain	1.24%
11th	Xabi Alonso	Spain	(Spain) Real Madrid	1.09%
12th	Yaya Touré	Ivory Coast	(England) Manchester City	0.76%
13th	Neymar	Brazil	(Brazil) Santos	0.61%
14th	Mesut Özil	Germany	(Spain) Real Madrid	0.41%
15th	Wayne Rooney	England	(England) Manchester United	0.39%
16th	Gianluigi Buffon	Italy	(Italy) Juventus	0.35%
17th	Sergio Agüero	Argentina	(England) Manchester City	0.30%
18th	Sergio Ramos	Spain	(Spain) Real Madrid	0.22%
19th	Manuel Neuer	Germany	(Germany) Bayern Munich	0.21%
20th	Sergio Busquets	Spain	(Spain) Barcelona	0.20%
21st	Gerard Piqué	Spain	(Spain) Barcelona	0.11%
22nd	Karim Benzema	France	(Spain) Real Madrid	0.11%
23rd	Mario Balotelli	Italy	(England) Manchester City	0.07%

=== FIFA Women's World Player of the Year ===
On 25 October 2012, a ten-player shortlist was unveiled for the FIFA's Women's Player of the Year, which was chosen by experts from FIFA's Committee for Women's Football and the FIFA Women's World Cup and a group of experts from France Football.

The voting system used was the same as that of the men's award (see above), with coaches and captains of women's national teams and persons from the media making public top-three selections.

Rank	Player	National team	Club(s)	Percent
1st	Abby Wambach	United States	w/o club	20.67%
2nd	Marta	Brazil	(Sweden) Tyresö FF	13.50%
3rd	Alex Morgan	United States	(United States) Seattle Sounders	10.87%

Rank	Player	National team	Club(s)	Percent
4th	Homare Sawa	Japan	(Japan) INAC Kobe Leonessa	10.85%
5th	Christine Sinclair	Canada	(United States) Western New York Flash	10.33%
6th	Carli Lloyd	United States	w/o club	7.99%
7th	Camille Abily	France	(France) Lyon	7.70%
8th	Aya Miyama	Japan	(Japan) Yunogo Belle	7.51%
9th	Miho Fukumoto	Japan	(Japan) Yunogo Belle	7.32%
10th	Megan Rapinoe	United States	(United States) Seattle Sounders	2.89%

=== FIFA World Coach of the Year for Men's Football ===
This award was decided by the same voters and system as that of the men's player award.

Rank	Coach	Nationality	Team(s)	Percent
1st	Vicente del Bosque	Spain	Spain	34.51%
2nd	José Mourinho	Portugal	(Spain) Real Madrid	20.49%
3rd	Pep Guardiola	Spain	(Spain) Barcelona	12.91%

Rank	Coach	Nationality	Team(s)	Percent
4th	Roberto Di Matteo	Italy	(England) Chelsea	12.02%
5th	Alex Ferguson	Scotland	(England) Manchester United	5.82%
6th	Jürgen Klopp	Germany	(Germany) Borussia Dortmund	4.78%
7th	Cesare Prandelli	Italy	Italy	3.34%
8th	Roberto Mancini	Italy	(England) Manchester City	3.10%
9th	Joachim Löw	Germany	Germany	1.15%
10th	Jupp Heynckes	Germany	(Germany) Bayern Munich	1.00%

=== FIFA World Coach of the Year for Women's Football ===
This award was decided by the same voters and system as that of the women's player award.

Rank	Coach	Nationality	Team(s)	Percent
1st	Pia Sundhage	Sweden	United States	28.59%
2nd	Norio Sasaki	Japan	Japan	23.83%
3rd	Bruno Bini	France	France	9.02%

Rank	Coach	Nationality	Team(s)	Percent
4th	Patrice Lair	France	(France) Lyon	7.64%
5th	Silvia Neid	Germany	Germany	6.48%
6th	John Herdman	England	Canada	6.31%
7th	Hiroshi Yoshida	Japan	Japan U17; Japan U20	5.75%
8th	Steve Swanson	United States	United States U20	5.02%
9th	Maren Meinert	Germany	Germany U20	3.70%
10th	Hope Powell	England	England; Great Britain Olympic	3.29%

=== FIFA/FIFPro World XI ===

FIFA/FIFPro World XI 2012

Position	Player	National team	Club(s)
GK	Iker Casillas	Spain	(Spain) Real Madrid
DF	Dani Alves	Brazil	(Spain) Barcelona
DF	Sergio Ramos	Spain	(Spain) Real Madrid
DF	Gerard Piqué	Spain	(Spain) Barcelona
DF	Marcelo	Brazil	(Spain) Real Madrid
MF	Xavi	Spain	(Spain) Barcelona
MF	Xabi Alonso	Spain	(Spain) Real Madrid
MF	Andrés Iniesta	Spain	(Spain) Barcelona
FW	Lionel Messi	Argentina	(Spain) Barcelona
FW	Radamel Falcao	Colombia	(Spain) Atlético Madrid
FW	Cristiano Ronaldo	Portugal	(Spain) Real Madrid

This was the first occasion that all eleven FIFPro World XI players were players from the same league (La Liga).

=== FIFA Puskás Award ===
The Puskás Award for best goal was decided by a public online vote.

Rank	Player	Nationality	Team	Percent	Notes
1st	Miroslav Stoch	Slovakia	(Turkey) Fenerbahçe	78%	Volley into top corner of net, 3 March 2012, Turkish Süper Lig match against Gençlerbirliği
2nd	Radamel Falcao	Colombia	(Spain) Atlético Madrid	15%	
3rd	Neymar	Brazil	(Brazil) Santos	7%	

=== FIFA Presidential Award ===
- (Germany) Franz Beckenbauer

=== FIFA Fair Play Award ===
- Uzbekistan Football Federation
