= FIFA Ballon d'Or =

Award for association football players

- FIFA Ballon d'Or awarded to Messi in 2010
- Sport: Association football
- Awarded for: Best performing player of the calendar year

History
- First award: 2010
- Editions: 6
- Final award: 2015
- Most wins: (Argentina) Lionel Messi (4 awards)

The FIFA Ballon d'Or ("Golden Ball") was an annual association football award presented to the world's best men's player from 2010 to 2015. Awarded jointly by FIFA and France Football, the prize was a merger of the FIFA World Player of the Year award and the Ballon d'Or, the two most prestigious individual honours in world football. Unlike the Ballon d'Or awarded by France Football, the FIFA Ballon d'Or, was not awarded solely based on votes from international journalists, but votes from national team coaches and captains also, who selected the players they deemed to have performed the best in the previous calendar year.

The six editions of the FIFA Ballon d'Or were dominated by Lionel Messi and Cristiano Ronaldo, as part of their ongoing rivalry.

Messi, who played for Barcelona, won the inaugural Ballon d'Or in 2010 and went on to win three in a row, after his wins in 2011 and 2012. Ronaldo, who played for Real Madrid, won successive awards in the next two years. The final FIFA Ballon d'Or was presented to Messi in 2015. Its awarding bodies subsequently ended their partnership; for 2016, France Football reintroduced the previous format of the Ballon d'Or, while FIFA created The Best FIFA Men's Player award.

== History ==
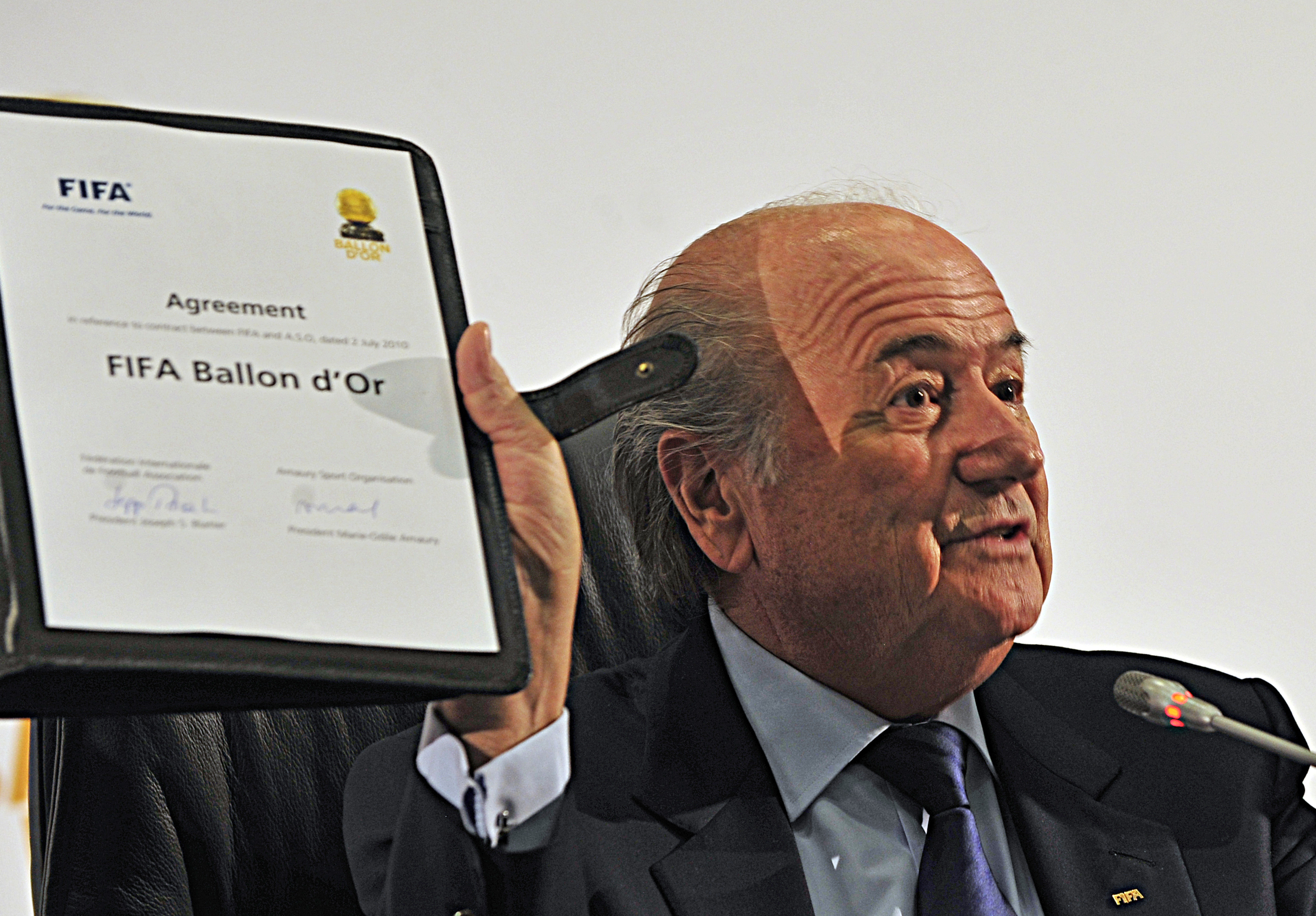
FIFA President Sepp Blatter holds up the agreement creating the FIFA Ballon d'Or in Johannesburg in July 2010.

Historically, the leading individual awards in association football were the Ballon d'Or and the FIFA World Player of the Year award. The original Ballon d'Or, also known as the European Footballer of the Year award, had been awarded by the French publication France Football since 1956. The FIFA World Player of the Year award was presented by FIFA, the sport's governing body, from 1991.

From 2005, the winners of the Ballon d'Or and FIFA World Player of the Year award were identical each year. Following the introduction of a global Ballon d'Or format in 2007, France Football and FIFA opted to merge the two awards. The creation of the FIFA Ballon d'Or was subsequently announced during the 2010 FIFA World Cup in South Africa. The inaugural award was presented that same year to the Argentine Lionel Messi.

After a six-year partnership, France Football and FIFA terminated the joint award. Lionel Messi had received the final FIFA Ballon d'Or. For historical purposes, both awarding bodies regard the six editions of the FIFA Ballon d'Or as a continuation of their respective awards.

=== Voting ===
The winners of the FIFA Ballon d'Or were chosen by international journalists and the coaches and captains of the national teams under FIFA's jurisdiction. In a system based on positional voting, each voter was allotted three votes, worth five points, three points and one point, and the three finalists were ordered based on total number of points. Voters were provided with a shortlist of 23 players from which they could select the three players they deemed to have performed the best in the previous calendar year.

== Winners ==
Year	Rank	Player	Team	Votes
2010	1st	(Argentina) Lionel Messi	(Spain) Barcelona	22.65%
2010	2nd	(Spain) Andrés Iniesta	(Spain) Barcelona	17.36%
2010	3rd	(Spain) Xavi	(Spain) Barcelona	16.48%
2011	1st	(Argentina) Lionel Messi	(Spain) Barcelona	47.88%
2011	2nd	(Portugal) Cristiano Ronaldo	(Spain) Real Madrid	21.60%
2011	3rd	(Spain) Xavi	(Spain) Barcelona	9.23%
2012	1st	(Argentina) Lionel Messi	(Spain) Barcelona	41.60%
2012	2nd	(Portugal) Cristiano Ronaldo	(Spain) Real Madrid	23.68%
2012	3rd	(Spain) Andrés Iniesta	(Spain) Barcelona	10.91%
2013	1st	(Portugal) Cristiano Ronaldo	(Spain) Real Madrid	27.99%
2013	2nd	(Argentina) Lionel Messi	(Spain) Barcelona	24.72%
2013	3rd	(France) Franck Ribéry	(Germany) Bayern Munich	23.36%
2014	1st	(Portugal) Cristiano Ronaldo	(Spain) Real Madrid	37.66%
2014	2nd	(Argentina) Lionel Messi	(Spain) Barcelona	15.76%
2014	3rd	(Germany) Manuel Neuer	(Germany) Bayern Munich	15.72%
2015	1st	(Argentina) Lionel Messi	(Spain) Barcelona	41.33%
2015	2nd	(Portugal) Cristiano Ronaldo	(Spain) Real Madrid	27.76%
2015	3rd	(Brazil) Neymar	(Spain) Barcelona	7.86%

=== Wins by player ===
#	Player	Winner	Runner-up	Third place
1	(Argentina) Lionel Messi (Note: FIFA and France Football credit Messi, the recipient of the 2009 Ballon d'Or and FIFA World Player of the Year award, with eight Ballons d'Or in total (2009–12, 2015, 2019, 2021, 2023). Messi additionally placed as a finalist for both awards in 2007 and 2008.)	4 (2010, 2011, 2012, 2015)	2 (2013, 2014)	—
2	(Portugal) Cristiano Ronaldo (Note: FIFA and France Football credit Ronaldo, the recipient of the 2008 Ballon d'Or and FIFA World Player of the Year award, with five Ballons d'Or in total (2008, 2013–14, 2016–17). Ronaldo additionally placed as a finalist for both awards in 2007 and 2009.)	2 (2013, 2014)	3 (2011, 2012, 2015)	—
3	(Spain) Andrés Iniesta	—	1 (2010)	1 (2012)
4	(Spain) Xavi (Note: Xavi additionally placed in third place for the 2009 Ballon d'Or and FIFA World Player of the Year award.)	—	—	2 (2010, 2011)
5	(France) Franck Ribéry	—	—	1 (2013)
5	(Germany) Manuel Neuer	—	—	1 (2014)
5	(Brazil) Neymar	—	—	1 (2015)

=== Wins by country ===
#	Country	Winner	Runner-up	Third place
1	Argentina	4 (2010, 2011, 2012, 2015)	2 (2013, 2014)	—
2	Portugal	2 (2013, 2014)	3 (2011, 2012, 2015)	—
3	Spain	—	1 (2010)	3 (2010, 2011, 2012)
4	France	—	—	1 (2013)
4	Germany	—	—	1 (2014)
4	Brazil	—	—	1 (2015)

=== Wins by club ===
#	Club	Winner	Runner-up	Third place
1	(Spain) Barcelona	4 (2010, 2011, 2012, 2015)	3 (2010, 2013, 2014)	4 (2010, 2011, 2012, 2015)
2	(Spain) Real Madrid	2 (2013, 2014)	3 (2011, 2012, 2015)	—
3	(Germany) Bayern Munich	—	—	2 (2013, 2014)

== FIFA Ballon d'Or Prix d'Honneur ==
In 2013, Brazilian forward Pelé was given an honorary Ballon d'Or, having won three FIFA World Cups with Brazil but never an individual award from FIFA, as during his playing career only Europe-based players were eligible to win the original Ballon d'Or.

== See also ==
- Ballon d'Or
- FIFA World Player of the Year
- The Best FIFA Football Awards
- FIFA FIFPRO World 11
