= 2014 FIFA Ballon d'Or =

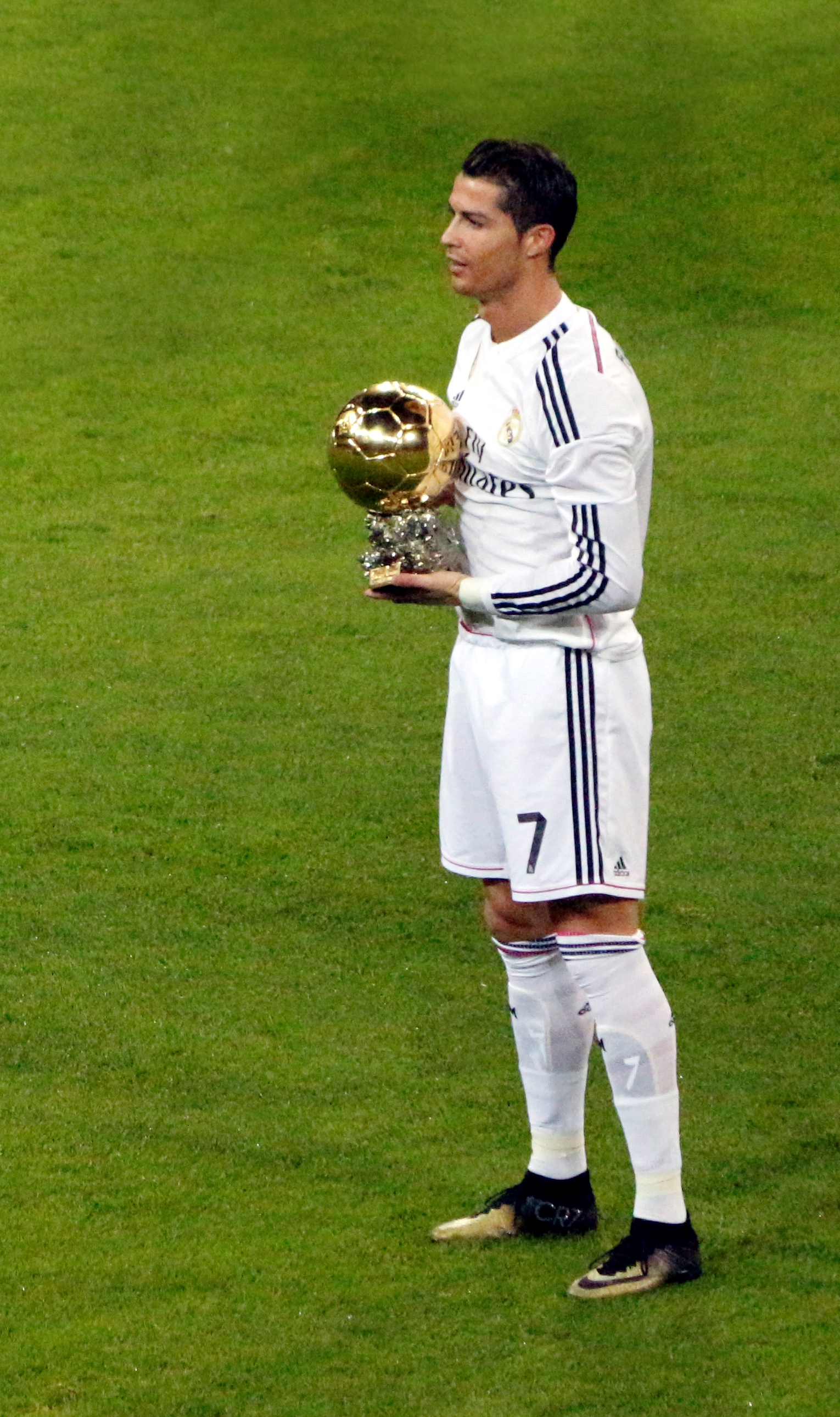
- 2014 FIFA Ballon d'Or winner, Cristiano Ronaldo
- Date: 12 January 2015
- Location: Zürich, Switzerland
- Country: Switzerland
- Presented by: FIFA

Highlights
- Won by: (Portugal) Cristiano Ronaldo (3rd Ballon d'Or)
- Website: ballondor.com

The 2014 FIFA Ballon d'Or (lit. '2014 FIFA Golden Ball'), was the fifth year for FIFA's awards for the top football players and coaches of the year. The awards were given out in Zürich on 12 January 2015.

Real Madrid and Portugal forward Cristiano Ronaldo won the FIFA Ballon d'Or as the World Player of the Year for a second consecutive time, having won it previously last year. This was his third Ballon d'Or win overall, placing him second to only Lionel Messi for the most wins in the history of the award. Nadine Keßler was named as the Women's World Player of the Year, while Joachim Löw received the World Coach of the Year for Men's Football and Ralf Kellermann the World Coach of the Year for Women's Football. The ceremony was hosted by Kate Abdo.

== Winners and nominees ==
In late October 2014, the FIFA revealed shortlists for the FIFA Ballon d'Or, FIFA Women's World Player of the Year, and FIFA World Coaches of the Year. The shortlists for the women's awards were revealed on 24 October, and the men's shortlists were revealed on 28 October.

=== FIFA Ballon d'Or ===
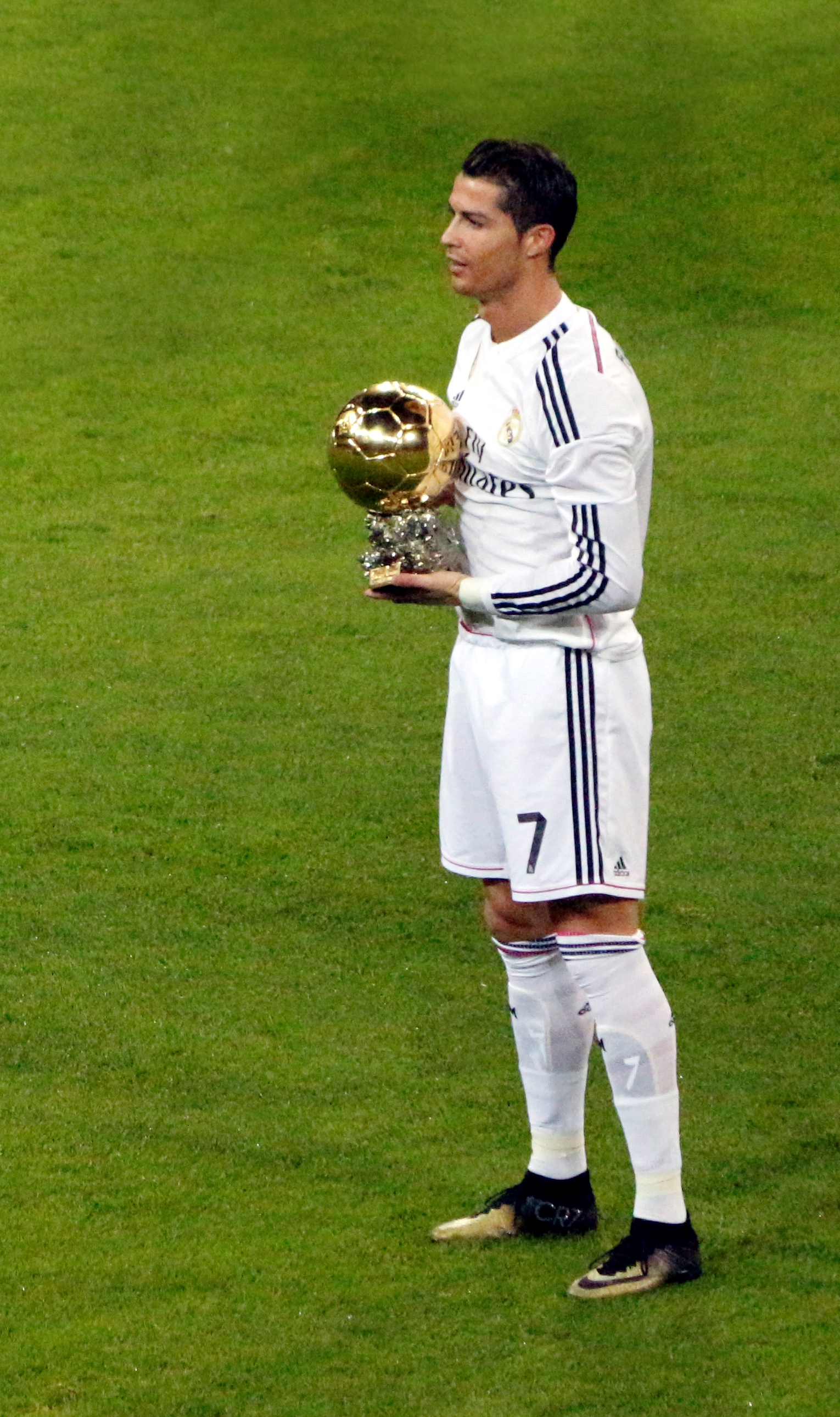
Cristiano Ronaldo presenting his second FIFA Ballon d'Or to fans at the Santiago Bernabéu in January 2015

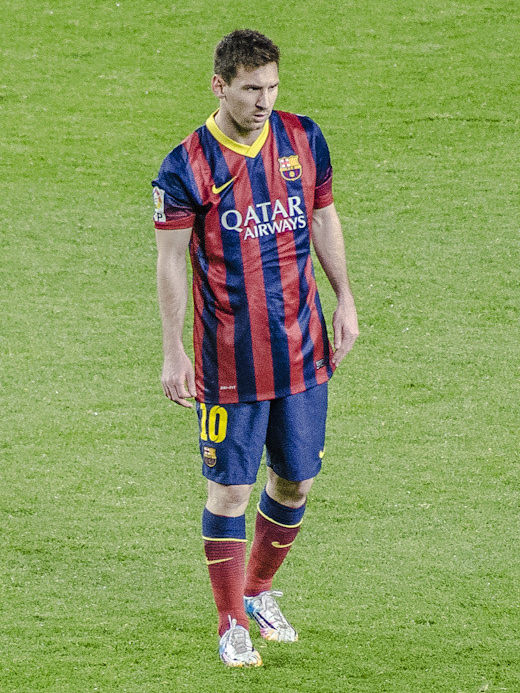
Lionel Messi

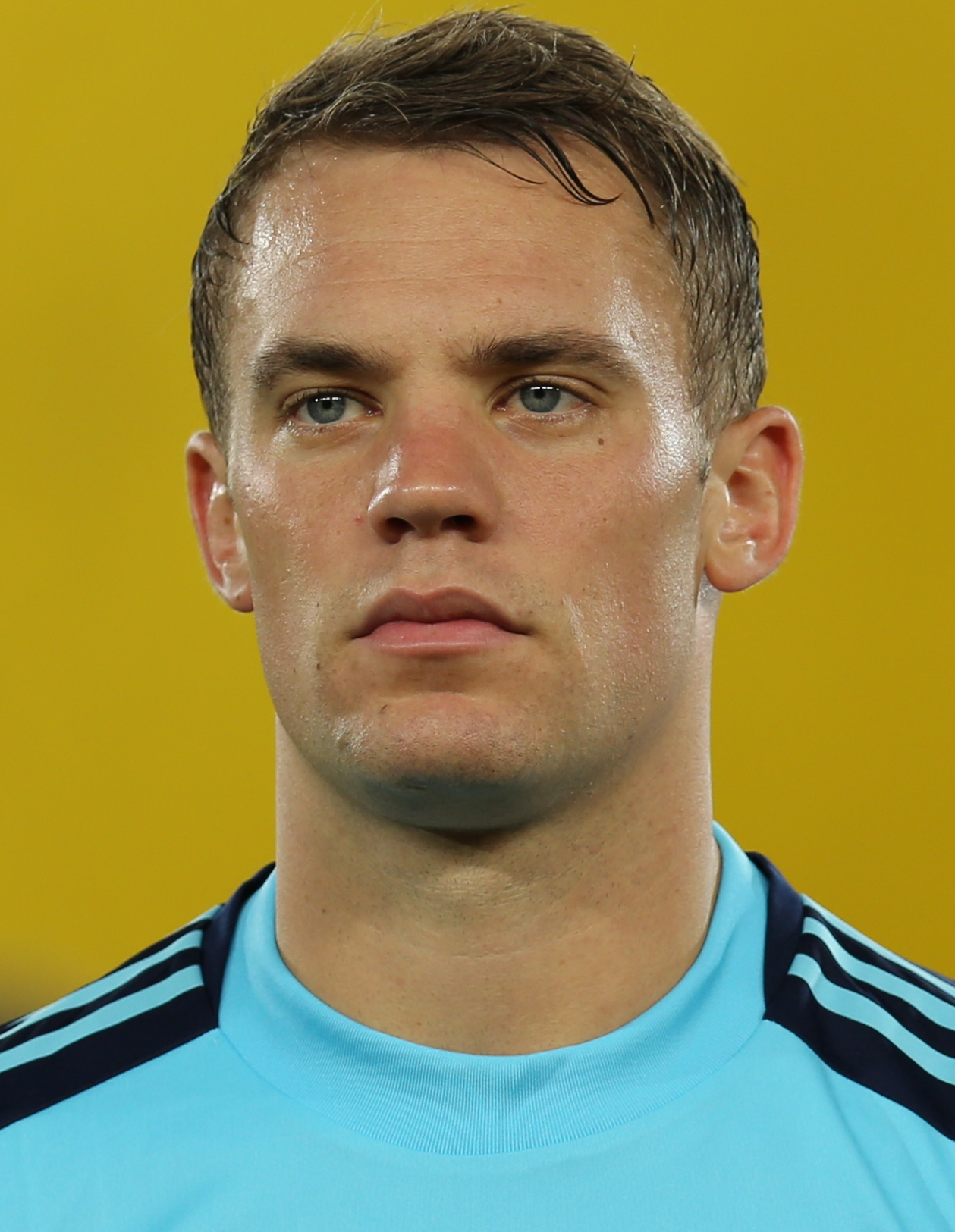
Manuel Neuer

The results for the 2014 FIFA Ballon d'Or were:

Rank	Player	National team	Club(s)	Percent
1	Cristiano Ronaldo	Portugal	(Spain) Real Madrid	37.66%
2	Lionel Messi	Argentina	(Spain) Barcelona	15.76%
3	Manuel Neuer	Germany	(Germany) Bayern Munich	15.72%

The following twenty players were also in contention for the award:

Rank	Player	National team	Club(s)	Percent
4	Arjen Robben	Netherlands	(Germany) Bayern Munich	7.17%
5	Thomas Müller	Germany	(Germany) Bayern Munich	5.42%
6	Philipp Lahm	Germany	(Germany) Bayern Munich	2.90%
7	Neymar	Brazil	(Spain) Barcelona	2.21%
8	James Rodríguez	Colombia	(France) Monaco (Spain) Real Madrid	1.47%
9	Toni Kroos	Germany	(Germany) Bayern Munich (Spain) Real Madrid	1.43%
10	Ángel Di María	Argentina	(Spain) Real Madrid (England) Manchester United	1.29%
11	Diego Costa	Spain	(Spain) Atlético Madrid (England) Chelsea	1.02%
12	Gareth Bale	Wales	(Spain) Real Madrid	1.00%
13	Zlatan Ibrahimović	Sweden	(France) Paris Saint-Germain	1.00%
14	Yaya Touré	Ivory Coast	(England) Manchester City	0.86%
15	Mario Götze	Germany	(Germany) Bayern Munich	0.84%
16	Karim Benzema	France	(Spain) Real Madrid	0.75%
17	Andrés Iniesta	Spain	(Spain) Barcelona	0.67%
18	Bastian Schweinsteiger	Germany	(Germany) Bayern Munich	0.57%
19	Javier Mascherano	Argentina	(Spain) Barcelona	0.55%
20	Thibaut Courtois	Belgium	(Spain) Atlético Madrid (England) Chelsea	0.51%
21	Eden Hazard	Belgium	(England) Chelsea	0.47%
22	Paul Pogba	France	(Italy) Juventus	0.40%
23	Sergio Ramos	Spain	(Spain) Real Madrid	0.33%

=== FIFA Puskás Award ===
External videos
- James Rodriguez Goal: WINNER FIFA Puskas Award 2014 on YouTube
- James Rodriguez: FIFA Puskas Award Reaction on YouTube

- (Colombia) James Rodríguez, 1–0 vs Uruguay, Maracanã Stadium, 28 June 2014

=== FIFA Presidential Award ===
- (Japan) Hiroshi Kagawa, former Japanese footballer and current sports journalist.

=== FIFA Fair Play Award ===
- 2014 FIFA World Cup volunteers

=== FIFA/FIFPro World XI ===

FIFA/FIFPro World XI 2014

Position	Player	National team	Club(s)
GK	Manuel Neuer	Germany	(Germany) Bayern Munich
DF	Sergio Ramos	Spain	(Spain) Real Madrid
DF	David Luiz	Brazil	(England) Chelsea (France) Paris Saint-Germain
DF	Thiago Silva	Brazil	(France) Paris Saint-Germain
DF	Philipp Lahm	Germany	(Germany) Bayern Munich
MF	Andrés Iniesta	Spain	(Spain) Barcelona
MF	Toni Kroos	Germany	(Germany) Bayern Munich (Spain) Real Madrid
MF	Ángel Di María	Argentina	(Spain) Real Madrid (England) Manchester United
FW	Arjen Robben	Netherlands	(Germany) Bayern Munich
FW	Lionel Messi	Argentina	(Spain) Barcelona
FW	Cristiano Ronaldo	Portugal	(Spain) Real Madrid

=== FIFA Women's World Player of the Year ===
The following ten players were named to the shortlist for the FIFA Women's World Player of the Year award:

Rank	Player	National team	Club(s)	Percent
1	Nadine Keßler	Germany	(Germany) VfL Wolfsburg	17.52%
2	Marta	Brazil	(Sweden) Tyresö FF (Sweden) FC Rosengård	14.16%
3	Abby Wambach	United States	(United States) Western New York Flash	13.33%
4	Nadine Angerer	Germany	(United States) Portland Thorns (Australia) Brisbane Roar	13.16%
5	Aya Miyama	Japan	(Japan) Okayama Yunogo Belle	10.48%
6	Louisa Necib	France	(France) Lyon	7.18%
7	Nahomi Kawasumi	Japan	(United States) Seattle Reign (Japan) INAC Kobe Leonessa	6.51%
8	Verónica Boquete	Spain	(United States) Portland Thorns (Germany) 1. FFC Frankfurt	6.15%
9	Lotta Schelin	Sweden	(France) Lyon	6.06%
10	Nilla Fischer	Sweden	(Germany) VfL Wolfsburg	5.45%

=== FIFA World Coach of the Year for Men's Football ===
The following ten managers were named to the shortlist for the FIFA World Coach of the Year for Men's Football:

Rank	Coach	Nationality	Team(s)	Percent
1	Joachim Löw	Germany	Germany	36.23%
2	Carlo Ancelotti	Italy	(Spain) Real Madrid	22.06%
3	Diego Simeone	Argentina	(Spain) Atlético Madrid	19.02%
4	Pep Guardiola	Spain	(Germany) Bayern Munich	8.67%
5	José Mourinho	Portugal	(England) Chelsea	6.16%
6	Louis van Gaal	Netherlands	Netherlands (England) Manchester United	3.15%
7	Alejandro Sabella	Argentina	Argentina	2.21%
8	Antonio Conte	Italy	Juventus; Italy	1.12%
9	Jürgen Klinsmann	Germany	United States	0.71%
10	Manuel Pellegrini	Chile	(England) Manchester City	0.67%

=== FIFA World Coach of the Year for Women's Football ===
The following ten managers were named to the shortlist for the FIFA World Coach of the Year for Women's Football:

Rank	Coach	Nationality	Team(s)	Percent
1	Ralf Kellermann	Germany	(Germany) VfL Wolfsburg	17.06%
2	Maren Meinert	Germany	Germany U20	13.16%
3	Norio Sasaki	Japan	Japan	13.06%
4	Pia Sundhage	Sweden	Sweden	11.22%
5	Philippe Bergeroo	France	France	9.81%
6	Peter Dedevbo	Nigeria	Nigeria U20	9.62%
7	Martina Voss-Tecklenburg	Germany	Switzerland	9.45%
8	Asako Takemoto	Japan	Japan U17	8.47%
9	Jorge Vilda	Spain	Spain U17; Spain U19	4.17%
10	Laura Harvey	England	(United States) Seattle Reign	3.98%
