= 2011 FIFA Ballon d'Or =

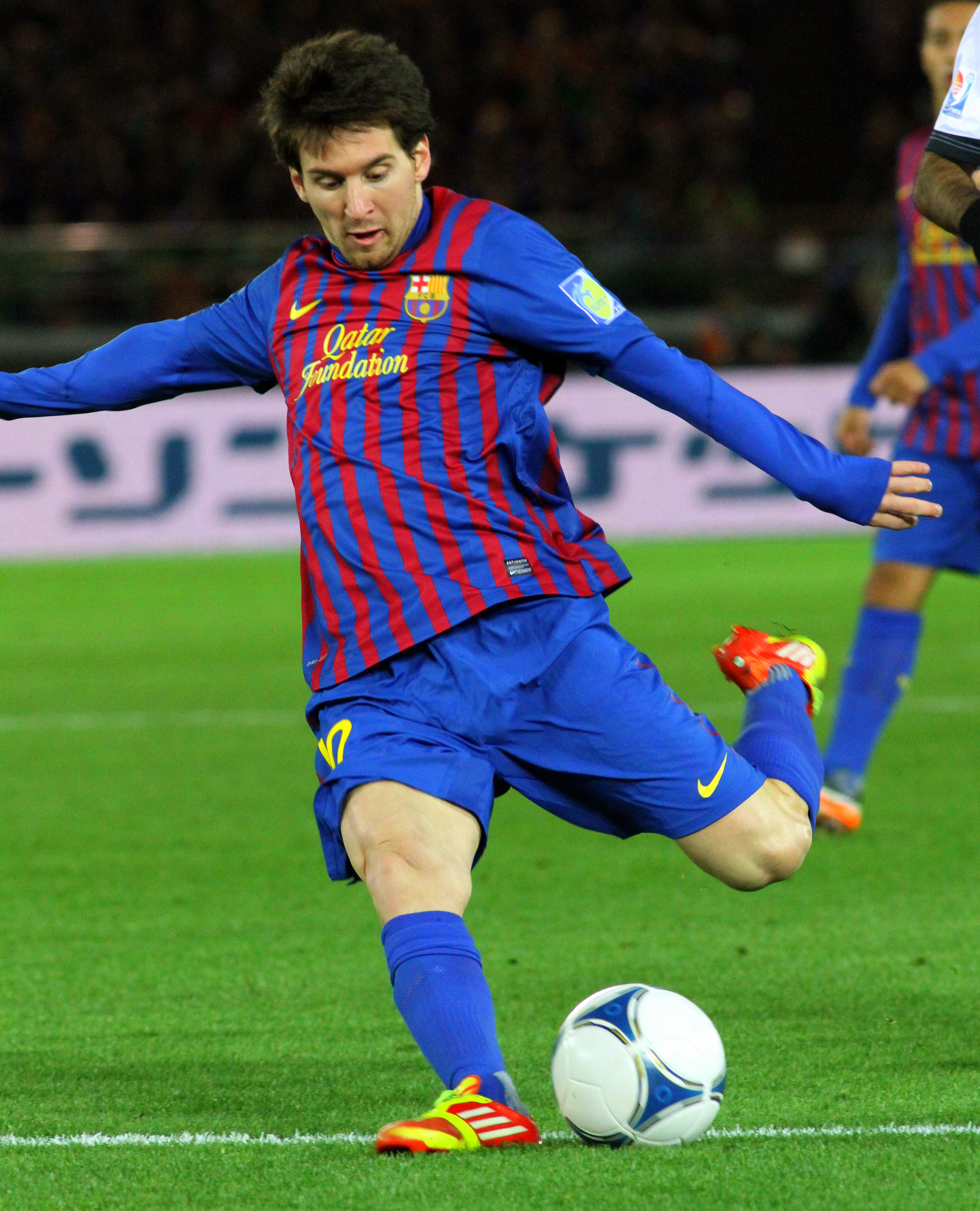
- 2011 FIFA Ballon d'Or winner, Lionel Messi
- Date: 9 January 2012
- Location: Zürich, Switzerland
- Country: Switzerland
- Presented by: FIFA

Highlights
- Won by: (Argentina) Lionel Messi (3rd Ballon d'Or)
- Website: ballondor.com

The 2011 FIFA Ballon d'Or (lit. '2011 FIFA Golden Ball'), was the second year for FIFA's awards for the top football players and coaches of the year. The awards were given out in Zürich on 9 January 2012, with Lionel Messi claiming the title of world player of the year for the third time in a row.

The gala ceremony was hosted by former Ballon d'Or winner Ruud Gullit and broadcast journalist Kay Murray of Real Madrid TV and Fox Soccer Channel, with singer-songwriter James Blunt and his band providing musical entertainment.

== Winners and nominees ==
=== FIFA Ballon d'Or ===
The top three nominees for the 2011 FIFA Ballon d'Or were:

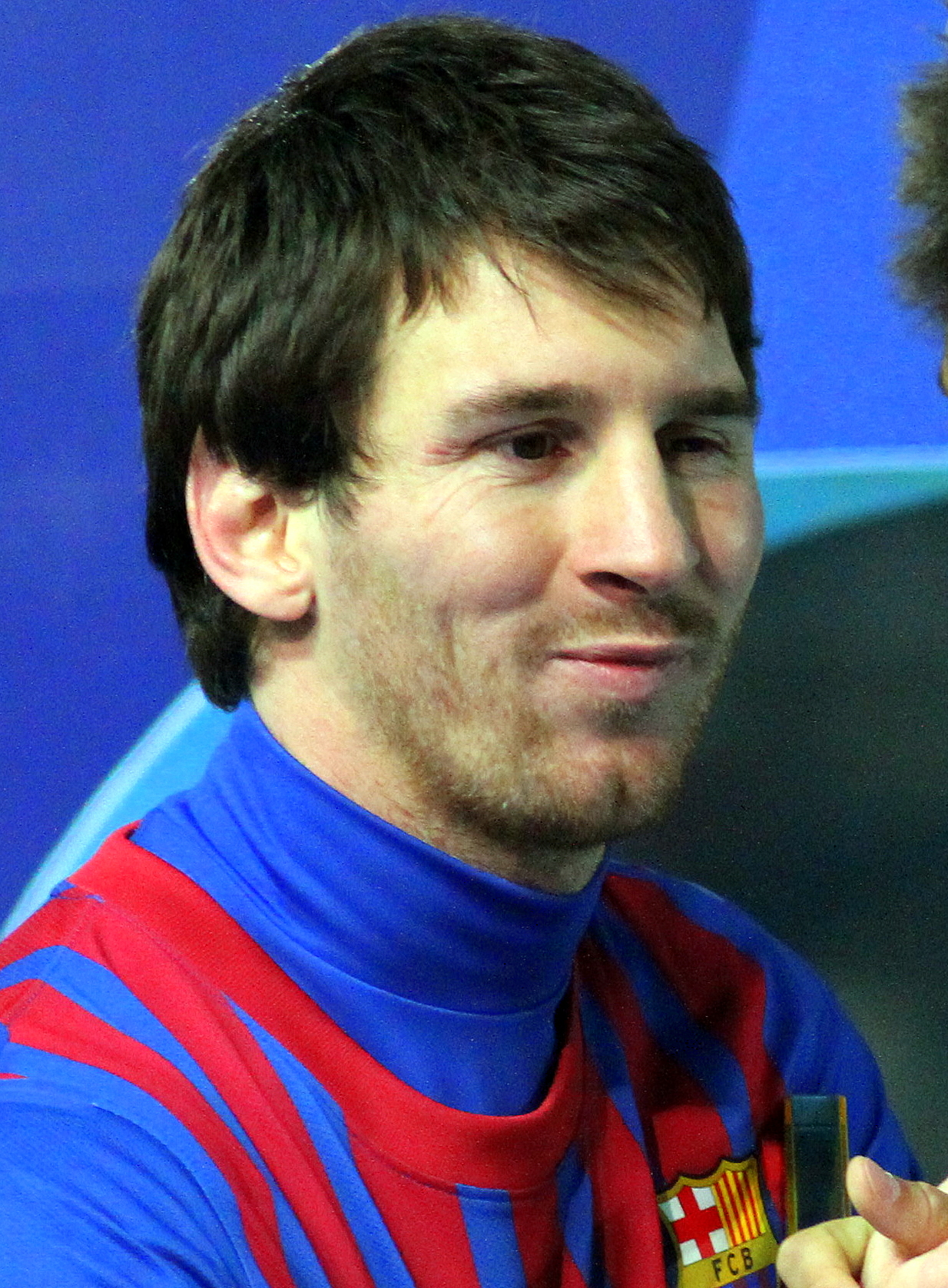
Lionel Messi

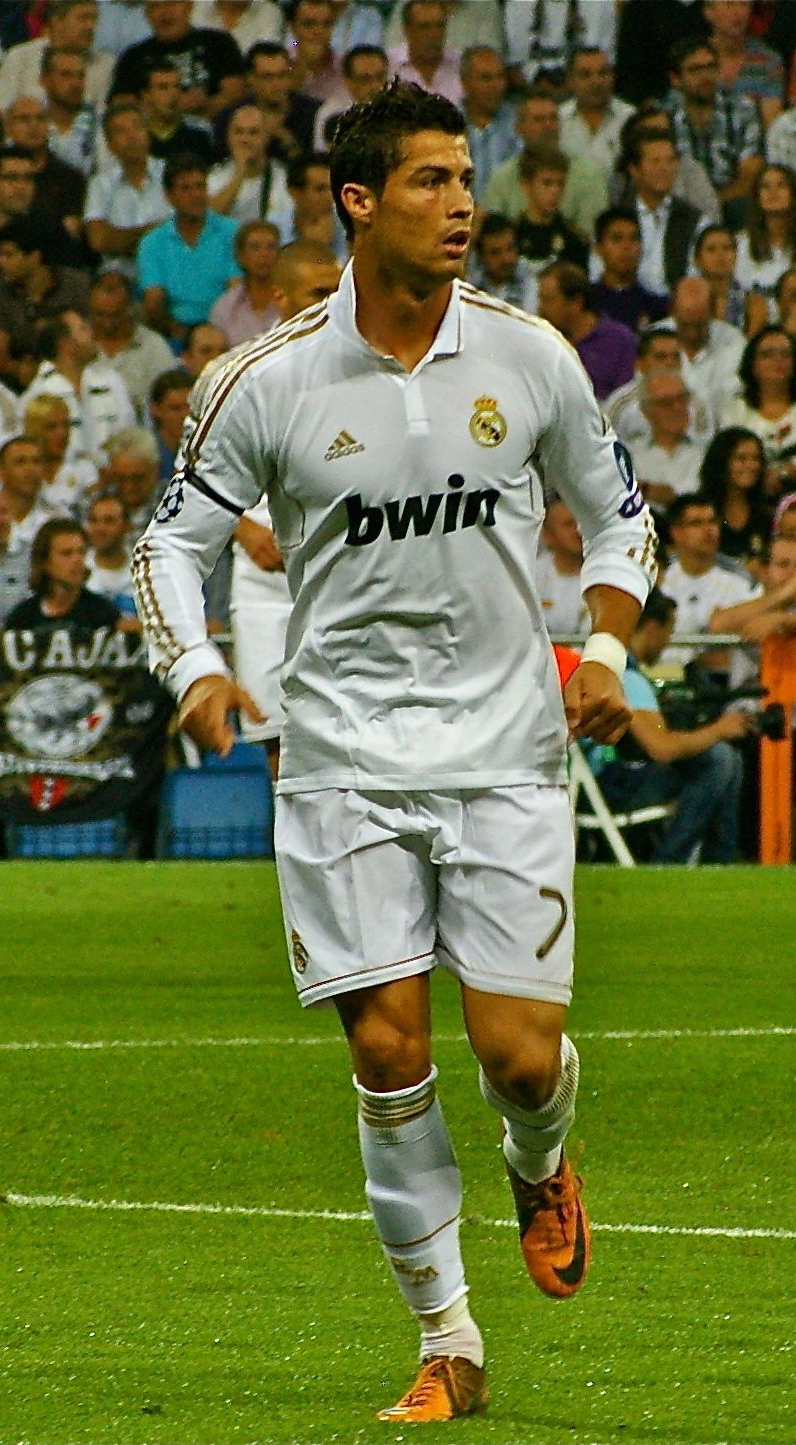
Cristiano Ronaldo

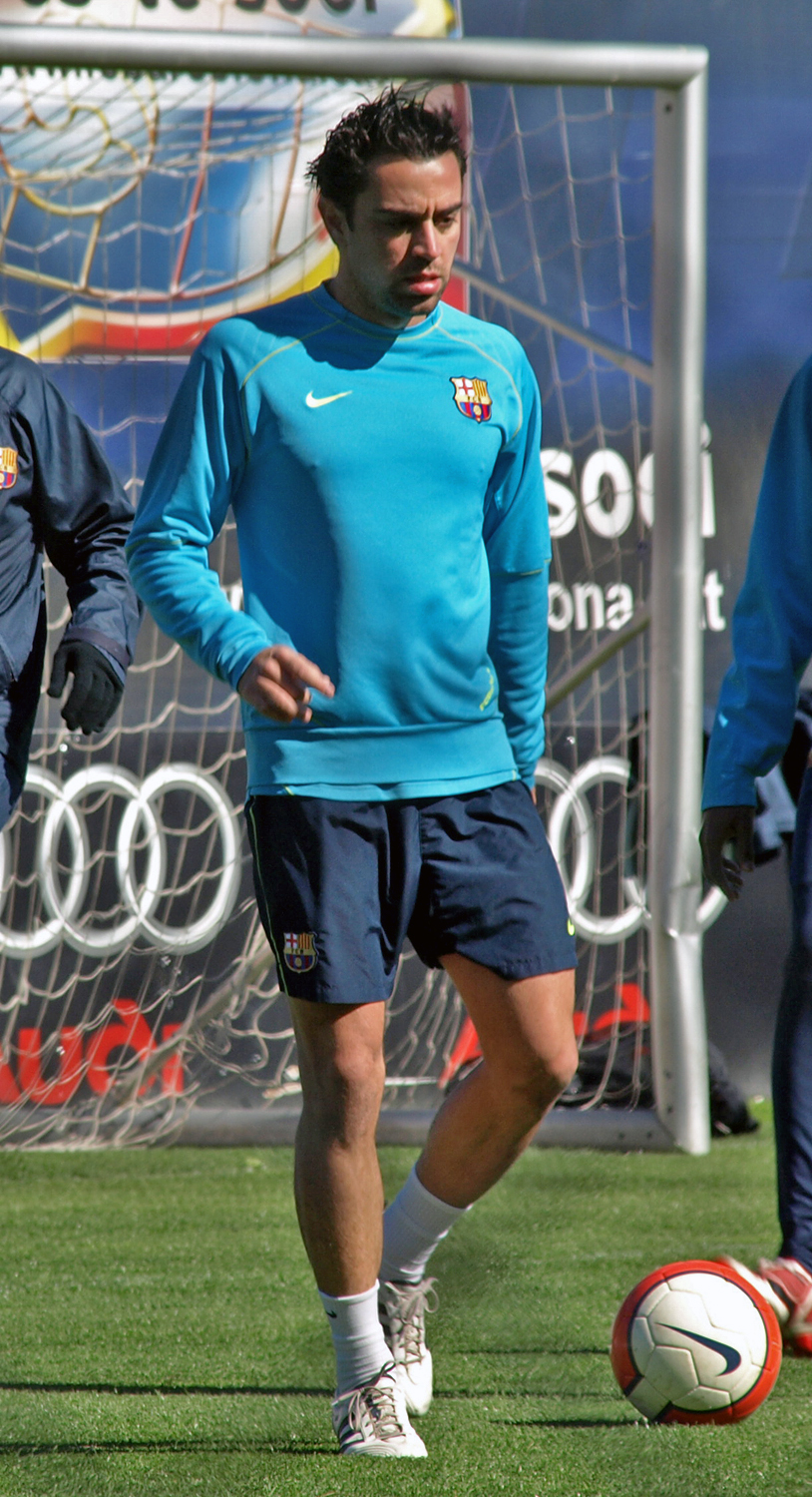
Xavi

Rank	Player	National team	Club(s)	Percent
1st	Lionel Messi	Argentina	(Spain) Barcelona	47.88%
2nd	Cristiano Ronaldo	Portugal	(Spain) Real Madrid	21.60%
3rd	Xavi	Spain	(Spain) Barcelona	9.23%

The following twenty players were also in contention for the award:

Rank	Player	National team	Club(s)	Percent
4th	Andrés Iniesta	Spain	(Spain) Barcelona	6.01%
5th	Wayne Rooney	England	(England) Manchester United	2.31%
6th	Luis Suárez	Uruguay	(Netherlands) Ajax (England) Liverpool	1.48%
7th	Diego Forlán	Uruguay	(Spain) Atlético Madrid (Italy) Internazionale	1.43%
8th	Samuel Eto'o	Cameroon	(Italy) Internazionale (Russia) Anzhi Makhachkala	1.34%
9th	Iker Casillas	Spain	(Spain) Real Madrid	1.29%
10th	Neymar	Brazil	(Brazil) Santos	1.12%
11th	Mesut Özil	Germany	(Spain) Real Madrid	0.76%
12th	Wesley Sneijder	Netherlands	(Italy) Internazionale	0.72%
13th	Thomas Müller	Germany	(Germany) Bayern Munich	0.64%
14th	David Villa	Spain	(Spain) Barcelona	0.53%
15th	Bastian Schweinsteiger	Germany	(Germany) Bayern Munich	0.50%
16th	Xabi Alonso	Spain	(Spain) Real Madrid	0.48%
17th	Sergio Agüero	Argentina	(Spain) Atlético Madrid (England) Manchester City	0.48%
18th	Eric Abidal	France	(Spain) Barcelona	0.36%
19th	Dani Alves	Brazil	(Spain) Barcelona	0.34%
20th	Karim Benzema	France	(Spain) Real Madrid	0.34%
21st	Cesc Fàbregas	Spain	(England) Arsenal (Spain) Barcelona	0.29%
22nd	Nani	Portugal	(England) Manchester United	0.26%
23rd	Gerard Piqué	Spain	(Spain) Barcelona	0.22%

=== FIFA Women's World Player of the Year ===
The top three nominees for the 2011 FIFA Women's World Player of the Year were:

Rank	Player	National team	Club(s)	Percent
1st	Homare Sawa	Japan	(Japan) INAC Kobe Leonessa	28.51%
2nd	Marta	Brazil	(United States) Western New York Flash	17.28%
3rd	Abby Wambach	United States	(United States) magicJack	13.26%

The following seven players also in contention for the award:

Rank	Player	Nationality	Club(s)	Percent
4th	Aya Miyama	Japan	(Japan) Okayama Yunogo Belle	12.18%
5th	Hope Solo	United States	(United States) magicJack	7.83%
6th	Lotta Schelin	Sweden	(France) Lyon	4.85%
7th	Kerstin Garefrekes	Germany	(Germany) 1. FFC Frankfurt	4.73%
8th	Alex Morgan	United States	(United States) Western New York Flash	4.34%
9th	Louisa Nécib	France	(France) Lyon	3.21%
10th	Sonia Bompastor	France	(France) Lyon	2.99%

=== FIFA World Coach of the Year for Men's Football ===
Rank	Coach	Nationality	Team(s)	Percent
1st	Pep Guardiola	Spain	(Spain) Barcelona	41.90%
2nd	Sir Alex Ferguson	Scotland	(England) Manchester United	15.59%
3rd	José Mourinho	Portugal	(Spain) Real Madrid	12.43%

Rank	Coach	Nationality	Team(s)	Votes
4th	Vicente del Bosque	Spain	Spain	9.12%
5th	Óscar Tabárez	Uruguay	Uruguay	7.47%
6th	Joachim Löw	Germany	Germany	4.40%
7th	André Villas-Boas	Portugal	(Portugal) Porto (England) Chelsea	4.16%
8th	Arsène Wenger	France	(England) Arsenal	1.91%
9th	Jürgen Klopp	Germany	(Germany) Borussia Dortmund	1.54%
10th	Rudi Garcia	France	(France) Lille	0.89%

=== FIFA World Coach of the Year for Women's Football ===
Rank	Coach	Nationality	Team(s)	Percent
1st	Norio Sasaki	Japan	Japan	45.57%
2nd	Pia Sundhage	Sweden	United States	15.83%
3rd	Bruno Bini	France	France	10.28%

=== FIFA/FIFPro World XI ===

Position	Player	National team	Club(s)
GK	Iker Casillas	Spain	(Spain) Real Madrid
DF	Dani Alves	Brazil	(Spain) Barcelona
DF	Gerard Piqué	Spain	(Spain) Barcelona
DF	Sergio Ramos	Spain	(Spain) Real Madrid
DF	Nemanja Vidić	Serbia	(England) Manchester United
MF	Xabi Alonso	Spain	(Spain) Real Madrid
MF	Andrés Iniesta	Spain	(Spain) Barcelona
MF	Xavi	Spain	(Spain) Barcelona
FW	Cristiano Ronaldo	Portugal	(Spain) Real Madrid
FW	Lionel Messi	Argentina	(Spain) Barcelona
FW	Wayne Rooney	England	(England) Manchester United

=== FIFA Puskás Award ===
Rank	Player	Nationality	Team	Percent
1st	Neymar	Brazil	(Brazil) Santos	
2nd	Wayne Rooney	England	(England) Manchester United	
3rd	Lionel Messi	Argentina	(Spain) Barcelona	

=== FIFA Presidential Award ===
- (Scotland) Sir Alex Ferguson

=== FIFA Fair Play Award ===
- Japan Football Association

== Controversy ==
The day after the awards ceremony, Spanish newspaper Marca reported that none of the four captains of the Spanish women's national team had voted for the Women's World Player of the Year award. According to the list of votes published by FIFA, captain Sandra Vilanova had awarded five points to Hope Solo, three to Louisa Nécib and one to Marta.
