= 2015 FIFA Ballon d'Or =

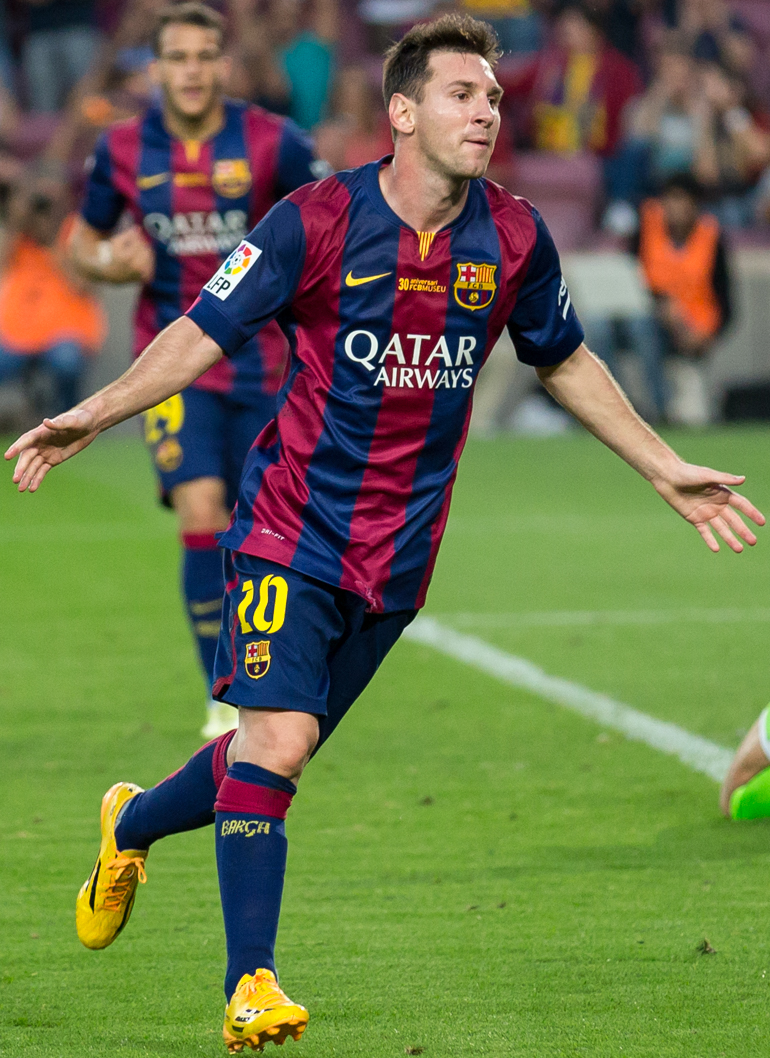
- 2015 FIFA Ballon d'Or winner, Lionel Messi
- Date: 11 January 2016
- Location: Zürich, Switzerland
- Country: Switzerland
- Presented by: FIFA

Highlights
- Won by: (Argentina) Lionel Messi (5th Ballon d'Or)
- Website: ballondor.com

The 2015 FIFA Ballon d'Or (lit. '2015 FIFA Golden Ball'), was the sixth year for FIFA's awards for the top football players and coaches of the year. The awards were given out in Zürich, Switzerland on 11 January 2016.

Lionel Messi won the award as the World Player of the Year for the fifth time, extending his own record of five wins. Carli Lloyd was named as the Women's World Player of the Year, while Luis Enrique received the World Coach of the Year for Men's Football and Jill Ellis the World Coach of the Year for Women's Football.

The ceremony was hosted by Kate Abdo and James Nesbitt.

This edition concluded the joint collaboration between France Football and FIFA for the presentation of the award.

== Winners and nominees ==
In late October 2015, FIFA revealed shortlist for the FIFA Ballon d'Or, FIFA Women's World Player of the Year and FIFA World Coaches of the Year. The shortlists for the women's awards were revealed on 19 October and the men's on 20 October.

=== FIFA Ballon d'Or ===
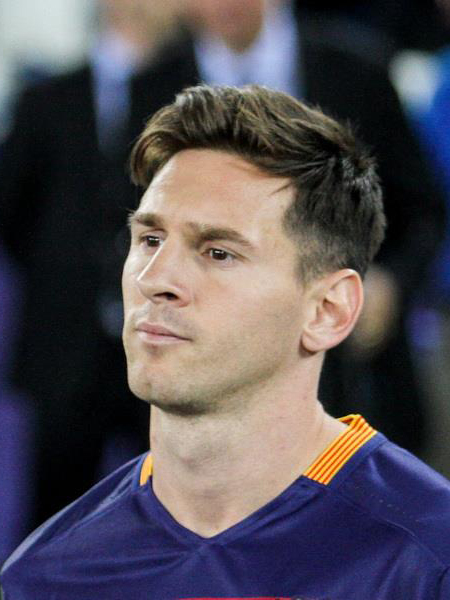
Lionel Messi

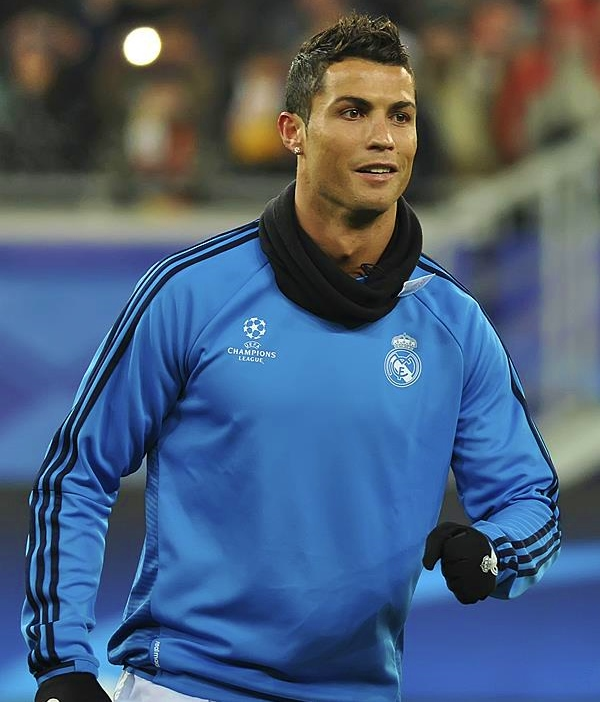
Cristiano Ronaldo

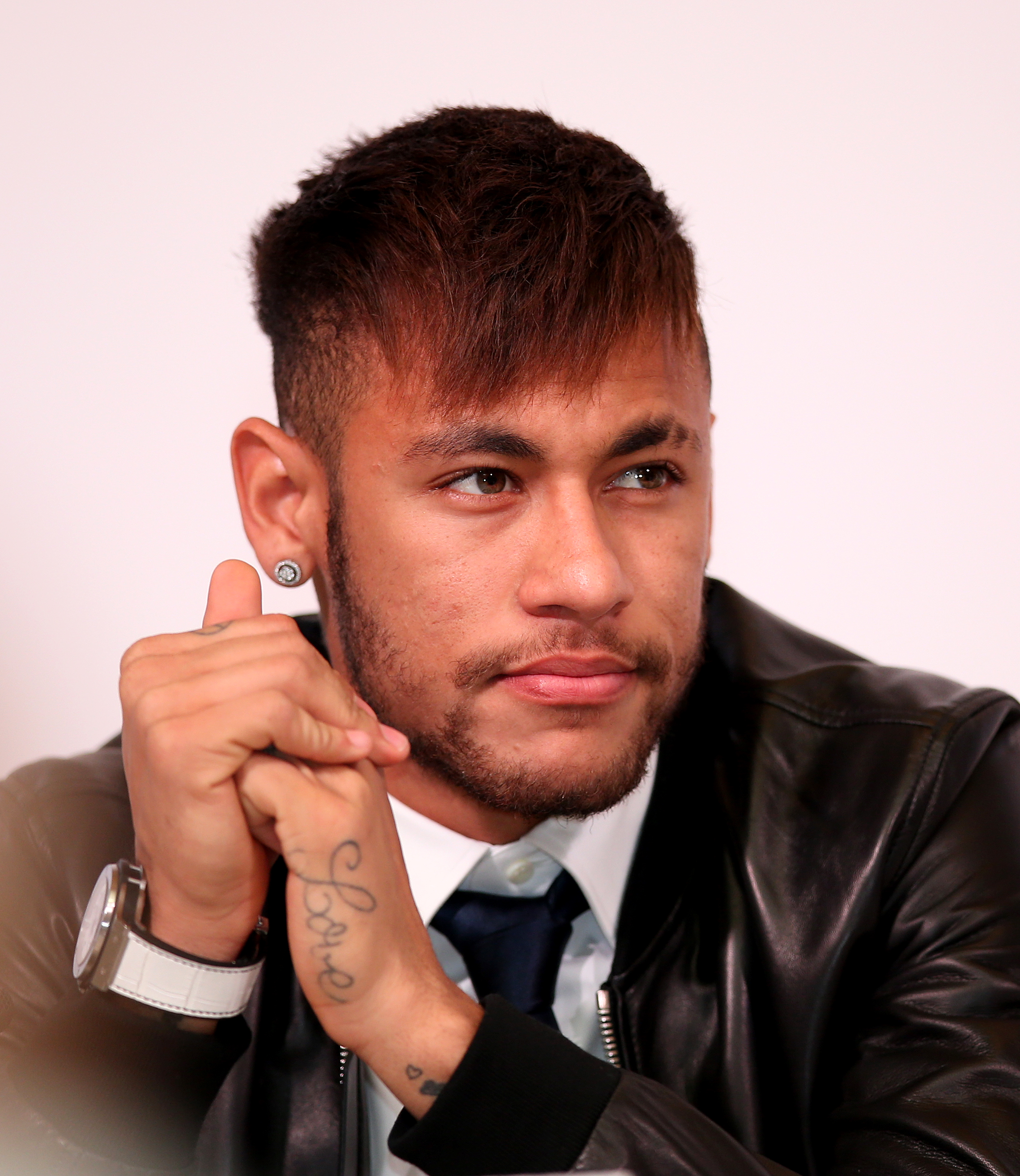
Neymar

The results for the 2015 FIFA Ballon d'Or were:

| Rank | Player | National team | Club(s) | Percent |
|---|---|---|---|---|
| 1 | Lionel Messi | Argentina | (Spain) Barcelona | 41.33% |
| 2 | Cristiano Ronaldo | Portugal | (Spain) Real Madrid | 27.76% |
| 3 | Neymar | Brazil | (Spain) Barcelona | 7.86% |

The following twenty players were also in contention for the award:

| Rank | Player | National team | Club(s) | Percent |
|---|---|---|---|---|
| 4 | Robert Lewandowski | Poland | (Germany) Bayern Munich | 4.17% |
| 5 | Luis Suárez | Uruguay | (Spain) Barcelona | 3.38% |
| 6 | Thomas Müller | Germany | (Germany) Bayern Munich | 2.21% |
| 7 | Manuel Neuer | Germany | (Germany) Bayern Munich | 1.97% |
| 8 | Eden Hazard | Belgium | (England) Chelsea | 1.33% |
| 9 | Andrés Iniesta | Spain | (Spain) Barcelona | 1.24% |
| 10 | Alexis Sánchez | Chile | (England) Arsenal | 1.18% |
| 11 | Zlatan Ibrahimović | Sweden | (France) Paris Saint-Germain | 1.13% |
| 12 | Yaya Touré | Ivory Coast | (England) Manchester City | 0.89% |
| 13 | Sergio Agüero | Argentina | (England) Manchester City | 0.86% |
| 14 | Javier Mascherano | Argentina | (Spain) Barcelona | 0.79% |
| 15 | Paul Pogba | France | (Italy) Juventus | 0.72% |
| 16 | Gareth Bale | Wales | (Spain) Real Madrid | 0.65% |
| 17 | Arturo Vidal | Chile | (Italy) Juventus (Germany) Bayern Munich | 0.58% |
| 18 | Kevin De Bruyne | Belgium | (Germany) VfL Wolfsburg (England) Manchester City | 0.47% |
| 19 | James Rodríguez | Colombia | (Spain) Real Madrid | 0.45% |
| 20 | Karim Benzema | France | (Spain) Real Madrid | 0.40% |
| 21 | Toni Kroos | Germany | (Spain) Real Madrid | 0.2931% |
| 22 | Arjen Robben | Netherlands | (Germany) Bayern Munich | 0.2930% |
| 23 | Ivan Rakitić | Croatia | (Spain) Barcelona | 0.05% |

=== FIFA Puskás Award ===
The winner of the FIFA Puskás Award was:

- (Brazil) Wendell Lira ( (Brazil) Goianésia), 1–2 vs (Brazil) Atlético Goianiense, Estádio Serra Dourada, 11 March 2015

The other nominees were:

- (Argentina) Lionel Messi ( (Spain) Barcelona), 0–1 vs (Spain) Athletic Bilbao, Camp Nou, 30 May 2015
- (Italy) Alessandro Florenzi ( (Italy) Roma), 1–1 vs (Spain) Barcelona, Stadio Olimpico, 16 September 2015

=== FIFA/FIFPro World XI ===

FIFA/FIFPro World XI 2015

| Position | Player | National team | Club(s) |
|---|---|---|---|
| GK | Manuel Neuer | Germany | (Germany) Bayern Munich |
| DF | Thiago Silva | Brazil | (France) Paris Saint-Germain |
| DF | Marcelo | Brazil | (Spain) Real Madrid |
| DF | Sergio Ramos | Spain | (Spain) Real Madrid |
| DF | Dani Alves | Brazil | (Spain) Barcelona |
| MF | Andrés Iniesta | Spain | (Spain) Barcelona |
| MF | Luka Modrić | Croatia | (Spain) Real Madrid |
| MF | Paul Pogba | France | (Italy) Juventus |
| FW | Neymar | Brazil | (Spain) Barcelona |
| FW | Lionel Messi | Argentina | (Spain) Barcelona |
| FW | Cristiano Ronaldo | Portugal | (Spain) Real Madrid |

=== FIFA Women's World Player of the Year ===
The results for the 2015 FIFA Women's World Player of the Year were:

| Rank | Player | National team | Club(s) | Percent |
|---|---|---|---|---|
| 1 | Carli Lloyd | United States | (United States) Houston Dash | 35.28% |
| 2 | Célia Šašić | Germany | (Germany) 1. FFC Frankfurt | 12.60% |
| 3 | Aya Miyama | Japan | (Japan) Okayama Yunogo Belle | 9.88% |

The following seven players were also named to the shortlist for the award:

| Player | National team | Club(s) |
|---|---|---|
| Nadine Angerer | Germany | (Australia) Brisbane Roar (United States) Portland Thorns |
| Ramona Bachmann | Switzerland | (Sweden) FC Rosengård |
| Kadeisha Buchanan | Canada | (United States) West Virginia Mountaineers |
| Amandine Henry | France | (France) Lyon |
| Eugénie Le Sommer | France | (France) Lyon |
| Megan Rapinoe | United States | (United States) Seattle Reign |
| Hope Solo | United States | (United States) Seattle Reign |

=== FIFA World Coach of the Year for Men's Football ===
The following were the final three nominees for the FIFA World Coach of the Year for Men's Football:

| Rank | Coach | Nationality | Team(s) | Percent |
|---|---|---|---|---|
| 1 | Luis Enrique | Spain | (Spain) Barcelona | 31.08% |
| 2 | Pep Guardiola | Spain | (Germany) Bayern Munich | 22.97% |
| 3 | Jorge Sampaoli | Argentina | Chile | 9.47% |

The following seven managers were also named to the shortlist for the award:

| Coach | Nationality | Team(s) |
|---|---|---|
| Massimiliano Allegri | Italy | (Italy) Juventus |
| Carlo Ancelotti | Italy | (Spain) Real Madrid |
| Laurent Blanc | France | (France) Paris Saint-Germain |
| Unai Emery | Spain | (Spain) Sevilla |
| José Mourinho | Portugal | (England) Chelsea |
| Diego Simeone | Argentina | (Spain) Atlético Madrid |
| Arsène Wenger | France | (England) Arsenal |

=== FIFA World Coach of the Year for Women's Football ===
The following were the final three nominees for the FIFA World Coach of the Year for Women's Football:

| Rank | Coach | Nationality | Team(s) | Percent |
|---|---|---|---|---|
| 1 | Jill Ellis | England | United States | 42.98% |
| 2 | Norio Sasaki | Japan | Japan | 17.79% |
| 3 | Mark Sampson | Wales | England | 10.68% |

The following seven managers were also named to the shortlist for the award:

| Coach | Nationality | Team(s) |
|---|---|---|
| Calle Barrling | Sweden | Sweden U19 |
| Colin Bell | England | (Germany) 1. FFC Frankfurt |
| Farid Benstiti | France | (France) Paris Saint-Germain |
| Laura Harvey | England | (United States) Seattle Reign |
| John Herdman | England | Canada |
| Gérard Prêcheur | France | (France) Lyon |
| Thomas Wörle | Germany | (Germany) Bayern Munich |
