= 2009 Ballon d'Or =

Annual association football award event in France

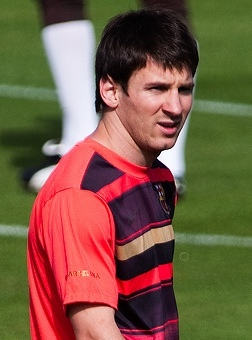
- 2009 Ballon d'Or winner, Lionel Messi
- Date: 1 December 2009
- Location: Paris, France
- Country: France
- Presented by: France Football

Highlights
- Won by: (Argentina) Lionel Messi (1st award)
- Website: ballondor.com

The 2009 Ballon d'Or (lit. '2009 Golden Ball'), given to the best football player in the world as judged by an international panel of sports journalists, was awarded to Lionel Messi of Barcelona on 1 December 2009, the first of his record setting eight Ballon d'Or awards.

Messi won the award by a then record margin, 240 points ahead of 2008 winner Cristiano Ronaldo. Xavi was the second Barcelona player in the top three, finishing a further 63 points behind Ronaldo. Messi's win made him the first Argentine-born player to win the award since Omar Sívori in 1961; however, Sívori had taken Italian citizenship by that time and is recognised to have won the Ballon d'Or as an Italian player.

== Rankings ==
Rank	Player	Nationality	Club(s)	Points
1	Lionel Messi	Argentina	(Spain) Barcelona	473
2	Cristiano Ronaldo	Portugal	(England) Manchester United (Spain) Real Madrid	233
3	Xavi	Spain	(Spain) Barcelona	170
4	Andrés Iniesta	Spain	(Spain) Barcelona	149
5	Samuel Eto'o	Cameroon	(Spain) Barcelona (Italy) Internazionale	75
6	Kaká	Brazil	(Italy) Milan (Spain) Real Madrid	58
7	Zlatan Ibrahimović	Sweden	(Italy) Internazionale (Spain) Barcelona	50
8	Wayne Rooney	England	(England) Manchester United	35
9	Didier Drogba	Ivory Coast	(England) Chelsea	33
10	Steven Gerrard	England	(England) Liverpool	32
11	Fernando Torres	Spain	(England) Liverpool	22
12	Cesc Fàbregas	Spain	(England) Arsenal	13
13	Edin Džeko	Bosnia and Herzegovina	(Germany) VfL Wolfsburg	12
14	Ryan Giggs	Wales	(England) Manchester United	11
15	Thierry Henry	France	(Spain) Barcelona	9
16	Luís Fabiano	Brazil	(Spain) Sevilla	8
16	Nemanja Vidić	Serbia	(England) Manchester United	8
16	Iker Casillas	Spain	(Spain) Real Madrid	8
19	Diego Forlán	Uruguay	(Spain) Atlético Madrid	7
20	Yoann Gourcuff	France	(France) Bordeaux	6
21	Andrey Arshavin	Russia	(England) Arsenal	5
21	Júlio César	Brazil	(Italy) Internazionale	5
21	Frank Lampard	England	(England) Chelsea	5
24	Maicon	Brazil	(Italy) Internazionale	4
25	Diego	Brazil	(Germany) Werder Bremen (Italy) Juventus	3
26	David Villa	Spain	(Spain) Valencia	2
26	John Terry	England	(England) Chelsea	2
28	Franck Ribéry	France	(Germany) Bayern Munich	1
28	Yaya Touré	Ivory Coast	(Spain) Barcelona	1
30	Karim Benzema	France	(France) Lyon (Spain) Real Madrid	0
