= 2013 FIFA Ballon d'Or =

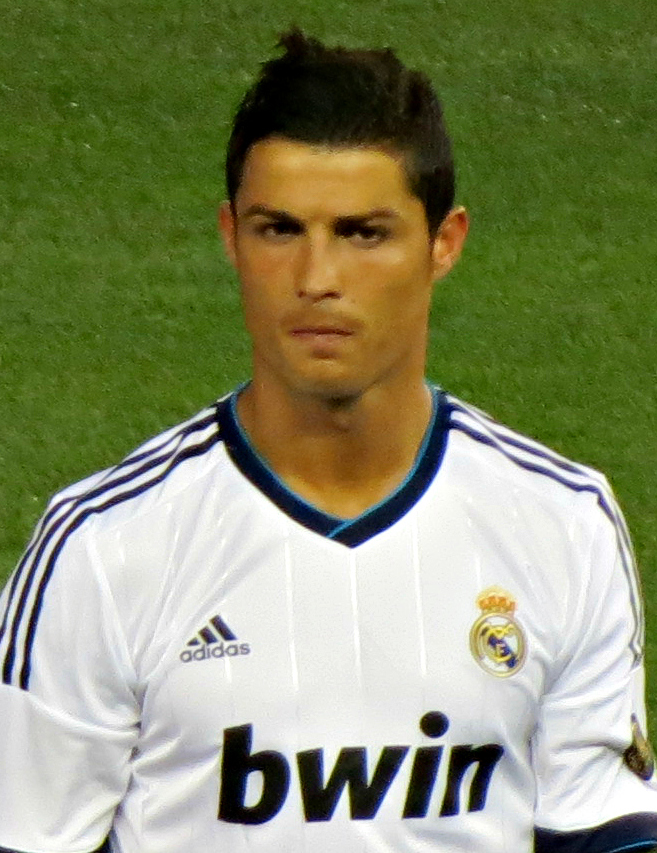
- 2013 FIFA Ballon d'Or winner, Cristiano Ronaldo
- Date: 13 January 2014
- Location: Zürich, Switzerland
- Country: Switzerland
- Presented by: FIFA

Highlights
- Won by: (Portugal) Cristiano Ronaldo (2nd Ballon d'Or)
- Website: ballondor.com

The 2013 FIFA Ballon d'Or (lit. '2013 FIFA Golden Ball'), was the fourth year for FIFA's awards for the top football players and coaches of the year. The awards were given out in Zürich on 13 January 2014. The deadline for voting was 15 November 2013 but was extended to 29 November 2013 for the first time in history.

Portuguese winger Cristiano Ronaldo won the Ballon d'Or award as the World Player of the Year. It was his second Ballon d'Or, after winning the award in 2008, as well as his first FIFA Ballon d'Or. Nadine Angerer was announced as the Women's World Player of the Year recipient, while Jupp Heynckes claimed the World Coach of the Year for Men's Football, and Silvia Neid the World Coach of the Year for Women's Football. The ninety-minute ceremony was hosted by Fernanda Lima along with Ruud Gullit.

== Voting ==
The deadline for voting was 15 November 2013. However, for the first time ever, on 20 November 2013, FIFA announced that voting was extended to 29 November 2013 after not receiving a response of enough eligible voters before the original deadline. The winners were announced on 13 January 2014.

== Winners and nominees ==
=== FIFA Ballon d'Or ===
A shortlist of 23 male players was compiled by members of FIFA's Football Committee as well as a group of experts from France Football. It was announced on 29 October 2013.

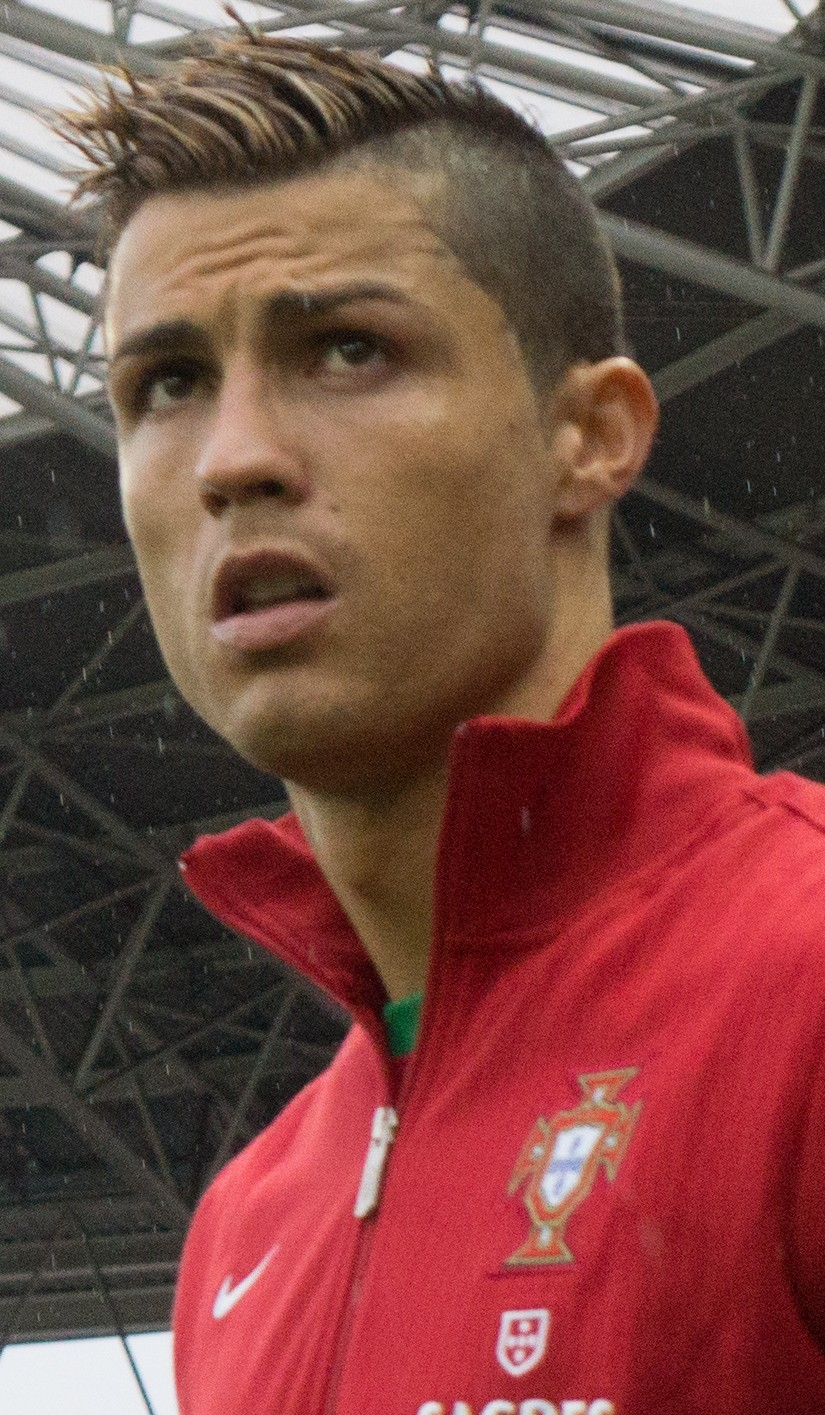
Cristiano Ronaldo

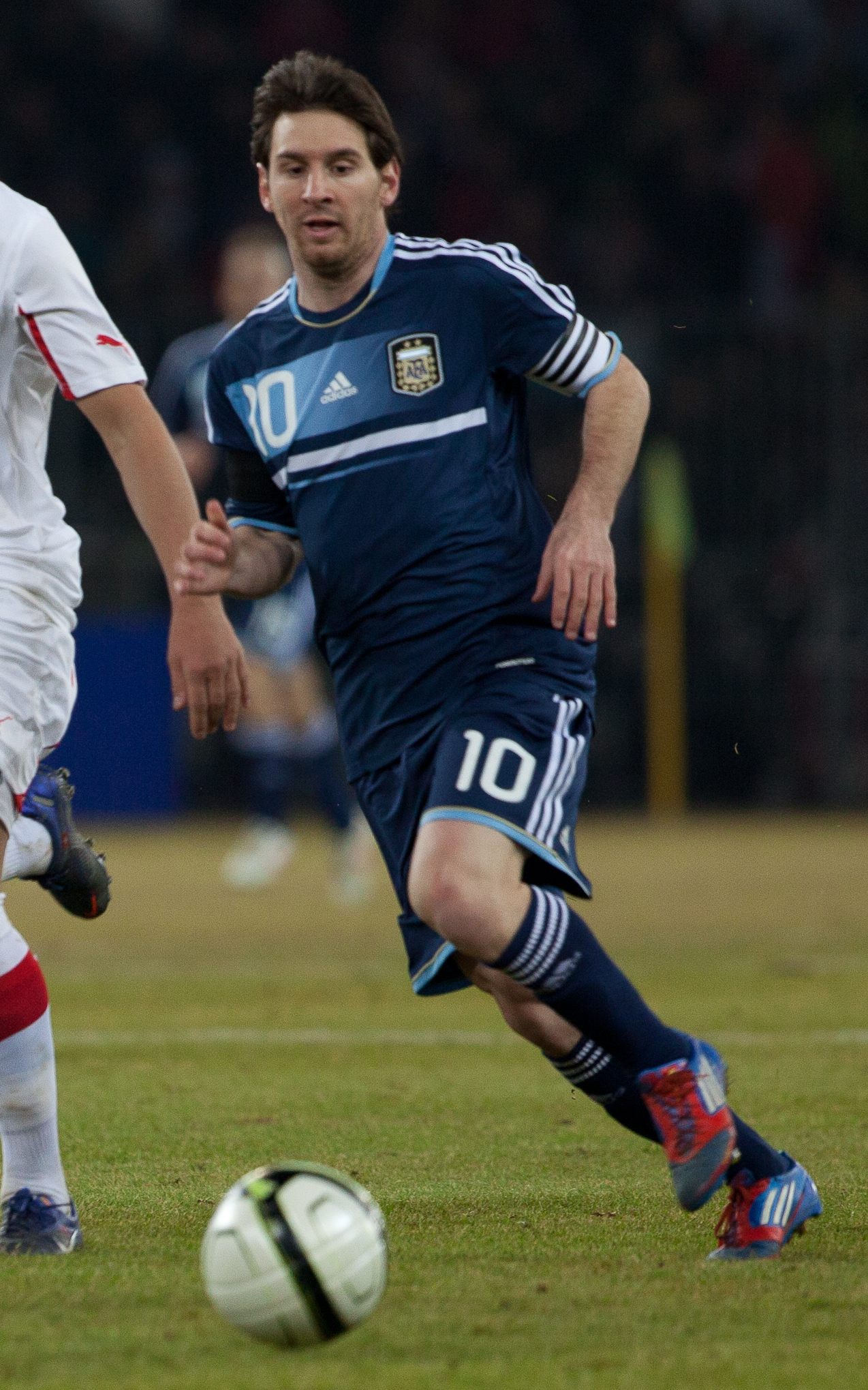
Lionel Messi

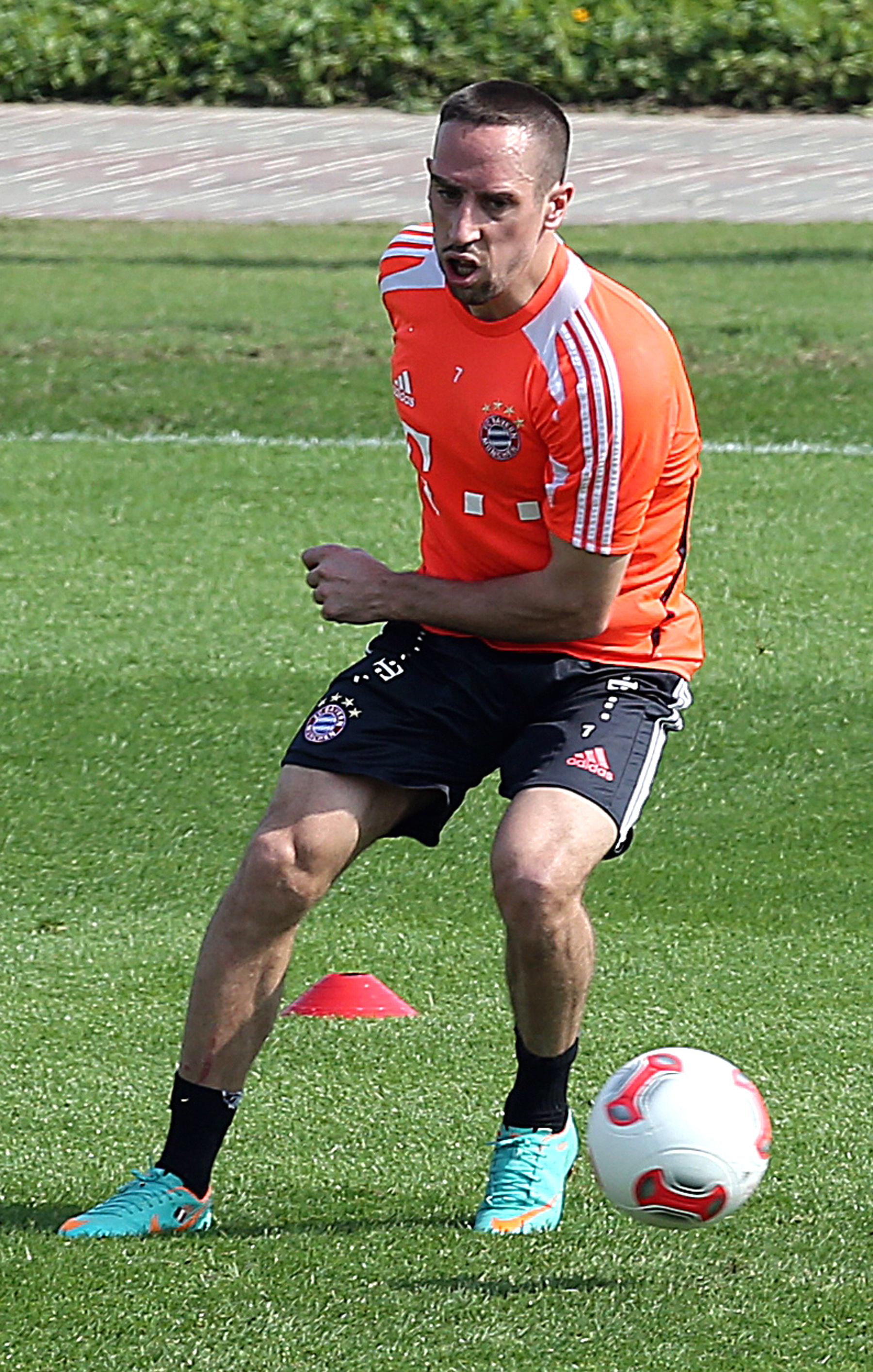
Franck Ribéry

There were three voters per FIFA member federation: one journalist and the coaches and captain of the national men's team.

The results for the 2013 FIFA Ballon d'Or were:

Rank	Player	National team	Club(s)	Percent	Votes
1st	Cristiano Ronaldo	Portugal	(Spain) Real Madrid	27.99%	1365
2nd	Lionel Messi	Argentina	(Spain) Barcelona	24.72%	1205
3rd	Franck Ribéry	France	(Germany) Bayern Munich	23.36%	1127

The following twenty players were also in contention for the award:

Rank	Player	National team	Club(s)	Percent	Votes
4th	Zlatan Ibrahimović	Sweden	(France) Paris Saint-Germain	5.29%	257
5th	Neymar	Brazil	(Brazil) Santos (Spain) Barcelona	3.17%	155
6th	Andrés Iniesta	Spain	(Spain) Barcelona	2.08%	103
7th	Robin van Persie	Netherlands	(England) Manchester United	1.79%	88
8th	Arjen Robben	Netherlands	(Germany) Bayern Munich	1.77%	85
9th	Gareth Bale	Wales	(England) Tottenham Hotspur (Spain) Real Madrid	1.32%	65
10th	Andrea Pirlo	Italy	(Italy) Juventus	1.11%	70
11th	Radamel Falcao	Colombia	(Spain) Atlético Madrid (France) Monaco	1.08%	53
12th	Yaya Touré	Ivory Coast	(England) Manchester City	0.99%	48
13th	Robert Lewandowski	Poland	(Germany) Borussia Dortmund	0.92%	43
14th	Philipp Lahm	Germany	(Germany) Bayern Munich	0.82%	40
14th	Xavi	Spain	(Spain) Barcelona	0.82%	40
16th	Mesut Özil	Germany	(Spain) Real Madrid (England) Arsenal	0.71%	35
17th	Bastian Schweinsteiger	Germany	(Germany) Bayern Munich	0.43%	21
17th	Thomas Müller	Germany	(Germany) Bayern Munich	0.43%	21
19th	Luis Suárez	Uruguay	(England) Liverpool	0.39%	19
20th	Edinson Cavani	Uruguay	(Italy) Napoli (France) Paris Saint-Germain	0.36%	12
21st	Thiago Silva	Brazil	(France) Paris Saint-Germain	0.24%	12
22nd	Eden Hazard	Belgium	(England) Chelsea	0.16%	8
23rd	Manuel Neuer	Germany	(Germany) Bayern Munich	0.08%	4

In January 2014, Cristiano Ronaldo released a video on his official Facebook account celebrating his recent winning of the Ballon d'Or, which featured the track Twin Turbo by Portuguese electronic music band Sensible Soccers. The video was watched more than 5.5 million times in 40 hours. The band had previously expressed in an interview that they were "fervent admirers of President Ronaldo."

=== FIFA Women's World Player of the Year ===
- (Germany) Nadine Angerer ( (Germany) 1. FFC Frankfurt / (Australia) Brisbane Roar)

=== FIFA World Coach of the Year for Men's Football ===
- (Germany) Jupp Heynckes ( (Germany) Bayern Munich)

=== FIFA World Coach of the Year for Women's Football ===
- Silvia Neid (Germany)

=== FIFA/FIFPro World XI ===

FIFA/FIFPro World XI 2013

Position	Player	National team	Club(s)
GK	Manuel Neuer	Germany	(Germany) Bayern Munich
DF	Philipp Lahm	Germany	(Germany) Bayern Munich
DF	Sergio Ramos	Spain	(Spain) Real Madrid
DF	Thiago Silva	Brazil	(France) Paris Saint-Germain
DF	Dani Alves	Brazil	(Spain) Barcelona
MF	Andrés Iniesta	Spain	(Spain) Barcelona
MF	Xavi	Spain	(Spain) Barcelona
MF	Franck Ribéry	France	(Germany) Bayern Munich
FW	Cristiano Ronaldo	Portugal	(Spain) Real Madrid
FW	Zlatan Ibrahimović	Sweden	(France) Paris Saint-Germain
FW	Lionel Messi	Argentina	(Spain) Barcelona

=== FIFA Puskás Award ===
External videos
- Zlatan Ibrahimović GOAL - FIFA Puskas Award 2013 WINNER on YouTube
- Zlatan Ibrahimović: FIFA Puskas Award Reaction on YouTube

- (Sweden) Zlatan Ibrahimović, 4–2 vs England, Friends Arena, 14 November 2012

=== FIFA Presidential Award ===
- (Belgium) Jacques Rogge

=== FIFA Fair Play Award ===
- Afghanistan Football Federation

=== FIFA Ballon d'Or Prix d'Honneur ===
- (Brazil) Pelé

Pelé was given an honorary Ballon d'Or, having won three FIFA World Cups with Brazil but never an individual award from FIFA, as during his playing career only European-based players were eligible to win the original Ballon d'Or.

== Contenders ==
=== FIFA Women's World Player of the Year ===
On 29 October 2012, a 10-player shortlist was unveiled for the FIFA's Women's Player of the Year, which was chosen by experts from FIFA's Committee for Women's Football and the FIFA Women's World Cup and a group of experts from France Football. It was announced on 29 October 2013.

The three finalists for the award, announced on 9 December 2013, are indicated in bold.

Player	National team	Club
**Nadine Angerer**	Germany	(Germany) Frankfurt (Australia) Brisbane Roar
Nilla Fischer	Sweden	(Sweden) Linköpings (Germany) Wolfsburg
Lena Goeßling	Germany	(Germany) Wolfsburg
Saki Kumagai	Japan	(Germany) Frankfurt (France) Lyon
**Marta**	Brazil	(Sweden) Tyresö
Alex Morgan	United States	(United States) Portland Thorns
Yūki Ōgimi	Japan	(Germany) Turbine Potsdam (England) Chelsea
Lotta Schelin	Sweden	(France) Lyon
Christine Sinclair	Canada	(United States) Portland Thorns
**Abby Wambach**	United States	(United States) Western New York Flash

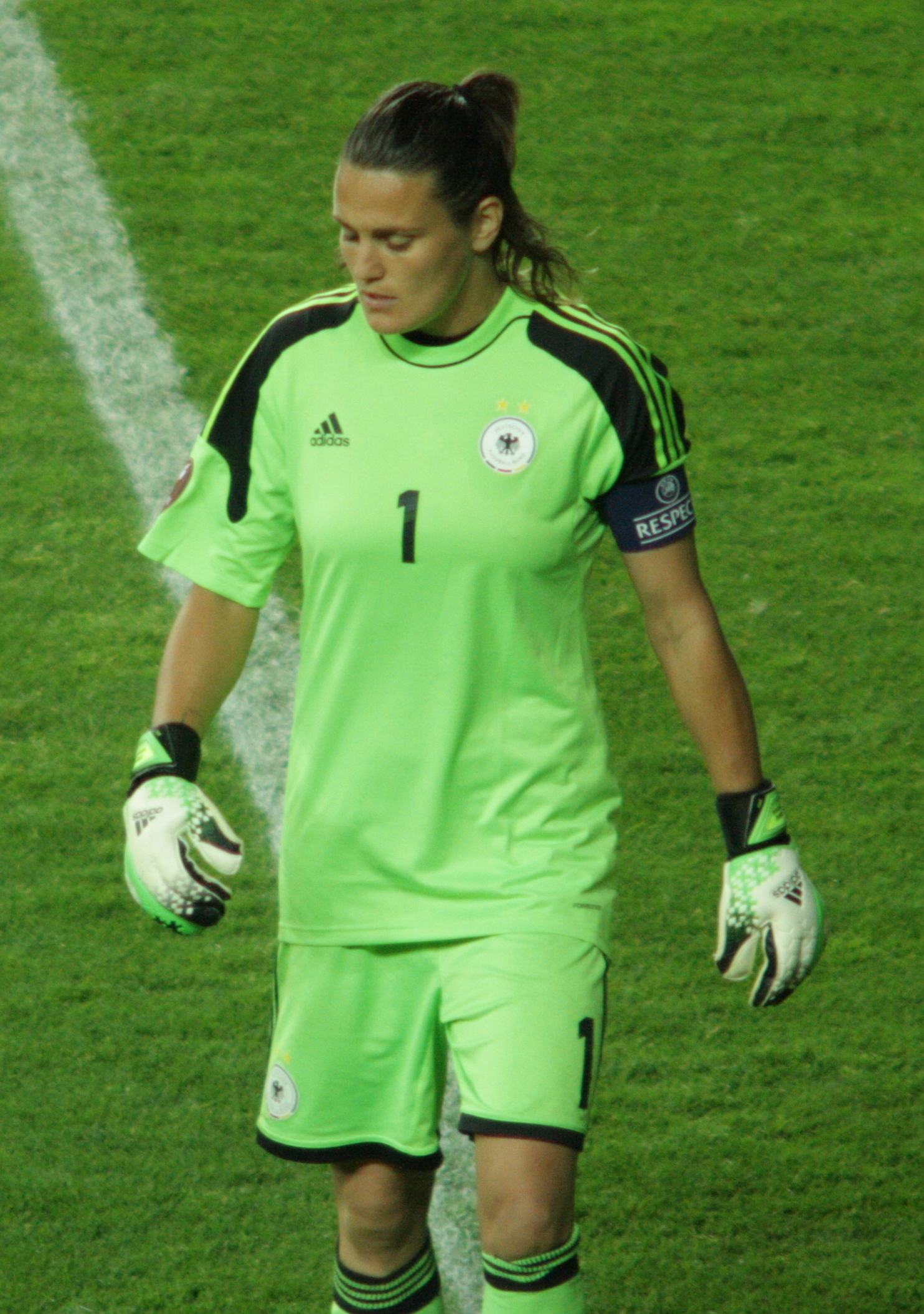
Nadine Angerer

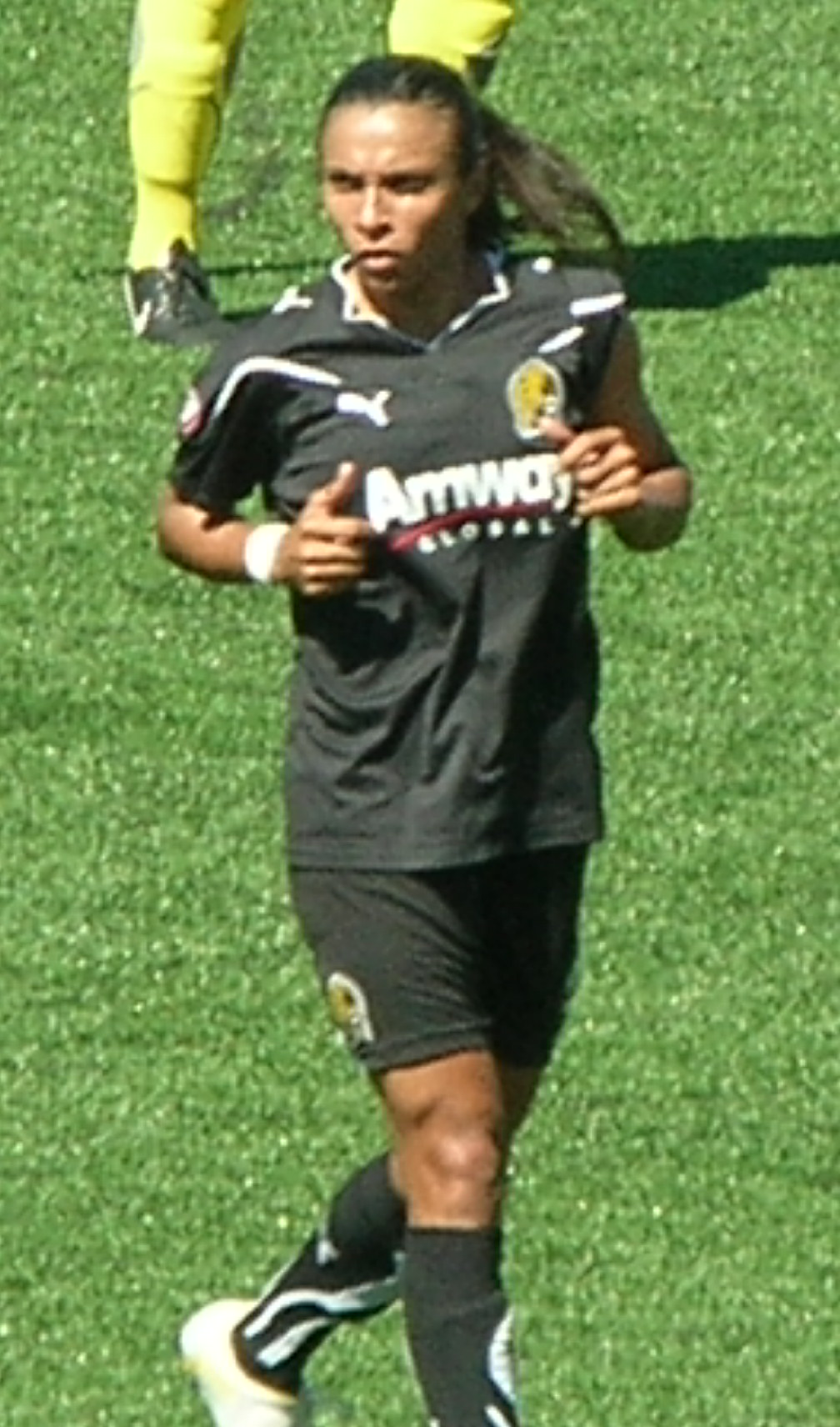
Marta

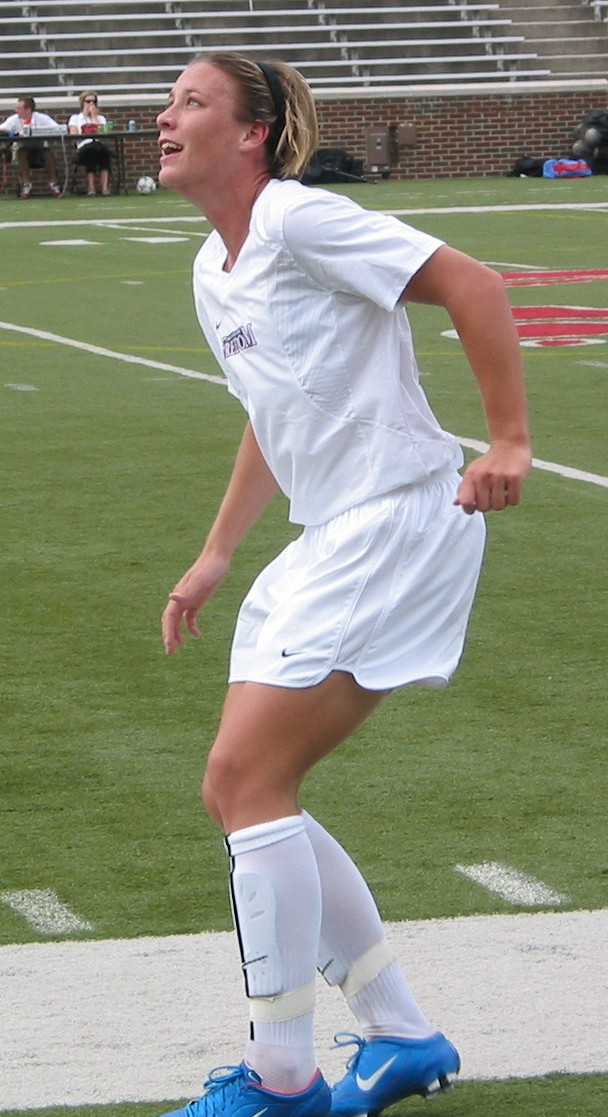
Abby Wambach

=== FIFA World Coach of the Year for Men's Football ===
This award will be decided by the same voters and system as that of the men's player award. The shortlist of candidates was announced on 29 October 2013, with the three finalists (indicated in bold type) announced on 9 December 2013.

Coach	National team	Team
Carlo Ancelotti	Italy	(France) Paris Saint-Germain (Spain) Real Madrid
Rafael Benítez	Spain	(England) Chelsea (Italy) Napoli
Antonio Conte	Italy	(Italy) Juventus
Vicente del Bosque	Spain	Spain
**Sir Alex Ferguson**	Scotland	(England) Manchester United
**Jupp Heynckes**	Germany	(Germany) Bayern Munich
**Jürgen Klopp**	Germany	(Germany) Borussia Dortmund
José Mourinho	Portugal	(Spain) Real Madrid (England) Chelsea
Luiz Felipe Scolari	Brazil	Brazil
Arsène Wenger	France	(England) Arsenal

=== FIFA World Coach of the Year for Women's Football ===
This award will be decided by the same voters and system as that of the women's player award. The shortlist was announced on 29 October 2013, and the three finalists (indicated in bold type) were announced on 9 December 2013.

Coach	National team	Team
Gilles Eyquem	France	France
Kenneth Heiner-Møller	Denmark	Denmark
**Ralf Kellermann**	Germany	(Germany) Wolfsburg
Shelley Kerr	Scotland	(England) Arsenal
Patrice Lair	France	(France) Lyon
**Silvia Neid**	Germany	Germany
Cindy Parlow Cone	United States	(United States) Portland Thorns
Even Pellerud	Norway	Norway
Anna Signeul	Sweden	Scotland
**Pia Sundhage**	Sweden	Sweden
