= Bruno Bini =

French footballer and manager (born 1954)

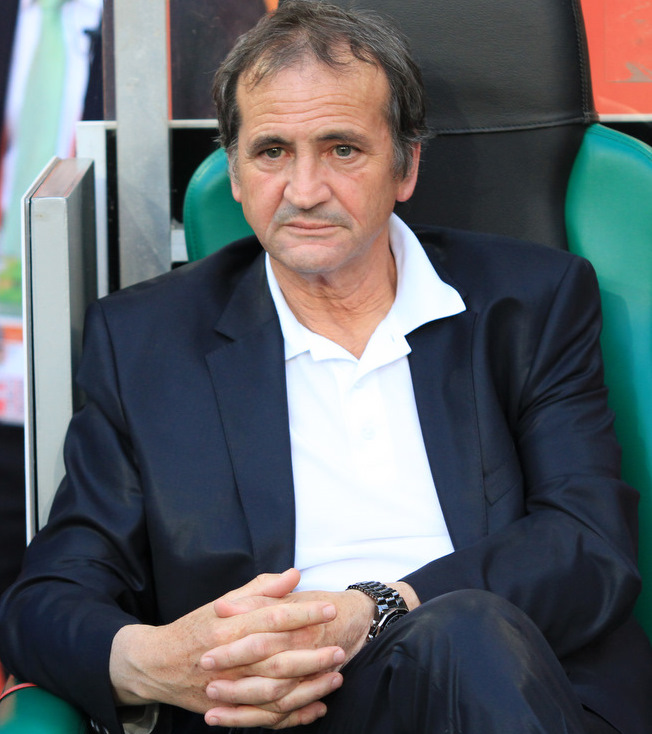

Personal information
- Full name: Bruno Bini
- Date of birth: 1 October 1954 (age 72)
- Place of birth: Orléans, France
- Position: Midfielder

Youth career
- 1970–1971: Laragne Sports
- 1971–1972: AS Aix-en-Provence

Senior career*
Years	Team	Apps	(Gls)
1972–1973	AS Aix-en-Provence		
1973–1974	Nancy		
1974–1975	Tours		
1976–1979	FC Meung-sur-Loire		
1979–1981	Orléans FC		

Managerial career
- 1993–1997: France (women U-16)
- 1993–1997: France (women U-20)
- 1997–2004: France (women U-18 and U-19)
- 2007–2013: France (women)
- 2015–2017: China (women)
- * Club domestic league appearances and goals

Bruno Bini (born 1 October 1954) is a former French football manager who formerly managed the French women's national team. Under his charge, his team finished in fourth position in both the 2011 FIFA Women's World Cup and 2012 Summer Olympics.

In 2015, he became Chinese women's national team coach.
