= 2008 Ballon d'Or =

Football award

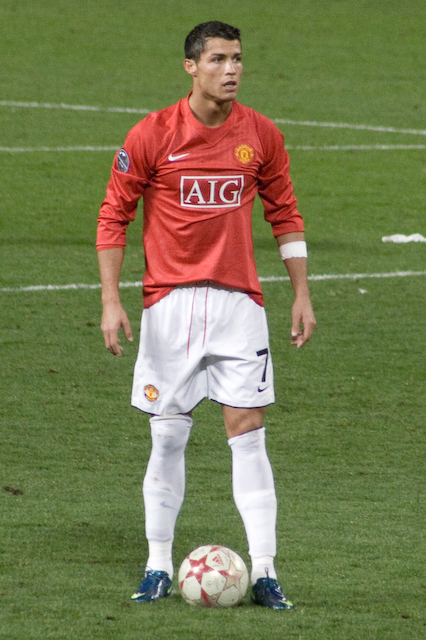
- 2008 Ballon d'Or winner, Cristiano Ronaldo
- Date: 2 December 2008
- Location: Paris, France
- Country: France
- Presented by: France Football

Highlights
- Won by: (Portugal) Cristiano Ronaldo (1st award)
- Website: ballondor.com

The 2008 Ballon d'Or (lit. '2008 Golden Ball'), given to the best football player in the world as judged by an international panel of sports journalists, was awarded on 2 December 2008. Cristiano Ronaldo won the award, being his first of five. His win also began a 10-year dominance of the award between him and Lionel Messi — which eventually led to an intense rivalry between the two. Both players had won five Ballon d'Or awards before the dominance was ended in 2018 by Luka Modrić.

== Rankings ==
Rank	Player	Nationality	Club(s)	Points
1	Cristiano Ronaldo	Portugal	(England) Manchester United	446
2	Lionel Messi	Argentina	(Spain) Barcelona	281
3	Fernando Torres	Spain	(England) Liverpool	179
4	Iker Casillas	Spain	(Spain) Real Madrid	133
5	Xavi	Spain	(Spain) Barcelona	97
6	Andrey Arshavin	Russia	(Russia) Zenit Saint Petersburg	64
7	David Villa	Spain	(Spain) Valencia	55
8	Zlatan Ibrahimović	Sweden	(Italy) Inter Milan	30
9	Kaká	Brazil	(Italy) AC Milan	29
10	Steven Gerrard	England	(England) Liverpool	28
11	Marcos Senna	Spain	(Spain) Villarreal	16
12	Emmanuel Adebayor	Togo	(England) Arsenal	12
13	Wayne Rooney	England	(England) Manchester United	11
14	Sergio Agüero	Argentina	(Spain) Atlético Madrid	10
15	Frank Lampard	England	(England) Chelsea	8
16	Franck Ribéry	France	(Germany) Bayern Munich	7
17	Samuel Eto'o	Cameroon	(Spain) Barcelona	6
18	Gianluigi Buffon	Italy	(Italy) Juventus	5
19	Michael Ballack	Germany	(England) Chelsea	4
19	Cesc Fàbregas	Spain	(England) Arsenal	4
21	Didier Drogba	Ivory Coast	(England) Chelsea	3
21	Sergio Ramos	Spain	(Spain) Real Madrid	3
21	Nemanja Vidić	Serbia	(England) Manchester United	3
24	Edwin van der Sar	Netherlands	(England) Manchester United	2
24	Ruud van Nistelrooy	Netherlands	(Spain) Real Madrid	2
26	Karim Benzema	France	(France) Lyon	0
26	Pepe	Portugal	(Spain) Real Madrid	0
26	Luca Toni	Italy	(Germany) Bayern Munich	0
26	Rafael van der Vaart	Netherlands	(Germany) Hamburg (Spain) Real Madrid	0
26	Yuri Zhirkov	Russia	(Russia) CSKA Moscow	0
