= Norio Sasaki =

Japanese footballer and manager

Norio Sasaki 佐々木 則夫
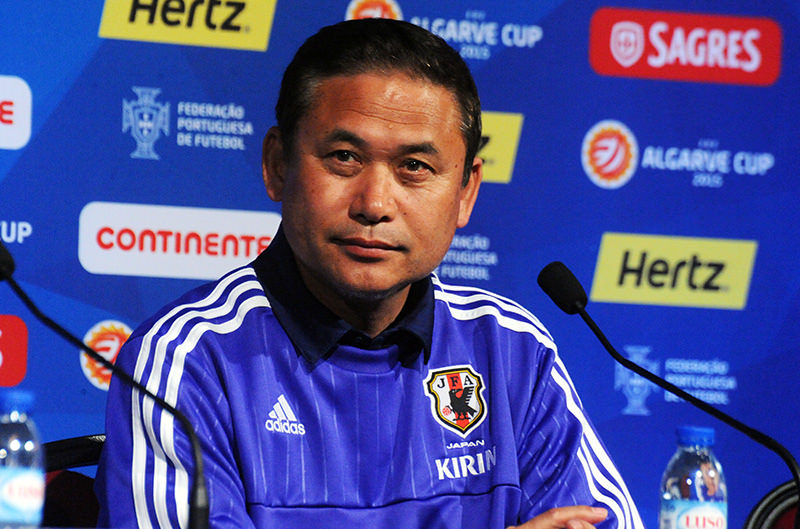
- Sasaki in 2015

Personal information
- Full name: Norio Sasaki
- Date of birth: 24 May 1958 (age 68)
- Place of birth: Obanazawa, Yamagata, Japan
- Height: 1.75 m (5 ft 9 in)
- Position: Midfielder

Youth career
- 1974–1976: Teikyo High School
- 1977–1980: Meiji University

Senior career*
Years	Team	Apps	(Gls)
1981–1991	NTT Kanto	25	(2)
Total		25	(2)

Managerial career
- 1997–1998: Omiya Ardija
- 2006: Japan women U-17
- 2007–2010: Japan women U-20
- 2008–2016: Japan women
- 2021: Omiya Ardija Ventus
- 2024: Japan women (interim)
Medal record
Representing Japan
Olympic Games
Silver medal – second place	2012 London	Team
FIFA Women's World Cup
Gold medal – first place	2011 Germany
Silver medal – second place	2015 Canada
AFC Women's Asian Cup
Gold medal – first place	2014 Vietnam
Bronze medal – third place	2008 Vietnam
Bronze medal – third place	2010 China
Asian Games
Gold medal – first place	2010 Guangzhou	Team
Silver medal – second place	2014 Incheon	Team
AFC U-19 Women's Championship
Gold medal – first place	2009 China
Silver medal – second place	2007 China
- * Club domestic league appearances and goals

Norio Sasaki (佐々木 則夫, Sasaki Norio; born 24 May 1958) is a Japanese football coach and former player. He is best known for leading the Japanese women's national team to their first and only FIFA Women's World Cup win in 2011 over the United States on penalty shootouts. He retired as head coach in March 2016 after eight years. Today, he is the coordinator of Nadeshiko Japan. Sasaki also coached the Japan women's U-20 national team starting in 2007.

== Playing career ==
Sasaki studied at and played for Teikyo High School and Meiji University. At Teikyo High School, he won the national inter-high school competition as team captain. His high school club also advanced to the semi-final at the All Japan High School Soccer Tournament.

After graduating from Meiji University, Sasaki started to work for Nippon Telegraph and Telephone and joined company club NTT Kanto. He was a midfielder/defender. He contributed to the club's promotion to Japan Soccer League Division 2 in 1986.

Sasaki retired from playing at the age of 33.

== Coaching career ==
Sasaki served as the head coach of Japan Football League side Omiya Ardija in 1998, then took various other positions at Omiya, including the youth team head-coach and the head of development.

In 2006, Sasaki became the assistant coach of Japan women's national football team, as well as the head coach of its U-20 team. In 2008, he was promoted to the head coach of the national team, succeeding Hiroshi Ohashi.

Under Sasaki's reign, Nadeshiko won the EAFF Women's Football Championship in 2008 and again in 2010. He also led the Japan Women to a fourth-place finish at the 2008 Summer Olympics in Beijing.

Sasaki and his team won the 2011 FIFA Women's World Cup, which upset host nation Germany and then Sweden to reach the tournament final, and beat the United States 3–1 in a penalty shoot-out in the final. Nadeshiko became the 19th recipient of Japan's People's Honour Award for winning the World Cup. On 9 January 2012, Sasaki was awarded the Women's Best Coach Award in the 2011 FIFA Ballon d'Or.

At the 2012 Summer Olympics, Sasaki led Japan to their first Olympic medal, a silver, after reaching the final but losing 2–1 to the United States in the final.

At the 2015 FIFA Women's World Cup in Canada, Sasaki, who attempted to become only the 2nd coach since Vittorio Pozzo's Italian team 77 years ago to win two FIFA World Cup finals, oversaw a 2nd-place effort, as the Japanese lost 5–2 to the US in the final.

At 2016 AFC Women's Olympic Qualifying Tournament, following Japan's failure to qualify for the 2016 Olympics in Brazil, Sasaki stepped down as head coach of the team. He was succeeded by Asako Takakura.

== Honours ==
=== Managerial honours ===
Japan Women

- EAFF Women's Football Championship: 2008, 2010
- Asian Games: 2010, Runner-up: 2014
- FIFA Women's World Cup: 2011, Runner-up: 2015
- Olympic Silver Medal: 2012
- AFC Women's Asian Cup: 2014

Individual

- AFC Coach of the Year: 2011
- FIFA World Women's Coach of the year: 2011
- Japan Football Hall of Fame: Inducted in 2019

Decorations

- People's Honour Award: 2011
