= Golden Globe (Portugal) for Best Sportsman =

Annual Portuguese sports award

The Golden Globe (Portugal) for Best Sportsman is awarded annually at the Golden Globes (Portugal) to the best Portuguese male athletes of the previous year.

== Winners ==
2010	2011	2012	2013	2014	2015	2016	2017	2018
Nelson Évora	Cristiano Ronaldo	Cristiano Ronaldo	Fernando Pimenta and Emanuel Silva	Cristiano Ronaldo	Cristiano Ronaldo	Cristiano Ronaldo	Cristiano Ronaldo	Cristiano Ronaldo
Athletics	Football	Football	Canoeing	Football	Football	Football	Football	Football
