= Jessica Goicoechea =

Spanish model and businesswoman (born 1996)

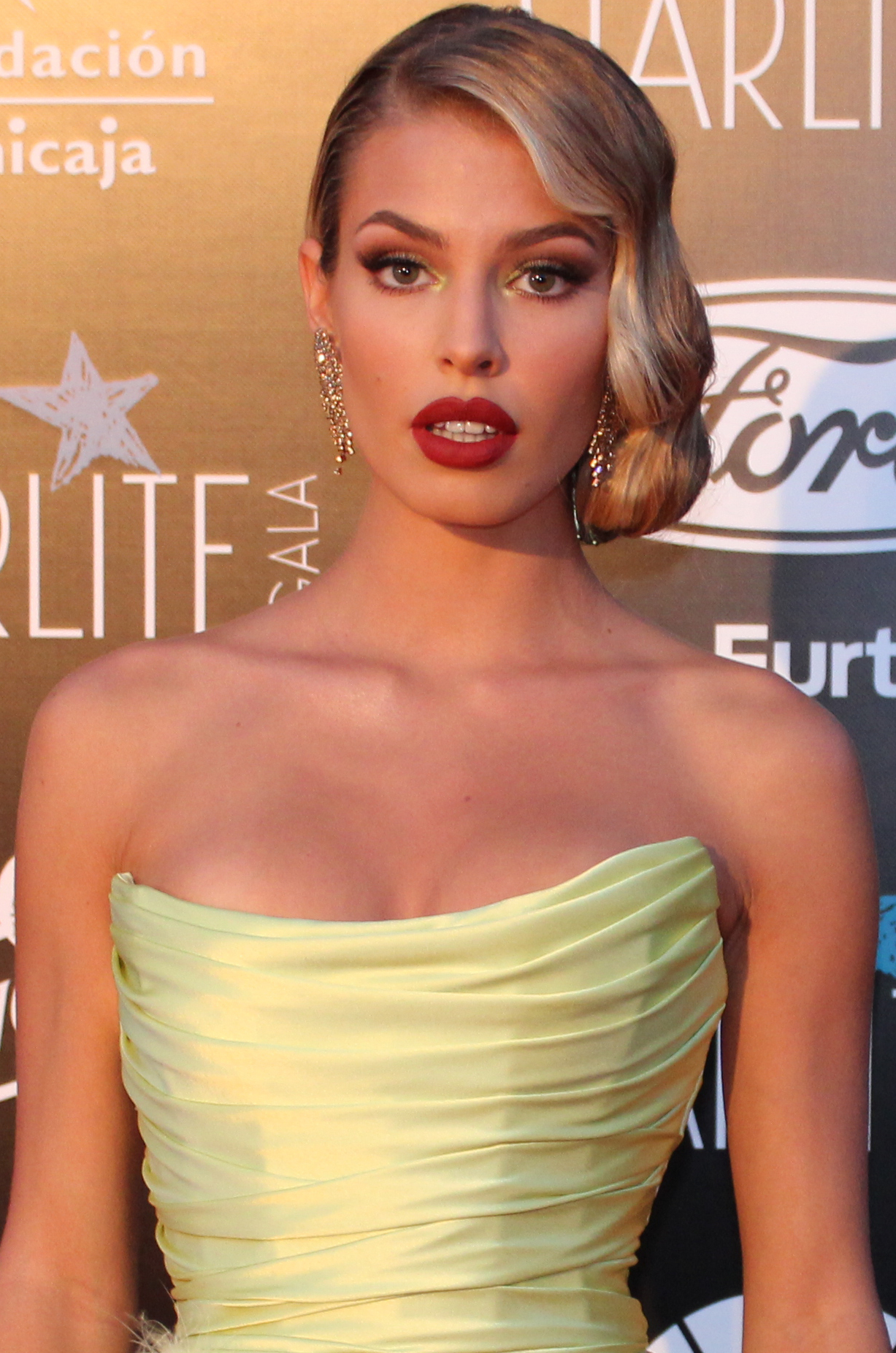
- Goicoechea in 2019
- Born: Jessica Goicoechea Jover; 22 November 1996 (age 29); Barcelona, Spain
- Occupations: Model; influencer; fashion designer; businesswoman

Jessica Goicoechea Jover (born 22 November 1996) is a Spanish model, influencer, fashion designer and businesswoman. Rejected by modelling agencies over her height, she built her career through Instagram and went on to work for brands such as Calvin Klein and Victoria's Secret; in 2019 she founded the fashion label Goi. In 2026 she was a finalist on the Antena 3 television contest El Desafío, and announced that the courts had ruled in her favour in a six-year gender violence case against her former partner, the model River Viiperi.

== Early life and career beginnings ==
Goicoechea was born in Barcelona on 22 November 1996 and began modelling at 15 with the 5th Avenue agency, but at 1.67 m she was rejected repeatedly over her height, including at a Victoria's Secret casting. She began posting her work on Instagram, which became her route into the fashion industry; agencies that had rejected her later asked to work with her.

== Modelling and film ==
Goicoechea went on to model for brands including Calvin Klein, Calzedonia, Puma and Rimmel, appeared in magazines such as Vogue, Elle and Esquire, and in 2017 featured in the music video for Manel Navarro's "Candle". That same year she made her acting debut in the short film La fantasía, by Daniel Maldonado.

== Goi ==
Goicoechea founded the fashion label Goi in 2019, at first as its sole partner with a single designer. Within two years the firm's daily sales rose from 600 to 2,700 euros, its staff grew to eight people and it was selling in more than 100 countries, with a third of revenue coming through Instagram. The Barcelona-based label, known for its swimwear, has received orders from Eva Longoria and from Lionel Messi for his wife Antonela Roccuzzo, while singers Aitana, Nathy Peluso and Rosalía have worn its designs. Goi has also faced criticism on social media that its bikinis cater only to slim bodies, which Goicoechea has rejected: she says the label makes sizes from XS to XL.

== Television ==
In 2026 Goicoechea competed in the sixth season of the Antena 3 television contest El Desafío and reached the grand final. She finished fourth with 202 points in the final, held on 27 March 2026 and won by Daniel Illescas.

== Personal life ==
In March 2020, during the COVID-19 lockdown in Spain, Goicoechea reported an assault by her partner and manager, the Ibiza-born model River Viiperi, to the Mossos d'Esquadra; officers found her with visible injuries and arrested him, and a duty court released him on charges. Viiperi, whose relationship with Goicoechea had become public in late 2017, denied the accusations. She later said the abuse during the relationship had been both physical and psychological. In March 2026 she announced that a court ruling had recognized the facts she had denounced, six years after the events.

In 2021 Goicoechea confirmed a relationship with the actor Arón Piper. They separated in January 2022 after almost two years together. In January 2023 the footballer Marc Bartra confirmed their relationship. After they broke up, Goicoechea confirmed a relationship with the rugby player Manu Moreno in February 2025.
