= Jorge Messi =

Argentine businessman and agent (1958–2026)

- Born: Jorge Horacio Messi; 1958; Rosario, Santa Fe, Argentina
- Died: 8 August 2026 (aged 68); Rosario, Santa Fe, Argentina
- Occupation: Sports agent
- Spouse: Celia María Cuccittini
- Children: 4, including Lionel
- Relatives: Antonela Roccuzzo (daughter-in-law)

Jorge Horacio Messi (1958 – 8 August 2026) was an Argentine businessman and sports agent. The father of Argentine professional footballer Lionel Messi, he was widely involved with supporting his early and professional career.

== Early life ==
Jorge Horacio Messi was born in 1958 in Rosario, Santa Fe Province, Argentina. Of Italian and Spanish descent, he grew up in Rosario, where he became interested in football from an early age. He played as a midfielder and was involved in the youth system of Newell's Old Boys. However, he gave up playing football in order to complete his compulsory military service.

After this period, he worked as a chemical technician and as an employee in the metallurgical industry. He worked in particular for the company Acindar, in the Rosario region. Alongside his employment, he remained involved in amateur football and coached youth teams.

== Career ==
=== Lionel Messi beginnings ===
Jorge played a role in his son Lionel Messi's early football development. In particular, he coached a youth team at Abanderado Grandoli, in the Las Heras neighborhood of Rosario. Lionel began playing football there at the age of four.

In an interview with Kicker magazine in 2013, Jorge recounted his son's early years at Grandoli and explained that he was one of his coaches at the time. He also described the initial difficulties related to covering Lionel's medical treatment and the family discussions that preceded his departure for Europe.

Lionel Messi then joined Newell's Old Boys, where he continued his development before his family sought a solution that would allow them to finance his medical treatment and pursue his football career.

=== Move to Barcelona ===
In 2000, when Lionel Messi was 13 years old, Jorge accompanied his son to Spain after Barcelona offered him the opportunity to join its training academy. He settled in Barcelona with Lionel to accompany him during his first months in Catalonia.

According to accounts reported by the sports press, Jorge played a role in supporting his son, particularly in his relations with the club and in negotiations concerning his career. The press also described the difficulties encountered by the father and son during their first years in Spain.

=== Representative of Lionel Messi ===
Jorge gradually became Lionel Messi's representative and participated in managing his professional and commercial interests. He was associated with Leo Messi Management, which manages activities related to the footballer's image, contracts, and economic interests.

Over the years, he participated in negotiations concerning his son's career and became a figure regularly approached by the media during transfer periods and contract negotiations.

His role as a representative extended in particular to different stages of Lionel Messi's career at Barcelona, Paris Saint-Germain, and Inter Miami respectively.

=== Legal proceedings in Spain ===
In 2013, Jorge Messi and Lionel Messi faced legal proceedings in Spain concerning the taxation of income derived from the footballer's image rights. Spanish authorities accused them of using corporate structures located in several countries to reduce their tax burden.

The case resulted in the conviction of Lionel Messi in 2016 and financial penalties. Jorge Messi was also convicted as part of the proceedings and was required to pay a fine.

In 2019, Jorge and Lionel Messi were also subject to new proceedings in Spain concerning allegations related to taxation and the financial management of certain interests of the footballer. The case was ultimately closed in 2021.

== Personal life ==
Jorge Messi was married to Celia María Cuccittini. The couple had four children, including Lionel Messi. He has three grandsons, Thiago, Mateo and Ciro, who were born to Lionel and his daughter-in-law Antonella Roccuzzo.

== Death ==
In 2026, Jorge's health had been reported to be deteriorated. In June, his family confirmed that he was experiencing health problems and asked the media to respect his privacy. An Argentine television presenter falsely reported Jorge had died during Argentina's opening game at 2026 FIFA World Cup. She later resigned from her position.

On 8 August 2026, Jorge died following a prolonged illness in his hometown of Rosario, Argentina, at a medical clinic at the age of 68. Many prominent footballers expressed their condolences, including Lionel's long-time rival Cristiano Ronaldo, Neymar, Ronaldo, Luis Suárez, and major football clubs worldwide. On 12 August, Lionel Messi published an open letter on Instagram paying tribute to his father. In the post, Lionel revealed an immense emotional toll of playing through the 2026 World Cup while his father's health deteriorated. Later by the time he returned home, Jorge's memory had faded so much that he believed Argentina had lost the final on penalties. Following that, he admitted that the death of his father left him with doubts about continuing his professional football career.
