= Lionel Messi =

Argentine footballer (born 1987)

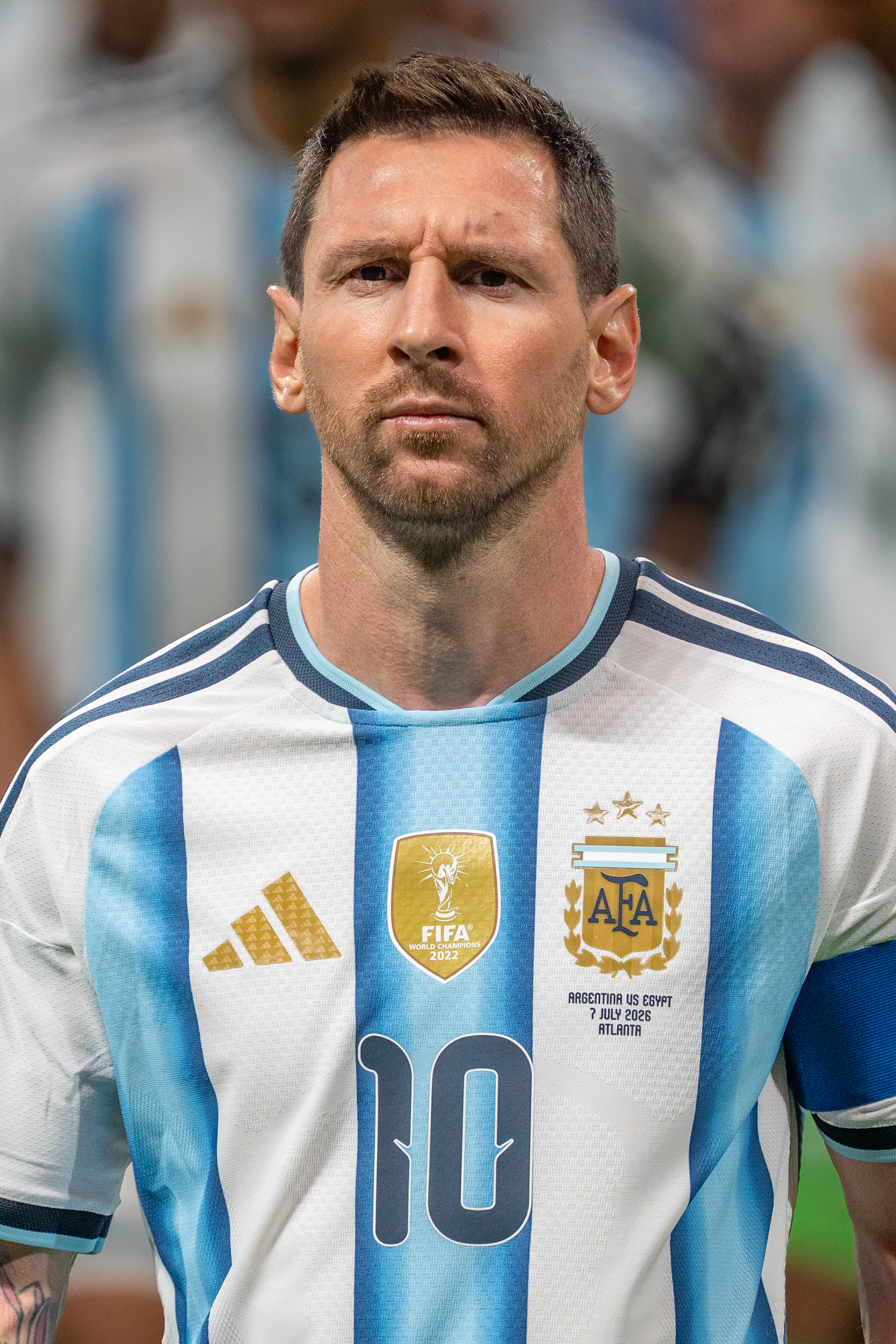
- Messi with Argentina in 2026

Personal information
- Full name: Lionel Andrés Messi
- Date of birth: 24 June 1987 (age 39)
- Place of birth: Rosario, Santa Fe, Argentina
- Height: 1.70 m (5 ft 7 in)
- Position: Forward

Team information
- Current team: Inter Miami
- Number: 10

Youth career
- 1992–1995: Abanderado Grandoli
- 1995–2000: Newell's Old Boys
- 2000–2004: Barcelona

Senior career*
Years	Team	Apps	(Gls)
2003–2004	Barcelona C	10	(5)
2004–2005	Barcelona B	22	(6)
2004–2021	Barcelona	520	(474)
2021–2023	Paris Saint-Germain	58	(22)
2023–	Inter Miami	84	(76)

International career
2004–2005	Argentina U20	18	(14)
2008	Argentina U23	5 (Note: Does not include an unofficial friendly match played on 24 May 2008 in Barcelona between Argentina U23 and the Catalonia national football team, as Catalonia is not affiliated with either FIFA or UEFA as a national member association and is therefore not allowed to participate in official competitions.)	(2)
2005–2026	Argentina	208	(126)
Medal record
Men's football
Representing Argentina
FIFA World Cup
Winner	2022 Qatar
Runner-up	2014 Brazil
Runner-up	2026 Canada–Mexico–US
Copa América
Winner	2021 Brazil
Winner	2024 United States
Runner-up	2007 Venezuela
Runner-up	2015 Chile
Runner-up	2016 United States
Third place	2019 Brazil
Finalissima
Winner	2022 England
Olympic Games
Gold medal – first place	2008 Beijing	Team
FIFA World Youth Championship
Winner	2005 Netherlands
South American U20 Championship
Third place	2005 Colombia
Website	messi.com
Signature
- * Club domestic league appearances and goals as of 03:21, 8 November 2026 (UTC)

Lionel Andrés "Leo" Messi (Note: Spanish: [ljoˈnel anˈdɾes ˈleo ˈmesi]. According to FCBarcelona.com, and his authorised biography, Messi by Guillem Balagué, his surname is "Messi", in accordance with Argentine customs. Other sources, including a 2014 document by FIFA, state his surname as "Messi Cuccittini". After winning a libel case in 2017, Messi's own management company stated: "The football player Lionel Andrés Messi Cuccittini has donated a total of €72,783.20 to the organisation Doctors Without Borders.") (born 24 June 1987) is an Argentine professional footballer who plays as a forward for and captains the Major League Soccer club Inter Miami. Widely regarded as one of the greatest players in history, he played for the Argentina national team for 21 years. During his career, he has set numerous records for individual accolades won, including eight Ballons d'Or, six European Golden Shoes, and being named the world's best player by FIFA eight times. (Note: Messi received France Football's 2009 Ballon d'Or and FIFA's 2009 FIFA World Player of the Year award, prior to their six-year merger; he proceeded to win the newly formed award, the FIFA Ballon d'Or, four times: 2010, 2011, 2012, 2015. Both organisations credited him with five (FIFA) Ballon d'Or awards. (Note: Attributed to multiple references:) He then went on to win the Ballon d'Or three more times – in 2019, 2021, 2023 – again solely assigned by France Football, and won the newly established The Best FIFA Men's Player three times as well – in 2019, 2022 and 2023. France Football recognises him as a record eight-time Ballon d'Or winner and FIFA recognises him as a record eight-time world's best player.) Messi was named the Laureus World Sportsman of the Year in 2020 and 2023, and was named the All Time Men's World Best Player by the IFFHS in 2025. He was among Time's 100 most influential people in the world in 2011, 2012, and 2023.

Messi is the most decorated player in the history of professional football, having won 47 team trophies (Note: According to FC Barcelona, FIFA, the Royal Spanish Football Federation, and multiple media outlets, Messi also won the 2005 Supercopa de España, bringing his Barcelona trophy total to 35. However, this particular trophy is not credited here since Messi was out of the squad and did not feature in either of the two matches against Real Betis. Similarly, Messi and Inter Miami were awarded a trophy for winning the Eastern Conference title during the 2025 MLS Cup playoffs. However, this trophy is not officially recognized by FIFA, so it is not credited here. For the aforementioned reasons, sources disagree on Messi's total number of accolades, ranging from 47 to 49 official career trophies.) across more than 1,200 career appearances. He has scored over 930 senior career goals and provided over 420 assists for club and country, making him the second-highest goalscorer and the highest assist provider in the history of football. He was ranked as the world's highest-paid athlete by Forbes in 2019 and 2022. In 2020, he became the second footballer to surpass $1 billion in career earnings.

In 2004, Messi made his professional debut for the La Liga club Barcelona at age 17. He was awarded the FIFPRO Young Player of the Year in 2006, 2007 and 2008. During the 2008–09 season, he helped Barcelona achieve the first treble in Spanish football, earning him the first of four consecutive Ballons d'Or. By the 2011–12 season he had set the European record for most goals in a season and was Barcelona's all-time top scorer. During the 2014–15 season, Messi was part of the attacking trio MSN with Luis Suárez and Neymar, and helped Barcelona achieve a historic second treble.

Messi was named Barcelona's captain in 2018. While playing for the club, he won a club-record 34 trophies, including 10 La Liga titles and four UEFA Champions Leagues. With Barcelona, he set records for most goals for a single club (672) and most goals in La Liga (474). Financial difficulties at Barcelona forced Messi to depart in 2021 and sign with Ligue 1 club Paris Saint-Germain, where he won the Ligue 1 title twice. He joined the MLS club Inter Miami in 2023 and led them to their first MLS Cup victory in 2025, while also winning the league MVP award in 2024 and 2025. Following his arrival and impact on football in the United States, Messi was named Time's Athlete of the Year in 2023 and was awarded the Presidential Medal of Freedom by US president Joe Biden in 2025.

Messi is the all-time leading goalscorer (126) and most-capped player (208) of the Argentina national team. Several years after his senior debut in 2005, he won the gold medal at the 2008 Summer Olympics. Assuming captaincy in 2011, he led Argentina to the finals of the 2014 World Cup, the 2015 Copa América, and the 2016 Copa América Centenario, all of which they lost. He subsequently announced his retirement from international football, but returned soon after. He then led Argentina to victory at the 2021 Copa América, the 2022 World Cup, and the 2024 Copa América. He led Argentina to their second consecutive World Cup final at the 2026 World Cup, where he won the Silver Ball and his second consecutive Silver Boot. Messi retired from international football for a second time in October 2026.

== Early life ==
Lionel Andrés Messi was born on 24 June 1987 in Rosario, Santa Fe Province, Argentina. His father, Jorge Messi (1958–2026), was the head of department at an Acindar pressed steel manufacturing plant in Villa Constitución. His mother, Celia Cuccittini, worked in a magnet manufacturing workshop. Messi's parents met as youngsters in the Las Heras district of Rosario, where Messi would later grow up. Jorge and Celia married in 1978, after Jorge completed military service in the Argentine Armed Forces. On his father's side, Messi is of Italian and Spanish descent, the great-grandson of immigrants from the Marche region of Italy (with his surname coming from Porto Recanati), and on his mother's side he has primarily Italian ancestry. Growing up in a tight-knit, football-loving family, "Leo" developed a passion for the sport from an early age, playing constantly with his older brothers, Rodrigo and Matías, and his cousins, Maximiliano and Emanuel Biancucchi, both of whom later became professional footballers. Messi also has a younger sister, María Sol.

At the age of four, Messi joined the local football club Abanderado Grandoli where he was coached by his father. His maternal grandmother, Celia, accompanied him to training and matches. He was greatly affected by her death, shortly before his eleventh birthday. Since then, as a devout Catholic, he has celebrated his goals by looking up and pointing to the sky in tribute to his grandmother. Messi has a general understanding of English but cannot speak it fluently, and has expressed regret for refusing to learn the language during his childhood.

== Youth career ==
=== Newell's Old Boys ===
"When you saw him you would think: this kid can't play ball. He's a dwarf, he's too fragile, too small. But immediately you'd realise that he was born different, that he was a phenomenon."

— Newell's Old Boys youth coach Adrián Coria, sharing his first impression of the 12-year-old Messi

Messi started playing for the Rosario-based football club Newell's Old Boys when he was seven years old; he would become a lifelong supporter of the club. During the six years he played for Newell's, he scored almost 500 goals, and was a member of "The Machine of '87", a nearly unbeatable youth team named for the year of their birth. Messi regularly entertained crowds by performing ball tricks during half-time, when the Newell's first team played home games. (Note: Attributed to multiple references:) His goalscoring idol growing up was Brazilian striker Ronaldo, who Messi called "the best forward I've ever seen".

Messi's future as a professional player was threatened when, at the age of 10, he was diagnosed with a growth hormone deficiency. He began growth hormone therapy at age 11; however, his father's health insurance covered only two years of the therapy, which cost at least 1,000 pesos per month. Newell's agreed to contribute, but later reneged on their promise. Messi was scouted by the Buenos Aires club River Plate, whose playmaker Pablo Aimar he idolised. It was speculated for a time that Messi failed to sign with River Plate due to his ill health; however, in a 2019 interview, he revealed that River Plate had wanted to sign him after he scored four goals at a trial, and even offered to pay for his medical treatment, but Newell's refused to release his player card, preventing the transfer.

=== Barcelona ===
As the Messi family had relatives in Catalonia, they sought to arrange a trial with Barcelona in September 2000, when Messi was 13. First-team director Carles Rexach immediately wanted to sign him, but the board of directors hesitated; at the time it was highly unusual for European clubs to sign foreign players of such a young age. On 14 December, an ultimatum was issued for Barcelona to prove their commitment, and Rexach, with no other paper at hand, wrote a contract on a paper napkin. In February 2001, Messi's family relocated to Barcelona, where they moved into an apartment near the club's stadium, Camp Nou.

During his first year in Spain, Messi rarely played with the Infantiles due to a transfer conflict with Newell's; as a foreigner, he could only be fielded in friendlies and the Catalan league. Without football, he struggled to integrate into the team. He was reserved by nature, and was so quiet that some of his teammates initially believed he was mute. At home, he suffered from homesickness after his mother moved back to Rosario with his brothers and younger sister, María Sol, while he stayed in Barcelona with his father. (Note: Attributed to multiple references:)

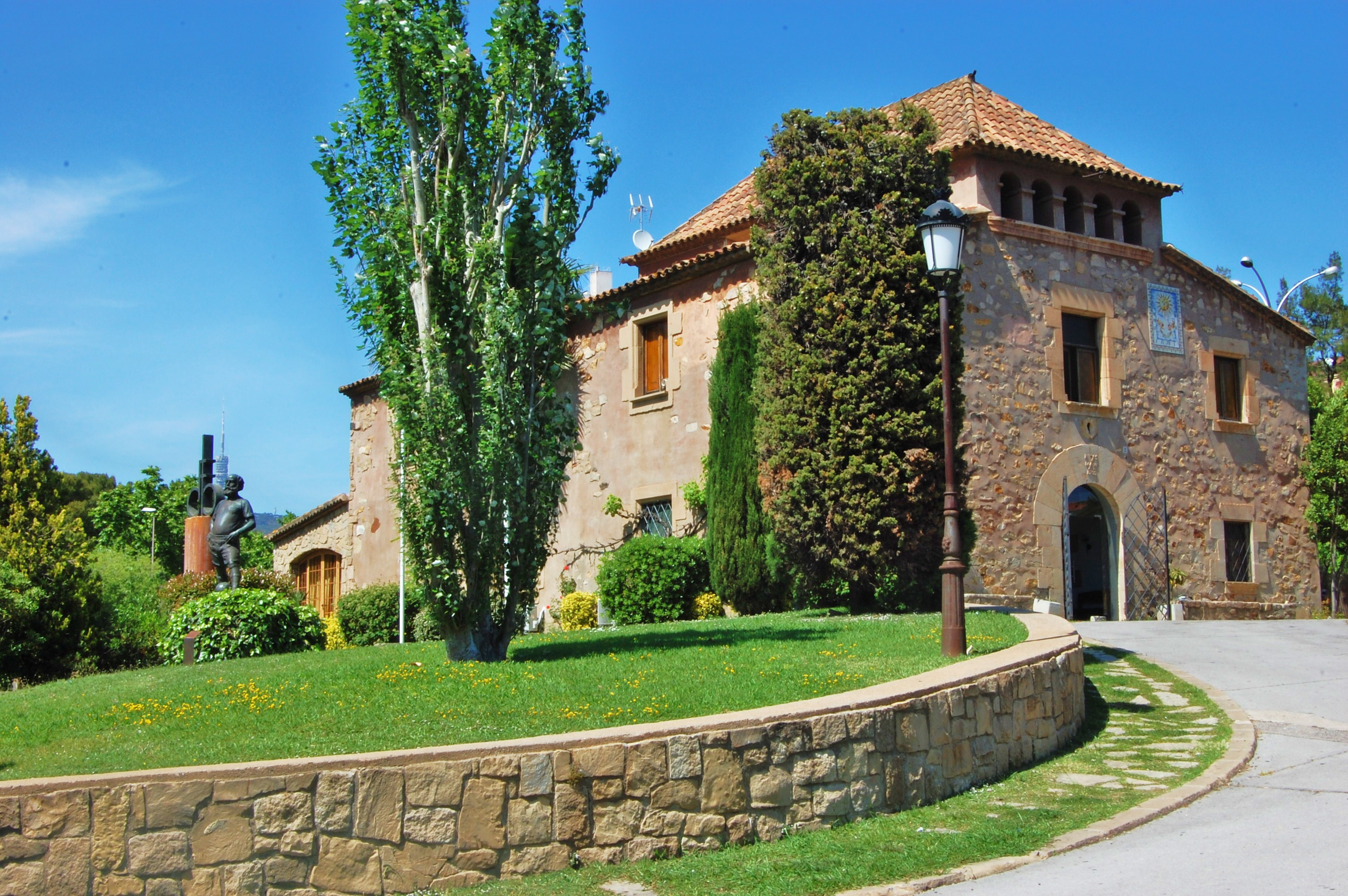
At age 13, Messi enrolled at Barcelona's youth academy, La Masia.

After a year at Barcelona's youth academy, La Masia, Messi was enrolled in the Royal Spanish Football Federation (RFEF) in February 2002. He could now play in all competitions, and he quickly befriended his teammates, including Cesc Fàbregas and Gerard Piqué. After completing his growth hormone therapy at age 14, Messi became an integral part of the "Baby Dream Team", which has been lauded as Barcelona's greatest-ever youth team. During his first full season (2002–03), he was the top scorer with 36 goals in 30 games for the Cadetes A, who won an unprecedented treble of the league, the Spanish cup, and the Copa Catalunya. In the Copa Catalunya final, their 4–1 victory over Espanyol came to be referred to in club lore as the partido de la máscara, the "final of the mask". A week after suffering a broken cheekbone during a league match, Messi was allowed to play on the condition that he wear a protective plastic mask. When the mask became a hindrance, Messi took it off and scored two goals within 10 minutes. At the end of the season, he received an offer to join the English football club Arsenal, but he chose to remain in Barcelona. (Note: Attributed to multiple references:)

Messi continued to progress through his club's ranks at a rapid pace, debuting for four youth teams during the 2003–04 season. After being named player of the tournament in four separate international pre-season competitions with the Juvenil B, he played only one official match with the team before being promoted to the Juvenil A. In the Juvenil A he scored 18 goals in 11 league games. During the international break, Messi was one of several youth players called up to strengthen the depleted first team. Ludovic Giuly, one of Barcelona's wingers, described Messi's performance during a training session: "He destroyed us all ... He would dribble past four players and score a goal. Even the team's starting centre-backs were nervous ... He was an alien."

At 16 years old, Messi made his first-team debut when he came on in the 75th minute during a friendly against FC Porto on 16 November 2003. His performance impressed the technical staff, and he subsequently began training daily with the club's reserve team, Barcelona B, as well as weekly with the first team. After Messi's first training session with the senior squad, Barcelona's new star player Ronaldinho told his teammates that he believed the 16-year-old would become an even better player than himself. Ronaldinho called Messi "little brother", and his friendship greatly eased Messi's transition onto the first team.

To gain further match experience, Messi joined his club's third team, Barcelona C, in addition to the Juvenil A. He helped save the third team from the relegation zone of the Tercera División, scoring five goals in ten games, including a hat-trick in eight minutes during a Copa del Rey Juvenil match. His progress was reflected in his first professional contract, signed on 4 February 2004, which lasted until 2012 and contained an initial buyout clause of €30 million. A month later, he made his debut for Barcelona B in the Segunda División B, and his buyout clause automatically increased to €80 million. He played five games with the B team that season but did not score. He was physically weaker than his opponents, who were often much older and taller, and he worked on increasing his muscle mass and overall strength. Towards the end of the season, he returned to both youth teams, helping the Juvenil B win the league. He finished the campaign having scored goals for four of his five teams, with a total of 36 goals in all official competitions.

== Club career ==
=== Barcelona ===
==== 2004–2008: Rise to the first team ====
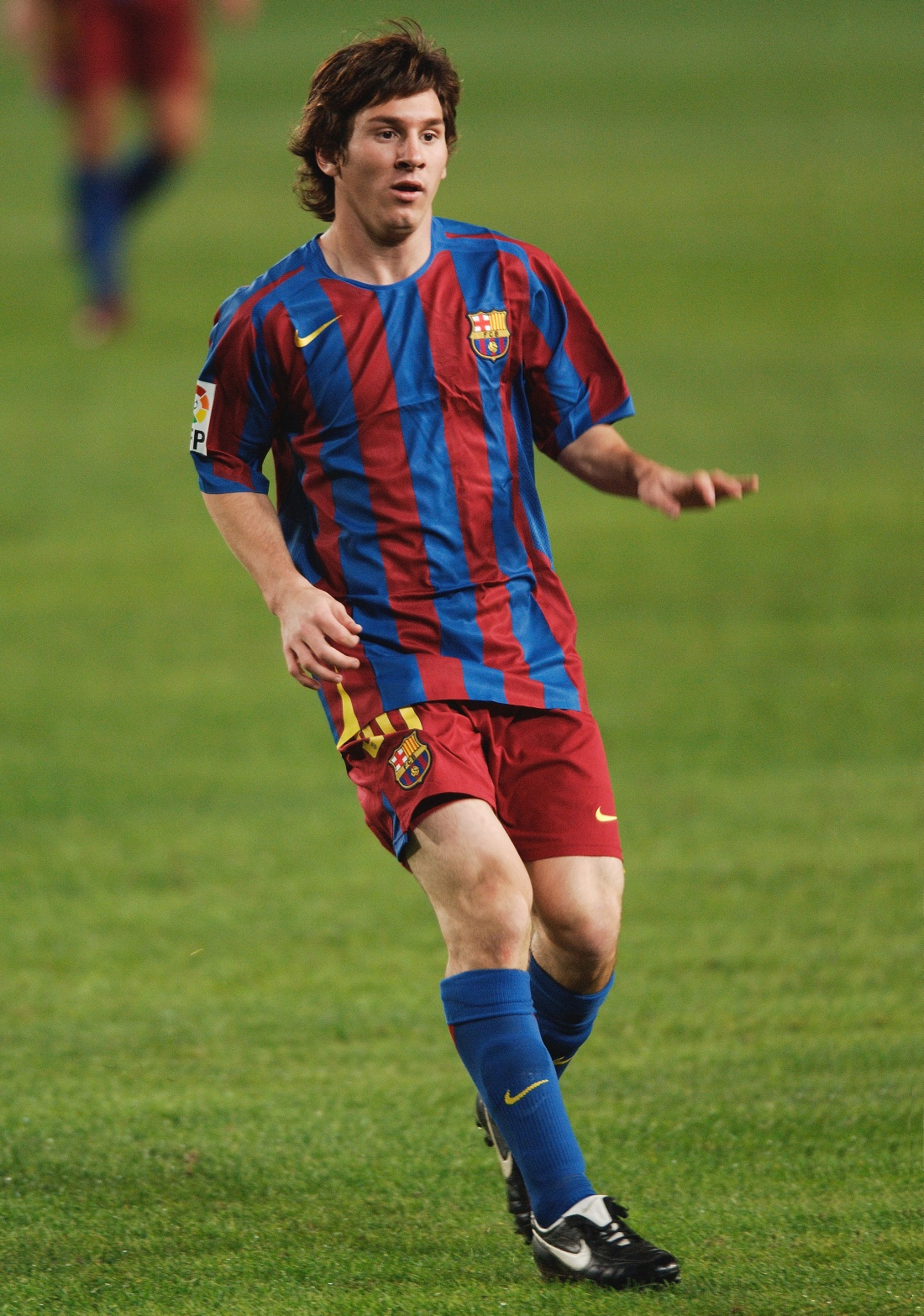
In 2004, Messi (pictured in 2005) began his 17-year professional career with FC Barcelona.

Messi began the 2004–05 season as a guaranteed starter for the Barcelona B team, but after some lobbying by the senior players, he was promoted to the first team by manager Frank Rijkaard. He made his La Liga debut for Barcelona on 16 October 2004, at 17 years old. He scored his first senior goal on 1 May 2005, becoming the youngest-ever scorer for the club at the time. He was at that time the youngest player to represent Barcelona in an official competition, and the club won the league title during that season.

On his 18th birthday, Messi signed his first contract as a senior team player, which kept him with Barcelona through 2010, and had a release clause of €150 million. Three months later, as his performance continued to make waves, his contract was updated to double his salary and keep him with the club until 2014. By the end of the 2005–06 season, Barcelona had won La Liga again as well as the UEFA Champions League.

During the 2006–07 season, Messi scored his first hat-trick during a game against Real Madrid, becoming the first player to score a hat-trick in a Clásico in 12 years. Two goals scored by Messi against Getafe and Espanyol during the season drew notice for their similarities to two famous goals scored by fellow Argentine Diego Maradona in the 1986 World Cup match against England, leading to comparisons between Messi and Maradona that would endure throughout Messi's career. (Note: Attributed to multiple references:) Barcelona finished the 2006–07 season with only one trophy – the 2006 Supercopa de España – and the 2007–08 season without a single trophy, leading to Rijkaard's departure.

==== 2008–2012: Success under Pep Guardiola ====
At the beginning of the 2008–09 season – his first under Barcelona's new manager, former captain Pep Guardiola – Messi was given the number 10 shirt. Over time, he effectively became the tactical focal point of Guardiola's strategy, increasing his goalscoring rate as a result. During that season, Messi scored 38 goals, and alongside Samuel Eto'o and Thierry Henry, contributed to a total of 100 goals in all competitions, a record at the time for the club. Messi played in his first final as Barcelona won the Copa del Rey. Barcelona also won the La Liga title and the Champions League, thus achieving the first treble in the history of Spanish football.

During the first half of the 2009–10 season, Barcelona won the Supercopa de España, the UEFA Super Cup and the FIFA Club World Cup, becoming the first club to achieve the sextuple. Messi finished as the Champions League top scorer, the youngest in the tournament's history. For his efforts in 2009, Messi won the Ballon d'Or, the FIFA World Player of the Year award and his first European Golden Shoe. (Note: Attributed to multiple references:) He scored a total of 47 goals in all competitions, equalling Ronaldo's club record from the 1996–97 campaign. He signed a new 7-year contract with Barcelona through 2016.

During the 2010–11 season, Barcelona won the Supercopa de España, the Champions League, and a third consecutive La Liga title. Messi's club performances in 2010 earned him his second consecutive Ballon d'Or. He was the top scorer in the Champions League for the third consecutive year, and the league's top scorer and assist provider. He became Barcelona's all-time single-season top scorer with 53 goals. (Note: Attributed to multiple references:) During the 2011–12 season, Barcelona won both the Spanish and European Super Cup trophies, as well as the FIFA Club World Cup. (Note: Attributed to multiple references:) Messi won the Golden Ball for the second time and the Ballon d'Or for the third time, as well as the inaugural UEFA Best Player in Europe Award. During 2012, Messi became the second player to be top scorer in four Champions League campaigns. He became the top goalscorer in Barcelona's history at age 24, overtaking César Rodríguez's 57-year record of 232 goals. He finished the season as the league top scorer in Spain for the second time with 50 goals, a La Liga record. His 73 goals in all competitions made him the single-season top scorer in the history of European club football excluding regional and local competitions. Barcelona won the Copa del Rey that season, their 14th trophy under Guardiola, who resigned after a four-year cycle of success.

==== 2012–2014: Record-breaking year and Messidependencia ====
For the start of the 2012–13 season, Barcelona had virtually secured their La Liga title by the start of 2013. A double scored against Real Betis saw Messi becoming Barcelona's all-time top scorer in La Liga, and surpassed Gerd Müller's record of most goals scored in a calendar year; Messi scored a record 91 goals in all competitions for Barcelona and Argentina throughout 2012. Messi again won the FIFA Ballon d'Or, becoming the first player in history to win the Ballon d'Or four times. He signed a new contract committing himself to the club through 2018, and wore the captain's armband for the first time in a league match against Rayo Vallecano. (Note: Attributed to multiple references:) The team won La Liga again that year, Messi's sixth, equalling Real Madrid's 100-point record of the previous season. With 60 goals in all competitions, including 46 goals in La Liga, he finished the campaign as league top scorer in Spain and Europe for the second consecutive year, becoming the first player in history to win the European Golden Shoe three times.

Messi's overall input into the team's attack had increased significantly. Whereas he contributed to 24% of the team's goals in their treble-winning campaign in 2008–09, this number rose to more than 40% by the end of the 2012–13 season. These statistics, as well as lopsided losses in the Champions League where Messi was unfit, gave credence to the notion of Messidependencia, Barcelona's perceived tactical and psychological dependence on their star player.

To offset the load on Messi, Barcelona signed Brazilian forward Neymar from Santos before the 2013–14 season. The team won the Supercopa de España at the beginning of the season. Messi finished the campaign with his worst output in five seasons, though he still managed to score 41 goals in all competitions. For the first time in five years, Barcelona ended the season without a major trophy.

==== 2014–2017: Arrival of Luis Enrique and birth of MSN ====
Barcelona hired coach Luis Enrique before the 2014–15 season, and continued to aid Messi in the attack by signing Uruguayan forward Luis Suárez, who had won the European Golden Shoe with Liverpool the previous year. Luis Enrique's system featured quick transitions from defence to attack, led by the forwards Messi, Suárez and Neymar. The attacking trio, which colloquially became known as MSN, broke goalscoring records. With Messi in the right wing position, Suárez in the middle, and Neymar in the left wing position, the trio were able to create a "symbiotic" relationship in which Suárez was a relentless runner, Messi was at the centre of play orchestration, and Neymar was an explosive and creative threat.

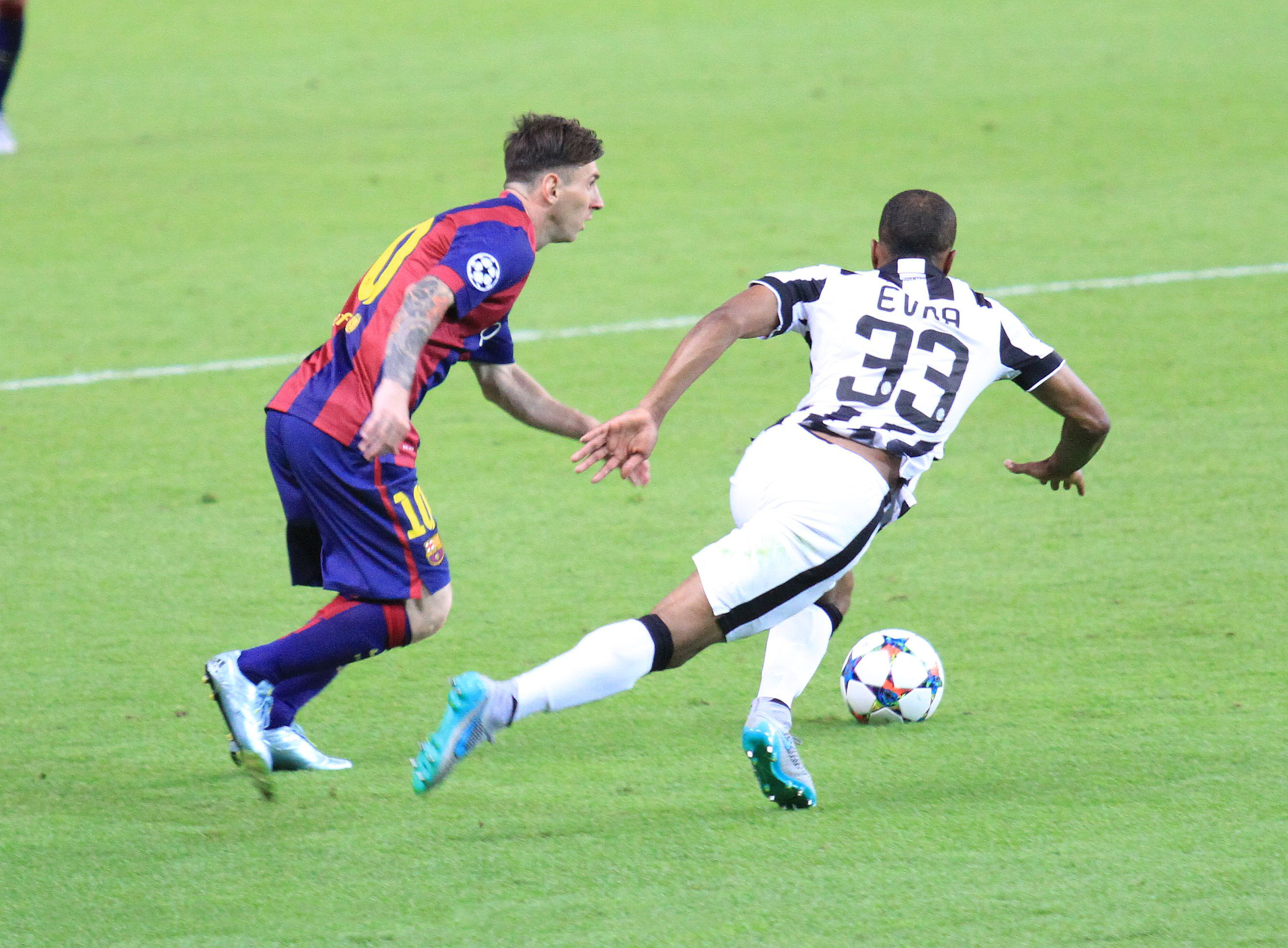
Messi dribbling past Patrice Evra of Juventus during the 2015 UEFA Champions League final

A hat-trick by Messi against Sevilla in November 2014 made him the all-time top scorer in La Liga, as he surpassed the 59-year record of 251 league goals held by Telmo Zarra. After securing the La Liga title, the Copa del Rey, and the Champions League that year, Messi helped Barcelona become the first club to win the continental treble twice. Messi recorded 58 goals during the season, while the MSN trio scored a total of 122 goals in all competitions, a record in Spanish football.

Messi opened the 2015–16 season by helping Barcelona defeat Sevilla in the UEFA Super Cup. He finished 2015 by winning the FIFA Club World Cup, defeating River Plate in the final and collecting his fifth club trophy of the calendar year. In January 2016, he won the FIFA Ballon d'Or for a record fifth time in his career, and he finished the season by winning both La Liga and the Copa del Rey again. Messi scored 41 goals during the season, while the MSN trio scored a total of 131 goals, breaking the record they had set the previous season.

The 2016–17 season ended with Barcelona winning the Supercopa de España and the Copa del Rey. Messi finished the season with 54 goals, while his 37 goals in La Liga saw him claim both the Pichichi and European Golden Shoe Awards for the fourth time in his career. MSN came to be regarded as one of the greatest attacking trios in the game, (Note: According to:) and ended with Neymar's August 2017 transfer to Paris Saint-Germain.

==== 2017–2021: Final years at Barcelona ====
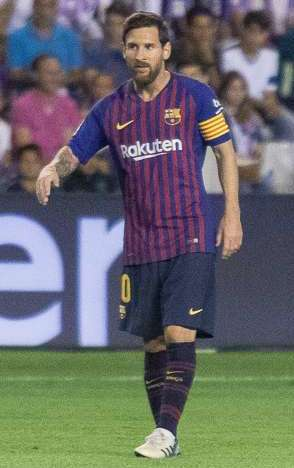
Messi, wearing the captain's armband, against Real Valladolid in 2018

Messi signed a new deal with Barcelona on 25 November 2017, keeping him with the club through 2021. The 2017–18 season saw Barcelona winning La Liga and the Copa del Rey once again. Messi again finished the season as the top scorer in La Liga, with 34 goals, and won his fifth European Golden Shoe award. With the departure of captain Andrés Iniesta in May 2018, Messi was named the team's new captain for the 2018–19 season. He lifted his first trophy as Barcelona's captain, the Supercopa de España, following a 2–1 victory over Sevilla. He also helped Barcelona clinch the La Liga title. With 36 goals in 34 appearances that season, Messi won his sixth La Liga Golden Shoe trophy. He also captured his sixth European Golden Shoe award, setting a record for winning the award three seasons in a row.

Messi won his sixth Ballon d'Or, but the subsequent 2019–20 season saw Barcelona go trophyless for the first time since 2007–08. Following a disappointing season, Messi expressed to the club his desire to leave, but ultimately decided to fulfill the final year of his contract. In 2021, he led Barcelona to victory in the Copa del Rey. His last two seasons with Barcelona saw him lead La Liga in goal scoring, giving him a record-breaking total of eight Pichichi trophies. With 30 goals in the 2020–21 La Liga campaign and a triumph with Argentina at the 2021 Copa América, where he was jointly named Best Player and won the Golden Boot, Messi was awarded the 2021 Ballon d'Or.

Although Messi became a free agent after his contract expired, he expressed his intention to stay with Barcelona, even though the club was facing significant financial challenges due in part to the COVID-19 pandemic. Following initial progress in contract negotiations, Messi intended to sign a new contract with a 50% salary cut, but Barcelona announced that they could not re-sign him, citing financial constraints and structural obstacles posed by La Liga regulations. On 8 August 2021, Messi held a tearful press conference at Camp Nou, confirming that he would leave the club.

=== Paris Saint-Germain ===
==== 2021–2023: 7th Ballon d'Or and consecutive Ligue 1 titles ====
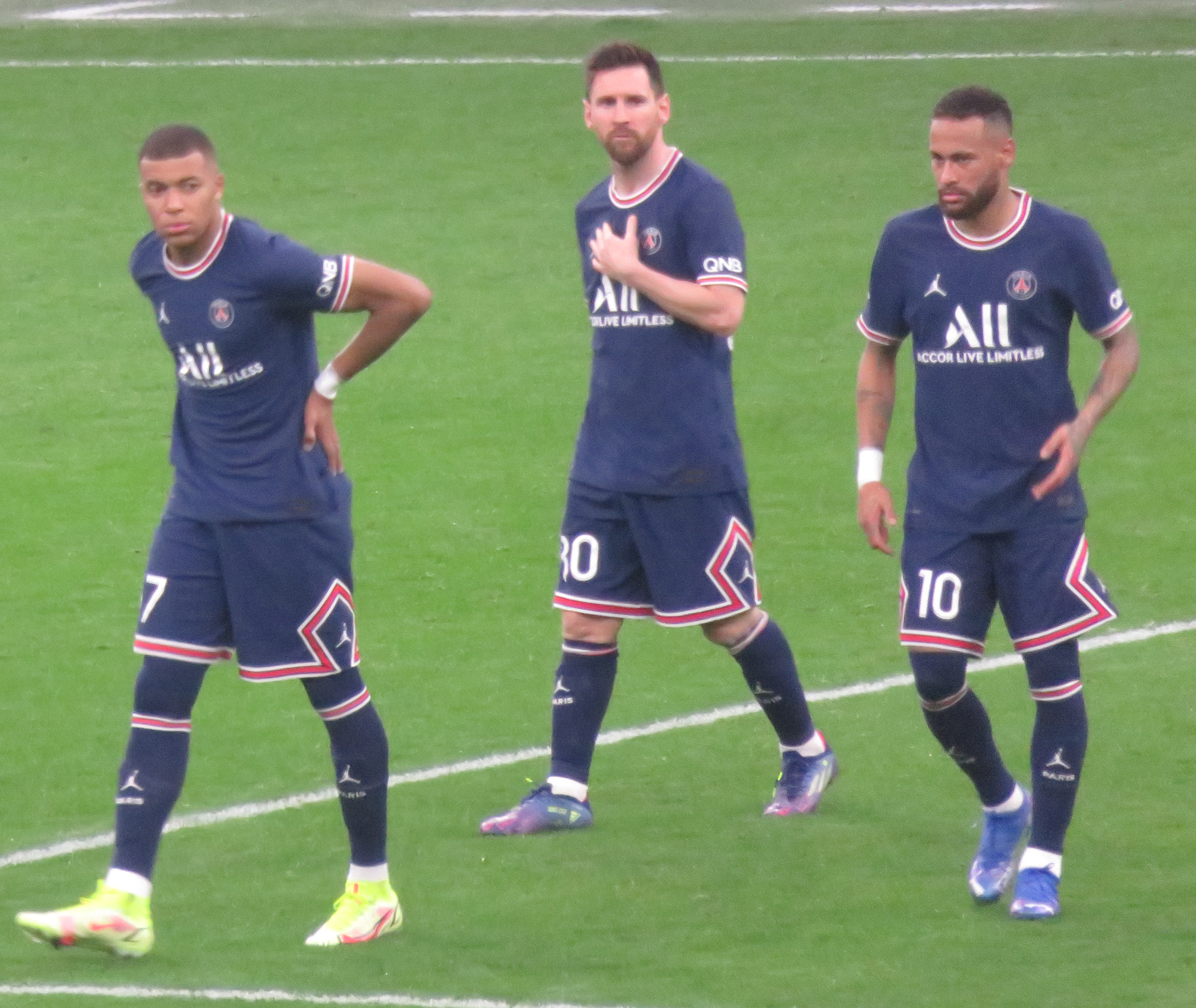
Messi (middle) with Paris Saint-Germain teammates Kylian Mbappé (left) and Neymar in 2021

On 10 August 2021, two days after his farewell remarks to Barcelona, Messi joined the Ligue 1 club Paris Saint-Germain (PSG) on a two-year contract with an option for an extra year. He chose 30 as his squad number, which is the number he wore when he made his senior debut for Barcelona. He scored his first goal for the club in a Champions League group stage win over former manager Pep Guardiola's Manchester City. Messi won his first Ligue 1 title, which was a recording-tying 10th league title for PSG. Overall, he had an underwhelming season, scoring 6 goals in the league.

Near the start of the 2022–23 season, Messi won his second trophy with PSG in the Trophée des Champions. A goal against Nice saw him surpass Cristiano Ronaldo as the all-time highest goalscorer in European club football with 702 goals; during the match, he also achieved 1,000 career goal contributions (goals scored and assists served) at the club level. By the end of the Ligue 1 season, he had scored 16 goals and had the highest number of assists with 16, which helped PSG clinch their 11th Ligue 1 title and Messi's second in a row. (Note: Attributed to multiple references:) Messi was awarded the Ligue 1 Best Foreign Player of the Season and was recognised as the season's best player in Europe, according to Opta data. At the end of the season, he departed PSG.

=== Inter Miami ===
==== 2023–present: 8th Ballon d'Or, all-time assists record and MLS champion ====
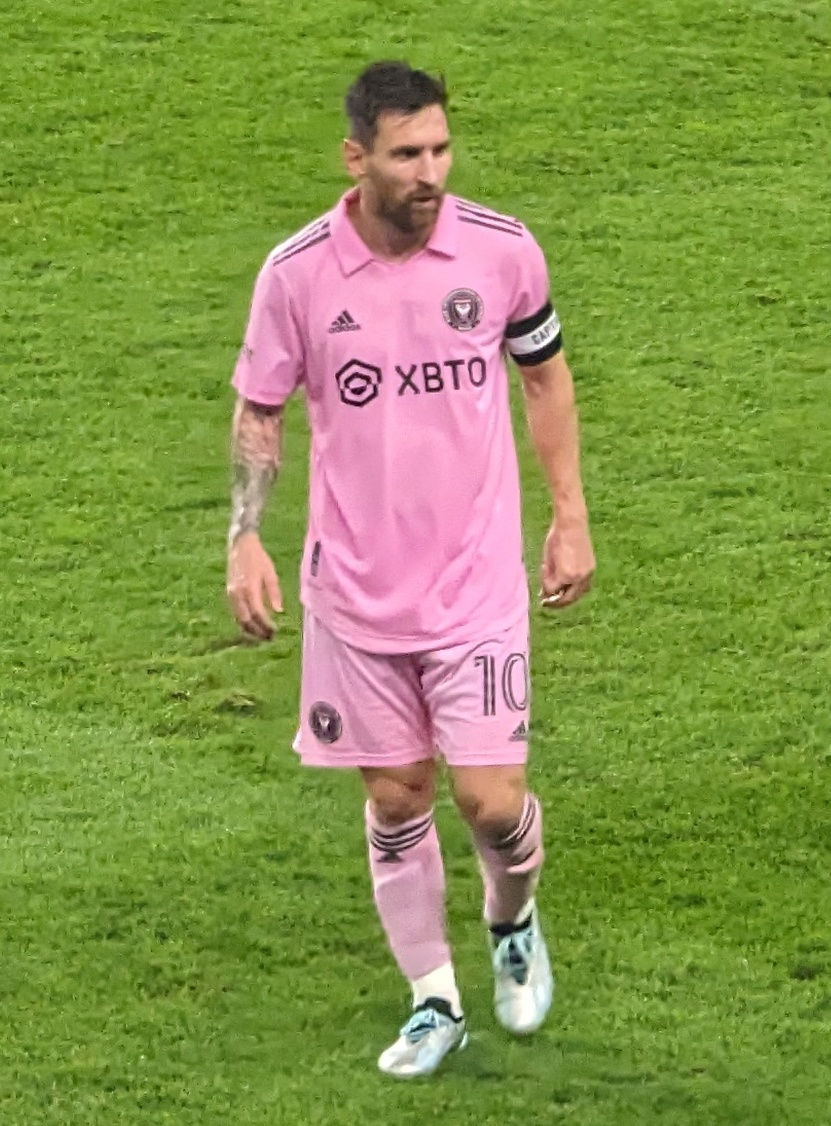
Messi with Inter Miami during the 2023 U.S. Open Cup

On 15 July 2023, the Major League Soccer (MLS) club Inter Miami CF announced the signing of Messi on a two-and-a-half-year contract. Messi's pay set an MLS record, with his earnings from salary, signing bonus, and an equity stake in the club reportedly surpassing $50 million. According to Goal, Messi's arrival in the United States helped to raise the profile of MLS within the US and abroad. Inter Miami co-president Xavier Asensi said that for MLS "there is a before and after Messi. He has changed everything."

After Messi joined Inter Miami, the club's games began selling out. The frenzy over his arrival was dubbed "Messimania", and Inter Miami's No. 10 Messi jersey became the best-selling jersey in the league, and nearly the best-selling in the world. Messi was made the team captain of his new club, and began the 2023 season by scoring nine goals in his first six games. He led Inter Miami to their first-ever trophy as they defeated Nashville SC in the Leagues Cup final. Miami missed the MLS playoffs, however, finishing second to last in the Eastern Conference. On 30 October 2023, following his World Cup win with Argentina and Ligue 1 trophy with Paris Saint-Germain, Messi was awarded a record eighth Ballon d'Or. He was also named Time Athlete of the Year, the first footballer ever to win the award.

During the 2024 season, Messi broke the record for the most assists in a single MLS game with five assists. On 2 October, he scored two goals in a 3–2 win over the Columbus Crew, clinching the Supporters' Shield award for Miami. In the final game of the season, Messi scored his first hat-trick for the club in a 6–2 victory. Miami finished the regular season with 74 points, an MLS league record, while Messi finished with 20 goals and 16 assists in 19 matches, becoming the all-time top goalscorer for the young team. Miami made their first postseason appearance in the 2024 MLS Cup playoffs but was eliminated in the first round. Messi was named the MLS Most Valuable Player for the season.

During the 2025 season, Messi became the fastest player in MLS history to reach 40 league goals. He ended the season by winning the MLS Golden Boot as the league's top scorer, with 29 goals and 19 assists in 28 games. In October 2025, he signed a contract extension with Miami through 2028. During the Eastern Conference final against New York City FC in the 2025 MLS Cup playoffs, an assist from Messi brought his total career assists to 405, which saw him surpass Ferenc Puskás for the most career assists of all time. Messi led Miami to MLS Cup 2025, where they defeated the Vancouver Whitecaps 3–1 to win their first league championship. Messi provided two assists during the match and was named MLS Cup MVP. At the end of the season, he was again named MLS MVP, becoming the first player in league history to win the award two years in a row.

In March 2026 it was reported that Messi was earning between $70 and $80 million per year from Inter Miami from his compensation and equity rights. On 18 March, Messi became the second player to score 900 career goals during Miami's 1–1 draw with Nashville in the CONCACAF Champions Cup. On 16 September, he scored his 100th goal for Miami as they defeated Cruz Azul in the 2026 Campeones Cup.

== International career ==
As a citizen of both Argentina and Spain, Messi was eligible to play for both national teams. He began his international career in 2004 with Argentina's U20 team, and was subsequently included in the squad for the 2005 South American U-20 Championship, in which they finished third. Messi then led the team to victory in the 2005 FIFA World Youth Championship. He finished the tournament with six goals and two assists, and won the Golden Ball. (Note: Attributed to multiple references:)

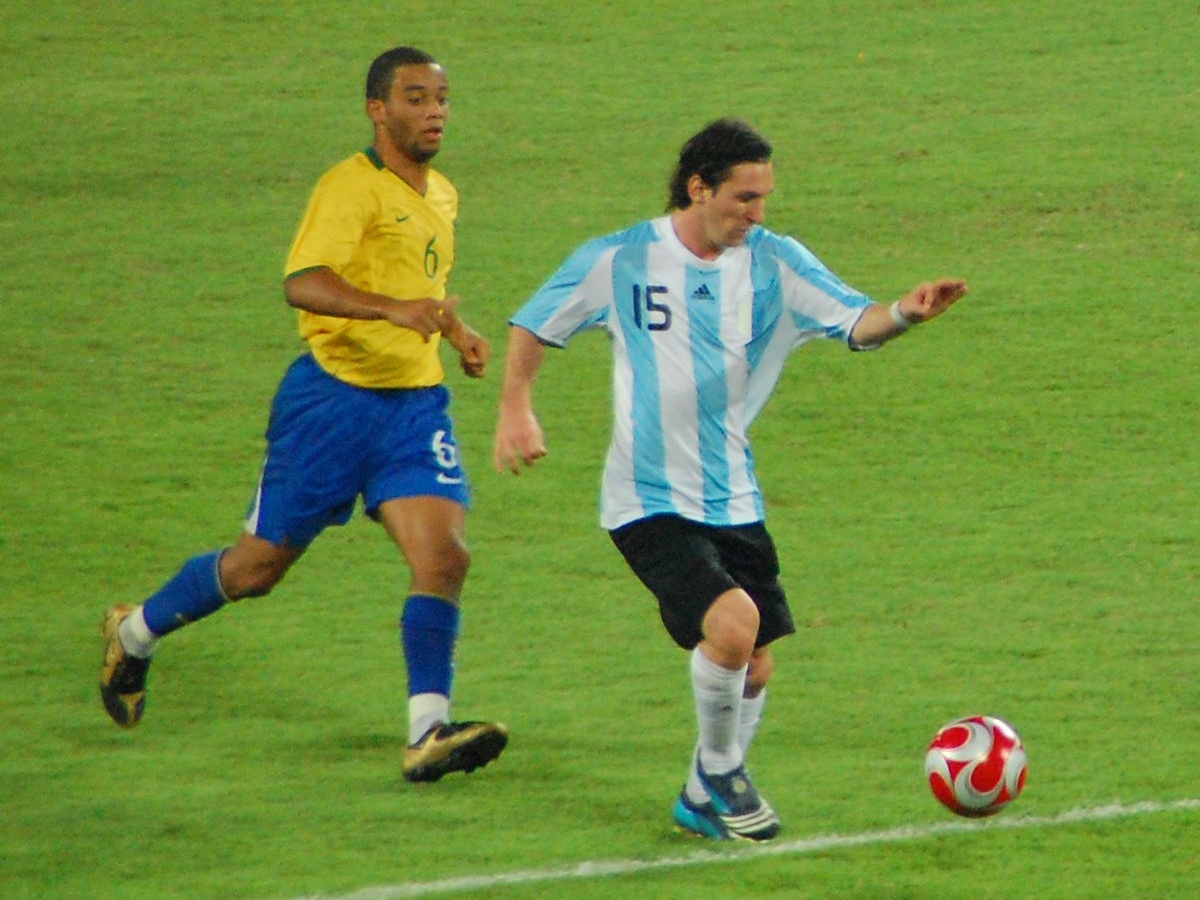
Messi evades Brazil's Marcelo in the semi-final of the 2008 Summer Olympics.

Messi made his debut with the senior national team in 2005, at age 18, and scored his first international goal in a 2006 friendly against Croatia. At the 2006 FIFA World Cup, he became the youngest player to represent and score for Argentina at the World Cup, where he scored in his debut match. Messi was named the best young player of the 2007 Copa América, during which he scored two goals and provided one assist. At the 2008 Summer Olympics, Messi led Argentina's U23 team to claim the Olympic gold medal over Nigeria; he was singled out by FIFA as the stand-out player from the tournament's best team.

With the international retirement of Juan Román Riquelme in 2009, Messi was given Argentina's number 10 shirt. Argentina built their team around Messi ahead of the 2010 FIFA World Cup and 2011 Copa América; Messi scored no goals during either tournament, as the team suffered quarter-final exits on both occasions. At 24 years old, Messi became captain of the national team, but over the next several years was unable to lead Argentina to a trophy. During the 2014 FIFA World Cup, Argentina lost to Germany in the final, though Messi was awarded the Golden Ball. The following year, Argentina lost to Chile in the 2015 Copa América final; Messi was reportedly selected to receive the Golden Ball, but he rejected the honour. During a semi-final match against the United States during the 2016 Copa América Centenario, Messi became Argentina's all-time leading goalscorer in international matches. Argentina won the semi-final but lost again to Chile in the final.

Losing three finals in three consecutive years caused Messi to retire from international football, but a nationwide campaign in Argentina helped convince him to return to the national team to lead them to the 2018 FIFA World Cup. Argentina were in jeopardy of missing the tournament on the last game of the qualifiers against Ecuador, but a hat-trick from Messi secured their entry. They went on to lose to France in the round of 16 during the World Cup, with Messi scoring one goal and making two assists in the tournament. The next year, Messi contributed one goal and one assist at the 2019 Copa América. Argentina finished the tournament in third place after defeating Chile, a victory which marked the start of a 36-game winning streak for the team that lasted for more than three years.

Messi led his team to the end of a 28-year trophy drought in the 2021 Copa América, during which he surpassed Javier Mascherano for most international appearances for Argentina. Messi's team defeated Brazil in the final, and he was named the player of the tournament, having either scored or assisted nine of Argentina's 12 goals. He led Argentina to another victory over Italy at the 2022 Finalissima, where he was named player of the match, providing two assists in the 3–0 win. At the 2022 FIFA World Cup, Messi led Argentina to their first World Cup victory in 36 years, scoring twice in the final to defeat France. Having scored seven goals and assisted three during the tournament, Messi again won the World Cup's Golden Ball, becoming the first player to win it twice.

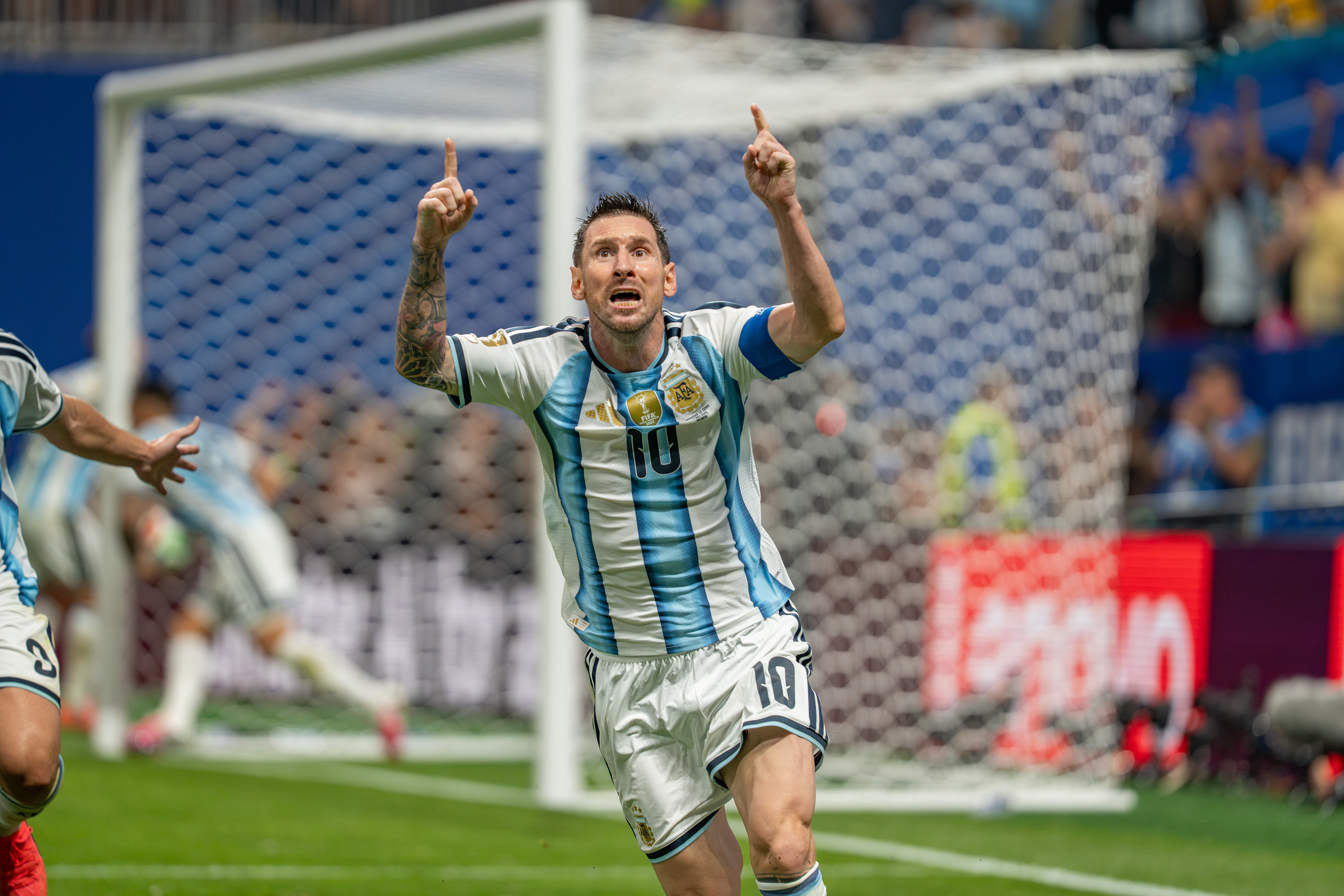
Messi celebrating after scoring against Egypt in the 2026 FIFA World Cup round of 16

In 2023, Messi became the third male player to reach 100 international goals. Later that year, he became the all-time top goalscorer in CONMEBOL World Cup qualifiers. In 2024, Argentina won the Copa América for a second consecutive time, with Messi setting a new record for most appearances at Copa América tournaments, with 39. Later that year, he became the all-time top assist-provider in men's international football. At the 2026 FIFA World Cup, he registered eight goals and four assists, overtaking Miroslav Klose and Marta to become the all-time leading World Cup goalscorer of any gender, before his record was surpassed by Kylian Mbappé later in the tournament. (Note: Attributed to multiple references:) He also set a new record for the most assists in World Cup history (12) since records began in 1966. Messi led Argentina to a second consecutive World Cup final, where they lost 1–0 to Spain in extra time. He was awarded the Silver Boot as the second-highest goalscorer of the tournament, and won the Silver Ball as the second-best player.

On 31 August 2026, Messi announced his retirement from international football. However, he was called up to the national team again to play one final match, a friendly against Benin at Estadio Monumental in Buenos Aires on 6 October. Argentina won the match 3–0, with Messi assisting the first two goals and scoring the final goal from a penalty kick. He finished his international career as Argentina's leading scorer and most-capped player with 126 goals and 208 appearances.

== Player profile ==
=== Style of play ===
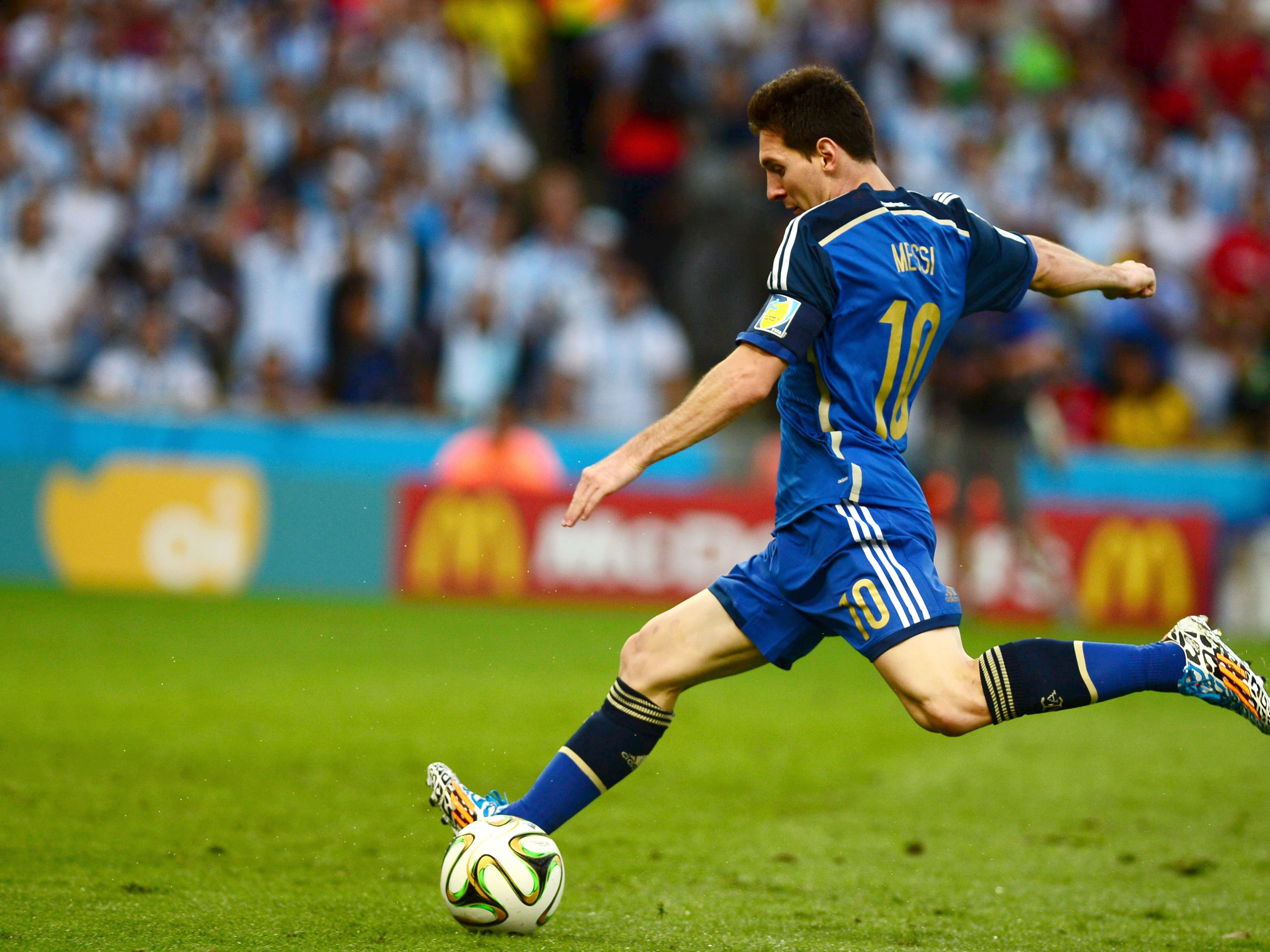
Messi prepares to shoot with his dominant left foot in the 2014 FIFA World Cup final.

Due to his short stature, Messi has a lower centre of gravity than taller players, which gives him greater agility and allows him to change direction more quickly and evade opposing tackles; the Spanish media has dubbed him La Pulga Atómica ("The Atomic Flea"). (Note: Attributed to multiple references:) Despite being physically unimposing, Messi possesses significant upper-body strength, which, when combined with his low centre of gravity and resulting balance, aids him in withstanding physical challenges from opponents; he has consequently been noted for his lack of diving in a sport rife with playacting. (Note: Attributed to multiple references:) Messi's short, strong legs allow him short bursts of acceleration, while his quick feet enable him to retain control of the ball when dribbling at speed. His former Barcelona manager Pep Guardiola once stated, "Messi is the only player that runs faster with the ball than he does without it." Messi is predominantly a left-footed player, although he has improved his ability with his weaker right foot since his mid-20s. He usually begins dribbling runs with the outside of his left foot, while using the inside of that foot to score and provide passes and assists.

A prolific goalscorer, Messi is known for his positioning, quick reactions, and ability to make attacking runs to beat the defensive line. He also functions in a playmaking role, courtesy of his vision and range of passing. He has often been described as a magician, conjuring goals and opportunities where none seemingly exist. (Note: Attributed to multiple references:) He is known for the accuracy of his free kicks, and as of September 2026 he ranks second in career goals scored from direct free kicks with 76. (Note: Attributed to multiple references:) He also has a penchant for scoring from chips.

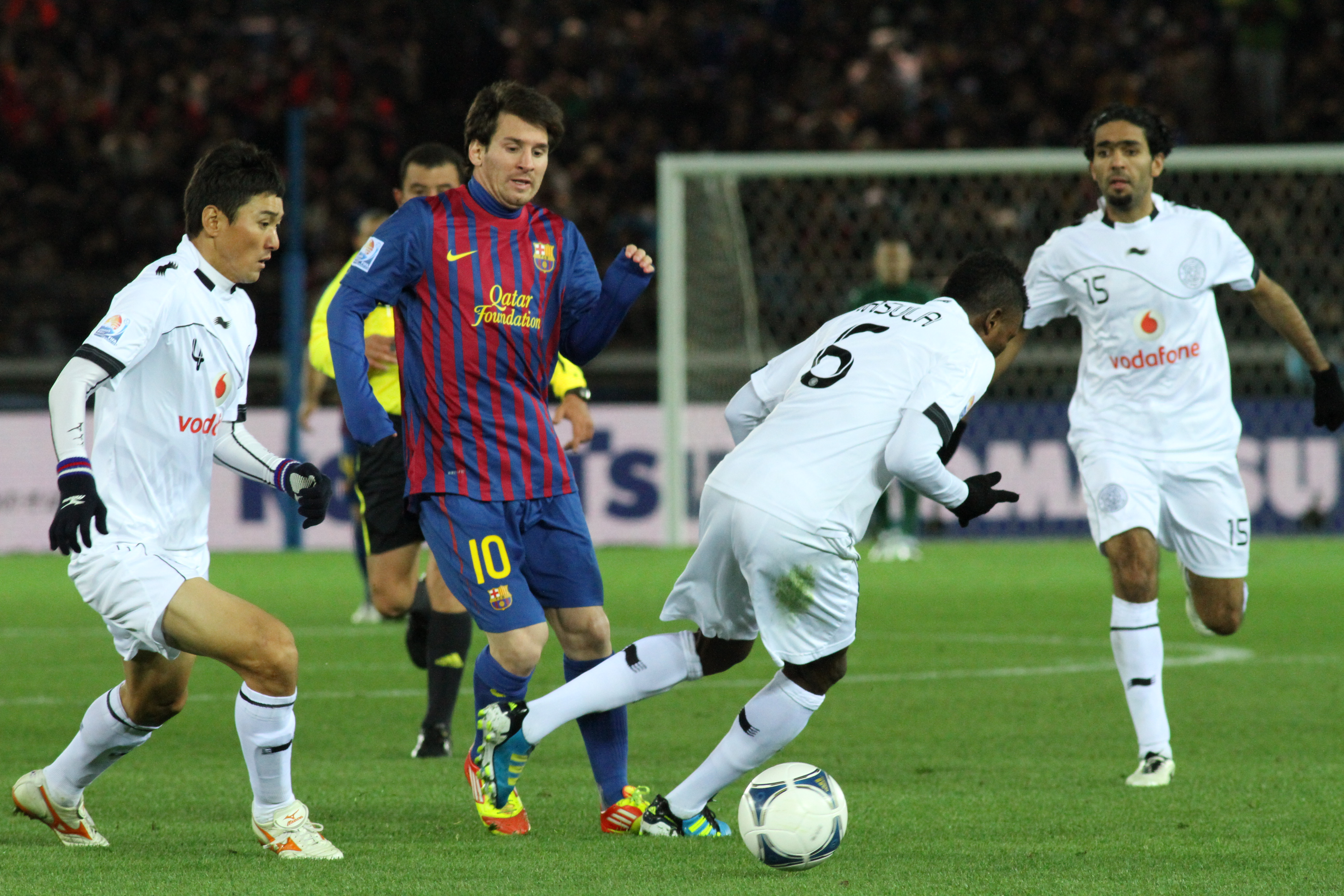
Messi's dribbling abilities have allowed him to weave past several defenders and orchestrate attacking plays.

Messi's pace and technical ability enable him to undertake individual dribbling runs towards the goal, in particular during counterattacks, usually starting from the halfway line or the right side of the pitch. (Note: Attributed to multiple references:) He is widely considered to be one of the greatest dribblers of all time. Former Argentina manager Diego Maradona said of him, "The ball stays glued to his foot ... I've never seen anyone with Messi's ball control." Beyond Messi's individual qualities, he is also a well-rounded, hard-working team player, known for his creative combinations, in particular with former Barcelona midfielders Xavi and Andrés Iniesta.

As his career advanced and his athleticism and tendency to dribble diminished with age, Messi began to dictate play in deeper areas of the pitch and developed into one of the best passers and playmakers in football history. (Note: Attributed to multiple references:) His work-rate off the ball and defensive responsibilities have decreased as his career has progressed; by covering less ground on the pitch, and instead conserving his energy for short bursts of speed, he has been able to improve his efficiency, movement, and positional play, and has been able to avoid muscular injuries. While he was injury-prone in his early career, he was able to decrease his injury count by running less off the ball, and by adopting a stricter diet, training regime, and sleep schedule.

=== Tactical positioning ===
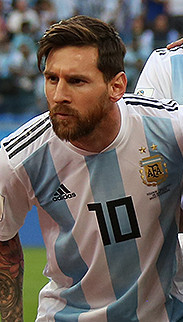
A versatile forward, Messi often plays as a classic number 10.

Tactically, Messi plays in a free attacking role; a versatile player, he is capable of attacking on either wing or through the centre of the pitch. His favoured position in childhood was the playmaker behind two strikers, known as the enganche in Argentine football, but he began his career in Spain as a left-winger or left-sided forward. Upon his first-team debut, he was moved onto the right wing by manager Frank Rijkaard; from this position, he could more easily cut through the defence into the middle of the pitch and curl shots on goal with his left foot, rather than predominantly cross balls for teammates. Under Guardiola and subsequent managers, he most often played in a false nine role; positioned as a centre-forward or lone striker, he roamed the centre, often moving deep into midfield and drawing defenders with him, in order to create and exploit spaces for passes, other teammates' attacking runs off the ball, his own dribbling runs, or combinations with Xavi and Iniesta.

Under the stewardship of Barcelona manager Luis Enrique, Messi returned to playing in the right-sided position that characterised much of his early career. He played in the manager's 4–3–3 formation, and was increasingly deployed in a deeper, free playmaking role in later seasons. Under Ernesto Valverde, Messi played in a variety of roles. While he was still occasionally deployed in a deeper role—from which he could make runs into the box, on the right wing or as a false nine—he was also used in a more offensive, central role in a 4–2–3–1. He was also used as a second striker in a 4–4–2 formation, where he was once again given the licence to drop deep, link up with midfielders, orchestrate his team's attacking plays, and create chances for his attacking partner Luis Suárez. With the Argentina national team, Messi has similarly played anywhere along the frontline. Under various managers, he has been employed on the right wing, as a false nine, as an out-and-out striker, in a supporting role alongside another forward, or in a deeper, free creative role as a classic number 10 playmaker or attacking midfielder behind the strikers.

=== Reception ===
Messi is widely regarded as one of the two best players of his generation, alongside Portuguese forward Cristiano Ronaldo. He is also considered one of the greatest footballers in the history of the sport. In 2025, he was named the All Time Men's World Best Player by the IFFHS.

A prodigious talent as a teenager, Messi established himself among the world's best players before age 20. After winning the 2005 Ballon d'Or, Messi's teammate Ronaldinho remarked, "I'm not even the best at Barça" in reference to the 18-year-old Messi. Four years later, after Messi won his first Ballon d'Or by a record margin, the public debate regarding his qualities as a player moved beyond his status in contemporary football to the possibility that he was one of the greatest players in history. (Note: Attributed to multiple references:) An early proponent was his then-Barcelona manager Pep Guardiola, who, as early as August 2009, described Messi as the best player he had ever seen and would ever see. In the following years, this opinion gained greater acceptance among pundits, managers, former and current players. By the end of Barcelona's second treble-winning season, the perception of Messi as one of the greatest footballers of all time had become the apparent view among many fans and pundits in continental Europe.

Many of Messi's teammates at Barcelona and Argentina have publicly marveled over his talent, including Thierry Henry, Zlatan Ibrahimović, Neymar, Luis Suárez, Xavi, Ángel Di María and Javier Mascherano. (Note: Attributed to multiple references:) Superstar peers Thomas Müller, Eden Hazard, Wayne Rooney, David Beckham and Didier Drogba have lauded Messi as the greatest player of all time, or the best of his generation. (Note: Attributed to multiple references:) Longtime Real Madrid rivals Luka Modrić and Sergio Ramos have both proclaimed Messi the best player in history. Messi was a childhood idol for Jamal Musiala, Lamine Yamal, Cole Palmer, Estêvão Willian, Julián Alvarez and Enzo Fernández. (Note: Attributed to multiple references:)

Messi received dismissals by critics throughout his career because he had not won an international tournament at the senior level with Argentina. (Note: Attributed to multiple references:) However, his subsequent victories in the 2021 Copa América and the 2022 FIFA World Cup resulted in him finally winning every top tier trophy at both the club and country levels, an achievement that many pundits felt cemented Messi's legacy.

=== Rivalry with Cristiano Ronaldo ===
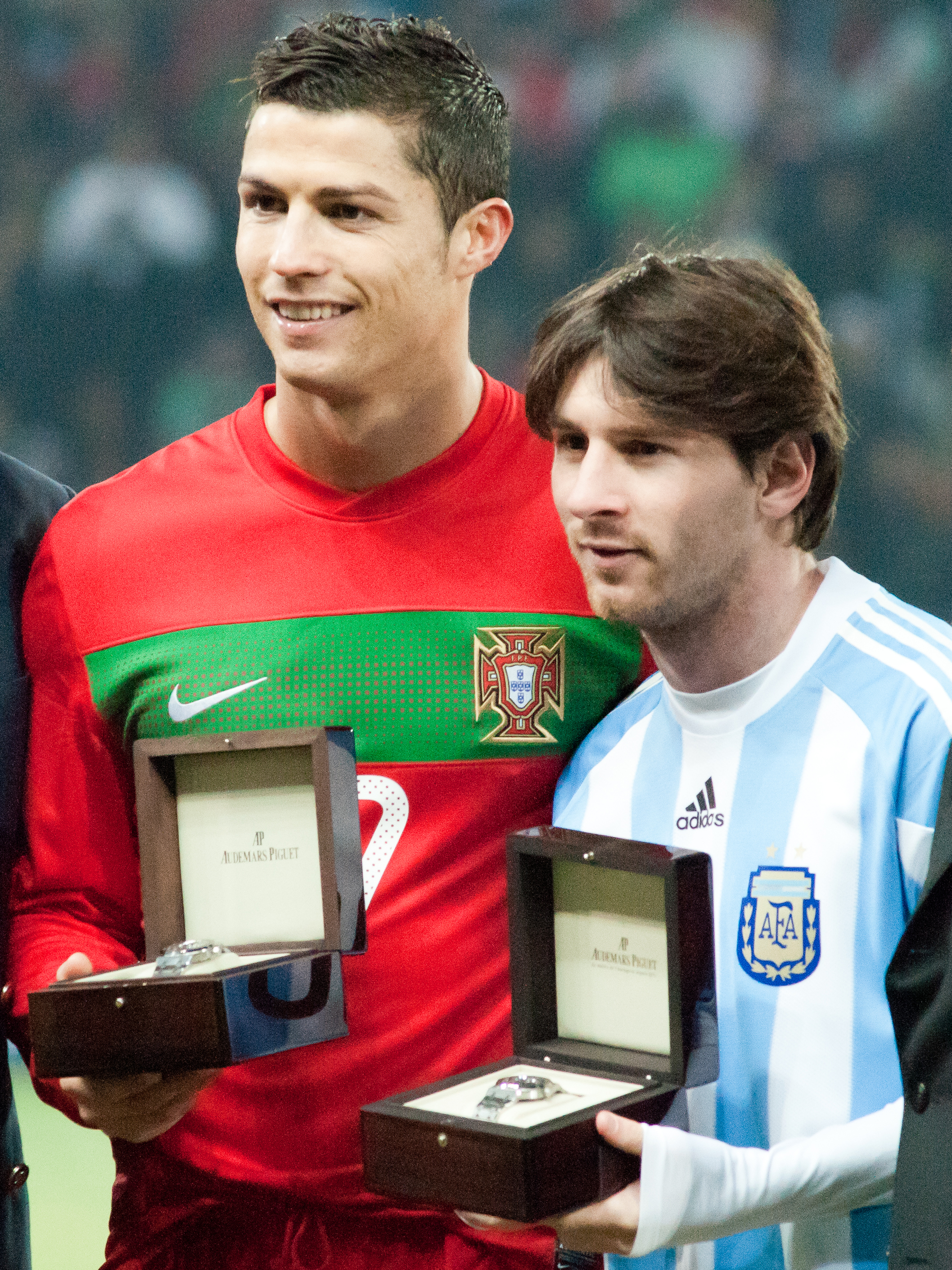
Messi has been compared with Cristiano Ronaldo (left) throughout much of their careers.

Among his contemporary peers, Messi is most often compared and contrasted with Cristiano Ronaldo, who many consider his career rival. Both achieved numerous individual accolades, won dozens of trophies for both club and country, and are the two leading goal scorers in history. Although Messi has at times denied any rivalry, they are widely believed to push one another in their aim to be the best player in the world. Pundits have compared the ongoing rivalry to past sports rivalries like the Muhammad Ali–Joe Frazier rivalry in boxing, the Prost–Senna rivalry in motorsport, and the tennis rivalries between Federer–Nadal and Borg–McEnroe.

Fans and pundits alike regularly argue the individual merits of both players. Messi is lauded for his combination of dribbling, playmaking, passing and goalscoring, while Ronaldo has received praise for his exceptional speed and athleticism, goalscoring skills, and performance under pressure. Beyond their playing styles, the debate also revolves around their differing physiques – Ronaldo is 1.87 m (6 ft 1 1/2 in) with a muscular build, while Messi is much shorter at 1.70 m (5 ft 7 in) – and their contrasting public personalities, with Ronaldo's self-confidence and theatrics differing from Messi's humility. Regarding individual achievements, Messi has won eight Ballons d'Or to Ronaldo's five, eight FIFA World's Best Player awards to Ronaldo's five, and six European Golden Shoes to Ronaldo's four. Off the pitch, Ronaldo is his direct competitor in terms of salary, sponsorships, and social media fanbase.

Messi's head-to-head record against teams that feature Ronaldo consists of 15 wins, 9 draws, and 10 losses in competitive club matches. The first competitive matchup between the two occurred in 2008, when Ronaldo's Manchester United played Messi's Barcelona in the 2007–08 UEFA Champions League semi-finals; Manchester United advanced and eventually won the final. The two players and their club teams met again in the next year's Champions League final, with Messi and Barcelona achieving a 2–0 victory. After this, Ronaldo transferred to Real Madrid, the main rivals of Barcelona, which resulted in Messi facing Ronaldo many times in El Clásico, which ranks among the world's most viewed annual sports events. A number of football critics, commentators, and players have said that Messi's triumph with Argentina in the 2022 World Cup has settled the contest between the two players. (Note: Attributed to multiple references:)

=== Comparisons with Diego Maradona ===
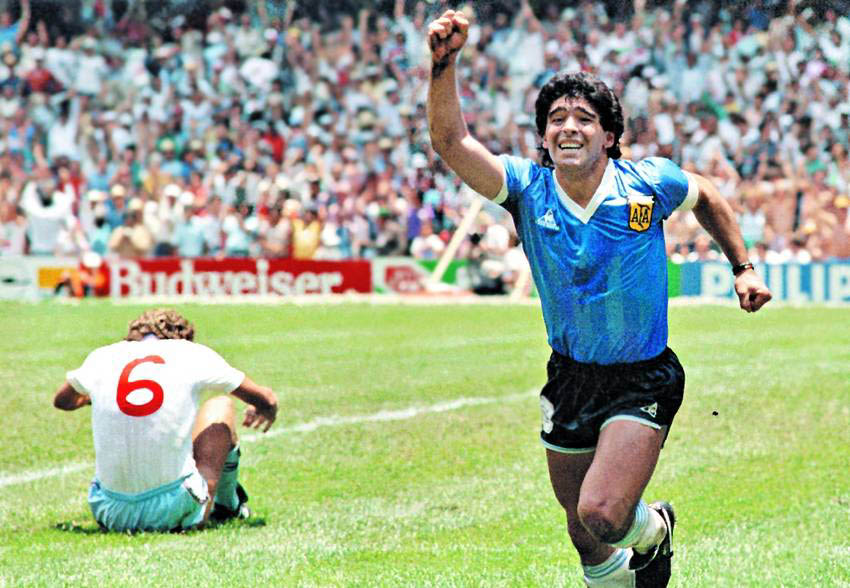
Due to their similar stature and style of play, Messi has frequently been compared to his compatriot Diego Maradona.

Throughout his career, Messi has been compared with Diego Maradona, who was also considered the best player of his generation and one of the greatest in the history of the sport. The comparisons stem broadly from both players' short statures, their similar playing styles as left-footed playmakers, and their shared nationality as Argentines. Initially, Messi was merely one of many young Argentine players to receive the "New Maradona" moniker, but as his career progressed, he proved his similarity beyond all previous contenders, establishing himself as the best player Argentina had produced since Maradona. When Messi was 18 years old, Maradona called him the best player in the world and hailed him as his successor. From 2008 through the 2010 FIFA World Cup, Messi played for Argentina's national team with Maradona as his manager, and it was during this period that Messi was given the number 10 shirt that Maradona famously wore. Maradona gave Messi his blessing, telling him: "the No 10 is yours. There's nobody better than you to wear it."

During the early and middle parts of Messi's career, he was generally held in lesser esteem than Maradona in Argentine society. Part of this had to do with Messi's lack of international tournament success and perceived uneven output with the national team; Maradona had famously led Argentina to victory in the 1986 FIFA World Cup, which set an expectation for Messi to do the same. (Note: Attributed to multiple references:) Argentines also identified more with the fiery, extroverted and controversial Maradona who came from the slums, as opposed to the reserved, introverted and unassuming Messi who had a comparably unremarkable upbringing in Rosario. (Note: Attributed to multiple references:) Maradona, along with several pundits and footballing figures, questioned whether Messi's temperament made him a capable leader for the national team. (Note: Attributed to multiple references:) Furthermore, Messi's lack of outward passion for the Argentina shirt, his early tendency not to sing the national anthem, and his relative lack of emotional displays have led to a perception that he feels more Catalan than Argentine. However, despite having lived in Barcelona since age 13, Messi rejected the option of representing Spain internationally, saying: "Argentina is my country, my family, my way of expressing myself. I would change all my records to make the people in my country happy."

"I have seen the player who will inherit my place in Argentinian football and his name is Messi."

— Diego Maradona hailing the 18-year-old Messi as his successor in February 2006

Football journalist Tim Vickery said the perception of Messi among Argentines changed in 2019, when Messi made a conscious effort to become "more one of the group, more Argentine". Other pundits noted that Messi had grown more assertive as a leader during the 2019 Copa América by becoming more vocal with his teammates both on and off the pitch, finally singing the national anthem with the team before matches, and speaking with journalists at length after matches. Following Argentina's 2022 World Cup win, Vickery felt that Messi would now be held in the same esteem by his compatriots as Maradona. Journalist and former footballer Jorge Valdano said he saw a "Maradonian" edge to Messi's performances during the tournament, while his compatriot Osvaldo Ardiles said that Messi's provocative actions towards the Netherlands team during the quarter-final resembled Maradona's behavior, which further endeared Messi to his fellow Argentines. Messi himself later remarked that the World Cup victory "won over all the people of Argentina. Today 95% or 100% of Argentines love me and that's a beautiful feeling."

== Cultural impact and legacy ==
=== Popularity ===
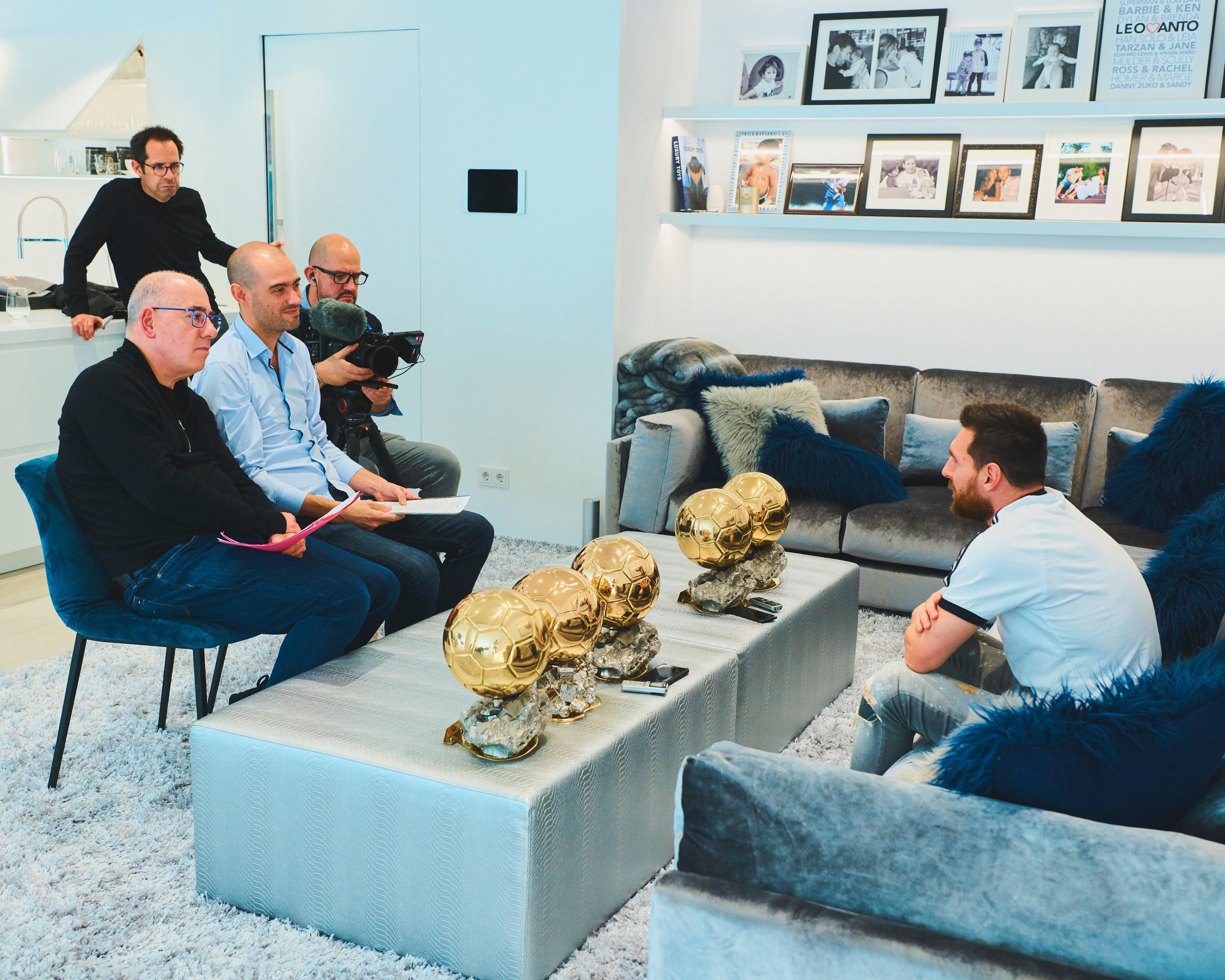
Messi (right) being interviewed in 2019 by France Football. Messi's success on the pitch has earned him widespread recognition and popularity.

Messi was among the Time 100, an annual list of the world's most influential people, in 2011, 2012 and 2023. (Note: Attributed to multiple references:) According to a 2014 survey in 15 international markets, Messi was familiar to 87% of respondents around the world, of whom 78% perceived him favourably, making him the second-most recognised player globally, behind Cristiano Ronaldo, and the most likeable of all contemporary players. World Press Photo selected "The Final Game", a photo of Messi facing the World Cup trophy after Argentina's final defeat to Germany, as the best sports image of 2014.

Messi's fanbase on Facebook is among the largest of public figures: by July 2023, he had more than 114 million followers, the second highest for an athlete after Cristiano Ronaldo. Messi has over 500 million Instagram followers, the second highest for an individual and athlete after Ronaldo. Messi's World Cup celebration post from 18 December 2022 is the most liked post on Instagram with more than 75 million likes. In April 2023, Messi was featured in the Thrissur Pooram festival in Kerala, India. In December 2023, a set of shirts Messi had worn during the 2022 World Cup was sold at auction for $7.8 million.

During an exhibition match on 4 February 2024 between Inter Miami and Hong Kong League players at Hong Kong Stadium, Messi remained on the bench the entire game. His absence from the pitch caused massive backlash in Hong Kong and China, as thousands of spectators had hoped to see him play. One Messi commercial was taken off the air in those regions, while other commercials continued to air despite pressure from Chinese social-media users. (Note: Attributed to multiple references:) The Chinese Football Association temporarily halted its partnership with the Argentine Football Association over the incident.

=== Wealth and sponsorships ===
In 2026, Bloomberg reported that Messi's net worth had surpassed $1 billion. Messi was the world's highest-paid footballer for five out of six years between 2009 and 2014. His salary broke records in 2013 (€41 million) and 2014 (€65 million). Forbes listed him as the world's second highest-paid athlete in 2016, and as the world's highest-paid athlete in 2019. (Note: Attributed to multiple references:) In 2018, he was the first player to exceed the €100 million benchmark for a calendar year, with earnings of €126 million in combined income from salaries, bonuses and endorsements. In 2020, Messi became the second footballer to surpass $1 billion in career earnings. In 2026, he appeared on The World's Billionaires list for the first time with a $1.1 billion net worth.

In addition to salary and bonuses, much of Messi's income comes from endorsements. His brand was at first based exclusively on his talents and achievements as a player, in contrast to arguably more glamorous players like Ronaldo and David Beckham. At the start of his career, Messi mainly held sponsorship contracts with companies that employed sports-oriented marketing, such as Adidas and Pepsi. Since 2006, Adidas has been his largest sponsor, and he eventually became the company's leading brand endorser. Starting in 2010, Messi's marketing appeal broadened as he reached higher achievements as a player. He signed long-term endorsement deals with luxury brands Dolce & Gabbana and Audemars Piguet, and became a brand ambassador for Gillette, Turkish Airlines, Ooredoo, and Tata Motors, among other companies. (Note: Attributed to multiple references:) Messi has also been the face of two video game series: Konami's Pro Evolution Soccer and EA Sports' FIFA.

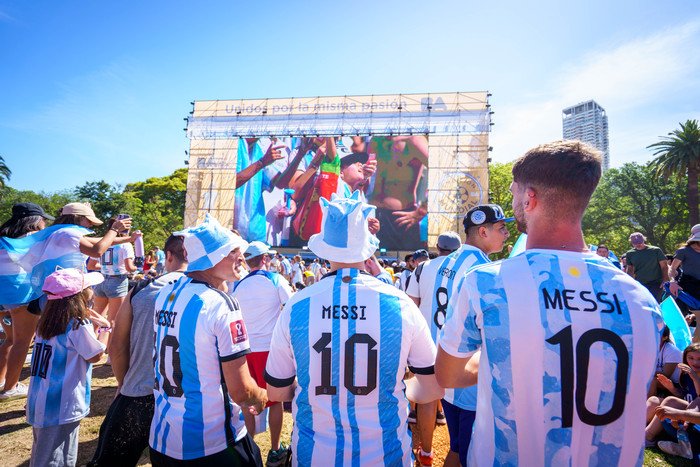
Messi's Argentina jersey, supplied by Adidas, was sold out worldwide during the 2022 World Cup.

SportsPro cited Messi as one of the world's most marketable athletes every year between 2010 and 2015. He became the first footballer to receive his own sub-brand of Adidas boots, the Adidas Messi, in 2015. The same year, a Barcelona jersey with Messi's name and number was the best-selling replica jersey worldwide. During the 2022 World Cup, Adidas sold out of Messi's No. 10 Argentina jersey worldwide.

In 2013, a Turkish Airlines advertisement starring Messi and Kobe Bryant became the most-watched advertisement on YouTube, with 137 million views. It was voted by users as the best advertisement of the decade 2005–2015. In June 2021, Messi signed a five-year deal to become a brand ambassador for Hard Rock Cafe, and the following year he became a tourism ambassador for Saudi Arabia. He was criticised for partnering with Saudi Arabia because of the country's poor record on human rights.

=== Public art ===
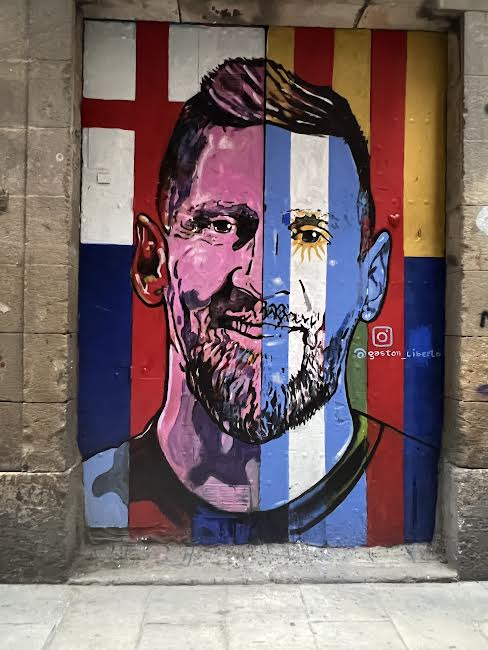
Street art depicting Messi in Barcelona

Street art and public murals depicting Messi have been painted around the world. One prominent work of art is the Sistine Chapel of Football, a parody of Michelangelo's The Creation of Adam that features Messi, Diego Maradona and several other Argentine footballers. The work is exhibited at the Sportivo Pereyra club in Barracas, Buenos Aires.

Madame Tussauds unveiled a wax sculpture of Messi at Wembley Stadium in 2012. Several days after Messi announced his retirement from Argentina's national team in June 2016, a bronze statue of him was erected in Buenos Aires in an attempt to convince him to return. Following Argentina's 2022 World Cup victory, a life-sized statue of Messi holding the World Cup trophy was unveiled outside the CONMEBOL headquarters in Luque, Paraguay in March 2023. The statue of Messi stands alongside statues of Pelé and Maradona. In December 2025, during Messi's tour of India, a 70-foot (21 m) statue of him holding the World Cup trophy was unveiled at the Sree Bhumi Sporting Club in Lake Town, Kolkata. The statue was later removed due to instability. In June 2026, an 85-foot (26 m) statue of Messi was erected in Cutral Có, Argentina.

=== Media ===
Messi, a documentary directed by Álex de la Iglesia, premiered at the 71st Venice International Film Festival in August 2014. Messi's World Cup: The Rise of a Legend, a biographical docuseries focusing on Messi's career, his highs and lows with the Argentina national football team, and their eventual success at the 2022 FIFA World Cup, aired on Apple TV+ on 21 February 2024.

=== Business ventures ===
On 4 June 2024, Messi announced the release of Más+, an American brand of sports drinks and energy drinks. Messi created the drinks because he could not find a flavourful and healthy hydration option that suited his needs. (Note: Attributed to multiple references:) On 19 September, Messi launched the production company 525 Rosario, which produces films, sporting events coverage and branded commercials for athletes worldwide. It is a joint venture with Smuggler Entertainment, which co-produced Messi's World Cup: The Rise of a Legend earlier in 2024. In 2025, Messi was invited by his Inter Miami teammate Luis Suárez to play a role in Deportivo LSM, the Uruguayan professional football club that Suárez founded. On 16 April 2026, Messi acquired full ownership of the Spanish football club UE Cornellà.

== Philanthropy ==
Throughout his career, Messi has been involved in charitable efforts aimed at children, a commitment that stems in part from the medical difficulties he faced in his own childhood. Since 2004, he has contributed his time and finances to the United Nations Children's Fund (UNICEF), an organisation that has also collaborated with FC Barcelona. Messi has served as a UNICEF Goodwill Ambassador since 2010; he completed his first field mission for the organisation that year as he travelled to Haiti to bring awareness to the plight of the country's children following the 2010 Haiti earthquake. He has since participated in UNICEF campaigns related to HIV prevention, education, and the social inclusion of disabled children. In November 2013, Messi and his one-year-old son Thiago were part of a publicity campaign to raise awareness of mortality rates among disadvantaged children.

In 2007, Messi launched the Leo Messi Foundation, which supports access to health care, education, and sport for children. It was established following Messi's visit to a hospital in Boston for terminally ill children, an experience that resonated with him to the point that he decided to reinvest part of his earnings into society. Through his foundation, Messi has awarded research grants, financed medical training, and invested in the development of medical centres and projects in Argentina, Spain, and elsewhere in the world. In addition to receiving funds from Messi's own fundraising activities, the foundation receives financial support from various companies which have endorsement agreements with Messi, with Adidas as the main sponsor. A gold replica of Messi's left foot, weighing 25 kg (55 lb) and valued at $5.3 million, went on sale in Japan in 2013 to raise funds for victims of the 2011 Tōhoku earthquake and tsunami.

Messi has invested in youth football in Argentina. He supports Sarmiento, a football club based in the Rosario neighbourhood where he was born, and in 2013 he committed to the refurbishment of the club's facilities and the installation of all-weather pitches. Messi also financially supports the management of several youth players at Newell's Old Boys (his boyhood club) and rival club Rosario Central, as well as at River Plate and Boca Juniors in Buenos Aires. In 2012, Messi funded the construction of a new gymnasium and a dormitory inside Newell's stadium for their youth academy. His youth coach at Newell's, Ernesto Vecchio, is employed by the Leo Messi Foundation as a talent scout for young players. On 7 June 2016, Messi won a libel case against La Razón newspaper and was awarded €65,000 in damages, which he donated to the charity Médecins Sans Frontières. During the COVID-19 pandemic, Messi and his FC Barcelona teammates announced they would take a 70% salary cut to offset the club's financial losses, and said they would make further contributions to ensure club employees received full salaries while unable to work. Messi also donated €1 million to fight the spread of COVID-19.

In November 2016, while the Argentine Football Association was being run by a FIFA committee due to an economic crisis, three of the national team's security staff told Messi that they had not received their salaries for six months. He paid the salaries of the three employees. In February 2021, Messi made a donation to the Museu Nacional d'Art de Catalunya: the Adidas shoes he wore when he scored his 644th goal for Barcelona and broke Pelé's record for most goals scored for a single club. The museum later auctioned off the shoes for £125,000 to support a charity focused on children with cancer.

Ahead of the 2021 Copa América, Messi donated three signed sweatshirts to the Chinese pharmaceutical firm Sinovac Biotech – whose directors spoke of their admiration for Messi – in order to secure 50,000 doses of Sinovac's COVID-19 vaccine, CoronaVac, in the hope of vaccinating all South American football players. The plan, which was brokered by Uruguay's president Luis Lacalle Pou, caused some controversy for its focus on football players, given widespread vaccine scarcity on the continent. In January 2025, Messi was awarded the Presidential Medal of Freedom, the highest civilian award of the United States, for his contributions to healthcare and education programs for children around the world.

On 4 August 2026, Messi donated €80,000 to support reconstruction efforts in the Sierra Oeste region of the Community of Madrid following the wildfires. Isabel Díaz Ayuso, President of the Community of Madrid, publicly thanked him for the donation.

== Personal life ==
=== Family and relationships ===
Since 2008, Messi has been in a relationship with Antonela Roccuzzo, whom he married on 30 June 2017 in their home city of Rosario. Roccuzzo is the cousin of Messi's childhood best friend, Lucas Scaglia, and Messi has known her since he was five years old. After keeping their relationship private for a year, Messi confirmed their romance in an interview in January 2009. Messi and Roccuzzo have three sons, born in 2012, 2015, and 2018. To celebrate Roccuzzo's first pregnancy, Messi placed the ball under his shirt after scoring in Argentina's 4–0 win against Ecuador on 2 June 2012, before confirming the pregnancy in an interview two weeks later. Messi and his family are Catholic.

Messi has a close relationship with his immediate family members, particularly his mother, Celia, whose face is tattooed on his left shoulder. His professional affairs are largely run as a family business. His father Jorge was his agent and manager from 2000 until 2026, when he died at the age of 68. His oldest brother, Rodrigo, handles his daily schedule and publicity. His mother and other brother, Matías, manage his charitable organisation, the Leo Messi Foundation, and take care of personal and professional matters in Rosario. His younger sister, María Sol, had a leadership role at Messi's fashion brand The Messi Store before joining his production company 525 Rosario.

Since leaving for Spain at age 13, Messi has maintained close ties to Rosario, and has preserved his Rosarino accent. He has retained ownership of his family's old house, although it has long stood empty, and he maintains a penthouse apartment in an exclusive residential building for his mother, as well as a family compound just outside the city. Messi keeps in frequent contact with a small group of confidants in Rosario, most of whom were fellow members of "The Machine of '87" at Newell's Old Boys. He was on bad terms with the club after his transfer to Barcelona, but by 2012 their public feud had ended, with Newell's embracing their ties with Messi and issuing a club membership card to his newborn son. (Note: Attributed to multiple references:) Messi has long planned to end his playing career at Newell's. Messi has citizenship in Argentina, Italy, and Spain.

=== Tax fraud ===
Messi came under investigation in 2013 for suspected tax evasion in Spain. Offshore companies in tax havens such as Uruguay, Switzerland and Belize were used to evade €4.1 million in taxes related to his sponsorship earnings between 2007 and 2009. Messi, who pleaded ignorance to the scheme, voluntarily paid arrears of €5.1 million in August 2013. On 6 July 2016, Messi and his father were both found guilty of tax fraud and were given suspended 21-month prison sentences and ordered to pay €1.7 million and €1.4 million in fines, respectively. In court, Messi told the judge, "I just played football. I signed the contracts because I trusted my dad and the lawyers and we had decided that they would take charge of those things." An unrelated shell company in Panama set up in 2012 was subsequently identified as belonging to the Messis in the Panama Papers data leak.

== Career statistics ==
=== Club ===
As of match played 21 November 2026

Appearances and goals by club, season and competition
Club	Season	League			National cup (Note: Includes Copa del Rey, Coupe de France, U.S. Open Cup)		Continental (Note: All appearances in UEFA Champions League, unless otherwise noted)		Other		Total	
Club	Season	Division	Apps	Goals	Apps	Goals	Apps	Goals	Apps	Goals	Apps	Goals
Barcelona C	2003–04	Tercera División	10	5	—		—		—		10	5
Barcelona B	2003–04	Segunda División B	5	0	—		—		—		5	0
Barcelona B	2004–05	Segunda División B	17	6	—		—		—		17	6
Barcelona B	Total		22	6	0	0	0	0	0	0	22	6
Barcelona	2004–05	La Liga	7	1	1	0	1	0	—		9	1
Barcelona	2005–06	La Liga	17	6	2	1	6	1	0	0	25	8
Barcelona	2006–07	La Liga	26	14	2	2	5	1	3 (Note: One appearance in UEFA Super Cup, two appearances in Supercopa de España)	0	36	17
Barcelona	2007–08	La Liga	28	10	3	0	9	6	—		40	16
Barcelona	2008–09	La Liga	31	23	8	6	12	9	—		51	38
Barcelona	2009–10	La Liga	35	34	3	1	11	8	4 (Note: One appearance in UEFA Super Cup, one appearance and two goals in Supercopa de España, two appearances and two goals in FIFA Club World Cup)	4	53	47
Barcelona	2010–11	La Liga	33	31	7	7	13	12	2 (Note: Appearance(s) in Supercopa de España)	3	55	53
Barcelona	2011–12	La Liga	37	50	7	3	11	14	5 (Note: One appearance and one goal in UEFA Super Cup, two appearances and three goals in Supercopa de España, two appearances and two goals in FIFA Club World Cup)	6	60	73
Barcelona	2012–13	La Liga	32	46	5	4	11	8	2	2	50	60
Barcelona	2013–14	La Liga	31	28	6	5	7	8	2	0	46	41
Barcelona	2014–15	La Liga	38	43	6	5	13	10	—		57	58
Barcelona	2015–16	La Liga	33	26	5	5	7	6	4 (Note: One appearance and two goals in UEFA Super Cup, two appearances and one goal in Supercopa de España, one appearance and one goal in FIFA Club World Cup)	4	49	41
Barcelona	2016–17	La Liga	34	37	7	5	9	11	2	1	52	54
Barcelona	2017–18	La Liga	36	34	6	4	10	6	2	1	54	45
Barcelona	2018–19	La Liga	34	36	5	3	10	12	1	0	50	51
Barcelona	2019–20	La Liga	33	25	2	2	8	3	1	1	44	31
Barcelona	2020–21	La Liga	35	30	5	3	6	5	1	0	47	38
Barcelona	Total		520	474	80	56	149	120	29	22	778	672
Paris Saint-Germain	2021–22	Ligue 1	26	6	1	0	7	5	—		34	11
Paris Saint-Germain	2022–23	Ligue 1	32	16	1	0	7	4	1 (Note: Appearance in Trophée des Champions)	1	41	21
Paris Saint-Germain	Total		58	22	2	0	14	9	1	1	75	32
Inter Miami	2023	MLS	6	1	1	0	—		7 (Note: Appearances in Leagues Cup)	10	14	11
Inter Miami	2024	MLS	19	20	—		3 (Note: Appearances in CONCACAF Champions Cup)	2	3 (Note: Appearances in MLS Cup playoffs)	1	25	23
Inter Miami	2025	MLS	28	29	—		7	5	14 (Note: Four appearances and one goal in FIFA Club World Cup, four appearances and two goals in Leagues Cup, six appearances and six goals in MLS Cup playoffs)	9	49	43
Inter Miami	2026	MLS	31	26	—		2	1	4 (Note: Two appearances and two goals in Leagues Cup, one appearance and one goal in Campeones Cup, one appearance in MLS Cup playoffs)	3	37	30
Inter Miami	Total		84	76	1	0	12	8	27	22	125	107
Career total			694	583	83	56	175	137	57	45	1,010	822

=== International ===
Appearances and goals by national team, year and competition
Team	Year	Competitive		Friendly		Total	
Team	Year	Apps	Goals	Apps	Goals	Apps	Goals
Argentina U20	2004	—		2	3	2	3
Argentina U20	2005	16 (Note: Nine appearances and five goals in the 2005 South American U-20 Championship, seven appearances and six goals in the 2005 FIFA World Youth Championship.)	11	—		16	11
Argentina U20	Total	16	11	2	3	18	14
Argentina U23	2008	5 (Note: Appearances in the 2008 Summer Olympics.)	2	—		5	2
Argentina U23	Total	5	2	0	0	5	2
Argentina	2005	3 (Note: Appearances in 2006 FIFA World Cup qualification.)	0	2	0	5	0
Argentina	2006	3 (Note: Appearances in 2006 FIFA World Cup.)	1	4	1	7	2
Argentina	2007	10 (Note: Six appearances and two goals in 2007 Copa América, four appearances and two goals in 2010 FIFA World Cup qualification.)	4	4	2	14	6
Argentina	2008	6 (Note: Appearances in 2010 FIFA World Cup qualification.)	1	2	1	8	2
Argentina	2009	8	1	2	2	10	3
Argentina	2010	5 (Note: Appearances in 2010 FIFA World Cup.)	0	5	2	10	2
Argentina	2011	8 (Note: Four appearances in 2011 Copa América, four appearances and two goals in 2014 FIFA World Cup qualification.)	2	5	2	13	4
Argentina	2012	5 (Note: Appearances in 2014 FIFA World Cup qualification.)	5	4	7	9	12
Argentina	2013	5	3	2	3	7	6
Argentina	2014	7 (Note: Appearances in 2014 FIFA World Cup.)	4	7	4	14	8
Argentina	2015	6 (Note: Appearances in 2015 Copa América.)	1	2	3	8	4
Argentina	2016	10 (Note: Five appearances and three goals in 2018 FIFA World Cup qualification, five appearances and five goals in Copa América Centenario.)	8	1	0	11	8
Argentina	2017	5 (Note: Appearances in 2018 FIFA World Cup qualification.)	4	2	0	7	4
Argentina	2018	4 (Note: Appearances in 2018 FIFA World Cup.)	1	1	3	5	4
Argentina	2019	6 (Note: Appearances in 2019 Copa América.)	1	4	4	10	5
Argentina	2020	4 (Note: Appearances in 2022 FIFA World Cup qualification.)	1	—		4	1
Argentina	2021	16 (Note: Nine appearances and five goals in 2022 FIFA World Cup qualification, seven appearances and four goals in 2021 Copa América.)	9	—		16	9
Argentina	2022	10 (Note: Two appearances and one goal in 2022 FIFA World Cup qualification, one appearance in 2022 Finalissima, seven appearances and seven goals in 2022 FIFA World Cup.)	8	4	10	14	18
Argentina	2023	5 (Note: Appearances in 2026 FIFA World Cup qualification.)	3	3	5	8	8
Argentina	2024	9 (Note: Five appearances and one goal in 2024 Copa América, four appearances and three goals in 2026 FIFA World Cup qualification.)	4	2	2	11	6
Argentina	2025	3	2	2	1	5	3
Argentina	2026	8 (Note: Appearances in 2026 FIFA World Cup.)	8	4	3	12	11
Argentina	Total	146	71	62	55	208	126
Career total		167	84	64	58	231	142

== Honours ==
Barcelona (Note: Attributed to multiple references:)

- La Liga: 2004–05, 2005–06, 2008–09, 2009–10, 2010–11, 2012–13, 2014–15, 2015–16, 2017–18, 2018–19
- Copa del Rey: 2008–09, 2011–12, 2014–15, 2015–16, 2016–17, 2017–18, 2020–21
- Supercopa de España: (Note: According to FC Barcelona, FIFA, the Royal Spanish Football Federation, and multiple media outlets, Messi also won the 2005 Supercopa de España. However, this particular trophy is not credited here since Messi was out of the squad and did not feature in either of the two matches against Real Betis.) 2006, 2009, 2010, 2011, 2013, 2016, 2018
- UEFA Champions League: 2005–06, 2008–09, 2010–11, 2014–15
- UEFA Super Cup: 2009, 2011, 2015
- FIFA Club World Cup: 2009, 2011, 2015

Paris Saint-Germain

- Ligue 1: 2021–22, 2022–23
- Trophée des Champions: 2022

Inter Miami (Note: Messi and Inter Miami were also awarded a trophy for winning the Eastern Conference title during the 2025 MLS Cup playoffs. However, this trophy is not officially recognized by FIFA, so it is not credited here.)

- MLS Cup: 2025
- Supporters' Shield: 2024
- Leagues Cup: 2023
- Campeones Cup: 2026

Argentina U20

- FIFA World Youth Championship: 2005

Argentina U23

- Olympic Games: 2008

Argentina

- FIFA World Cup: 2022
- Copa América: 2021, 2024
- Finalissima: 2022

Individual

- Ballon d'Or: 2009, 2010, 2011, 2012, 2015, 2019, 2021, 2023
- FIFA World Player of the Year/FIFA Ballon d'Or/The Best FIFA Men's Player: 2009, 2010, 2011, 2012, 2015, 2019, 2022, 2023
- FIFA World Cup Golden Ball: 2014, 2022
- FIFA World Cup Silver Ball: 2026
- FIFA World Cup Silver Boot: 2022, 2026
- FIFA Club World Cup Golden Ball: 2009, 2011
- FIFA World Youth Championship Golden Ball: 2005
- FIFA World Youth Championship Golden Boot: 2005
- UEFA Club Footballer of the Year: 2008–09
- UEFA Men's Player of the Year Award: 2010–11, 2014–15
- UEFA Champions League top scorer: 2008–09, 2009–10, 2010–11, 2011–12, 2014–15, 2018–19
- European Golden Shoe: 2009–10, 2011–12, 2012–13, 2016–17, 2017–18, 2018–19
- Copa América Golden Ball: 2015, 2021
- Copa América Golden Boot: 2021
- La Liga Best Player: 2008–09, 2009–10, 2010–11, 2011–12, 2012–13, 2014–15, (Note: Attributed to multiple references:) 2016–17, 2017–18, 2018–19
- MLS Most Valuable Player: 2024, 2025
- Pichichi Trophy: 2009−10, 2011–12, 2012−13, 2016–17, 2017−18, 2018–19, 2019–20, 2020–21
- MLS Golden Boot: 2025, 2026
- Laureus World Sportsman of the Year: 2020, 2023
- IFFHS World's Best Player: 2022
- TIME Athlete of the Year: 2023
- Ballon d'Or Dream Team: 2020
- FIFPRO World 11: 2007, 2008, 2009, 2010, 2011, 2012, 2013, 2014, 2015, 2016, 2017, 2018, 2019, 2020, 2021, 2022, 2023, 2026
- Argentine Sportsperson of the Year: 2011, 2021, 2022, 2023
- Argentine Footballer of the Year: 2005, 2007, 2008, 2009, 2010, 2011, 2012, 2013, 2015, 2016, 2017, 2019, 2020, 2021, 2022, 2023 (Note: Attributed to multiple references:)

Decorations and honorific titles

- UNICEF Goodwill Ambassador: 2010
- Creu de Sant Jordi: 2019
- Presidential Medal of Freedom: 2025
- Princess of Asturias Award for Sports: 2026
- Honorary Doctorate, University of Buenos Aires: 2026

== See also ==
- List of players who have appeared in the most FIFA World Cups
- List of top international men's football goalscorers by country
- List of men's footballers with 100 or more international caps
- List of men's footballers with 50 or more international goals
- List of men's footballers with the most official appearances
- List of men's footballers with 500 or more goals
- List of Argentina international footballers
- List of FIFA World Cup winning players
- List of FIFA World Cup top goalscorers
- List of largest sports contracts

== Notes ==
Sporting positions
Preceded by Andrés Iniesta	FC Barcelona captain 2018–2021	Succeeded by Sergio Busquets
