= MSN (association football) =

Trio of players in FC Barcelona

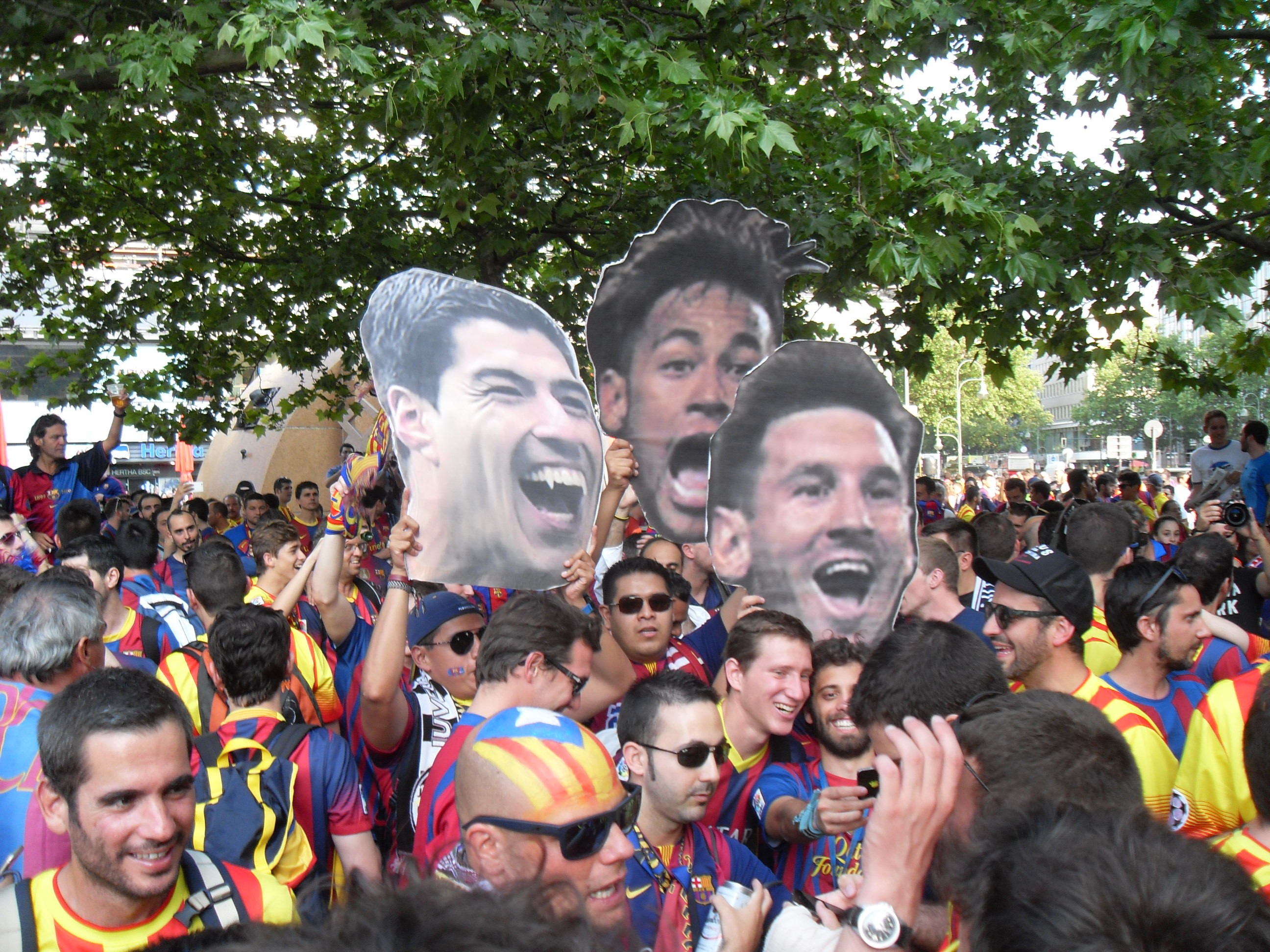
Barcelona fans holding placards of the MSN trio ahead of the 2015 UEFA Champions League final in Berlin, Germany. In order: Suarez, Neymar, Messi.

MSN (an acronym for Messi, Suárez and Neymar) was the attacking trio of association football players Lionel Messi, Luis Suárez, and Neymar, who played together for the Spanish club FC Barcelona for three seasons during 2014–2017 following Suárez's arrival from Liverpool F.C. in the summer of 2014. During their three seasons together, they scored 364 goals and provided 174 assists while helping Barcelona win nine trophies, including the continental treble in 2014–15.

With Messi in the right wing position, Suárez in the middle, and Neymar in the left wing position, the trio were able to create a "symbiotic" relationship in which Suárez was a relentless runner, Messi was at the centre of orchestration and team play, and Neymar was an explosive and creative threat. In 2015, French sports newspaper L'Équipe ranked Messi, Neymar and Suárez as the three best players in the world in a ranking of 100 players, placing them first, second and third, respectively.

The success and popularity of MSN also popularised the use of acronyms to describe other attacking trios in Europe. They were frequently compared with their rivals Spanish club Real Madrid's "BBC" (Gareth Bale, Karim Benzema and Cristiano Ronaldo).

== Background ==
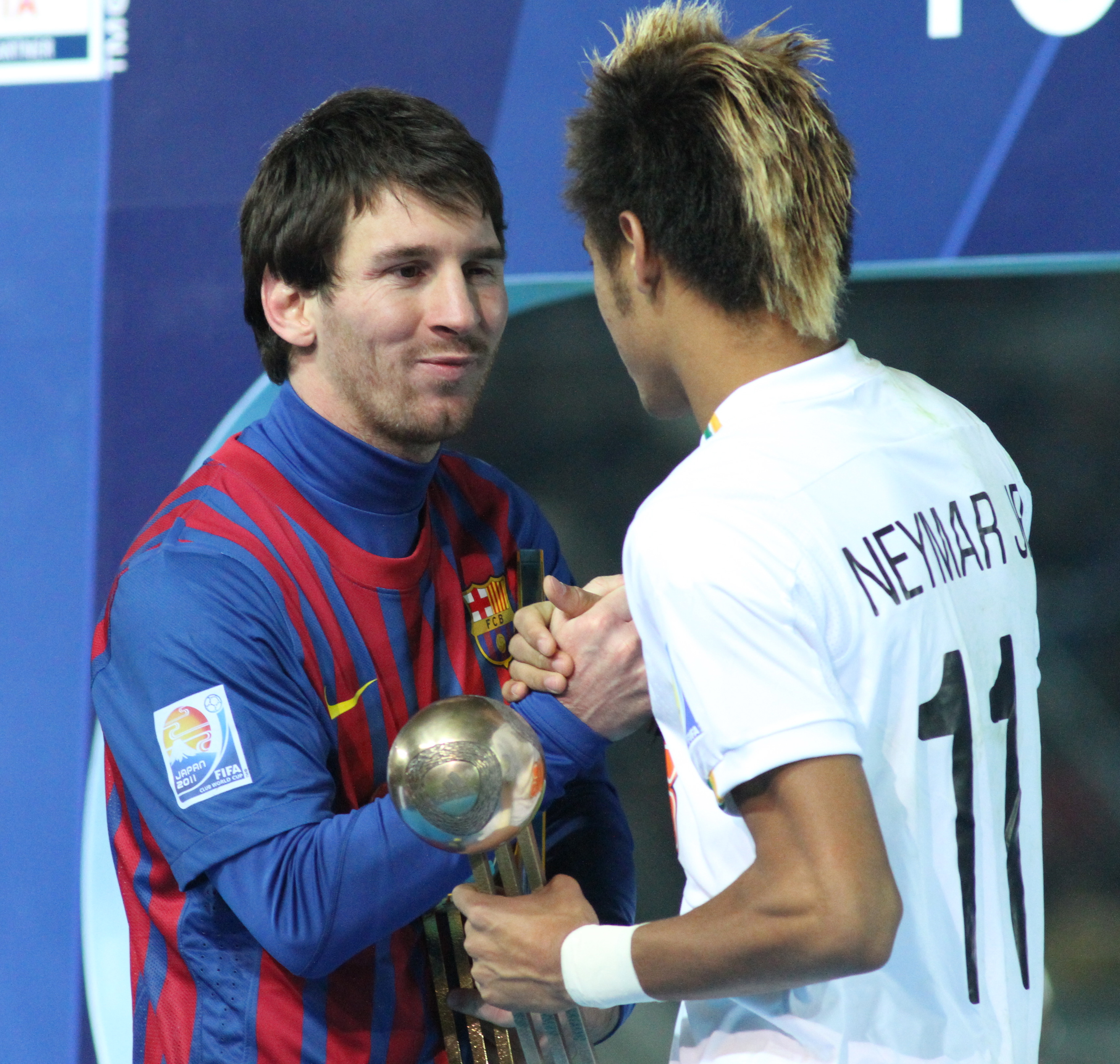
Lionel Messi and Neymar after the 2011 FIFA Club World Cup final, before becoming future teammates at Barcelona

Prior to the formation of MSN, Messi had achieved unprecedented feats in football, which included winning four Ballon d'Or awards consecutively from 2009 to 2012. Neymar joined Barcelona from his boyhood Brazilian club Santos FC in 2013 after emerging as one of the most sought-after young players in the world. During his debut season at Barcelona, he failed to replicate the form he had at Santos. Suárez signed from Liverpool in July 2014 for a reported fee of around €81 million after scoring 31 goals in the 2013–14 Premier League season. He was regarded as the best striker in the Premier League.

The trio first started together on 25 October 2014 in the first El Clásico of the 2014–15 season against Real Madrid at the Bernabéu stadium, which was the debut of Suárez (he was ineligible to make his debut earlier owing to a FIFA suspension), though Barcelona lost 3–1.

By February 2015, the media had noted a shift in Barcelona's style of play under new manager Luis Enrique, particularly through his use of the attacking trio of Messi, Suárez and Neymar. While Barcelona previously played under the traditional tiki-taka philosophy, the team had now adopted a more direct approach, relying mostly on the trio's individual quality in attack. Suárez's dynamic movement would create space for Messi and Neymar "to cut inside from the wings and wreak havoc."

== Impact ==
After a disappointing 2013–14 season for Barcelona, considered to be "their weakest since 2008", the emergence of MSN restored Barcelona into one of the most feared teams in the world again. By the end of 2014–15, MSN had proved to be pivotal to Barcelona completing the continental treble, scoring a combined 122 goals, which was the highest ever by an attacking trio in a single season at the time, a record they surpassed the following year with 131 goals. Between 2014 and 2017, they scored 364 goals and provided 174 assists, helping the club win nine trophies, including two La Liga titles, three Copa del Rey titles and the 2014–15 UEFA Champions League as part of the treble.

MSN became synonymous with Barcelona's identity during their tenure together and were instrumental in many Barcelona victories, including the 6–1 second leg victory against Paris Saint-Germain (PSG) in the 2016–17 Champions League round of 16, considered one of the greatest comebacks in football history. Prior to the match, Barcelona's defender Lucas Digne backed MSN to help the team overcome the first leg loss, whilst PSG's Julian Draxler highlighted the threat of MSN, saying "they can do everything". In 2017, a writer for Bleacher Report said, "Barcelona's front three of Lionel Messi, Luis Suárez and Neymar strike fear into opposition defences every time they take to the pitch, and everybody knows just how pivotal they are to the team's success." Following the Champions League fixture between Barcelona and English club Arsenal F.C. in 2016, their manager Arsène Wenger said: "We played against a team with the three best strikers I've ever seen [...] They can create a chance out of nothing."

The chemistry and unselfish play of MSN led some to consider them as the greatest attacking trio football has ever seen. In 2016, Barcelona captain Andrés Iniesta, who had previously played alongside the formidable attacking trio of Lionel Messi, Samuel Eto'o and Thierry Henry that helped Barcelona win the continental treble in 2008–09, described MSN as the superior partnership, calling Messi, Suárez and Neymar "the three best players I've ever seen". MSN's willingness to share goalscoring opportunities drew praise. Gerard Piqué, who played with MSN at Barcelona, drew attention to their selflessness and lack of ego considering that Messi was previously the "main star" at Barcelona, a position that Suárez was also used to when he was at Liverpool.

Following Neymar's departure to PSG in 2017, Barcelona struggled to emulate the level of attacking threat that MSN produced.

== Legacy ==
MSN continues to be celebrated and remembered highly by media outlets. In 2025, Goal ranked MSN as the greatest attacking trio of the 21st century. Besides the on-field quality of MSN, the personal long-lasting friendship between the three players has also been publicised. The trio have frequently been the subject of speculation over a reunion at professional level, particularly at American club Inter Miami, where Messi and Suárez currently play.

The acronym itself, MSN, inspired similar labels for other attacking trios, most notably Real Madrid's BBC (Gareth Bale, Karim Benzema and Cristiano Ronaldo) and PSG's MNM (Messi, Neymar and Kylian Mbappé). MSN often remains a benchmark in discussions about attacking trios in football. In 2024–25, Barcelona's attacking threat of Raphinha, Robert Lewandowski and Lamine Yamal drew comparisons to MSN. In 2026, German club FC Bayern Munich's attacking trio of Luis Díaz, Harry Kane and Michael Olise was also compared to MSN.
