= Cutral Có Messi Statue =

85-foot statue of football player Lionel Messi

- Cutral Co Messi Statue at night
- Location: Patagonia
- Designer: Aldo Beroisa
- Material: Steel; iron
- Height: 85-feet
- Weight: 70-tons

The Cutral Có Messi Statue is an 85-foot statue of professional Argentine football player Lionel Messi created in 2026 by Aldo Beroisa and revealed in Cutral Có, Argentina.

== Statue ==
The 85-foot Cutral Có Messi Statue is of Argentine football player Lionel Messi, created by Aldo Beroisa in 2026 and erected in Cutral Có, Neuquén Province, Argentina. It is made from 70 tons of steel and iron and took 18 months to complete.

Standing in Patagonia, along National Highway 22 and Manuel Savio Road at kilometer 1332 and described as the largest statue of Messi ever created, it depicts him on his knees clutching his jersey while pointing to the sky and with the FIFA World Cup Trophy won in Qatar in 2022 between his legs. The statue is "the second major tribute Argentina has dedicated to Messi".

== Reception ==
Many people criticized the statue for failing to look like Messi and also questioned the position of the World Cup Trophy.
