= Acindar =

Argentine steel company

- Trade name: Acindar Grupo ArcelorMittal
- Type: Private
- Industry: Ferrous metallurgy
- Founded: 1942
- Founder: Arturo Acevedo
- Headquarters: Villa Constitución, Santa Fe, Argentina
- Products: Steel
- Number of employees: 2341 (2018)
- Website: www.acindar.com.ar

Acindar (Industria Argentina de Aceros S.A.) is an Argentine company operating in the steel, agribusiness, industrial and construction sectors. It was founded in 1942 by a group of entrepreneurs led by engineer Arturo Acevedo. The company's headquarters are located in Villa Constitución and it operates production plants in Rosario, Villa Mercedes, La Tablada, and San Nicolás.

Since 2006, Acindar has been part of the ArcelorMittal Group. In 2008, ArcelorMittal acquired a 99.5% controlling stake in the company.

== History ==
Acindar Industria Argentina de Aceros was founded in 1942 through a partnership between Acevedo y Shaw and the Compañía de Construcciones Civiles de Aguirre y Aragón.

Acevedo, Shaw, Aguirre and Aragón were entrepreneurs in the construction industry. The company's operations began in the city of Rosario, where it produced reinforcing steel bars for the construction industry by melting locally sourced scrap metal.

A few years later, in 1946, General Manuel Savio introduced a bill outlining the National Steel Plan, which, among other provisions, called for the creation of the Argentine Mixed Steelmaking Company (Sociedad Mixta Siderúrgica Argentina, Somisa). The initial plan was to establish a steelworks that would be operational by 1951 in the town of San Nicolás de los Arroyos. The state would be responsible for steel production, while private companies would manufacture various finished products using the steel as raw material. In line with the plans for the creation of Somisa, Acindar underwent its first major expansion in 1951, opening the so-called "Plant 2" in Villa Constitución, approximately 20 km from the state-owned steelworks. In the years following the Revolución Libertadora, the company benefited from a series of measures introduced under Decree 9479/56 (during the Aramburu dictatorship), Decree 3042/62 (under the interim government of J. M. Guido), and Decree 2839/67 (under the de facto government of Onganía), which favored the company at the expense of the state-owned Somisa.

In 1961, the company's founder, Arturo Acevedo, was appointed Minister of Public Works of the Nation under President Arturo Frondizi. During his tenure, part of Argentina's railway restructuring plan, known as the Larkin Plan, was carried out. Among other measures, the plan called for rolling stock, equipment, and railway facilities to be scrapped. Acindar was one of the companies that purchased these materials for use as raw materials in its production process.

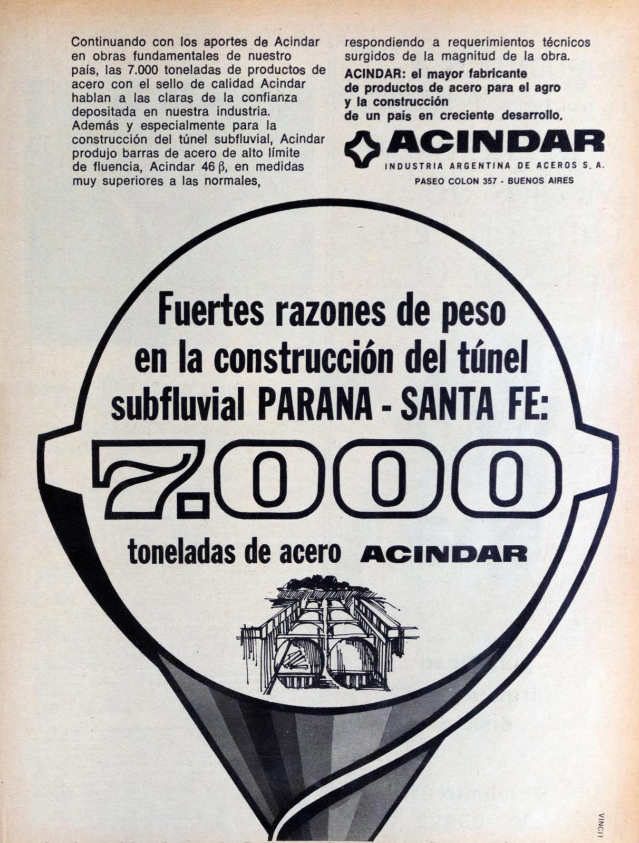
Acindar advertisement for the Subfluvial Tunnel

Arturo Acevedo died in 1968, leaving the company in the hands of his sons Arturo and Jorge, who were responsible for technical and commercial management, respectively. The chairmanship of the board of directors was assumed by José Alfredo Martínez de Hoz, who had until then served as the company's statutory auditor. The economist remained chairman until March 1976, when he was appointed Minister of Economy of the Nation under the National Reorganization Process. The new chairman in 1976 was General Alcides López Aufranc, who remained in the position until 1992. In 1982, the company, along with other business groups, benefited from a series of measures adopted by the Central Bank, which was then headed by Domingo Cavallo. These measures resulted in the nationalization of private-sector debts, effectively providing companies with debt relief through the "dilution of liabilities" policy introduced by Martínez de Hoz and Domingo Cavallo.

== Industrial plants ==
The company's main production facility is located in Villa Constitución. It also operates industrial plants in Rosario, Villa Mercedes, La Tablada and San Nicolás.

== Products and services ==
Acindar manufactures grinding bars and steel grinding balls for mineral processing, as well as steel mesh for the mining industry; wire, tensioning systems and specialized posts for the wine industry; posts, rods, wire and accessories for steel fencing used in the agricultural sector; and a wide range of products for the construction industry. The company also produces specialized products for the metalworking industry, the oil industry, and other sectors. In addition, Acindar provides technical consulting services and, particularly for the construction sector, offers steel cutting, bending and prefabrication services tailored to customers' technical specifications.

== Bibliography ==
- Responsabilidad empresarial en delitos de lesa humanidad: represión a trabajadores durante el terrorismo de Estado (PDF). Tomo I. Ministerio de Justicia y Derechos Humanos. 2016. ISBN 978-950-579-429-4.
