= Antonela Roccuzzo =

Argentine influencer (born 1988)

- Born: 26 February 1988 (age 38); Rosario, Argentina
- Occupation: Influencer
- Spouse: Lionel Messi (m. 2017)
- Children: 3

Instagram information
- Page: antonelaroccuzzo
- Followers: 41.9 million (7 October 2026)

Antonela Roccuzzo (born 26 February 1988) is an Argentine influencer best known for being the wife of footballer Lionel Messi.

== Career ==
Roccuzzo studied dentistry at the National University of Rosario, but later changed her major to social communication, only to drop out later at the age of 19. She is an ambassador for several philanthropic organisations, most notably the United Nations International Children's Emergency Fund (UNICEF) and the Special Olympics. In April 2023, she endorsed the UNICEF's #GuardavidasDeLaInfancia campaign to combat poverty and human rights violations against children in Argentina.

Roccuzzo has modelled with several brands including Adidas, Alo Yoga and Ricky Sarkany, and has worked with English fashion designer Stella McCartney.

== Personal life ==
Roccuzzo was born and raised in Rosario, Argentina. She met Lionel Messi through her cousin Lucas Scaglia when she and Messi were toddlers. In 2009, Roccuzzo and Messi confirmed their relationship to the press. They married on June 30th, 2017 and have three sons.
