= FIFA World Player Gala =

Association football award

FIFA World Player Gala Awards
- Awarded for: Excellence in association football team and individual achievements
- Location: Zürich, Switzerland
- Presented by: FIFA
- First award: 8 December 1991
- Website: web.archive.org/web/20110728154133/http://www.fifa.com/classicfootball/awards/gala/archive/index.html

FIFA World Player Gala was an association football award show presented annually by the sport's governing body, FIFA, throughout 1991–2009.

The first awarding ceremony was held on 8 December 1991 in Zürich, Switzerland. The award show was superseded first by the FIFA Ballon d'Or during 2010-15, and since 2016 by The Best FIFA Football Awards. FIFA consider the three historic versions of its gala show as subversions of the same event, and thus celebrated its 30 years anniversary in 2021. FIFA's historical statistics also list the awards in one overall list, comprising the records of all three gala show versions.

== Awards by year ==
=== 1991 awards ===
- World Player of the year: Lothar MATTHAEUS (GER)
- FIFA Fair Play Award: Real Federación Española de Fútbol (Spanish FA), JORGINHO (BRA)

=== 1992 awards ===
- World Player of the year: Marco VAN BASTEN (NED)
- FIFA Fair Play Award: Union Royale Belge des Sociétés de Football Association

=== 1993 awards ===
- World Player of the year: Roberto BAGGIO (ITA)
- FIFA Fair Play Award: Nandor Hidgekuti, (individual award) (HUM), Football Association of Zambia
- Top Team of the Year Award: Germany
- Best Mover of the Year: Colombia

=== 1994 awards ===
- World Player of the year: ROMARIO (BRA)
- Top Team of the Year Award: Brazil
- Best Mover of the Year: Croatia

=== 1995 awards ===
- World Player of the year: George WEAH (LBR)
- FIFA Fair Play Award: Jacques Glassmann (FRA)
- Top Team of the Year Award: Brazil
- Best Mover of the Year: Jamaica

=== 1996 awards ===
- World Player of the year: RONALDO (BRA)
- FIFA Fair Play Award: George WEAH (LBR)
- Top Team of the Year Award: Brazil
- Best Mover of the Year: South Africa

=== 1997 awards ===
- World Player of the year: RONALDO (BRA)
- FIFA Fair Play Award: Irish spectators of the World Cup preliminary match versus Belgium, Jozef Zovinec (Slovak amateur player), Julie FOUDY (USA)
- Top Team of the Year Award: Brazil
- Best Mover of the Year: Yugoslavia

=== 1998 awards ===
- World Player of the year: Zinedine ZIDANE (FRA)
- FIFA Fair Play Award: The national associations of Iran, the USA and Northern Ireland
- Top Team of the Year Award: Brazil
- Best Mover of the Year: Croatia

=== 1999 awards ===
- World Player of the year: RIVALDO (BRA)
- FIFA Fair Play Award: New Zealand’s football community
- Top Team of the Year Award: Brazil
- Best Mover of the Year: Slovenia

=== 2000 awards ===
- World Player of the year: Zinedine ZIDANE (FRA)
- FIFA Fair Play Award: Lucas RADEBE (RSA)
- Top Team of the Year Award: Netherlands
- Best Mover of the Year: Nigeria

=== 2001 awards ===
- World Player of the year: LUIS FIGO (POR)
- Women's World Player of the Year: Mia HAMM (USA)
- FIFA Presidential award: Marvin Lee (TRI)
- Top Team of the Year Award: Honduras
- Best Mover of the Year: Costa Rica

=== 2002 awards ===
- World Player of the year: RONALDO (BRA)
- Women's World Player of the Year: Mia HAMM (USA)
- FIFA Presidential award: Parminder Nagra (ENG)
- FIFA Fair Play Award: Football communities of Japan and Korea Republic
- Top Team of the Year Award: Brazil
- Best Mover of the Year: Senegal

=== 2003 awards ===
- World Player of the year: Zinedine ZIDANE (FRA)
- Women's World Player of the Year: Birgit PRINZ (GER)
- FIFA Presidential award: The Iraqi Football Community
- FIFA Fair Play Award: Fans of Glasgow Celtic FC (SCO)
- Top Team of the Year Award: Brazil
- Best Mover of the Year: Bahrain

=== 2004 awards ===
- World Player of the year: RONALDINHO (BRA)
- Women's World Player of the Year: Birgit PRINZ (GER)
- FIFA Presidential award: Haiti
- FIFA Fair Play Award: Confederaçao Brasileira de Futebol
- Top Team of the Year Award: Brazil
- Best Mover of the Year: China PR
- FIFA Interactive World Player: Thiago Carrico de Azevedo

=== 2005 awards ===
- World Player of the year: RONALDINHO (BRA)
- Women's World Player of the Year: Birgit PRINZ (GER)
- FIFA Presidential award: FRISK Anders (SWE)
- FIFA Fair Play Award: football community of Iquitos (Peru)
- Top Team of the Year Award: Brazil
- Best Mover of the Year: Ghana
- FIFA Interactive World Player: Chris Bullard

=== 2006 awards ===
- World Player of the year: Fabio CANNAVARO (ITA)
- Women's World Player of the Year: MARTA (BRA)
- FIFA Presidential award: Giacinto FACCHETTI (ITA)
- FIFA Fair Play Award: Brazil, Spain
- Top Team of the Year Award: Brazil
- Best Mover of the Year: Italy
- FIFA Interactive World Player: Andries Smit

=== 2007 awards ===
- World Player of the year: KAKA (BRA)
- Women's World Player of the year: MARTA (BRA)
- FIFA Presidential award: PELÉ (Edson Arantes do Nascimento) (BRA)
- FIFA Fair Play Award: FC Barcelona
- Best Mover of the Year: Mozambique
- FIFA Interactive World Player: Alfonso Ramos

=== 2008 awards ===
- World Player of the year: CRISTIANO RONALDO (POR)
- Women's World Player of the year: MARTA (BRA)
- FIFA Presidential award: Women's Football
- FIFA Fair Play Award: Armenia, Turkey
- FIFA Development Award: Palestine

=== 2009 awards ===
- World Player of the year: Lionel MESSI (ARG)
- Women's World Player of the year: MARTA (BRA)
- FIFA Presidential award: Her Majesty Queen Rania Al Abdullah of Jordan
- FIFA Fair Play Award: Bobby ROBSON (ENG)
- FIFA Development Award: Chinese Football Association
- FIFA Puskás Award:
  - Cristiano Ronaldo for the 1-0 goal scored in the 2008–09 UEFA Champions League match between Manchester United and Porto.
- FIFA/FIFPro World XI:
  - Iker Casillas (goalkeeper, Real Madrid)
  - Patrice Evra (defender, Manchester United)
  - John Terry (defender, Chelsea)
  - Nemanja Vidić (defender, Manchester United)
  - Dani Alves (defender, Barcelona)
  - Andrés Iniesta (midfielder, Barcelona)
  - Xavi (midfielder, Barcelona)
  - Steven Gerrard (midfielder, Liverpool)
  - Cristiano Ronaldo (forward, Manchester United/Real Madrid)
  - Fernando Torres (forward, Liverpool)
  - Lionel Messi (forward, Barcelona)

== Awards by name ==
Official awards given at the annual FIFA World Player Gala (note most awards were continuously given by FIFA after 2009 - just under a different FIFA Gala name):

- FIFA World Player of the year (1991-2009)
- FIFA Women's World Player of the Year (2001-2009)
- FIFA Fair Play Award (1991-2009)
- FIFA Presidential Award (2001-2009)
- FIFA Interactive World Player Champion (2004-2009)
- FIFA Puskás Award (2009)
- FIFA FIFPRO Men's World 11 (2009)
- FIFA Development Award (2008-2009)
- Top Team of the Year (1993-2006)
- Best Mover of the Year (1993-2007)

== See also ==
- FIFA Ballon d'Or (name of the annual FIFA gala show in 2010-15)
- The Best FIFA Football Awards (name of the annual FIFA gala show since 2016)
- FIFA World Player of the Year
- Ballon d'Or
