= The Best FIFA Women's Player =

International football award

- Current: The Best FIFA Football Awards 2025
- Presented by: FIFA
- Formerly called: FIFA Women's World Player of the Year (2001–2015)
- First award: 2016
- Current holder: (Spain) Aitana Bonmati (3rd award)

Highlights
- Most wins: (Spain) Aitana Bonmati (3 awards)
- Website: fifa.com

The Best FIFA Women's Player is a football award presented annually by the sport's governing body, FIFA, since 2016, to honour the player deemed to have performed the best over the previous calendar year. From 2001 to 2015, the award was known as the FIFA Women's World Player of the Year.

== History ==
The selection criteria for the players of the year are: sporting performance, as well as general conduct on and off the pitch.

The votes are decided by media representatives, national team coaches, and national team captains. In October 2016, it was announced that the general public would also be allowed to vote. Each group has 25% of the overall vote.

At the 2017 awards, 2016 FIFA U-17 Women's World Cup Bronze Ball and Bronze Shoe winner and amateur club player Deyna Castellanos was nominated. Professional players Megan Rapinoe and Sam Kerr criticized the nomination.

== Winners ==
Year	Rank	Player	Team(s)	Votes
2016	1st	(United States) Carli Lloyd	(United States) Houston Dash	20.68%
2016	2nd	(Brazil) Marta	(Sweden) FC Rosengård	16.60%
2016	3rd	(Germany) Melanie Behringer	(Germany) Bayern Munich	12.34%
2017	1st	(Netherlands) Lieke Martens	(Spain) Barcelona (Note: Martens was signed by Barcelona from FC Rosengård midway through 2017.)	21.72%
2017	2nd	(United States) Carli Lloyd	(United States) Houston Dash (Note: Lloyd was on loan from the Houston Dash to Manchester City (FAWSL) from February to May 2017.)	16.28%
2017	3rd	(Venezuela) Deyna Castellanos	(United States) Santa Clarita Blue Heat (Note: Castellanos was signed by Santa Clarita Blue Heat from Florida State Seminoles midway through 2017.)	11.69%
2018	1st	(Brazil) Marta	(United States) Orlando Pride	14.73%
2018	2nd	(Germany) Dzsenifer Marozsán	(France) Lyon	12.86%
2018	3rd	(Norway) Ada Hegerberg	(France) Lyon	12.60%
2019	1st	(United States) Megan Rapinoe	(United States) Reign FC	46
2019	2nd	(United States) Alex Morgan	(United States) Orlando Pride	42
2019	3rd	(England) Lucy Bronze	(France) Lyon	29
2020	1st	(England) Lucy Bronze	(England) Manchester City (Note: Bronze was signed by Manchester City from Lyon midway through 2020.)	52
2020	2nd	(Denmark) Pernille Harder	(England) Chelsea	40
2020	3rd	(France) Wendie Renard	(France) Lyon	35
2021	1st	(Spain) Alexia Putellas	(Spain) Barcelona	52
2021	2nd	(Australia) Sam Kerr	(England) Chelsea	38
2021	3rd	(Spain) Jenni Hermoso	(Spain) Barcelona	33
2022	1st	(Spain) Alexia Putellas	(Spain) Barcelona	50
2022	2nd	(United States) Alex Morgan	(United States) Orlando Pride; (United States) San Diego Wave	37
2022	3rd	(England) Beth Mead	(England) Arsenal	37
2023	1st	(Spain) Aitana Bonmatí	(Spain) Barcelona	52
2023	2nd	(Colombia) Linda Caicedo	(Colombia) Deportivo Cali; (Spain) Real Madrid	40
2023	3rd	(Spain) Jenni Hermoso	(Mexico) Pachuca	36
2024	1st	(Spain) Aitana Bonmatí	(Spain) Barcelona	52
2024	2nd	(Zambia) Barbra Banda	(China) Shanghai Shengli; (United States) Orlando Pride	39
2024	3rd	(Norway) Caroline Graham Hansen	(Spain) Barcelona	37
2025	1st	(Spain) Aitana Bonmatí	(Spain) Barcelona	52
2025	2nd	(Spain) Mariona Caldentey	(England) Arsenal	40
2025	3rd	(Spain) Alexia Putellas	(Spain) Barcelona	33

=== Wins by player ===
Player	1st	2nd	3rd
(Spain) Aitana Bonmatí	3 (2023, 2024, 2025)	—	—
(Spain) Alexia Putellas	2 (2021, 2022)	—	1 (2025)
(United States) Carli Lloyd	1 (2016)	1 (2017)	—
(Brazil) Marta	1 (2018)	1 (2016)	—
(England) Lucy Bronze	1 (2020)	—	1 (2019)
(Netherlands) Lieke Martens	1 (2017)	—	—
(United States) Megan Rapinoe	1 (2019)	—	—

=== Wins by country ===
Country	Players	Total
Spain	2	5
United States	2	2
Netherlands	1	1
Brazil	1	1
England	1	1

=== Wins by club ===
Club	Players	Total
(Spain) Barcelona	3	6
(United States) Houston Dash	1	1
(United States) Orlando Pride	1	1
(United States) Reign FC	1	1
(England) Manchester City	1	1

== FIFA Women's Player of the Year (including predecessors) ==
Players	FIFA Women's World Player of the Year (2001–2015)	The Best FIFA Women's Player (2016–present)	Total
(Brazil) Marta	5	1	6
(Spain) Aitana Bonmatí	—	3	3
(Germany) Birgit Prinz	3	—	3
(United States) Mia Hamm	2	—	2
(United States) Carli Lloyd	1	1	2
(Spain) Alexia Putellas	—	2	2
(Japan) Homare Sawa	1	—	1
(United States) Abby Wambach	1	—	1
(Germany) Nadine Angerer	1	—	1
(Germany) Nadine Keßler	1	—	1
(Netherlands) Lieke Martens	—	1	1
(United States) Megan Rapinoe	—	1	1
(England) Lucy Bronze	—	1	1

=== Wins by player ===
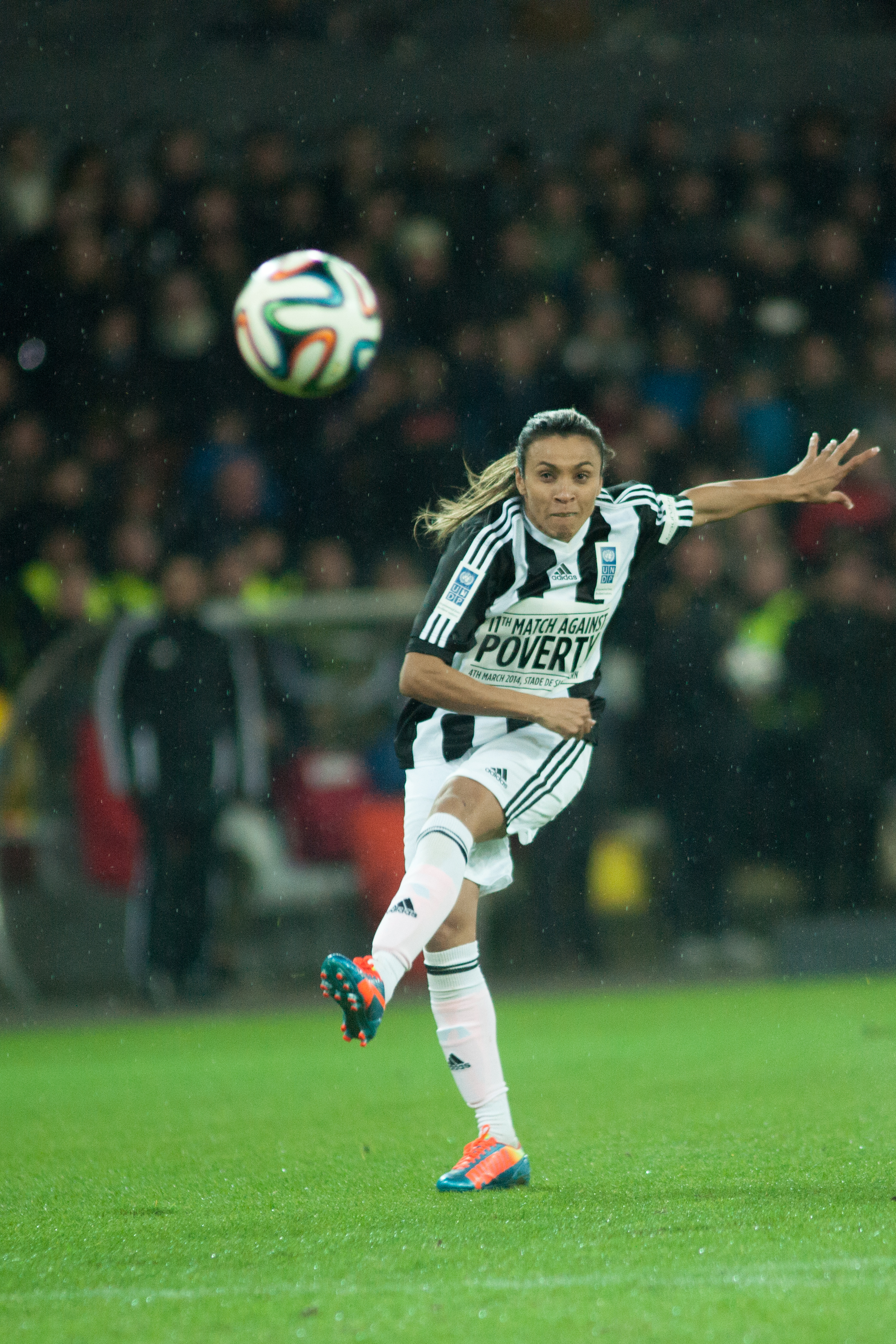
Marta won FIFA's top Women's player award for a record 6th time.

Player	Winner	Second place	Third place
(Brazil) Marta	6 (2006, 2007, 2008, 2009, 2010, 2018)	5 (2005, 2011, 2012, 2014, 2016)	2 (2004, 2013)
(Germany) Birgit Prinz	3 (2003, 2004, 2005)	5 (2002, 2007, 2008, 2009, 2010)	—
(Spain) Aitana Bonmatí	3 (2023, 2024, 2025)	—	—
(United States) Mia Hamm	2 (2001, 2002)	2 (2003, 2004)	—
(United States) Carli Lloyd	2 (2015, 2016)	1 (2017)	—
(Spain) Alexia Putellas	2 (2021, 2022)	—	1 (2025)
(United States) Abby Wambach	1 (2012)	1 (2013)	2 (2011, 2014)
(England) Lucy Bronze	1 (2020)	—	1 (2019)
(Japan) Homare Sawa	1 (2011)	—	—
(Germany) Nadine Angerer	1 (2013)	—	—
(Germany) Nadine Keßler	1 (2014)	—	—
(Netherlands) Lieke Martens	1 (2017)	—	—
(United States) Megan Rapinoe	1 (2019)	—	—

=== Wins by country ===
Country	Players	Total
United States	4	6
Brazil	1	6
Germany	3	5
Spain	2	5
Japan	1	1
Netherlands	1	1
England	1	1

=== Wins by club ===
Club	Players	Total
(Spain) Barcelona	3	6
(Germany) 1. FFC Frankfurt	1	3
(Sweden) Umeå IK	1	3
(United States) Washington Freedom	1	2
(United States) Houston Dash	1	2
(Brazil) Santos	1	1
(United States) FC Gold Pride	1	1
(Japan) INAC Kobe Leonessa	1	1
(Australia) Brisbane Roar	1	1
(Germany) VfL Wolfsburg	1	1
(United States) Orlando Pride	1	1
(United States) Reign FC	1	1
(England) Manchester City	1	1

== See also ==
- List of sports awards honoring women
- The Best FIFA Football Awards
- Ballon d'Or Féminin
