= Football in Ghana =

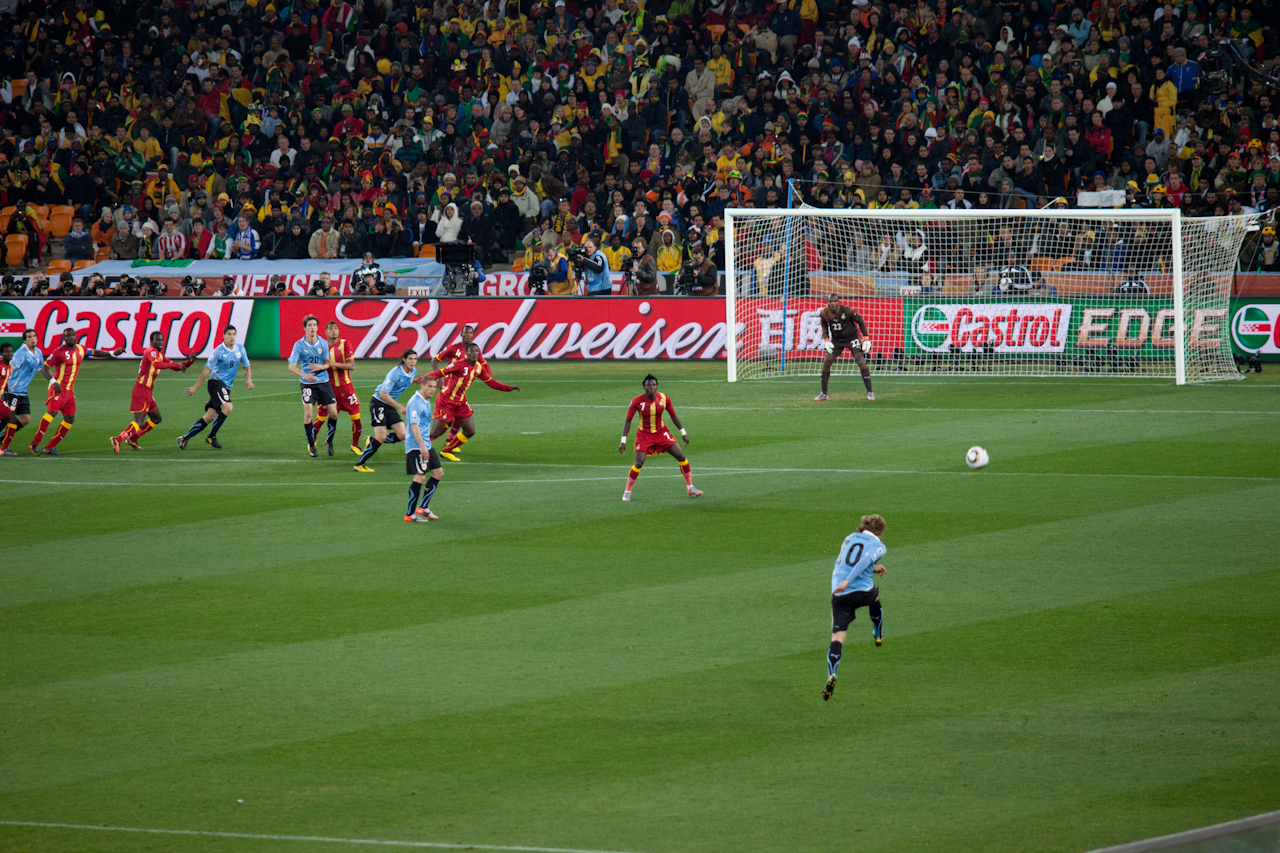
- Ghana players (in red and yellow) in action against Uruguay at the 2010 FIFA World Cup
- Country: Ghana
- Governing body: Ghana Football Association
- National team: Men's · Women's

National competitions
- Africa Cup of Nations; FIFA World Cup

Club competitions
- Ghana Premier League; Division One League

International competitions
- CAF Champions League; CAF Confederation Cup; CAF Super Cup; FIFA Club World Cup

Association football is the most popular sport in Ghana. Approximately 55% of the people in Ghana are considered association football fans. Since 1957, the sport has been administered by the Ghana Football Association. Internationally, Ghana is represented by the male Black Stars and the female Black Queens. The top male domestic football league in Ghana is the Ghana Premier League, and the top female domestic football league in Ghana is the Ghana Women's Football League.

== History ==
It is on record that the game of football was introduced into the Gold Coast region towards the close of the 19th century by merchants from Europe. Sailors during their leisure times played football among themselves and sometimes with a select side of the indigenous people. The popularity of the game spread within a short time along the coast culminating in the formation of the first football club, Excelsior, in 1903 by Mr. Briton, a Jamaican-born Briton, who was then the Head Teacher of Philip Quaicoe Government Boys School in Cape Coast.

== Ghana national men's football team ==
The Black Stars team is one of the highly rated national football teams in Africa. Ghana has won the African Cup of Nations championships on four occasions. They also reached the last sixteen of the 2006 FIFA World Cup before being eliminated by the Brazil. At the 2010 FIFA World Cup in South Africa, they became the third African team in history to reach the World Cup quarter-finals. Some illustrious players have been Charles Kumi Gyamfi, Abédi Pelé, Abdul Razak, Tony Yeboah, Samuel Kuffour and Michael Essien.

The youth teams have been successful as well. The U-17 team regularly competes in the FIFA U-17 World Cup and has won it twice and were runners-up twice. The U-20 team were runners-up twice in the FIFA U-20 World Cup, and in 2009 the Black Satellites completed the double by winning the 2009 African Youth Championship and being crowned 2009 U-20 World Cup Champions thus becoming the first African Country to win the U-20 World Cup Championship. In 1992, Olympic U-23 team became the first African country to win a medal at Olympic Games football and in 2011 the Black Meteors were crowned 2011 All-Africa Games champions for the first time. Former Black Stars senior squad members such as Sulley Muntari, Michael Essien, John Mensah and captain Stephen Appiah all got their start at these youth tournaments.

In 2014, Ghana was one of the eight nations to take part in the first Unity World Cup.

=== Top goalscorers ===
As of 26 June 2014, the players with the most goals for the senior Ghanaian national team are:

#	Player	FM	WCQ	CANQ	CAN	WC	Overall	Caps	Image of player
1	Asamoah; Gyan	18	10	2	6	6	42	59	Asamoah Gyan is the leading goalscorer for Ghana and is currently plying trade at Al Ain.
2	Edward; Acquah						40		
2	Kwasi; Owusu						40		
3	Abédi; Pélé						33	67	Abédi Pélé is the 4th highest goalscorer for Ghana.
4	Tony; Yeboah						29	59	
Last updated: Ghana - Portugal (2014 World Cup), 26 June 2014.

== Ghana national women's football team ==
The Black Queens have taken part in all the FIFA Women's World Cup championships since 1999. The team has however failed to go beyond the first round on each occasion. Ghana has also been runner up to Nigeria on three occasions in the African Women's Championships. Two Ghanaians, Alberta Sackey and Adjoa Bayor have been voted African Women Player of the Year.

== Football academies ==
Since the late 1990s, European clubs and entrepreneurs have started establishing football academies in Ghana. Among the first ones were Ajax, Feyenoord, and Right to Dream. Unlike other youth teams in Ghana (also known as colts), academies offer an educational setting alongside football training. In the 2010s, locally-based academies have started to spring up across the country. King James Asuming established Kumasi Sports Academy in Kumasi, which, unlike most academies in Ghana, offers a program for boys and girls. Kumasi Sports Academy kickstarted the career of multiple female footballers, including Blessing Shine Agbomadzi, defender for the Black Queens. Ernest Kufuor established Unistar Soccer Academy in the town of Kasoa-Ofaakor. Dozens of footballers started playing at Unistar, including Lumor Agbenyenu, defender for the Black Stars. Unistar is also known for its urban impact. Many of the town's residents attested that Unistar had attracted new visitors, businesses and residents, improving the town’s infrastructures and general wellbeing. Mandela Soccer Academy was established in Accra by Mohammed Issa with a main goal of leveraging football’s universal appeal to advance broader visions of youth and community empowerment. Patmos Arhin, who currently plays for Turkish club Boluspor, played at Mandela Soccer Academy for several years.

== Notable players ==
=== African Player of the Year and notable players ===
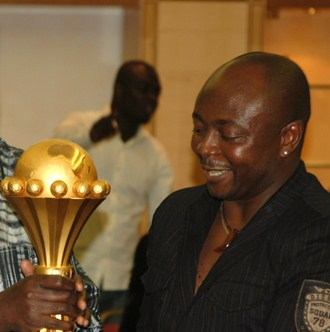
Abédi Pelé is a three time African Footballer of the Year winner. He is Ghana's most successful football player and highest goalscorer of the Ghana national team to date, and has received the Golden Foot award.

In the 1990s, Abédi Pelé and Anthony Yeboah received FIFA World Player of the Year top ten nominations: the following decade Sammy Kuffour and Michael Essien received Ballon d'Or nominations. Abédi Pelé was listed in the 2004 "FIFA 100" greatest living footballers.

On 13 January 2007, the Confederation of African Football voted Abédi Pelé, Michael Essien, Tony Yeboah, Karim Abdul Razak and Samuel Kuffour as members of the CAF top 30 best African players of all-time. In addition, Abédi and Yeboah were voted as among of the best African players of the century in 1999 by IFFHS.

Men

- Abédi Pelé – FIFA 100, WPOY Nom.1991, 9th 1992, 1991, 1992, 1993 APOY Winner, APOY Nom. 85, 86, 87, 88, 89, 90, 5th Best African Player of All-Time
- Karim Abdul Razak – 1978 APOY Winner, 6th 1983, 26th Best African Player of All-Time
- Ibrahim Sunday – 1971 APOY Winner
- Samuel Kuffour – Ballon d'Or Nom. 2001, APOY Runner-up 1999, 2001, 27th Best African Player of All-Time
- Tony Yeboah – WPOY 9th 1993, Ballon d'Or 23rd 1995, APOY Runner-up 1993, 3rd 1992, 6th 1991, 10th 1996, 24th Best African Player of All-Time
- Michael Essien – FIFA World Player of the Year – 22nd 2005, 22nd 2006, 15th 2007; Ballon d'Or – 24th 2007 27th 2006, 22nd 2005; APOY – 2nd 2007, 3rd 2006, 3rd 2005, 11th Best African Player of All-Time

Women

- Alberta Sackey – 2002 AWPOY Winner
- Adjoa Bayor – 2003 AWPOY Winner

== Support ==
Twitter research from 2015 found that the most popular English Premier League club in Ghana was Chelsea, with 26% of Ghanaian Premier League fans following the club, followed by Manchester United (18%) and Arsenal (15%).

== Attendances ==
The average attendance per top-flight football league season and the club with the highest average attendance:

Season	League average	Best club	Best club average
2024-25	2,134	Asante Kotoko	20,381
2023-24	1,236	Asante Kotoko	11,284

Sources: League pages on Wikipedia

== See also ==
- List of football stadiums in Ghana
