= FIFA World Player of the Year =

Association football award

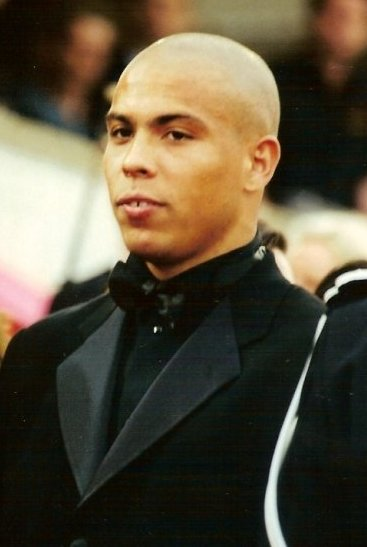
- Ronaldo, the youngest recipient of the award aged 20, won it three times.
- Presented by: FIFA
- First award: 1991
- Final award: 2009

Highlights
- Most awards: (France) Zinedine Zidane (Brazil) Ronaldo (3 awards each)
- Website: fifa.com
- Related: FIFA Ballon d'Or; The Best FIFA Men's Player

FIFA Women's World Player of the Year
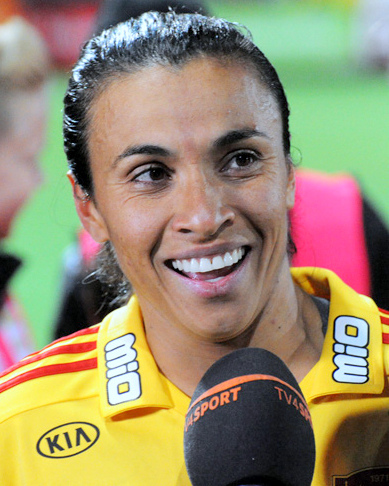
- Marta, the youngest recipient of the award aged 20, won it five times.
- Presented by: FIFA
- First award: 2001
- Final award: 2015

Highlights
- Most awards: (Brazil) Marta (5 awards)
- Website: fifa.com
- Related: The Best FIFA Women's Player

The FIFA World Player of the Year was an association football award presented annually by the sport's governing body, FIFA, between 1991 and 2015 at the FIFA World Player Gala. Coaches and captains of international teams and media representatives selected the player they deem to have performed the best in the previous calendar year.

Originally a single award for the world's best men's player, parallel awards for men and women were awarded from 2001 to 2009. The men's award was subsumed into the FIFA Ballon d'Or in 2010 while the women's award remained until 2015. After 2015 both men's and women's awards became part of The Best FIFA Football Awards.

During the men's era, Brazilian players won 8 out of 19 years, compared to three wins – the second most – for French players. In terms of individual players, Brazil again led with five, followed by Italy and Portugal with two each. The youngest winner was Ronaldo, who won at 20 years old in 1996, and the oldest winner was Fabio Cannavaro, who won aged 33 in 2006. Ronaldo and Zinedine Zidane each won the award three times, while Ronaldo and Ronaldinho were the only players to win in successive years. From 2010 to 2015, the equivalent men's award was the FIFA Ballon d'Or, following a merging of the FIFA World Player of the Year and the France Football Ballon d'Or awards. Since 2016, the awards have been replaced by The Best FIFA Men's Player and The Best FIFA Women's Player awards.

Eight women's footballers – three Germans, three Americans, one Brazilian, and one Japanese – have won the award. Marta, the youngest recipient at age 20 in 2006, has won five successive awards, the most of any player. Birgit Prinz won three times in a row and Mia Hamm won twice in a row. The oldest winner is Nadine Angerer, who was 35 when she won in 2013; she is also the only goalkeeper of either sex to win.

== Voting and selection process ==
The winners are chosen by the coaches and captains of national teams as well as by international media representatives invited by FIFA. In a voting system based on positional voting, each voter is allotted three votes, worth five points, three points and one point, and the three finalists are ordered based on total number of points. Following criticism from some sections of the media over nominations in previous years, FIFA has since 2004 provided shortlists from which its voters can select their choices.

== FIFA World Player of the Year ==
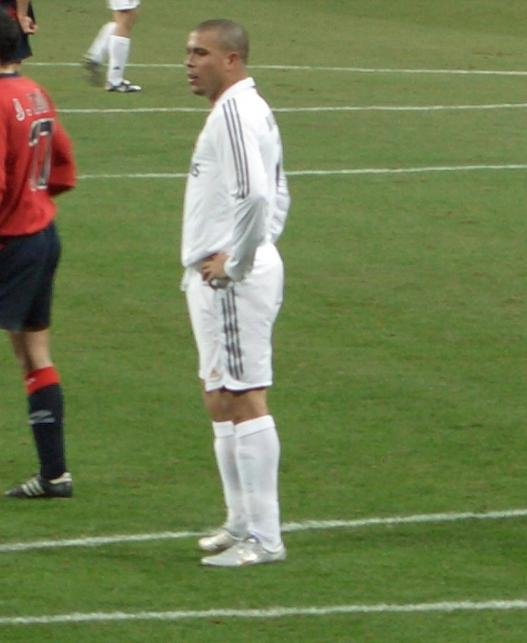
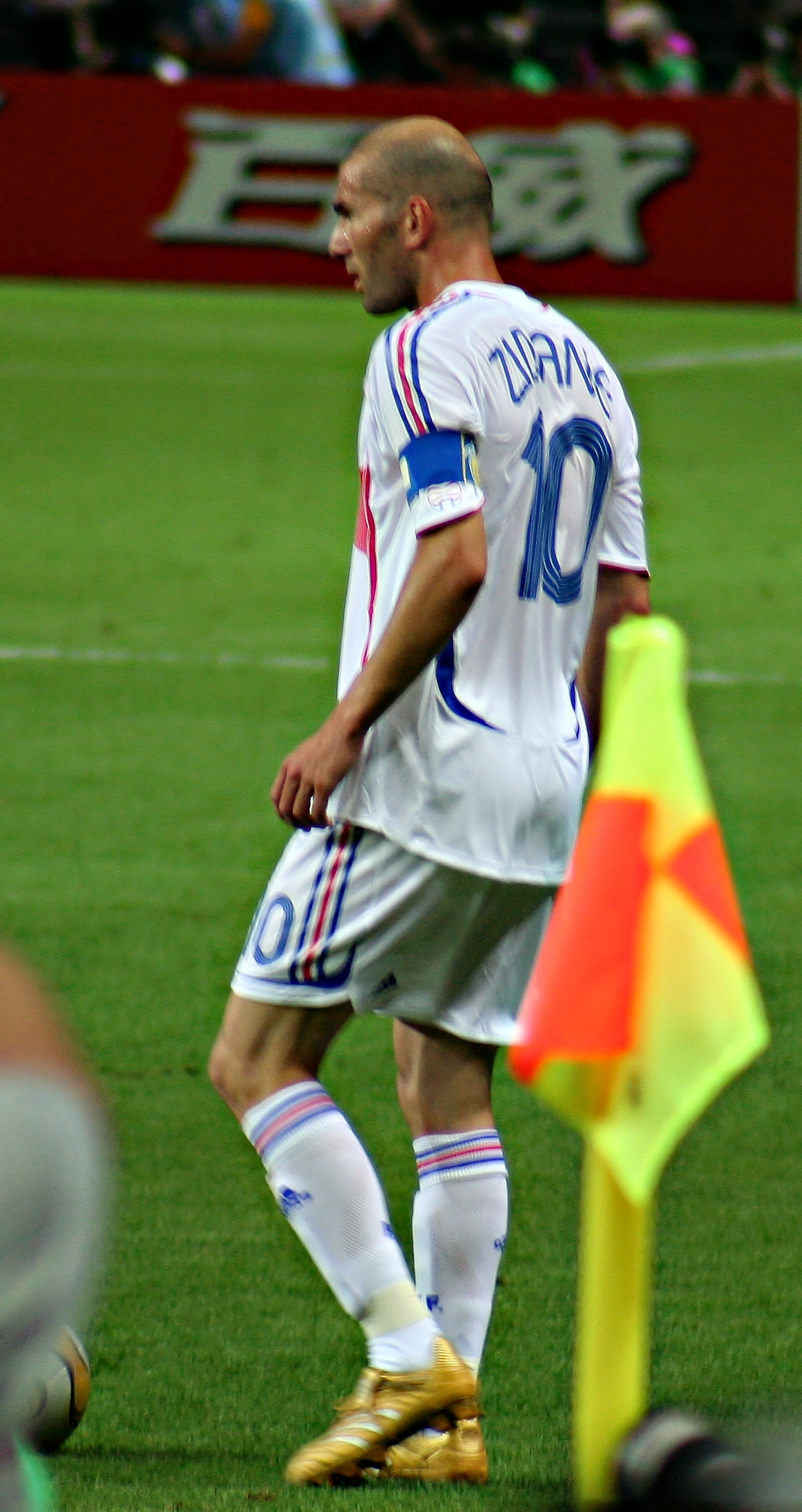
Ronaldo (left) and Zinedine Zidane (right) each won the award three times.

Year	Rank	Player	Team	Points
1991	1st	(Germany) Lothar Matthäus	(Italy) Inter Milan	128
1991	2nd	(France) Jean-Pierre Papin	(France) Marseille	113
1991	3rd	(England) Gary Lineker	(England) Tottenham Hotspur	40
1992	1st	(Netherlands) Marco van Basten	(Italy) Milan	166
1992	2nd	(Bulgaria) Hristo Stoichkov	(Spain) Barcelona	88
1992	3rd	(Germany) Thomas Häßler	(Italy) Roma	61
1993	1st	(Italy) Roberto Baggio	(Italy) Juventus	152
1993	2nd	(Brazil) Romário (Note: Romário was signed by Barcelona from PSV Eindhoven midway through 1993.)	(Spain) Barcelona	84
1993	3rd	(Netherlands) Dennis Bergkamp (Note: Bergkamp was signed by Inter Milan from Ajax midway through 1993.)	(Italy) Inter Milan	58
1994	1st	(Brazil) Romário	(Spain) Barcelona	346
1994	2nd	(Bulgaria) Hristo Stoichkov	(Spain) Barcelona	100
1994	3rd	(Italy) Roberto Baggio	(Italy) Juventus	80
1995	1st	(Liberia) George Weah (Note: Weah was signed by Milan from Paris Saint-Germain midway through 1995.)	(Italy) Milan	170
1995	2nd	(Italy) Paolo Maldini	(Italy) Milan	80
1995	3rd	(Germany) Jürgen Klinsmann (Note: Klinsmann was signed by Bayern Munich from Tottenham Hotspur midway through 1995.)	(Germany) Bayern Munich	58
1996	1st	(Brazil) Ronaldo (Note: Ronaldo was signed by Barcelona from PSV Eindhoven midway through 1996.)	(Spain) Barcelona	329
1996	2nd	(Liberia) George Weah	(Italy) Milan	140
1996	3rd	(England) Alan Shearer (Note: Shearer was signed by Newcastle United from Blackburn Rovers midway through 1996.)	(England) Newcastle United	123
1997	1st	(Brazil) Ronaldo (Note: Ronaldo was signed by Inter Milan from Barcelona midway through 1997.)	(Italy) Inter Milan	480
1997	2nd	(Brazil) Roberto Carlos	(Spain) Real Madrid	85
1997	3rd	(Netherlands) Dennis Bergkamp	(England) Arsenal	62
1997	3rd	(France) Zinedine Zidane	(Italy) Juventus	62
1998	1st	(France) Zinedine Zidane	(Italy) Juventus	518
1998	2nd	(Brazil) Ronaldo	(Italy) Inter Milan	164
1998	3rd	(Croatia) Davor Šuker	(Spain) Real Madrid	108
1999	1st	(Brazil) Rivaldo	(Spain) Barcelona	543
1999	2nd	(England) David Beckham	(England) Manchester United	194
1999	3rd	(Argentina) Gabriel Batistuta	(Italy) Fiorentina	79
2000	1st	(France) Zinedine Zidane	(Italy) Juventus	370
2000	2nd	(Portugal) Luís Figo (Note: Figo was signed by Real Madrid from Barcelona midway through 2000.)	(Spain) Real Madrid	329
2000	3rd	(Brazil) Rivaldo	(Spain) Barcelona	263
2001	1st	(Portugal) Luís Figo	(Spain) Real Madrid	250
2001	2nd	(England) David Beckham	(England) Manchester United	238
2001	3rd	(Spain) Raúl	(Spain) Real Madrid	96
2002	1st	(Brazil) Ronaldo (Note: Ronaldo was signed by Real Madrid from Inter Milan midway through 2002.)	(Spain) Real Madrid	387
2002	2nd	(Germany) Oliver Kahn	(Germany) Bayern Munich	171
2002	3rd	(France) Zinedine Zidane	(Spain) Real Madrid	148
2003	1st	(France) Zinedine Zidane	(Spain) Real Madrid	264
2003	2nd	(France) Thierry Henry	(England) Arsenal	200
2003	3rd	(Brazil) Ronaldo	(Spain) Real Madrid	176
2004	1st	(Brazil) Ronaldinho	(Spain) Barcelona	620
2004	2nd	(France) Thierry Henry	(England) Arsenal	552
2004	3rd	(Ukraine) Andriy Shevchenko	(Italy) Milan	253
2005	1st	(Brazil) Ronaldinho	(Spain) Barcelona	956
2005	2nd	(England) Frank Lampard	(England) Chelsea	306
2005	3rd	(Cameroon) Samuel Eto'o	(Spain) Barcelona	190
2006	1st	(Italy) Fabio Cannavaro (Note: Cannavaro was signed by Real Madrid from Juventus midway through 2006.)	(Spain) Real Madrid	498
2006	2nd	(France) Zinedine Zidane	(Spain) Real Madrid	454
2006	3rd	(Brazil) Ronaldinho	(Spain) Barcelona	380
2007	1st	(Brazil) Kaká	(Italy) Milan	1,047
2007	2nd	(Argentina) Lionel Messi	(Spain) Barcelona	504
2007	3rd	(Portugal) Cristiano Ronaldo	(England) Manchester United	426
2008	1st	(Portugal) Cristiano Ronaldo	(England) Manchester United	935
2008	2nd	(Argentina) Lionel Messi	(Spain) Barcelona	678
2008	3rd	(Spain) Fernando Torres	(England) Liverpool	203
2009	1st	(Argentina) Lionel Messi	(Spain) Barcelona	1,073
2009	2nd	(Portugal) Cristiano Ronaldo (Note: Cristiano Ronaldo was signed by Real Madrid from Manchester United midway through 2009.)	(Spain) Real Madrid	352
2009	3rd	(Spain) Xavi	(Spain) Barcelona	196

From 2010 to 2015, the award was merged with the Ballon d'Or to become the FIFA Ballon d'Or in a six-year partnership with France Football. In 2016, FIFA rebranded the award as The Best FIFA Men's Player.

A single article from the Portuguese daily newspaper A Bola reporting about the 1992 award mentions the former award winners Lothar Matthäus in 1991, but also Diego Maradona in 1990. There is no other evidence of the award being presented by FIFA prior to 1991.

=== Wins by player ===
Player	Winner	Runner-up	Third place
(France) Zinedine Zidane	3 (1998, 2000, 2003)	1 (2006)	2 (1997, 2002)
(Brazil) Ronaldo	3 (1996, 1997, 2002)	1 (1998)	1 (2003)
(Brazil) Ronaldinho	2 (2004, 2005)	—	1 (2006)
(Argentina) Lionel Messi	1 (2009)	2 (2007, 2008)	—
(Portugal) Cristiano Ronaldo	1 (2008)	1 (2009)	1 (2007)
(Brazil) Romário	1 (1994)	1 (1993)	—
(Liberia) George Weah	1 (1995)	1 (1996)	—
(Portugal) Luís Figo	1 (2001)	1 (2000)	—
(Italy) Roberto Baggio	1 (1993)	—	1 (1994)
(Brazil) Rivaldo	1 (1999)	—	1 (2000)
(Germany) Lothar Matthäus	1 (1991)	—	—
(Netherlands) Marco van Basten	1 (1992)	—	—
(Italy) Fabio Cannavaro	1 (2006)	—	—
(Brazil) Kaká	1 (2007)	—	—

=== Wins by country ===
Country	Players	Total
Brazil	5	8
Italy	2	2
Portugal	2	2
France	1	3
Germany	1	1
Netherlands	1	1
Liberia	1	1
Argentina	1	1

=== Wins by club ===
Club	Players	Total
(Spain) Barcelona	5	6
(Spain) Real Madrid	4	4
(Italy) Milan	3	3
(Italy) Juventus	2	3
(Italy) Inter Milan	2	2
(England) Manchester United	1	1

== FIFA Women's World Player of the Year ==
Year	Rank	Player	Team	Points
2001	1st	(United States) Mia Hamm	(United States) Washington Freedom	154
2001	2nd	(China) Sun Wen	(United States) Atlanta Beat	79
2001	3rd	(United States) Tiffeny Milbrett	(United States) New York Power	47
2002	1st	(United States) Mia Hamm	(United States) Washington Freedom	161
2002	2nd	(Germany) Birgit Prinz	(Germany) 1. FFC Frankfurt (United States) Carolina Courage	96
2002	3rd	(China) Sun Wen	(United States) Atlanta Beat (China) Shanghai SVA	58
2003	1st	(Germany) Birgit Prinz	(United States) Carolina Courage (Germany) 1. FFC Frankfurt	268
2003	2nd	(United States) Mia Hamm	(United States) Washington Freedom	133
2003	3rd	(Sweden) Hanna Ljungberg	(Sweden) Umeå IK	84
2004	1st	(Germany) Birgit Prinz	(Germany) 1. FFC Frankfurt	376
2004	2nd	(United States) Mia Hamm	(United States) Washington Freedom	286
2004	3rd	(Brazil) Marta	(Brazil) Santa Cruz (Sweden) Umeå IK	281
2005	1st	(Germany) Birgit Prinz	(Germany) 1. FFC Frankfurt	513
2005	2nd	(Brazil) Marta	(Sweden) Umeå IK	429
2005	3rd	(United States) Shannon Boxx	(United States) Ajax America Women	235
2006	1st	(Brazil) Marta	(Sweden) Umeå IK	475
2006	2nd	(United States) Kristine Lilly	(Sweden) KIF Örebro DFF	388
2006	3rd	(Germany) Renate Lingor	(Germany) 1. FFC Frankfurt	305
2007	1st	(Brazil) Marta	(Sweden) Umeå IK	988
2007	2nd	(Germany) Birgit Prinz	(Germany) 1. FFC Frankfurt	507
2007	3rd	(Brazil) Cristiane	(Germany) VfL Wolfsburg	150
2008	1st	(Brazil) Marta	(Sweden) Umeå IK	1,002
2008	2nd	(Germany) Birgit Prinz	(Germany) 1. FFC Frankfurt	328
2008	3rd	(Brazil) Cristiane (Note: Cristiane was signed by Corinthians from Linköpings F.C. midway through 2008.)	(Brazil) Corinthians	275
2009	1st	(Brazil) Marta (Note: Marta was signed by Santos from Los Angeles Sol midway through 2009.)	(Brazil) Santos	833
2009	2nd	(Germany) Birgit Prinz	(Germany) 1. FFC Frankfurt	290
2009	3rd	(England) Kelly Smith (Note: Smith was signed by Boston Breakers from Arsenal Ladies midway through 2009.)	(United States) Boston Breakers	252
2010	1st	(Brazil) Marta	(United States) FC Gold Pride	38.20%
2010	2nd	(Germany) Birgit Prinz	(Germany) 1. FFC Frankfurt	15.18%
2010	3rd	(Germany) Fatmire Bajramaj	(Germany) 1. FFC Turbine Potsdam	9.96%
2011	1st	(Japan) Homare Sawa	(Japan) INAC Kobe Leonessa	28.51%
2011	2nd	(Brazil) Marta (Note: Marta was signed by Western New York Flash from Santos midway through 2011.)	(United States) Western New York Flash	17.28%
2011	3rd	(United States) Abby Wambach	(United States) magicJack	13.26%
2012	1st	(United States) Abby Wambach	Unattached	20.67%
2012	2nd	(Brazil) Marta	(Sweden) Tyresö FF	13.50%
2012	3rd	(United States) Alex Morgan	(United States) Seattle Sounders	10.87%
2013	1st	(Germany) Nadine Angerer (Note: Angerer was signed by Brisbane Roar from 1. FFC Frankfurt midway through 2013.)	(Australia) Brisbane Roar	18.85%
2013	2nd	(United States) Abby Wambach	(United States) Western New York Flash	15.02%
2013	3rd	(Brazil) Marta	(Sweden) Tyresö FF	14.02%
2014	1st	(Germany) Nadine Keßler	(Germany) VfL Wolfsburg	17.52%
2014	2nd	(Brazil) Marta (Note: Marta was signed by FC Rosengård from Tyresö FF midway through 2014.)	(Sweden) FC Rosengård	14.16%
2014	3rd	(United States) Abby Wambach	(United States) Western New York Flash	13.33%
2015	1st	(United States) Carli Lloyd	(United States) Houston Dash	35.28%
2015	2nd	(Germany) Célia Šašić	(Germany) 1. FFC Frankfurt	12.60%
2015	3rd	(Japan) Aya Miyama	(Japan) Okayama Yunogo Belle	9.88%

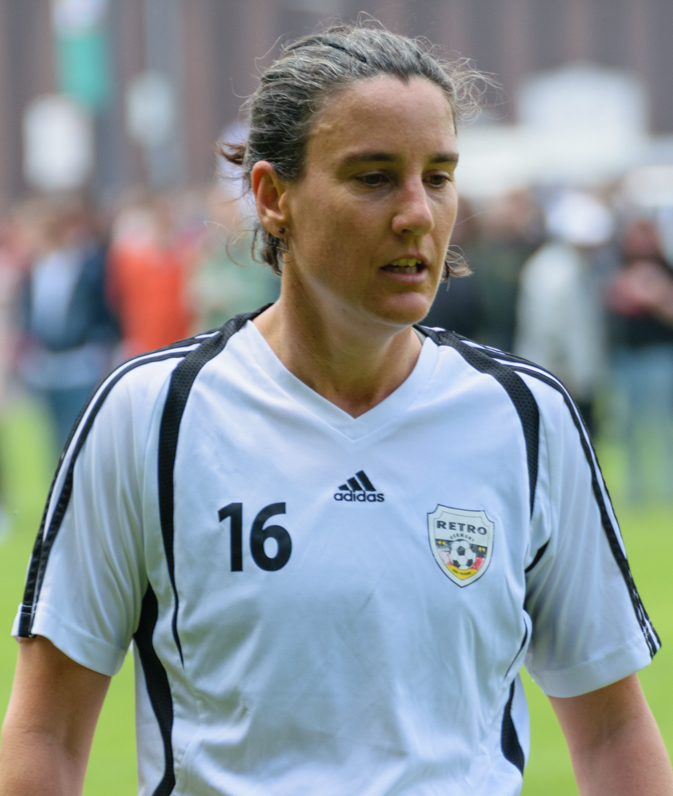
Birgit Prinz won the award three times.

In 2016, FIFA created The Best FIFA Women's Player award instead.

=== Wins by player ===
Player	1st	2nd	3rd
(Brazil) Marta	5 (2006, 2007, 2008, 2009, 2010)	4 (2005, 2011, 2012, 2014)	2 (2004, 2013)
(Germany) Birgit Prinz	3 (2003, 2004, 2005)	5 (2002, 2007, 2008, 2009, 2010)	—
(United States) Mia Hamm	2 (2001, 2002)	2 (2003, 2004)	—
(United States) Abby Wambach	1 (2012)	1 (2013)	2 (2011, 2014)
(Japan) Homare Sawa	1 (2011)	—	—
(Germany) Nadine Angerer	1 (2013)	—	—
(Germany) Nadine Keßler	1 (2014)	—	—
(United States) Carli Lloyd	1 (2015)	—	—

=== Wins by country ===
Country	Players	Total
Germany	3	5
Brazil	1	5
United States	3	4
Japan	1	1

=== Wins by club ===
Club	Players	Total
(Germany) 1. FFC Frankfurt	1	3
(Sweden) Umeå IK	1	3
(United States) Washington Freedom	1	2
(Brazil) Santos	1	1
(Japan) INAC Kobe Leonessa	1	1
(Australia) Brisbane Roar	1	1
(Germany) VfL Wolfsburg	1	1
(United States) Houston Dash	1	1

== See also ==
- List of sports awards honoring women
- Ballon d'Or
- FIFA Ballon d'Or
- The Best FIFA Football Awards
- FIFPRO World 11
