= International Football Hall of Champions =

FIFA's hall of fame for professional footballers

- Established: 1998
- Founder: ISEC, FIFA
- Inductees: 21

The International Football Hall of Fame, also known by its acronym as IFHOC or Hall of Champions, was FIFA's hall of fame for professional footballers from all over the world. It was established as the only official FIFA-recognized hall of fame to the world football in 1998. The Hall of Champions was conceived by the International Sports and Entertainment Concepts (ISEC) in Atlanta and the awards were presented at the FIFA World Player of the Year Gala, annually. The eligibility for the Hall of Champions was based on both sporting success and a consistent contribution to the positive image of football.

Its last induction was 2001. Afterwards it has been abandoned. Altogether 21 players, 12 coaches/administrators and seven football teams were honoured (excluding Tele Santana and Boca Juniors, who were meant to be awarded in 2002).

== Background ==
FIFA already announced in 1997 the launch of its own hall of fame to be hosted in London. The International Sports and Entertainment Concepts would sponsor the hall of fame with the mission to create a football experience and present a tribute to the history of football.

However, a few months later on 27 November 1997 a newly founded organisation, the International Football Hall of Fame by the PFA also announced its 25 first inductees and the plans for a museum to be built in Manchester.

== History ==
The International Football Hall of Champions was finally launched at FIFA's annual awards gala on 12 January 1998 in Paris, when the first 10 players were inducted. Another five were inducted at the 1999 awards gala, and a further four in the 2000 awards gala.

In January 2000, news reports indicated that plans to locate the Museum of the Hall of Champions in Paris had fallen through and negotiations were underway to move it to London. Then the Hall of Champions disappeared from the news, and its official website was no longer updated after a posting stating that Italy's Giuseppe Meazza and Uruguay's José Leandro Andrade were the last inductees in 2001.

The press releases and news stories on the FIFA awards ceremony of January 2001, unlike those of previous years, did not carry anything about the Hall of Champions. Although FIFA officially backed the Hall of Champions over its first three years, apparently the project had fallen into its disfavour. Again there were no press releases or news about Hall of Champions selections in 2002, and the FIFA awards dinner of January 2002 also came and went without mention of it.

It became clear that the Hall of Champions has been abandoned altogether when FIFA's executive committee announced that at its meeting of 9 March 2002 "The Spanish Football Federation was asked to pursue a project on FIFA's behalf for the establishment of a new International Football Hall of Fame in Valencia." And on 26 May 2002, FIFA revealed that its Executive Committee had decided that "the site of the FIFA Hall of Fame will be in Valencia, Spain" with a planned inauguration of November 2004. The Hall of Fame would be run as a joint venture by FIFA, the Spanish Football Association and the Province of Valencia, and FIFA will not bear any of the costs.

For reasons not explained, the Hall of Champions became defunct after three induction ceremonies. In total 21 players were honoured, including the two scheduled to be inducted at the aborted 2001 ceremony.

=== Class of 1998 ===
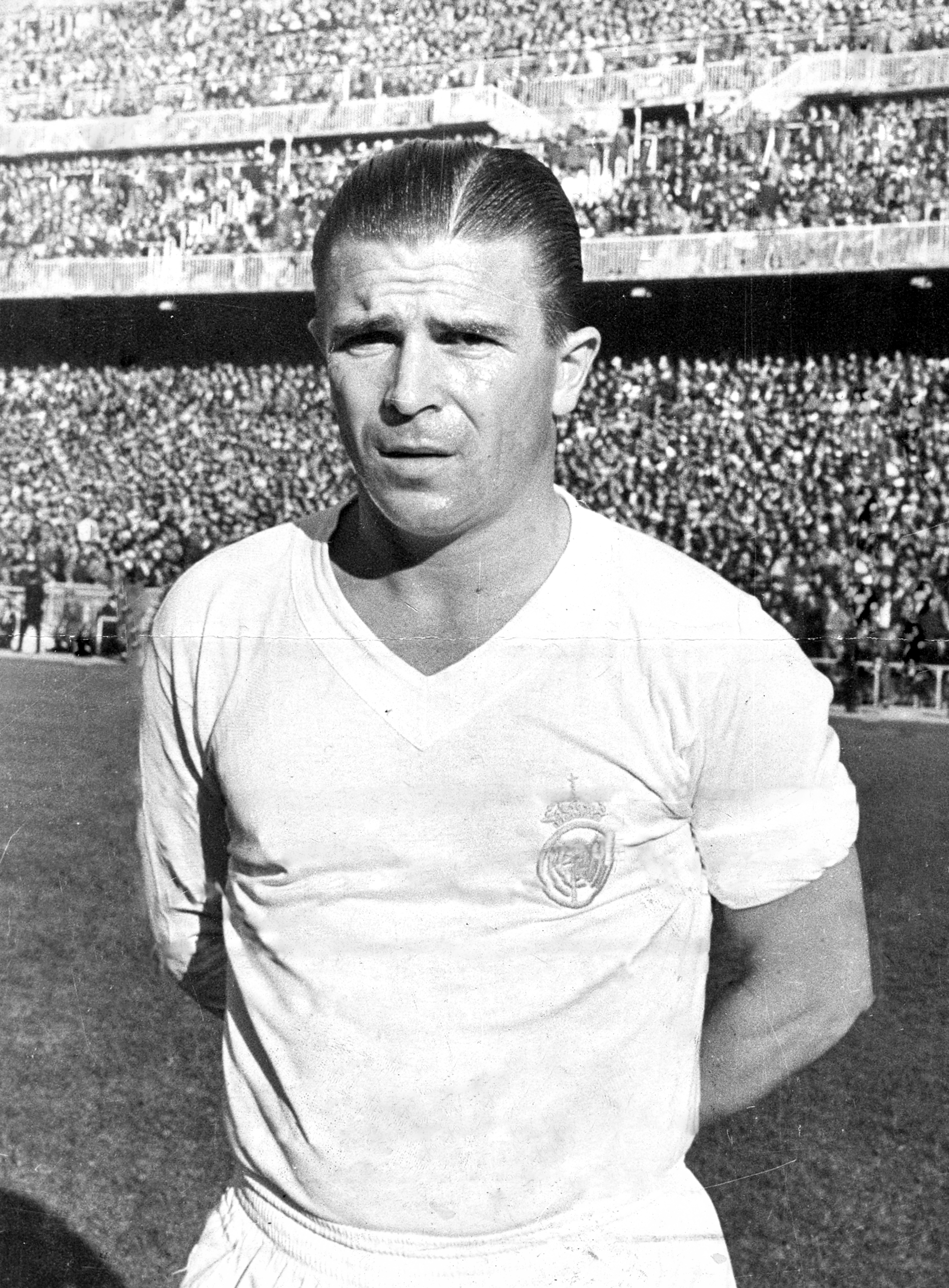
Ferenc Puskás, one of the first 10 inductees in 1998.

The first class of inductees took place on 12 January 1998, at Disneyland in Paris and it was met with great success. Ten legendary footballers who had retired for at least five years prior to the event were inducted.

=== Class of 1999 ===
This time the 1999 ceremony continued the tradition of honoring its inductees during the 1999 FIFA World Player Gala in Barcelona. For the second year in a row, the Hall of Champions shared the spotlight as the biggest football celebrities gathered together to recognize the best achievements and personalities in world football. Five more players were inducted on 1 February 1999. Johan Cruyff and Franz Beckenbauer, already hall of famers, presented the five newly inducted footballers at the gala.

=== Class of 2000 ===
During the 2000 Induction Ceremony on 24 January, Didi, Zico, Marco Van Basten and George Best were inducted, accepting their induction award from Michel Platini and João Havelange. These four players were chosen by a panel of 26 international soccer journalists. Barcelona FC and Italy national team were also elected.

The ceremony took place at the Palais des Congrès in Brussels and included several awards presented by Foot Magazine.

=== Class of 2001 ===
Meazza and Andrande, alongside coach Vittorio Pozzo were officially inducted into the Hall of Champions on 11 December 2000. However, the cermenony in early 2000 never took place.

=== Class of 2002 ===
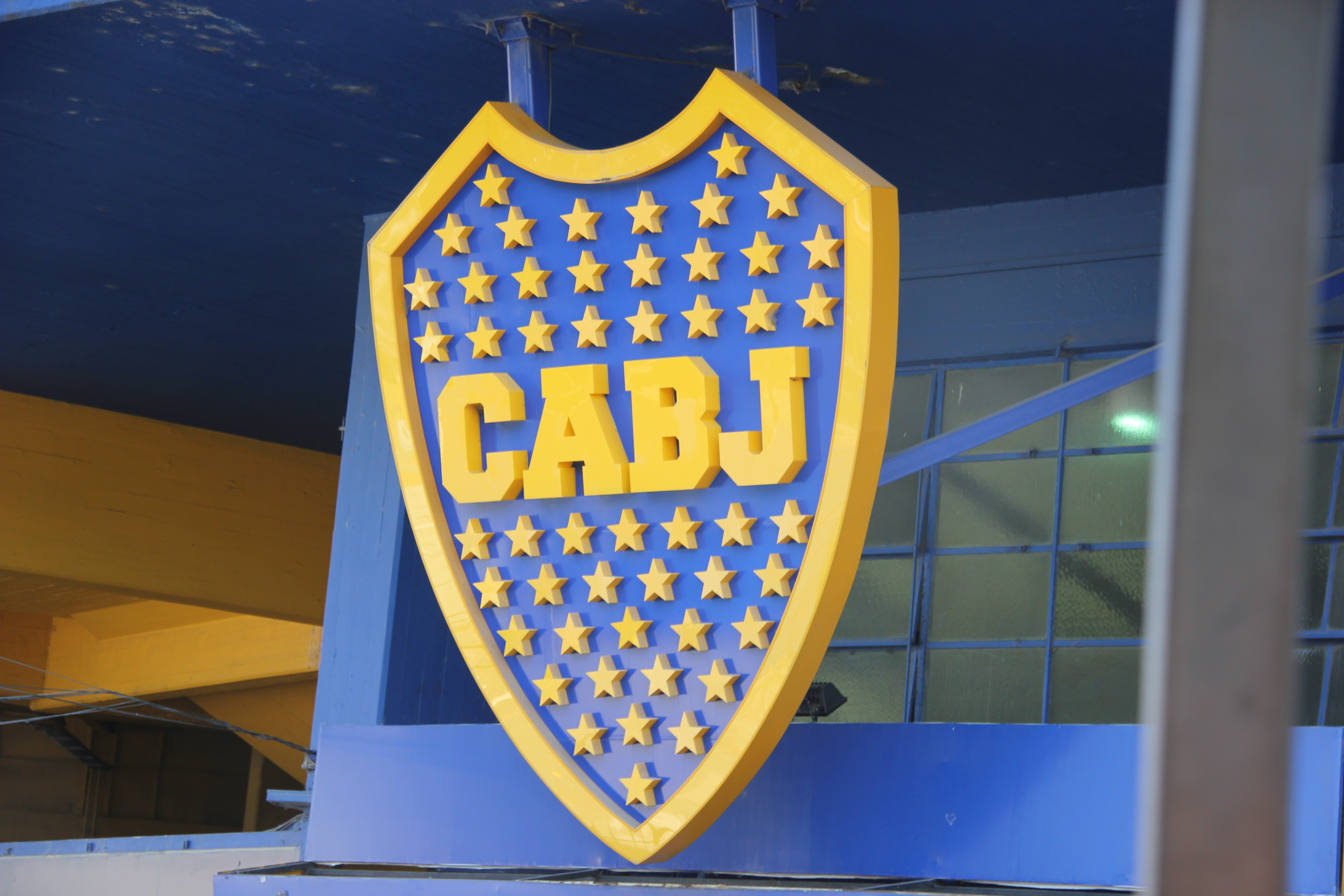
Boca Juniors, was elected for the Class of 2002.

Boca Juniors was elected as the new club at the xpense of Manchester United with 33% over 30% at the poll. Candidate coaches were: Ernst Happel, Sepp Herberger, Tele Santana, Helmut Schön and Jock Stein. Santana won the ballot with 47%. Diego Maradona's goal against England in the 1986 World Cup was voted as the fans' favourite.

Gabriel Batistuta was also voted (25%) as the active player more likely to enter the Hall of Fame after retiring. Zinedine Zidane came second with 20% and Rivaldo third with 19%. The ceremony again was not held.

== Criteria ==
According to a statement appearing on the official Hall of Champions website: "The Hall of Champions will celebrate the lives and careers of the great figures of football. Through its inductees, the Hall will promote not only the values of excellence and achievement, but also those of sportsmanship and fairplay. Eligibility for the Hall of Champions is based on both sporting success and a consistent contribution to the positive image of the game of football. To select the inductees, the Hall of Champions has drawn on the knowledge of a panel of esteemed football journalists from around the world."

The Rules for Eligibility and Election to the Hall of Champions according to its website were as below:

- Candidates must have completed a minimum of 10 years of active participation in international competition play and been retired from active play for a minimum of five calendar years.
- Candidates must have maintained a high level of sportsmanship, character, public morals, conduct and integrity, free from conviction of any criminal activity and/or guilt of misconduct both on and off the field detrimental to the positive image and integrity of football.
- In the event of disciplinary action in the form of long-term ban or suspension having been imposed by any national or international governing body, the approval of FIFA, and the applicable Confederation(s) and National Federation(s) in each country where the transgression(s) or infraction(s) occurred, must be granted in writing to the Steering Committee of the IFHOC before the eligibility for nomination will be granted.

== Inductees (1998–2001) ==
=== Players ===
A total of 10 players were inaugural inductees in 1998. The votes were not announced, but the IFHOC placed the players in the following order on its release statement (they were then listed alphabetically in future statements):

Year	Inductee	Nationality	Position	Gender	NT Career (Note: The years of the player's first and last appearance for a national team.)	Caps and goals
1998	Franz Beckenbauer	Germany	Forward	Man	1965–1977	West German: 103 caps, 14 goals
1998	Stanley Matthews	England	Forward	Man	1934–1957	England: 54 caps, 11 goals
1998	Bobby Charlton	England	Forward	Man	1958–1970	England: 106 caps, 49 goals
1998	Pele	BRA	Midfielder; Forward	Man	1957–1971	Brazil: 92 caps, 77 goals
1998	Johan Cruyff	Netherlands	Forward	Man	1966–1977	Netherlands: 48 caps, 33 goals
1998	Michel Platini	France	Midfielder	Man	1976–1987	France: 72 caps, 41 goals
1998	Alfredo Di Stefano	Argentina Spain	Forward	Man	1947–1961	Argentina: 8 caps, 6 goals, and Spain: 31 caps, 23 goals
1998	Ferenc Puskas	Hungary Spain	Forward	Man	1945–1962	Hungary: 84 caps, 83 goals, and Spain: 4 caps, 0 goals
1998	Eusébio	Portugal	Forward	Man	1961–1973	Portugal: 64 caps, 41 goals
1998	Lev Yashin	Soviet Union	Goalkeeper	Man	1954–1967	Soviet Union: 79 caps, ? goals against
Year	Inductee	Nationality	Position	Gender	NT Career	Caps and goals
1999	Just Fontaine	France	Forward	Man	1953–1960	France: 21 caps, 30 goals
1999	Gerd Muller	GER	Forward	Man	1966–1974	West Germany: 62 caps, 68 goals
1999	Bobby Moore	England	Defender	Man	1962–1973	England: 108 caps, 2 goals
1999	Dino Zoff	Italy	Goalkeeper	Man	1968–1983	Italy: 112 caps, 91 goals against
Year	Inductee	Nationality	Position	Gender	NT Career	Caps and goals
2000	George Best	Northern Ireland	Forward	Man	1964–1977	Northern Ireland: 37 caps, 9 goals
2000	Didi	BRA	Midfielder; Forward	Man	1952–1962	Brazil: 68 caps, 20 goals
2000	Zico	Brazil	Midfielder	Man	1971–1989	Brazil: 71 caps, 48 goals
2000	Marco Van Basten	Netherlands	Forward	Man	1983–1992	Netherlands: 58 caps, 24 goals
Year	Inductee	Nationality	Position	Gender	NT Career	Caps and goals
2001	José Leandro Andrade	Uruguay	Midfielder	Man	1923–1930	Uruguay: 33 caps, 1 goal
2001	Giuseppe Meazza	Italy	Forward	Man	1930–1949	Italy: 53 caps, 33 goals

=== Future Hall of Famers ===
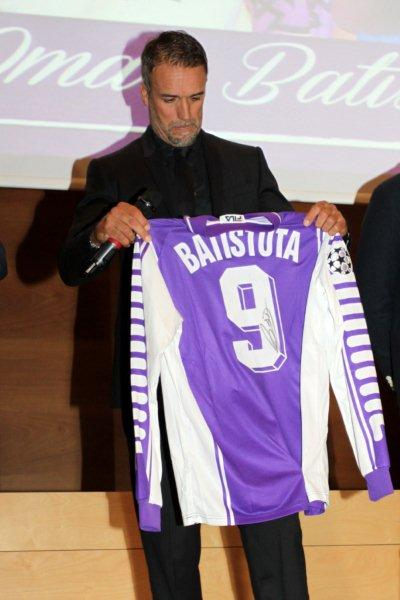
Gabriel Batistuta was guaranteed a place in an upcoming class, after retiring from football.

In 2001 Gabriel Batistuta and Mia Hamm were voted as future hall of famers while active. (Note: Batistuta received 25% of votes, Zidane 20%, Rivaldo 19%, Luis Figo 13%, Lothar Matthaus 10%, David Beckham 8% and Raul 5%. For the women Mia Hamm received 56%.)

Player	Nationality	Position	Gender
Gabriel Batistuta	ARG	Forward	Man
Mia Hamm	USA	Forward	Woman

=== Coaches ===
Two coaches were inaugural inductees in 1998. The votes were not announced, but the IFHOC placed the 1998 coaches in the following order:

Year	Inductee	Nationality	Position as player	Gender	Coaching Career (Note: The years of the coach's first and last appearance for a professional club or national team.)	NT Coaching Career
1998	Rinus Michels	NED	Forward	Man	1953–1992	Hollnad: 1974, 1984–85, 1990–92
1998	Matt Busby	SCO	Midfielder	Man	1945–1971	Great Britain: 1948, Scotland: 1958
2001	Vittorio Pozzo	ITA	Midfielder	Man	1912–1948	Italy: 1912, 1921, 1924, 1929–1948
2002	Tele Santana (Note: Ernst Happel 12%, Sepp Herberger 15%, Tele Santana 47%, Helmut Schön 12%, Jock Stein 14%.)	BRA	Midfielder	Man	1969–1996	Brazil: 1980–82, 1985–86

=== Clubs ===
Year	Inductee	Nationality	Gender	Active since	World Honours (Note: Until the year of unduction.)
1998	Real Madrid CF	ESP	Man	1900–present	Intercontinental Cup (1960)
1999	AFC Ajax	NED	Man	1900–present	Intercontinental Cup (1972, 1985)
2000	FC Barcelona	ESP	Man	1899–present	None
2002	Boca Juniors (Note: Votes: Boca Juniors 33% Manchester United 30% Juventus 22% Bayern Munich 15%.)	ARG	Man	1905–present	Intercontinental Cup (1977, 2000)

=== National teams ===
Year	Inductee	Nationality	Gender	Active since	World Honours (Note: Until the year of unduction.)
1998	Brazil	BRA	Man	1914–present	FIFA World Cup (1958, 1962, 1970, 1994), FIFA Confederations Cup (1997), Olympics (1984, 1988–2nd)
1999	Germany	GER	Man	1899–present	FIFA World Cup (1954, 1974, 1990), Olympics (1988-3d)
2000	Italy	ITA	Man	1899–present	FIFA World Cup (1934, 1938, 1982), Olympics (1936, 1928-3d)
2001	Argentina	ARG	Man	1899–present	FIFA World Cup (1978, 1986), FIFA Confederations Cup (1992), Olympics (1928–2nd)

=== Best matches ===
ISEC and FIFA also selected the most memorable matches in history for induction to the Hall of Fame, via a fans' poll.

Year	Match	Nationality	Gender	Competition
2001	Germany vs France	GER, FRA	Man	1982 FIFA World Cup semi-final

=== Best goals ===
ISEC and FIFA also selected the most beautiful goals in history for induction to the Hall of Fame, via a fans' poll.

Year	Match	Nationality	Scorer	Competition
2002	England vs Argentina	ENG, ARG	Diego Maradona	1986 FIFA World Cup quarterfinal

== Selectors ==
There were 27 selectors, most of them football experts and journalists. The publication they worked for at the time is in brackets:

- Francesco Aguilar Arias Spain (Web Site: www.elmundodeportivo.es)
- John Baete Belgium (Foot Magazine)
- Sergio Di Cesare Italy (Web Site: www.gazetta.it)
- Christian Charcossey France (Web Site: www.afp.com)
- Denis Chaumier France (L'Equipe)
- Peter Christoph Switzerland (Web Site: www.sport-online.ch)
- Cees Van Cuilenborg Netherlands (Web Site: www.vi.nl)
- Gerard Ernault France (France Football)
- Jose Carlos Freitas Portugal (Web Site: www.a-bola.pt)
- Paul Gardner United States (Web Site: www.socceramerica.com)
- Mark Gleeson South Africa (Web site: kickoff.24.com)
- Gerd Graus Germany (SID)
- Jaap de Groot Netherlands (Web Site: www.telegraaf.nl)
- Hedi Hamel France (Afrique Football)
- Per Hoyer Hansen Denmark (Tips-Bladet)
- Jan Hansson Sweden (Web Site: www.gp.se)
- Rainier Holzschuh Germany (Web Site: www.kicker.de)
- Jerry Langdon United States (Web Site: www.usatoday.com)
- Emmanuel Maradas England (Web Site: www.sportscheduler.co.sz)
- Juan Pedro Martínez Spain (Web Site: www.donbalon.es)
- Franklin Morales Uruguay (TV "Estadio Uno", Semanano "Tres")
- Les Murray Australia (SBS Australia)
- Alfredo T. Ogawa Brazil (Web Site: www.placar.com.br)
- Yoshiyuki Osumii Japan
- Keir Radnedge England (World Sport Service)
- Martin Tyler England (Web Site: www.skysports.co.uk)
- Tom West United States (Web Site: www.cnnsi.com)

== The Museum ==
ISEC planned to build the Hall of Champions museum in London. After the International Hall of Fame was announced, ISEC and FIFA explored the option of Paris, but their attempt was again not met with success.

In 2002 five days before the start of the World Cup, FIFA announced plans to open its own FIFA Hall of Fame in Valencia, Spain with a planned inauguration of November 2004. It was an announcement that separated FIFA's future from ISEC's awards. The hall would be built and run as a joint venture between FIFA, Spain's football federation and the municipality of Valencia. The museum was never built.

== Aftermath ==
A decade after the Class of 2001, the creation of the Salón De La Fama Del Futbol Internacional was announced in Pachuca, the birthplace of Mexican football. The Hall of Fame would be hosted in a newly built museum. In June 2011 the first players were inducted (Mexican and international) and ever since it has been the only hall of fame sanctioned by FIFA. The most recent class was in 2024.

== See also ==
- FIFA World Cup awards
- Soccer Hall of Fame
- International Football Hall of Fame

== Sources ==
- Past inductions (Photos)
- Induction Ceremonies
