= The Best FIFA Player =

The Best FIFA Player may refer to:

- The Best FIFA Men's Player
- The Best FIFA Women's Player
