= 2010 FIFA Ballon d'Or =

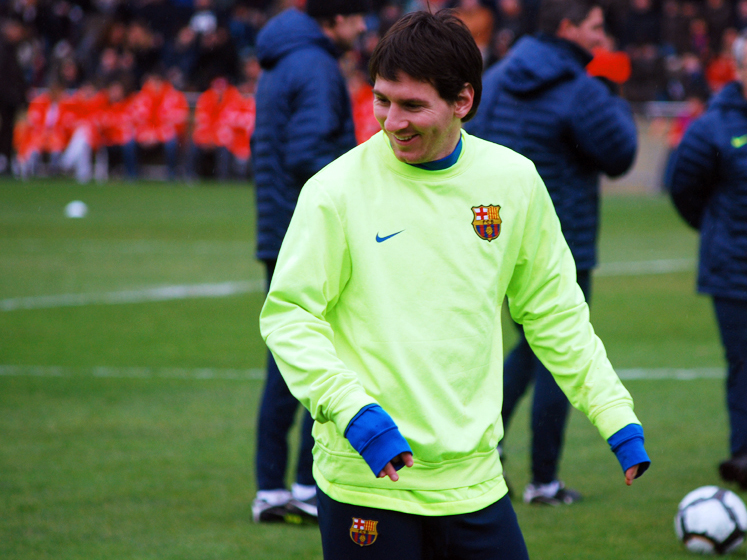
- 2010 FIFA Ballon d'Or winner, Lionel Messi
- Date: 10 January 2011
- Location: Zürich, Switzerland
- Country: Switzerland
- Presented by: FIFA

Highlights
- Won by: (Argentina) Lionel Messi (2nd Ballon d'Or)
- Website: ballondor.com

The 2010 FIFA Ballon d'Or (lit. '2010 FIFA Golden Ball'), was the inaugural year for FIFA's awards for the top football players and coaches of the year. The gala is a continuation of the FIFA World Player Gala and a result of merging the FIFA Men's World Player of the Year award with the Ballon d'Or, created and presented by France Football to the top men's player in Europe since 1956. The awards ceremony took place on 10 January 2011 in Zürich, Switzerland. The three finalists for each category were announced on 6 December 2010.

La Masia, the FC Barcelona academy, achieved a record breaking honor in becoming the first youth academy ever to have all three finalists for the Ballon d'Or in one same year, with Lionel Messi, Andrés Iniesta and Xavi. Messi won the award, his second consecutive Ballon d'Or victory.

Marta won the FIFA Women's World Player of the Year award, her fifth in a row.

José Mourinho, Portuguese manager of Real Madrid and previously of Internazionale, was the first winner of the men's FIFA World Coach of the Year award in 2010. The women's version of the award was won by Germany head coach Silvia Neid.

== Winners and nominees ==
=== FIFA Ballon d'Or ===
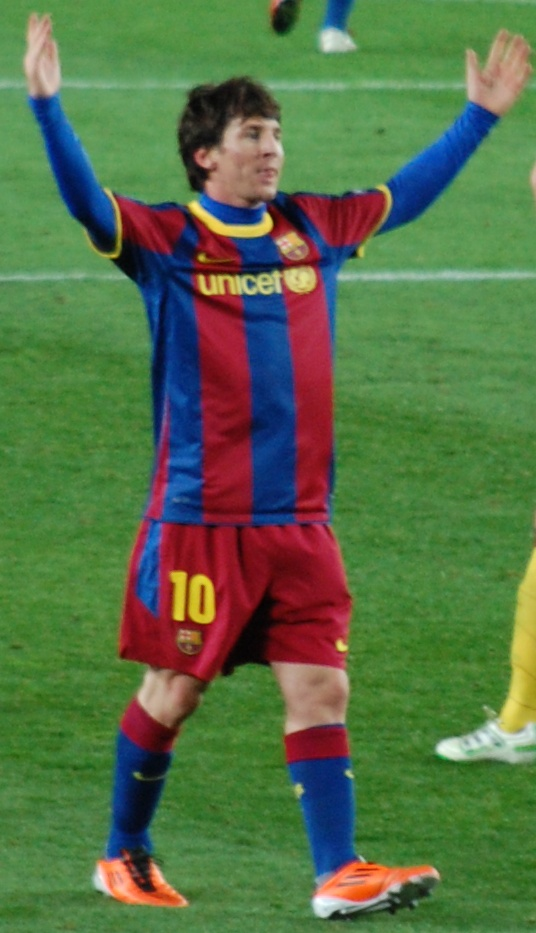
Lionel Messi

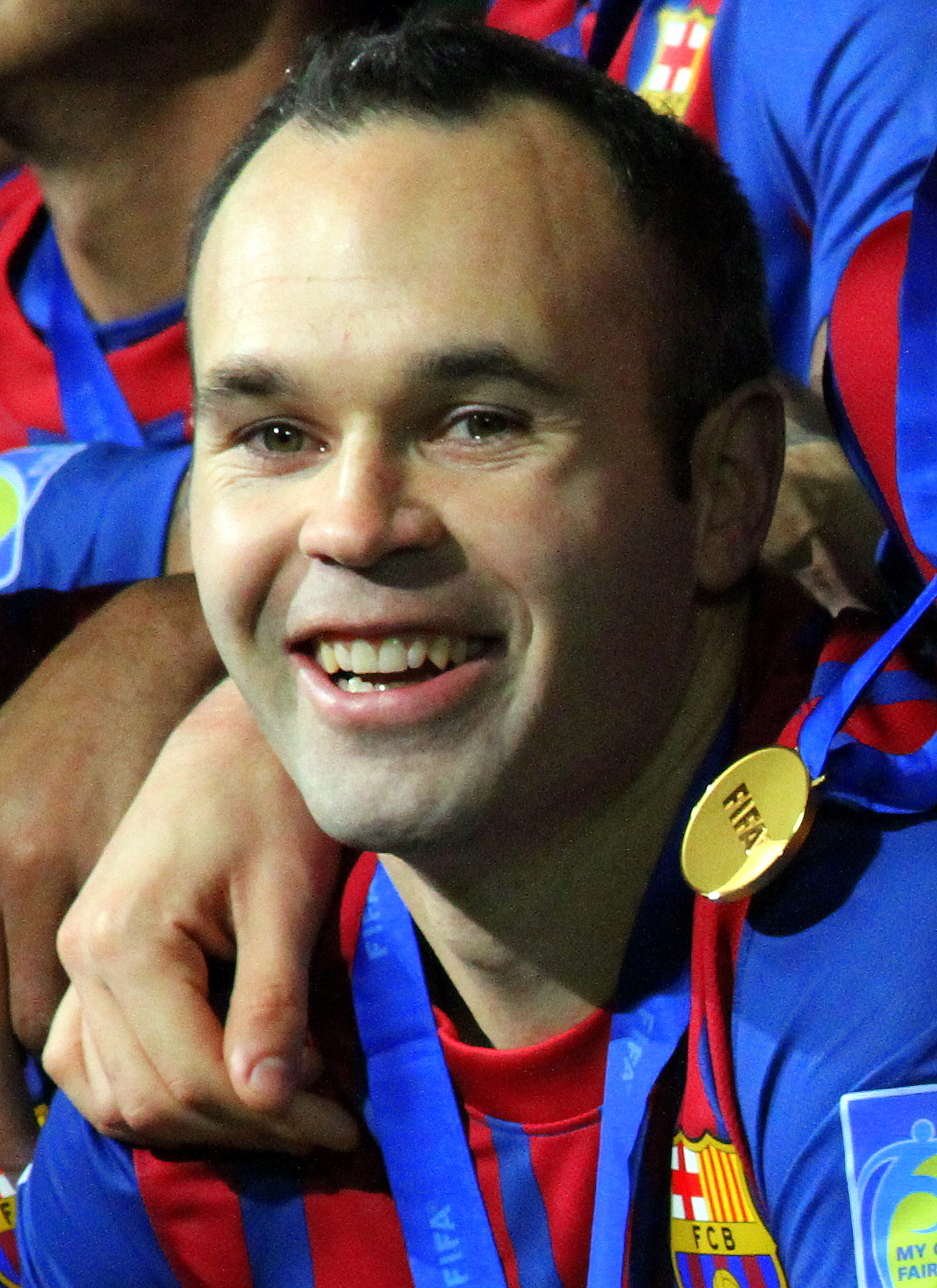
Andrés Iniesta

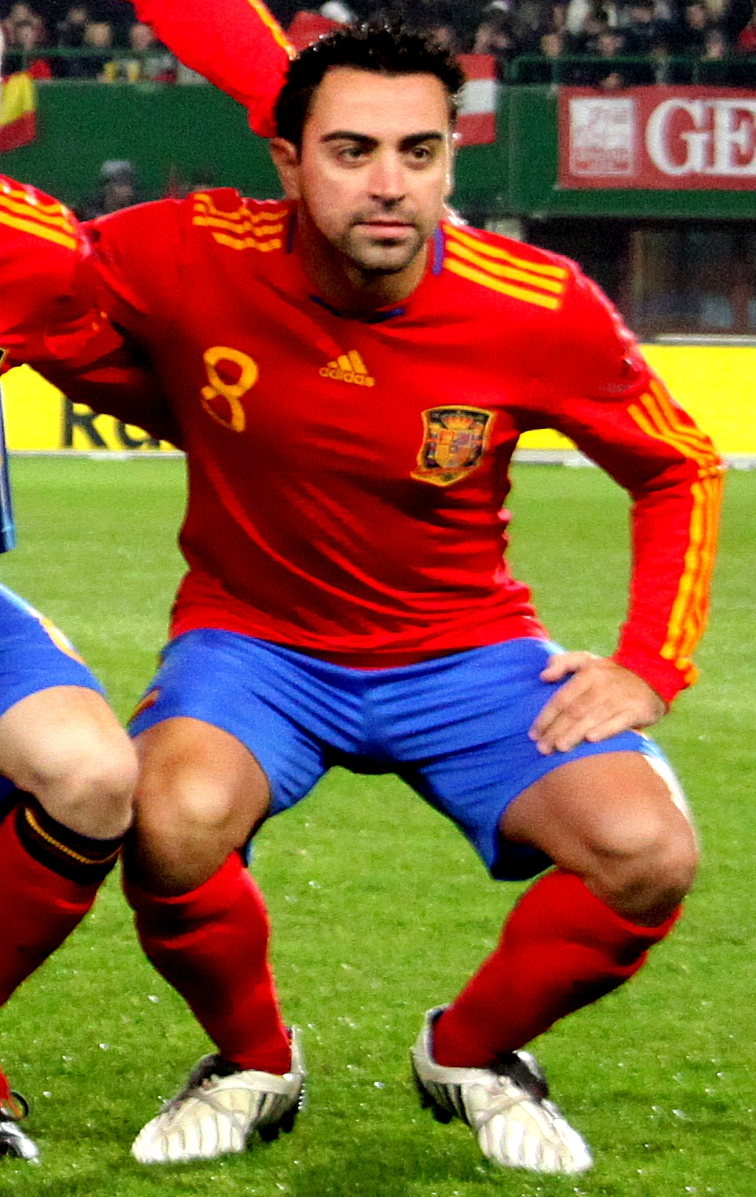
Xavi

Rank	Player	National team	Club(s)	Percent
1st	Lionel Messi	Argentina	(Spain) Barcelona	22.65%
2nd	Andrés Iniesta	Spain	(Spain) Barcelona	17.36%
3rd	Xavi	Spain	(Spain) Barcelona	16.48%

The following twenty players were also in contention for the award:

Rank	Player	National team	Club(s)	Percent
4th	Wesley Sneijder	Netherlands	(Italy) Internazionale	14.48%
5th	Diego Forlán	Uruguay	(Spain) Atlético Madrid	7.61%
6th	Cristiano Ronaldo	Portugal	(Spain) Real Madrid	3.92%
7th	Iker Casillas	Spain	(Spain) Real Madrid	2.90%
8th	David Villa	Spain	(Spain) Valencia (Spain) Barcelona	2.25%
9th	Didier Drogba	Ivory Coast	(England) Chelsea	1.68%
10th	Xabi Alonso	Spain	(Spain) Real Madrid	1.52%
11th	Carles Puyol	Spain	(Spain) Barcelona	1.43%
12th	Samuel Eto'o	Cameroon	(Italy) Internazionale	1.37%
13th	Mesut Özil	Germany	(Spain) Real Madrid	1.21%
14th	Arjen Robben	Netherlands	(Germany) Bayern Munich	1.16%
15th	Thomas Müller	Germany	(Germany) Bayern Munich	0.91%
16th	Bastian Schweinsteiger	Germany	(Germany) Bayern Munich	0.75%
17th	Maicon	Brazil	(Italy) Internazionale	0.57%
18th	Asamoah Gyan	Ghana	(England) Sunderland	0.46%
19th	Júlio César	Brazil	(Italy) Internazionale	0.22%
20th	Cesc Fàbregas	Spain	(England) Arsenal	0.22%
21st	Miroslav Klose	Germany	(Germany) Bayern Munich	0.19%
22nd	Philipp Lahm	Germany	(Germany) Bayern Munich	0.05%
23rd	Dani Alves	Brazil	(Spain) Barcelona	0.05%

=== FIFA Women's World Player of the Year ===
Rank	Player	National team	Club(s)	Percent
1st	Marta	Brazil	(United States) FC Gold Pride	38.20%
2nd	Birgit Prinz	Germany	(Germany) 1. FFC Frankfurt	15.18%
3rd	Fatmire Bajramaj	Germany	(Germany) Turbine Potsdam	9.96%

The following seven players were also in contention for the award:

Rank	Player	Nationality	Club(s)	Percent
4th	Kelly Smith	England	(United States) Boston Breakers	9.29%
5th	Abby Wambach	United States	(United States) Washington Freedom	6.25%
6th	Ji So-yun	South Korea	(South Korea) Hanyang Women's College	5.24%
7th	Christine Sinclair	Canada	(United States) FC Gold Pride	4.42%
8th	Hope Solo	United States	(United States) Saint Louis Athletica (United States) Atlanta Beat	3.85%
9th	Caroline Seger	Sweden	(United States) Philadelphia Independence	3.64%
10th	Camille Abily	France	(United States) FC Gold Pride (France) Lyon	3.38%

=== FIFA World Coach of the Year for Men's Football ===
Rank	Coach	Nationality	Team(s)	Percent
1st	José Mourinho	Portugal	(Italy) Internazionale (Spain) Real Madrid	35.92%
2nd	Vicente del Bosque	Spain	Spain	33.08%
3rd	Pep Guardiola	Spain	(Spain) Barcelona	8.45%

=== FIFA World Coach of the Year for Women's Football ===
Rank	Coach	Nationality	Team(s)	Percent
1st	Silvia Neid	Germany	Germany	24.06%
2nd	Maren Meinert	Germany	Germany U20	18.26%
3rd	Pia Sundhage	Sweden	United States	11.68%

=== FIFA Puskás Award ===
Rank	Player	Nationality	Club	Percent
1st	Hamit Altıntop	Turkey	(Germany) Bayern Munich	40.55%
2nd	Linus Hallenius	Sweden	(Sweden) Hammarby IF	13.23%
3rd	Giovanni van Bronckhorst	Netherlands	Netherlands	10.61%

=== FIFA/FIFPro World XI ===

Position	Player	National team	Club(s)
GK	Iker Casillas	Spain	(Spain) Real Madrid
DF	Maicon	Brazil	(Italy) Internazionale
DF	Carles Puyol	Spain	(Spain) Barcelona
DF	Gerard Piqué	Spain	(Spain) Barcelona
DF	Lúcio	Brazil	(Italy) Internazionale
MF	Andrés Iniesta	Spain	(Spain) Barcelona
MF	Xavi	Spain	(Spain) Barcelona
MF	Wesley Sneijder	Netherlands	(Italy) Internazionale
FW	David Villa	Spain	(Spain) Valencia (Spain) Barcelona
FW	Cristiano Ronaldo	Portugal	(Spain) Real Madrid
FW	Lionel Messi	Argentina	(Spain) Barcelona

=== FIFA Presidential Award ===
- (South Africa) Desmond Tutu

=== FIFA Fair Play Award ===
- Haiti women's national under-17 football team
