= 1991 FIFA World Player of the Year =

Association football award

The 1991 FIFA World Player of the Year award was won by Lothar Matthäus. The ceremony took place at the Madison Square Garden in New York, on December 8, 1991, as part of the 1994 FIFA World Cup preliminary draw. 83 national team coaches were chosen to vote.

== Results ==
Rank	Player	Club(s)	Country	Points
1	Lothar Matthäus	(Italy) Internazionale	West Germany	128
2	Jean-Pierre Papin	(France) Marseille	France	113
3	Gary Lineker	(England) Tottenham Hotspur	England	40
4	Robert Prosinečki	(Federal Republic of Yugoslavia) Red Star Belgrade (Spain) Real Madrid	(Federal Republic of Yugoslavia) Yugoslavia	38
5	Marco van Basten	(Italy) Milan	Netherlands	23
6	Franco Baresi	(Italy) Milan	Italy	12
7	Iván Zamorano	(Spain) Sevilla	Chile	10
8	Andreas Brehme	(Italy) Internazionale	West Germany	9
9	Gianluca Vialli	(Italy) Sampdoria	Italy	8
10	Enzo Scifo	(France) Auxerre (Italy) Torino	Belgium	7
