= 1995 FIFA World Player of the Year =

Association football award

The 1995 FIFA World Player of the Year award was won by George Weah. He is the first African player to win the award and the only one to date. The gala took place at the Teatro Nazionale in Milan, on January 8, 1996. 95 national team coaches, based on the current FIFA Men's World Ranking were chosen to vote. It was organised by European Sports Media, Adidas, FIFA and Italian newspaper Gazzetta dello Sport.

== Results ==
Rank	Player	Club(s)	Country	Points
1	George Weah	(France) Paris Saint-Germain (Italy) Milan	Liberia	170
2	Paolo Maldini	(Italy) Milan	Italy	80
3	Jürgen Klinsmann	(England) Tottenham Hotspur (Germany) Bayern Munich	Germany	58
4	Romário	(Spain) Barcelona (Brazil) Flamengo	Brazil	50
5	Roberto Baggio	(Italy) Juventus (Italy) Milan	Italy	49
6	Hristo Stoichkov	(Spain) Barcelona (Italy) Parma Calcio 1913	Bulgaria	37
7	Iván Zamorano	(Spain) Real Madrid	Chile	36
8	Juninho	(Brazil) São Paulo (England) Middlesbrough	Brazil	28
9	Matthias Sammer	(Germany) Borussia Dortmund	Germany	23
10=	Michael Laudrup	(Spain) Real Madrid	Denmark	20
10=	Gianfranco Zola	(Italy) Parma	Italy	20
