= 1993 FIFA World Player of the Year =

Association football award

The 1993 FIFA World Player of the Year award was won by Roberto Baggio. The ceremony took place at the Caesars Palace in Las Vegas, on December 19, 1993, as part of the 1994 FIFA World Cup finals draw. 71 national team coaches, based on the current FIFA Men's World Ranking were chosen to vote. It was organised by the European Sports Media, Adidas, Energizer and FIFA.

== Results ==
Rank	Player	Club(s)	Country	Points
1	Roberto Baggio	(Italy) Juventus	Italy	152
2	Romário	(Netherlands) PSV (Spain) Barcelona	Brazil	84
3	Dennis Bergkamp	(Netherlands) Ajax (Italy) Internazionale	Netherlands	58
4	Peter Schmeichel	(England) Manchester United	Denmark	29
5	Hristo Stoichkov	(Spain) Barcelona	Bulgaria	22
6	Faustino Asprilla	(Italy) Parma	Colombia	21
7	Bebeto	(Spain) Deportivo La Coruña	Brazil	16
8	Ronald Koeman	(Spain) Barcelona	Netherlands	15
9	Tony Yeboah	(Germany) Eintracht Frankfurt	Ghana	13
10	Raí	(France) Paris Saint-Germain	Brazil	12
