= 1997 FIFA World Player of the Year =

Association football award

The 1997 FIFA World Player of the Year award was won by Ronaldo, who became the first player to win the award two consecutive seasons. The ceremony took place at the Disneyland Paris, on January 12, 1998. 121 national team coaches, based on the current FIFA Men's World Ranking were chosen to vote. It was organised by European Sports Media, Adidas and FIFA.

== Results ==
Rank	Player	Points	Club(s)
1	(Brazil) Ronaldo	480	(Spain) Barcelona (Italy) Internazionale
2	(Brazil) Roberto Carlos	85	(Spain) Real Madrid
3=	(Netherlands) Dennis Bergkamp	62	(England) Arsenal
3=	(France) Zinedine Zidane	62	(Italy) Juventus
5	(Spain) Raúl	51	(Spain) Real Madrid
6	(Italy) Alessandro Del Piero	27	(Italy) Juventus
7	(Croatia) Davor Šuker	20	(Spain) Real Madrid
8=	(Argentina) Gabriel Batistuta	16	(Italy) Fiorentina
8=	(England) Alan Shearer	16	(England) Newcastle United
10=	(Brazil) Leonardo	14	(France) Paris Saint-Germain (Italy) Milan
10=	(Denmark) Peter Schmeichel	14	(England) Manchester United
