= 1996 FIFA World Player of the Year =

Association football award

The 1996 FIFA World Player of the Year award was won by Ronaldo, the youngest player to ever win the award, aged 20. The ceremony took place at the Belem Cultural Centre in Lisbon, on January 20, 1997. For the first time a record of 120 national team coaches, based on the current FIFA Men's World Ranking were chosen to vote. It was organised by European Sports Media, Adidas and FIFA.

== Results ==
Rank	Player	Club(s)	Country	Points
1	Ronaldo	(Netherlands) PSV (Spain) Barcelona	Brazil	329
2	George Weah	(Italy) Milan	Liberia	140
3	Alan Shearer	(England) Blackburn Rovers (England) Newcastle United	England	123
4	Matthias Sammer	(Germany) Borussia Dortmund	Germany	109
5	Jürgen Klinsmann	(Germany) Bayern Munich	Germany	54
6	Nwankwo Kanu	(Netherlands) Ajax (Italy) Inter Milan	Nigeria	32
7	Paolo Maldini	(Italy) Milan	Italy	25
8	Davor Šuker	(Spain) Sevilla (Spain) Real Madrid	Croatia	24
9	Gabriel Batistuta	(Italy) Fiorentina	Argentina	19
10	Romário	(Brazil) Flamengo (Spain) Valencia	Brazil	13
