= 1994 FIFA World Player of the Year =

Association football award

The FIFA World Player of the Year award of 1994 was won by the Brazilian striker Romário, while the second place went to the Bulgarian Hristo Stoichkov. Third came Roberto Baggio from Juventus. The ceremony took place at the Belem Cultural Centre in Lisbon, on January 30, 1995. 71 national team coaches, based on the current FIFA Men's World Ranking were chosen to vote. It was organised by European Sports Media, Adidas and FIFA.

== Results ==
Rank	Player	Club(s)	Country	Points
1	Romário	(Spain) Barcelona	Brazil	346
2	Hristo Stoichkov	(Spain) Barcelona	Bulgaria	100
3	Roberto Baggio	(Italy) Juventus	Italy	80
4	Gheorghe Hagi	(Spain) Barcelona	Romania	50
5	Paolo Maldini	(Italy) Milan	Italy	40
6	Bebeto	(Spain) Deportivo La Coruña	Brazil	16
7	Dennis Bergkamp	(Italy) Internazionale	Netherlands	11
8	Dunga	(Germany) VfB Stuttgart	Brazil	9
9=	Franco Baresi	(Italy) Milan	Italy	7
9=	Tomas Brolin	(Italy) Parma	Sweden	7
9=	Jürgen Klinsmann	(England) Tottenham Hotspur	Germany	7
9=	Mauro Silva	(Spain) Deportivo La Coruña	Brazil	7
