= 1992 FIFA World Player of the Year =

Association football award

The 1992 FIFA World Player of the Year award was won by Marco van Basten. The gala took place at the Casino Estoril in Lisbon, Portugal on February 1, 1993, organised by FIFA, the European Sports Media and the Portuguese newspaper A Bola. 71 national team coaches were chosen to vote. It was sponsored by the brand Adidas.

== Results ==
Rank	Player	Club(s)	Points
1	(Netherlands) Marco van Basten	(Italy) Milan	161
2	(Bulgaria) Hristo Stoichkov	(Spain) Barcelona	88
3	(Germany) Thomas Häßler	(Italy) Roma	61
4	(France) Jean-Pierre Papin	(France) Marseille (Italy) Milan	46
5	(Denmark) Brian Laudrup	(Germany) Bayern Munich (Italy) Fiorentina	44
5	(Denmark) Peter Schmeichel	(England) Manchester United	44
7	(Netherlands) Dennis Bergkamp	(Netherlands) Ajax	29
8	(Netherlands) Frank Rijkaard	(Italy) Milan	23
9	(Ghana) Abedi Pele	(France) Marseille	10
9	(Italy) Franco Baresi	(Italy) Milan	10
9	(Germany) Jürgen Klinsmann	(Italy) Internazionale (France) Monaco	10
12	(Netherlands) Ronald Koeman	(Spain) Barcelona	7
13	(Argentina) Gabriel Batistuta	(Italy) Fiorentina	6
13	(Portugal) Paulo Futre	(Spain) Atlético Madrid	6
15	(Brazil) Bebeto	(Brazil) Vasco da Gama (Spain) Deportivo La Coruña	5
15	(Netherlands) Ruud Gullit	(Italy) Milan	5
15	(Germany) Karl-Heinz Riedle	(Italy) Lazio	5
15	(Socialist Federal Republic of Yugoslavia) Dejan Savićević	(Socialist Federal Republic of Yugoslavia) Red Star Belgrade (Italy) Milan	5
15	(Liberia) George Weah	(France) Monaco (France) Paris Saint-Germain	5
15	(Uruguay) José Zalazar	(Spain) Albacete	5
15	(Spain) Andoni Zubizarreta	(Spain) Barcelona	5
24	(England) Gary Lineker	(England) Tottenham Hotspur (Japan) Nagoya Grampus	4
24	(Germany) Rudi Völler	(Italy) Roma (France) Marseille	4
26	(Argentina) Claudio Caniggia	(Italy) Atalanta (Italy) Roma	3
26	(Italy) Paolo Maldini	(Italy) Milan	3
33	(Italy) Gianluigi Lentini	(Italy) Torino (Italy) Milan	2
33	(Italy) Gianluca Vialli	(Italy) Sampdoria (Italy) Juventus	2
