= FIFA Development Award =

Association football award

The FIFA Development Award was an award given out by FIFA in 2008 and 2009 which was designed to exemplify the extraordinary amount of effort and financial support which go into increasing the development of football in those countries which need it most.

== Winners ==
| Year | Winner | Reason | Notes |
|---|---|---|---|
| 2008 | Palestine | In recognition of the Palestinian FA, who accomplished the difficult task of renovating the Faisal Al-Husseini Stadium and thus creating a national stadium for Palestine which met FIFA standards and allowing them to play their first official international match on home soil. | Details |
| 2009 | China | In recognition of the Chinese FA, who have successfully engaged a grassroots program in which more than a million Chinese youths are to be involved in the development of the country's next generation of footballers. | Details |
