= 1998 FIFA World Player of the Year =

Association football award

The 1998 FIFA World Player of the Year award was won by Zinedine Zidane. The ceremony was held at the Teatro Nacional de Catalunya, in Barcelona on February 1, 1999. 132 national team coaches, based on the current FIFA Men's World Ranking were chosen to vote. It was organised by European Sports Media, Adidas, FIFA and the Spanish newspaper Don Balon.

== Results ==
Rank	Player	Points	Club(s)
1.	(France) Zinedine Zidane	518	(Italy) Juventus
2.	(Brazil) Ronaldo	164	(Italy) Internazionale
3.	(Croatia) Davor Šuker	108	(Spain) Real Madrid
4.	(England) Michael Owen	43	(England) Liverpool
5.	(Argentina) Gabriel Batistuta	40	(Italy) Fiorentina
6.	(Brazil) Rivaldo	37	(Spain) Barcelona
7.	(Netherlands) Dennis Bergkamp	33	(England) Arsenal
8.	(Netherlands) Edgar Davids	26	(Italy) Juventus
9.	(France) Marcel Desailly	23	(Italy) Milan (England) Chelsea
10.	(France) Lilian Thuram	14	(Italy) Parma
