= 2004 FIFA World Player of the Year =

Association football award

The 2004 FIFA World Player of the Year award was won by Brazilian Ronaldinho for the first time; Thierry Henry finished second for the second year in succession. It was the award's 14th edition. The award ceremony took place on the evening of December 20, 2004, and was held at the Zurich Opera House in Zurich, Switzerland. There were 157 coaches and 145 captains selected for the voting process, totaling 302 votes.

Birgit Prinz won the women's award for the second time, for the second year in succession. The 2-time award winner Mia Hamm also finished second for the second year in succession. For the women's side, there were 114 coaches and 109 captains selected for the voting process, totaling 223 votes.

== Results ==
=== Men ===
Rank	Player	Points	Club(s)
1	(Brazil) Ronaldinho	620	(Spain) Barcelona
2	(France) Thierry Henry	552	(England) Arsenal
3	(Ukraine) Andriy Shevchenko	253	(Italy) Milan
4	(Czech Republic) Pavel Nedvěd	178	(Italy) Juventus
5	(France) Zinedine Zidane	150	(Spain) Real Madrid
6	(Brazil) Adriano	98	(Italy) Internazionale
7=	(Portugal) Deco	96	(Spain) Barcelona (Portugal) Porto
7=	(Brazil) Ronaldo	96	(Spain) Real Madrid
9	(Netherlands) Ruud van Nistelrooy	67	(England) Manchester United
10=	(Brazil) Kaká	64	(Italy) Milan
10=	(England) Wayne Rooney	64	(England) Everton (England) Manchester United
12	(Ivory Coast) Didier Drogba	46	(France) Marseille (England) Chelsea
13	(Portugal) Cristiano Ronaldo	45	(England) Manchester United
14	(Cameroon) Samuel Eto'o	42	(Spain) Mallorca (Spain) Barcelona
15=	(Portugal) Luís Figo	35	(Spain) Real Madrid
15=	(England) David Beckham	35	(Spain) Real Madrid
17=	(Spain) Raúl	25	(Spain) Real Madrid
17=	(Greece) Theodoros Zagorakis	25	(Greece) AEK Athens (Italy) Bologna
19	(Argentina) Roberto Ayala	24	(Spain) Valencia
20	(England) Michael Owen	22	(England) Liverpool (Spain) Real Madrid
21=	(Brazil) Roberto Carlos	19	(Spain) Real Madrid
21=	(Italy) Paolo Maldini	19	(Italy) Milan
21=	(Italy) Gianluigi Buffon	19	(Italy) Juventus
24	(Netherlands) Roy Makaay	17	(Germany) Bayern Munich
25	(France) Robert Pires	15	(England) Arsenal
26	(England) Frank Lampard	13	(England) Chelsea
27	(Brazil) Cafu	10	(Italy) Milan
28=	(Germany) Michael Ballack	9	(Germany) Bayern Munich
28=	(Czech Republic) Milan Baroš	9	(England) Liverpool
30=	(Sweden) Zlatan Ibrahimović	7	(Netherlands) Ajax (Italy) Juventus
30=	(Sweden) Henrik Larsson	7	(Scotland) Celtic (Spain) Barcelona
32=	(Wales) Ryan Giggs	6	(England) Manchester United
32=	(Italy) Alessandro Nesta	6	(Italy) Milan
34	(England) Steven Gerrard	5	(England) Liverpool
35	(Germany) Oliver Kahn	4	(Germany) Bayern Munich

=== Women ===
Rank	Player	Club(s)	Points
1	(Germany) Birgit Prinz	(Germany) FFC Frankfurt	376
2	(United States) Mia Hamm		286
3	(Brazil) Marta	(Brazil) Santa Cruz (Sweden) Umeå IK	281
4	(United States) Abby Wambach		126
5	(United States) Kristine Lilly	(United States) Boston Breakers	109
5	(Sweden) Hanna Ljungberg	(Sweden) Umeå IK	109
7	(United States) Shannon Boxx		102
8	(Germany) Renate Lingor	(Germany) FFC Frankfurt	89
8	(Sweden) Victoria Svensson	(Sweden) Djurgårdens IF	89
10	(Brazil) Cristiane	(Brazil) Juventus-SP	80
11	(Brazil) Pretinha		68
12	(Brazil) Formiga	(Sweden) Malmö FF	54
