= 2006 FIFA World Player of the Year =

Association football award

The 2006 FIFA World Player of the Year prize was awarded to the Italian Fabio Cannavaro for the first time. He finished ahead of retired midfielder Zinedine Zidane, who won the Golden Ball at the World Cup and the winner of the 2005 FIFA World Player of the Year Ronaldinho in the final round of voting. There were 165 coaches and 165 captains selected for the voting process, totaling 330 votes.

The Women FIFA World Player of the Year was Marta, who won it for the first time. On the women's side, 147 coaches and 149 captains were selected for the voting process, totaling 296 votes.

== Results ==
=== Men ===
Rank	Player	Points	Team
1	(Italy) Fabio Cannavaro	498	(Spain) Real Madrid (Italy) Juventus
2	(France) Zinedine Zidane	454	(Spain) Real Madrid
3	(Brazil) Ronaldinho	380	(Spain) Barcelona
4	(France) Thierry Henry	317	(England) Arsenal
5	(Cameroon) Samuel Eto'o	300	(Spain) Barcelona
6	(Ivory Coast) Didier Drogba	150	(England) Chelsea
7	(Brazil) Kaká	139	(Italy) Milan
8	(Italy) Gianluigi Buffon	118	(Italy) Juventus
9	(Italy) Andrea Pirlo	86	(Italy) Milan
10	(Portugal) Cristiano Ronaldo	69	(England) Manchester United
11	(Germany) Michael Ballack	53	(England) Chelsea (Germany) Bayern Munich
12	(England) Steven Gerrard	48	(England) Liverpool
13	(Germany) Miroslav Klose	46	(Germany) Werder Bremen
14	(England) Frank Lampard	31	(England) Chelsea
15	(Portugal) Deco	25	(Spain) Barcelona
16	(Portugal) Luís Figo	20	(Italy) Internazionale
17	(Argentina) Juan Román Riquelme	16	(Spain) Villarreal
	(France) Franck Ribéry	16	(France) Marseille
	(England) Wayne Rooney	16	(England) Manchester United
20	(Italy) Gennaro Gattuso	15	(Italy) Milan
21	(Ukraine) Andriy Shevchenko	14	(England) Chelsea (Italy) Milan
22	(France) Patrick Vieira	13	(Italy) Internazionale (Italy) Juventus
	(Ghana) Michael Essien	13	(England) Chelsea
24	(Czech Republic) Petr Čech	11	(England) Chelsea
25	(Italy) Alessandro Nesta	9	(Italy) Milan
26	(France) Lilian Thuram	8	(Spain) Barcelona (Italy) Juventus
27	(Germany) Jens Lehmann	6	(England) Arsenal
28	(Germany) Philipp Lahm	3	(Germany) Bayern Munich
29	(Brazil) Adriano	2	(Italy) Internazionale
30	(Czech Republic) Tomáš Rosický	0	(England) Arsenal (Germany) Borussia Dortmund

=== Women ===
Rank	Player	Club	Points
1	(Brazil) Marta	(Sweden) Umeå IK	475
2	(United States) Kristine Lilly		388
3	(Germany) Renate Lingor	(Germany) FFC Frankfurt	305
4	(United States) Abby Wambach		182
5	(England) Kelly Smith	(England) Arsenal L.F.C.	157
6	(Germany) Silke Rottenberg	(Germany) FCR Duisburg (Germany) FFC Frankfurt	154
7	(China) Han Duan		116
8	(China) Ma Xiaoxu	(China) Dalian Shide	99
9	(Sweden) Malin Moström	(Sweden) Umeå IK	87
10	(Sweden) Lotta Schelin	(Sweden) Göteborg FC	82
11	(Nigeria) Cynthia Uwak	(Finland) FC United	81
12	(North Korea) Ri Kum-Suk	(North Korea) 4.25 SC	64
13	(Norway) Ingvild Stensland	(Norway) Kolbotn	54
14	(France) Laura Georges		48
15	(Canada) Christine Sinclair	(Canada) Vancouver Whitecaps	39
16	(Mexico) Mónica Ocampo	(United States) F.C. Indiana	34
17	(France) Sandrine Soubeyrand	(France) FCF Juvisy	31
18	(Finland) Laura Kalmari	(Sweden) Djurgårdens IF	24
19	(Australia) Cheryl Salisbury		12
20	(Denmark) Cathrine Paaske Sørensen	(Denmark) Brøndby IF	11
