= 2000 FIFA World Player of the Year =

Association football award

The 2000 FIFA World Player of the Year award was won by Zinedine Zidane for the second time following France's 2000 European Championship win. The gala was hosted at the Television Studio in Rome, on December 11, 2000. 150 national team coaches, based on the current FIFA Men's World Ranking were chosen to vote. It was organised by European Sports Media, Adidas, FIFA and the Italian newspaper Gazzetta dello Sport.

== Results ==
Rank	Player	Club(s)	Country	Points
1	Zinedine Zidane	(Italy) Juventus	France	370
2	Luís Figo	(Spain) Barcelona (Spain) Real Madrid	Portugal	329
3	Rivaldo	(Spain) Barcelona	Brazil	263
4	Gabriel Batistuta	(Italy) Fiorentina (Italy) Roma	Argentina	57
5	Andriy Shevchenko	(Italy) Milan	Ukraine	48
6	David Beckham	(England) Manchester United	England	41
7	Thierry Henry	(England) Arsenal	France	35
8	Alessandro Nesta	(Italy) Lazio	Italy	23
9	Patrick Kluivert	(Spain) Barcelona	Netherlands	22
10=	Francesco Totti	(Italy) Roma	Italy	14
10=	Raúl	(Spain) Real Madrid	Spain	14
