= 2003 FIFA World Player of the Year =

Association football award

The 2003 FIFA World Player of the Year award was won by Zinedine Zidane for a record-equalling third time. It was the award's 13th edition. The gala was hosted at the Messe in Basel, on December 15, 2003. 142 national team coaches, based on the current FIFA Men's World Ranking were chosen to vote for the men's edition and 100 for the women's. The ceremony's theme was the Match Against Poverty, which was played the previous day between Ronaldo Nazario and Zinedine Zidane (3-4) at the St. Jakob-Park in Basel in front of 30,000 spectators.

Birgit Prinz won the women's award for the first time.

== Results ==
=== Men ===
Rank	Player	Club(s)	Country	Points
1	Zinedine Zidane	(Spain) Real Madrid	France	264
2	Thierry Henry	(England) Arsenal	France	186
3	Ronaldo	(Spain) Real Madrid	Brazil	176
4	Pavel Nedvěd	(Italy) Juventus	Czech Republic	158
5	Roberto Carlos	(Spain) Real Madrid	Brazil	105
6	Ruud van Nistelrooy	(England) Manchester United	Netherlands	86
7	David Beckham	(England) Manchester United (Spain) Real Madrid	England	74
8	Raúl	(Spain) Real Madrid	Spain	39
9	Paolo Maldini	(Italy) Milan	Italy	37
10	Andrei Shevchenko	(Italy) Milan	Ukraine	26
11	Luís Figo	(Spain) Real Madrid	Portugal	17
12	Michael Ballack	(Germany) Bayern Munich	Germany	15
13	Oliver Kahn	(Germany) Bayern Munich	Germany	13
14	Pablo Aimar	(Spain) Valencia	Argentina	9
15	Gianluigi Buffon	(Italy) Juventus	Italy	8
16=	Filippo Inzaghi	(Italy) Milan	Italy	6
16=	Michael Owen	(England) Liverpool	England	6
18=	Alessandro Nesta	(Italy) Milan	Italy	5
18=	Fernando Morientes	(Spain) Real Madrid (France) Monaco	Spain	5
20=	Cafu	(Italy) Milan	Brazil	3
20=	Dado Pršo	(France) Monaco	Croatia	3
20=	Fabio Cannavaro	(Italy) Internazionale	Italy	3
20=	Henrik Larsson	(Scotland) Celtic	Sweden	3
20=	Paul Freier	(Germany) VfL Bochum	Germany	3
20=	Rivaldo	(Italy) Milan	Brazil	3
20=	Robert Pires	(England) Arsenal	France	3
20=	Ronaldinho	(France) Paris Saint-Germain (Spain) Barcelona	Brazil	3
28=	Paul Scholes	(England) Manchester United	England	2
28=	Samuel Eto'o	(Spain) Mallorca	Cameroon	2

=== Women ===
Rank	Player	Club(s)	Points
1	(Germany) Birgit Prinz	(United States) Carolina Courage (Germany) FFC Frankfurt	268
2	(United States) Mia Hamm	(United States) Washington Freedom	133
3	(Sweden) Hanna Ljungberg	(Sweden) Umeå IK	84
4	(Sweden) Victoria Svensson	(Sweden) Djurgårdens IF	82
5	(Germany) Maren Meinert	(United States) Boston Breakers	69
6	(Germany) Bettina Wiegmann	(Germany) FFC Brauweiler	49
7	(Sweden) Malin Moström	(Sweden) Umeå IK	23
8=	(Brazil) Katia	(Spain) Levante	14
8=	(Germany) Renate Lingor	(Germany) FFC Frankfurt	14
10=	(Brazil) Marta	(Sweden) Umeå IK	13
10=	(Germany) Silke Rottenberg	(Germany) FFC Brauweiler (Germany) FCR Duisburg	13
12	(France) Marinette Pichon	(United States) Philadelphia Charge (France) Saint-Memmie Olympique	11
13	(Canada) Charmaine Hooper	(United States) Atlanta Beat	10
