= 2008 FIFA World Player of the Year =

Association football award

The 2008 FIFA World Player of the Year awards took place on 12 January 2009 at the Zurich Opera House, Zürich, Switzerland, with Cristiano Ronaldo of Manchester United and Portugal taking the men's award, and Marta of Umeå IK and Brazil taking the women's award for the third consecutive season.

Other awards included the FIFA Development Award, which went to the Palestinian Football Federation for keeping its organisation and national team active; Federation President Jibril Al Rajoub, captain of the men's team Ahmad Kashkash, and women's team captain Honey Thaljiyeh were presented with the award. The Palestinian FA carried out a major refurbishment of the Al-Husseini Stadium, meaning that it met the standards to host an international match, becoming the first stadium in Palestinian territories to achieve this honour. Women's football received the FIFA Presidential Award, with the US team presented with the award (for their achievements), and player Heather O'Reilly collecting it. The FIFA Fair Play Award went to the representatives of the Turkish and Armenia national teams. Prior to a European World Cup qualifying match, the Presidents of the two FAs, Mahmut Özgener (Turkey) and Ruben Hayrapetyan (Armenia) shook hands, which was significant as the countries shared a long history of hostility towards each other.

Shortlists of 23 men and 10 women were announced on 29 October 2008, before being reduced to five men and five women by 12 December 2008. The male nominees were Kaká, Lionel Messi, Cristiano Ronaldo, Fernando Torres and Xavi, and the female nominees were Nadine Angerer, Cristiane, Marta, Birgit Prinz and Kelly Smith.

== Results ==
=== Men ===
Rank	Player	Points	Club(s)
1	(Portugal) Cristiano Ronaldo	935	(England) Manchester United
2	(Argentina) Lionel Messi	678	(Spain) Barcelona
3	(Spain) Fernando Torres	203	(England) Liverpool
4	(Brazil) Kaká	183	(Italy) Milan
5	(Spain) Xavi	155	(Spain) Barcelona
6	(England) Steven Gerrard	98	(England) Liverpool
7	(Cameroon) Samuel Eto'o	58	(Spain) Barcelona
8	(Spain) Iker Casillas	49	(Spain) Real Madrid
9=	(Spain) Andrés Iniesta	37	(Spain) Barcelona
9=	(Spain) David Villa	37	(Spain) Valencia
11	(Russia) Andrey Arshavin	36	(Russia) Zenit Saint Petersburg
12	(England) Frank Lampard	33	(England) Chelsea
13	(Ivory Coast) Didier Drogba	30	(England) Chelsea
14=	(Germany) Michael Ballack	27	(England) Chelsea
14=	(Spain) Cesc Fàbregas	27	(England) Arsenal
16	(Sweden) Zlatan Ibrahimović	26	(Italy) Internazionale
17	(Togo) Emmanuel Adebayor	25	(England) Arsenal
18	(France) Franck Ribéry	23	(Germany) Bayern Munich
19	(Netherlands) Ruud van Nistelrooy	14	(Spain) Real Madrid
20	(Argentina) Sergio Agüero	12	(Spain) Atlético Madrid
21	(England) John Terry	11	(England) Chelsea
22	(Italy) Gianluigi Buffon	8	(Italy) Juventus
23	(Portugal) Deco	1	(Spain) Barcelona (England) Chelsea

=== Women ===
Rank	Player	Points	Club(s)
1	(Brazil) Marta	1002	(Sweden) Umeå
2	(Germany) Birgit Prinz	328	(Germany) Frankfurt
3	(Brazil) Cristiane	275	(Sweden) Linköping (Brazil) Corinthians
4	(Germany) Nadine Angerer	198	(Germany) 1. FFC Turbine Potsdam (Sweden) Djurgården
5	(England) Kelly Smith	150	(England) Arsenal
6	(Brazil) Daniela	130	(Brazil) Saad (Sweden) Linköping
7	(United States) Shannon Boxx	115	
8	(United States) Hope Solo	83	
9	(Canada) Christine Sinclair	47	(Canada) Vancouver Whitecaps
10	(Norway) Ingvild Stensland	41	(Sweden) Kopparbergs/Göteborg
