= 2002 FIFA World Player of the Year =

Association football award

The 2002 FIFA World Player of the Year award was won by Ronaldo for a record-breaking third time. It was the award's 12th edition. Mia Hamm won the women's award. The gala was hosted at the Congress Centre in Madrid, on December 17, 2002. 147 national team coaches, based on the current FIFA Men's World Ranking were chosen to vote for the men's edition and 77 for the women's. The ceremony theme was Real Madrid's Centenary Charity match against the World XI (3-3) that was played at the Santiago Bernabeu Stadium in front of 55,000 spectators.

== Results ==
=== Men ===
Rank	Player	Club(s)	Country	Points
1	Ronaldo	(Italy) Inter Milan (Spain) Real Madrid	Brazil	387
2	Oliver Kahn	(Germany) Bayern Munich	Germany	171
3	Zinedine Zidane	(Spain) Real Madrid	France	148
4	Roberto Carlos	(Spain) Real Madrid	Brazil	114
5	Rivaldo	(Spain) Barcelona (Italy) Milan	Brazil	92
6	Raúl	(Spain) Real Madrid	Spain	90
7	Michael Ballack	(Germany) Bayer Leverkusen (Germany) Bayern Munich	Germany	82
8	David Beckham	(England) Manchester United	England	51
9	Thierry Henry	(England) Arsenal	France	38
10	Michael Owen	(England) Liverpool	England	34

=== Women ===
Rank	Player	Club(s)	Points
1	(United States) Mia Hamm	(United States) Washington Freedom	161
2	(Germany) Birgit Prinz	(Germany) FFC Frankfurt (United States) Carolina Courage	96
3	(China) Sun Wen	(United States) Atlanta Beat (China) Shanghai SVA	58
4	(United States) Tiffeny Milbrett	(United States) New York Power	45
5	(France) Marinette Pichon	(France) Saint-Memmie Olympique (United States) Philadelphia Charge	42
6	(Canada) Christine Sinclair	(Canada) Vancouver Whitecaps	38
7	(Germany) Steffi Jones	(United States) Washington Freedom	19
8	(Norway) Hege Riise	(United States) Carolina Courage	17
9	(Brazil) Sissi	(United States) San Jose CyberRays	14
10	(China) Bai Jie	(United States) Washington Freedom	13
11	(Sweden) Hanna Ljungberg	(Sweden) Umeå IK	11
12=	(United States) Kristine Lilly	(United States) Boston Breakers	10
12=	(Brazil) Katia	(United States) San Jose CyberRays	10
