= 1999 FIFA World Player of the Year =

Association football award

The 1999 FIFA World Player of the Year award was won by Rivaldo. The gala was hosted at the Palais de Congress Brussels, on 24 January 2000. 132 national team coaches, based on the current FIFA Men's World Ranking were chosen to vote. It was organised by European Sports Media, Adidas, International Football Hall of Champions, FIFA and the Voetbal International Magazine of Belgium.

David Beckham took the second place – the highest ever position for an English footballer. Argentina striker Gabriel Batistuta came third.

== Results ==
| Rank | Player | Club(s) | Country | 1P | 2P | 3P | 4P | 5P | Points |
|---|---|---|---|---|---|---|---|---|---|
| 1 | Rivaldo | (Spain) Barcelona | Brazil | 63 | 40 | 14 | 7 | 5 | 543 |
| 2 | David Beckham | (England) Manchester United | England | 31 | 16 | 21 | 11 | 9 | 194 |
| 3 | Gabriel Batistuta | (Italy) Fiorentina | Argentina | 8 | 8 | 15 | 17 | 7 | 79 |
| 4 | Zinedine Zidane | (Italy) Juventus | France | 3 | 14 | 7 | 7 | 3 | 68 |
| 5 | Christian Vieri | (Italy) Lazio (Italy) Inter Milan | Italy | 1 | 3 | 6 | 10 | 8 | 39 |
| 6 | Luís Figo | (Spain) Barcelona | Portugal | 11 | 4 | | 11 | 12 | 35 |
| 7 | Andriy Shevchenko | (Ukraine) Dynamo Kyiv (Italy) Milan | Ukraine | 11 | 10 | 19 | 13 | 8 | 34 |
| 8 | Raúl | (Spain) Real Madrid | Spain | 3 | 5 | 6 | 6 | 6 | 31 |
| 9 | Andy Cole | (England) Manchester United | England | 1 | | 3 | 1 | 4 | 24 |
| 10 | Dwight Yorke | (England) Manchester United | Trinidad and Tobago | 1 | | 3 | 1 | 4 | 19 |
