= Kelly Smith =

English footballer (born 1978)

Kelly Smith MBE
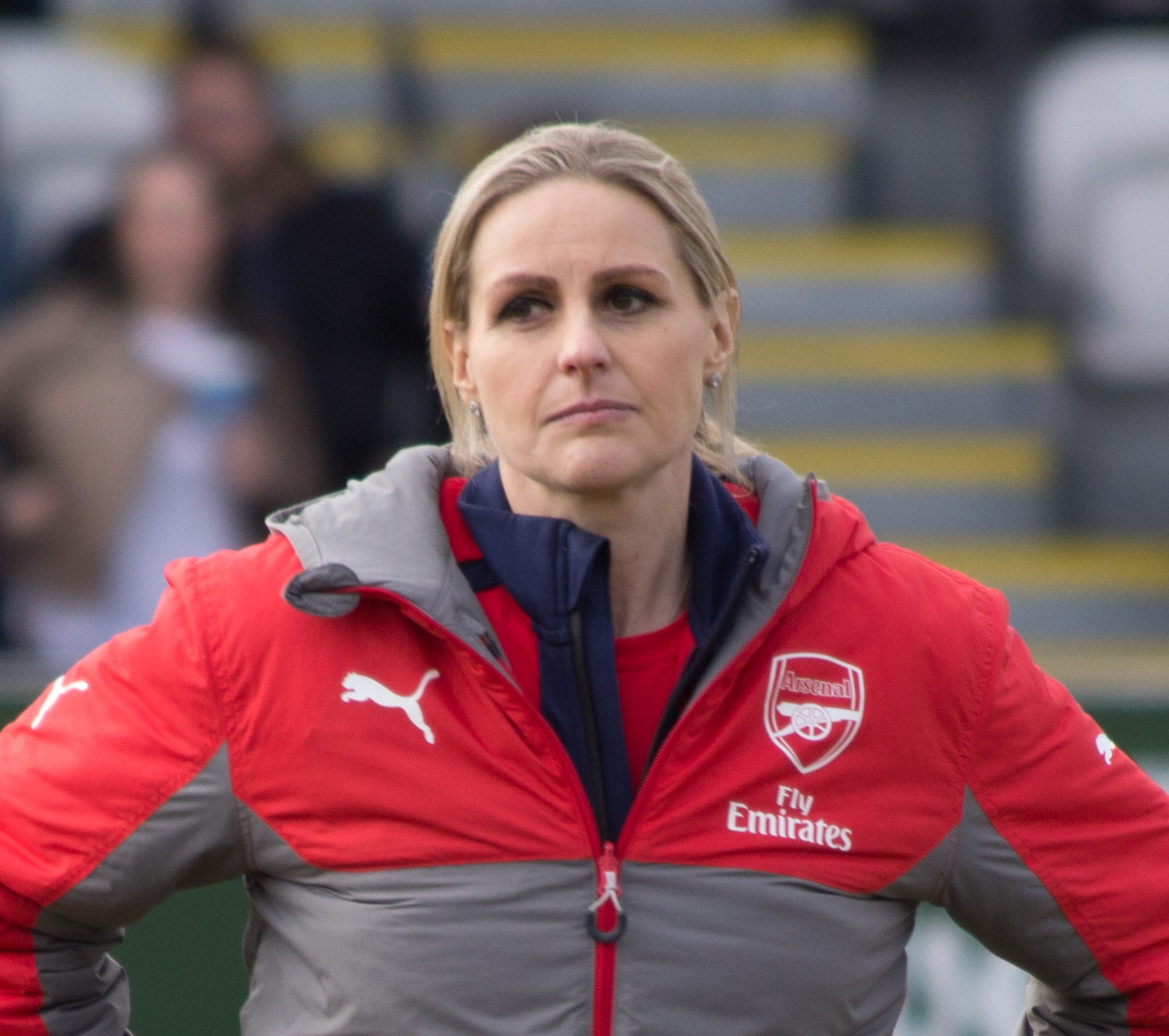
- Smith in 2017

Personal information
- Full name: Kelly Jayne Smith
- Date of birth: 29 October 1978 (age 48)
- Place of birth: Watford, Hertfordshire, England
- Height: 5 ft 6 in (1.68 m)
- Position: Forward

College career
Years	Team	Apps	(Gls)
1997–1999	Seton Hall Pirates	51	(76)

Senior career*
Years	Team	Apps	(Gls)
1994–1996	Wembley Ladies		
1996–1997	Arsenal		
1999–2000	New Jersey Lady Stallions		
2001–2003	Philadelphia Charge	26	(9)
2004	New Jersey Wildcats	8	(8)
2005–2009	Arsenal	66	(73)
2009–2012	Boston Breakers	46	(18)
2012–2017	Arsenal	23	(9)

International career
1995–2014	England	117	(46)
2012	Great Britain	4	(0)

Managerial career
- 2023–: Arsenal (assistant)
- * Club domestic league appearances and goals

Kelly Jayne Smith MBE (born 29 October 1978) is an English former football forward who spent three spells with FA WSL club Arsenal. After moving to the United States, Smith broke records with Seton Hall University then played professionally with Women's United Soccer Association (WUSA) franchise Philadelphia Charge. After returning to Arsenal for a period which included a 2007 UEFA Women's Cup win, Smith was tempted back to America with another professional contract, this time with Boston Breakers in Women's Professional Soccer (WPS). She accumulated 117 caps for the England national team after making her debut in 1995. Despite being hit by serious injury during her career, Smith is England's second-highest goalscorer with 46 goals. She played for Great Britain at the 2012 London Olympics. Smith was renowned for her speed, ball control and quickness in which she developed into a potent centre forward. She is considered by many who played with and against her to be one of the greatest ever players to come out of England, as well as one of the greatest players of all time.

== Club career ==
=== Youth and university ===
While growing up in the Garston area of Watford, Smith regularly played football on boys' teams until, at the age of seven, she was kicked out of Garston Boys Club – despite being the top goalscorer – when the parents of her male opponents complained. After continuing at Pinner Girls, a team formed by Smith's father, she developed her skills at Wembley Ladies and made her senior debut in the 1994–95 season. In August 1995, Pete Davies wrote in The Independent that the "lethally quick, bountifully gifted" Smith was: "the outstanding prospect in the women's game today." After moving to Arsenal Ladies during 1996–97, she scored two goals and assisted on the third in a 3–0 win over Liverpool which secured the Premier League title that season. She spent that year at West Herts College, but transferred to Seton Hall University in the United States in 1997.

Smith enrolled at Seton Hall as a student-athlete. She played for the Seton Hall Pirates from 1997 through 1999. In her first year at Seton Hall in 1997, Smith set scoring records for the Big East Conference and became the first athlete in any sport to be the conference's (Offensive) Player of the Year and Newcomer of the Year in the same season. In the following two seasons, she was the leading scorer not only in the Big East, but in the whole of NCAA Division I, and was named Big East Offensive Player of the Year in both years. At the end of her university career, the school retired her number 6 shirt, she became the first Seton Hall athlete in any sport other than basketball to have a number retired. In her three years at Seton Hall, she set school records with 76 goals and 174 points while playing in just 51 matches.

=== United States ===
At the culmination of her studies, Smith remained in the United States, remarking: "women's football in England is a joke." Smith's first professional club was New Jersey Lady Stallions of W-League, for which she played on from 1999 to 2000. However, a new top-flight women's league was about to start in the United States and Smith stayed in the country to participate in the project.

The Women's United Soccer Association was formed in early 2000. Smith was drafted second overall in the 2001 WUSA Foreign Allocation Draft by Philadelphia Charge. Smith played all three seasons with Philadelphia and was named to the 2001 WUSA Global 11 All-Star Team. 2001 was her only full season in the league; in 2002, Smith missed most of the season after tearing her ACL in her right knee, and missed much of 2003 after re-injuring the same knee. Following the 2003 season, the WUSA ceased operations.

Smith decided to keep playing in the United States following the collapse of the WUSA. In 2004, she played for the New Jersey Wildcats in the W-League, but she was injured yet again, breaking her leg. She ended up appearing in eight games for the club (563 minutes) and tallied eight goals and six assists.

=== England ===
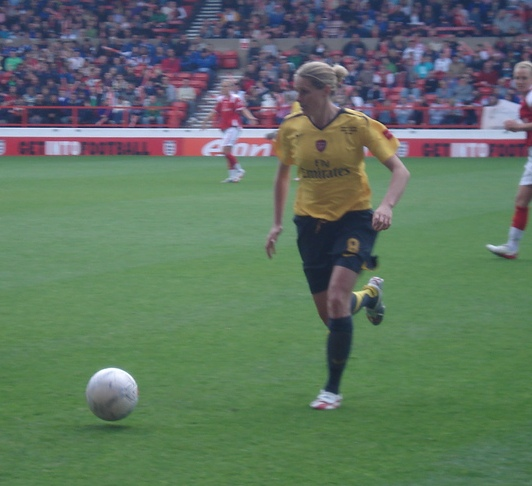
Smith in the 2007 FA Women's Cup final

Smith returned to England and Arsenal in the autumn of 2004. She officially rejoined in 2005 after being treated at the Sporting Chance clinic. However, she was yet again hampered by injury, this time by a stress fracture in her foot. She returned to action at the end of the 2004–05 season, scoring a goal from 30 metres out against Charlton Athletic L.F.C. which clinched the league title for Arsenal.

In Arsenal's "Quadruple" winning season of 2006–07, Smith scored 30 goals in 34 games across the four competitions. However, she missed both legs of the 2006–07 UEFA Women's Cup final through suspension, after being sent off for giving the finger to opposition fans in the semi-final.

During Smith's Arsenal career since rejoining in 2005, she appeared in 66 League games scoring 73 goals, 16 FA Cup games scoring 13 goals, 10 League Cup games scoring four goals, 18 UEFA Women's Cup games scoring nine goals, and two Community Shield games scoring one goal for a total of 112 appearances and 100 goals. In her last competitive game for Arsenal, Smith scored a hat-trick to help Arsenal to a 5–0 win over Doncaster Belles in the FA Women's Premier League Cup final. She won the FA Women's Players' Player of the year in 2006 and 2007.

=== Return to the United States ===
Upon the creation of a new women's league in the United States, Women's Professional Soccer, many teams were interested in Smith's services. She was chosen by the Boston Breakers second overall in the 2008 WPS International Draft, above Marta and under only Formiga.

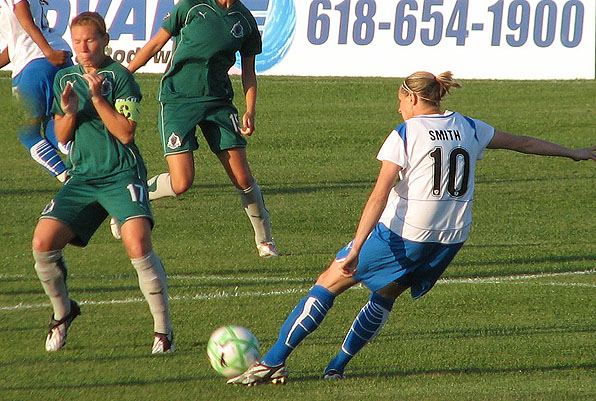
Smith against Saint Louis Athletica in 2009

Despite being drafted by Boston, she was still under contract with Arsenal. However, Smith decided to leave Arsenal to join Boston Breakers on 18 February 2009, one of a number of English players to join the new Women's Professional Soccer League.

In the inaugural 2009 Women's Professional Soccer season, Smith appeared in 15 games (13 starts, 1170 total minutes) and scored six goals with two assists. She was named to the WPS All-Star ballot, but was unavailable for the match due to England's participation at the European Championships. In 2010 Smith started all her 21 appearances, leading the team with 11 goals and five assists. She played in that season's All-Star game. 2011 saw Smith again afflicted by injury; she posted one goal and four assists in 10 appearances (nine starts, 850 minutes). When the WPS went on hiatus ahead of the 2012 season, Smith was left "devastated" and without a club.

=== Arsenal again ===
On leaving Boston Breakers, Smith resisted offers from clubs in Sweden and Germany to join Arsenal for a third time. However, she arrived with a stress fracture acquired at the 2012 Cyprus Cup and then aggravated the injury when kicking a ball during a promotional video shoot, without the protective footwear she had been instructed to wear.

== International career ==
=== England ===
Smith debuted for the England national team on 1 November 1995, three days after turning 17. The 1–1 draw against Italy was played at Roker Park and Smith won Player of the Match from her position on the left wing. She had been unable to accept a call-up to England's 1995 FIFA Women's World Cup squad that summer due to sitting her GCSE exams. Her first international goal came on the occasion of her second cap, against Croatia on 19 November 1995. Smith scored a stoppage-time penalty in England's 5–0 win at the Valley. During the following years, the English Football Association (FA) complained to FIFA when Smith's American college team refused to release her for national team duty.

When healthy, Smith has generally been considered one of the world's top female players; former United States head coach April Heinrichs asserted that Smith would be an automatic choice for the United States Women's National Team if she had been eligible, and Vera Pauw, the Dutch coach, called Kelly "the best player in the World" after she scored a hat-trick against the Netherlands in a 2007 FIFA Women's World Cup qualifier. During the 2011 World Cup, Mia Hamm said of Smith: "I remember the first time I saw Kelly play. She'd just graduated from Seton Hall. She's incredibly technical, with great speed of thought and play. Her touch is different class – everything's clean, everything's with a purpose. The pace of her passes is always perfect and she can score at will too." Smith's former England teammate and later coach, Hope Powell, went further than Hamm: "Kelly is one of those players who come along only once or twice in a lifetime. In the men's game you'd think of Diego Maradona or Messi, players with a unique talent, and that’s what Kelly has."

Smith has competed in the 2001, 2005, and 2009 editions of the UEFA Women's Championship, as well as the 2007 and 2011 FIFA Women's World Cup with England. She also played in the 2007 China Cup against the United States, Germany and China where she was named the player of the tournament. Smith was voted third in the 2009 FIFA Women's World Player of the Year, fourth in 2007 and fifth in 2006 and 2008.

Smith reportedly became England's all-time record goalscorer in September 2010, when she scored her 41st international goal against Switzerland.

In 2011, Smith competed in the FIFA World Cup, where she scored from the spot in England's quarterfinal match with France, to give England a 1–0 lead in the penalty shootout (England would go on to lose the shootout 4–3). Smith, hindered by an achilles injury, was dissatisfied with her own performances at the tournament: "I have to acknowledge that I didn't play well and I have to live with that." She returned to the England squad for a UEFA Women's Euro 2013 qualifying tie with Serbia after missing the first three matches of the campaign.

On 3 February 2015, Smith announced her retirement from international duty.

She was allotted 108 when the FA announced their legacy numbers scheme to honour the 50th anniversary of England’s inaugural international.

=== Great Britain Olympic ===
In June 2012 Smith was named in the 18–player Great Britain squad for the 2012 London Olympics. Smith incurred a minor injury in the 1–0 group stage win over Brazil at Wembley Stadium, and was unable to join Team GB in their quarter final defeat by Canada.

== Television broadcast ==
Smith made her television debut on FOX Sports in December 2014, and provided commentary for 2018 FIFA World Cup.

In April 2021, Smith joined fellow British Olympians Nicola Adams and Greg Rutherford, and fitness instructor Mr Motivator in launching the ‘Energy Fit for the Future’ campaign by Smart Energy GB, which aimed at encouraging people to install smart meters in their homes.

== Coaching career ==
In March 2023, it was announced that Kelly would return to Arsenal to coach at the Women's academy whilst earning her UEFA A Licence coaching badge. In April 2023, it was announced that Kelly had joined the Arsenal Women's first-team coaching setup until the end of the 2022/23 season.

== Personal life ==
Smith studied at Francis Combe School and Community College in Watford.

She has spoken about her previous alcohol addiction which included treatment at The Priory and Sporting Chance Clinic.

Smith used to share a house with England, Arsenal and Boston Breakers teammate Alex Scott. In Scott's 2022 autobiography, she revealed that she and Smith had previously been in a romantic relationship.

In June 2016 she married management consultant DeAnna Dobosz. She gave birth to their son in May 2017. On 1 August 2019, Smith gave birth to their second child, a daughter.

== Honours ==
Smith was appointed Member of the Order of the British Empire (MBE) in the 2008 Birthday Honours.

Arsenal

- Premier League: 1996–97, 2003–04, 2005–06, 2006–07, 2007–08
- FA Cup: 2005–06, 2006–07, 2007–08, 2013–14, 2015–16
- Premier League Cup: 2006–07
- FA Community Shield: 2005, 2006, 2008
- UEFA Women's Cup: 2006–07

England

- Cyprus Cup: 2009
- UEFA Women's Championship runner-up: 2009

Individual

- Women's Super League Hall of Fame: 2021
