= 2009 FIFA World Player of the Year =

Association football award

The 2009 FIFA World Player of the Year awards took place on 21 December 2009 at the Kongresshaus Zürich, Zürich, Switzerland. Shortlists of 23 men and 10 women were announced on 30 October 2009. The final five contenders for this year's FIFA World Player of the Year and FIFA Women's World Player of the Year awards were announced on 7 December 2009. Lionel Messi was announced as the World Player of the Year with a record points total.

== Results ==
=== Men ===
Rank	Player	Points	Club(s)
1	(Argentina) Lionel Messi	1073	(Spain) Barcelona
2	(Portugal) Cristiano Ronaldo	352	(England) Manchester United (Spain) Real Madrid
3	(Spain) Xavi	196	(Spain) Barcelona
4	(Brazil) Kaká	190	(Italy) Milan (Spain) Real Madrid
5	(Spain) Andrés Iniesta	134	(Spain) Barcelona
6	(Ivory Coast) Didier Drogba	128	(England) Chelsea
7	(Spain) Fernando Torres	113	(England) Liverpool
8	(England) Steven Gerrard	64	(England) Liverpool
9	(Cameroon) Samuel Eto'o	54	(Spain) Barcelona (Italy) Internazionale
10	(England) Wayne Rooney	45	(England) Manchester United
11	(England) Frank Lampard	31	(England) Chelsea
12=	(Germany) Michael Ballack	27	(England) Chelsea
12=	(England) John Terry	27	(England) Chelsea
14	(Sweden) Zlatan Ibrahimović	22	(Italy) Internazionale (Spain) Barcelona
15=	(Italy) Gianluigi Buffon	19	(Italy) Juventus
15=	(Ghana) Michael Essien	19	(England) Chelsea
17	(Spain) Iker Casillas	17	(Spain) Real Madrid
18	(Spain) Carles Puyol	14	(Spain) Barcelona
19=	(Brazil) Diego	8	(Germany) Werder Bremen (Italy) Juventus
19=	(Spain) David Villa	8	(Spain) Valencia
21	(France) Franck Ribéry	7	(Germany) Bayern Munich
22	(France) Thierry Henry	6	(Spain) Barcelona
23	(Brazil) Luís Fabiano	2	(Spain) Sevilla

=== Women ===
Rank	Player	Points	Club(s)
1	(Brazil) Marta	833	(United States) Los Angeles Sol (Brazil) Santos
2	(Germany) Birgit Prinz	290	(Germany) Frankfurt
3	(England) Kelly Smith	252	(United States) Boston Breakers
4	(Brazil) Cristiane	239	(United States) Chicago Red Stars (Brazil) Santos
5	(Germany) Inka Grings	216	(Germany) Duisburg

==== Shortlist of 10 players ====
- (Germany) Nadine Angerer
- (France) Sonia Bompastor
- (Brazil) Cristiane
- (Germany) Inka Grings
- (Japan) Mana Iwabuchi
- (Germany) Simone Laudehr
- (Brazil) Marta
- (Germany) Birgit Prinz
- (England) Kelly Smith
- (United States) Abby Wambach
