= 2005 FIFA World Player of the Year =

Association football award

The 2005 FIFA World Player of the Year prize was awarded to the Brazilian Ronaldinho for the second year in succession, also claiming the highest point total ever, surpassing Rivaldo. He finished ahead of Chelsea midfielder Frank Lampard and his Barcelona teammate Samuel Eto'o in the final round of voting. It was the award's 15th edition. The award ceremony took place on the evening of December 19, 2005, and was held at the Zurich Opera House in Zurich, Switzerland. There were 156 coaches and 145 captains selected for the voting process, totaling 301 votes.

Birgit Prinz won the women's award for the third time in a row. For the women's side, there were 134 coaches and 127 captains selected for the voting process, totaling 261 votes.

== Results ==
=== Men ===
Rank	Name	Team	Country	Points
1	Ronaldinho	(Spain) Barcelona	Brazil	956
2	Frank Lampard	(England) Chelsea	England	306
3	Samuel Eto'o	(Spain) Barcelona	Cameroon	190
4	Thierry Henry	(England) Arsenal	France	172
5	Adriano	(Italy) Inter Milan	Brazil	170
6	Andriy Shevchenko	(Italy) Milan	Ukraine	153
7	Steven Gerrard	(England) Liverpool F.C.	England	131
8	Kaká	(Italy) Milan	Brazil	101
9	Paolo Maldini	(Italy) Milan	Italy	76
10	Didier Drogba	(England) Chelsea	Ivory Coast	56
11	Michael Ballack	(Germany) Bayern Munich	Germany	64
12	Ronaldo	(Spain) Real Madrid	Brazil	63
13	Zinedine Zidane	(Spain) Real Madrid	France	55
14	Zlatan Ibrahimović	(Italy) Juventus	Sweden	36
15	Deco	(Spain) Barcelona	Portugal	24
16	Juan Román Riquelme	(Spain) Villarreal	Argentina	20
17	Robinho	(Brazil) Santos (Spain) Real Madrid	Brazil	19
18	David Beckham	(Spain) Real Madrid	England	17
18=	Wayne Rooney	(England) Manchester United	England	17
20	Cristiano Ronaldo	(England) Manchester United	Portugal	13
21	Ruud van Nistelrooy	(England) Manchester United	Netherlands	11
21=	Michael Essien	(France) Lyon (England) Chelsea	Ghana	11
23	Raúl	(Spain) Real Madrid	Spain	8
23=	Pavel Nedvěd	(Italy) Juventus	Czech Republic	8
25	Arjen Robben	(England) Chelsea	Netherlands	5
26	Cafu	(Italy) Milan	Brazil	3
26=	Jay-Jay Okocha	(England) Bolton Wanderers	Nigeria	3
26=	Roberto Carlos	(Spain) Real Madrid	Brazil	3
26=	Alessandro Nesta	(Italy) Milan	Italy	3
30	Gianluigi Buffon	(Italy) Juventus	Italy	1

=== Women ===
Rank	Player	Club	Points
1	(Germany) Birgit Prinz	(Germany) FFC Frankfurt	513
2	(Brazil) Marta	(Sweden) Umeå IK	429
3	(United States) Shannon Boxx	(United States) Ajax Los Angeles	235
4	(Sweden) Hanna Ljungberg	(Sweden) Umeå IK	206
5	(Germany) Renate Lingor	(Germany) FFC Frankfurt	170
6	(Mexico) Maribel Domínguez	(United States) Atlanta Beat (Spain) FC Barcelona	115
7	(Norway) Solveig Gulbrandsen	(Norway) Kolbotn	97
7	(Germany) Sandra Minnert	(Germany) SC Bad Neuenahr	97
9	(United States) Christie Welsh	(France) Lyon (United States) New Jersey Wildcats	78
10	(England) Kelly Smith	(England) Arsenal L.F.C.	60
11	(Sweden) Malin Moström	(Sweden) Umeå IK	N/A
12	(France) Laura Georges	(France) Lyon	N/A
13	(Nigeria) Perpetua Nkwocha	(Sweden) Sunnanå SK	N/A
