= 2007 FIFA World Player of the Year =

Association football award

Brazilian midfielder Kaká won the 2007 FIFA World Player of the Year award, while another Brazilian, Marta, took home the women's award. The winners were announced at the FIFA World Player Gala held at the Zurich Opera House on December 17, 2007.

== Results ==
=== Men ===
Rank	Player	Points	Club(s)
1	(Brazil) Kaká	1047	(Italy) Milan
2	(Argentina) Lionel Messi	504	(Spain) Barcelona
3	(Portugal) Cristiano Ronaldo	426	(England) Manchester United
4	(Ivory Coast) Didier Drogba	209	(England) Chelsea
5	(Brazil) Ronaldinho	109	(Spain) Barcelona
6	(England) Steven Gerrard	68	(England) Liverpool
7	(Italy) Andrea Pirlo	57	(Italy) Milan
8	(France) Thierry Henry	54	(England) Arsenal (Spain) Barcelona
9	(Italy) Fabio Cannavaro	47	(Spain) Real Madrid
10	(Italy) Gianluigi Buffon	31	(Italy) Juventus
11	(France) Franck Ribéry	30	(France) Marseille (Germany) Bayern Munich
12	(Cameroon) Samuel Eto'o	29	(Spain) Barcelona
13	(England) Wayne Rooney	22	(England) Manchester United
14	(Germany) Miroslav Klose	21	(Germany) Werder Bremen (Germany) Bayern Munich
15	(Ghana) Michael Essien	20	(England) Chelsea
16	(Argentina) Juan Román Riquelme	19	(Argentina) Boca Juniors (Spain) Villarreal
17	(Czech Republic) Petr Čech	18	(England) Chelsea
17=	(Netherlands) Ruud van Nistelrooy	18	(Spain) Real Madrid
19	(England) Frank Lampard	11	(England) Chelsea
20	(Portugal) Deco	9	(Spain) Barcelona
20=	(Brazil) Juninho	9	(France) Lyon
22	(Italy) Gennaro Gattuso	8	(Italy) Milan
23	(England) John Terry	6	(England) Chelsea
23=	(France) Patrick Vieira	6	(Italy) Internazionale
25	(Mexico) Rafael Márquez	5	(Spain) Barcelona
26	(Spain) Fernando Torres	4	(Spain) Atlético Madrid (England) Liverpool
27	(Italy) Alessandro Nesta	2	(Italy) Milan
28	(Argentina) Carlos Tevez	1	(England) West Ham United (England) Manchester United
29	(Germany) Philipp Lahm	0	(Germany) Bayern Munich
29=	(France) Lilian Thuram	0	(Spain) Barcelona

=== Women ===
Rank	Player	Points	Club(s)
1	(Brazil) Marta	988	(Sweden) Umeå
2	(Germany) Birgit Prinz	507	(Germany) Frankfurt
3	(Brazil) Cristiane	150	(Germany) Wolfsburg
4	(England) Kelly Smith	110	(England) Arsenal
5	(United States) Abby Wambach	92	United States
6	(Germany) Nadine Angerer	83	(Germany) Turbine Potsdam
7	(United States) Kristine Lilly	82	United States
8	(Brazil) Daniela	72	(Brazil) Saad
9	(Germany) Renate Lingor	62	(Germany) Frankfurt
10	(Germany) Ariane Hingst	41	(Sweden) Djurgårdens IF Dam
