= Ronaldo (Brazilian footballer) =

Brazilian footballer (born 1976)

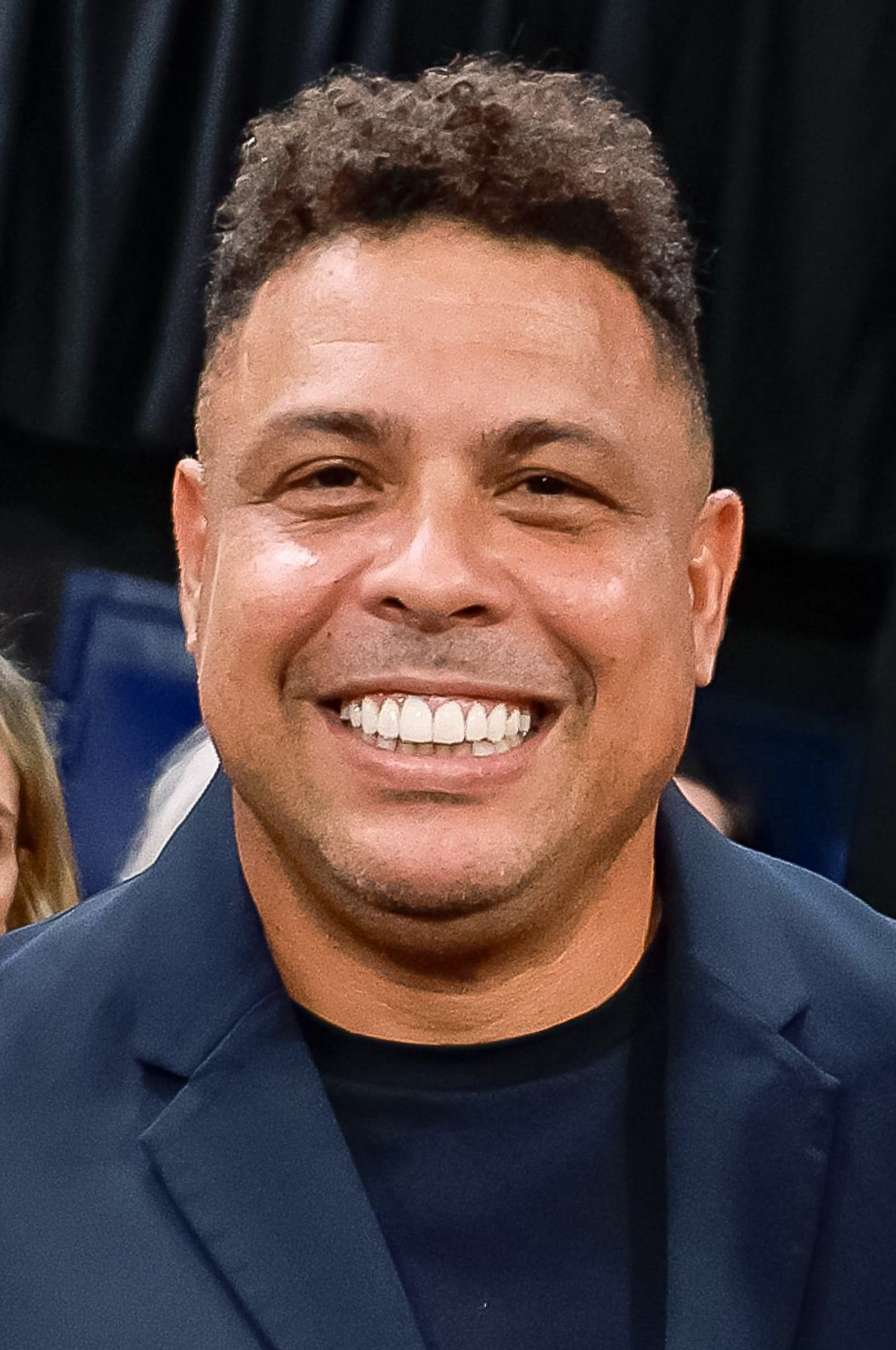
- Ronaldo in 2025

Personal information
- Full name: Ronaldo Luís Nazário de Lima
- Date of birth: 18 September 1976 (age 50)
- Place of birth: Itaguaí, Rio de Janeiro, Brazil
- Height: 1.83 m (6 ft 0 in)
- Position: Striker

Youth career
- 1990–1993: São Cristóvão

Senior career*
Years	Team	Apps	(Gls)
1993–1994	Cruzeiro	34	(34)
1994–1996	PSV	46	(42)
1996–1997	Barcelona	37	(34)
1997–2002	Inter Milan	68	(49)
2002–2007	Real Madrid	127	(83)
2007–2008	AC Milan	20	(9)
2009–2011	Corinthians	52	(29)
Total		384	(280)

International career
1993	Brazil U17	7	(5)
1996	Brazil U23	8	(6)
1994–2011	Brazil	98	(62)
Medal record
Men's football
Representing Brazil
FIFA World Cup
Winner	1994 United States
Winner	2002 Korea/Japan
Runner-up	1998 France
FIFA Confederations Cup
Winner	1997 Saudi Arabia
Copa América
Winner	1997 Bolivia
Winner	1999 Paraguay
Runner-up	1995 Uruguay
Olympic Games
Bronze medal – third place	1996 Atlanta	Team
- * Club domestic league appearances and goals

Ronaldo Luís Nazário de Lima (Brazilian Portuguese: [ʁoˈnawdu luˈiz‿naˈzaɾju dʒi ˈlimɐ]; born 18 September 1976), mononymously known as Ronaldo, is a Brazilian former professional footballer who played as a striker. He is the former owner and president of Segunda División club Real Valladolid. Nicknamed O Fenômeno and R9, he is widely regarded as one of the greatest players of all time. As a multi-functional striker who brought a new dimension to the position, Ronaldo has been an influence for the following generation of strikers. His individual accolades include being named FIFA World Player of the Year three times and winning two Ballon d'Or awards.

Ronaldo started his career at Cruzeiro and moved to PSV in 1994. He joined Barcelona in 1996 for a then world record transfer fee and at 20 years old, he was named the 1996 FIFA World Player of the Year, making him the youngest recipient of the award. In 1997, Inter Milan broke the world record fee to sign Ronaldo, making him the first player since Diego Maradona to break the world transfer record twice. At 21, he received the 1997 Ballon d'Or and remains the youngest recipient of the award. By the age of 23, Ronaldo had scored over 200 goals for club and country. However, after a series of knee injuries and recuperation, he was inactive for almost three years. Ronaldo joined Real Madrid in 2002 and won the 2002–03 La Liga title. He had spells at AC Milan and Corinthians before retiring in 2011, having suffered further injuries.

Ronaldo played for Brazil in 98 matches, scoring 62 goals and is the third-highest goalscorer for his national team. At age 17, he was the youngest member of the Brazilian squad that won the 1994 FIFA World Cup. At the 1998 FIFA World Cup, Ronaldo received the Golden Ball as the player of the tournament after he helped Brazil reach the final, where he suffered a convulsive fit hours before kick-off. He won the 2002 FIFA World Cup, starring in a front three with Ronaldinho and Rivaldo. Ronaldo scored twice in the final and received the Golden Boot as the tournament's top goalscorer. This achievement, viewed as "redemption" for what occurred at the previous World Cup, saw Ronaldo named the 2002 FIFA World Player of the Year, receive the 2002 Ballon d'Or, and for his return from injury, won the Laureus World Sports Award for Comeback of the Year. At the 2006 FIFA World Cup, Ronaldo scored his 15th World Cup goal, a tournament record at the time. He also won the 1997 Copa América, where he became the player of the tournament and the 1999 Copa América, where he was the top goalscorer.

Ronaldo was one of the most marketable sportsmen in the world during his playing career. He was named in the FIFA 100 list of the greatest living players compiled in 2004 by Pelé and was inducted into the Brazilian Football Museum Hall of Fame, Italian Football Hall of Fame, Inter Milan Hall of Fame and Real Madrid Hall of Fame. In 2020, Ronaldo was named in the Ballon d'Or Dream Team, a greatest all-time XI published by France Football magazine. Ronaldo has continued his work as a United Nations Development Programme Goodwill Ambassador, a position to which he was appointed in 2000. Ronaldo became the majority owner of Real Valladolid in September 2018, after buying 51% of the club's shares. In December 2021, he bought a controlling stake in his boyhood club Cruzeiro, and invested $70 million in the club. He sold his stake in Cruzeiro in April 2024.

== Early life ==
Ronaldo Luís Nazário de Lima was born on 18 September 1976 in Itaguaí as the third child of Nélio Nazário de Lima Sr. and Sônia dos Santos Barata. Ronaldo has a brother, Nélio Jr. His parents separated when he was 11, and Ronaldo dropped out of school shortly afterward to pursue a career in football. He played on the streets of Bento Ribeiro, a suburb of Rio de Janeiro. His mother states: "I always found him on the street playing ball with friends when he should have been in school. I know, I lost my battle." His first futsal team was Valqueire Tenis Clube, and then he joined the Social Ramos futsal team at the age of twelve leading the city's youth league in scoring with a record 166 goals in his first season which included scoring 11 of his team's 12 goals in a single game. Crediting futsal for developing his skills, Ronaldo has said, "futsal will always be my first love." His coach from Social Ramos, Alirio Carvalho, says: "What was special about Ronaldo was his attitude. It was as if he had come from the moon. Nothing disturbed him, nothing overawed him, nothing threw him off his game."

Spotted by former Brazilian player Jairzinho, who was coaching São Cristóvão, Ronaldo played for the São Cristóvão youth team. Under the guidance of coach Alfredo Sampaio, he progressed quickly through the ranks, playing for the clubs' under-17 and under-20 teams while only 15. Ronaldo's agents in Brazil, Reinaldo Pitta and Alexandre Martins, signed him as a 13-year-old. Pitta stated: "We saw right away that he could be something different than most other players." Recognized as a child prodigy, Jairzinho recommended the then 16-year-old to his former club Cruzeiro.

== Club career ==
=== Cruzeiro ===
Ronaldo quickly attracted attention from big clubs, and his agents rejected offers from Botafogo and São Paulo. He was turned down by Flamengo, the team he supported as a boy, after missing practice due to an inability to afford the fare for the hour-long bus ride. Jairzinho saw Ronaldo's potential and helped get him a move to Cruzeiro. Ronaldo's agents accepted an offer of €50,000 from the club, and he scored four goals on his youth team debut.

Three months after arriving at Cruzeiro, Ronaldo made his professional debut on 25 May 1993 against Caldense in the Minas Gerais State Championship. His first senior goal came in a friendly during a tour of Portugal, scoring a goal against Belenenses and generally impressing new coach Carlos Alberto Silva, enough to become a first team regular. During the tour, his performance against Porto impressed enough that they bid $500,000, which was turned down by club president César Masci.

Upon returning from the 1993 summer tour, he would score 20 goals in 21 games for Cruzeiro until the end of the year. On 5 October 1993 he scored his first senior career hat-trick against Chilean side Colo-Colo (6–1) in the first home leg of the Supercopa Libertadores. He scored two more in the second leg, further three against Uruguayan team Nacional, and finished as the tournament's top-scorer with 8 goals, being the youngest to do so in the history of the Supercopa Libertadores. On 7 November 1993 he came to national public attention once more by scoring five goals in Cruzeiro's 6–0 home win against Bahia in the 1993 Campeonato Brasileiro Série A and became the second youngest South-American in history to score a league hat-trick behind Pelé. Ronaldo scored a total of 44 goals in 47 games with Cruzeiro in two seasons, leading them to their first Copa do Brasil in 1993, and the Minas Gerais State Championship in 1994.

=== PSV ===
Ronaldo joined PSV after the 1994 World Cup. He was selected for the tournament despite being just 17, but did not play in any games. His Brazil teammate Romário, having played for PSV from 1988 to 1993, advised Ronaldo to move to the club. On 28 August 1994, Ronaldo scored ten minutes into his debut against Vitesse, and scored a brace on his home debut against Go Ahead Eagles. He scored 30 league goals in his first season in the Netherlands, which included seven braces and a hat-trick against Utrecht. After scoring a hat-trick in PSV's game against Bayer Leverkusen in the 1994–95 UEFA Cup, Leverkusen striker and Germany World Cup winner Rudi Völler stated in a post match press conference, "Never in my life have I seen an 18-year-old play in this way." His dribbles from midfield caught the attention of many in the sport, with future Barcelona teammate Luis Enrique stating, "I'd seen him on television at PSV and thought ‘wow'. Then he came to Barcelona. He's the most spectacular player I've ever seen. He did things I'd never seen before. We're now used to seeing Messi dribble past six players, but not then. Ronaldo was a beast."

Nick Miller, match reporter for The Guardian, writes: "What's striking about Ronaldo in that first year at PSV is how complete he looks, even as a skinny teenager. Everything that would come to define him – the lightning pace, the blurry stepovers, the implausible impression that he was faster with the ball than without it, even the exceptional upper-body strength – was all there." Rob Smyth added, "In many ways Ronaldo was the first PlayStation footballer. His stepover was a form of hypnosis, and his signature trick, the elastico, could certainly have come from a computer screen." Ronaldo's second season was marred by a knee injury which kept him out of most of the campaign, but he still averaged nearly a goal a game, scoring 19 goals in 21 appearances, including a UEFA Cup four-goal haul against Finnish side MyPa. With PSV, Ronaldo won the Dutch Cup in 1996 and he was Eredivisie top scorer in 1995. In his two seasons at the club he scored 54 goals in 58 games. Ronaldo occasionally names Luc Nilis as one of the best strike partners he had played with, despite sharing only a brief time with him at PSV.

=== Barcelona ===
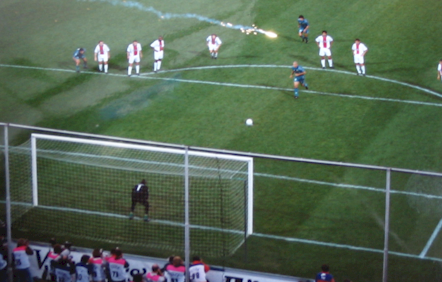
Ronaldo scoring the winning penalty for Barcelona in the 1997 UEFA Cup Winners' Cup Final against Paris Saint-Germain

During his spell at PSV, Ronaldo attracted the attention of both Inter Milan and Barcelona. It was Barcelona that was willing to pay the then-world record fee of $19.5 million, and he joined the club on 17 July 1996. According to manager Bobby Robson, he signed an eight-year contract, and would play up front alone.

During the 1996–97 season, Ronaldo scored 47 goals in 49 games in all competitions, with his goal celebration invariably the same with his arms outstretched like the statue of Christ the Redeemer that watches over his native Rio de Janeiro. He helped Barcelona to the 1996–97 UEFA Cup Winners' Cup title, capping the season with the winning goal in the final, and to a win in the 1996 Supercopa de España. He also won La Liga top scorer award in 1997 with 34 goals in 37 games, and the European Golden Shoe. Until the 2008–09 season, Ronaldo remained the last player to score more than 30 goals in La Liga.

Ronaldo was at his physical peak at Barcelona, and many of his 47 goals involved him rounding the goalkeeper before slotting the ball into the net. By January 1997, at 20 years old, he was touted to be the next "great" in football, being viewed as the heir to Pelé, Diego Maradona, Johan Cruyff and Marco van Basten. Speaking to The New York Times regarding Ronaldo later that season, Robson said "I don't think I've ever seen a player at 20 have so much". World Soccer featured Ronaldo on its cover in the same year under the headline 'The Best Ever?'. Óscar García, Ronaldo's teammate that season, stated, "Back then, he was all fibre and muscle. He was a perfect physical specimen. Such incredible power matched to his technical skills could make him unstoppable." José Mourinho, who worked as an interpreter at Barcelona, referred to Ronaldo as "the greatest player I have ever seen in my life", adding, "I have no doubts. Ronaldo is the best my eyes have seen", and in 2014 regarded him as the best player post-Diego Maradona.

Arguably, Ronaldo's most memorable Barcelona goal was scored at Compostela on 11 October 1996; having received the ball inside his own half, he evaded a cynical tackle of the first opponent with a drag back, before running away from another and ran towards goal, going past two more defenders in the box with close ball control, before finishing into the bottom corner of the net. The camera then cut to manager Robson who had got up off the bench and clasped his head in disbelief at what he had seen. The footage of the goal was later used in a Nike advert with a voiceover asking: "Imagine you asked God to be the best player in the world, and he listened to you", and the goal was said to have been replayed 160 times on the main Spanish television channels in the 48 hours following the game. Half-way through the season, Barcelona agreed in principle to extend his contract to 2006, doubling his salary in the process. A hat-trick against Valencia, the third goal of which saw him dissect two Valencia defenders before striking the ball into the net, saw Barcelona fans waving white handkerchiefs as an expression of admiration for an exceptional performance. Sid Lowe of Sports Illustrated stated: "That season Ronaldo was unstoppable. He was slim and powerful, skillful, fast and deadly. He was ridiculously good." At the end of 1996, aged 20, Ronaldo became the youngest player to win FIFA World Player of the Year.

=== Inter Milan ===
==== 1997–1999: World record transfer and Ballon d'Or win ====
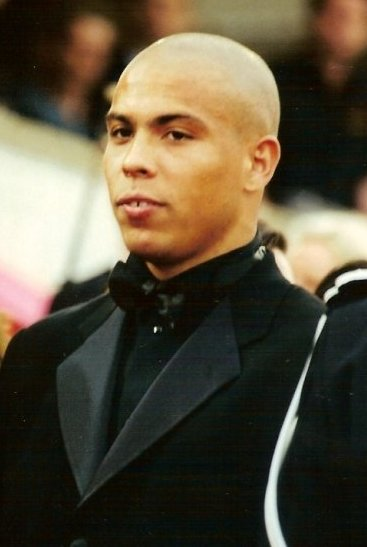
Ronaldo at the 1999 Cannes Film Festival

Ronaldo's time at Barcelona lasted one season, as there were problems with the renegotiation of his contract. Barcelona thought there was an agreement in place, with Barcelona president Josep Lluís Núñez saying "He's ours for life", but when the parties reconvened the following day, the agreement collapsed, with Núñez admitting: "It's all over, Ronaldo is going". Speaking to ESPN, Ronaldo stated, "I had reached an agreement to renew my contract just a month before that season finished, but a week later the lawyer and the president of Barcelona agreed that that contract was absurd." Paying the buy out clause fee in his contract, Inter Milan signed him in the summer of 1997 for a then world record fee of $27 million, making him the second player, after Diego Maradona, to break the world transfer record twice. He signed a five-year contract with the Italians, and was unveiled to 4,000 Inter fans at their training ground. His debut came on 27 July during the pre-season fixture against Manchester United. His competitive debut came on the opening day of the 1997–98 season against Brescia.

Ronaldo became popular and was dubbed "the phenomenon" for the first time by Italians (il fenomeno). He adapted to the Italian style of the game in his first season, finishing with 25 Serie A goals, and was named Serie A Footballer of the Year. Ronaldo started to develop into a complete forward. He began racking up assists, became first-choice penalty taker, taking and scoring freekicks. Halfway through his first season he won FIFA World Player of the Year for the second time, and collected the Ballon d'Or. During his time with Inter, he scored several goals against city rivals AC Milan in the Derby della Madonnina. Ronaldo and prolific Fiorentina striker Gabriel Batistuta were the two best strikers in Serie A, with their duels the most anticipated in Italy. Ronaldo's goal celebrations often saw his Inter teammates congratulating him by kneeling down and pretending to shine his shoe. Ronaldo scored a trademark goal against Lazio in the 1998 UEFA Cup Final. Running through defence to go one on one with Lazio goalkeeper Luca Marchegiani, Ronaldo feinted to go right then left, without touching the ball, leaving Marchegiani on his backside, before going right and slotting the ball into the net. His Inter teammate Youri Djorkaeff stated; "Ronaldo was phenomenal. He proved that he was a cut above the rest that season." After the 1998 FIFA World Cup, where he was named player of the tournament, Ronaldo was widely regarded as the best striker in the world. By the end of the 1998–99 season, he was appointed Inter Milan captain.

==== 1999–2002: Recurring injury problems ====
"The knee injuries suffered at Inter Milan took away the explosiveness that made him possibly the greatest young footballer of all time, a futuristic fusion of speed, strength and skill. That is not to belittle Ronaldo's achievements in the second half of his career, when he scored eight goals in a single World Cup [in 2002] and became the first Ronaldo to receive a standing ovation at Old Trafford [in 2003], but it is the memory of the early years that puts mist in the eyes of grown men."

— Rob Smyth, The Guardian.

After two seasons with Inter, A.C. Milan defender Paolo Maldini viewed Ronaldo and Diego Maradona as the two best players he ever faced, stating, "Ronaldo during his first two years at Inter was a phenomenon." Inter had high hopes going into the 1999–2000 season with their attack including Ronaldo and Italian stars Roberto Baggio and Christian Vieri. However, on 21 November 1999, during a Serie A match against Lecce, Ronaldo felt his knee buckle and was forced to limp off the field. A medical examination confirmed that the striker had ruptured a tendon in his knee and would require surgery. During his first comeback on 12 April 2000, he played only six minutes during the first leg of the Coppa Italia final against Lazio before suffering a complete rupture of the knee-cap tendons. Ronaldo's physiotherapist Nilton Petrone stated, "his knee-cap actually exploded", and called it "the worst football injury" he's ever seen.

Ronaldo was forced to miss the entire 2000–01 season and much of the two seasons either side of it. Since his Inter teammate Javier Zanetti had replaced him as the team captain during his absence, he eventually inherited the captain's armband in late 2001. After two operations and rehabilitation, Ronaldo came back for the 2002 World Cup, helping Brazil win their fifth World Cup title. Later in 2002, he won the FIFA World Player of the Year award for the third time, and transferred from Inter to Real Madrid. Ronaldo was given his most recognizable nickname, Il Fenomeno, by the Italian press while playing there. His Inter teammate Djorkaeff stated: "when we were training, we would practically stop to watch him. It was extraordinary." Prior to his November 1999 injury, Ronaldo had registered 42 goals in 58 Serie A games, in what was the hardest league to score in with the most advanced defensive strategies and the world's best defenders. After five years, he had played 99 games and scored 59 goals for Nerazzurri. Ronaldo's performances at the club – especially the first two seasons before injury – saw him named among the four inaugural inductees into the Inter Milan Hall of Fame in 2018.

=== Real Madrid ===
==== 2002–2005: Ballon d'Or win and La Liga championship ====
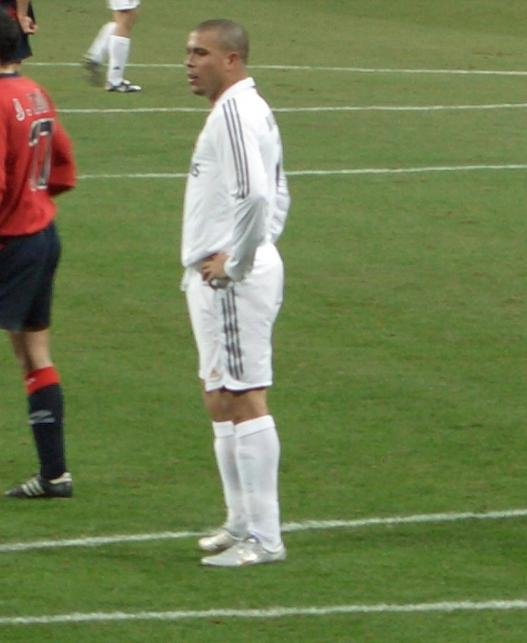
Ronaldo won La Liga in his first season with Real Madrid and received the Pichichi Trophy in his second

Having signed for Real Madrid for €46 million, his jersey sales broke all records on the first day. Ronaldo was part of the Galácticos era of global stars signed by the club every summer, which included Zinedine Zidane, Luís Figo, Roberto Carlos and David Beckham. He was sidelined through injury until October 2002 which further fuelled fan anticipation. Ronaldo scored twice on his debut against Alavés, the first 61 seconds after coming on. That same reception was observed at the final game of the season against Athletic Bilbao, where Ronaldo scored to finish his first season with 23 league goals and seal the La Liga title for 2003. He also won an Intercontinental Cup in 2002 and Supercopa de España in 2003, scoring in both finals.

In the second leg of Real Madrid's Champions League quarter-final, Ronaldo scored a hat-trick against Manchester United at Old Trafford, knocking the English team out of the competition. Completing his hat-trick with a swerving strike from 30 yards, Ronaldo was substituted off after 67 minutes, and was given a standing ovation from both sets of fans. Reflecting on the ovation given to him from the oppositions' fans, Ronaldo stated that "it remains a very beautiful, very special moment". Manchester United defender Wes Brown commented: "He was just unstoppable. A young Ronaldo [before a series of injuries] would have been even more dangerous, but it shows how good a player he was. Whenever he wanted to turn it on he could, on any stage, in any stadium". Ronaldo scored in a 2–1 home win over Juventus in the first leg of the Champions League semi-finals, but injury crucially kept him out of most of the second leg defeat where Real were eliminated.

In the 2003–04 season, Madrid were on track to win the treble, until Ronaldo was injured towards the end of the season; they subsequently lost the Copa del Rey final, were knocked out of the UEFA Champions League quarter-finals to Monaco, and suffered a league form breakdown. During that second season at the club, Ronaldo scored one of the fastest goals in the club's history when he netted after 15 seconds in a league match against Atlético Madrid at the Bernabéu on 3 December 2003. Three days later he helped to ensure Real's first league victory over Barcelona at the Nou Camp in 20 years when he scored the second goal in a 2–1 victory over his former club. He finished the season as La Liga's top scorer with 25 goals and received the Pichichi Trophy for a second time, despite Madrid losing the league title to Valencia.

==== 2005–2007: Final two seasons ====
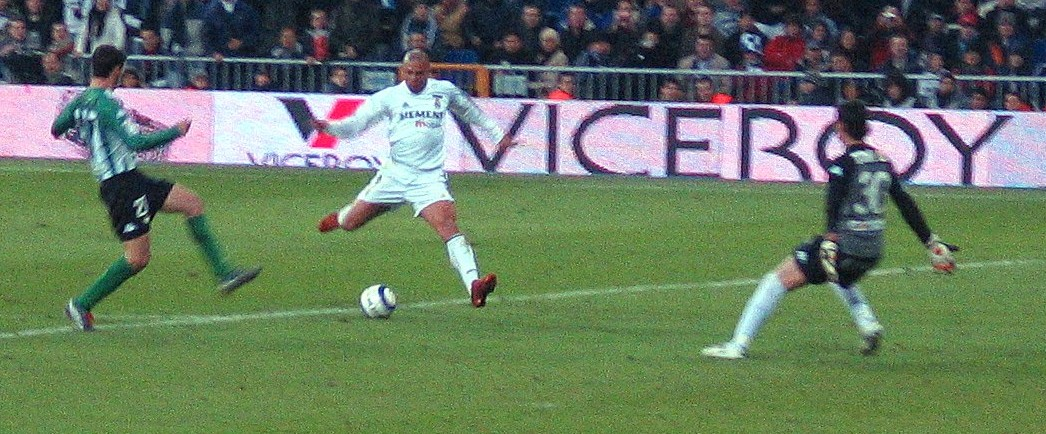
Ronaldo taking a shot for Real Madrid in 2005

In his final two seasons at Real Madrid, Ronaldo missed a number of games with injuries and weight issues, and with the acquisition of Ruud van Nistelrooy in 2006, he grew further out of favour with the manager Fabio Capello. Speaking in 2017 on Ronaldo's weight issues and lack of fitness at Madrid, in addition to his ability, Capello summed up the conflicting emotions he has with the Brazilian: "The most difficult player to handle was the best I coached: Ronaldo, il Fenomeno."

In four and a half seasons at the club, Ronaldo scored over a century of goals, becoming the fifth foreigner at Madrid to achieve the feat after Argentine Alfredo Di Stéfano, Hungarian Ferenc Puskás, Mexican Hugo Sánchez and Chilean Iván Zamorano. Although the knee injuries before 2002 meant he "was robbed of the explosiveness of his early years" (according to FourFourTwo) by the time he signed for Real Madrid, Ronaldo was named by Marca as a member of the "Best foreign eleven in Real Madrid's history".

While past his 1990s prime, Ronaldo still drew praise from his Madrid colleagues, with Zidane stating: "Without hesitation, Ronaldo is the best player I ever played with or against. He had such an ease with the ball. Every day I trained with him, I saw something different, something new, something beautiful." Michael Owen, who joined Madrid in 2004, acknowledged that he never got the chance to play with Ronaldo in his prime when "he had absolute blistering speed and strength, mesmerizing foot speed, he was just a blur, he'd be that fast", before adding, "even in training, he showed more than enough to convince me that I would have loved to play with him at his peak." Teammates for six months, Van Nistelrooy said: "Ronaldo was the best natural talent I ever played with. His innate ability went beyond anything that I'd ever seen or played alongside."

=== AC Milan ===
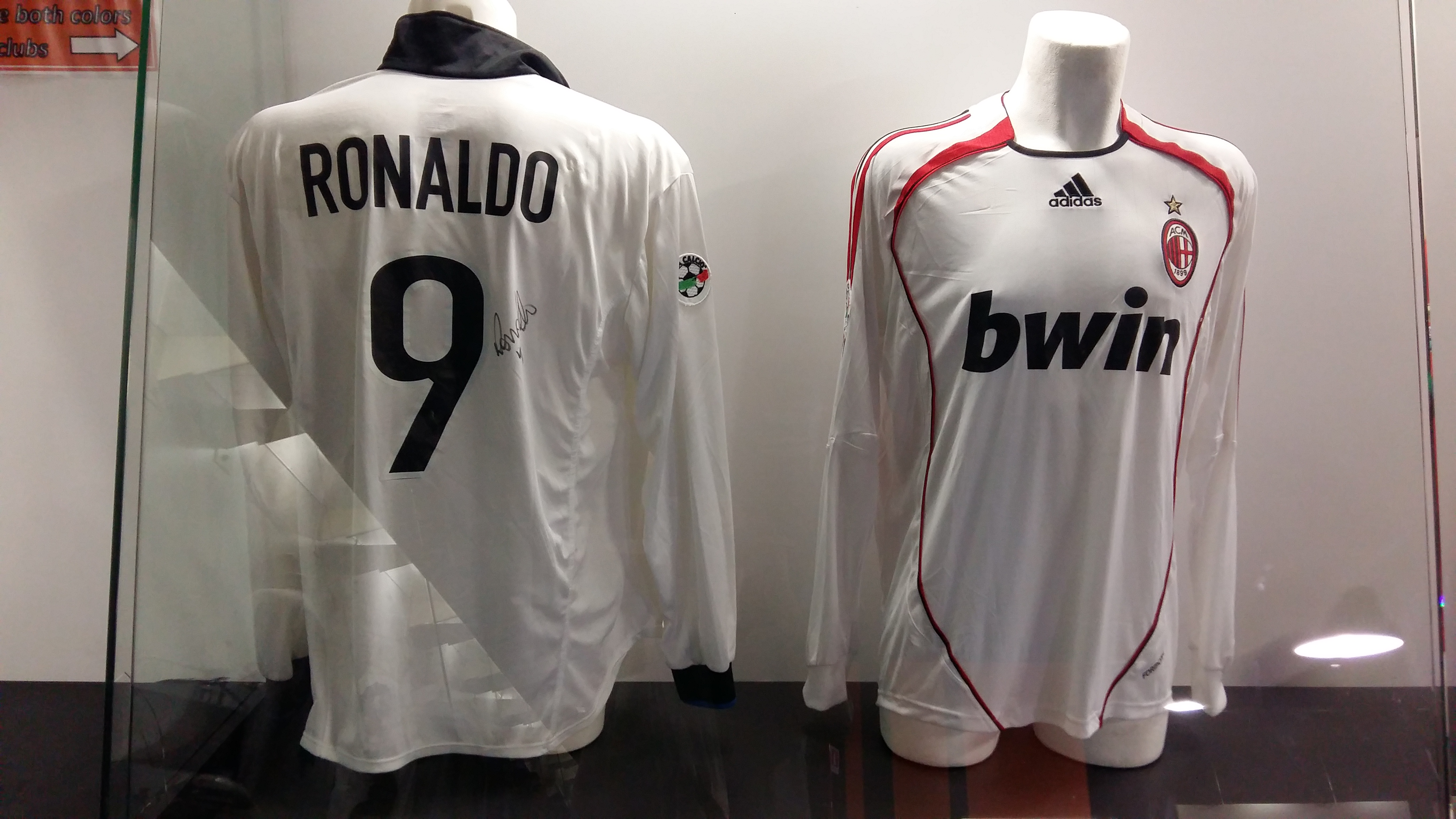
Ronaldo's Inter Milan away jersey (left) and A.C. Milan away jersey (right) in the San Siro museum. He played for Inter from 1997 to 2002, and A.C. Milan from 2007 to 2008.

On 18 January 2007, it was reported that Ronaldo agreed terms with Milan for a transfer of €8.05 million. Departing Real Madrid, having been the club's leading goalscorer for all of his four full seasons, Ronaldo thanked everyone except Capello: "I would like to thank the fans who've supported me all the time and thank all the teammates that I've had here and all the coaches I've had – except one". Capello, who dropped him due to weight issues, commented: "I wish him the best of luck in doing what he used to do which is being a great player." On 25 January, Ronaldo flew from Madrid to Milan, with statements on the club's website stating Ronaldo was in Milan for a medical, and that a meeting had been arranged with Real Madrid officials to discuss and finalize his transfer to the Milanese club. On 26 January, Ronaldo successfully completed his medical tests at the Milanello training complex under the supervision of club doctors, and the transfer was completed on 30 January. Wearing the number 99 jersey, he made his debut as a substitute on 11 February 2007 in the 2–1 victory over Livorno. The next game at Siena, on 17 February, Ronaldo scored twice and assisted on a third goal in his first start for Milan, as they won 4–3. In his first season, Ronaldo scored seven goals in 14 appearances.

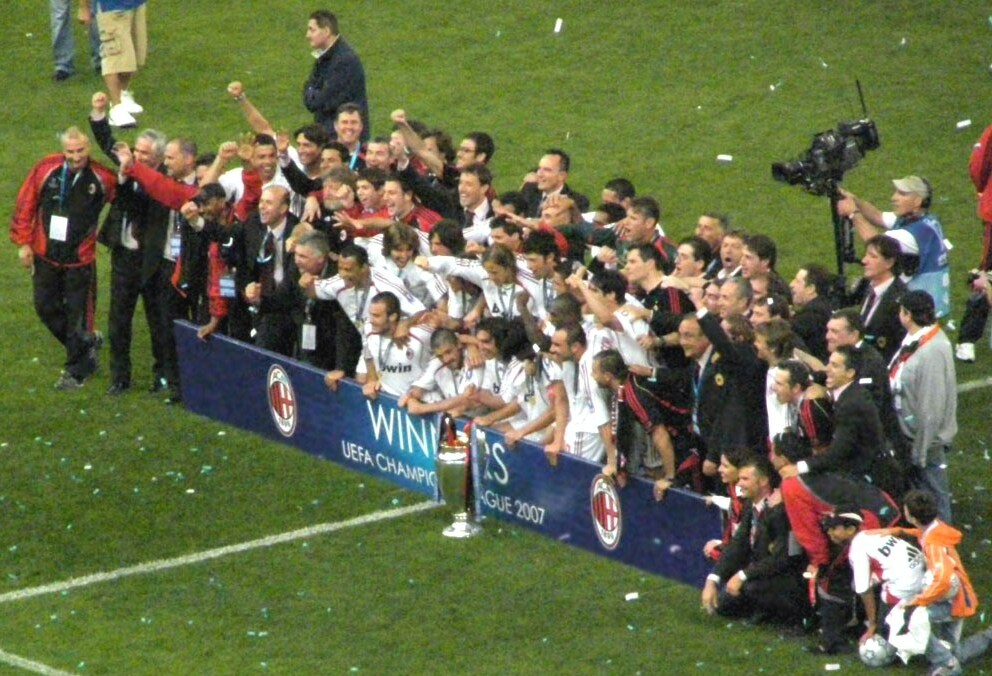
Ineligible to play having signed for the club mid season, Ronaldo (standing sixth from left) celebrated the 2007 UEFA Champions League triumph with his AC Milan teammates.

After his move to Milan, Ronaldo joined the list of the few players to have played for both Inter Milan and AC Milan in the Derby della Madonnina, and is one of few players to have scored for both rival teams in the Milan derby game (for Inter in the 1998–99 season and for AC Milan in the 2006–07 season), the others being players such as Giuseppe Meazza, Zlatan Ibrahimović, Enrico Candiani and Aldo Cevenini. Ronaldo is also one of the few players to have started for Real Madrid and Barcelona, which also boasts a heated rivalry. Ronaldo, however, has never transferred directly between rival clubs. Ronaldo only played 300-plus minutes in his second season at Milan due to recurring injury problems and weight issues. Ronaldo's only goals in the 2007–08 season, besides his goal against Lecce in pre-season, came in a 5–2 victory against Napoli at the San Siro, where he scored an emotional double. It was also the first time Milan's much hyped attacking trio of Kaká, Alexandre Pato and Ronaldo, known as Ka-Pa-Ro, played together.

Despite tremendous success over the past decade, Ronaldo never won the UEFA Champions League in his club career. In 2019, FourFourTwo named him the best player never to win the competition; in 2020, Sky Sports ranked him the second-best player (after Diego Maradona) never to win the Champions League or European Cup. Ronaldo stated: "I live football with a passion that doesn't give me any peace for not winning the Champions League – it's a trophy everyone would love to win." In 2011, Paul Wilson wrote in The Guardian: "Ronaldo was unlucky in his timing or his choice of club – for there is no doubt that at his very best he would have walked into any club in the world." For the 2006–07 season, when AC Milan won the Champions League, Ronaldo was cup-tied with Madrid and ineligible to take part. The closest that he came to Champions League success was in 2003 when he helped Real Madrid to the semi-finals, in which they lost to Juventus.

On 13 February 2008, Ronaldo suffered a severe season-ending knee injury while jumping for a cross in Milan 1–1 draw with Livorno, and was stretchered off and taken to a hospital. The club confirmed after the match that Ronaldo had ruptured the kneecap ligament in his left knee. It marked the third such occurrence of this injury, which he suffered twice to his right knee in 1999 and 2000. Teammate Clarence Seedorf stated: "My heart stopped beating because it was like watching a repeat of the injury he suffered playing for Inter Milan against Lazio [in 2000]. His reaction was the same." Silvio Berlusconi told Italy's RAI TV: "He fears for his career. I called him last evening and told him to believe in himself. He has enormous physical potential." Ronaldo was released by Milan at the end of the season, as his contract expired and was not renewed.

=== Corinthians ===
==== 2009–2010: Paulistão and Copa do Brasil ====
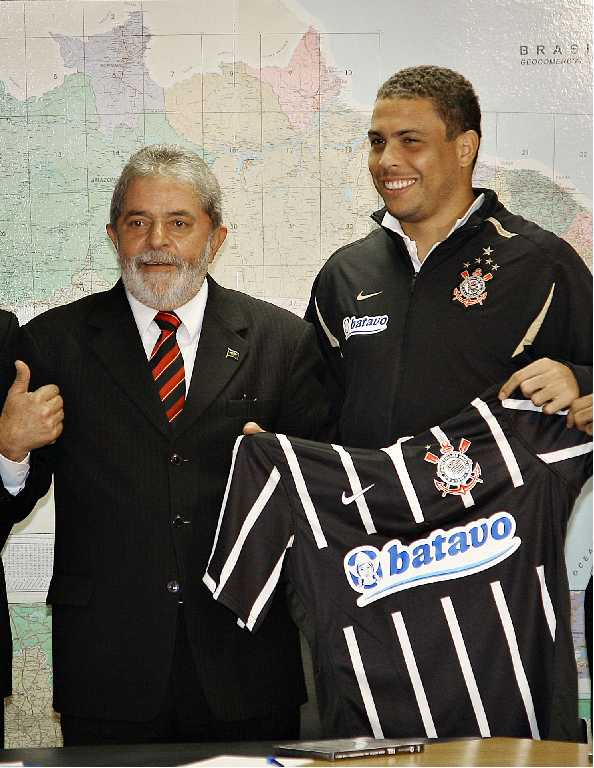
Ronaldo during his Corinthians unveiling in 2009, with Brazil president Lula handing him the jersey

Ronaldo trained with Rio de Janeiro based Brazilian club Flamengo during his recovery from knee surgery, and the club's board of directors said that the doors were open for him to join. On 9 December, however, Ronaldo signed a one-year deal with Flamengo's league rival Corinthians. The announcement received much publicity in the Brazilian press about his choice of Corinthians over Flamengo, since Ronaldo publicly declared himself a Flamengo fan. Rio-based sports newspaper Lance! called Ronaldo a "phenomenal traitor", and some angry fans burned Ronaldo shirts outside the Flamengo headquarters. Ronaldo responded that playing for Corinthians was the only option open to him. "I understand perfectly, I'm openly a Flamengo fan. But I was training with Flamengo for four months and didn't receive any offer. Corinthians made an offer that will let me continue my career."

Ronaldo played his first match for Corinthians on 4 March 2009, a Copa do Brasil match against Itumbiara at Estádio Juscelino Kubitschek, in which he came as a substitute for Jorge Henrique. Ronaldo scored his first goal for Corinthians on 8 March 2009 in a Campeonato Paulista match against Palmeiras. Scoring eight goals in nine matches, his form led to calls for his return to the Brazil national team – nearly 70% of respondents in a poll for the O Globo newspaper voted that he should be reinstated, with the country's president Lula also calling for his immediate return. He scored twice in a 3–1 win against local rivals Santos in the first leg of the state championship final, with Santos idol Pelé looking on from the stands. His second goal, a chip over the Santos goalkeeper from 30 yards out, sent the Corinthians fans into hysteria. Ultimately, he helped Corinthians win the Campeonato Paulista with ten goals in 14 games.

Ronaldo scored in Corinthians 4–2 aggregate defeat of Internacional in the final of the 2009 Copa do Brasil, helping the club win the trophy for the third time (the second of his career), thus earning a spot in the Copa Libertadores 2010. Following an injury lay off he returned on 20 September in a match against Goiás, and a week later scored for Corinthians in a draw against São Paulo. He finished the 2009 Campeonato Brasileiro Série A with 12 goals in 20 matches.

==== 2011: Retirement ====
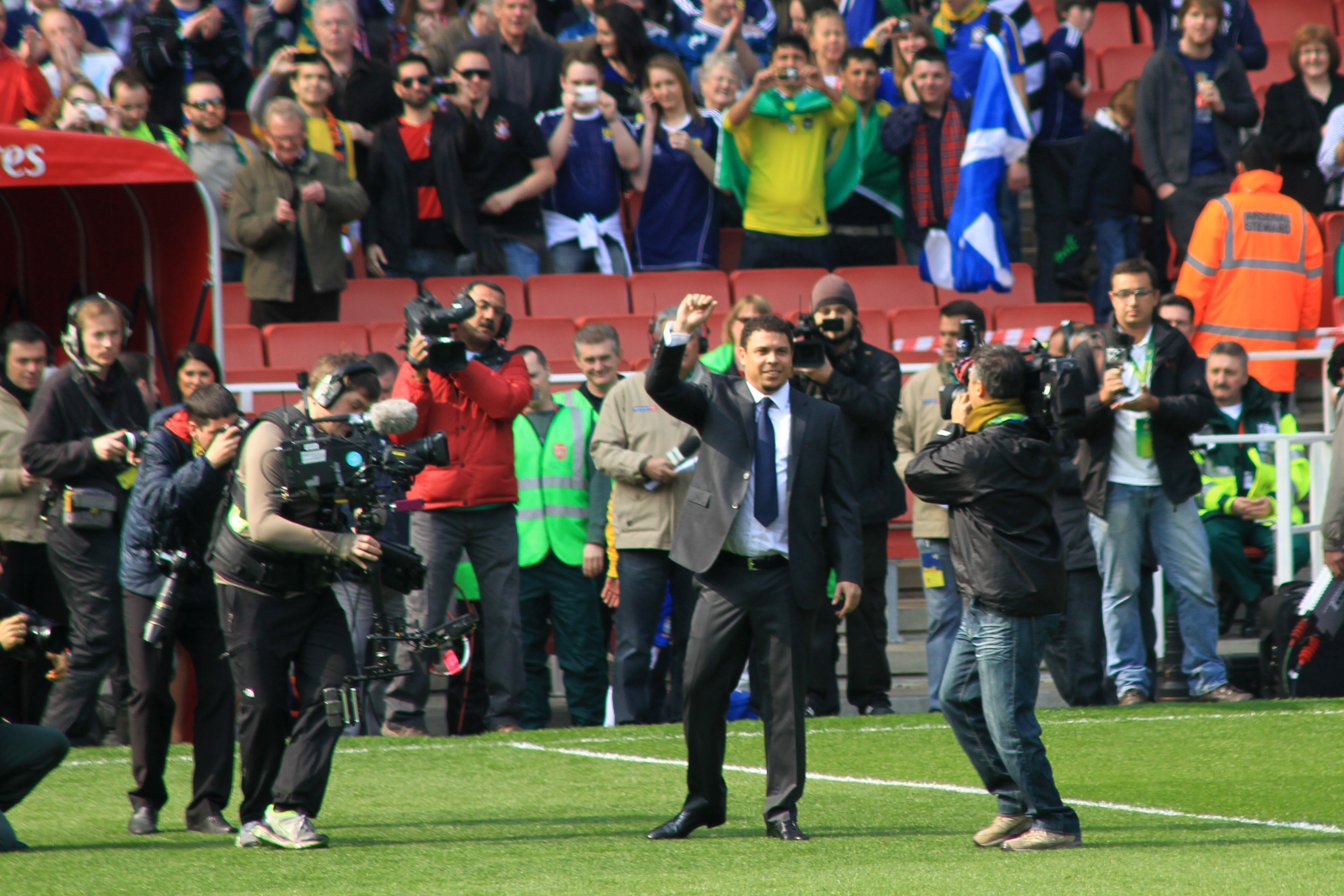
Ronaldo greets fans at the Emirates Stadium in London in March 2011, one month after announcing his retirement

In February 2010, Ronaldo signed a contract extension with Corinthians that would keep him with the club until the end of 2011, and said he would then retire. Commenting on his weight issues following this announcement, Brian Homewood of The Guardian stated: "Sadly, Ronaldo's celebrity is now more of a draw than his skills on the pitch – Coldplay, Israeli prime minister Shimon Peres and actor Hugh Jackman have all visited São Paulo to get a picture with the roly‑poly star."

In February 2011, after Corinthians were eliminated from the 2011 Copa Libertadores by the Colombian team Deportes Tolima, Ronaldo announced his retirement from football, concluding an 18-year career. In an emotional press conference on 14 February, he cited pain and hypothyroidism as the reasons for his premature retirement. He discovered he had hypothyroidism – a condition which slows down metabolism and causes weight gain – during tests with Milan in 2007.

The player said that the problem could be solved by taking hormones, but this practice is forbidden in football and would lead to a suspension for doping. However, doctors disagree that such treatment would be confused with doping, with some publicly claiming that Ronaldo had lied when he said he could not treat his hypothyroidism. Corinthians' own doctor said that Ronaldo did not have this disease. Hypothyroidism is usually associated with a slight weight gain (eminently due to fluid accumulation, not fat gain) and difficulty getting rid of extra pounds.

Ronaldo admitted his body had finally succumbed to the crippling litany of injuries that had blighted his career: "It's very hard to leave something that made me so happy. Mentally I wanted to continue but I have to acknowledge that I lost to my body. The head wants to go on but the body can't take any more. I think of an action but I can't do it the way I want to. It's time to go."

== International career ==
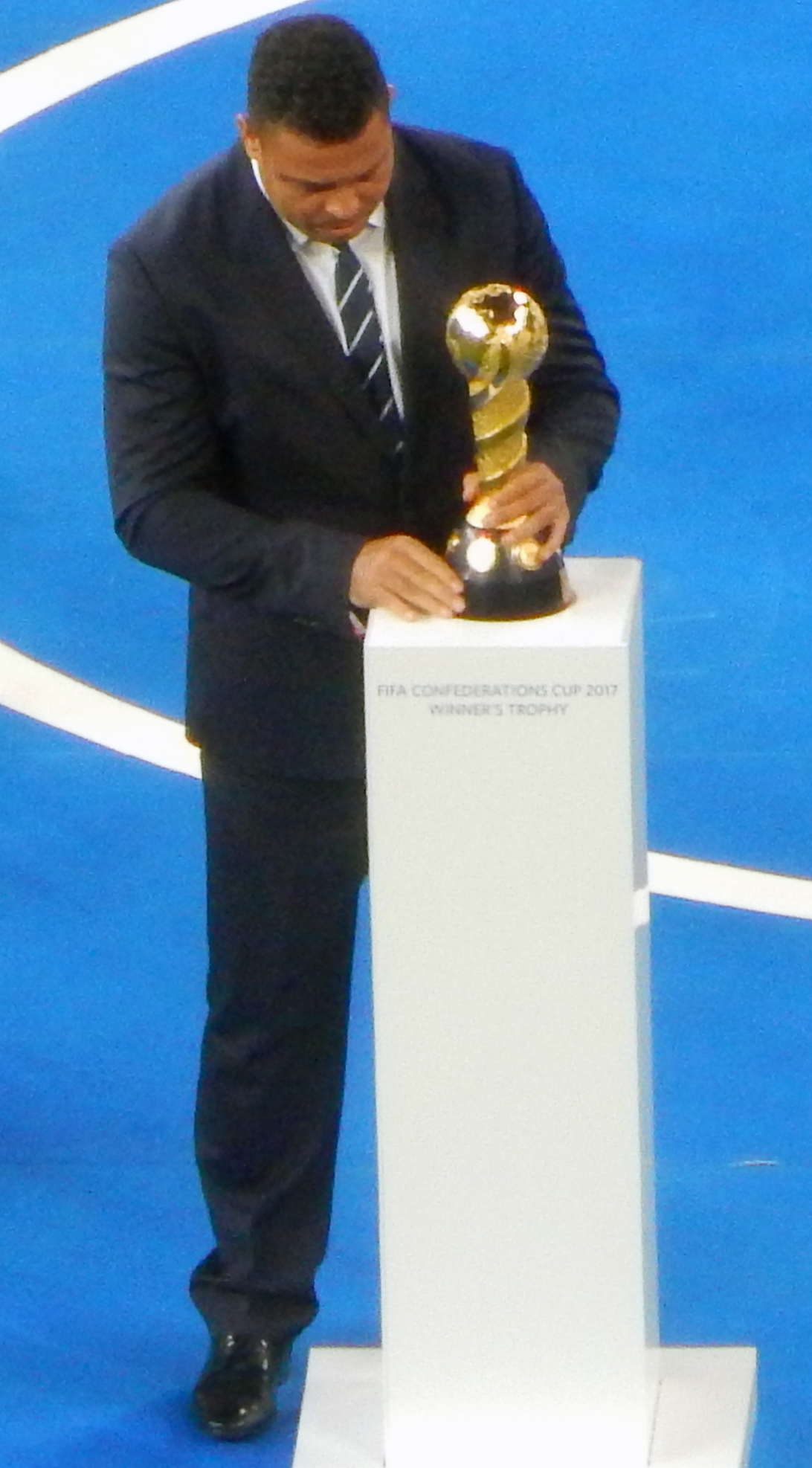
Ronaldo (pictured with the FIFA Confederations Cup in 2017) won the trophy with Brazil in 1997

Ronaldo made his international debut for Brazil on 23 March 1994 in a friendly match in Recife against Argentina. His first senior goal for Brazil came on 4 May 1994 in a 3–0 friendly win against Iceland. He went to the 1994 FIFA World Cup in the United States aged 17, but did not play as Brazil went on to win the tournament. He stated he was "overjoyed" at the experience. He was then known as Ronaldinho ("little Ronaldo" in Portuguese), because Ronaldo Rodrigues de Jesus, his older teammate, was also called Ronaldo and later nicknamed Ronaldão ("big Ronaldo") to further distinguish them. Another player, Ronaldo de Assis Moreira, now widely known as Ronaldinho, was called Ronaldinho Gaúcho when he joined the Brazil team in 1999.

=== Atlanta '96 and Copa América ===
At the 1996 Summer Olympics in Atlanta, Ronaldo used the name Ronaldinho again, since centre-back Ronaldo Guiaro, two years his senior, was one of his teammates. Brazil went on to win the bronze medal. Ronaldo also represented Brazil in the 1995 Copa América (finishing second) and won both the 1997 and the 1999 editions of the tournament. He was named player of the tournament in 1997, was the top scorer in 1999 and scored in the finals of both, against Bolivia in 1997 and Uruguay in 1999. He also took part in the friendly Tournoi de France in 1997, preceding the 1998 FIFA World Cup, scoring a goal as Brazil became runners-up. Ronaldo starred alongside Romário, dubbed the Ro-Ro attack, at the 1997 FIFA Confederations Cup, helping Brazil win their first ever Confederations Cup title where he finished as the third-highest scorer with 4 goals, scoring a hat-trick against Australia in the final. On the combination of Ronaldo and Romário, Will Sharp writes: "...to the elation of all those fortunate enough to have watched them, they found themselves together, fated with the opportunity to forge one of the most outrageous offensive pairings the game has ever seen. Their partnership was brief but it was inexplicably brilliant."

=== 1998 FIFA World Cup ===
"The way he combined powerhouse athleticism with a poetic touch made for an awesome sight. In the 1990s, in his physical pomp, in his free-flowing prime, there was nothing remotely like him. By the time the 1998 World Cup came along his reputation had extended to the point of fully formed marvel. A happening."

— Amy Lawrence, The Guardian.

Ronaldo entered the 1998 FIFA World Cup in France billed as the world's greatest player by reporters in the sport. Jacob Steinberg of The Guardian writes, "In 1998, no one was as ferociously talented as Ronaldo, whose supernatural mixture of power, pace and skill had made him the player every child in the playground wanted to be; at the age of 21, the hopes and dreams of a nation rested on his shoulders."

Ronaldo scored four goals and made three assists en route to the final, scoring once and assisting Bebeto's goal in a 3–0 win against Morocco in the team's second group stage match, netting twice in a 4–1 win against Chile in the round of 16, set–up two goals in Brazil's 3–2 victory over Denmark in the quarter-finals, and scored once in the 1–1 draw against the Netherlands in the semi-finals, also netting Brazil's first penalty in the 4–2 shoot–out victory. Hours before the final against France, Ronaldo suffered a convulsive fit. At first, he was removed from the starting lineup 72 minutes before the match, and the team sheet (with Edmundo as his replacement) was submitted to the FIFA delegate. The starting line up without Ronaldo was released to a stunned world media. The BBC's John Motson stated, "The scenes in the commentary box have been absolute mayhem and chaos." However, shortly before kick off, after pleading that he felt fine and requested to play, Ronaldo was reinstated by Brazil coach Mário Zagallo.

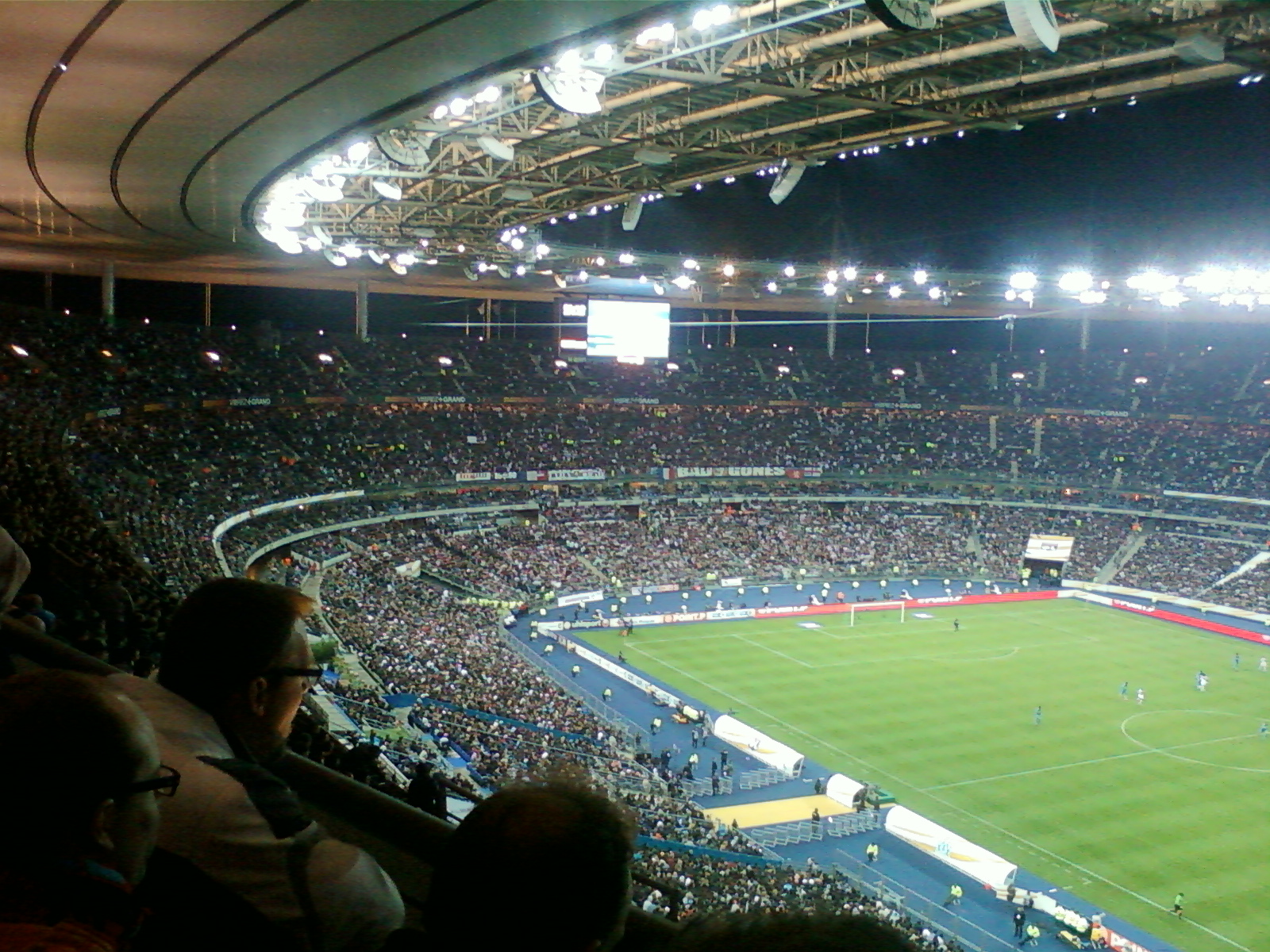
Stade de France (interior pictured), where Ronaldo performed in the 1998 World Cup Final despite suffering a convulsive fit six hours before kick off

Ronaldo was the last Brazilian player out of the tunnel as the teams entered the field. During the playing of the Brazil national anthem the camera focused on him throughout, with Ronaldo showing little emotion. Steinberg states that Ronaldo "sleepwalked" through the final, which also saw him injured in a collision with French goalkeeper Fabien Barthez. Zagallo admitted the fears over Ronaldo affected his team psychologically, and stated "for the whole of the first half I was wondering whether to take him off", but feared a public outcry in Brazil had he done so. Brazil lost the match to hosts France 3–0. Ronaldo later reflected: "We lost the World Cup but I won another cup – my life."

An inquest was launched in Brazil, with team doctor Lídio Toledo telling the commission "imagine if I stopped Ronaldo playing and Brazil lost. At that moment I'd have to go and live on the North Pole." Adrian Williams, professor of clinical neurology at Birmingham University, said that Ronaldo should not have played, that he would have been feeling the after effects of the seizure, and "there is no way that he would have been able to perform to the best of his ability within 24 hours of his first fit – if it was his first fit." Despite his sub-par performance in the final due to his seizure hours earlier, Ronaldo was awarded the Golden Ball as the best player of the tournament for his performances leading up to the final, and finished the tournament as the joint-third highest scorer. The nature of the incident set off a trail of questions and allegations which persisted for years, with Alex Bellos writing in The Guardian,

When Ronaldo's health scare was revealed after the match, the situation's unique circumstances lent itself to conspiracy theories. Here was the world's most famous sportsman, about to take part in the most important match of his career, when he suddenly, inexplicably, fell ill. Was it stress, epilepsy, or had he been drugged?"

A conspiracy surrounded Nike, the sportswear company who sponsored Ronaldo and the Brazilian national team, with some in Brazil believing the company had forced Ronaldo to play. The parliamentary inquiry was unable to find any wider conspiracy, although the Brazilian public remained unconvinced. Reporting for CNN, Don Riddell wrote, "It's one of the great mysteries of our time: not the Loch Ness Monster, Stonehenge or the Lost City of Atlantis; it's the case of the missing striker – not so much a whodunit, more a kind of a what the heck happened?"

=== 2002 FIFA World Cup ===
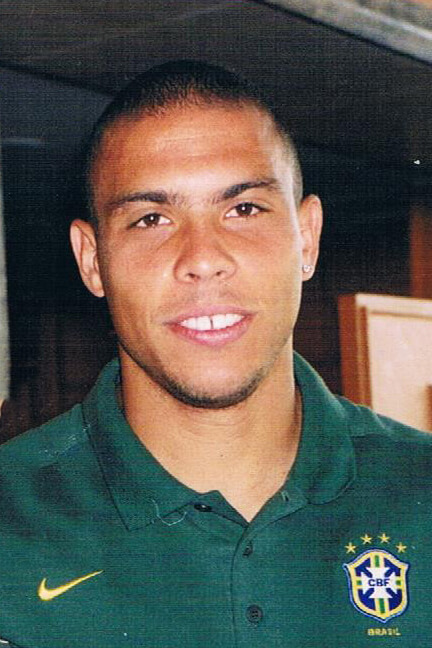
Ronaldo on 29 June 2002, hours before the 2002 World Cup Final

Prior to the 2002 FIFA World Cup in South Korea and Japan, Ronaldo had barely played since rupturing the cruciate ligament in his right knee in April 2000, and he missed Brazil's entire qualification campaign where, in his absence, the team had been poor. Tim Vickery writes, "Without Ronaldo, Brazil were a shambles, fortunate even to get to the tournament. With him, it was a different story." In a remarkable comeback from injury that had threatened his career, Ronaldo led Brazil to their record fifth World Cup title, receiving the Golden Boot as top scorer with eight goals. Many publications regarded his personal triumph as "redemption" for what occurred at the previous World Cup. Ronaldo spoke about his obsession with lifting the World Cup trophy, having missed out in 1998. "I used to visualise the trophy in front of my eyes and imagine what a wonderful feeling it must be to hold it up in the air. It was a fabulous feeling actually to hold it in my hands and kiss it." Dubbed the "three R's", Ronaldo starred in a formidable attack alongside Rivaldo and Ronaldinho, and the trio were named in the FIFA World Cup All-Star Team.

Ronaldo scored against every opponent in the tournament except in the quarter-finals against England. The match-winner against Turkey in the semi-final, with the winning goal a toe-poke finish with little back-lift while on the run – a finish he learned while playing futsal in his youth – the final whistle saw fans behind the goal hoist huge white letters to spell out his name, akin to the Hollywood Sign. Much attention was on his haircut – in which his head was shaved except the forelock – done as a deliberate distraction to shift media attention away from a leg injury. He revealed that "when I arrived in training with this haircut everybody stopped talking about the injury". In the final against Germany in Yokohama, Japan, Ronaldo scored twice in Brazil's 2–0 win and tied Pelé's Brazilian record of 12 career World Cup goals. Ronaldo was the first player to seek out German players to offer his condolences, before he was congratulated by Pelé when receiving his World Cup winners medal. Gérard Saillant, the French surgeon who operated on Ronaldo's knee, was in the crowd as his guest, and stated after the game; "This gives hope to everyone who is injured, even those who aren't sportsmen, to see that by fighting you can make it. He's back to where he was; it's hugely satisfying and I am very moved."

Ronaldo received a number of accolades for his achievement, including the Laureus World Sports Award for Comeback of the Year and the BBC World Sport Star of the Year, and in December 2002 he dedicated his third FIFA World Player of the Year award to the medical team which helped him recover. In a 2017 interview with Fox Sports, Ronaldo stated, "the best team I played in was the Brazilian one in 2002, we felt that we could always score. It was a team without any vanity, or individuals. The collective was important."

=== 2006 FIFA World Cup ===
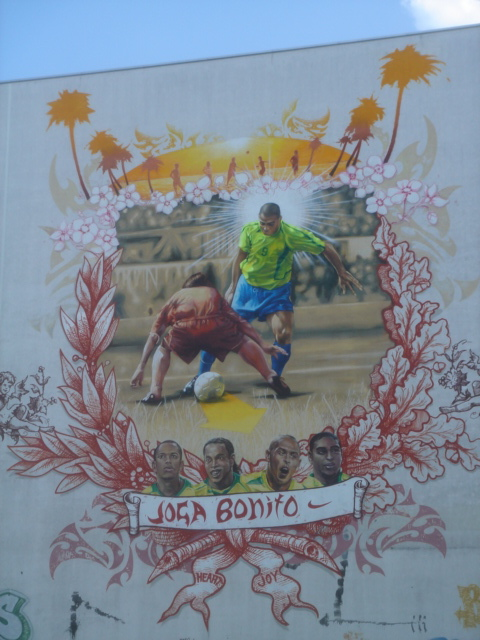
Ronaldo mural in Berlin promoting Brazilian Joga Bonito style of play. The work was commissioned by Nike prior to the 2006 World Cup in Germany.

On 2 June 2004, Ronaldo scored an unusual hat-trick of penalties for Brazil against arch-rivals Argentina in a 2006 World Cup qualifying match, which put them top of the group. With 10 goals in 15 games, including a goal against Venezuela in the last game to secure first place, Ronaldo was the South American top scorer in Brazil's qualifying campaign. Prior to the tournament, questions were asked of his weight and fitness, but was declared fit for Brazil's opening match with Croatia.

At the 2006 World Cup, Ronaldo was part of a much-publicized "magic quartet" alongside Adriano, Ronaldinho and Kaká. The all-star Brazilian team was promoted as masters of Joga Bonito, "the beautiful game", which was advertised by Nike before the tournament. Although Brazil won their first two group games against Croatia and Australia, Ronaldo was repeatedly jeered for being overweight and slow, but coach Carlos Alberto Parreira kept him in the starting lineup.

With two goals against Japan in the third match, Ronaldo became the 20th player to score in three World Cups and also equalled the all-time World Cup finals scoring record of fourteen, held by Gerd Müller (Ronaldo scored at France 98, Korea/Japan 2002 and Germany 2006). He then broke Müller's record in the Round of 16 match against Ghana by scoring his fifteenth-career World Cup goal. With his third goal of the tournament, Ronaldo became only the second player ever, after Jürgen Klinsmann, to score at least three goals in each of three World Cups. Brazil, however, were knocked out by France 1–0 with a goal by striker Thierry Henry in the quarter-finals. Ronaldo was awarded the Bronze Shoe as the third-highest goal-scorer of the World Cup.

Having been listed in Guinness World Records, Ronaldo stated, "I am proud of my career and of the records I set. But I know that one day they will be broken." Ronaldo and Klinsmann's shared record of at least three goals in three separate World Cup finals was broken by German striker Miroslav Klose, who has a record of at least four goals in each of three tournaments, having netted five at both the 2002 and 2006 finals, and four at the 2010 tournament. Ronaldo finished with fifteen goals in nineteen World Cup matches, for an average of 0.79 per game. His teammate Kaká reflected, "Ronaldo is the best player I have ever played with. I have seen il Fenomeno do things nobody else has ever done."

=== Farewell match and sporadic appearances ===
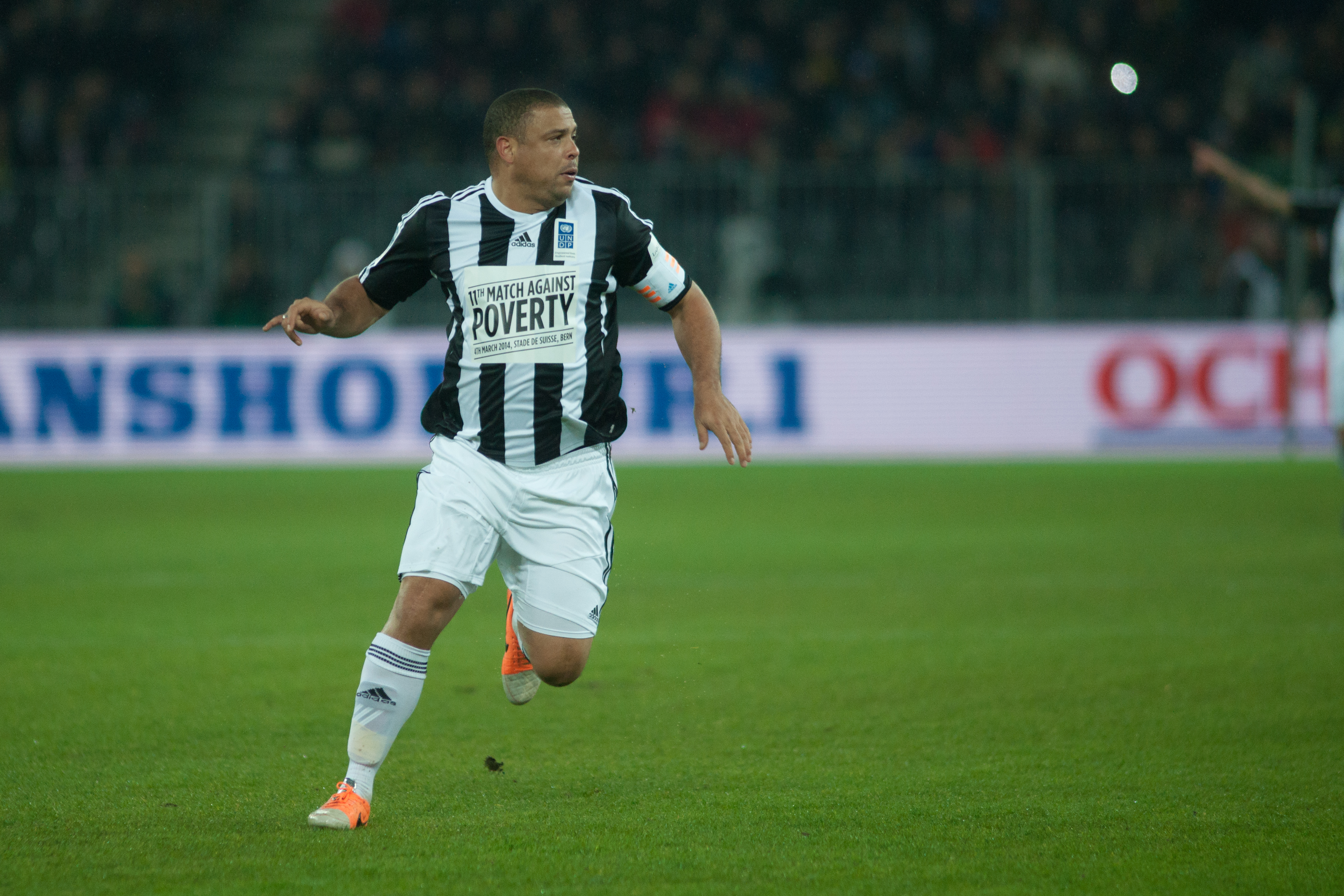
Ronaldo playing in the Match Against Poverty in Bern, March 2014

In February 2011, it was announced that Ronaldo would be given one last match for Brazil, a friendly against Romania in São Paulo on 7 June 2011, five years after his last match with the national team. Brazilian Football Confederation official Ricardo Teixeira stated that it was fitting that his final game should take place in Brazil while representing his nation.

Ronaldo played for 15 minutes in a match that ended with a Brazilian victory with a goal from Fred. Fred celebrated his goal with Ronaldo's famous 'finger wag' celebration along with his Brazilian teammates. Ronaldo was introduced after 30 minutes, partnering 19-year-old Neymar in attack, and had three shots on target which were saved by the Romanian goalkeeper Ciprian Tătărușanu. After the first half ended, Ronaldo made a farewell speech to the crowd. With 62 goals for Brazil Ronaldo retired from international football as the second-highest goalscorer for his country, behind only Pelé (Neymar has since surpassed Pelé, with Ronaldo the third-highest scorer as of September 2023).

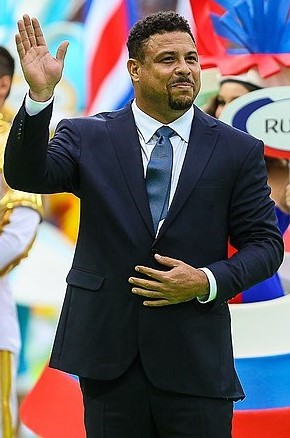
Ronaldo at the 2018 FIFA World Cup opening ceremony held at the Luzhniki Stadium in Moscow, Russia

On 13 December 2011 Ronaldo and Zinedine Zidane played a charity match with their friends against former and current players of the German team Hamburg in the ninth edition of the Match Against Poverty series, which Ronaldo and Zidane established in 2003. In December 2012, Ronaldo and Zidane reunited for the Match Against Poverty in Porto Alegre, Portugal, with the field littered with World Cup winners from France and Brazil, which also saw 1982 World Cup star Zico (Ronaldo's childhood idol) turn out for Ronaldo's team. In January 2013, Ronaldo was named one of the six ambassadors of the 2014 FIFA World Cup in Brazil.

Ronaldo was chosen as a goodwill ambassador for the United Nations Development Programme (UNDP) in 2000 as he had the highest global appeal among sportspeople, and he accepted the role as he saw it as "an obligation" to help with causes around the world. Ronaldo played in the UNDP's 11th Match Against Poverty on 4 March 2014 against a Zidane XI in Bern, Switzerland, with proceeds raised helping the recovery efforts in the Philippines in the wake of Typhoon Haiyan. Joined by Didier Drogba in attack, Ronaldo scored a hat-trick in the next year's match on 21 April 2015 in St Etienne, France, with proceeds going towards the African countries most affected by the Ebola epidemic.

On 14 June 2018, Ronaldo featured at the 2018 FIFA World Cup opening ceremony held at the Luzhniki Stadium in Moscow, Russia. He walked out with a child wearing a Russia 2018 shirt at the beginning, and returned at the end of the ceremony with the official ball of the 2018 World Cup – Adidas Telstar 18 – which was sent into space with the International Space Station crew in March and came back to Earth in early June.

== Style of play and legacy ==
Ronaldo is widely regarded as one of the greatest and most complete forwards of all time. Nicknamed Il (or O) Fenomeno (the phenomenon), he was a prolific goalscorer, and despite being more of an individualistic attacker, he was also capable of providing assists for his teammates, due to his vision, passing and crossing ability. He was an extremely powerful, fast, and technical player, with excellent movement, as well as being a composed finisher. Highly regarded for his technical ability, Ronaldo was able to use both feet, despite being naturally right footed, and is considered one of the most skillful dribblers in the game. Ronaldo would also operate outside the penalty area before running with the ball towards goal, with Rob Smyth writing, "he played like every attack had a 10-second deadline.. he would explode into life with no warning for defenders." He frequently beat several players when dribbling at speed, and excelled in one on one situations, due to his ball control, acceleration, agility, balance and nimble footwork in his prime.

His coach at Barcelona, Bobby Robson, commented: "Ronaldo could start from the halfway line and the whole stadium would ignite. He was the fastest thing I've ever seen running with the ball. Had he managed to stay free of injury, he had every chance of becoming the best footballer ever." In one on one situations, Ronaldo often used elaborate feints to trick and beat defenders and goalkeepers; he popularised the use of many football tricks such as the elastico and the step over. Sid Lowe of Sports Illustrated wrote, "When he was one on one with the goalkeeper, you knew that he would score. He was so natural, so cool, so utterly in control. He would dip the shoulder, step over, and bang!"

His Barcelona teammate Óscar García observed, "I'd never seen anyone play football with such technical ability, creativity and precision at that incredible speed. What stood out to all of us, from the moment we met Ronnie, was that he could do things which other players found very difficult and make them look easy. But he could also produce those things while running at an unbelievable, explosive pace." With his combination of speed, skill and finishing Ronaldinho called Ronaldo "the most complete striker there has ever been", a view echoed by Zlatan Ibrahimović, who stated, "as a football player, he was complete. There will never, in my view, be a better player than him." The goalscoring idol of Lionel Messi, the Argentine states "Ronaldo was the best striker I've ever seen. He was so fast he could score from nothing." Wanting to emulate Ronaldo growing up, Egypt and Liverpool forward Mohamed Salah opined, "The ability, the speed, the intelligence, he had everything". Naming Ronaldo as an inspiration, Wayne Rooney stated, "as an out-and-out forward he was probably the best." The outstanding influence for a generation of strikers, from Karim Benzema to Sergio Agüero, with Romelu Lukaku stating "he changed the dimension of a striker" and could "dribble like a winger, run like a sprinter", Zlatan added, "nobody influenced football and the players who emerged as much as Ronaldo".

Ronaldo, as so many of those who looked up to him acknowledge, changed what it is to be a centre-forward. Every time you see a striker who is expected to hold the ball up, beat players, win headers, shoot from range, drop deep, do everything a striker can possibly do – it might be worth remembering him. He shifted boundaries, challenged convention, just as much as Messi and Cristiano Ronaldo have altered our perceptions of what a winger might be. Ronaldo, the original Ronaldo, inspired a phalanx of imitators, players we see on our screens every weekend. But he also turned the game so that it will always look just a little bit like him. More than most, he made that No. 9 his own.

— Rory Smith writing for ESPN on Ronaldo changing the game for strikers, March 2016.

Emilio Butragueño stated, "Ronaldo creates a goalscoring opportunity where it doesn't exist. Most strikers need the midfielders and their teammates, but he does not." On his speed of thought, Kaká said "For me the best players are those who are able to think of a play and execute it quickest and in the best way possible, and Ronaldo was the best at that. The speed of thought he had – and the speed he had to carry out his actions – were perfect." Ronaldo was also a strong and powerful player who could shield the ball from the opposition, with former Italian defender Alessandro Nesta (who faced Ronaldo in a high-profile one on one duel in the 1998 UEFA Cup final which was billed as "the best attacker against the best defender in Serie A") stating: "It was the worst experience of my career. Ronaldo is the hardest attacker I've ever had to face." Asked who was the toughest opponent of his career, Fabio Cannavaro responded, "I have no doubt, Ronaldo, the phenomenon. For my generation he was what Maradona or Pelé were for the previous ones. He was unmarkable." Sid Lowe compared Ronaldo's ability to take on a number of opponents on a single run to what rugby player Jonah Lomu was doing in the same era. Regarding Ronaldo's influence on the evolution of the centre-forward role, French former forward Thierry Henry said: "He did things nobody had seen before. He, together with Romário and George Weah, reinvented the centre-forward position. They were the first to drop from the box to pick up the ball in midfield, switch to the flanks, attract and disorientate the central defenders with their runs, their accelerations, their dribbling."

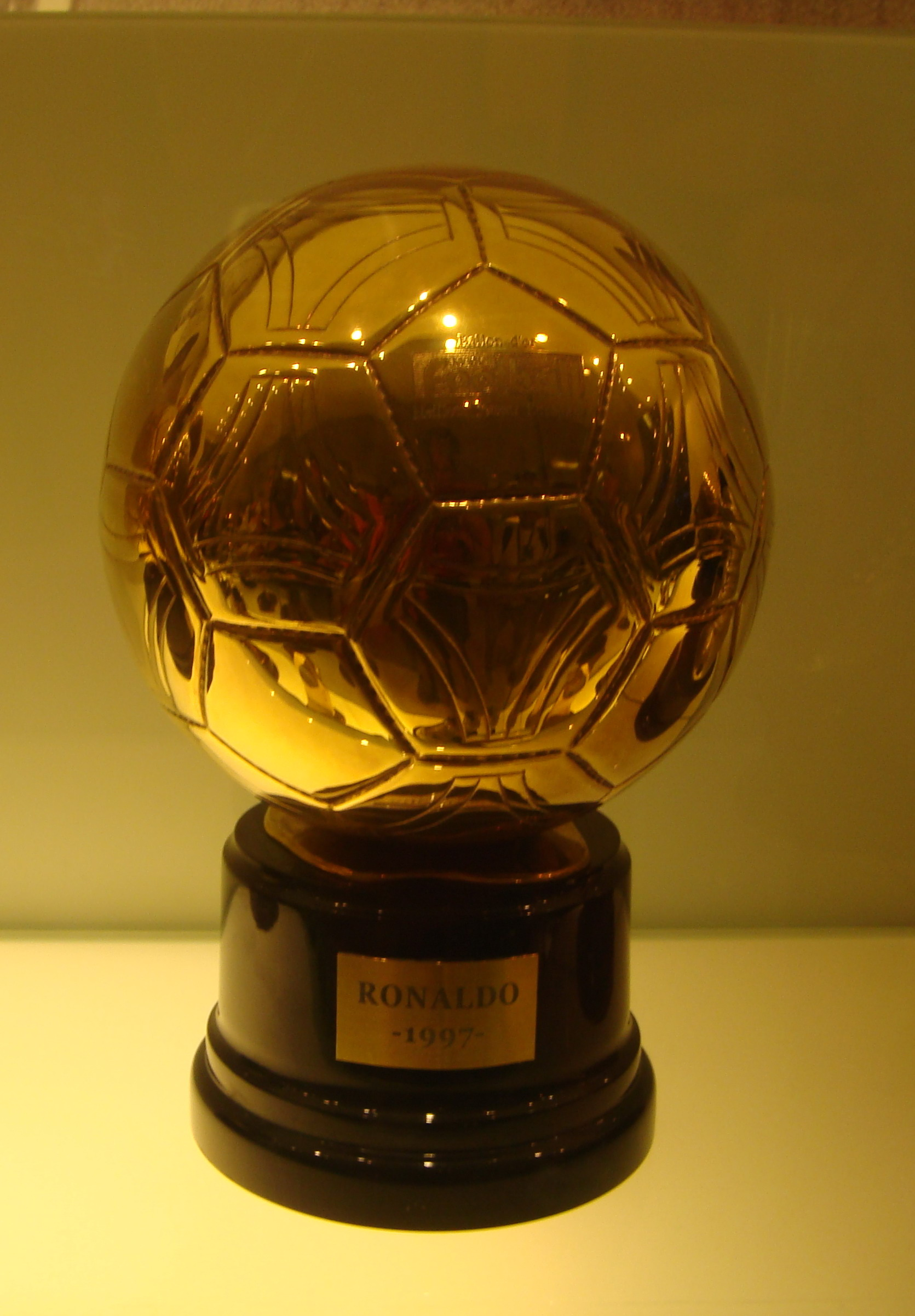
Ronaldo's 1997 Ballon d'Or trophy. He remains its youngest recipient.

Comparing his natural ability to Roger Federer, Paul MacDonald of Goal wrote, "there's a joy to be had watching something we know to be extremely difficult executed with considerable ease. Ronaldo in his prime was able to do that better than anyone who has ever played the game." A reliance on his superior innate ability is given as a reason for his application in training often not being as high as his teammates – though his knee issues may also have been a factor – with his Brazil teammate Emerson stating "Ronaldo felt he didn't need to work as hard as us, that he could do in two days what the rest of us would take ten days to do. And usually, he was right". On his precocious talent – a talent which saw him become the youngest FIFA World Player of the Year at age 20, and youngest Ballon d'Or recipient aged 21 – Rob Smyth of The Guardian wrote in 2016, "Ronaldo is easily the best of the past 30 years, possibly ever. The other Ronaldo and Messi were brilliant teenagers but had nothing like the same impact at that age. Only Pelé, Diego Maradona and George Best can really compare." Asked to name the best player of his lifetime, José Mourinho said, "Ronaldo, El Fenomeno. Cristiano Ronaldo and Leo Messi have had longer careers. They have remained at the top every day for 15 years. However, if we are talking strictly about talent and skill, nobody surpasses Ronaldo." Mikaël Silvestre states, "I played against [Lionel] Messi and I played with Cristiano at Manchester United, but he [Ronaldo] is something else in terms of speed. Cristiano, maybe you can guess that he has three or four tricks he would use most of the time, but Ronaldo, it was always something different. He was inventing things on the spot, so you can't guide him left or right because he's going to get out of these situations, no matter what". In 2020, Ronaldo was named in the Ballon d'Or Dream Team, a greatest all-time XI published by France Football magazine.

"There were two Ronaldos: the one that returned after long-term injury in 2002 was a great goalscorer, but the 1990s version was a great everything. At his fearsome peak for PSV, Barcelona and Inter Milan he was arguably the most dangerous striker the world has ever seen."

— Rob Smyth, The Guardian.

At his physical peak in the 1990s, Ronaldo became severely affected by the knee injuries he suffered from late 1999 onward and the subsequent weight gain during his inactivity, which limited his speed, fitness, and mobility. According to his physiotherapist Nilton Petrone, Ronaldo was vulnerable to injury due to a medical condition combined with his explosive running. "Ronaldo had a problem called trochlear dysplasia. This makes the relationship between the kneecap and the femur a bit unstable. There is no direct surgery for that so the kneecap keeps, for a lack of a better word, "dancing" on the femur. Ronaldo's injuries weren't because his body was weak, but because of his explosive capacity. He didn't just run fast in a straight line, he also changed direction at incredible speed. Ronaldo moved from left to right very fast...so it was obvious, by the way that he played, that injuries were always a possibility". Acknowledging "he was never quite the same" after his knee injury in 2000, with "his pace and sheer brute force diminished in comparison to The Phenomenon" in the 1990s, FourFourTwo magazine ranked him the best player at the 2002 World Cup, adding "he was still a cut above the rest" in the tournament.

== Club ownership ==
=== Real Valladolid ===
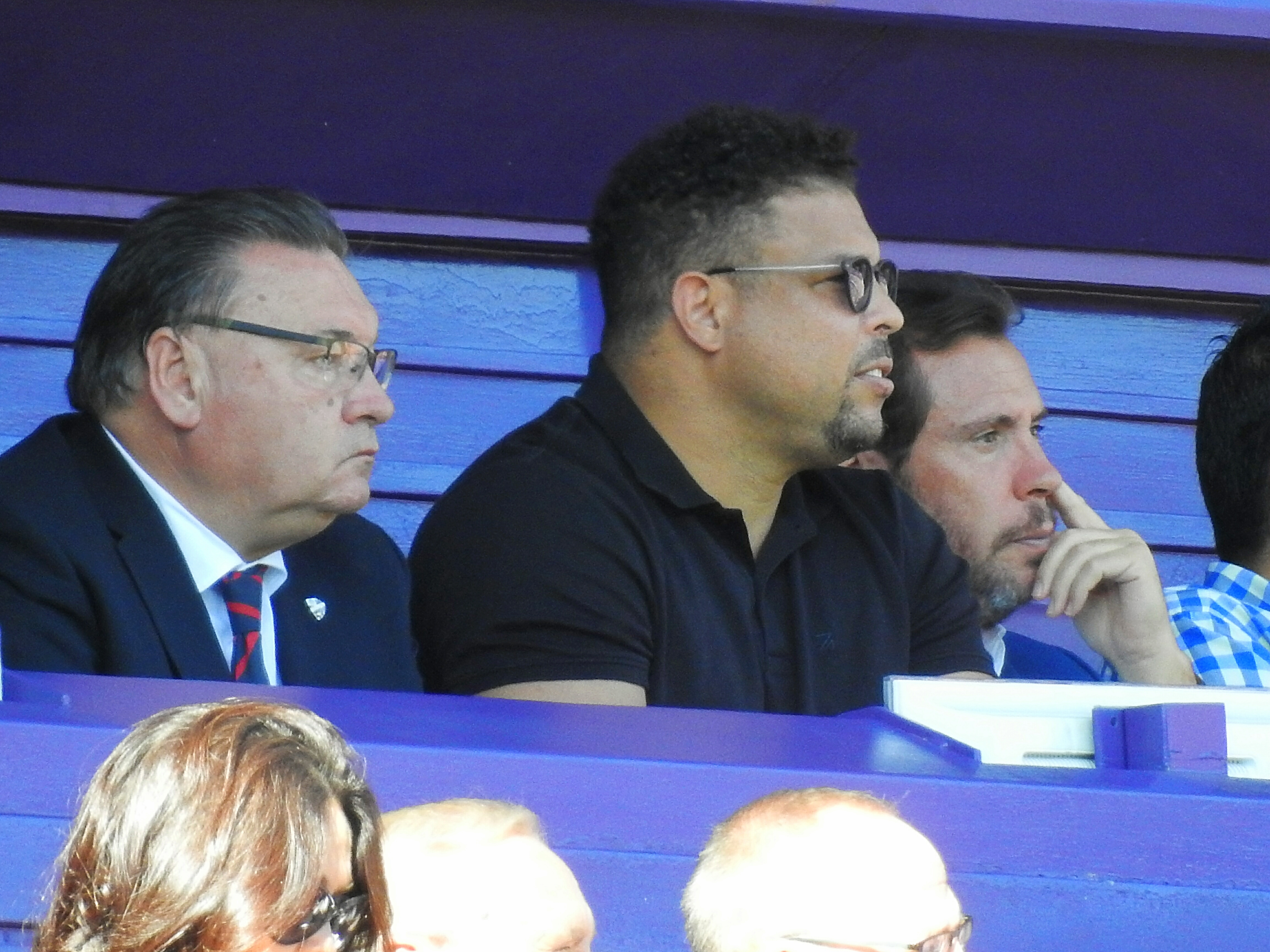
Ronaldo in 2018 as the president of Real Valladolid, his first club as owner

In September 2018, Ronaldo became the majority owner of La Liga club Real Valladolid after buying a 51% controlling stake in the club for €30 million. At his unveiling as the club's new owner at Valladolid city hall, Ronaldo stated, "I have gone through many stages in my training in football to prepare for this. Football is all about passion. We want to build the best team possible to compete while also giving information about our management with transparency."

=== Cruzeiro ===
In December 2021, Ronaldo bought a controlling stake in his boyhood club Cruzeiro. Investing 400 million reais ($70 million) in the club, Ronaldo stated he wants to "give back to Cruzeiro and take them where they deserve to be."

On 30 April 2024, an announcement was made that Ronaldo had agreed to sell his ownership stake for undisclosed terms to BPW Sports company. The announcement also noted that Ronaldo would continue to be on the club's board of directors.

== Outside football ==
=== Personal life ===
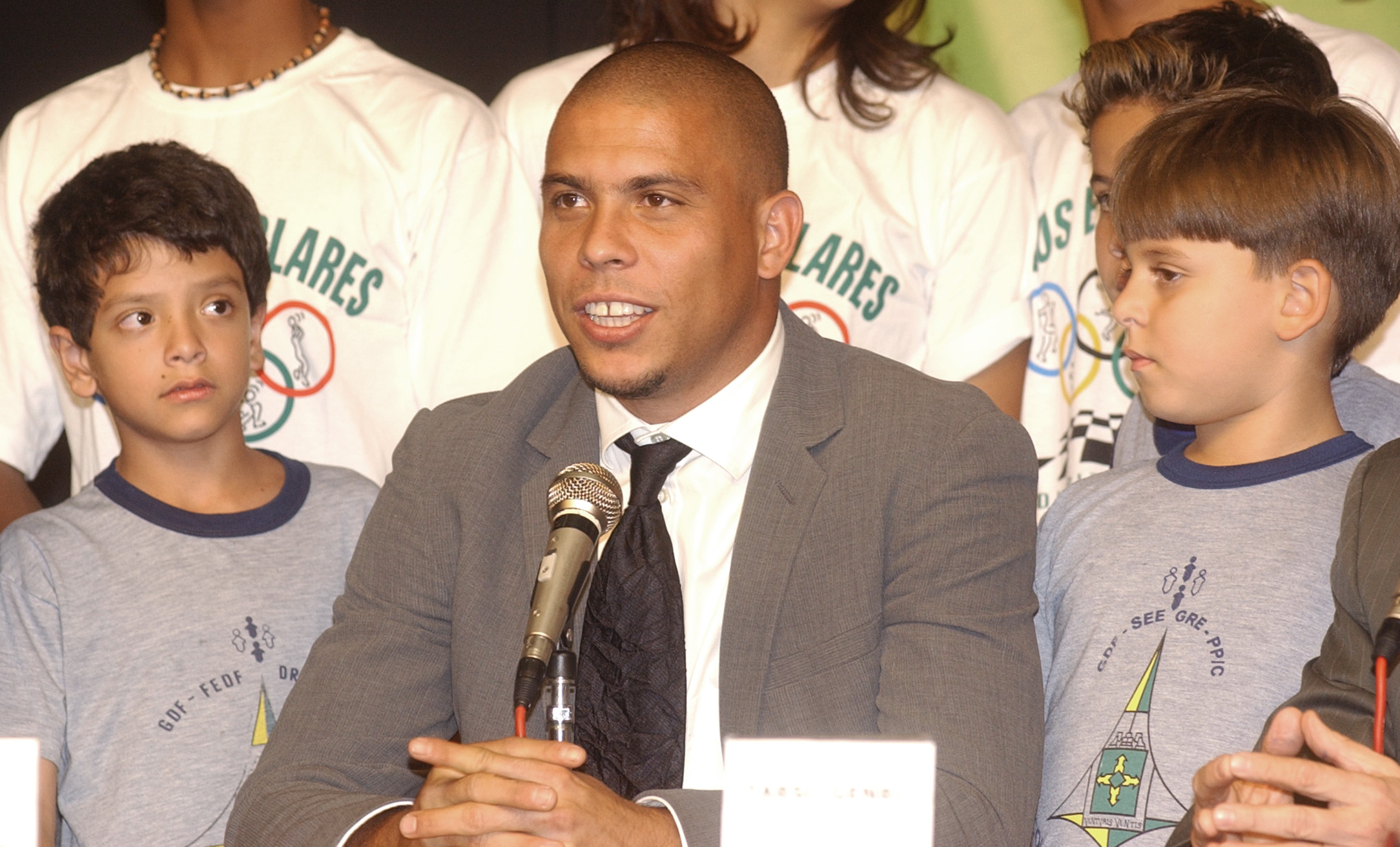
Ronaldo during a 2005 meeting at the Brazilian Ministry of Education

In 1997, Ronaldo met the Brazilian model and actress Susana Werner on the set of the Brazilian telenovela Malhação when they acted together in three episodes. Although they never married, they began a long-term relationship and lived together in Milan until the beginning of 1999.

In December 1999, Ronaldo married Brazilian footballer Milene Domingues, at the time pregnant with the couple's first son, who was born in Milan, on 6 April 2000. The marriage lasted four years. In 2005, Ronaldo became engaged to Brazilian model and MTV VJ Daniella Cicarelli, who became pregnant but suffered a miscarriage; the relationship lasted only three months after their luxurious wedding at the Château de Chantilly. The ceremony reportedly cost £700,000 (€896,000).

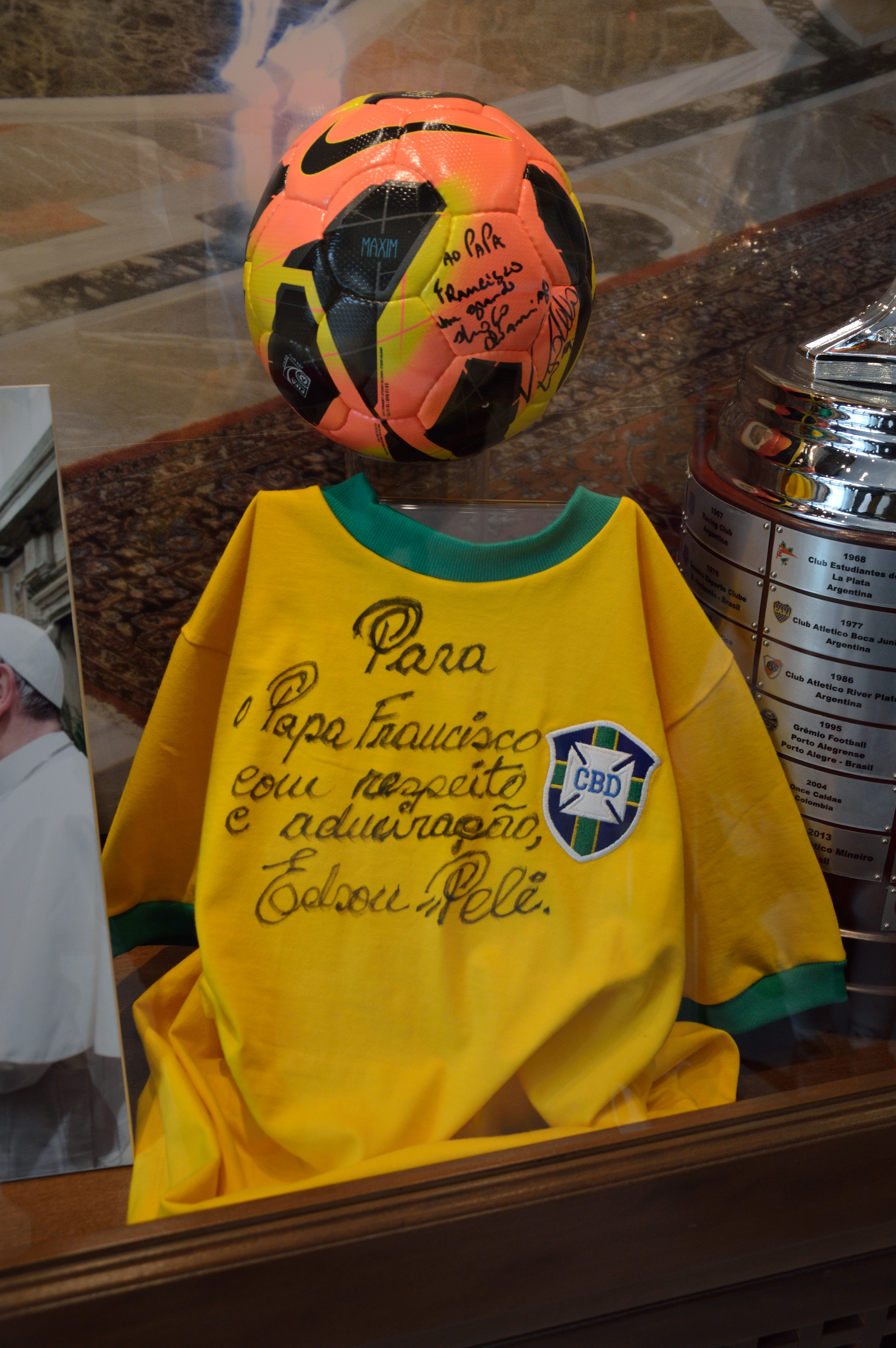
A practicing Catholic, Ronaldo donated a signed football to Pope Francis. Accompanied with a signed Brazil jersey from Pelé, it is located in one of the Vatican Museums.

Despite his fame – a 2003 poll by Nike listed him the world's most famous sportsperson (and third most famous person overall) – Ronaldo is protective of his privacy, including with teammates, stating in an interview with The Telegraph, "each [player] has his own private life, and no one thinks about anyone else's private life. Or talks about it." By 2003 he was fluent in Portuguese, Spanish and Italian, and had a good understanding of English.

In a 2005 interview with Folha de S.Paulo, Ronaldo revealed that, somewhat unexpectedly, he identified racially as white, generating a wider conversation about the complex role of race in Brazil. Ronaldo's father, Nelio Nazario, stated, "He knows full well that he's black. Actually, at the time, I thought it was some philosophy, something to that effect. Because he knows he's black." According to a study led by geneticist Sérgio Pena of the Brazilian Institute of Geography and Statistics, most Brazilians often have a misconception about their roots. "The maternal ancestry of the Brazilian white was one-third African, one third Amerindian, and one third European. An individual who considers himself white may be genomically more African than an individual who considers himself to be brown or black."

In April 2008, Ronaldo was involved in a scandal involving three travesti prostitutes whom he met in a nightclub in Rio de Janeiro. Ronaldo claimed that upon discovering that they were legally male, he offered them $600 to leave. One of the three attempted to blackmail Ronaldo, while the other two admitted to lying about having sex with him. Ronaldo's engagement to Maria Beatriz Antony was immediately halted, but resumed shortly after and they married in the same year. Maria Beatriz Antony gave birth to their first daughter in Rio de Janeiro, on 24 December 2008. In April 2009, the family moved to a new penthouse in São Paulo. On 6 April 2010, Maria Beatriz Antony gave birth to their second daughter in São Paulo.

In December 2010, Ronaldo and his family moved to a new mansion in São Paulo. Also in December, Ronaldo took a paternity test and was confirmed to be the father of a boy born in April 2005. He was born after a brief relationship between Ronaldo and Michele Umezu, a Brazilian waitress who Ronaldo first met in Tokyo in 2002. After the confirmation of his fourth child, Ronaldo stated on 6 December 2010 that he had had a vasectomy, feeling that having four children was enough. Ronaldo and Maria Beatriz Antony divorced in 2012.

In a 2011 interview with the BBC, former Real Madrid teammate Steve McManaman spoke about Ronaldo's personality. "He could go in a restaurant, and I could go in with him, and you're not just there with close friends. He invites everybody. You'd be at a table with him and it'd be a judge sitting opposite talking to a politician with someone off the street listening in. So he just had this amazing aura, where everyone wanted to join him. Sometimes there'd be 20 to 30 people sitting at meal times with him. He was a wonderful person. Everybody would second that, no matter what club he played for."

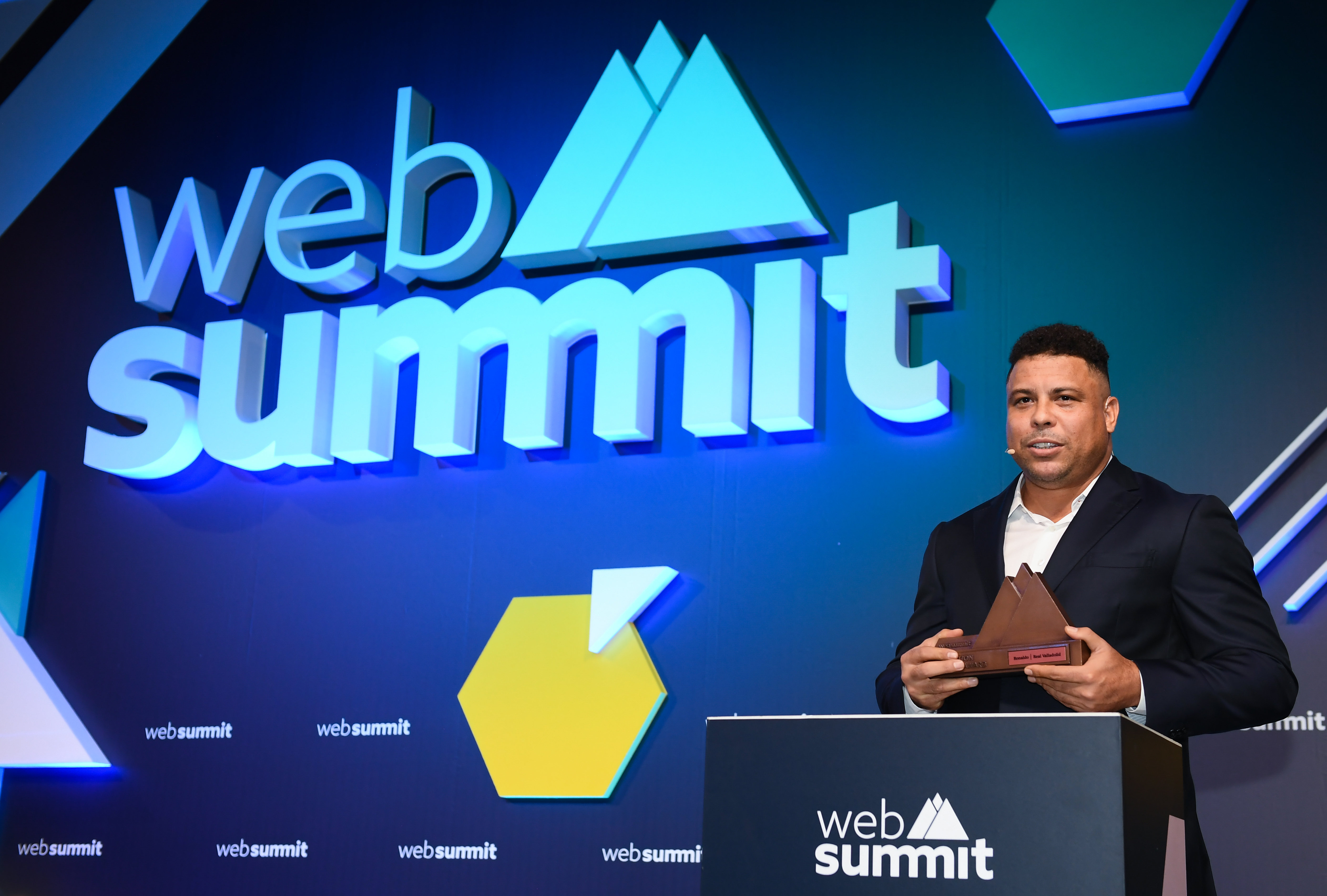
Ronaldo with his Innovation in Sport Award at the Web Summit in 2019

Ronaldo was the co-owner of A1 Team Brazil, along with former F1 driver Emerson Fittipaldi. Ronaldo co-owns the sports marketing company 9INE, with his friend, mixed martial artist Anderson Silva, one of his clients. A keen poker player, in April 2013 Ronaldo became a member of PokerStars SportStar, and in 2014 he played a charity poker tournament against tennis star Rafael Nadal. On 11 December 2014, Ronaldo became a minority owner of the Fort Lauderdale Strikers of the North American Soccer League. In 2015, Ronaldo opened eight new branches of his youth football school – the Ronaldo Academy – in China, the U.S. and Brazil, with 100 expected to be opened worldwide by 2020. In 2017, Ronaldo's son, Ronald, was selected for the junior football team representing Brazil in the 2017 Maccabiah Games. The Maccabiah is described as "the Jewish Olympics"; Ronald is not Jewish, but some participating countries have more relaxed rules about eligibility and Ronald is a member of a Jewish football club.

In January 2023, Ronaldo announced his fifth engagement, to model and businesswoman Celina Locks. Ronaldo and Locks went on to marry in July of the same year.

==== Religion ====
A practicing Catholic, Ronaldo was baptized into the faith in 2023. He donated a signed football to Pope Francis in 2014, which is now housed in the Vatican Museums.

=== Media ===
Ronaldo appeared in The Simpsons season 18 episode "Marge Gamer" broadcast in April 2007. Simon Crerar of The Times listed Ronaldo's performance as one of the thirty-three funniest cameos in the history of the show. Ronaldo made a cameo appearance in Mike Bassett: England Manager (2001) and each film of the Goal! film trilogy, Goal! (2005), Goal II: Living the Dream (2007) and Goal III: Taking on the World (2009). Archive footage of Ronaldo features in the music video "We Are One (Ole Ola)", the official song of the 2014 World Cup by Pitbull and Jennifer Lopez.

Ronaldo has appeared in various commercials, from Snickers chocolate bar to Pirelli tyres. Ronaldo's usual goal celebration of both arms outstretched – especially from his early career – was the basis for Pirelli's 1998 commercial where he replaced the figure of Christ from the Christ the Redeemer statue that towers over his home city of Rio de Janeiro while in an Inter Milan strip. It was controversial with the Catholic Church. Released in 2000 for the PlayStation and Game Boy Color, the video game Ronaldo V-Football was exclusively endorsed by Ronaldo. In 2017 Ronaldo was added as an icon to the Ultimate Team in EA Sports' FIFA video game FIFA 18, receiving a 95 rating along with Brazilian compatriot Pelé, Argentine playmaker Diego Maradona, former Russian goalkeeper Lev Yashin and former French star Thierry Henry. Ronaldo also appears as the cover athlete on the Icon edition of the game.

In May 2021, DAZN released the first of a six-part series titled Ronaldo: El Presidente. The series takes viewers inside the day-to-day running of Real Valladolid, revealing every challenge and triumph in Valladolid's first full season under their Brazilian president, intercut with parallel narratives detailing the highs and lows of Ronaldo's own playing career.

=== Nike sponsorship ===
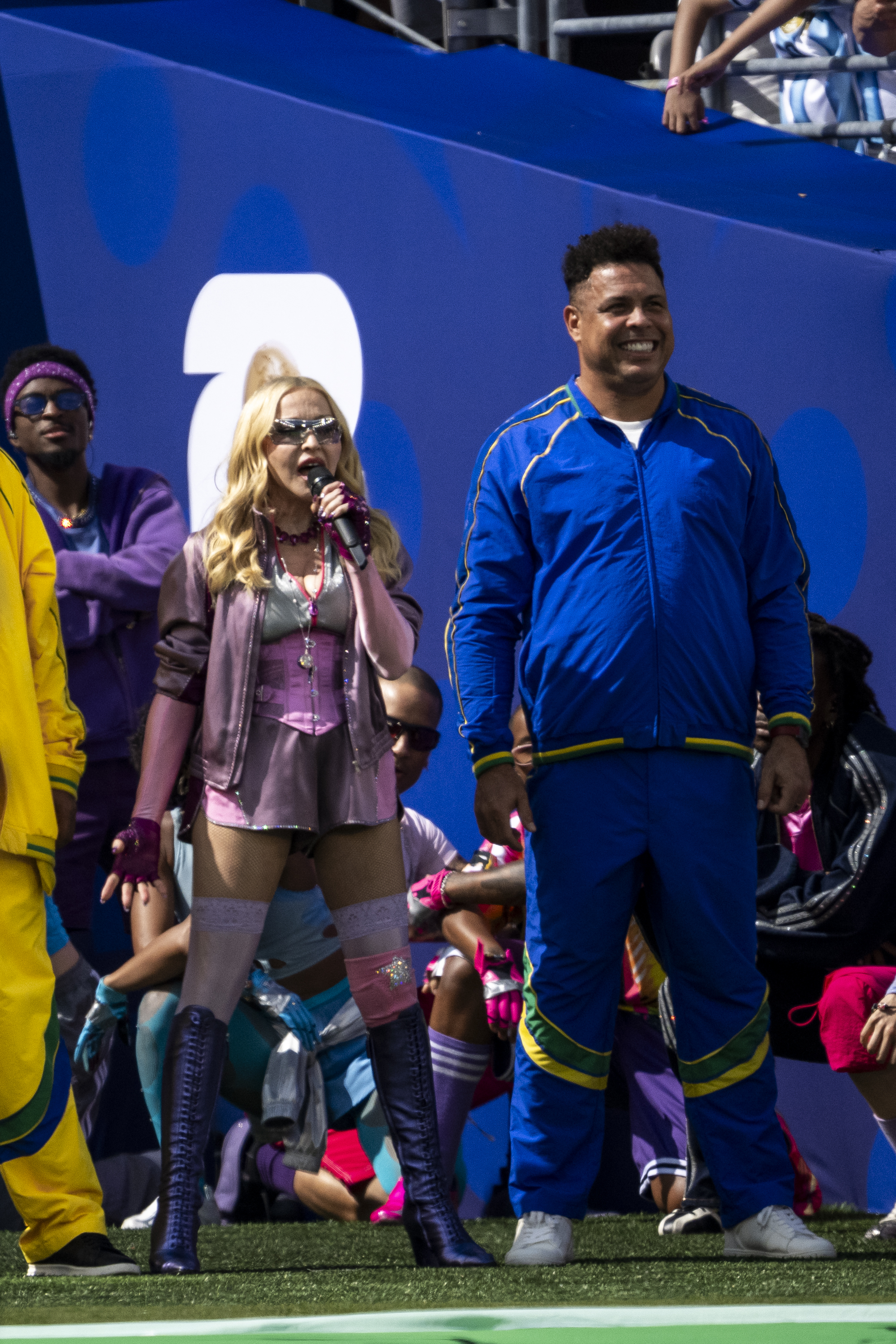
Ronaldo with Madonna during the 2026 FIFA World Cup final halftime show

Ronaldo has been sponsored by sportswear company Nike since the early part of his career. In 1996, Nike signed Ronaldo to a 10-year contract and to a lifetime endorsement deal worth over $180 million. Nicknamed R9 (his initial and shirt number), Ronaldo is closely associated with the original Nike Mercurial R9 that was designed for him for the 1998 FIFA World Cup. To celebrate 15 years of the boot, Nike created a Mercurial Vapor IX inspired by the 1998 design, with Phil McCartney, VP of Football Footwear for Nike, stating; "Ronaldo's impact on the game fifteen years ago was immense, and in the run up to 2014, we wanted to celebrate that boot and the man himself. We thought a modern construction of his 1998 boot would be a great commemoration of that moment." In 2018, Ronaldo's R9 Mercurial boots inspired the Nike Mercurial Superfly VI boots commissioned for Kylian Mbappé. Unveiled in 2000, a bronze statue of Ronaldo is located next to Ronaldo Field at Nike headquarters in Beaverton, Oregon.

Ronaldo has appeared in a series of Nike commercials. He starred in the 1996 Nike commercial titled "Good vs Evil" in a gladiatorial game set in a Roman amphitheatre. Appearing alongside football players from around the world, including Paolo Maldini, Eric Cantona, Luís Figo, Patrick Kluivert and Jorge Campos, they defend "the beautiful game" against a team of demonic warriors, destroying evil by winning the match. In 1998, he featured in a Nike commercial set in an airport with a number of stars from the Brazil national team, including Romário and Roberto Carlos. In the run-up to the 2002 World Cup in Korea and Japan, he starred in Nike's "Secret Tournament" commercial (branded "Scopion KO") directed by Terry Gilliam, appearing alongside football players such as Thierry Henry, Fabio Cannavaro, Francesco Totti, Ronaldinho and Hidetoshi Nakata, with former player Eric Cantona as the tournament "referee". In the run-up to the 2014 World Cup, Ronaldo starred as a mentor in Nike's Risk Everything animated commercial with a host of current players in the Nike stable.

== Career statistics ==
=== Club ===
Appearances and goals by club, season and competition
Club	Season	League			State league (Note: Includes Campeonato Mineiro, Campeonato Paulista)		National cup (Note: Includes KNVB Cup, Copa del Rey, Coppa Italia, Copa do Brasil)		Continental		Other		Total	
Club	Season	Division	Apps	Goals	Apps	Goals	Apps	Goals	Apps	Goals	Apps	Goals	Apps	Goals
Cruzeiro	1993	Série A	14	12	2	0	—		4	8	1	0	21	20
Cruzeiro	1994	Série A	—		18	22	—		8	2	—		26	24
Cruzeiro	Total		14	12	20	22	—		12	10	1	0	47	44
PSV	1994–95	Eredivisie	33	30	—		1	2	2 (Note: Appearances in UEFA Cup)	3	—		36	35
PSV	1995–96	Eredivisie	13	12	—		3	1	5	6	—		21	19
PSV	Total		46	42	—		4	3	7	9	—		57	54
Barcelona	1996–97	La Liga	37	34	—		4	6	7 (Note: Appearances in UEFA Cup Winners' Cup)	5	1 (Note: Appearance in Supercopa de España)	2	49	47
Inter Milan	1997–98	Serie A	32	25	—		4	3	11	6	—		47	34
Inter Milan	1998–99	Serie A	19	14	—		2	0	6 (Note: Appearances in UEFA Champions League)	1	1 (Note: Appearance in Serie A UEFA Cup qualification)	0	28	15
Inter Milan	1999–2000	Serie A	7	3	—		1	0	—		—		8	3
Inter Milan	2000–01	Serie A	0	0	—		0	0	0	0	—		0	0
Inter Milan	2001–02	Serie A	10	7	—		1	0	5	0	—		16	7
Inter Milan	Total		68	49	—		8	3	22	7	1	0	99	59
Real Madrid	2002–03	La Liga	31	23	—		1	0	11	6	1 (Note: Appearance in Intercontinental Cup)	1	44	30
Real Madrid	2003–04	La Liga	32	24	—		5	2	9	4	2 (Note: Appearances in Supercopa de España)	1	48	31
Real Madrid	2004–05	La Liga	34	21	—		1	0	10	3	—		45	24
Real Madrid	2005–06	La Liga	23	14	—		2	1	2	0	—		27	15
Real Madrid	2006–07	La Liga	7	1	—		2	1	4	2	—		13	4
Real Madrid	Total		127	83	—		11	4	36	15	3	2	177	104
AC Milan	2006–07	Serie A	14	7	—		—		—		—		14	7
AC Milan	2007–08	Serie A	6	2	—		—		—		—		6	2
AC Milan	Total		20	9	—		—		—		—		20	9
Corinthians	2009	Série A	20	12	10	8	8	3	—		—		38	23
Corinthians	2010	Série A	11	6	9	3	—		7 (Note: Appearances in Copa Libertadores)	3	—		27	12
Corinthians	2011	Série A	—		2	0	—		2	0	—		4	0
Corinthians	Total		31	18	21	11	8	3	9	3	—		69	35
Career total			343	247	41	33	35	19	93	49	6	4	518	352

=== International ===
Appearances and goals by national team, year and competition
Team	Year	Competitive		Friendly		Total	
Team	Year	Apps	Goals	Apps	Goals	Apps	Goals
Brazil	1994	0	0	4	1	4	1
Brazil	1995	1 (Note: Appearance in the 1995 Copa América)	0	5	3	6	3
Brazil	1996	0	0	4	5	4	5
Brazil	1997	11 (Note: Six appearances and five goals in the 1997 Copa América, five appearances and four goals in the 1997 FIFA Confederations Cup)	9	9	6	20	15
Brazil	1998	7 (Note: Appearances in the 1998 FIFA World Cup)	4	3	1	10	5
Brazil	1999	6 (Note: Appearances in the 1999 Copa América)	5	4	2	10	7
Brazil	2000	0	0	0	0	0	0
Brazil	2001	0	0	0	0	0	0
Brazil	2002	7 (Note: Appearances in the 2002 FIFA World Cup)	8	5	3	12	11
Brazil	2003	4 (Note: Appearances in the 2006 FIFA World Cup qualification)	3	4	0	8	3
Brazil	2004	7 (Note: Appearances in the 2006 FIFA World Cup qualification)	6	4	0	11	6
Brazil	2005	4 (Note: Appearances in the 2006 FIFA World Cup qualification)	1	1	0	5	1
Brazil	2006	5 (Note: Appearances in the 2006 FIFA World Cup)	3	2	2	8	5
Brazil	2007	0	0	0	0	0	0
Brazil	2008	0	0	0	0	0	0
Brazil	2009	0	0	0	0	0	0
Brazil	2010	0	0	0	0	0	0
Brazil	2011	0	0	1	0	1	0
Total		52	39	46	23	98	62

Notes

Scores and results list Brazil's goal tally first.

Table key
‡	Goal scored by penalty

International goals by number, cap, date, venue, opponent, score, result and competition
No.	Cap	Date	Venue	Opponent	Score	Result	Competition	Ref.
1	2	4 May 1994	Estádio da Ressacada, Florianópolis, Brazil	Iceland	1–0	3–0	Friendly	
2	8	11 June 1995	Wembley Stadium, London, England	England	2–1	3–1	Umbro Cup	
3	10	11 October 1995	Estádio de Pituaçu, Salvador, Brazil	Uruguay	1–0	2–0	Friendly	
4	10	11 October 1995	Estádio de Pituaçu, Salvador, Brazil	Uruguay	2–0	2–0	Friendly	
5	11	28 August 1996	Central Dynamo Stadium, Moscow, Russia	Russia	2–2‡	2–2	Friendly	
6	13	16 October 1996	Albertão, Teresina, Brazil	Lithuania	1–0	3–1	Friendly	
7	13	16 October 1996	Albertão, Teresina, Brazil	Lithuania	2–1	3–1	Friendly	
8	13	16 October 1996	Albertão, Teresina, Brazil	Lithuania	3–1	3–1	Friendly	
9	14	18 December 1996	Vivaldão, Manaus, Brazil	Bosnia and Herzegovina	1–0	1–0	Friendly	
10	15	26 February 1997	Estádio Serra Dourada, Goiânia, Brazil	Poland	3–0	4–2	Friendly	
11	15	26 February 1997	Estádio Serra Dourada, Goiânia, Brazil	Poland	4–0	4–2	Friendly	
12	16	2 April 1997	Estádio Nacional Mané Garrincha, Brasília, Brazil	Chile	1–0	4–0	Friendly	
13	16	2 April 1997	Estádio Nacional Mané Garrincha, Brasília, Brazil	Chile	3–0	4–0	Friendly	
14	20	8 June 1997	Stade de Gerland, Lyon, France	Italy	2–3	3–3	1997 Tournoi de France	
15	22	13 June 1997	Estadio Ramón Tahuichi Aguilera, Santa Cruz, Bolivia	Costa Rica	3–0	5–0	1997 Copa América	
16	22	13 June 1997	Estadio Ramón Tahuichi Aguilera, Santa Cruz, Bolivia	Costa Rica	4–0	5–0	1997 Copa América	
17	25	22 June 1997	Estadio Ramón Tahuichi Aguilera, Santa Cruz, Bolivia	Paraguay	1–0	2–0	1997 Copa América	
18	25	22 June 1997	Estadio Ramón Tahuichi Aguilera, Santa Cruz, Bolivia	Paraguay	2–0	2–0	1997 Copa América	
19	27	29 June 1997	Estadio Hernando Siles, La Paz, Bolivia	Bolivia	2–1	3–1	1997 Copa América	
20	28	10 August 1997	Seoul Olympic Stadium, Seoul, South Korea	South Korea	1–1‡	2–1	Friendly	
21	33	19 December 1997	King Fahd International Stadium, Riyadh, Saudi Arabia	Czech Republic	2–0	2–0	1997 FIFA Confederations Cup	
22	34	21 December 1997	King Fahd International Stadium, Riyadh, Saudi Arabia	Australia	1–0	6–0	1997 FIFA Confederations Cup	
23	34	21 December 1997	King Fahd International Stadium, Riyadh, Saudi Arabia	Australia	2–0	6–0	1997 FIFA Confederations Cup	
24	34	21 December 1997	King Fahd International Stadium, Riyadh, Saudi Arabia	Australia	5–0	6–0	1997 FIFA Confederations Cup	
25	35	25 March 1998	Gottlieb-Daimler-Stadion, Stuttgart, Germany	Germany	2–1	2–1	Friendly	
26	39	16 June 1998	Stade de la Beaujoire, Nantes, France	Morocco	1–0	3–0	1998 FIFA World Cup	
27	41	27 June 1998	Parc des Princes, Paris, France	Chile	3–0‡	4–1	1998 FIFA World Cup	
28	41	27 June 1998	Parc des Princes, Paris, France	Chile	4–1	4–1	1998 FIFA World Cup	
29	43	7 July 1998	Stade Vélodrome, Marseille, France	Netherlands	1–0	1–1 (4–2 p)	1998 FIFA World Cup	
30	45	26 June 1999	Arena da Baixada, Curitiba, Brazil	Latvia	3–0	3–0	Friendly	
31	46	30 June 1999	Estadio Antonio Aranda, Ciudad del Este, Paraguay	Venezuela	1–0	7–0	1999 Copa América	
32	46	30 June 1999	Estadio Antonio Aranda, Ciudad del Este, Paraguay	Venezuela	4–0	7–0	1999 Copa América	
33	48	6 July 1999	Estadio Antonio Aranda, Ciudad del Este, Paraguay	Chile	1–0‡	1–0	1999 Copa América	
34	49	11 July 1999	Estadio Antonio Aranda, Ciudad del Este, Paraguay	Argentina	2–1	2–1	1999 Copa América	
35	51	18 July 1999	Estadio Defensores del Chaco, Asunción, Paraguay	Uruguay	3–0	3–0	1999 Copa América	
36	53	7 September 1999	Estádio Beira-Rio, Porto Alegre, Brazil	Argentina	4–1	4–2	Friendly	
37	57	25 May 2002	Bukit Jalil National Stadium, Kuala Lumpur, Malaysia	Malaysia	1–0	4–0	Friendly	
38	58	3 June 2002	Ulsan Munsu Football Stadium, Ulsan, South Korea	Turkey	1–1	2–1	2002 FIFA World Cup	
39	59	8 June 2002	Jeju World Cup Stadium, Seogwipo, South Korea	China	4–0	4–0	2002 FIFA World Cup	
40	60	13 June 2002	Suwon World Cup Stadium, Suwon, South Korea	Costa Rica	1–0	5–2	2002 FIFA World Cup	
41	60	13 June 2002	Suwon World Cup Stadium, Suwon, South Korea	Costa Rica	2–0	5–2	2002 FIFA World Cup	
42	61	17 June 2002	Noevir Stadium Kobe, Kobe, Japan	Belgium	2–0	2–0	2002 FIFA World Cup	
43	63	26 June 2002	Saitama Stadium, Saitama, Japan	Turkey	1–0	1–0	2002 FIFA World Cup	
44	64	30 June 2002	Nissan Stadium, Yokohama, Japan	Germany	1–0	2–0	2002 FIFA World Cup	
45	64	30 June 2002	Nissan Stadium, Yokohama, Japan	Germany	2–0	2–0	2002 FIFA World Cup	
46	66	20 November 2002	Seoul World Cup Stadium, Seoul, South Korea	South Korea	1–1	3–2	Friendly	
47	66	20 November 2002	Seoul World Cup Stadium, Seoul, South Korea	South Korea	2–2	3–2	Friendly	
48	70	7 September 2003	Estadio Metropolitano Roberto Meléndez, Barranquilla, Colombia	Colombia	1–0	2–1	2006 FIFA World Cup qualification	
49	74	18 November 2003	Pinheirão, Curitiba, Brazil	Uruguay	2–1	3–3	2006 FIFA World Cup qualification	
50	74	18 November 2003	Pinheirão, Curitiba, Brazil	Uruguay	3–3	3–3	2006 FIFA World Cup qualification	
51	78	2 June 2004	Mineirão, Belo Horizonte, Brazil	Argentina	1–0‡	3–1	2006 FIFA World Cup qualification	
52	78	2 June 2004	Mineirão, Belo Horizonte, Brazil	Argentina	2–0‡	3–1	2006 FIFA World Cup qualification	
53	78	2 June 2004	Mineirão, Belo Horizonte, Brazil	Argentina	3–1‡	3–1	2006 FIFA World Cup qualification	
54	81	5 September 2004	Estádio do Morumbi, São Paulo, Brazil	Bolivia	1–0	3–1	2006 FIFA World Cup qualification	
55	83	9 October 2004	Estadio José Pachencho Romero, Maracaibo, Venezuela	Venezuela	3–0	5–2	2006 FIFA World Cup qualification	
56	83	9 October 2004	Estadio José Pachencho Romero, Maracaibo, Venezuela	Venezuela	4–0	5–2	2006 FIFA World Cup qualification	
57	90	12 October 2005	Estádio Olímpico do Pará, Pará, Brazil	Venezuela	2–0	3–0	2006 FIFA World Cup qualification	
58	91	1 March 2006	Lokomotiv Stadium, Moscow, Russia	Russia	1–0	1–0	Friendly	
59	92	4 June 2006	Stade de Genève, Geneva, Switzerland	New Zealand	1–0	4–0	Friendly	
60	95	22 June 2006	Westfalenstadion, Dortmund, Germany	Japan	1–1	4–1	2006 FIFA World Cup	
61	95	22 June 2006	Westfalenstadion, Dortmund, Germany	Japan	4–1	4–1	2006 FIFA World Cup	
62	96	27 June 2006	Westfalenstadion, Dortmund, Germany	Ghana	1–0	3–0	2006 FIFA World Cup	

== Honours ==
Cruzeiro

- Campeonato Mineiro: 1994

PSV Eindhoven

- KNVB Cup: 1995–96

Barcelona

- Copa del Rey: 1996–97
- Supercopa de España: 1996
- UEFA Cup Winners' Cup: 1996–97

Inter Milan

- UEFA Cup: 1997–98
- Coppa Italia runner-up: 1999–2000

Real Madrid

- La Liga: 2002–03, 2006–07
- Supercopa de España: 2003
- Intercontinental Cup: 2002

Corinthians

- Campeonato Paulista: 2009
- Copa do Brasil: 2009

Brazil U23

- Olympic Bronze Medal: 1996

Brazil

- FIFA World Cup: 1994, 2002; runner-up: 1998
- Copa América: 1997, 1999; runner-up: 1995
- FIFA Confederations Cup: 1997

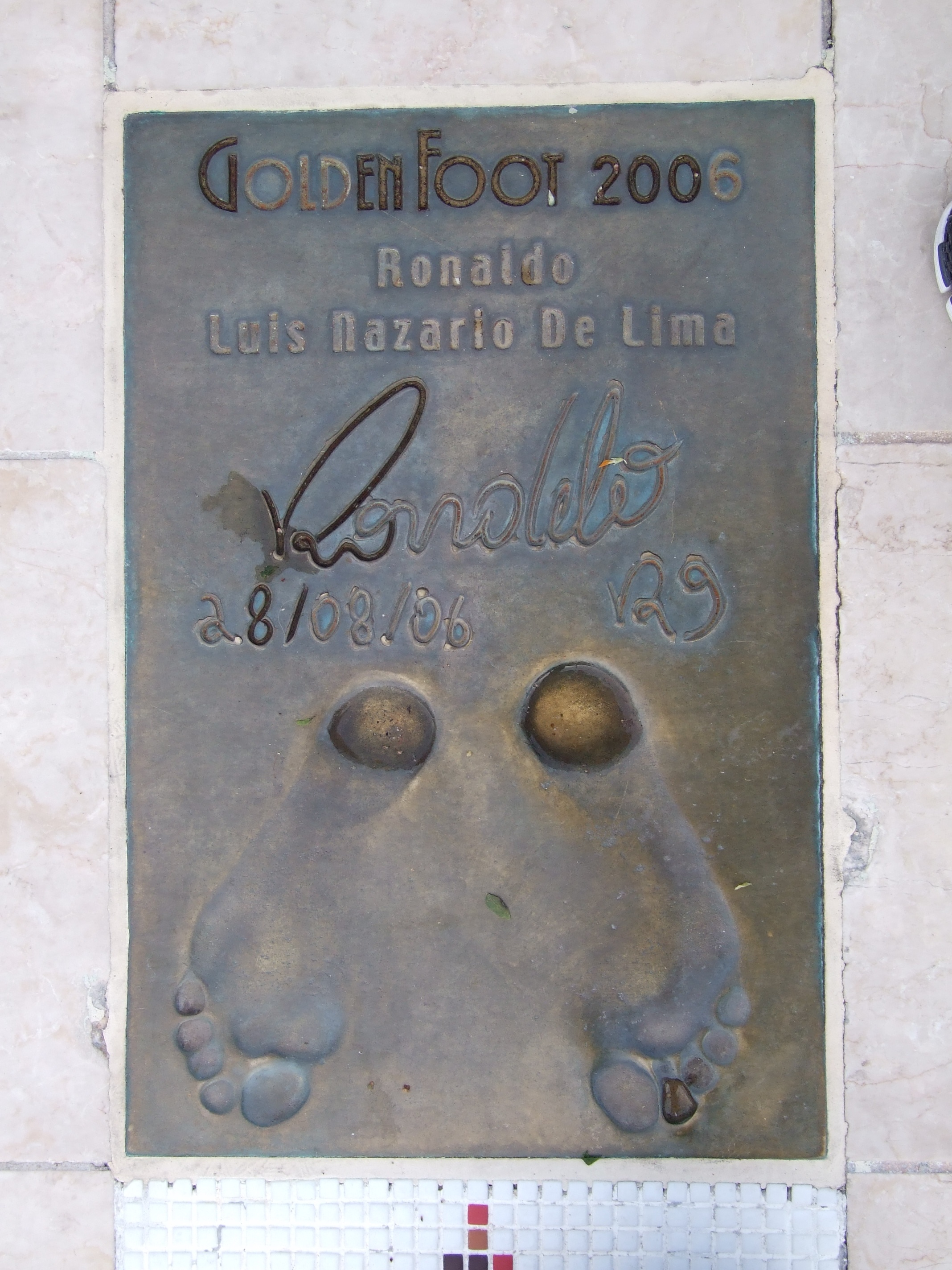
Ronaldo's Golden Foot award in "The Champions Promenade" on the seafront of the Principality of Monaco

Individual

- Supercopa Libertadores top scorer: 1993
- Supercopa Libertadores Team of the Year: 1993
- Campeonato Mineiro top scorer: 1994
- Campeonato Mineiro Team of the Year: 1994
- Eredivisie top scorer: 1994–95
- FIFA World Player of the Year: 1996, 1997, 2002
- Trofeo EFE La Liga Ibero-American Player of the Year: 1996–97, 2002–03
- Pichichi Trophy: 1996–97, 2003–04
- European Golden Shoe: 1996–97
- World Soccer magazine World Player of the Year (3): 1996, 1997, 2002
- Don Balón Award La Liga Foreign Player of the Year: 1996–97
- RSSSF Player of the Year: 1996, 1997, 2002
- Copa América Final Most Valuable Player: 1997
- Copa América Most Valuable Player: 1997
- FIFA Confederations Cup Bronze Boot: 1997
- FIFA Confederations Cup All-Star Team: 1997
- UEFA Cup Winners' Cup Final Most Valuable Player: 1997
- Copa América All-Star Team: 1997, 1999
- IFFHS World's Top Goal Scorer of the Year: 1997
- Bravo Award: 1997, 1998
- Onze d'Or: 1997, 2002
- Ballon d'Or: 1997, 2002; runner-up: 1996
- European Sports Media ESM Team of the Year: 1996–97, 1997–98
- FIFA XI: 1997, 1998
- Serie A Footballer of the Year: 1998
- Serie A Foreign Footballer of the Year: 1998
- UEFA Cup Final Most Valuable Player: 1998
- UEFA Club Footballer of the Year: 1997–98
- UEFA Club Forward of the Year: 1997–98
- FIFA World Cup Golden Ball: 1998
- FIFA World Cup All-Star Team: 1998, 2002
- FIFA World Cup top assist provider: 1998
- Inter Milan Player of the Year: 1998
- FIFA World Cup Golden Shoe: 2002
- FIFA World Cup Silver Ball: 2002
- FIFA World Cup Final Most Valuable Player: 2002
- Intercontinental Cup Most Valuable Player: 2002
- UEFA Team of the Year: 2002
- BBC World Sport Star of the Year: 2002
- Laureus World Sports Awards Comeback of the Year: 2003
- Best Male Soccer Player ESPY Award: 2003
- FIFA 100 (2004)
- FIFA World Cup Bronze Boot: 2006
- Brazilian Football Museum Hall of Fame: 2006
- Golden Foot award: 2006
- France Football magazine's all-time starting XI: 2007
- Association of Football Statisticians (AFS) Top-100 Players of All Time: 2007. #2
- Sports Illustrated Team of the Decade: 2009
- Real Madrid Hall of Fame
- Marca Leyenda: 2011
- L'Équipe's top 50 South-American footballers in history: #5
- Italian Football Hall of Fame: 2015
- International Federation of Football History & Statistics (IFFHS) Legends
- Inter Milan Hall of Fame: 2018
- Globe Soccer Awards Player Career Award: 2018
- Ballon d'Or Dream Team: 2020
- IFFHS All-time Men's Dream B-Team: 2021

== See also ==
- List of most expensive association football transfers
- List of men's footballers with 50 or more international goals
