= Best Male Soccer Player ESPY Award =

Annual athletic award

The Best Male Soccer Player ESPY Award was presented annually to the male soccer (association football) player adjudged to be the best in a given calendar year amongst those contesting the sport on the professional or international level. The award, along with the Best Female Soccer Player ESPY Award, evolved from the Best Soccer Player ESPY Award, which was awarded in 2000 and 2001, and the latter once more absorbed the gender-specific awards in 2005.

During the award's three years, the voting panel comprised variously fans, who participated through Internet balloting; sportswriters and broadcasters, sports executives, and retired sportspersons, termed collectively experts; and ESPN personalities. The ESPY Awards ceremony was conducted in June and awards conferred reflected performance and achievement over the twelve months previous to presentation.

== List of winners ==
Year	Player	National team represented	Club team represented	Position played primarily
2002	Landon Donovan	United States	San Jose Earthquakes ( (United States) Major League Soccer)	Forward
2003	Ronaldo	Brazil	Real Madrid ( (Spain) La Liga)	Forward
2004	David Beckham	England	Real Madrid ( (Spain) La Liga)	Midfielder

== See also ==
- FIFA World Player of the Year
- FIFA World Cup awards
- African Footballer of the Year
- Asian Footballer of the Year
- European Footballer of the Year
- Oceania Footballer of the Year
- South American Footballer of the Year
