= The beautiful game =

Nickname given to association football

The beautiful game (Portuguese: o jogo bonito, pronounced [u ˈʒoɡu boˈnitu]) is a nickname for association football. It was popularised by Brazilian footballer Pelé, who played from 1957 to 1977. It was a term widely used in Brazil, though the exact origin of the phrase is disputed. Stuart Hall, an English football commentator, used it in 1958. Hall admired Peter Doherty when he went to see Manchester City play at Maine Road and used the term the beautiful game to describe football as a whole. During his career, the Brazilian footballer Ronaldinho was an exponent of the jogo bonito ('play beautifully') style of play.

== Etymology ==
The exact origins of the term are disputed. The origin has been attributed to Brazilian footballer Waldyr "Didi" Pereira, and the presenter Stuart Hall claimed to have originated it in 1958. The English author and football fanatic H. E. Bates used the term earlier, including in a 1952 newspaper piece extolling the virtues of the game entitled "Brains in the Feet". Earlier writers used the term in 1848 to describe the game of baaga'adowe, a forerunner of lacrosse as played by Ojibwe at Vauxhall Gardens in London, and to tennis in 1890.

== Usage ==
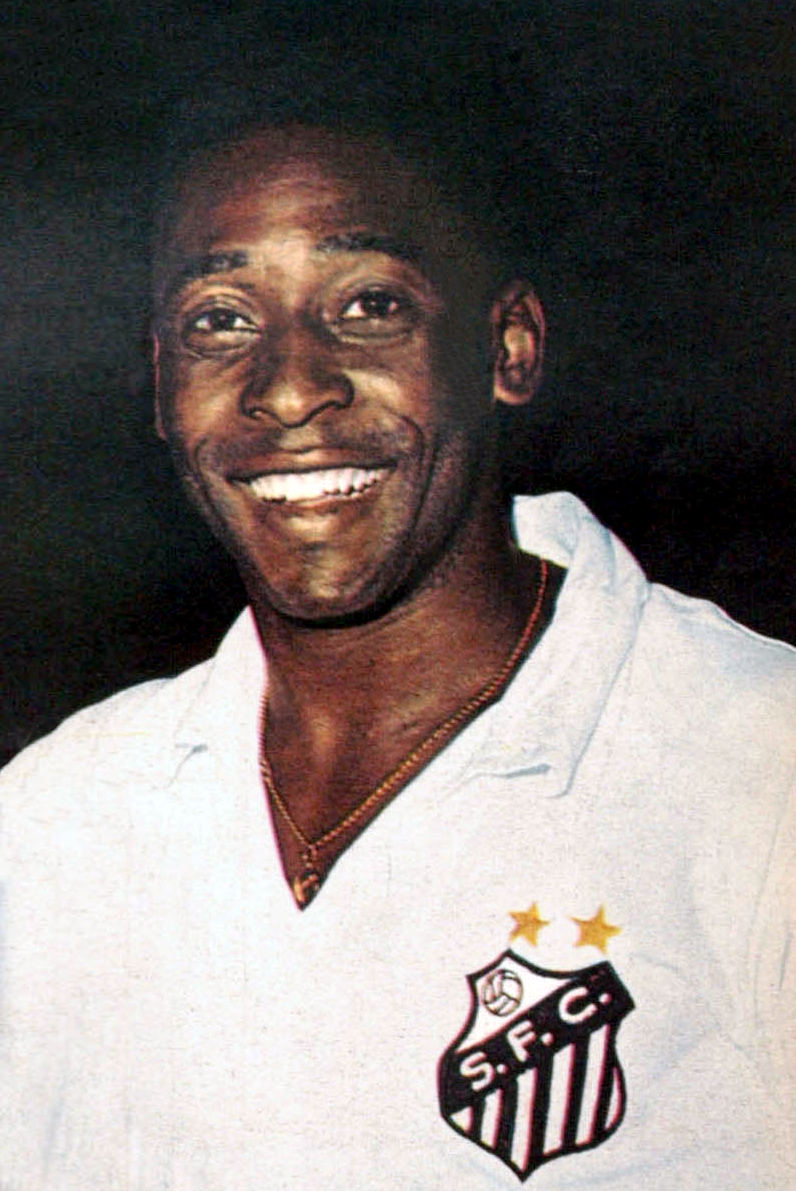
Brazilian footballer Pelé is credited to have popularised the term.

Brazilian footballer Pelé is credited with making the phrase synonymous with football. In 1977, he named his autobiography My Life and the Beautiful Game. The book's dedication reads: "I dedicate this book to all the people who have made this great game the Beautiful Game." The phrase has entered the lexicon as both a description for football and a tribute to the sport.

The Beautiful Game is the title of a 1996 album. Featuring football anthems such as "Three Lions", music writer John Harris states that the album captures how the build-up to UEFA Euro 1996 "caught the imagination of the UK's musicians." It is also referenced in the title of Andrew Lloyd Webber's 2000 musical The Beautiful Game. It is used as a title for the 13-part 2002 series charting the history of the game: History of Football: The Beautiful Game, narrated by the actor Terence Stamp. The 2016 Vulfpeck album also utilizes the phrase as its title, referencing the football outfit Jack Stratton wears in the photo used as the album cover.

The song "Wavin' Flag"—rapper K'naan's Coca-Cola promotional anthem for the 2010 World Cup in South Africa—contained the lyric "let's rejoice in the Beautiful Game". In January 2014, New Model Army released a song called "The Beautiful Game" in support of the project Spirit of Football. A football podcast was released with the title The Beautiful Game.

== Terms used ==
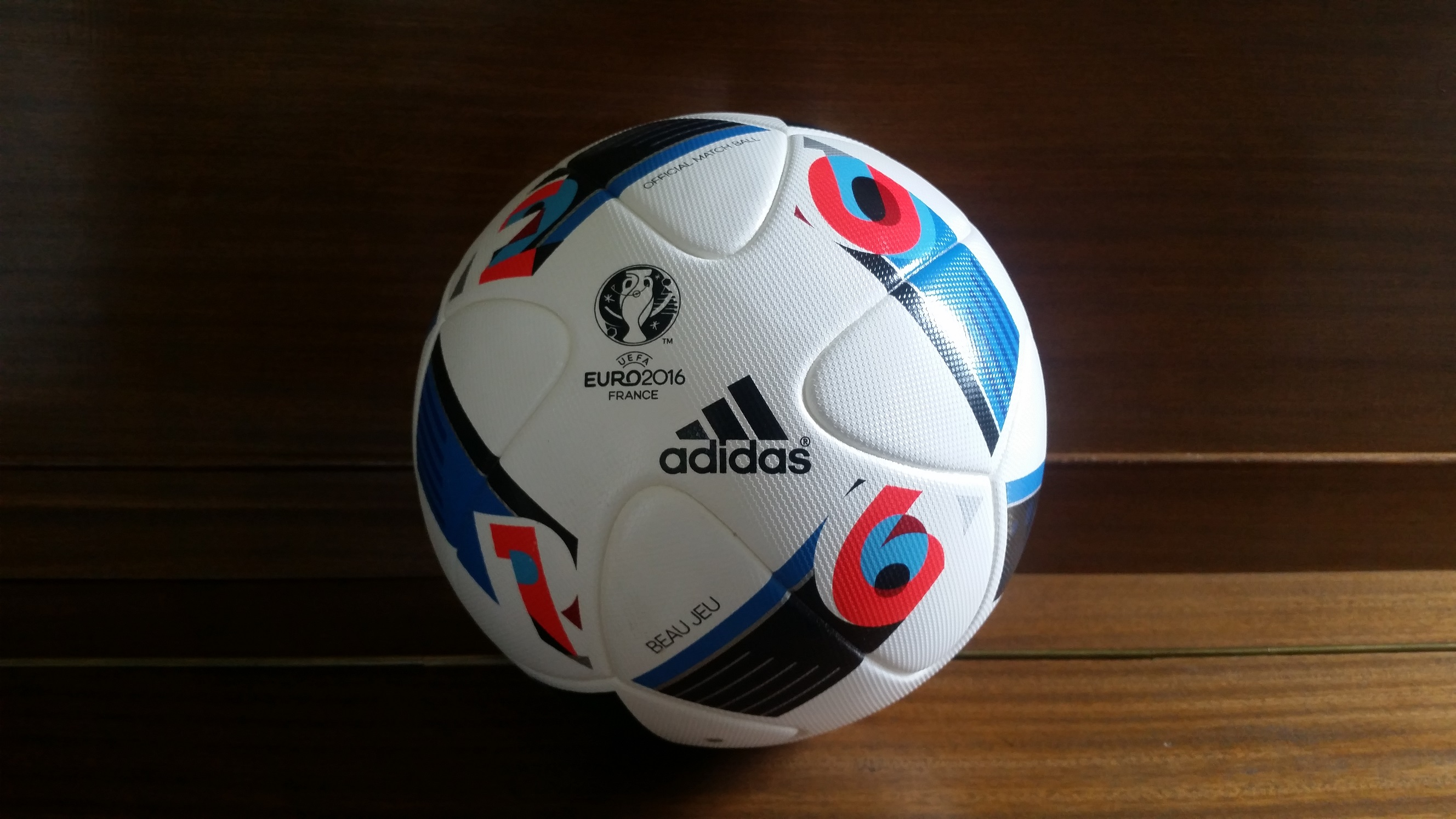
Adidas Beau Jeu, French for "Beautiful Game"

Sportswear company Nike has referenced the beautiful game in its football commercials. In 1996, a Nike commercial titled "Good vs Evil" was a gladiatorial game set in a Roman amphitheatre where ten football players from around the world, including Eric Cantona, Ronaldo, Paolo Maldini, Luís Figo, Patrick Kluivert, Ian Wright, and Jorge Campos, defend "the beautiful game" against a team of demonic warriors, which culminates in Cantona receiving the ball from Ronaldo, pulling up his shirt collar, and delivering the final line, "Au revoir", before striking the ball and destroying evil.

Nike uses the Portuguese phrase joga bonito—meaning "play beautifully" and not "beautiful game", which would be jogo bonito—as one of its slogans for football products. Nike began using the slogan joga bonito in a campaign preceding the 2006 FIFA World Cup in an attempt to curb players' behaviours on the pitch. In collaboration with and promoted by former international footballer Eric Cantona, Nike released a series of adverts to promote a game that is skillful and dignified, not riddled with theatrics and poor sportsmanship. Sportswear company Adidas also named an official match ball of UEFA Euro 2016 Adidas Beau Jeu, which translates to "The Beautiful Game" in English.

== See also ==
- Glossary of association football terms
