= Assis (disambiguation) =

Assis is a city and a municipality in São Paulo, Brazil.

Assis may also refer to:

== People ==
- Assis (footballer, born 1943), Brazilian footballer Francisco de Assis Luz Silva
- Assis (footballer, born 1952), Brazilian footballer Benedito de Assis da Silva
- Assis (footballer, born 1971), Brazilian footballer Roberto de Assis Moreira
- Assisinho (born 1987), Brazilian footballer Francisco de Assis Mota Sobrinho
- Afonso Assis (born 2006), Portuguese footballer
- Cláudio Assis, Brazilian filmmaker
- Diego Assis (disambiguation), Brazilian football players
- Éder Aleixo de Assis, former Brazilian footballer
- Francisco Assis, Portuguese politician
- Fúlvio de Assis, Brazilian professional basketball player
- João Assis (born 1983), Brazilian jiu-jitsu practitioner
- Machado de Assis, Brazilian writer
- Maicon Assis, Brazilian footballer
- Nuno Assis, Portuguese footballer
- Raymundo Damasceno Assis, Brazilian Roman Catholic cardinal, former Archbishop of Aparecida (2004-2016)
- Zezé Assis (1962–2007), Angolan basketball player

== Other uses ==
- Assisi (Portuguese: Assis), Italy, the birthplace of Saint Francis of Assisi
- Prêmio Machado de Assis, a Brazilian literary prize

== See also ==
- Assisi (disambiguation)
