= Amata (disambiguation) =

Amata is a figure in Roman mythology.

Amata may also refer to:

- Amata (moth), a genus of moths of the family Erebidae
- Amata, South Australia, a Pitjantjatjara Aboriginal community in north-western South Australia
- Amata of Assisi (d. 1250), saint
- Doreen Amata (born 1988), Nigerian high jumper
- Amata River, Latvia
- Amata Corporation, an industrial developer based in Thailand
- Amrita, "deathlessness", referred to as amata in Pāli
- 1035 Amata, an asteroid
