= João Mendes (footballer, born 2005) =

Brazilian footballer (born 2005)

Personal information
- Full name: João Mendes de Assis Moreira
- Date of birth: 25 February 2005 (age 21)
- Place of birth: Rio de Janeiro, Brazil
- Height: 1.78 m (5 ft 10 in)
- Position: Winger

Team information
- Current team: Portimonense
- Number: 77

Youth career
- Flamengo
- Vasco da Gama
- –2018: Boavista-RJ
- 2018–2022: Cruzeiro
- 2023–2024: Barcelona
- 2024–2025: Burnley
- 2025–2026: Hull City

Senior career*
Years	Team	Apps	(Gls)
2026–	Portimonense	0	(0)
- * Club domestic league appearances and goals as of 1 July 2026

João Mendes de Assis Moreira (born 25 February 2005) is a Brazilian footballer who plays as a winger for Liga Portugal 2 club Portimonense.

== Early and personal life ==
João Mendes was born in Rio de Janeiro to Brazilian footballing legend Ronaldinho and professional dancer Janaina Mendes. His uncle is former footballer Assis, while his cousin, and Assis’ son, Diego Assis also pursued a career in football.

== Club career ==
=== Early career ===
João Mendes first took an interest in football at the age of four, when he asked his mother to enroll him in a football school. At the age of ten, he joined the academy of Flamengo, before playing indoor football for Vasco da Gama, followed by a short spell with Boavista-RJ.

At the age of thirteen, he had a successful trial at Cruzeiro, where he hid the fact that his father was Ronaldinho from fellow trialists, as well as Cruzeiro staff. A year after joining, he signed his first professional contract with the club, a six-year deal, in 2019. Shortly after signing professional terms, he scored two goals for Cruzeiro at a youth tournament hosted in China.

=== Barcelona ===
In February 2022, after almost four seasons with the club, João Mendes left Cruzeiro. Having been without a club for almost a year, he went on trial with Spanish side Barcelona in January 2023. He had been linked to the Catalan club, where his father used to play, since 2020. He reportedly did not impress Barcelona coaches during his trial period, with club president, and long-time friend of Ronaldinho, Joan Laporta, requesting an extension to the trial for further technical analysis.

On 7 February 2023, at the MD Grand Gala, Ronaldinho stated "with the arrival of my son at Barça I will be even more present," seemingly confirming João Mendes' move to Barcelona. João Mendes played in a friendly match for Barcelona's under-19 team in a 3–1 win over Manchester United on 16 February 2023. Following the game, Laporta stated "we want Ronaldinho's son to continue his career here. We will make him a contract [offer]. The other day we spoke with Roberto (his agent) and he has to close some things in Brazil."

João Mendes officially signed for Barcelona on 2 March 2023, being assigned to the youth team.

=== Burnley ===
On 14 August 2024, Mendes was photographed holding a Burnley jersey alongside his agent. Reputable reports circulated claiming he had penned a two-year contract with the club. After just one season with Burnley, it was reported on 20 May 2025 that he would be released early.

=== Hull City ===
On 11 September 2025, Mendes joined the academy of Championship club Hull City. On 10 June 2026, Hull said it was releasing the player.

=== Portimonense ===
On 6 August 2026, Mendes joined Liga Portugal 2 side Portimonense.

== International career ==
João Mendes holds a Spanish passport, making him eligible to represent Spain, as well as his nation of birth Brazil.
