= Assisi (disambiguation) =

Assisi is a town and commune in Italy.

Assisi may also refer to:

- Assisi Catholic College, on the Gold Coast in Upper Coomera, Queensland, Australia
- Assisi Hospice, Singapore
- Assisi Animal Sanctuary, Conlig, County Down, Northern Ireland
- Assisi Nagar, a neighbourhood of Chennai, India
- Assisi embroidery, a form of counted-thread embroidery
- Assisi (meteorite), which fell to earth in 1886 at Umbria, Italy
- Sergio Assisi (born 1972), Italian actor

== See also ==
- Rufinus of Assisi (fl. 3rd century), Italian saint and first bishop of Assisi
- Francis of Assisi (1181/82–1226), Italian Catholic saint, friar, deacon and preacher
- Giles of Assisi (c. 1190–1262), one of the original companions of Francis of Assisi
- Clare of Assisi (1194–1253), Italian saint and founder of the Order of Poor Ladies, one of the first followers of Francis of Assisi
- Agnes of Assisi (1197/1198–1253), Italian saint and abbess, younger sister of Clare of Assisi
- Amata of Assisi (died 1250), Italian nun, niece of Clare of Assisi
- Vitalis of Assisi (1295–1370), Italian saint, hermit and monk
