= Diego Assis =

Diego Assis may refer to:

- Diego Assis (footballer, born 1987), Brazilian footballer
- Diego Assis (footballer, born 1994), Brazilian footballer
