= 2013 South American Footballer of the Year =

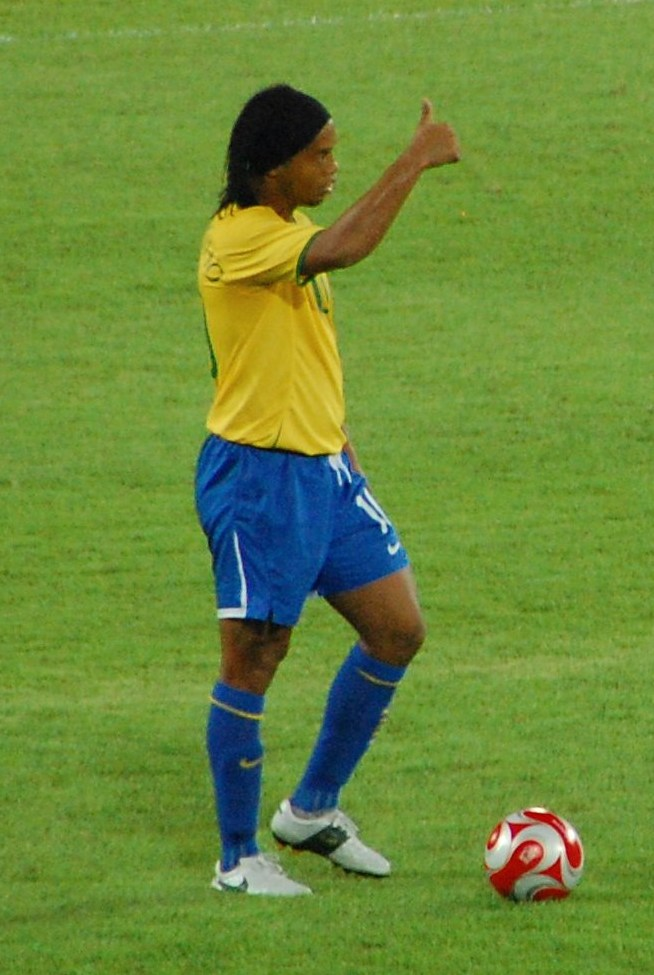
Ronaldinho is the South American Footballer of the Year for 2013.

The 2013 South American Footballer of the Year, given to the best football player in South America by Uruguayan newspaper El País through voting by journalists across the continent, was awarded to Ronaldinho of Atlético Mineiro on December 31, 2013.

== Rankings ==
Rank	Player	Nationality	Club	Points
1	Ronaldinho	Brazil	(Brazil) Atlético Mineiro	156
2	Neymar^{1}	Brazil	(Brazil) Santos	81
3	Maxi Rodríguez	Argentina	(Argentina) Newell's Old Boys	79
4	Everton Ribeiro	Brazil	(Brazil) Cruzeiro	8
5	Jô	Brazil	(Brazil) Atlético Mineiro	6
6	Éderson	Brazil	(Brazil) Atlético Paranaense	5
7	Jefferson Montero	Ecuador	(Mexico) Morelia	4
8	Pablo Velázquez	Paraguay	(Mexico) Toluca	2
9	Paulinho^{1}	Brazil	(Brazil) Corinthians	1
9	Diego Forlán	Uruguay	(Brazil) Internacional	1
9	Victor	Brazil	(Brazil) Atlético Mineiro	1
9	Bernard^{1}	Brazil	(Brazil) Atlético Mineiro	1

^{1}Players who have been to Europe before ending the season.
