= Ronaldinho =

Brazilian footballer (born 1980)

- Ronaldinho in 2019

Personal information
- Full name: Ronaldo de Assis Moreira
- Date of birth: 21 March 1980 (age 46)
- Place of birth: Porto Alegre, Rio Grande do Sul, Brazil
- Height: 1.82 m (6 ft 0 in)
- Positions: Attacking midfielder; left winger

Team information
- Current team: Ravenna
- Number: 10

Youth career
- 1987–1998: Grêmio

Senior career*
Years	Team	Apps	(Gls)
1998–2001	Grêmio	89	(47)
2001–2003	Paris Saint-Germain	55	(17)
2003–2008	Barcelona	145	(70)
2008–2011	AC Milan	76	(20)
2011–2012	Flamengo	56	(23)
2012–2014	Atlético Mineiro	58	(20)
2014–2015	Querétaro	25	(8)
2015	Fluminense	7	(0)
2026–	Ravenna	1	(0)

International career
1997	Brazil U17	13	(3)
1998–1999	Brazil U20	17	(8)
1999–2000	Brazil U23	19	(15)
2008	Brazil Olympic (O.P.)	8	(3)
1999–2013	Brazil	97	(33)
Medal record
Men's football
Representing Brazil
FIFA World Cup
Winner	2002 Korea/Japan
FIFA Confederations Cup
Winner	2005 Germany
Runner-up	1999 Mexico
Copa América
Winner	1999 Paraguay
Olympic Games
Bronze medal – third place	2008 Beijing	Team
CONMEBOL Pre-Olympic Tournament
Winner	2000 Brazil
South American U-20 Championship
Third place	1999 Argentina
FIFA U-17 World Cup
Winner	1997 Egypt
South American U-17 Championship
Winner	1997 Paraguay
- * Club domestic league appearances and goals as of 23:57, 15 November 2026 (UTC)

Ronaldo de Assis Moreira (born 21 March 1980), commonly known as Ronaldinho Gaúcho or simply Ronaldinho, (Note: Brazilian Portuguese: [ʁonawˈdʒĩɲu ɡaˈuʃu]; "Ronaldinho", the lengthened term of endearment for "Ronaldo", is accompanied in Brazilian usage by the nickname "Gaúcho" (the demonym for people of Rio Grande do Sul). This was done in order to distinguish him from fellow footballer and countryman Ronaldo or Ronaldo Nazário, who was also known as "Ronaldinho" in Brazil beforehand. Ronaldo Nazário went by his first name upon his move to Europe, thereby allowing Ronaldinho to drop the "Gaúcho" nickname abroad.) is a Brazilian professional footballer who plays as an attacking midfielder or left winger for Serie C club Ravenna. Widely regarded as one of the greatest players of all time, he is the only player in history to have won a FIFA World Cup, a Copa América, a FIFA Confederations Cup, a UEFA Champions League, a Copa Libertadores and a Ballon d'Or in his career. Nicknamed "O Bruxo" ("The Wizard"), Ronaldinho was renowned for his dribbling abilities, free-kick accuracy, his use of tricks, feints, and passing, as well as his ability to score and create goals.

Ronaldinho made his professional debut for Grêmio in 1998. At age 20, he transferred to Paris Saint-Germain, where he became a prominent member of the squad and appeared in the 2003 Coupe de France final. In 2003, he signed with Barcelona, winning his first FIFA World Player of the Year award during the club's 2004–05 La Liga championship campaign. The following season, he was integral to Barcelona achieving a double of the La Liga and UEFA Champions League titles. His two goals in a 3–0 El Clásico victory against Real Madrid made him the first Barcelona player since Diego Maradona (1983) to receive a standing ovation at the Bernabéu. For his performances during this period, he received the 2005 Ballon d'Or and a second consecutive FIFA World Player of the Year award. Observers and analysts frequently credit his tenure with initiating a period of competitive resurgence for Barcelona.

During the 2006–07 season, Ronaldinho helped Barcelona secure the Supercopa de España, though the team underperformed overall by missing out on the league title and suffering an early European exit. Following a 2007–08 season in which Barcelona failed to win any major trophies, Ronaldinho concluded his tenure with the club and transferred to AC Milan. In his second season, Ronaldinho recorded a league-high 15 assists in Serie A, contributing effectively before the club secured the 2010–11 Serie A championship title. During his time at Milan, World Soccer voted him World Player of the Decade 2000s, ahead of Lionel Messi and Cristiano Ronaldo. He subsequently returned to Brazil to join Flamengo in 2011, moving to Atlético Mineiro a year later, where he won the 2013 Copa Libertadores. He later moved to Mexico to feature for Querétaro before returning home for a stint with Fluminense in 2015. In 2026, he returned to professional football, signing as a player and minority shareholder for the Italian club Ravenna.

In his international career with Brazil, Ronaldinho earned 97 caps, scored 33 goals, and represented them in two FIFA World Cups. After debuting with a 1999 Copa América title, Ronaldinho became a core part of Brazil's 2002 FIFA World Cup victory. Positioned alongside Ronaldo and Rivaldo in the team's attacking trio, his performances earned him a spot in the World Cup All-Star Team. He later captained Brazil to the 2005 FIFA Confederations Cup title, where he was named Man of the Match in the final, and led the Olympic squad to a bronze medal at the 2008 Summer Olympics. He shares the record for the most goals in FIFA Confederations Cup history with Mexican striker Cuauhtémoc Blanco, with both having scored nine goals. Ronaldinho was included in the UEFA Team of the Year and the FIFA World XI three times each, and was named UEFA Club Footballer of the Year for the 2005–06 season and South American Footballer of the Year in 2013; in 2004, he was named by Pelé in the FIFA 100 list of the world's greatest living players.

During the height of his career, Ronaldinho became the world's highest-paid footballer through commercial endorsements, surpassing David Beckham in 2006. He secured the same top spot in 2007, earning an estimated $29.5 million (€23.5 million) annually. He signed a long-term contract with the sportswear company Nike, becoming a primary figure in its global "Jogo Bonito" campaign. As part of this partnership, he featured in a 2005 advertisement that became the first video to reach one million views on YouTube. He also served as the primary global cover athlete for EA Sports' FIFA video game series, appearing on nine total covers between 2003 and 2009, including the Italian edition of FIFA 10.

== Early life ==
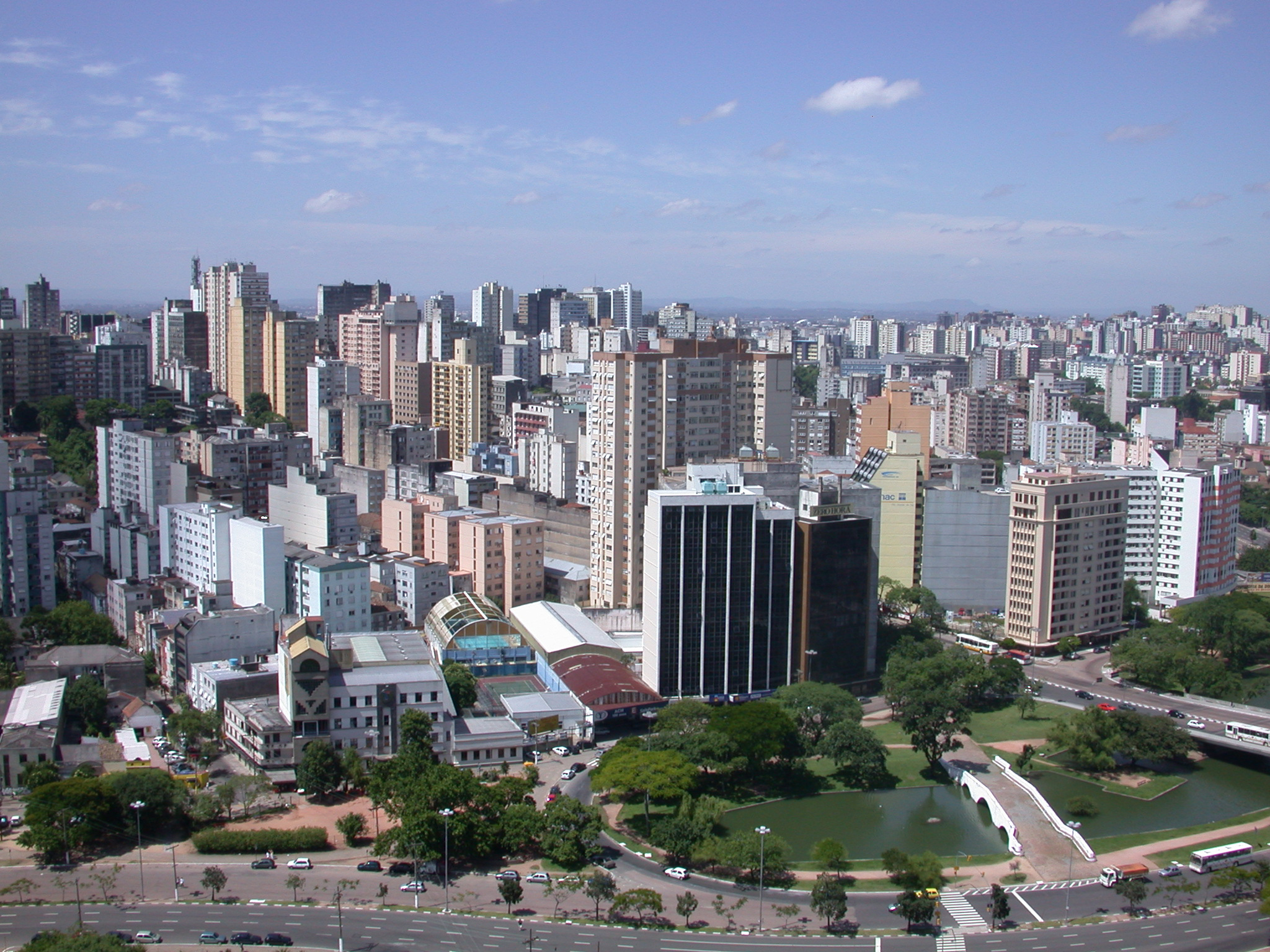
Born in Porto Alegre in 1980, Ronaldinho moved into an affluent suburb at the age of eight.

Ronaldo de Assis Moreira was born on 21 March 1980 in the city of Porto Alegre, the state capital of Rio Grande do Sul, Brazil. His mother, Miguelina Elói Assis dos Santos, was a salesperson who studied to become a nurse. His father, João de Assis Moreira, was a shipyard worker and a footballer for the local club Esporte Clube Cruzeiro (not to be confused with the larger Cruzeiro Esporte Clube). After Ronaldo's elder brother Roberto signed with Grêmio, the family moved to a home in the more affluent Guarujá section of Porto Alegre, which was a gift from Grêmio to convince Roberto to stay at the club. Still, Roberto's career was ultimately cut short by injury. When Ronaldo was eight years old, his father hit his head and drowned in the swimming pool at their new home. Roberto has acted as Ronaldo's manager, while his sister Deisi has worked as his press coordinator.

Ronaldo's football skills began to blossom at the age of eight, and he was first given the nickname Ronaldinho—inho, meaning 'small', also a term of endearment — because he was often the youngest and the smallest player in youth club matches. He developed an interest in futsal and beach football, which later expanded to organized football. Many of his signature moves originate from futsal, especially his ball control. His first brush with the media came at the age of 13, when he scored all 23 goals in a 23–0 victory against a local team. Ronaldinho was identified as a rising star at the 1997 U-17 World Championship in Egypt, in which he scored two goals on penalty kicks.

Growing up, Ronaldinho's idols included the World Cup–winning stars Rivelino (from 1970); Diego Maradona (from 1986); Romário (from 1994); and his two future international teammates Ronaldo and Rivaldo (who would, together with him, form the attacking trio in Brazil's 2002 World Cup–winning team).

== Club career ==
=== Grêmio ===
"I've worked with some great players in my time and all at a very interesting period in their careers, nineteen to twenty years old. But, with due respect to the others, Ronaldinho was a cut above the rest."

— Grêmio coach Celso Roth.

Ronaldinho's career began with the Grêmio youth squad. He made his senior side debut during the 1998 Copa Libertadores. 1999 saw the emergence of the 18-year-old Ronaldinho, with 22 goals in 47 matches, and he put in headlining displays in derbies against Internacional, most notably on 20 June 1999 in the Rio Grande do Sul State Championship final. In a match-winning performance, Ronaldinho embarrassed Internacional's Brazilian legend and 1994 World Cup-winning captain Dunga, flicking the ball over his head on one occasion, and leaving him flat-footed in a mazy dribble on another. Ronaldinho achieved further success with Grêmio, winning the inaugural Copa Sul.

In 2001, Arsenal expressed interest in signing Ronaldinho, but the move collapsed after he could not obtain a work permit because he was a non-EU player who had not played enough international matches. He considered playing on loan with Scottish Premier League side St Mirren, which never happened due to his involvement in a fake passport scandal in Brazil.

=== Paris Saint-Germain ===
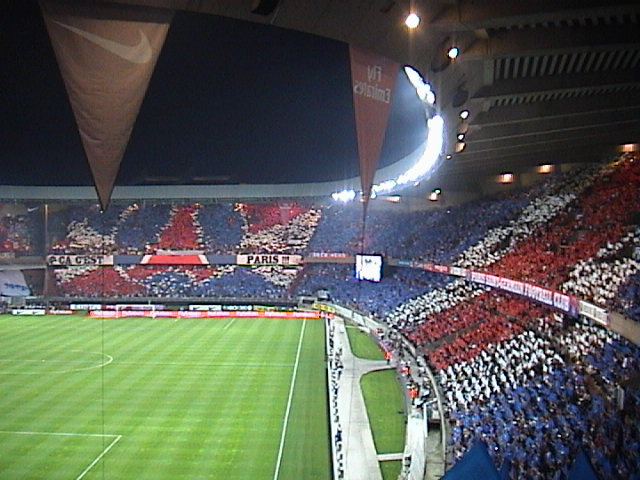
Ronaldinho arrived at the Parc des Princes (pictured) to much fanfare.

In 2001, Ronaldinho signed a five-year contract with French club Paris Saint-Germain in a €5 million transfer. Upon his arrival in Paris, Ronaldinho was given the number 21 shirt and inserted into a lineup that included fellow Brazilian Aloísio, midfielder Jay-Jay Okocha and striker Nicolas Anelka.

==== 2001–02 season ====
Ronaldinho made his league debut for the club on 4 August 2001, appearing as a substitute in a 1–1 draw with Auxerre. Ronaldinho spent the majority of the first few months of the 2001–02 season alternated between the bench and starter's role. He scored his first goal for the club on 13 October in a 2–2 draw against Lyon, converting the equalizing penalty in the 79th minute after having come on ten minutes prior. After returning from the winter break, Ronaldinho went on a tear, scoring a goal in four consecutive matches to open the new campaign. He recorded impressive goals against Monaco, Rennes, Lens and Lorient. On 16 March 2002, he recorded a double in PSG's 3–1 victory against relegation strugglers Troyes. He scored his final league goal of the season in the club's 2–0 win over Metz on 27 April.

Ronaldinho was also influential in the 2001–02 Coupe de la Ligue, helping PSG reach the semi-finals where they were eliminated by Bordeaux. In a Round of 16 match against Guingamp, Ronaldinho scored two second-half goals in the game after having entered the match as a half-time substitute. Despite Ronaldinho's initial success with the club, the season was marred by controversy with Paris Saint-Germain manager Luis Fernández, claiming that the Brazilian was too focused on the Parisian nightlife rather than football, and complained that his holidays in Brazil never ended at the scheduled times.

==== 2002–03 season ====
Despite repeated rifts with Fernández, Ronaldinho returned to the team for the 2002–03 season, with the player switching to the number 10 shirt. Although his performances in his second season with the club were underwhelming compared to his first, Ronaldinho performed admirably with the club. On 26 October 2002, he scored two goals in PSG's 3–1 victory over Classique rivals Marseille. The first goal was a free kick, which curled past numerous Marseille players in the 18-yard box before sailing past goalkeeper Vedran Runje. In the return match, he again scored in PSG's 3–0 victory at the Stade Vélodrome, running half the length of the field before flicking the ball over the goalkeeper. On 22 February 2003, Ronaldinho scored the goal of the season (chosen by public vote) against Guingamp—he beat one opponent before playing a one-two to beat another, then lifted the ball over a third before beating a fourth with a step over (dropping his shoulder, moving right but going left) and finished by lifting the ball over the goalkeeper.

Ronaldinho was also praised for his performance in the Coupe de France when he scored both goals in the club's 2–0 win over Bordeaux in the semi-finals, which inserted PSG into the final. After scoring his first goal in the 22nd minute, Ronaldinho capped the game in the 81st minute, accurately chipping the ball at the 18-yard box over the head of goalkeeper Ulrich Ramé, despite Ramé being in a favorable position. For his performance, Ronaldinho was given a standing ovation by the Parisian supporters. Unfortunately for the club, however, Ronaldinho and the team failed to capture the form that got them to the final as they bowed out 2–1 to Auxerre due to a last-minute goal from Jean-Alain Boumsong. Despite Ronaldinho's performances, the club finished in a disappointing 11th-placed position. Following the season, Ronaldinho declared he wanted to leave the club after the capital club failed to qualify for any European competition.

=== Barcelona ===
"Ronaldinho was responsible for the change in Barça. It was a bad time and the change that came about with his arrival was amazing."

— Lionel Messi on the impact of Ronaldinho's arrival at Barcelona.

Newly elected FC Barcelona president Joan Laporta stated, "I said we would lead Barça to the forefront of the footballing world, and for that to occur we had to sign one of these three players, David Beckham, Thierry Henry or Ronaldinho." Henry remained with Arsenal, and Laporta then promised to bring Beckham to the club, but following his transfer to Real Madrid, Barcelona entered the running for Ronaldinho and outbid Manchester United for his signature in a €30 million deal.

==== 2003–04 season ====
At the club where he would spend his peak years and the basis of his global fame, Ronaldinho made his Barcelona debut in a friendly against Juventus at Gillette Stadium in Foxborough, Massachusetts on 27 July, with coach Frank Rijkaard stating post match, "He has something special every time he touches the ball." He scored his first competitive goal in La Liga on 3 September 2003 against Sevilla at 1.30 a.m. local time, in a match that kicked off at five minutes past midnight. After receiving the ball from his goalkeeper inside his own half, Ronaldinho ran through the midfield and dribbled past two Sevilla players before striking the ball from 30 yards which hammered off the underside of the crossbar and back up into the roof of the net. Ronaldinho suffered from injury during the first half of the campaign, and Barcelona slumped to 12th in the league standings midway through the season. Ronaldinho returned from injury and scored 15 goals in La Liga during the 2003–04 season, helping the team ultimately finish second in the league. His scooped pass set up the winning goal for Xavi away to Real Madrid on 25 April 2004, the club's first win at the Bernabéu in seven years, a result Xavi credits as the start of "the Barcelona rise".

==== 2004–05 season ====
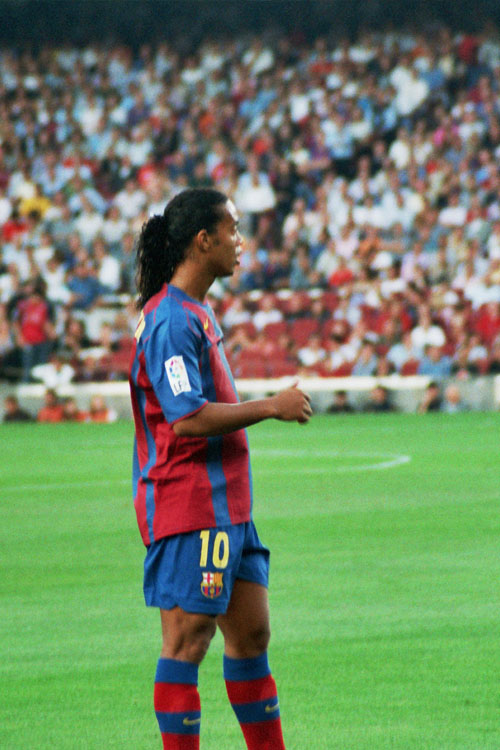
Ronaldinho during a match against Numancia in October 2004

Ronaldinho won his first league title in 2004–05, and was named FIFA World Player of the Year on 20 December 2004. His captain at Barcelona, Carles Puyol, stated, "The greatest compliment I could give him is that he's given Barcelona our spirit back. He has made us smile again." Ronaldinho's fame grew due to his entertaining and productive play in both the La Liga and the UEFA Champions League. On 8 March 2005, Barcelona were eliminated from the latter competition by Chelsea in the first knockout round, losing 5–4 over two legs. Ronaldinho scored both goals in the 4–2 second leg loss at Stamford Bridge in London, the second a spectacular strike where he feinted to shoot before striking the ball with little back-lift past Chelsea goalkeeper Petr Čech from 20 yards out.

It's like someone pressed pause and for three seconds all the players stopped and I'm the only one that moves.

— Ronaldinho reflects on his toe-poke goal against Chelsea.

On 1 May 2005, Ronaldinho made the assist for Lionel Messi's first goal for Barcelona, executing a scooped pass over the Albacete defence for Messi to finish. With his contract expiring in 2008, Ronaldinho was offered an extension until 2014 that would have net him £85 million over nine years, but he turned it down. In September 2005, he signed a two-year extension that contained a minimum-fee release clause that allowed him to leave should a club make an offer to Barcelona of at least £85 million for him.

==== 2005–06 season ====
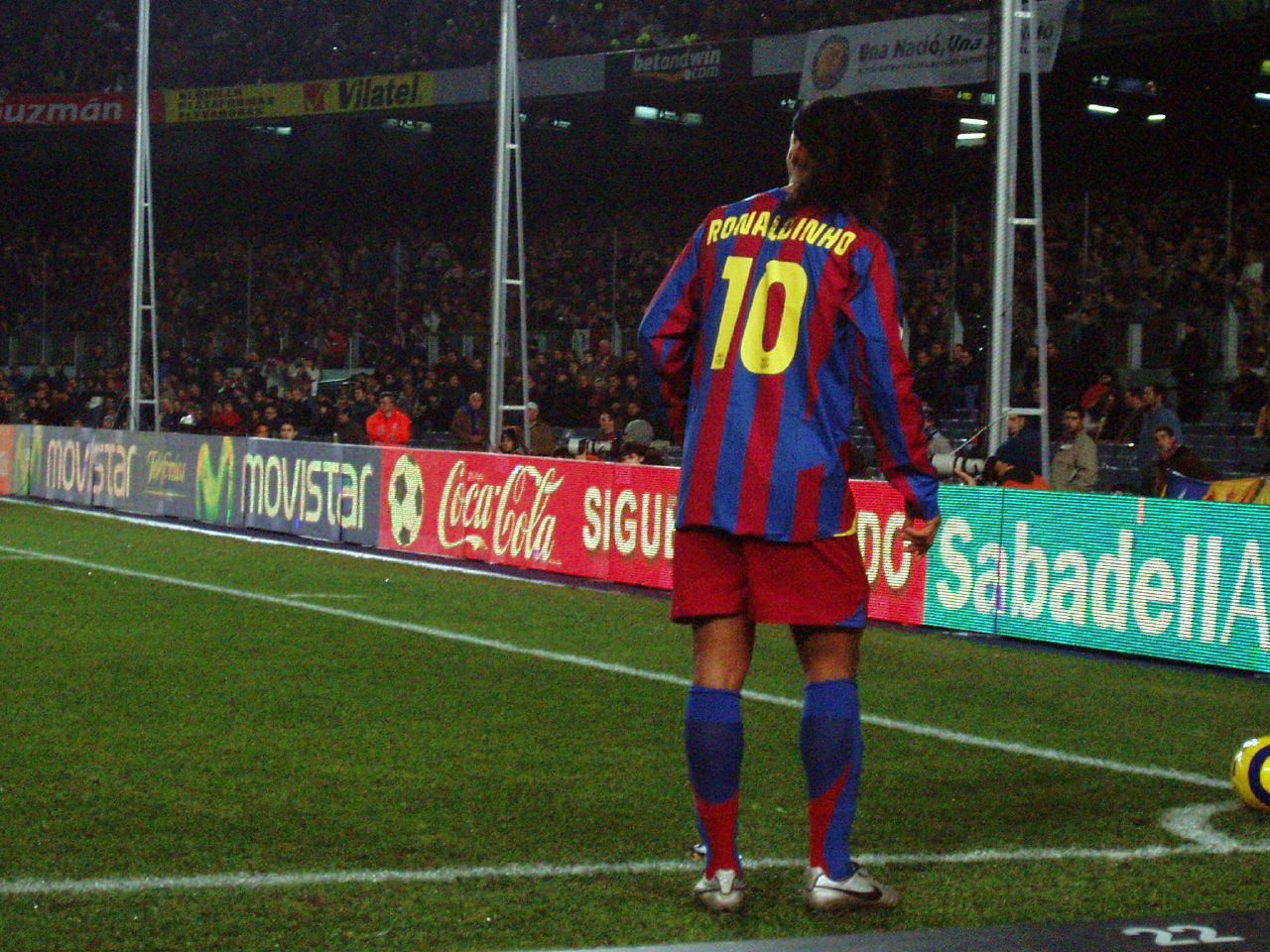
Ronaldinho taking a corner kick against Celta de Vigo at the Camp Nou in December 2005

By the end of the year 2005, Ronaldinho had started to accumulate a host of personal awards. He won the inaugural FIFPro Player of the Season in September 2005, which was concluded from votes from over 40,000 footballers around the world. He was also included in the 2005 FIFPro World XI and was named the 2005 European Footballer of the Year. Also that year, Ronaldinho was voted the FIFA World Player of the Year for the second consecutive year. He became only the third player to win the award more than once, after three-time winners Ronaldo and Zinedine Zidane. His domination as the world's best footballer was undisputed as he also won the prestigious Ballon d'Or for the only time in his career.

On 19 November, Ronaldinho scored twice as Barcelona defeated Real Madrid 3–0 on the road in the first leg of El Clásico. After he sealed the match with his second goal, Madrid fans paid homage to his performance by applauding, so rare a tribute only Diego Maradona had ever been granted previously as a Barcelona player at the Santiago Bernabéu Stadium. Ronaldinho stated, "I will never forget this because it is very rare for any footballer to be applauded in this way by the opposition fans."

"He transmits a lot of joy and pleasure playing the game, and he has individual skills that are of such a high level that everybody in the world adores him."

— Barcelona coach Frank Rijkaard on Ronaldinho during the 2005–06 season.

The season is considered one of the best in Ronaldinho's career as he was an instrumental part of Barcelona's first Champions League title in 14 years. After winning their group convincingly, Barcelona faced Chelsea in the round of 16 for a rematch of the previous year. Ronaldinho scored a decisive goal in the second leg, going past three Chelsea defenders on the edge of the penalty area before beating the goalkeeper, sealing Barcelona's qualification to the next round. He also contributed one goal in Barcelona's elimination of Benfica in the quarter-finals with a 2–0 home victory. After a 1–0 semi-final aggregate win over Milan, in which Ronaldinho assisted the series' only goal by Ludovic Giuly, Barcelona progressed to the Champions League Final, which they won on 17 May 2006 with a 2–1 beating of Arsenal. Two weeks earlier, Barcelona had clinched their second-straight La Liga title with a 1–0 win over Celta de Vigo, giving Ronaldinho his first career double.

Throughout the season, Ronaldinho linked up with prolific Cameroonian striker Samuel Eto'o in attack, providing a number of assists to the 34 goal striker; Ronaldinho's pass also put Eto'o through on goal in the Champions League Final from which he was brought down by Arsenal goalkeeper Jens Lehmann who was sent off. Ronaldinho finished the season with a career-best 26 goals, including seventeen in La Liga and seven in the Champions League, and was chosen for the UEFA Team of the Year for the third consecutive time and was named the 2005–06 UEFA Club Footballer of the Year. He was named in the six-man shortlist for the 2006 Laureus World Sportsman of the Year, and was selected in the FIFA World XI.

==== 2006–07 season ====
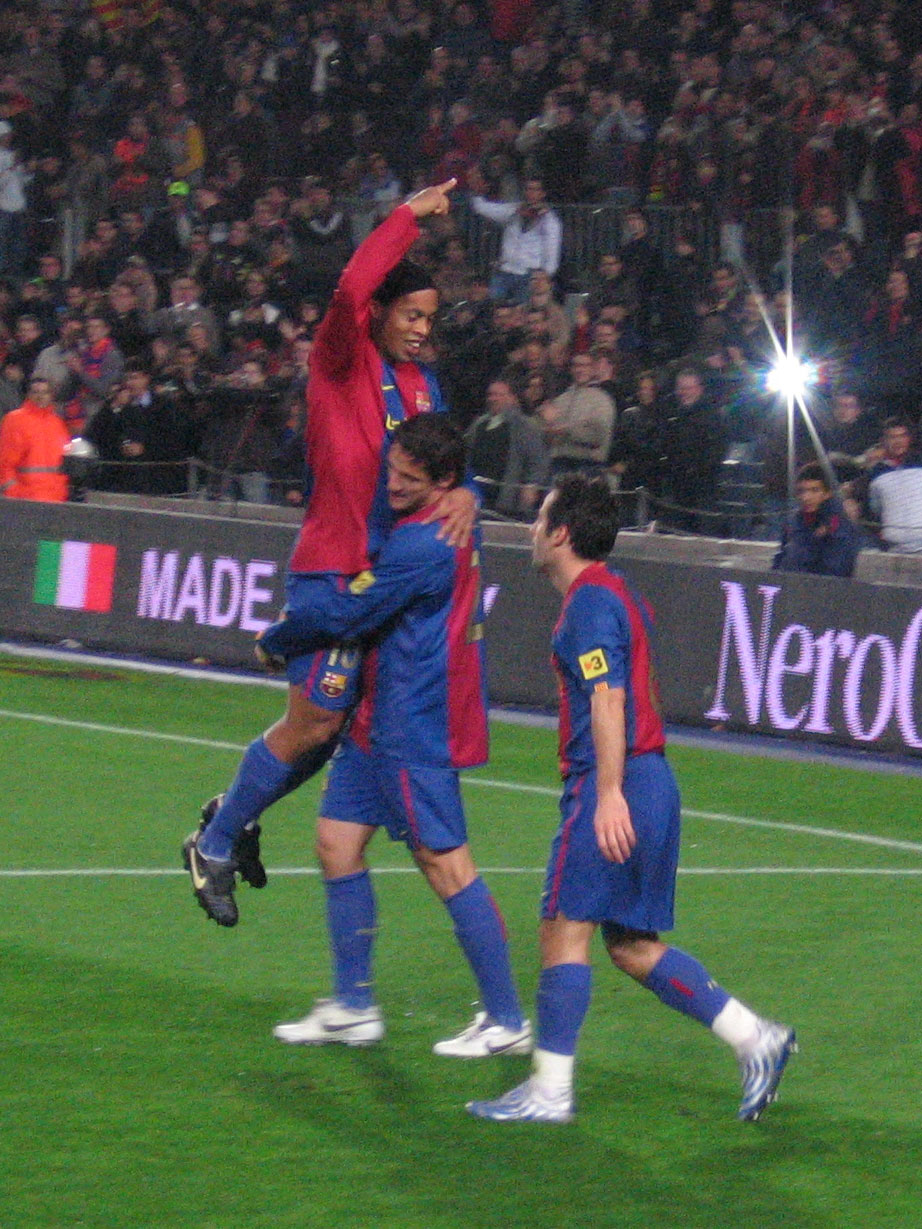
Ronaldinho being lifted by teammate Juliano Belletti after scoring against Real Sociedad in December 2006

In early November 2006, Ronaldinho was named the FIFPro Player of the Season for the second consecutive year. On 25 November, he scored his 50th career league goal against Villarreal, then scored a second time with a spectacular overhead bicycle kick; receiving Xavi's cross, he flicked the ball up with his chest and spun 180 degrees to finish—Barcelona fans waved white handkerchiefs in admiration of the goal. After the match, he told reporters that the latter was a goal he had dreamed of scoring since he was a boy. He scored once and set up two others in Barcelona's 4–0 Club World Cup win over Mexico's Club América on 14 December in Yokohama, Japan, but Barcelona were defeated 1–0 by Brazilian club Internacional in the final. Ronaldinho was the recipient of the Bronze Ball Award for the competition.

The next day, Ronaldinho finished third in the 2006 FIFA World Player of the Year, behind 2006 World Cup-winning captain Fabio Cannavaro and Zinedine Zidane. In March 2007, defending champions Barcelona were eliminated from the Champions League at the last 16 stage by Liverpool. Ronaldinho was forced to miss a charity match on 13 March due to an injury he had picked up several days earlier in Barcelona's 3–3 El Clásico draw with Real Madrid. Although Ronaldinho scored his career-best 21 league goals, the team lost the title to Real with a worse head-to-head record, as both teams finished the season with the same number of points.

==== 2007–08 season ====
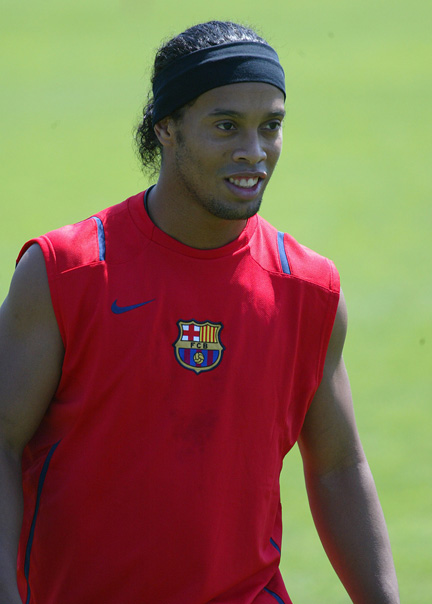
After winning every major trophy in the sport, Ronaldinho started to lose focus, partying more and training less, and was sold by Barcelona.

Ronaldinho played his 200th career match for Barcelona in a league match against Osasuna on 3 February 2008. His 2007–08 campaign as a whole, however, was plagued by injuries, and a muscle tear in his right leg on 3 April prematurely ended his season. Having been a model professional and devoted himself to training during his hugely successful first three seasons at Barcelona, Ronaldinho's partying lifestyle and lack of dedication to training saw his physical condition decline, with many at the club believing he was already below his prime. On 19 May 2008, Barcelona club president Joan Laporta stated that Ronaldinho needed a "new challenge", claiming that he needed a new club if he were to revive his career.

Ronaldinho joined Barca as a toothy-grinned wizard who had the club under his spell for three glorious seasons. He will leave a rather forlorn figure. Whether his magic has been exhausted or he just needs a new challenge remains to be seen.

— Simon Baskett, Reuters, July 2008.

Ronaldinho and Barcelona teammate Lionel Messi each captained a team of international stars in an anti-racism exhibition match in Venezuela on 28 June, which ended in a 7–7 draw. Ronaldinho finished with a pair of goals and two assists in what would be his last match as a Barcelona player. In preparation for the 2010 Joan Gamper Trophy, Ronaldinho sent an open letter to the fans and players of Barcelona, stating that his best years had been the five he spent in the Catalan club. It was a sad moment for him and he later said in an interview that he regretted leaving without playing long enough with Messi.

=== AC Milan ===
In July 2008, Ronaldinho turned down a £25.5 million offer from Manchester City of the Premier League, with purported wages of £200000 per week on offer, to join Italian Serie A giants AC Milan on a three-year contract thought to be worth around £5.1 million (€6.5 million) a year, for €22.05 million plus €1.05 million bonus each season (€24.15 million in 2010). With the number 10 already occupied by teammate Clarence Seedorf, he selected 80 as his jersey number in tribute to his date of birth.

==== 2008–09 season ====
Ronaldinho scored his first goal for Milan in a 1–0 derby victory over Inter Milan on 28 September. His first brace was in a 3–0 win over Sampdoria on 19 October. He scored a 93rd-minute match-winner against Braga in the UEFA Cup group stage on 6 November. Ronaldinho finished the 2008–09 season at Milan with 10 goals from 32 appearances in all competitions. After a good start to the season, Ronaldinho struggled with fitness, and was often played from the bench to end a disappointing first season for Milan, with him not starting any of the final 14 league games. A perceived lack of dedication in training and a lifestyle of late night partying not befitting of an athlete saw him receive criticism, with Carlo Ancelotti, his coach at Milan in his first season in Italy, commenting, "The decline of Ronaldinho hasn't surprised me. His physical condition has always been very precarious. His talent though has never been in question."

==== 2009–10 season ====
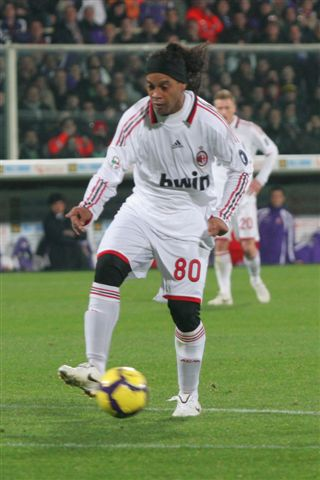
Ronaldinho against Fiorentina in February 2010

Ronaldinho's second season did not begin on a high note, but he soon rediscovered his form and was arguably Milan's best player of the season. Newly appointed coach Leonardo changed his role from a central attacking midfielder to the left side of midfield, with Alexandre Pato on the right, in an offensive 4–3–3 formation.

Having been caught enjoying night life two days prior to a Champions League match, Ronaldinho was on the bench for the Serie A fixture against Atalanta on 4 October 2009. With Milan losing 1–0, he was substituted on at half-time and went on to score the equaliser in an eventual 1–1 draw, controlling a long ball on his chest before volleying it into the goal. Two weeks later, on 18 October, he helped Milan defeat Roma 2–1, scoring once and setting up a goal. Ronaldinho was vital again as he twice set up Marco Borriello to score in the 2–0 win against Parma on 31 October, resulting in manager Leonardo dubbing him "one of the ten best players of all time."

On 10 January 2010, Ronaldinho scored two goals against Juventus in an away match, sealing a 3–0 victory for Milan. In the following match, against Siena on 17 January, Ronaldinho scored his first hat-trick for Milan when he converted a penalty kick, scored with a header from a corner and finished with a strike into the top right corner from 20 yards out. The Estado De São Paulo newspaper declared, "Ronaldinho revives his golden years". On 12 February in a Serie A fixture against Udinese, Ronaldinho assisted all three goals as Milan won 3–2. On 16 February, he played against Manchester United in the Champions League. He scored early in the game at the San Siro to give Milan the lead. Milan ended up losing the game 3–2, with a goal from Paul Scholes and two goals from Wayne Rooney. Ronaldinho ended the Serie A campaign scoring two goals against Juventus on 15 May; Luca Antonini opened the scoring and Milan went on to win 3–0 in Leonardo's last game in charge.

In 2009–10, Ronaldinho established himself as one of the top performing players in Europe again as he was Milan's joint top scorer with 15 goals in all competitions and was the Serie A top assist provider with 15. His contributions to the team were particularly important as Kaká, the team's previous focal player, left the club in summer 2009. On a less positive note, however, he missed three penalties in the domestic season to add to one botched kick the previous season.

==== 2010–11 season ====
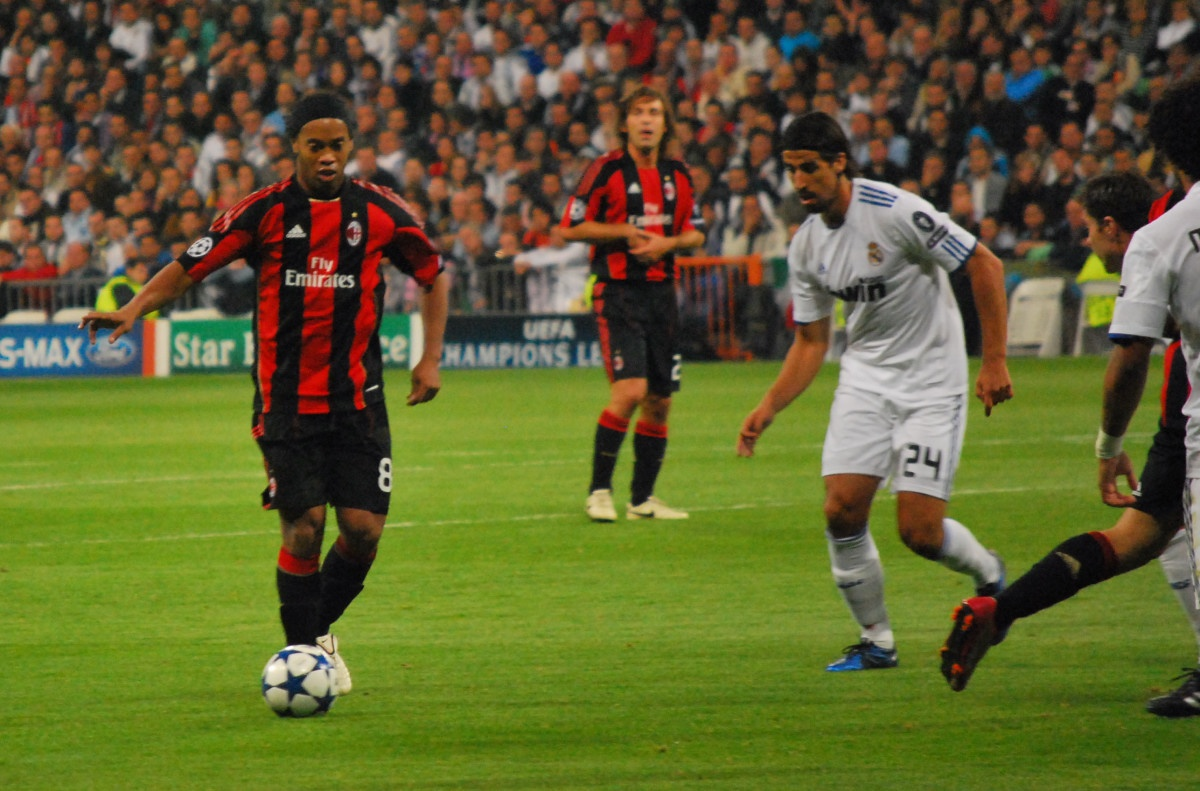
Ronaldinho on the ball against Real Madrid in the 2010–11 UEFA Champions League

Before the winter break, Ronaldinho sporadically played for Milan. He made 16 appearances, scored one goal, and made several assists. Notably, he had not featured in three consecutive matches against Bari, Palermo and Inter, when he was on the bench. The club's attacking threat mainly featured Alexandre Pato and new signings Zlatan Ibrahimović and Robinho. During this period, Milan had established themselves as favourites to win the Scudetto for the first time since 2003–04.

Despite this lack of playing time, Ronaldinho downplayed speculation about departing Milan, saying, "My future? I have no intention to leave Milan. [...] I am very happy at Milan." However, with the impending arrival of Antonio Cassano from Sampdoria in January 2011, his favour in the Milan team further decreased. Milan coach Massimiliano Allegri confirmed the eventual sale of Ronaldinho: "We await his departure becoming official". He was heavily linked with a move back to his childhood club Grêmio, with Ronaldinho himself desiring a return there. He was also of interest to LA Galaxy of Major League Soccer, Blackburn Rovers of the Premier League, and Brazilian clubs Corinthians and Palmeiras.

Ronaldinho later revealed his thoughts on his departure from Milan: "This left me very upset. I was in good shape when I was at Milan, but he [Allegri] didn't play me to give me the opportunity to express myself, so that is why I left."

=== Flamengo ===
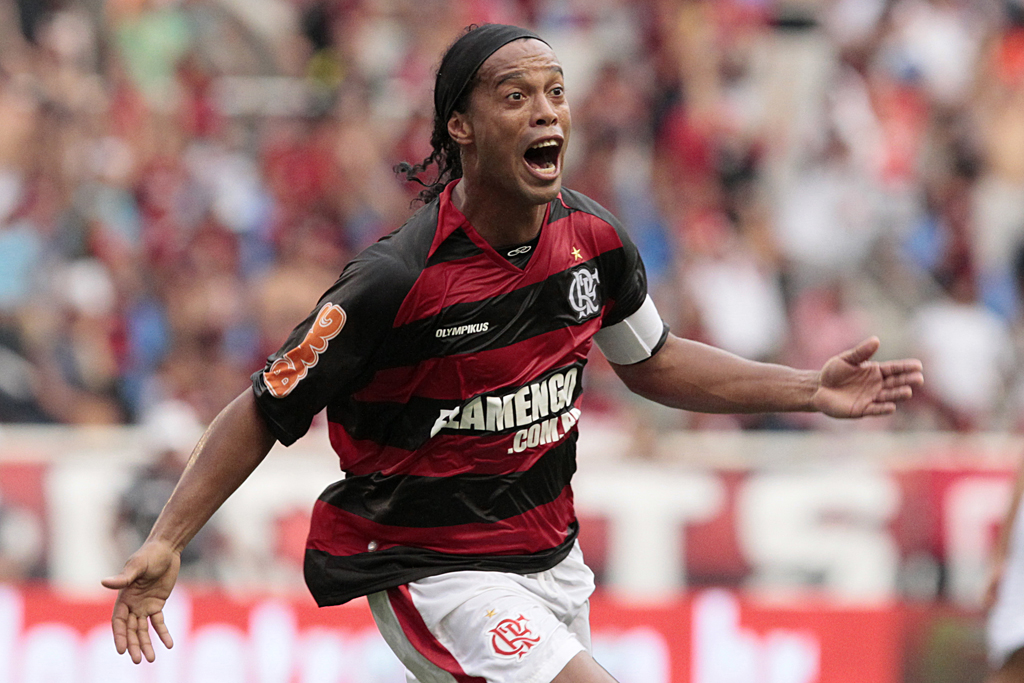
Ronaldinho celebrates scoring for Flamengo in February 2011.

Ronaldinho joined Flamengo on 11 January with a contract ending in 2014. He was greeted by more than 20,000 fans at his unveiling at his new club on 13 January.

Ronaldinho scored his first goal for Flamengo in the 3–2 victory against Boavista on 6 February 2011. On 27 February, he converted a second-half free kick for Flamengo to beat Boavista 1–0 and win his first piece of silverware with the team, the Taça Guanabara. Ronaldinho lifted his first trophy with Flamengo after curling in a right-footed shot over the wall in the 71st minute at Engenhão stadium. The goal gave Flamengo its 19th Taça Guanabara title, which earned the Campeonato Carioca title two months later, as the team also won the Taça Rio. On 27 July 2011, Ronaldinho scored a hat-trick in Flamengo's 5–4 away win against rivals Santos, after being 3–0 down inside the first 30 minutes. On 31 May 2012, after being absent for a few days, he sued Flamengo claiming lack of payment for four months and cancelled his contract with the club.

=== Atlético Mineiro ===
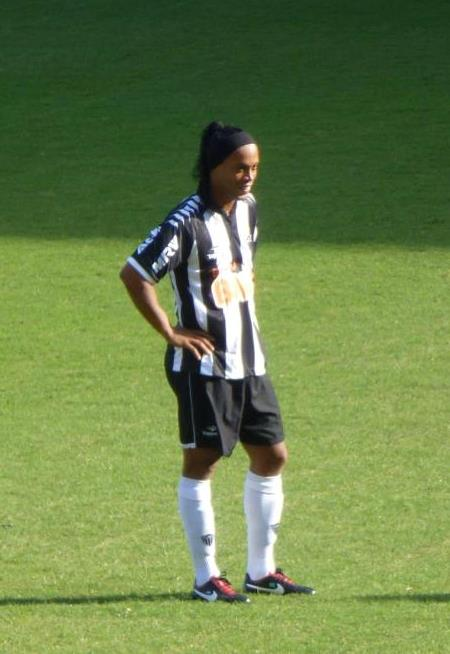
Ronaldinho with Atlético Mineiro in June 2013

Ronaldinho made a move to Atlético Mineiro on 4 June 2012 in a six-month contract, just four days after leaving Flamengo. He wore number 49 in reference to his mother's birth year since his preferred number 10 was already assigned to Guilherme in the 2012 season.

Ronaldinho made his debut for Galo on 9 June 2012, playing for 90 minutes in a 1–0 away win against Palmeiras, and scored his first goal for the club on 23 June 2012 against Náutico, from the penalty spot. Ronaldinho led Atlético Mineiro to a good 2012 season, in which the club finished second in the 2012 Brasileirão and qualified for the 2013 Copa Libertadores. Ronaldinho won the Bola de Ouro award, selected as the best player in the league.

The career of Ronaldinho poses a stark question. Should we be grateful for what he gave us or angry that it ended so soon? Delighted to have shared a pitch with him for 90 minutes, there is no doubt which way the Raja Casablanca players would cast their votes.

— Tim Vickery on Ronaldinho being six years past his prime, and being mobbed by opposition players at the 2013 FIFA Club World Cup.

The following year, Ronaldinho helped Atlético win the Campeonato Mineiro and led the club to its first Copa Libertadores title. Ronaldinho scored four goals and assisted on eight occasions during Atlético's dramatic title run, which included consecutive comebacks from 0–2 first leg defeats in both the semi-finals against Argentine club Newell's Old Boys and the finals against Club Olimpia from Paraguay. Both ties were determined in Atlético's favour after penalty shootouts. Although six years past his best, Ronaldinho's displays saw him voted the 2013 South American Footballer of the Year.

At the 2013 FIFA Club World Cup held in Morocco in December, Atlético lost 3–1 to Raja Casablanca in the semi-final, with Ronaldinho scoring from a free-kick. As the final whistle blew, the Raja Casablanca team rushed to their childhood idol and stripped him down to his underpants in search of souvenirs. He renewed his contract with Atlético in January 2014. After winning the 2014 Recopa Sudamericana, Ronaldinho left the club in July, reaching an agreement to cancel his contract by mutual consent.

=== Querétaro ===
After becoming a free agent, Ronaldinho was offered contracts from English Conference South club Basingstoke Town and newly formed Indian Super League franchise Chennai Titans through their co-owner Prashant Agarwal, but eventually signed a two-year contract with Mexican club Querétaro on 5 September 2014. Ronaldinho made his debut for Querétaro in a 1–0 loss to Tigres UANL where he missed a penalty kick. In his next match, however, against Guadalajara, he had a much better game, setting up Camilo Sanvezzo to score as well as scoring himself from a penalty kick in a 4–1 win. On 30 October 2014, he scored a free kick against Atlas during an away match at the Estadio Jalisco.

On 18 April 2015, Ronaldinho scored twice against Liga MX title-holders América in an away game at the Estadio Azteca, in which his team won 4–0. All of the spectators, mostly consisting of América supporters, gave a standing ovation to Ronaldinho after his goals had brought him to tears. This was the second time in Ronaldinho's career he had received such an ovation from opposing fans (after Madrid fans had applauded his performance in a Barcelona shirt in 2005), and after the match, Ronaldinho stated in an interview, "It is an emotion to live more. I had an ovation at the Bernabéu and now here. I never imagined this. It is something that makes me like Mexico even more and I feel right at home."

Ronaldinho scored two penalties in consecutive matches, the second giving Querétaro the classification to the Liga MX playoffs. On 17 May 2015, Querétaro progressed to the semi-finals after defeating Veracruz 4–3 aggregate. In the second match, Ronaldinho scored a free kick with the help of the opponent's goalkeeper who made contact with the ball. Querétaro eventually advanced to the final after beating Pachuca on aggregate 2–2. In the final against Santos Laguna, Querétaro lost the first leg 0–5 and then won the 2nd leg 3–0 but lost 3–5 on aggregate. In June 2015, Ronaldinho, now 35, announced his departure from the club and thanked the Mexican people and fans of Querétaro: "I want to thank all the Mexican nation for all the days that I have lived with people so special, you will be forever in my heart. Thank you very much the Nation Gallos Blancos, which made me very proud to wear this shirt and defend this club."

=== Fluminense ===
On 11 July 2015, Ronaldinho announced his return to Brazil and signed an 18-month contract with Fluminense, but on 28 September, Ronaldinho reached a mutual agreement with the club to terminate the deal. He made nine appearances during his two-month stint at the club, failing to impress and being heavily criticized by the fans. Fluminense sporting director Mario Bittencourt stated, "Ronaldinho asked us for a meeting. He respectfully told us he didn't feel he was able to perform as well as he wanted and that it was a bad situation for him. He made a great gesture in saying he wasn't being the player he felt he could be right now. I'll never speak about whether or not he is retiring. That's not something you say about a player of his calibre. He was always spectacular, as player and person."

=== Futsal in India ===
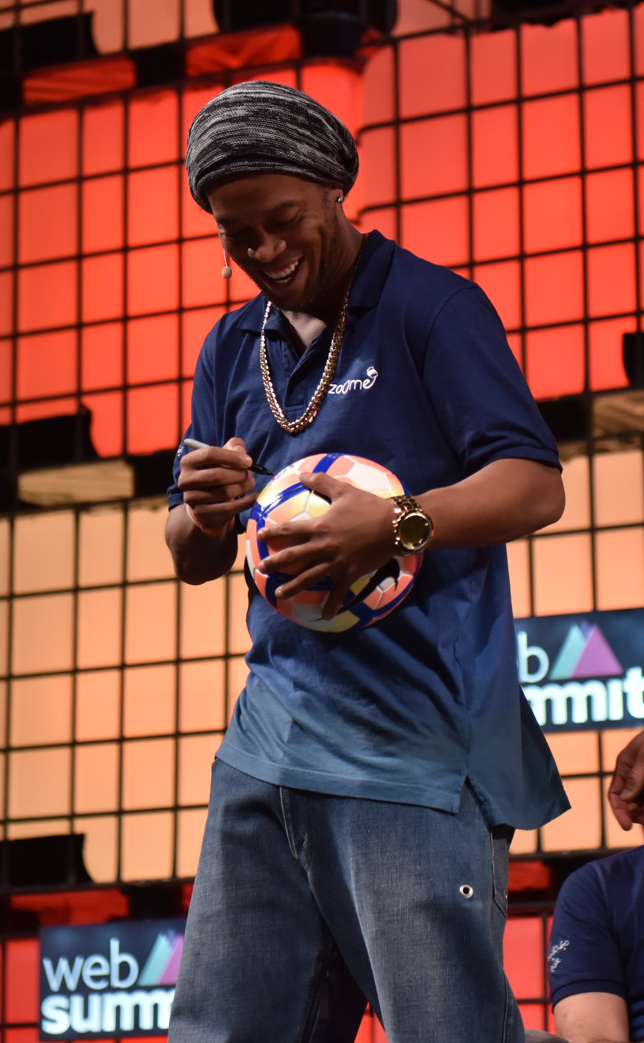
Ronaldinho signing a football at the Web Summit in November 2016

In July 2016, Ronaldinho played for the Goa 5′s, a futsal team from Goa in India, together with Ryan Giggs, Paul Scholes, Míchel Salgado, and Hernán Crespo as well as futsal player Falcão in the Premier Futsal League. After two games, he left India to be an ambassador of the 2016 Summer Paralympics in Rio de Janeiro. He was replaced by Cafu.

From September to early October 2017, Ronaldinho joined the Delhi Dragons from Delhi in the Premier Futsal League. He scored 16 goals in eight games.

=== First retirement ===
On 16 January 2018, Ronaldinho confirmed his retirement from football through his brother/agent: "He has stopped, it is ended. Let's do something pretty big and nice after the Russia World Cup, probably in August." Such a celebration was supposed to take place three years after his last appearance for Fluminense, but has not materialized. He retired as one of just eight players to have won the FIFA World Cup, the UEFA Champions League and the Ballon d'Or.

Ronaldinho appeared at the closing ceremony of the 2018 FIFA World Cup at the Luzhniki Stadium in Moscow on 15 July, performing a few bars of the Russian folk song "Kalinka" (sung by opera singer Aida Garifullina) on an African drum.

=== Beach soccer ===
In January 2019, Ronaldinho participated in a testimonial beach soccer match in Rio de Janeiro honoring his close friend and fellow Brazilian beach soccer legend Jorginho, who had retired from competitive play in 2018 after a career spanning more than two decades. Playing for Brazil against Japan, Ronaldinho scored a hat-trick, as Brazil won 11–4. The match celebrated Jorginho's contributions to beach soccer, with both players wearing the number 10 shirt.

=== Ravenna ===
In 2026, Ronaldinho came out of retirement to sign for Serie C side Ravenna. He also joined Ravenna as an investor, and was quoted as saying "Yes, it's true! Let's say it's a challenge for me, too. I will certainly play a few minutes in an official match, then we'll see how I feel." When he arrived in Italy in August 2026, his playing role remained uncertain, and club president Ignazio Cipriani confirmed that he would not play in the season opener against Reggiana.

On 15 November 2026, Ronaldinho made his debut for the club in a 2–0 Serie C win against Forlì; he was in the starting lineup and was substituted at the break with the score at 1–0.

== Club ownership ==
In 2024, Ronaldinho, along with his brother and business partner Roberto, joined the ownership group of USL League One club Greenville Triumph SC as well as their women's side USL W League club Greenville Liberty SC.

== International career ==
=== Youth teams ===
In 1997, Ronaldinho was part of the first Brazilian team to win the FIFA U-17 World Championship, which was held in Egypt, in which his first goal was a penalty against Austria in the first group match, which Brazil won 7–0. Ronaldinho finished with two goals and was awarded the Bronze Ball award as Brazil scored a total of 21 goals while only conceding 2.

1999 was a busy year for Ronaldinho in terms of international play. First he appeared in the South American Youth Championship, where he scored three goals in nine appearances and helped the U20s to reach third place. Then he took part in the that year's FIFA World Youth Championship in Nigeria, scoring his first goal in Brazil's last group match. In the round of 16, he scored two first-half goals in a 4–0 win over Croatia, and finished with three goals as Brazil were eliminated by Uruguay in the quarter-finals.

=== Early success ===
On 26 June, three days before the start of the 1999 Copa América, Ronaldinho debuted the Brazilian senior team in a 3–0 friendly victory against Latvia, while scoring one goal during Brazil's victorious Copa América campaign as well. One week after the conclusion of the Copa América, he was called up for the 1999 FIFA Confederations Cup, in which he scored in every match except the final, including a hat-trick in an 8–2 semi-final rout of Saudi Arabia. In the final, Brazil lost 4–3 against Mexico. Ronaldinho won the Golden Ball award for the best player in the tournament as well as the Golden Boot award for the tournament top-scorer.

In 2000, Ronaldinho participated in the Summer Olympics in Sydney, Australia, with the U23 national team. Earlier that year, Ronaldinho led Brazil to win the Pre-Olympic Tournament, scoring nine goals in seven matches. However, in the Olympics, Brazil were eliminated in the quarter-finals by Cameroon, who later won the gold medal. Ronaldinho appeared four times and scored only one goal, which came in the quarter-final defeat by Cameroon.

=== 2002 World Cup glory ===
On the eve of the final, Ronaldo, Rivaldo and Ronaldinho warmed up in the Yokohama Stadium by merrily trying to out-wizard each other in the Japanese drizzle.

— Amy Lawrence of The Guardian on the bond of the "three R's".

Ronaldinho participated in his first World Cup in 2002, as part of a formidable offensive unit with Ronaldo and Rivaldo, dubbed the "Three Rs", who were also on the 1999 Copa América winning squad. The World Cup was held in South Korea and Japan, and Ronaldinho appeared in five matches during the tournament and scored two goals, as well as contributing with three assists. His first goal came in the group stage match against China PR, which Brazil won 4–0.

The most memorable match in Ronaldinho's World Cup career took place in the quarter-final against England on 21 June. With Brazil trailing after Michael Owen's 23-minute strike, Ronaldinho turned the game around. Having received the ball inside his own half, Ronaldinho ran at the England defence and wrong footed star defender Ashley Cole with a trademark step over before passing the ball to Rivaldo on the edge of the penalty area to score the equalising goal just before half-time. Then, in the 50th minute, Ronaldinho took a free-kick from 40 yards out which curled into the top left corner of the net, completely surprising England's goalkeeper David Seaman, giving Brazil a 2–1 lead. Seven minutes later, he was sent off for a foul on England defender Danny Mills. Ronaldinho was suspended for the semi-final, but returned to Brazil's starting lineup for the 2–0 victory over Germany in the final as Brazil won its record fifth World Cup title.

=== 2005 Confederations Cup title ===
Ronaldinho's next international tournament was the 2003 Confederations Cup, in which he went scoreless as Brazil were eliminated in the group stage. The following year, he was dropped from Brazil's 2004 Copa América squad, as coach Carlos Alberto Parreira decided to rest his stars and used a largely reserve squad.

After falling short in 1999 and 2003, Ronaldinho was the captain of Brazil and led his team to its second ever Confederations Cup title in 2005. He converted a penalty kick in a 3–2 semi-final win against host Germany and was named Man of the Match in a 4–1 victory over archrival Argentina in the final on 29 June. Ronaldinho scored three goals in the tournament and is tied with Mexican forward Cuauhtémoc Blanco as the tournament's all-time top goalscorer with nine goals.

=== 2006 World Cup ===
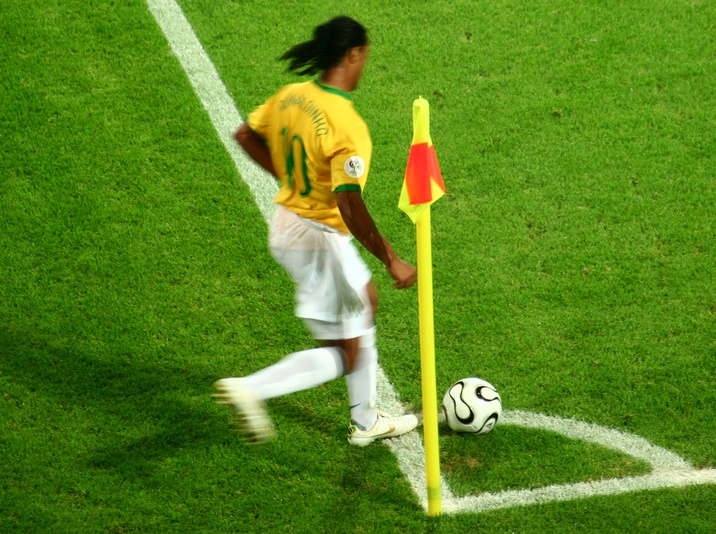
Ronaldinho taking a corner during the 2006 World Cup

For the 2006 World Cup finals, Ronaldinho was part of Brazil's much-publicized "magic quartet" of offensive players alongside Adriano, Ronaldo and Kaká, which was expected to provide the "Joga Bonito" style of play that was the focus of an extensive advertising campaign by Nike leading up to the tournament. However, deemed "top heavy and unbalanced", the team finished with ten goals in five games, with Ronaldinho himself going scoreless and finishing with only one assist (for Gilberto's goal in a 4–1 group stage victory over Japan), as he turned in his worst collective performance in his international career. Brazil endured a disappointing campaign that culminated in a 1–0 loss to France in the quarter-finals, during which the Seleção had only one shot on goal.

How would Ronaldinho react? After Pelé's disappointment in the 1966 World Cup, he fought like a lion to get himself in good shape for 1970. Ronaldinho took a different path – one that led to the nightclub rather than the training ground.

— Tim Vickery for ESPN, January 2018.

The team was harshly criticized by Brazilian fans and media following their return home. On 3 July, two days after Brazil's elimination, vandals immolated and destroyed a 23-foot (7.5-metre) tall fiberglass and resin statue of Ronaldinho in Chapecó. The statue had been erected in 2004 to celebrate his first FIFA World Player of the Year award. That same day, Ronaldinho, joined by Adriano, returned to the city of Barcelona and held a party at his home, which was continued into the early morning hours at a nightclub. This aggravated the hard feelings of many Brazilian fans, who believed that they were betrayed by the lack of effort from the squad. Displaying a passivity to Brazil's poor showing, the 2006 World Cup is now seen as the turning point in Ronaldinho's career, with his time at the summit of the game almost up. 1970 Brazil World Cup winner Tostão wrote in O Tempo: "Ronaldinho lacks an important characteristic of Maradona and Pelé—aggression. They transformed themselves in adversity. They became possessed, and furious."

=== 2008 Olympic medal ===
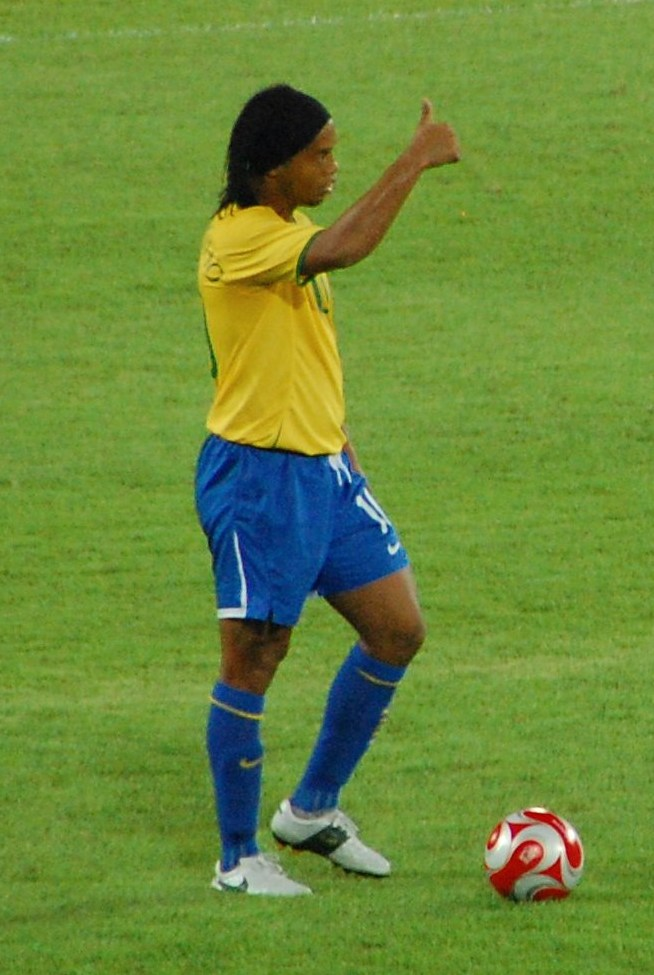
Ronaldinho at the 2008 Summer Olympics in Beijing

On 24 March 2007, Ronaldinho scored twice in a 4–0 win over Chile, which marked his first goal since the 2005 Confederations Cup final and thus ended a scoreless streak that lasted nearly two years. He was not called up for the 2007 Copa América after asking to be excused from the tournament due to fatigue. On 18 October, he was controversially benched by Barcelona after he was late returning to Spain following Brazil's 5–0 friendly win over Ecuador. He and several Brazil players celebrated the win by partying through the night at an upscale Rio de Janeiro nightclub. Ronaldinho left at 11 a.m. the next morning, allegedly in the trunk of a car in order to avoid the media.

On 7 July 2008, Ronaldinho was named in Brazil's 2008 Summer Olympics squad as one of the overage players. Barcelona initially blocked the move because of his then-upcoming Champions League commitments with the club, but the decision was later nullified following Ronaldinho's transfer to Milan, who in turn permitted him to make the trip to Beijing, China. Ronaldinho captained the team, and he scored his only two goals in a 5–0 victory over New Zealand before Brazil were beaten by Argentina in the semi-final. Brazil finished with the bronze medal after defeating Belgium 3–0 in the third-place match.

=== 2010 and 2014 World Cup absence ===
Despite having returned to good form and being named as a member of the 30-man provisional squad that was submitted to FIFA on 11 May 2010, he was not named in coach Dunga's final squad of 23 for the Brazilian squad in South Africa for the 2010 World Cup despite his deep desire to participate in the competition. Critics claimed that the exclusion of players such as Ronaldinho, Alexandre Pato, Adriano and Ronaldo signaled a move away from the classic Brazilian attacking "Joga Bonito" style of play. At the tournament, Brazil was eliminated by the Netherlands in the quarter-final.

In September 2011, Ronaldinho made his return to the national team under coach Mano Menezes in a friendly against Ghana at Fulham's Craven Cottage, playing the full 90 minutes in a 1–0 win for Brazil. He then had solid performances in back-to-back friendlies against Argentina in the same month. In October, he performed well against Mexico in a friendly, scoring a free kick to equalize after Dani Alves was sent off. Brazil went on to win the match with a goal from Marcelo.

Ronaldinho's good form continued in 2013, and in January he was unexpectedly called up by coach Luiz Felipe Scolari for a friendly against England played on 6 February at Wembley Stadium as part of The Football Association (FA)'s 150th anniversary. Ronaldinho started in what was his 100th cap (including non-official matches), and had a chance to score from the penalty kick, but his shot was saved by Joe Hart. Brazil lost the match 1–2. He was again called up for the Seleção, being named captain of the national team for an international friendly with Chile on 24 April 2013. However, Ronaldinho was not selected for the national team for the 2013 Confederations Cup and he was also omitted from Scolari's 2014 World Cup finals squad.

== Player profile ==
=== Style of play ===
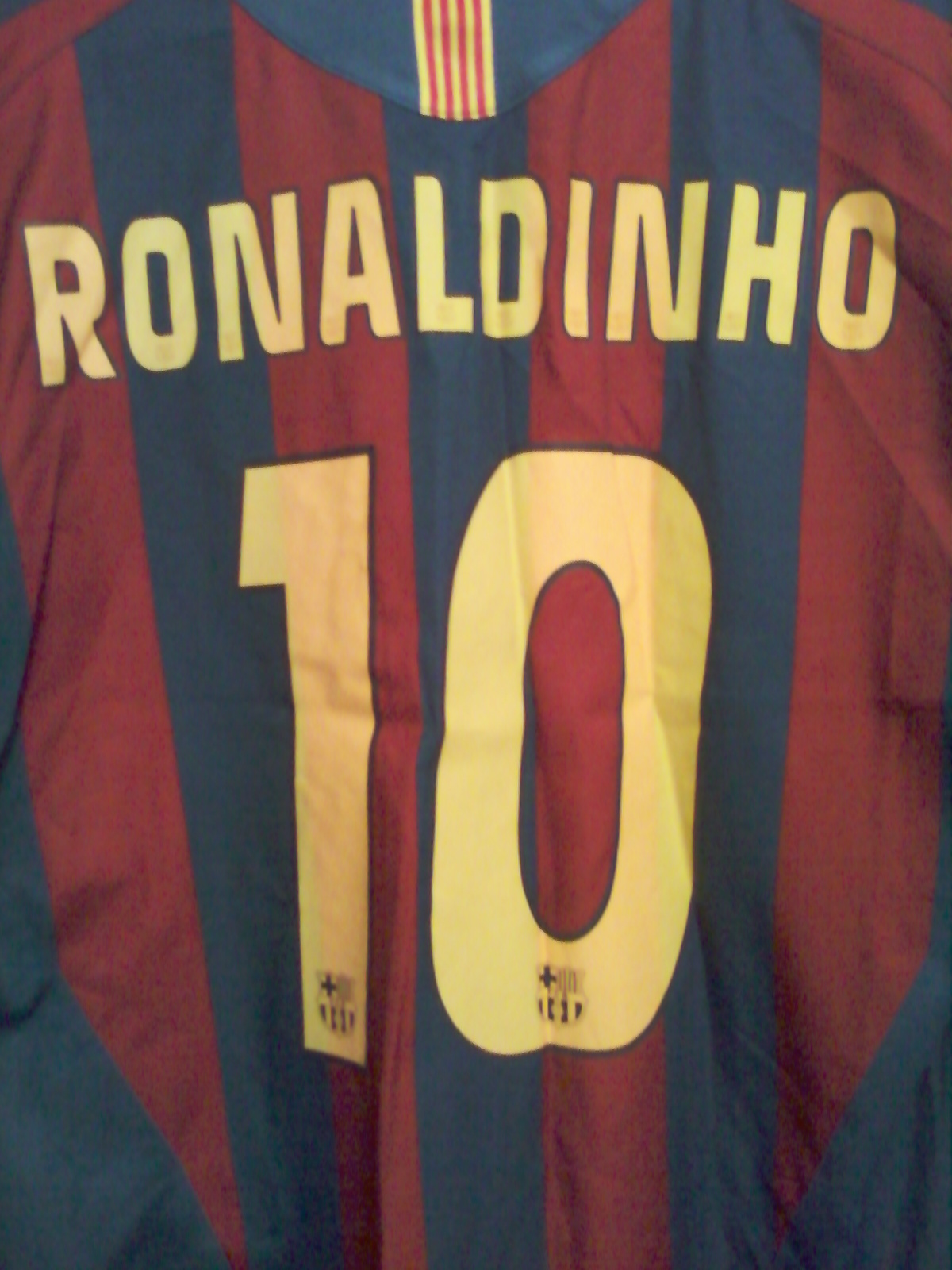
Barcelona 2005–06 season home shirt. Ronaldinho wore the number 10 for much of his club and international career.

Known by the nickname "O Bruxo" ('The Wizard'), Ronaldinho is regarded as one of the greatest and most skilful players of all time. Due to his ability to score and create goals, he was capable of playing in several attacking positions. Throughout his career, he was often deployed as a winger, although he usually played as a classic number 10 in an attacking midfielder role. While he is naturally right-footed, during his time at Barcelona, Ronaldinho was also used as an inverted winger on the left flank at times by manager Frank Rijkaard, while the left-footed Messi was deployed on the right; this position allowed him to cut inside and shoot on goal with his stronger foot. He was also capable of playing as a second striker.

Despite primarily being a creative player, who was renowned for his passing, vision, and playmaking, Ronaldinho was an accurate finisher with either foot, both from inside and outside the penalty area, as well as being a free-kick and penalty kick specialist. Although he was primarily known for his ability to bend the ball from set pieces, he was also capable of striking the ball with power underneath the wall, and also occasionally used the knuckleball technique, which was popularised by his compatriot Juninho Pernambucano. He is widely regarded as one of the most prolific free kick takers in history, and also influenced his former teammate Messi, who went on to become a free kick specialist himself.

"When you play with him and see what he does with a ball, nothing surprises me any more. One of these days, he will make the ball talk."

— Barcelona teammate Eiður Guðjohnsen on Ronaldinho, December 2006.

Throughout his career, Ronaldinho was praised by pundits in particular for his technical skills, flair, and creativity, as well as his exceptional first touch. With his pace, acceleration, athleticism, ball control, and dribbling ability, he was capable of beating players during individual runs, often using an array of tricks and feints to get past opponents in one on one situations, including step overs and nutmegs. Physically strong in possession of the ball, Richard Williams writes, "Slender in build, the Brazilian has a strength belying the cartoonish smile." He also incorporated flashy moves such as back-heels, bicycle kicks, and no-look passes into his playstyle. Among his repertoire of moves is the "elastico", a move he learned by watching videos of one of his idols, the 1970s Brazilian star Rivelino. Ronaldinho came to be known as one of the best exponents of the feint, and in parts of Africa—especially Nigeria—this move is now called 'The Gaúcho', due to him popularising the use of this particular skill.

=== Reception ===
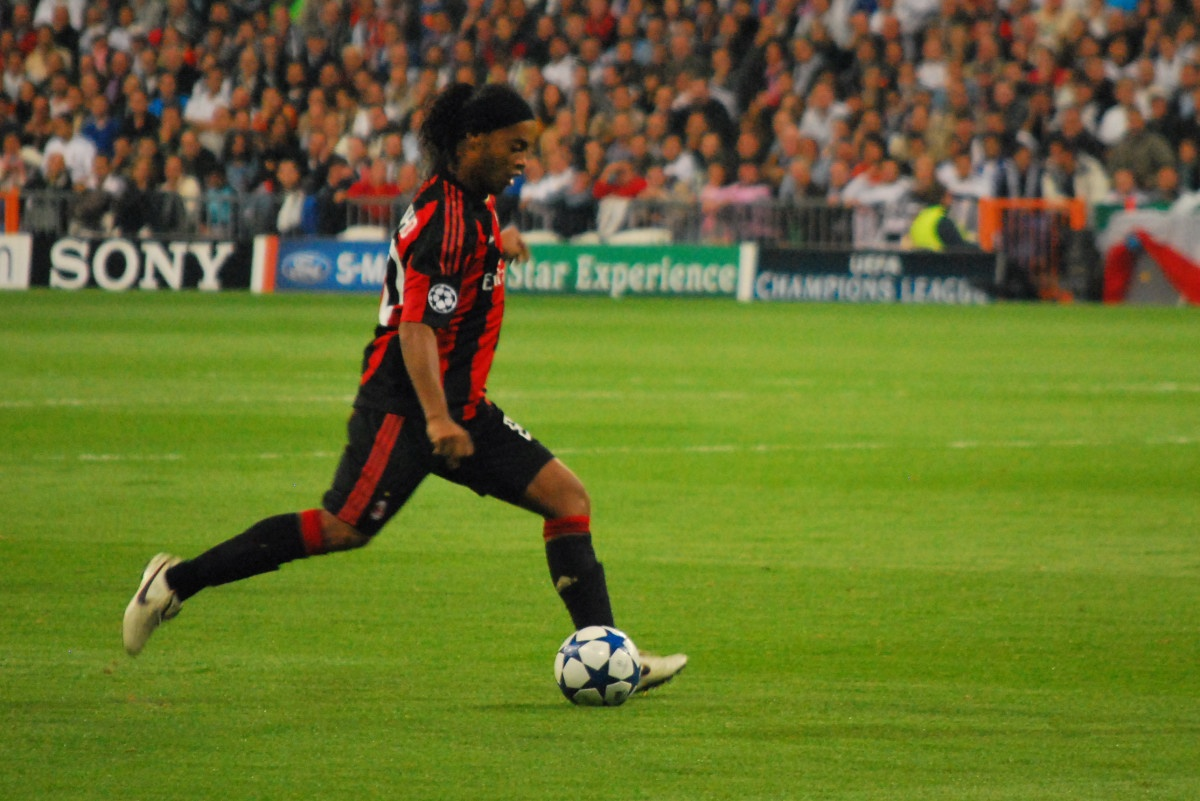
In addition to his dribbling ability and exhibiting a wide array of skills, Ronaldinho was also known for his creativity and vision.

ESPN described Ronaldinho as being "skillful by nature, his tricks are unparalleled and he is wonderful with the ball at his feet. One of the coolest players in pressure situations" and a "fast, brash, skilful, tricky, an uninhibited playmaker" who provides "a mix of goals, assists, skills and a large repertoire of crafty moves". Zlatan Ibrahimović stated, "Prime Ronaldinho was phenomenal. He made his opponents look like children." Former Portugal midfield playmaker Rui Costa has said of his vision and passing ability: "There are not many players who can offer goal-scoring passes like he can. He is just marvellous. He is a rare case of an assist man who can provide the ball from anywhere." In 2010, his former Barcelona teammate, Edgar Davids, said of him: "For the skills and tricks, Ronaldinho was the best player that I ever played with." Another one of his former Barcelona teammates, Henrik Larsson, echoed this view. His compatriot Willian rated him as the greatest player of all time in 2019, while Juninho described him as the most skilful player he had ever seen. In 2019, FourFourTwo described him as "possibly the best technician in the history of football in Brazil", placing him at number five in their list of "The 101 greatest football players of the last 25 years". In 2006, Richard Williams of The Guardian described Ronaldinho as a "genius", while his former Barcelona teammate Sylvinho said of him: "He's so smart, so intelligent, that sometimes it's difficult to read his mind", also adding: "He's amazing. He's 100% talent. And he's a powerful player as well, so it's difficult to stop him."

The Brazilian legend Tostão claimed: "Ronaldinho has the dribbling skills of Rivelino, the vision of Gérson, the spirit and happiness of Garrincha, the pace, skill and power of Jairzinho and Ronaldo, the technical ability of Zico and the creativity of Romário." Above all he had one, very special ability: he made you smile.

— Sid Lowe after Ronaldinho's retirement in January 2018.

In spite of his performances at his peak, a period of dedication and focus which saw him named the FIFA World Player of the Year twice and receive the Ballon d'Or, Ronaldinho was also criticised on occasion in the media for his lack of discipline in training, as well as his hedonistic lifestyle off the pitch, which impacted the overall longevity of his career. Referring to Ronaldinho as "Brazil's childlike genius who never grew up", Tim Vickery writes that it was the sudden death of his father at such a young age that may have seen Ronaldinho shy away from remaining at the top, with the attitude of "life is short and can end unexpectedly—so enjoy it while you can".

== Outside football ==
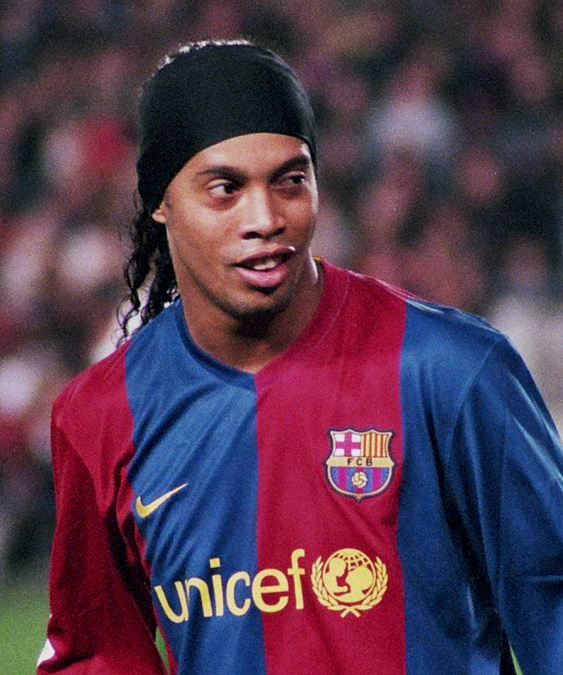
Ronaldinho (pictured with Barcelona in 2007) has been a UNICEF ambassador since February 2006.

Ronaldinho has had endorsements with many companies, including Nike, Pepsi, Coca-Cola, EA Sports and Danone. One of the world's highest paid players, in 2006 he earned over $19 million from endorsements. Having endorsed Pepsi for much of his career and appeared in commercials with David Beckham, Thierry Henry and Lionel Messi, Ronaldinho signed a deal with Coca-Cola in 2011, however this was terminated in July 2012 after he was caught drinking Pepsi in a news conference.

Ronaldinho has featured in EA Sports' FIFA video game series, appearing on the cover of FIFA Football 2004, FIFA Street, FIFA 06, FIFA 07, FIFA Street 3, FIFA 08 and FIFA 09. At the beginning of his career Ronaldinho signed a lucrative 10-year deal with sportswear company Nike (wearing Nike Tiempo R10 boots designed for him). He has appeared in Nike commercials, including the 2002 "Secret Tournament" commercial (branded "Scorpion KO") directed by Terry Gilliam. His 2005 Nike advertisement, where he is given a new pair of boots and then proceeds to juggle a football and appears to repeatedly volley it against the crossbar of a goal and recover it without the ball touching the ground, went viral on YouTube, becoming the site's first video to reach one million views. A 2010 Nike commercial, Write the Future directed by Alejandro González Iñárritu, features Ronaldinho executing a number of stepovers, which became a viral video re-enacted and shared millions of times.

A wax sculpture of Ronaldinho was unveiled at Madame Tussauds Hong Kong in December 2007. Ronaldinho has had an official role with UNICEF, the United Nations Children's Fund, since February 2006. In 2011, he was recruited by the Joint United Nations Programme on HIV/AIDS to promote awareness among young people of the disease and how to avoid it. In March 2015, Ronaldinho was the sixth most popular sportsperson on Facebook, behind Cristiano Ronaldo, Messi, Beckham, Neymar and Kaká, with 31 million Facebook fans. Ronaldinho also has over 50 million Instagram followers.

On 2 February 2017, Barcelona announced that Ronaldinho signed a 10-year deal to become an ambassador for the club at institutional events. On 6 July 2018, Ronaldinho announced a partnership with company World Soccer Coin (WSC) to develop a new cryptocurrency, the Ronaldinho Soccer Coin, with WSC claiming that the profits of the coin will be used to football projects such as "Ronaldinho Digital Stadiums".

In late July 2021, he went to Beirut, Lebanon, to lay a wreath in honor of victims of the port explosion.

In fiction, Ronaldinho features as a character in Rupert Thomson's 2021 novel Barcelona Dreaming.

In 2018, he appeared in the American martial arts film Kickboxer: Retaliation, alongside Alain Moussi and Jean-Claude Van Damme.

Ronaldinho would appear in a match for the Kings League, a seven-a-side competition with unique rules, in 2023, playing for Ibai Llanos's Porcinos FC. After being promised his own team in a then-upcoming Brazilian version of the Kings League by co-founder Gerard Piqué, it was announced in 2024 that he had instead signed to the six-a-side Baller League to have a team in their new competition in the United States, later revealed to be the Midnight Wizards.

=== Ronaldinho Gaúcho (comic strip) ===
Ronaldinho Gaúcho is a Brazilian celebrity comic strip by Mauricio de Sousa, syndicated by Atlantic Syndication. It features a fictionalised version of Ronaldinho as a child. The strip was created in 2006, when the 2006 FIFA World Cup was taking place in Germany. It ran until 2015.

It was adapted into an animated television series as Ronaldinho Gaucho's Team, produced by Italian studio GIG Italy Entertainment, with the coproduction of MSP (Mauricio de Sousa Produções).

In 2014, because of the FIFA World Cup held in Brazil, Ronaldinho Gaúcho's short animated series was acquired by the paid children's channel Gloob. At the same time, the Discovery Kids channel aired the series "Pelezinho in: Planet Soccer". The series "Pelezinho in: Planet Soccer" was also launched, usually passing during Discovery Kids commercials, and Neymar Jr. by Nickelodeon.

=== Legal troubles ===
In July 2019, 57 properties belonging to Ronaldinho along with his Brazilian and Spanish passports were confiscated because of unpaid taxes and fines. The judge ultimately decided to reduce the fine from R$8.5 million to R$6 million for building a fishing platform on Guaíba River in a 'heritage-protected' area. Ronaldinho and his brother would ultimately fail to pay the fines within the allotted time and have their passports suspended.

In March 2020, he was questioned by police in Paraguay after he was alleged to have used a fake passport to enter the country while going for a charity event and book promotion, with Ronaldinho and his brother both being held in custody in the country. A lawyer representing Ronaldinho and his brother could not explain why they used fake passports to enter the country, as Brazilian nationals do not require a passport to countries that are members of the Mercosur trade bloc. While in prison he competed in a prison futsal tournament, where his team was victorious. They won 11–2 in the finals, with Ronaldinho scoring five goals and assisting the other six. He attempted to appeal the detention order but was ordered to remain under house arrest with his brother. On 24 August 2020, Ronaldinho and his brother were released from Paraguayan prison after their judge agreed to a plea deal with fines of US$90,000 and US$110,000 for the brothers, respectively.

== Personal life ==
Ronaldinho is the father of a son, João, born on 25 February 2005, to Brazilian dancer Janaína Mendes and named after his late father.

He gained Spanish citizenship in 2007.

In March 2018, Ronaldinho joined the Brazilian Republican Party, which has links to the Universal Church of the Kingdom of God. Ronaldinho endorsed presidential candidate Jair Bolsonaro in the 2018 Brazilian presidential election.

== Career statistics ==
Ronaldinho made 854 appearances and scored 328 goals for club and country combined, with a goalscoring average of 0.38.

=== Club ===
As of match played 15 November 2026

Appearances and goals by club, season and competition
Club	Season	League			State league (Note: Includes Campeonato Gaúcho, Campeonato Carioca, Campeonato Mineiro)		National cup (Note: Includes Copa do Brasil, Coupe de France, Copa del Rey, Coppa Italia, Copa MX)		League cup (Note: Includes Coupe de la Ligue)		Continental		Other		Total	
Club	Season	Division	Apps	Goals	Apps	Goals	Apps	Goals	Apps	Goals	Apps	Goals	Apps	Goals	Apps	Goals
Grêmio	1998	Série A	14	1	7	2	2	0	—		15 (Note: Ten appearances and one goal in Copa Libertadores, five appearances and two goals in Copa Mercosur)	3	—		38	6
Grêmio	1999	Série A	17	4	17	15	3	0	—		4 (Note: Appearances in Copa Mercosur)	2	6 (Note: Four appearances in Copa Sul, two appearances and one goal in Seletiva Libertadores)	1	47	22
Grêmio	2000	Série A	21	14	13	11	3	3	—		—		—		37	28
Grêmio	2001	Série A	—		—		—		—		—		3 (Note: Appearances in Copa Sul-Minas)	2	3	2
Grêmio	Total		52	19	37	28	8	3	—		19	5	9	3	125	58
Paris Saint-Germain	2001–02	Ligue 1	28	9	—		2	0	4	2	6 (Note: Appearances in UEFA Cup)	2	—		40	13
Paris Saint-Germain	2002–03	Ligue 1	27	8	—		5	3	1	0	4	1	—		37	12
Paris Saint-Germain	Total		55	17	—		7	3	5	2	10	3	—		77	25
Barcelona	2003–04	La Liga	32	15	—		6	3	—		7	4	—		45	22
Barcelona	2004–05	La Liga	35	9	—		—		—		7 (Note: Appearances in UEFA Champions League)	4	—		42	13
Barcelona	2005–06	La Liga	29	17	—		2	1	—		12	7	2 (Note: Appearances in Supercopa de España)	1	45	26
Barcelona	2006–07	La Liga	32	21	—		4	0	—		8	2	5 (Note: Two appearances in Supercopa de España, one appearance in UEFA Super Cup, two appearances and one goal in FIFA Club World Cup)	1	49	24
Barcelona	2007–08	La Liga	17	8	—		1	0	—		8	1	—		26	9
Barcelona	Total		145	70	—		13	4	—		42	18	7	2	207	94
AC Milan	2008–09	Serie A	29	8	—		1	0	—		6	2	—		36	10
AC Milan	2009–10	Serie A	36	12	—		0	0	—		7	3	—		43	15
AC Milan	2010–11	Serie A	11	0	—		0	0	—		5	1	—		16	1
AC Milan	Total		76	20	—		1	0	—		18	6	—		95	26
Flamengo	2011	Série A	31	14	13	4	5	1	—		3 (Note: Appearances in Copa Sudamericana)	2	—		52	21
Flamengo	2012	Série A	2	1	10	4	—		—		8 (Note: Appearances in Copa Libertadores)	2	—		20	7
Flamengo	Total		33	15	23	8	5	1	—		11	4	—		72	28
Atlético Mineiro	2012	Série A	32	9	—		—		—		—		—		32	9
Atlético Mineiro	2013	Série A	14	7	6	4	2	0	—		14	4	2 (Note: Appearances in FIFA Club World Cup)	2	38	17
Atlético Mineiro	2014	Série A	2	0	4	0	—		—		7	1	2 (Note: Appearances in Recopa Sudamericana)	0	15	1
Atlético Mineiro	Total		48	16	10	4	2	0	—		21	5	4	2	85	27
Querétaro	2014–15	Liga MX	25	8	—		4	0	—		—		—		29	8
Fluminense	2015	Série A	7	0	—		2	0	—		—		—		9	0
Ravenna	2026–27	Serie C	1	0	—		—		—		—		—		1	0
Career total			442	165	70	40	42	11	5	2	121	41	20	7	700	266

=== International ===
Appearances and goals by national team, year and competition
National team	Year	Competitive		Friendly		Total	
National team	Year	Apps	Goals	Apps	Goals	Apps	Goals
Brazil U17	1997	13 (Note: Seven appearances and one goal in 1997 South American U-17 Championship, six appearances and two goals in 1997 FIFA U-17 World Championship)	3	0	0	13	3
Brazil U20	1998	0	0	3	2	3	2
Brazil U20	1999	14 (Note: Nine appearances and three goals in 1999 South American U-20 Championship, five appearances and three goals in 1999 FIFA World Youth Championship)	6	0	0	14	6
Brazil U20	Total	14	6	3	2	17	8
Brazil U23	1999	0	0	4	1	4	1
Brazil U23	2000	11 (Note: Seven appearances and nine goals in 2000 CONMEBOL Pre-Olympic Tournament, four appearances and one goal in 2000 Summer Olympics)	10	4	4	15	14
Brazil U23	2008	6 (Note: Appearances in 2008 Summer Olympics)	2	2	1	8	3
Brazil U23	Total	17	12	10	6	27	18
Brazil	1999	9 (Note: Four appearances and one goal in 1999 Copa América, five appearances and six goals in 1999 FIFA Confederations Cup)	7	4	0	13	7
Brazil	2000	4 (Note: Appearances in 2002 FIFA World Cup qualification)	0	1	1	5	1
Brazil	2001	2	0	2	1	4	1
Brazil	2002	5 (Note: Appearances in 2002 FIFA World Cup)	2	5	2	10	4
Brazil	2003	4 (Note: Three appearances in 2003 FIFA Confederations Cup, one appearance and one goal in 2006 FIFA World Cup qualification)	1	4	1	8	2
Brazil	2004	5 (Note: Appearances in 2006 FIFA World Cup qualification)	1	5	5	10	6
Brazil	2005	10 (Note: Five appearances and two goals in 2006 FIFA World Cup qualification, five appearances and three goals in 2005 FIFA Confederations Cup)	5	2	1	12	6
Brazil	2006	5 (Note: Appearances in 2006 FIFA World Cup)	0	4	0	9	0
Brazil	2007	4 (Note: Appearances in 2010 FIFA World Cup qualification)	1	7	4	11	5
Brazil	2008	2	0	0	0	2	0
Brazil	2009	2	0	1	0	3	0
Brazil	2010	0	0	1	0	1	0
Brazil	2011	0	0	5	1	5	1
Brazil	2012	0	0	1	0	1	0
Brazil	2013	0	0	3	0	3	0
Brazil	Total	52	17	45	16	97	33
Career total		96	38	58	24	154	62

Notes

Scores and results list Brazil's goal tally first.

International goals by number, cap, date, venue, opponent, score, result and competition
No.	Cap	Date	Venue	Opponent	Score	Result	Competition	Ref.
1	2	30 June 1999	Estádio 3 de Febrero, Ciudad del Este, Paraguay	Venezuela	5–0	5–0	1999 Copa América	
2	6	24 July 1999	Estadio Jalisco, Guadalajara, Mexico	Germany	2–0	4–0	1999 FIFA Confederations Cup	
3	7	28 July 1999	Estadio Jalisco, Guadalajara, Mexico	United States	1–0	1–0	1999 FIFA Confederations Cup	
4	8	30 July 1999	Estadio Jalisco, Guadalajara, Mexico	New Zealand	2–0	2–0	1999 FIFA Confederations Cup	
5	9	1 August 1999	Estadio Jalisco, Guadalajara, Mexico	Saudi Arabia	2–0	8–2	1999 FIFA Confederations Cup	
6	9	1 August 1999	Estadio Jalisco, Guadalajara, Mexico	Saudi Arabia	6–2	8–2	1999 FIFA Confederations Cup	
7	9	1 August 1999	Estadio Jalisco, Guadalajara, Mexico	Saudi Arabia	8–2	8–2	1999 FIFA Confederations Cup	
8	14	23 February 2000	Rajamangala Stadium, Bangkok, Thailand	Thailand	3–0	7–0	2000 King's Cup	
9	19	3 March 2001	Rose Bowl Stadium, Pasadena, United States	United States	1–0	2–1	Friendly	
10	24	17 April 2002	Estádio da Luz, Lisbon, Portugal	Portugal	1–1	1–1	Friendly	
11	27	8 June 2002	Jeju World Cup Stadium, Seogwipo, South Korea	China	3–0	4–0	2002 FIFA World Cup	
12	29	21 June 2002	Shizuoka Stadium, Shizuoka, Japan	England	2–1	2–1	2002 FIFA World Cup	
13	32	20 November 2002	Seoul World Cup Stadium, Seoul, South Korea	South Korea	3–2	3–2	Friendly	
14	34	29 March 2003	Estádio das Antas, Porto, Portugal	Portugal	1–1	1–2	Friendly	
15	40	10 September 2003	Vivaldão, Manaus, Brazil	Ecuador	1-0	1–0	2006 FIFA World Cup qualification	
16	43	28 April 2004	Ferenc Puskás Stadium, Budapest, Hungary	Hungary	4–1	4–1	Friendly	
17	45	18 August 2004	Stade Sylvio Cator, Port-au-Prince, Haiti	Haiti	2–0	6–0	Friendly	
18	45	18 August 2004	Stade Sylvio Cator, Port-au-Prince, Haiti	Haiti	4–0	6–0	Friendly	
19	45	18 August 2004	Stade Sylvio Cator, Port-au-Prince, Haiti	Haiti	5–0	6–0	Friendly	
20	46	5 September 2004	Estádio do Morumbi, São Paulo, Brazil	Bolivia	2–0	3–1	2006 FIFA World Cup qualification	
21	47	8 September 2004	Olympiastadion, Berlin, Germany	Germany	1–1	1–1	Friendly	
22	51	9 February 2005	Hong Kong Stadium, So Kon Po, Hong Kong	Hong Kong	4–0	7–1	2005 Lunar New Year Cup	
23	54	5 June 2005	Estádio Beira-Rio, Porto Alegre, Brazil	Paraguay	1–0	4–1	2006 FIFA World Cup qualification	
24	54	5 June 2005	Estádio Beira-Rio, Porto Alegre, Brazil	Paraguay	2–0	4–1	2006 FIFA World Cup qualification	
25	58	22 June 2005	RheinEnergieStadion, Cologne, Germany	Japan	2–1	2–2	2005 FIFA Confederations Cup	
26	59	25 June 2005	Frankenstadion, Nuremberg, Germany	Germany	2–1	3–2	2005 FIFA Confederations Cup	
27	60	29 June 2005	Waldstadion, Frankfurt, Germany	Argentina	3–0	4–1	2005 FIFA Confederations Cup	
28	72	24 March 2007	Ullevi, Gothenburg, Sweden	Chile	1–0	4–0	Friendly	
29	72	24 March 2007	Ullevi, Gothenburg, Sweden	Chile	3–0	4–0	Friendly	
30	76	22 August 2007	Stade de la Mosson, Montpellier, France	Algeria	2–0	2–0	Friendly	
31	77	9 September 2007	Soldier Field, Chicago, United States	United States	3–2	4–2	Friendly	
32	80	17 October 2007	Estádio do Maracanã, Rio de Janeiro, Brazil	Ecuador	2–0	5–0	2010 FIFA World Cup qualification	
33	93	11 October 2011	Estadio Corona, Torreón, Mexico	Mexico	1–1	2–1	Friendly	

== Honours ==
Grêmio

- Copa Sul: 1999
- Campeonato Gaúcho: 1999

Paris Saint-Germain

- UEFA Intertoto Cup: 2001
- Coupe de France runner-up: 2002–03

Barcelona

- La Liga: 2004–05, 2005–06
- Supercopa de España: 2005, 2006
- UEFA Champions League: 2005–06
- FIFA Club World Cup runner-up: 2006

AC Milan

- Serie A: 2010–11

Flamengo

- Campeonato Carioca: 2011

Atlético Mineiro

- Campeonato Mineiro: 2013
- Copa Libertadores: 2013
- Recopa Sudamericana: 2014

Brazil U17

- South American U-17 Championship: 1997
- FIFA U-17 World Championship: 1997

Brazil U23

- CONMEBOL Pre-Olympic Tournament: 2000
- Olympic Bronze Medal: 2008

Brazil

- FIFA World Cup: 2002
- Copa América: 1999
- FIFA Confederations Cup: 2005; runner-up: 1999

Individual

- Campeonato Gaucho top scorer: 1999
- FIFA Confederations Cup Golden Ball: 1999
- FIFA Confederations Cup Golden Shoe: 1999
- South American Team of the Year: 1999
- CONMEBOL Pre-Olympic Tournament top scorer: 2000
- Bola de Prata: 2000, 2011, 2012
- FIFA World Cup All-Star Team: 2002
- Ligue 1 Goal of The Year: 2003
- FIFA 100: 2004
- Don Balón Award: 2003–04, 2005–06
- Trofeo EFE: 2003–04
- FIFA World Player of the Year: 2004, 2005
- UEFA Team of the Year: 2004, 2005, 2006
- World Soccer Magazine World Player of The Year: 2004, 2005
- RSSSF Player of the Year: 2004, 2005
- UEFA Club Forward of the Year: 2004–05
- FIFA Confederations Cup Bronze Ball: 2005
- Ballon d'Or: 2005
- Onze d'Or: 2005
- FIFPRO Player of the Season: 2005, 2006
- FIFPRO World XI: 2005, 2006, 2007
- UEFA Club Footballer of the Year: 2005–06
- La Liga top assist provider: 2005–06
- UEFA Champions League top assist provider: 2005–06
- FIFA Club World Cup Bronze Ball: 2006
- FIFA World Player of the Year Bronze award: 2006
- Golden Foot: 2009
- Sports Illustrated Team of the Decade: 2009
- World Player of the Decade 2000s: 2009
- Serie A top assist provider: 2009–10
- The Guardian Serie A Team of the Season: 2009–10
- Campeonato Brasileiro Série A Team of the Year: 2011, 2012
- Campeonato Brasileiro Série A Best Fan's Player: 2012
- Campeonato Brasileiro Série A top assist provider: 2012
- Bola de Ouro: 2012
- Copa Libertadores top assist provider: 2012, 2013
- FIFA Club World Cup top scorer: 2013
- South American Footballer of the Year: 2013
- UEFA Ultimate Team of the Year (substitute; published in 2015)
- Brazilian Football Museum Hall of Fame
- AC Milan Hall of Fame
- Ballon d'Or Dream Team (Silver): 2020
- Globe Soccer Awards Player Career Award: 2021

Other In 2012, two Brazilian entomologists named a new species of bee, from Brazil, Eulaema quadragintanovem, stating that "the specific epithet honors the Brazilian soccer player Ronaldo de Assis Moreira, famous worldwide as 'Ronaldinho' and in Brazil as 'Ronaldinho Gaúcho'. Quadraginta novem means 'forty-nine' in Latin, the number of Ronaldinho's jersey at Atlético Mineiro, his former team in Brazil. Ronaldinho chose the number 49 as an homage to his mother, born in 1949."

== Notes ==
1. Brazilian Portuguese: [ʁonawˈdʒĩɲu ɡaˈuʃu]; "Ronaldinho", the lengthened term of endearment for "Ronaldo", is accompanied in Brazilian usage by the nickname "Gaúcho" (the demonym for people of Rio Grande do Sul). This was done in order to distinguish him from fellow footballer and countryman Ronaldo or Ronaldo Nazário, who was also known as "Ronaldinho" in Brazil beforehand. Ronaldo Nazário went by his first name upon his move to Europe, thereby allowing Ronaldinho to drop the "Gaúcho" nickname abroad.
