= Assisi Nagar =

Neighbourhood of Chennai, India

Coordinates: 13.1649211°N 80.2339751°E

Assisi Nagar is a neighbourhood near Chennai, India. It is in Tiruvallur, and near Madhavaram. It is surrounded by a green area and has 10 streets with about 500 families.

== History ==
The name Assisi came from Late Rev Father Assisi. Assisi Nagar was a place for sri lankan refuges, later it was changed to residential area. Assisi Nagar is surrounded by many greeneries, which gives nourishment to the nature.

== Hospitals ==
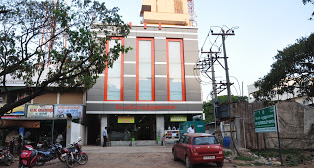
This a 24/7 hospital located at Arul Nagar, Madhavaram, Chennai

- Government Hospital, Palpannai
- KM Hospital

== Landmarks ==
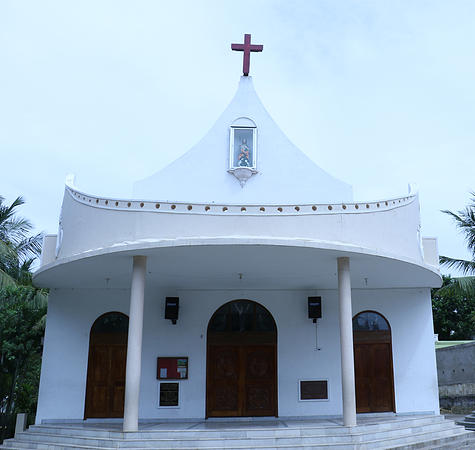
The church started in the near 6o's

- St. Judes Church, Assisi Nagar
- Park, Assisi Nagar
- Milk Colony Playground
- Botanical Garden

== Education ==
=== Schools ===
- St. Joseph matriculation Higher Secondary School
- Vidya Mandir matriculation School
- Don Bosco matriculation higher secondary school
- Viuksha Vidhyashram School

=== Colleges ===
- Jayagovind Harigopal Agarwal Agarsen College
- Sebastian ITI
- Thiruthangal nadar college
- Nallalaghu polytechnic college
- Tamil Nadu Veterinary University
