= Guarujá, Rio Grande do Sul =

Neighborhood in Porto Alegre, Brazil

Coordinates: 30.1569°S 51.2193°W

Guarujá is a neighbourhood (bairro) in the city of Porto Alegre, the state capital of Rio Grande do Sul, Brazil. It was created by Law 2022 from December 7, 1959.
