= Assis (footballer, born 1943) =

Brazilian footballer (1943–2020)

Personal information
- Full name: Francisco de Assis Luz Silva
- Date of birth: 4 October 1943
- Place of birth: Ananindeua, Brazil
- Date of death: 9 September 2020 (aged 76)
- Position: Defender

Senior career*
| Years | Team | Apps | (Gls) |
| 1960–1967 | Remo | | |
| 1968–1975 | Fluminense | | |
| 1976–1977 | Sport Recife | | |
| 1978 | Ceara | | |
- ASA de Arapiraca
- * Club domestic league appearances and goals

Francisco de Assis Luz Silva (4 October 1943 – 9 September 2020) was a Brazilian professional footballer who played as a defender.

== Career ==
Born in Ananindeua, Assis played for Remo, Fluminense (where he made 424 appearances, winning four state and one national title), Sport Recife, Ceara (where he won a further state title), and ASA de Arapiraca.
