= Diego Assis (footballer, born 1994) =

Brazilian footballer (born 1994)

Personal information
- Full name: Diego Duran de Assis Moreira
- Date of birth: 31 August 1994 (age 32)
- Place of birth: Porto Alegre, Brazil
- Height: 1.72 m (5 ft 8 in)
- Position: Midfielder

Youth career
- 2000–2006: Grêmio
- 2006–2010: Internacional
- 2011: Porto Alegre
- 2012: Flamengo
- 2012–2013: Atlético Mineiro

Senior career*
Years	Team	Apps	(Gls)
2014	Cruzeiro-RS	1	(0)
Total		1	(0)
- * Club domestic league appearances and goals

Diego Duran de Assis Moreira (born 31 August 1994), known as Diego Assis or simply Diego, is a Brazilian former footballer.

== Early life ==
Diego was born in Porto Alegre to former footballer Assis, the brother of Brazilian international Ronaldinho.

== Club career ==
=== Early career ===
At the age of five, Diego joined professional club Grêmio, the same team his father and uncle had started at. He decided to stay on at the club after his uncle, Ronaldinho, had unceremoniously left in 2001 for French side Paris Saint-Germain, but the transfer eventually impacted Diego, with fans picking him out for abuse in games and on the street.

Midway through the 2006 season, he left Grêmio for rivals Internacional, with his father citing his unhappiness at Grêmio as the reason for his departure. Grêmio's coaches claimed that Diego was playing in the reserve team as he was overweight.

In 2012, following a short spell with Porto Alegre, the club his father owns, he joined the academy of Flamengo, where Ronaldinho was playing at the time. Despite signing a three-year contract, he was linked with a move away from the club in June 2012, as he was not registered to play for Flamengo due to his poor level of fitness, and had ceased training with the club's youth team. He left Flamengo for Atlético Mineiro midway through the 2012 season, following his uncle in making the move.

=== Cruzeiro-RS ===
Following a serious back injury in early 2013, Diego was side-lined for the entire year, and ahead of the 2014 season, he joined Cruzeiro-RS. Due to inactivity for the entirety of the 2013 season, Diego was overweight when he joined Cruzeiro-RS. He made his professional debut, and only appearance in professional football, in a 2–2 Campeonato Gaúcho draw against São Luiz, coming on as a substitute for Julio Abu.

== Personal life ==
Diego has a son, Enzo, who was born in 2016.

== Career statistics ==
=== Club ===
Appearances and goals by club, season and competition
Club	Season	League			State League		Cup		Other		Total	
Club	Season	Division	Apps	Goals	Apps	Goals	Apps	Goals	Apps	Goals	Apps	Goals
Cruzeiro-RS	2014	–			1 (Note: Appearances in the Campeonato Gaúcho)	0	0	0	0	0	1	0
Career total			0	0	1	0	0	0	0	0	1	0
