= Assis (footballer, born 1971) =

Brazilian footballer and agent of Ronaldinho

Personal information
- Full name: Roberto de Assis Moreira
- Date of birth: 10 January 1971 (age 55)
- Place of birth: Porto Alegre, Brazil
- Height: 1.71 m (5 ft 7 in)
- Position: Attacking midfielder

Senior career*
Years	Team	Apps	(Gls)
1988–1992	Grêmio	50	(9)
1992–1995	Sion	97	(29)
1995–1996	Sporting CP	5	(0)
1996	Vasco	30	(10)
1996	Fluminense	6	(0)
1996–1997	Sion	8	(0)
1998	Sporting CP	8	(2)
1998	Estrela da Amadora	12	(4)
1999	Consadole Sapporo	28	(9)
2000	UAG	13	(2)
2000	Corinthians	1	(0)
2001–2002	Montpellier	9	(0)

International career
1987	Brazil U17	3	(0)
1989	Brazil U20	6	(1)
- * Club domestic league appearances and goals

Roberto de Assis Moreira (born 10 January 1971), commonly known as Assis, is a Brazilian former footballer who played as a midfielder, and who is also the brother, manager, agent and adviser of footballer Ronaldinho. He is also the owner of Porto Alegre Futebol Clube.

== Biography ==
Roberto de Assis Moreira was born 10 January 1971, in Porto Alegre, Brazil. Assis was born to Miguelina de Assis, a cosmetics saleswoman who later became a nurse, and João Moreira a ship welder and former professional player for Cruzeiro-RS. While growing up his family lived in poverty, residing in a wooden house within a favela of Porto Alegre.

Assis grew up around soccer, with his father not only being a former player, but also working as a game day doorman for Gremio while his uncles played as well. Assis was an inspiration for his brother Ronaldinho, nine years his younger, as his talents landed him a position with Gremio's youth team and led to a notable athletic career.

Assis brought his family out of the favela with his first contract, having Gremio pay for a new house in a wealthy neighborhood with a swimming pool. His father drowned in the pool in 1989. Assis was the one to discover his father's body while returning home to celebrate his eighteenth birthday. After this death, Assis had to act as the head of the household, managing his career and later his brother's as well.

His mother went on to remarry another man who died of a heart attack in 2012.

== Football career ==
At the age of 16 Assis was already showing potential on Gremio's youth team and would gain the attention of Torino, who would try to steal the player in what would be dubbed 'the Assis Kidnap,' ultimately forcing Gremio to act quickly and sign on Assis by offering his family a sign on bonus of a new house with a swimming pool, where his father would drown.

Assis made a name for himself early on at Gremio, winning three consecutive state titles between 1988 and 1990. Despite this success, and interest for him to play on Brazil's national team in 1992, hardship would again find him as Assis suffered a serious knee injury in 1991, sidelining him for 8 months. Gremio would sell Assis to Swiss team FC Sion in 1992 who he would play with until 1995, where he would win his first Swiss Cup in 1995; before being loaned out to several teams, helping Sporting CP win the Portuguese Super Cup in 1995, before returning in 1996. He would stay through the 1997 season, helping his team win another cup and becoming Swiss Champions.

Then he went to stints in Portugal, Japan, Mexico, and returning to Brazil before finishing his athletic career with Montpellier HSC in France.

== Manager and agent ==
Assis's younger brother Ronaldo, now known as Ronaldinho, would emerge as a similarly desired talent at Gremio's youth team. Assis, who had experience in the world of association football as a negotiator and player and had taken on a paternal role for his brother, would act as manager for Ronaldinho throughout his career, until its end.

Assis would keep in touch with his brother while he played in Brazil, witnessing Gremio decline numerous offers for Ronaldinho until Assis would negotiate a transfer to Paris Saint-Germain, seen by some as revenge for being sold off to Sion years earlier. His reputation as a negotiator would become infamous as he managed all his brother's affairs and kept pressure on sponsors, with some going so far as to claim that he was controlling his brother's every action.

Assis would also be pivotal in the Nike deal which saw his brother join the list of athletes who would be part of the Nike Tiempo shoe line.

=== Other Roles ===
While Assis agent career was given focus on due to his brother and client, Ronaldinho, he also served the interests of several other players including Rodrigo Gral as president of the Assis Moreira Group.

Assis also owns Brazilian club Porto Alegre, which currently plays the Campeonato Gaúcho.

== Personal life ==
=== Relationship with Ronaldinho ===
Today, Assis acts as his brother's agent and adviser, and is credited by many, including Ronaldinho himself, as a major influence and guiding force for his brother. Assis has been described as an idol to his younger brother by some onlookers. Ronaldinho described his brother in January 2020 as a "brother, father, partner, [and] footballer" while onlookers, like Brazilian footballer Walter Casagrande, claimed Ronaldinho was simply being childish for relying too much on his older brother.

During his acceptance speech after receiving the FIFA World Player of the Year award for a second consecutive year in December 2005, Ronaldinho paid tribute to his brother: "He's my idol. He's been through a lot and has helped me every step of the way. He has encouraged me never to stop trying."

=== Son ===
Assis has also fathered a son who attempted to make a career in the sport like Assis and his uncle. His son, Diego Assis, joined Flamengo's youth team while Ronaldinho was playing for them and would leave alongside his uncle. Assis's son would go on to join Cruzeiro-RS for a short period in 2014 like Assis's father had previously done.

=== Legal troubles ===
Assis began having legal troubles in 2003 when he was arrested and sentenced to 5 years and 5 months under a 'semi-open regime' for money laundering.

He would later be fined roughly 1.5 million dollars, alongside his brother, for building a fishing platform along the Guaíba River in a 'heritage-protected' zone. They would ultimately lose their passports for not paying the fine in full.

In March 2020 he was questioned by police in Paraguay, along with his brother and Brazilian businessman Wilmondes Sousa Lira, after the two were alleged to have used fake passports to enter the country while coming for a charity event and book promotion. The brothers would go on to be jailed in Asunción although the fake passport charges would be dropped. The investigation evolve into allegations of the brothers being tied to a money laundering scheme connected to entrepreneur Dalia Lopez, who allegedly gave them the fake passports with help from businessman Wilmondes Sousa Lira, who had been traveling with the two brothers. They would be moved from jail to being placed under house arrest in a hotel, although their appeal to end house arrest would be denied due to them being a flight risk. They would eventually be released with a $110,000 fine for Assis and $90,000 fine for Ronaldinho after spending 5 months in custody.

== Career statistics ==
Appearances and goals by club, season and competition
Club	Season	League			National cup (Note: Includes Emperor's Cup.)		League cup (Note: Includes J.League Cup.)		Total	
Club	Season	Division	Apps	Goals	Apps	Goals	Apps	Goals	Apps	Goals
Consadole Sapporo	1999	J2 League	29	8	2	1	2	0	33	9
Total			29	8	2	1	2	0	33	9

== Honors ==
- Grêmio
  - Campeonato Gaúcho: 1988, 1989, 1990
  - Copa do Brasil: 1989
- Sion
  - Swiss Super League: 1997
  - Swiss Cup: 1995, 1997
- Sporting CP
  - Portuguese Super Cup 1995
