= Amata of Assisi =

Italian Roman Catholic saint

Saint Amata of Assisi OSC
- Born: Assisi, Italy
- Died: 1254 or 1255; Assisi
- Venerated in: Roman Catholic Church
- Feast: 20 February

Amata of Assisi (died 1254 or 1255) was a saint, a Poor Clare nun, and one of Saint Clare of Assisi's original followers. Amata was born into a noble family in Assisi, Italy; her father was Martino di Carano and her mother Donna Penenda, Clare's oldest sister. Her name means "beloved" in Latin and is a common religious name among the Poor Clares. Amata grew up "vivacious and pleasure-seeking". Her parents wanted Amata to marry and as her hagiographer Agnes Dunbar states, she was "pleased with dress and worldly vanity". Dunbar also reports that her aunt "grieved for the peril in which she saw her, and prayed that she might strive to please God rather than men". Amata was close to Clare while growing up, but Clare's piety left little impression on her, until she visited Clare at her monastery to get her advice about her engagement and chose to remain with Clare instead of marriage, despite the "desperate and violent pleas" of her friends and fiancé.

As Dunbar states, Amata was "inspired with a disgust for the world and desire for a religious life", and was cloistered at San Damiano, the church St. Francis of Assisi repaired early in his ministry and the first monastery founded for the Poor Clares by Clare. The Poor Clare Colettine Nuns of Rockford, Illinois website states that Amata's decision to become a nun was an answer to her aunt's prayers and that Amata was "aware of her need to atone for her former garish lifestyle, but was equally aware of Jesus’ tender mercy for a penitent heart". She entered religious life at San Damiano at Clare's admonition and exhortation, "with special zeal", and remained there for 20 years.

Amata suffered from chronic illness; she came down with dropsy and a bad cough for a year, combined with severe abdominal pain, a fever, and flu symptoms for thirteen months. As she reported in 1253, during her testimony of Clare's Process of Canonization shortly after Clare's death, Amata's stomach was so bloated, she was unable to bend forward. Clare laid hands on her and made the sign of the cross over her, and she was permanently healed by the next day. Amata cared for her aunt as she died and they experienced mystical visions together during that time.

Amata was one of those who was interviewed and testified during Clare's Process of Canonization, since she, along with four other members of the community, lived the longest with her at San Damiano. Amata testified to many of Clare's miracles and visions, and about her personality and religious practices. Joan Mueller, who wrote a book about Clare's life, writings, and spirituality, states, "As a result of these critical sources, Clare is one of the few women of the thirteenth century who life can be confidently reconstructed not on the basis of clerical witnesses, but in a truly feminine voice".

Amata died c. 1255 and was buried in the Monastery of San Damiano in Assisi; she was buried with her sister, Saint Balbina, who was also one of Clare's first followers. Amata's feast day is 20 February.

== Works cited ==
- Dunbar, Agnes B.C. (1905). A Dictionary of Saintly Women. Vol. 1. London: George Bell & Sons.
- Jacobilli, Lodovico (1647). Vite de' Santi, e Beati dell' Vmbria, e di qvelli, i corpi de' qvali riposano in essa provincia [Lives of the Saints and Blessed of Umbria, and of those whose bodies rest in that province] (in Italian and Latin). Vol. 1. Foligno.
