= Kristian Shevchenko =

Ukrainian footballer (born 2006)

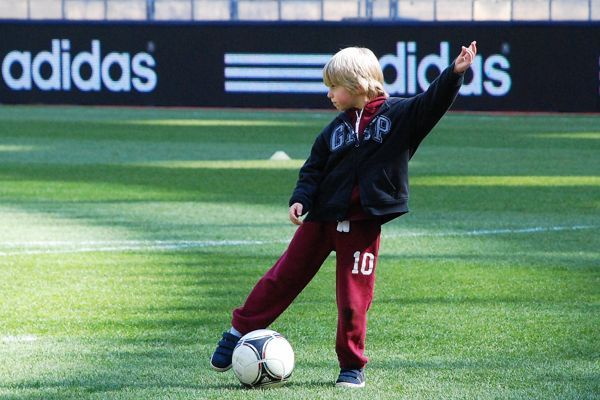
- Shevchenko in 2012.

Personal information
- Full name: Kristian Andriyovych Shevchenko
- Date of birth: 10 November 2006 (age 20)
- Place of birth: London, England
- Height: 5 ft 8 in (1.73 m)
- Positions: Forward; right winger

Team information
- Current team: Basingstoke Town FC
- Number: 9

Youth career
- –2022: Chelsea
- 2022–2023: Tottenham Hotspur
- 2023–2025: Watford

Senior career*
Years	Team	Apps	(Gls)
2025–2026	Watford	0	(0)
2026	Sholing	0	(0)
2026–	Basingstoke Town	3	(1)

International career
2024	Ukraine U19	11	(0)
2025	Ukraine U20	4	(0)
- * Club domestic league appearances and goals as of 12:00, 21 November 2026 (UTC)

Kristian Andriyovych Shevchenko (Ukrainian: Крістіан Андрійович Шевченко; born 10 November 2006) is a professional footballer who plays as a right winger for Southern League Premier Division South club Basingstoke Town. Born in England, he represents Ukraine at youth level.

== Club career ==
He was born in London and is the son of former Ukrainian footballer Andriy Shevchenko and American model Kristen Pazik.

He began his football career at Chelsea Academy and, in December 2022, joined Tottenham youth team, managed by Yaya Touré. In March 2023, he joined Championship club Watford as a scholar. On 23 December 2023, at the age of 17, he made his debut for Watford U21 in an FA Cup match against Tring Athletic. On 22 July 2025, he signed a professional contract with Watford for a period of one year and more. He was released by the Hornets at the end of the 2025–26 season.

On 2 October 2026, Shevchenko joined Southern League Premier Division South club Sholing. He joined divisional rivals Basingstoke Town later that same month.

== International career ==
In early 2024, it became known that Kristian Shevchenko could play for Ukraine at the international level. In addition to Ukraine, he is also eligible to play for the national teams of the United States, England, and Poland. In early February 2024, he submitted documents to obtain Ukrainian citizenship. At the end of February 2024, he was included in the reserve list for the Ukrainian U-19 national team. In early March 2024, he obtained Ukrainian citizenship. On 20 March 2024, he made his debut for Ukraine U-19 national team in a match against North Macedonia.

In 2025, he played for Ukraine U-20 national team in the 2025 FIFA U-20 World Cup.
