= Daan Huizing =

Dutch professional golfer (born 1990)

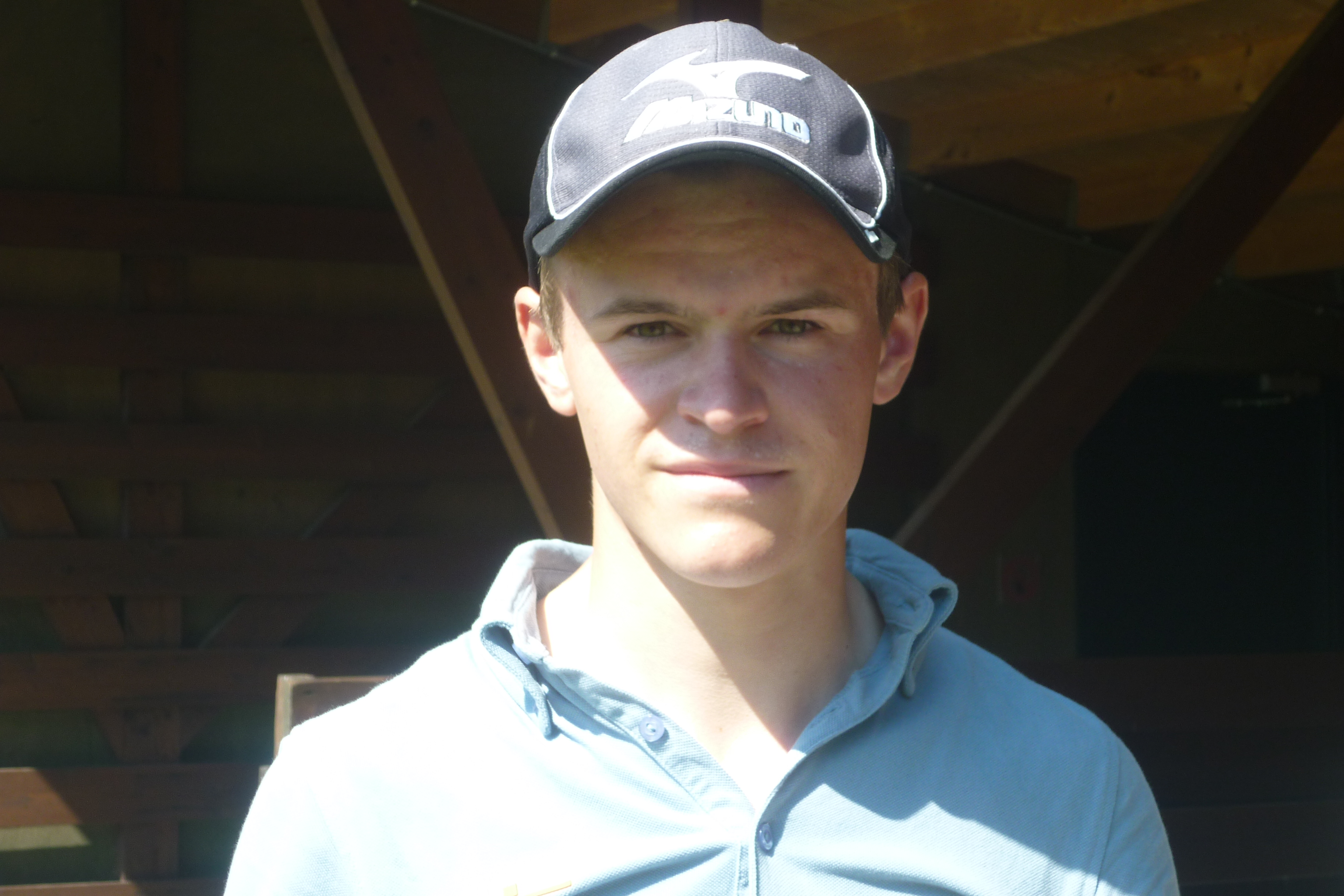

Personal information
- Nationality: Netherlands
- Born: 22 October 1990 (age 36) Zwolle, Netherlands
- Height: 1.77 m (5 ft 10 in)
- Weight: 65 kg (143 lb; 10.2 st)

Career
- Sport: Golf
- College: Utrecht University
- Turned professional: 2012
- Current tour: Challenge Tour
- Former tour: European Tour
- Professional wins: 6

Number of wins by tour
- Challenge Tour: 3
- Other: 3

Daan Huizing (born 22 October 1990) is a Dutch professional golfer.

== Career ==
Huizing entered the European Tour qualifying school at the end of 2012. Because of his high ranking as an amateur, he was exempt from the first stage of qualifying. He made it through to the third stage where he finished 80th, earning a place in some Challenge Tour events for 2013.

Huizing won twice in 2013, at the Northern Ireland Open Challenge and two weeks later at the Kharkov Superior Cup. He was also joint runner-up in the Kärnten Golf Open and finished the year in sixth place in the Challenge Tour standings, and graduated to the European Tour for 2014. Huizing had a disappointing 2014 with best finishes of tied for 12th place.

Since 2015 Huizing has mostly played on the Challenge Tour. Until 2021 his best finishes were joint runner-up finishes in the 2015 Cordon Golf Open and the 2017 Viking Challenge. In 2019 Huizing won the Jordan Mixed Open, a mixed event that included players from the Challenge Tour, the European Senior Tour and the Ladies European Tour. In 2021 he won the Irish Challenge on the Challenge Tour, beating Eduard Rousaud in a sudden-death playoff.

== Amateur wins ==
- 2010 Netherlands National Match Play
- 2011 National Stroke Play (Netherlands), German International Amateur, BrabantsOpen/Zomerwedstrijid, Turkish Amateur Open, Copa Juan Carlos Tailhade, Argentine Amateur Championship
- 2012 Lytham Trophy, St Andrews Links Trophy

== Professional wins (6) ==
=== Challenge Tour wins (3) ===
No.	Date	Tournament	Winning score	Margin of victory	Runner-up
1	1 Sep 2013	Northern Ireland Open Challenge	−13 (65-66-66-74=271)	Playoff	(England) Oliver Wilson
2	15 Sep 2013	Kharkov Superior Cup	−15 (70-69-67-67=273)	2 strokes	(United States) Sihwan Kim
3	30 May 2021	Irish Challenge	−9 (71-69-68-67=275)	Playoff	(Spain) Eduard Rousaud

Challenge Tour playoff record (2–0)

No.	Year	Tournament	Opponent	Result
1	2013	Northern Ireland Open Challenge	(England) Oliver Wilson	Won with birdie on first extra hole
2	2021	Irish Challenge	(Spain) Eduard Rousaud	Won with par on first extra hole

=== Other wins (3) ===
- 2010 Dutch National Open Championship (as an amateur)
- 2012 Dutch National Open Championship (as an amateur)
- 2019 Jordan Mixed Open

== Team appearances ==
Amateur

- European Boys' Team Championship (representing the Netherlands): 2007, 2008
- European Amateur Team Championship (representing the Netherlands): 2010
- Eisenhower Trophy (representing the Netherlands): 2010, 2012
- Bonallack Trophy (representing Europe): 2012 (winners)
- Palmer Cup (representing Europe): 2012 (winners)

Professional

- World Cup (representing the Netherlands): 2018

== See also ==
- 2013 Challenge Tour graduates
- 2021 Challenge Tour graduates
