= Andriy Shevchenko =

Ukrainian footballer and manager (born 1976))

Hero of Ukraine Andriy Shevchenko OS
- Андрій Шевченко
- Shevchenko in 2024

President of the Ukrainian Association of Football
- Incumbent
- Assumed office 25 January 2024
- Preceded by: Oleh Protasov

Personal details
- Born: Andriy Mykolayovych Shevchenko; 29 September 1976 (age 50) Dvirkivshchyna, Ukrainian SSR, Soviet Union (now Ukraine)
- Party: SDPU(u) (1998–2005); Ukraine – Forward! (2012)
- Spouse: Kristen Pazik (m. 2004)
- Children: 4
- Relatives: Mike Pazik (father-in-law)
- Occupation: Footballer; manager; sports administrator
Association football career
- Height: 1.83 m (6 ft 0 in)
- Position: Striker
Youth career
- 1986–1993: Dynamo Kyiv
Senior career*
Years	Team	Apps	(Gls)
1993–1996	Dynamo-2 Kyiv	51	(16)
1993–1999	Dynamo Kyiv	117	(60)
1999–2006	AC Milan	208	(127)
2006–2009	Chelsea	48	(9)
2008–2009	→ AC Milan (loan)	18	(0)
2009–2012	Dynamo Kyiv	55	(23)
Total		497	(235)
International career
1994–1995	Ukraine U19	8	(5)
1994–1995	Ukraine U21	7	(6)
1995–2012	Ukraine	111	(48)
Managerial career
- 2016–2021: Ukraine
- 2021–2022: Genoa
- * Club domestic league appearances and goals

Andriy Mykolayovych Shevchenko (Note: Also romanised as Andriy and Mykolayovych. Shevchenko has also been referred to as "Andrei Shevchenko" on occasion in the English media.) (Ukrainian: Андрій Миколайович Шевченко, pronounced [ɐnˈd⁽ʲ⁾r⁽ʲ⁾ij mekoˈlɑjowetʃ ʃeu̯ˈtʃɛnko]; born 29 September 1976) is a Ukrainian former football manager and player. Shevchenko is considered one of the greatest strikers of all time and Ukraine's greatest ever player. He is the all-time top scorer for the Ukraine national team with 48 goals.

Shevchenko began his career at Dynamo Kyiv and won five league titles in a row, as well as three domestic cups, before signing for AC Milan. In Milan, he established himself as one of the top strikers in Europe, and won Serie A in 2004. He later played for Chelsea (where he won both domestic cups in his first season), and returned to play for Milan on loan, and for Dynamo, where he finished his career. While playing for Milan and Chelsea, Shevchenko made the Champions League final on three occasions: winning in 2003 and as a runner-up in 2005 and 2008. He was named in the FIFA World XI for 2005. In 2004, he was named as one of the top 125 greatest living footballers as part of FIFA's 100th anniversary celebration, and in the same year, he also received the Ballon d'Or. In his international career, he led Ukraine as captain to the quarter-finals in their first ever FIFA World Cup appearance in 2006, and also took part at UEFA Euro 2012 on home soil.

Shevchenko is ranked as the ninth top goalscorer in all UEFA club competitions with 67 goals. With a tally of 175 goals scored for Milan, he is the second most prolific player in the history of the club, and is also the all-time top scorer of the Derby della Madonnina (the derby between Milan and their local rivals Inter Milan) with 14 goals.

Quitting football for politics in 2012, he stood for election to the Ukrainian Parliament in the October 2012 Ukrainian parliamentary election, but his party failed to win parliamentary representation. He returned to football in 2016, as assistant coach of the Ukraine national team February to July, at the time led by Mykhaylo Fomenko. In July 2016, Shevchenko was appointed Ukraine's head coach, and led the nation to the quarter-finals at UEFA Euro 2020. Following a short stint at Genoa, Shevchenko became the Vice President of the National Olympic Committee of Ukraine on 17 November 2022. He left the National Olympic Committee in January 2023 due to disagreement with the results of the election of its new President Vadym Gutzeit. In January 2024, Shevchenko was elected President of the Ukrainian Football Association.

== Early life ==
Shevchenko was born in Dvirkivshchyna, Ukrainian SSR, in 1976, into the family of Praporshchik Mykola Hryhorovych Shevchenko. In 1979, his family moved to the newly built neighbourhood in Kyiv – Obolon (Minsk District was created in 1975). In Kyiv, Shevchenko went to the 216th City School and in 1986 (aged 9) enrolled into the football section coached by Oleksandr Shpakov. Because of the accident at the Chernobyl Nuclear Power Plant, together with his sport group he was evacuated temporarily from the city. At an early age, he also was a competitive boxer in the LLWI Ukrainian junior league, but eventually he elected to move on to football.

== Club career ==
=== Dynamo Kyiv ===
In 1986, Shevchenko failed a dribbling test for entrance to a specialist sports school in Kyiv, but happened to catch the eye of a Dynamo Kyiv scout while playing in a youth tournament, and was thus brought to the club. Four years later, Shevchenko was in the Dynamo under-14 team for the Ian Rush Cup (now the Welsh Super Cup); he finished as the tournament's top scorer and was awarded a pair of Rush's boots as a reward by the then-Liverpool player. At the age of 15, his reputation was further enhanced as he scored twice in a televised match between the youth teams of Ukraine and Netherlands (2-2).

Shevchenko started out his professional career at age 16 when he came on for only 12 minutes as a substitute in a 0–2 home loss to the Odesa second team Chornomorets-2 Odesa on 5 May 1993. He was a substitute for the last six home games of the 1992–93 Ukrainian First League and did not score any goals. The next 1993–94 season in the second tier, Shevchenko was the top goalscorer for Dynamo-2 with 12 goals, and he made his first appearance in the starting XI. Shevchenko scored his first goal against Krystal Chortkiv in a 1–1 home draw on 7 October 1993. During the same season, he recorded his first hat-trick in a home game against Artania Ochakiv on 21 November 1993 which Dynamo-2 won 4–1. Shevchenko stayed with Dynamo-2 until the end of 1994 and was once again called up for one game in late 1996.

He made his Vyshcha Liha debut for Dynamo Kiev on 8 November 1994 in an away game against Shakhtar Donetsk when he was 18. It was actually his second game for the senior squad overall after he had played a home game of the National Cup on 5 November 1994 against Skala Stryi. That year, Shevchenko became a national champion and a cup holder with Dynamo. He won his second league title the next season, scoring 6 goals in 20 matches. He scored a hat-trick in the first half of a 1997–98 UEFA Champions League away match against Barcelona, which Dynamo won 4–0; no other visitor to the Camp Nou scored a Champions League treble until 2021. His 19 goals in 23 league matches and six goals in ten Champions League matches (including a hat-trick over two legs against Real Madrid) were followed by a total of 33 goals in all competitions in the 1998–99 season. He won the domestic league title with Dynamo in each of his five seasons with the club.

=== AC Milan ===
In 1999, Shevchenko joined Italian club Milan for a then-record transfer fee of $25 million. He made his league debut on 28 August 1999 in a 2–2 draw with Lecce. Alongside five other players – Michel Platini, John Charles, Gunnar Nordahl, István Nyers, and Ferenc Hirzer – he managed, as a foreign player, to win the Serie A best goalscorer award in his debut season, finishing with 24 goals in 32 matches. Shevchenko maintained his excellent form into the 2000–01 season, scoring 24 goals in 34 matches, including nine goals in 14 Champions League games. During the same season, he also reunited with Kakha Kaladze as teammates when Milan signed the Georgian defender from Dynamo Kyiv in January 2001.

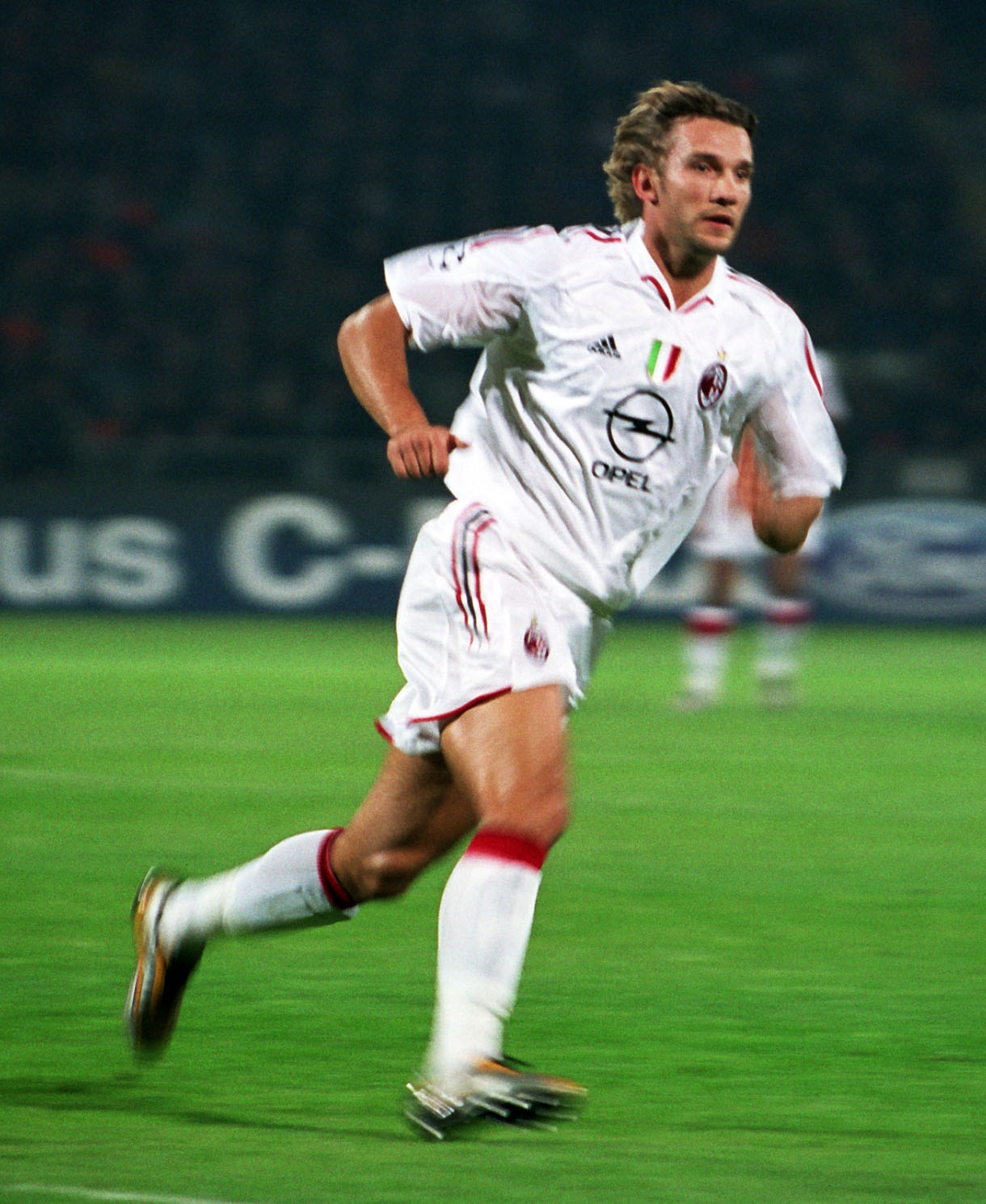
Shevchenko with AC Milan during a UEFA Champions League game in 2004

Despite netting only five times in 24 matches, mainly due to injuries, Shevchenko became the first Ukrainian-born player to win the Champions League after Milan lifted their sixth trophy in 2002–03. He scored the crucial away goal against rivals Inter Milan in the semi-final, and then scored the winning penalty in the shoot out against Juventus in the final, which had ended goalless after extra time. Following Milan's Champions League victory, Shevchenko flew to Kyiv to put his medal by the grave of his former manager Valeriy Lobanovskyi, who died in 2002. He also scored the winning goal in the 2003 UEFA Super Cup victory over Porto. Shevchenko finished top goalscorer in Serie A in 2003–04 for the second time in his career, scoring 24 goals in 32 matches as Milan won the Scudetto for the first time in five years, leading to Milan's second trophy of the season. In August 2004, he scored three goals against Lazio as Milan won the Supercoppa Italiana. Shevchenko capped off the year by being awarded the 2004 Ballon d'Or, becoming the third Ukrainian player ever to win the award after Oleg Blokhin and Igor Belanov. In the same year, Shevchenko was also inducted into the FIFA 100.

He scored 17 goals in the 2004–05 season after missing several games with a fractured cheekbone. Shevchenko made Champions League history the following season; on 23 November 2005, he scored all four goals in Milan's 4–0 group stage drubbing of Fenerbahçe, becoming only the fifth player to accomplish this feat; his company includes Marco van Basten, Simone Inzaghi, Dado Pršo and Ruud van Nistelrooy (while Lionel Messi joined that group in the 2009–10 season and Robert Lewandowski in 2012–13 and 2019–20), and Shevchenko was the only player to have done it in an away game until Olivier Giroud did so for Chelsea, away to Sevilla, in the 2020–21 season. Milan eventually lost the tournament when Shevchenko missed the deciding penalty in the final shoot-out against Liverpool. In the 2005–06 Champions League, he scored his last Milan goal in the second leg of the quarter-final as they eliminated Lyon after a last-minute comeback in a 3–1 victory. In the semi-final, Milan lost to eventual winners Barcelona 1–0, a match where Shevchenko controversially had a last minute equaliser denied by the referee. Despite this, he still ended up being the top scorer of the whole competition with 9 goals in 12 games.

On 8 February 2006, Shevchenko became Milan's second highest all-time goalscorer, behind Gunnar Nordahl, after netting against Treviso. He finished the season as joint fourth-top scorer with 19 goals in 28 games. Shevchenko ended his seven-year stint with Milan with 175 goals in 296 games.

=== Chelsea ===
During the summer of 2005, there were persistent reports that Chelsea owner Roman Abramovich offered a record sum €73 million and striker Hernán Crespo to Milan in exchange for Shevchenko. Milan refused the monetary offer but took Crespo on loan. Chelsea chief executive Peter Kenyon was quoted as saying, "I think Shevchenko is the type of player we would like. At the end of the day to improve what we have got, it has to be a great player and Shevchenko certainly comes into that class." Shevchenko cited that the persistence of Abramovich was a key factor in his move. Milan, desperate to keep the striker, offered Shevchenko a six-year contract extension.

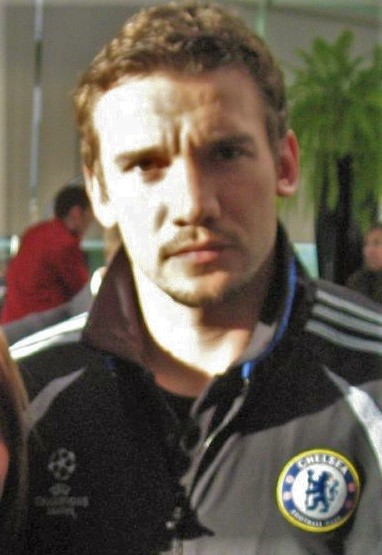
Shevchenko with Chelsea in 2007

On 28 May 2006, Shevchenko left Milan for Chelsea for £30.8 million (€43.875 million), topping Michael Essien's transfer fee from the previous year and also breaking the record for a player signed by an English club. He received the number seven shirt, as Chelsea manager José Mourinho said that Shevchenko could continue wearing it.

Shevchenko made his debut for Chelsea on 13 August 2006 in the FA Community Shield, scoring his side's goal in a 2–1 loss to Liverpool. On 23 August, he scored his first Premier League goal – and his 300th in top-flight and international football – in a 2–1 loss to Middlesbrough. He scored goals sporadically throughout the season, including equalisers against Porto and Valencia in the 2006–07 Champions League and another against London rival club Tottenham Hotspur in the FA Cup to help take his side into the semi-final. He finished with a total of 14 from 51 games. During the campaign, he netted his 57th career goal in European competitions, leaving him second behind Gerd Müller on the all-time European goalscorers list, before Filippo Inzaghi made the record his own in the 2007–08 Champions League. Shevchenko's 2006–07 season was cut short due to injury and a hernia operation. He missed the Champions League semi-final against Liverpool and the FA Cup final against Manchester United at the new Wembley Stadium on 19 May 2007. He did, however, start for Chelsea in the 2007 League Cup final victory over Arsenal in which he hit the crossbar which would have given Chelsea a 3–1 lead.

Shevchenko was handed his first start of the 2007–08 season against Blackburn Rovers at home to cover for the injured Didier Drogba, but the game finished goalless. His first goal of the season came three days later, equalising for Chelsea in a match against Rosenborg, which turned out to be Mourinho's last game as manager of Chelsea. Throughout the season, Shevchenko was in and out of the starting line-up because of injuries and the appointment of Avram Grant following the departure of Mourinho. During the Christmas period, however, Shevchenko enjoyed a good run of form. He scored the first goal in Chelsea's 2–0 win over Sunderland, and he was named man of the match in Chelsea's 4–4 draw against Aston Villa at Stamford Bridge, scoring twice (including a stunning 25-yard shot into the top left hand corner) and assisting Alex to make the score 3–2 in Chelsea's favour. Shevchenko scored his last goal in the 2007–08 season in a 1–1 draw with Bolton Wanderers. He finished the season with five league goals in 17 games. Shevchenko also played a part in a pre-season match which was against his former team, Milan.

==== Loan to AC Milan ====
Shevchenko was not used very often in the starting line-up at Chelsea, and with the appointment of Luiz Felipe Scolari, he was deemed surplus to requirements. Due to this, Milan vice-president Adriano Galliani offered to take Shevchenko back to the San Siro and Shevchenko was loaned back to his old club for the 2008–09 season.

Shevchenko failed to score any league goals and only scored 2 goals in 26 appearances, starting only nine of those games. He returned to Chelsea for the final year of his four-year contract, where he was joined by his former Milan manager Carlo Ancelotti.

==== Departure ====
Shevchenko was not even on the bench for Chelsea's penalty shoot-out victory over Manchester United at Wembley at the weekend in the season-opening Community Shield. After making a late appearance for Chelsea in their second game of the 2009–10 season, Ancelotti announced that Shevchenko would be likely to leave Chelsea before the summer transfer window closed. Despite this, Ancelotti said it had nothing to do with his decision to leave Shevchenko out of Chelsea's 2009–10 Champions League squad, but just to continue playing first-team football.

=== Return to Dynamo Kyiv ===
On 28 August 2009, Shevchenko signed a two-year deal at his former club Dynamo Kyiv, and scored a penalty-goal in his first game upon returning to his former club against Metalurh Donetsk in Dynamo's 3–1 victory on 31 August. He was mostly used as a left winger and central midfielder, and was named left winger in the 2009 team of the season. On 16 September, Shevchenko played his first Champions League match after returning to Dynamo, against Rubin Kazan, in Dynamo's first game of the 2009–10 season. In October, he was named the best player of the Ukrainian Premier League. On 4 November, he scored a goal in the game against Inter Milan, cross-city rivals of his former club AC Milan, in the fourth game of the Champions League season. It was the 15th goal he had scored against Inter in his career.

On 28 July 2012, Shevchenko announced that he was quitting football for politics.

== International career ==
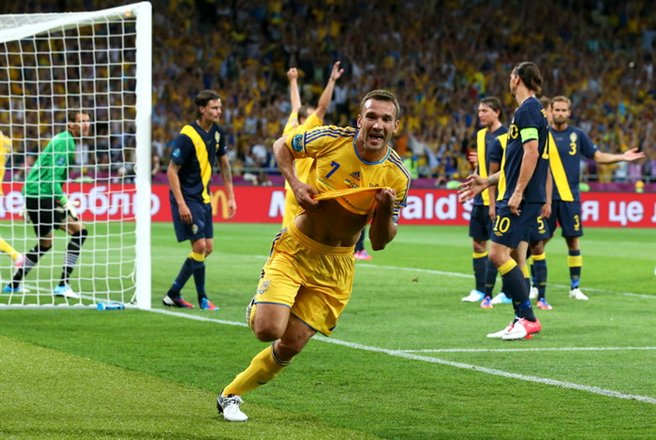
Shevchenko celebrates scoring against Sweden at Euro 2012.

Shevchenko earned 111 appearances and scored 48 goals for the Ukraine national team, representing the country at the 2006 FIFA World Cup and UEFA Euro 2012. He debuted in 1995 in a friendly match against Croatia and scored his first international goal in May 1996 in another friendly match against Turkey.

Shevchenko scored six goals in qualifying for the 2006 World Cup, to take his country to its first ever major tournament. He captained the team at the finals and scored in Ukraine's first ever World Cup win, a 4–0 defeat of Saudi Arabia. He then scored the winning goal from a penalty kick as Ukraine beat Tunisia 1–0 to qualify for the second round where, despite Shevchenko failing with their first kick, Ukraine knocked out Switzerland on penalties. Ukraine were then beaten 3–0 by eventual champions Italy at the quarter-final stage.

In a 21 December 2009 interview with UEFA, Shevchenko declared that he was keen to play in his home country at Euro 2012. "After a disappointing 2010 World Cup qualifying campaign, that is my new challenge, or even dream. I will do everything to achieve that." In May 2012, Shevchenko was named in the Ukrainian squad for Euro 2012. In Ukraine's opening game, Shevchenko scored two headers to beat Sweden 2–1 in Group D. After his country was eliminated from the group, Shevchenko announced he would retire from international football, having been Ukraine's youngest and oldest goalscorer and record marksman with 48 goals in 111 appearances.

== Player profile ==
=== Style of play ===
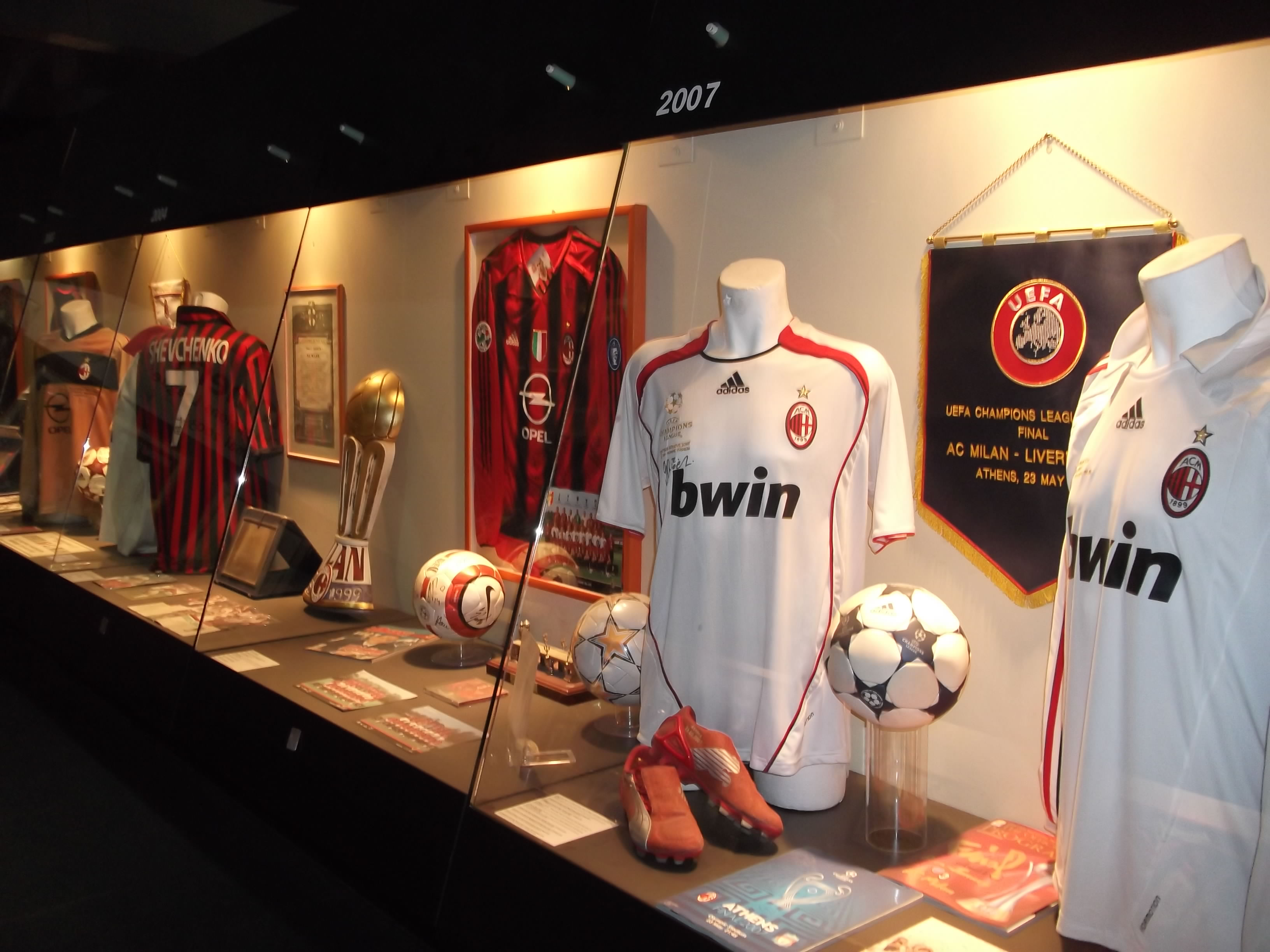
Shevchenko's number 7 Milan jersey in the San Siro museum

A fast and well-rounded striker, Shevchenko was a highly opportunistic goalscorer, who was usually deployed as an out-and-out striker in a centre-forward role, although he was capable of operating anywhere along the front line. He often played in a free role, in which he could attack from the left wing, and get past opposing defenders into the penalty area. He also occupied a wider position as an outright winger on the left flank at times, in particular at the beginning of his career, and also during his second stint with Dynamo Kyiv during his later years; he was also capable of playing on the right. Shevchenko was also effective from set-pieces, and was an accurate penalty taker. A strong and physical striker with a clinical eye for goal, he was primarily known for his excellent positional sense, movement off the ball, and finishing ability inside the box, as well as his composure in front of goal; moreover, he possessed a powerful and accurate shot with either foot, from both inside and outside the area. Although he was not known to take part in aerial duels frequently, he was also good in the air, due to his heading ability. Often compared by pundits to fellow former Milan striker Marco van Basten, although he was not as elegant as the Dutch forward, he also possessed good technical skills himself, which along with his pace and physicality, made him effective when dribbling or carrying the ball at speed on the run. Furthermore, despite mainly being a goalscorer, he was capable of playing off of his teammates and providing assists, in addition to scoring goals himself, due to his link-up play.

=== Reception ===
Shevchenko is considered by several pundits to be one of the greatest strikers of all time, as well as one of the best footballers of his generation, and Ukraine's greatest player ever. In 2004, he was named by Pelé as one of the top 125 greatest living footballers as part of FIFA's 100th anniversary celebration.

== Coaching and managerial career ==
=== Ukraine national team ===
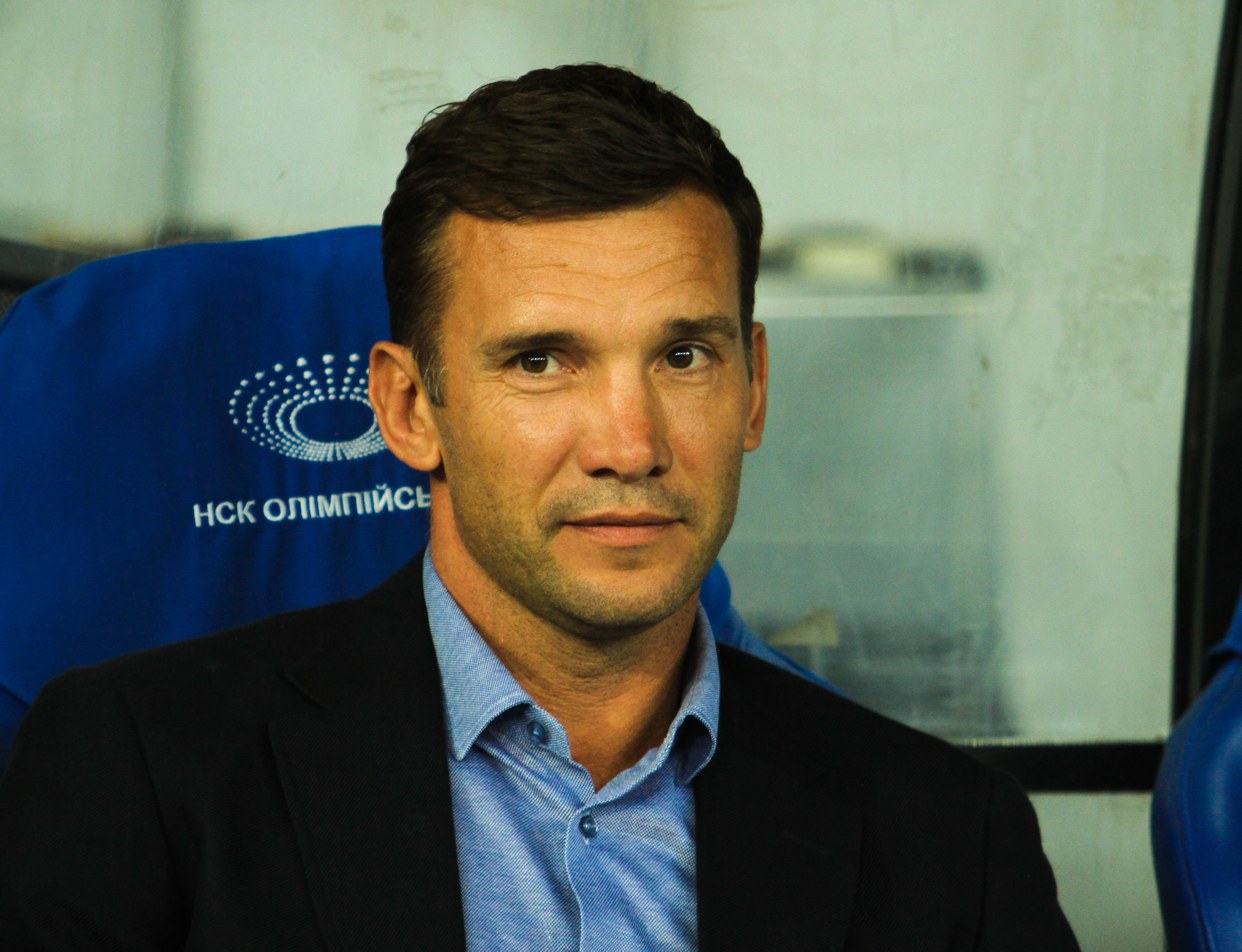
Shevchenko during a game between Ukraine and Iceland in 2016

In November 2012, Shevchenko initially refused to accept Football Federation of Ukraine's proposal to become head coach of the Ukraine national team.

From 16 February to 15 July 2016, Shevchenko served as the assistant manager of the Ukraine national team. On 15 July 2016, Shevchenko was appointed as manager of the Ukraine national team. The 39-year-old replaced Mykhaylo Fomenko, whose four-year spell ended with elimination at the group stage of Euro 2016. He signed a two-year contract with the possibility of another two-year extension. Former Italy and Milan defender Mauro Tassotti, who was assistant coach when Shevchenko was at Milan, joined his coaching staff, as did former Dynamo coach Raúl Riancho, and former Milan Youth System coach Andrea Maldera. On 14 October 2019, Shevchenko led Ukraine to qualify for Euro 2020 with a 2–1 home win over reigning European champions Portugal.

At UEFA Euro 2020, Shevchenko led Ukraine to reach the quarter-finals of the European Championship for the first time in their history. His side finished as one of the four best third-placed teams in the group stage, then beating Sweden in extra time in the round of 16 and suffering an exit to England in the next round. Despite Ukraine's successful tournament, on 1 August 2021, he announced his departure from the post.

=== Genoa ===
On 7 November 2021, Shevchenko was announced as the new head coach of Serie A side Genoa, following the club's takeover by US investment firm 777 Partners, replacing Davide Ballardini. He signed a contract until 2024 for the 18th-placed team who had won once in 12 games. Two weeks later, he lost 2–0 on his debut at home to Roma, managed by his former Chelsea boss José Mourinho. On 15 January 2022, Shevchenko was sacked after two months having won just one match and lost seven during the time.

== Political career ==
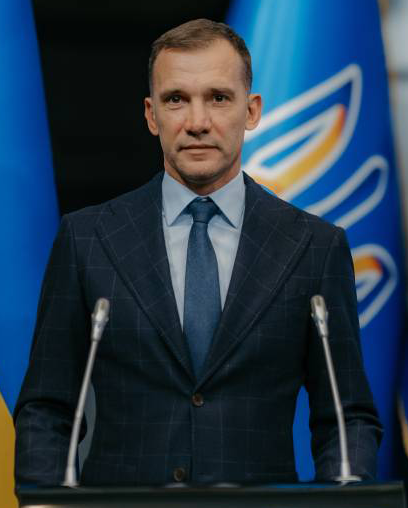
Andriy Shevchenko in 2024.

In the late 1990s, Shevchenko and other teammates of Dynamo Kyiv publicly backed the Social Democratic Party of Ukraine (united), whose members were the club's then-owner and president Hryhoriy Surkis and then-vice president Viktor Medvedchuk.

After his retirement in June 2012, Shevchenko immediately joined Ukraine – Forward! (formerly known as Ukrainian Social Democratic Party) and took second place on the party list for the October 2012 Ukrainian parliamentary election. This was in spite of him stating a month earlier that he wanted to coach after his playing career: "This is the world I understand, the world I want to stay in." In the election his party won 1.58% of the national votes and no constituencies and thus failed to win parliamentary representation.

== National Olympic Committee of Ukraine ==
Shevchenko became the Vice President of the National Olympic Committee of Ukraine on 17 November 2022. He left the National Olympic Committee in January 2023 due to disagreement with the results of the election of its new President Vadym Gutzeit.

== Personal life ==
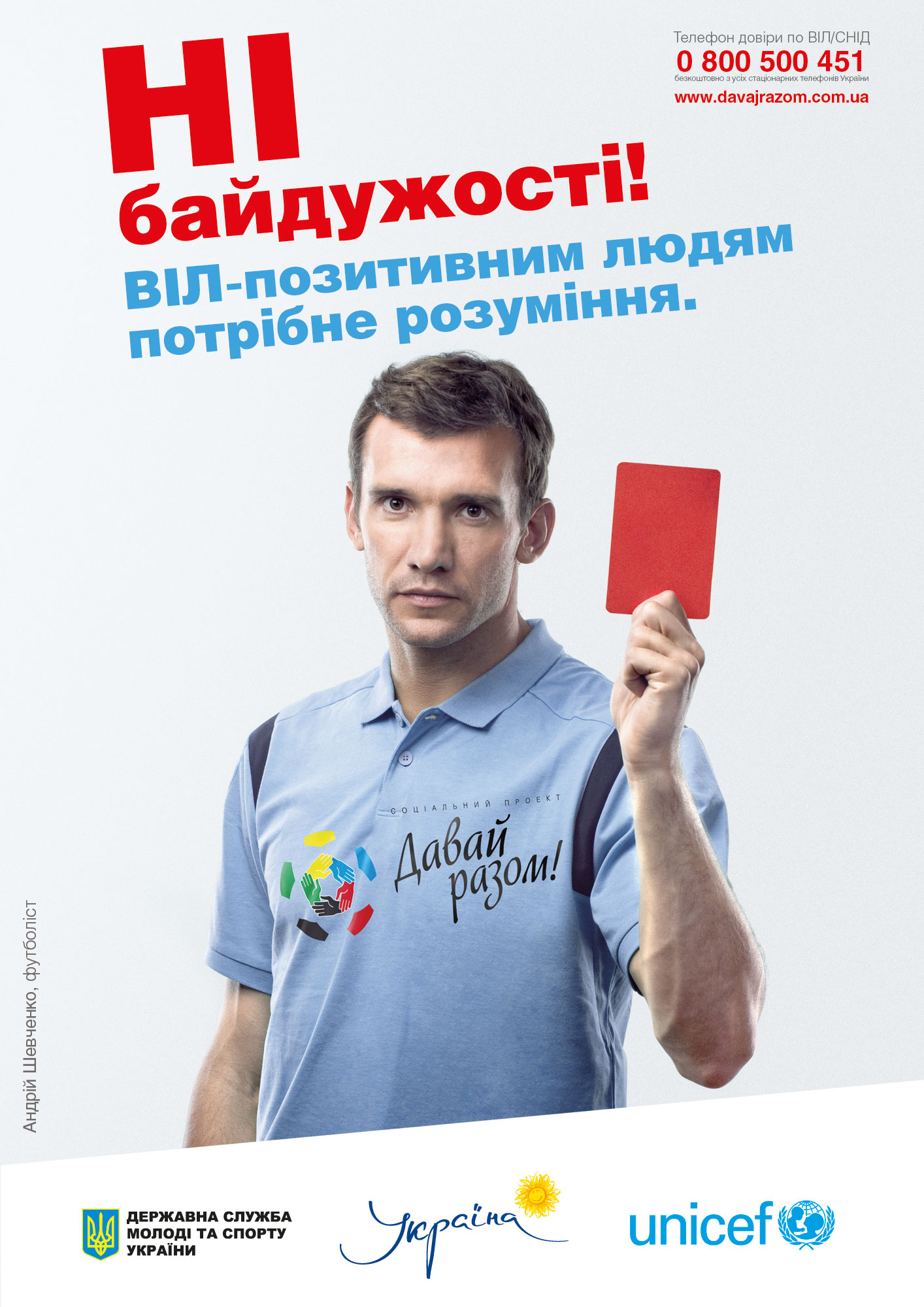
Shevchenko in a poster campaign for the Ukrainian branch of UNICEF, 2012

Shevchenko's first name (Андрій in Ukrainian) has multiple ways of being transliterated from its original spelling in the Ukrainian Cyrillic alphabet into the Latin alphabet; Andriy is the spelling used throughout the player's official web site. It has also been adopted by UEFA and FIFA and is the preferred spelling in most English publications.

Shevchenko is married to American model Kristen Pazik, daughter of baseball player Mike Pazik. The couple met at a Giorgio Armani afterparty in 2002 and married on 14 July 2004 in a private ceremony on a golf course in Washington, D.C. As of 2006, the couple communicated in Italian as he did not speak English and she did not speak Ukrainian. After his return to Dynamo Kyiv in August 2009, the couple declared that they want their children to learn Ukrainian.

The couple have four sons born between 2004 and 2014. Shevchenko commemorated his first son's birth by scoring the only goal against Sampdoria; Milan owner and former Prime Minister of Italy Silvio Berlusconi was the boy's godfather. The day after his second son's birth in 2006, Shevchenko scored in a 4–0 Chelsea victory over Watford and he and several of his teammates gathered and performed the popular "rock-the-baby" goal celebration as a tribute.

Shevchenko was a close friend of fashion designer Giorgio Armani, and modelled for Armani and opened two boutiques with him in Kyiv. With his wife, he has started an e-commerce website called Ikkon.com, dedicated to men's fashion and lifestyle.

In June 2005, he became an ambassador for the SOS Children's Villages charity. Shevchenko also has a foundation to support orphaned children.

In 2022, Shevchenko became an ambassador for United24, a government-supported aid organization in Ukraine.

Shevchenko, an avid golfer, participated in his first professional golf tournament, the Kharkov Superior Cup, in September 2013.

Shevchenko represented the Rest of the World team against England for Soccer Aid on 8 June 2014.

Besides Russian, Shevchenko also speaks English, Italian and to some extent Ukrainian. He has said that he is working to improve his Ukrainian.

Shevchenko has appealed for an end to the War in Ukraine and the Russian invasion of Ukraine.

== Media ==
Shevchenko features in EA Sports' FIFA video game series; he was on the cover of FIFA 2005, and was introduced as one of the Ultimate Team Legends in FIFA 14 and was an Ultimate Team Legend until FIFA 18, when he became an Icon, as Legends were rebranded to Icons. Featured in various versions of Konami' Pro Evolution Soccer video game series.

== Career statistics ==
=== Club ===
Appearances and goals by club, season and competition
Club	Season	League			National cup (Note: Includes Ukrainian Cup, Coppa Italia, FA Cup)		League cup (Note: Includes Football League Cup)		Europe		Other		Total	
Club	Season	Division	Apps	Goals	Apps	Goals	Apps	Goals	Apps	Goals	Apps	Goals	Apps	Goals
Dynamo-2 Kyiv	1992–93	Ukrainian First League	6	0	—		—		—		—		6	0
Dynamo-2 Kyiv	1993–94	Ukrainian First League	31	12	1	0	—		—		—		32	12
Dynamo-2 Kyiv	1994–95	Ukrainian First League	13	4	4	5 (Note: 5 of its 6 goals were marked with FC Dynamo-2 Kyiv in Ukrainian Cup)	—		—		—		17	9
Dynamo-2 Kyiv	1996–97	Ukrainian First League	1	0	—		—		—		—		1	0
Dynamo-2 Kyiv	Total		51	16	5	5	—		—		—		56	21
Dynamo Kyiv	1994–95	Vyshcha Liha	17	1	4	1	—		2	1	—		23	3
Dynamo Kyiv	1995–96	Vyshcha Liha	31	16	5	1	—		2	2	—		38	19
Dynamo Kyiv	1996–97	Vyshcha Liha	20	6	—		—		—		—		20	6
Dynamo Kyiv	1997–98	Vyshcha Liha	23	19	8	8	—		10 (Note: Appearances in UEFA Champions League)	6	—		41	33
Dynamo Kyiv	1998–99	Vyshcha Liha	26	18	4	5	—		14	10	—		44	33
Dynamo Kyiv	Total		117	60	21	15	—		28	19	—		166	94 (Note: Does not include 12 goals scored in Commonwealth of Independent States Cup (1996–1998))
Milan	1999–2000	Serie A	32	24	4	4	—		6	1	1 (Note: Appearance in Supercoppa Italiana)	0	43	29
Milan	2000–01	Serie A	34	24	3	1	—		14	9	—		51	34
Milan	2001–02	Serie A	29	14	3	0	—		6 (Note: Appearances in UEFA Cup)	3	—		38	17
Milan	2002–03	Serie A	24	5	4	1	—		11	4	—		39	10
Milan	2003–04	Serie A	32	24	1	0	—		9	4	3 (Note: One appearance in Supercoppa Italiana, one appearance and one goal in UEFA Super Cup, one appearance in Intercontinental Cup)	1	45	29
Milan	2004–05	Serie A	29	17	0	0	—		10	6	1	3	40	26
Milan	2005–06	Serie A	28	19	0	0	—		12	9	—		40	28
Milan	Total		208	127	15	6	—		68	36	5	4	296	173
Chelsea	2006–07	Premier League	30	4	6	3	4	3	10	3	1 (Note: Appearance in FA Community Shield)	1	51	14
Chelsea	2007–08	Premier League	17	5	1	0	2	2	5	1	0	0	25	8
Chelsea	2009–10	Premier League	1	0	0	0	0	0	0	0	0	0	1	0
Chelsea	Total		48	9	7	3	6	5	15	4	1	1	77	22
Milan (loan)	2008–09	Serie A	18	0	1	1	—		7	1	—		26	2
Dynamo Kyiv	2009–10	Ukrainian Premier League	21	7	2	0	—		6	1	—		29	8
Dynamo Kyiv	2010–11	Ukrainian Premier League	18	10	2	1	—		12 (Note: Four appearances and two goals in UEFA Champions League, eight appearances and three goals in UEFA Europa League)	5	—		32	16
Dynamo Kyiv	2011–12	Ukrainian Premier League	16	6	1	0	—		5 (Note: Appearances in UEFA Europa League)	0	0	0	22	6
Dynamo Kyiv	Total		55	23	5	1	—		23	6	0	0	83	30
Career total			498	235	54	31	6	5	141	67	6	5	705	343

=== International ===
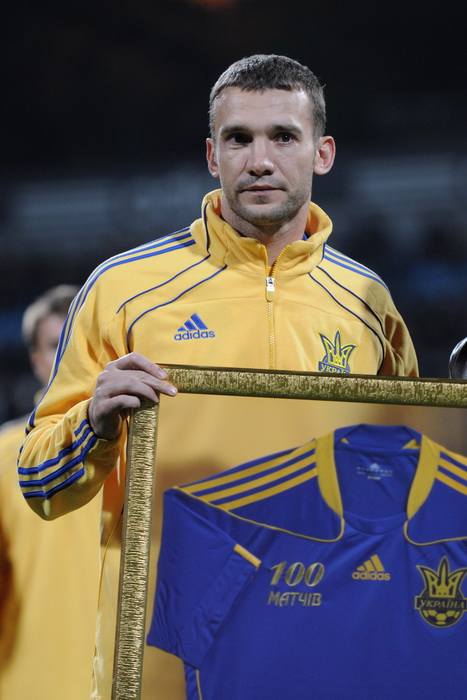
Shevchenko presented with a Ukraine shirt before making his 100th appearance in 2010.

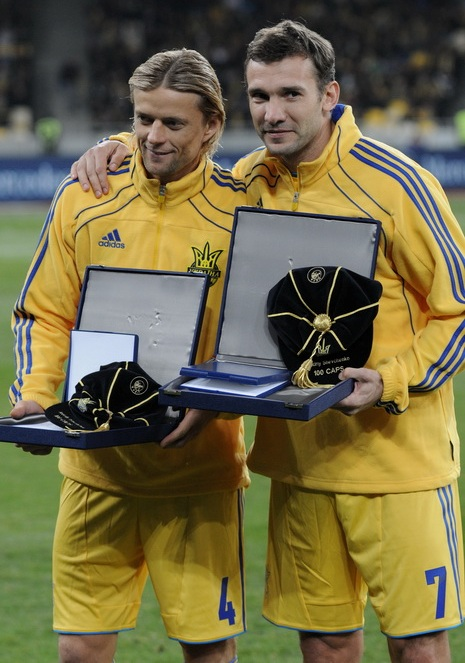
Anatoliy Tymoshchuk and Shevchenko being honoured by UEFA in 2011 for their 100th cap. They are the first and third, respectively, most capped players in the history of Ukraine.

Appearances and goals by national team and year
National team	Year	Apps	Goals
Ukraine	1995	2	0
Ukraine	1996	2	1
Ukraine	1997	8	4
Ukraine	1998	6	1
Ukraine	1999	9	2
Ukraine	2000	5	5
Ukraine	2001	7	6
Ukraine	2002	3	0
Ukraine	2003	8	3
Ukraine	2004	6	4
Ukraine	2005	6	2
Ukraine	2006	9	5
Ukraine	2007	8	3
Ukraine	2008	7	3
Ukraine	2009	8	4
Ukraine	2010	6	2
Ukraine	2011	5	1
Ukraine	2012	6	2
Total		111	48

== Managerial statistics ==
As of match played 13 January 2022

Team	Nat	From	To	Record				
Team	Nat	From	To	G	W	D	L	Win %
Ukraine	(Ukraine)	15 July 2016	1 August 2021	52	25	13	14	48.1
Genoa	(Italy)	7 November 2021	15 January 2022	11	1	3	7	9.1
Total				63	26	16	21	41.3

== Honours ==
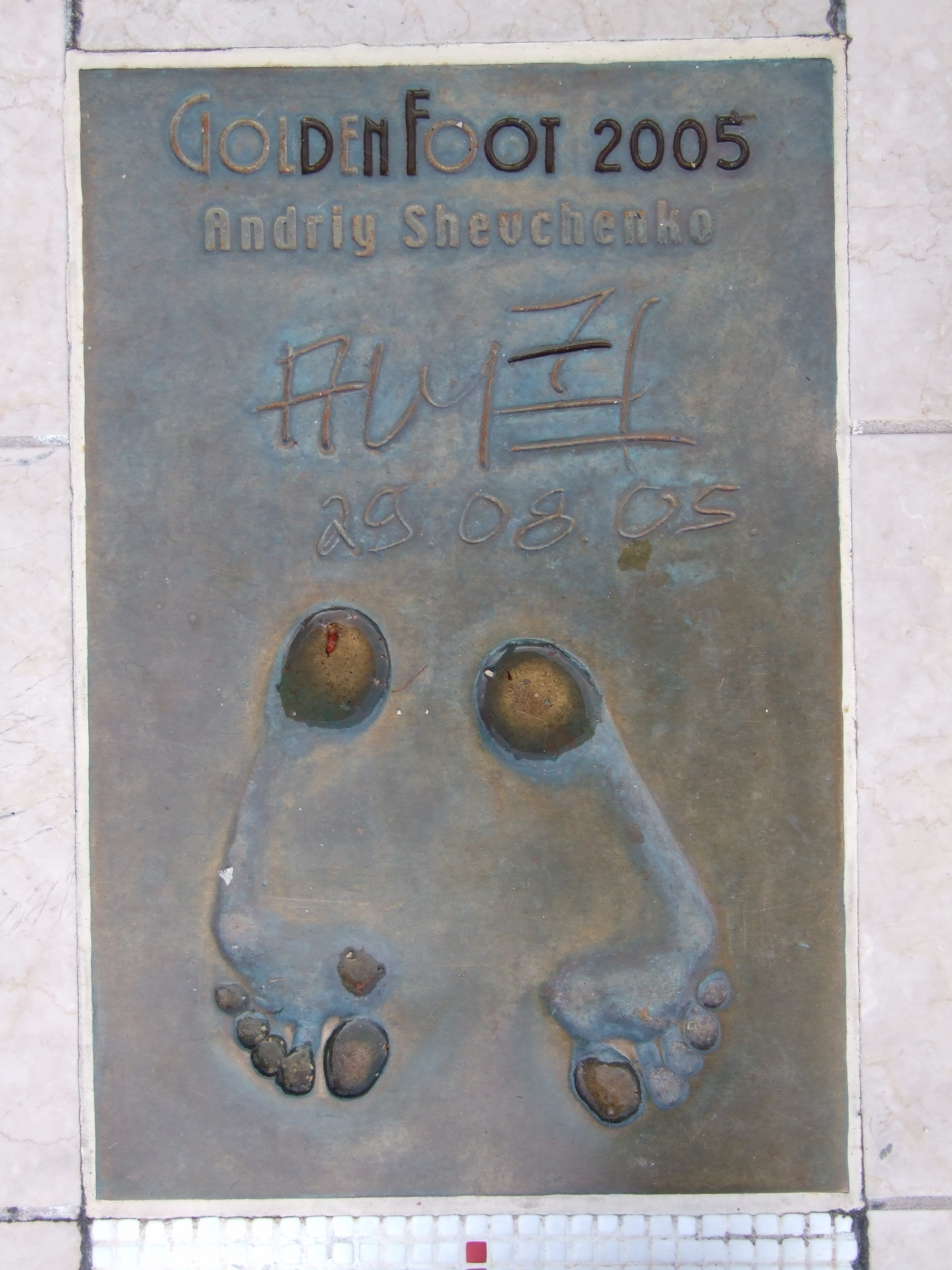
Shevchenko's 2005 Golden Foot imprint

Dynamo Kyiv

- Vyshcha Liha: 1994–95, 1995–96, 1996–97, 1997–98, 1998–99
- Ukrainian Cup: 1995–96, 1997–98, 1998–99
- Ukrainian Super Cup: 2011
- Commonwealth of Independent States Cup: 1996, 1997, 1998

AC Milan

- Serie A: 2003–04
- Coppa Italia: 2002–03
- Supercoppa Italiana: 2004
- UEFA Champions League: 2002–03; runner-up: 2004–05
- UEFA Super Cup: 2003

Chelsea

- FA Cup: 2006–07
- Football League Cup: 2006–07
- UEFA Champions League runner-up: 2007–08

Individual

- Ballon d'Or: 2004
- Ukrainian Footballer of the Year: 1997, 1999, 2000, 2001, 2004, 2005
- CIS Cup top goalscorer: 1997 (shared)
- CIS Cup Team of the Competition: 1997
- Vyscha Liha Footballer of the Year: 1997
- UEFA Champions League top scorer: 1998–99 (8 goals), 2005–06 (9 goals)
- ESM Team of the Year: 1999–2000, 2003–04, 2004–05
- UEFA Club Forward of the Year: 1998–99
- ADN Eastern European Footballer of the Season: 2000, 2004, 2005
- UEFA Team of the Year: 2004, 2005
- Serie A Foreign Footballer of the Year: 2000
- Serie A top scorer: 1999–2000 (24 goals), 2003–04 (24 goals)
- Serie A Goal of the Year: 2004
- Baltic and Commonwealth of Independent States Footballer of the Year: 2004, 2005
- Golden Foot: 2005
- FIFPro World XI: 2005
- FIFA 100
- AC Milan Hall of Fame
- Pallone d'Argento: 2003–04
- L'Équipe Team of the Year: 2004, 2005.
- World Soccer's 100 Greatest Players of the 20th Century
- FIFA World Player of the Year
  - 7th place (1999)
  - 5th place (2000)
  - 9th place (2001)
  - 10th place (2003)
  - 3rd place (2004)
  - 6th place (2005)
- World's best man national coach of the decade 2011–2020, ranked by IFFHS: 17th place
- IFFHS World's Best National Coach:
  - 8th place (2019)
  - 9th place (2020)
- Italian Football Hall of Fame: 2023

=== Orders ===
- National Legend of Ukraine (Ukraine, 2022)
- Hero of Ukraine (Ukraine, 2004)
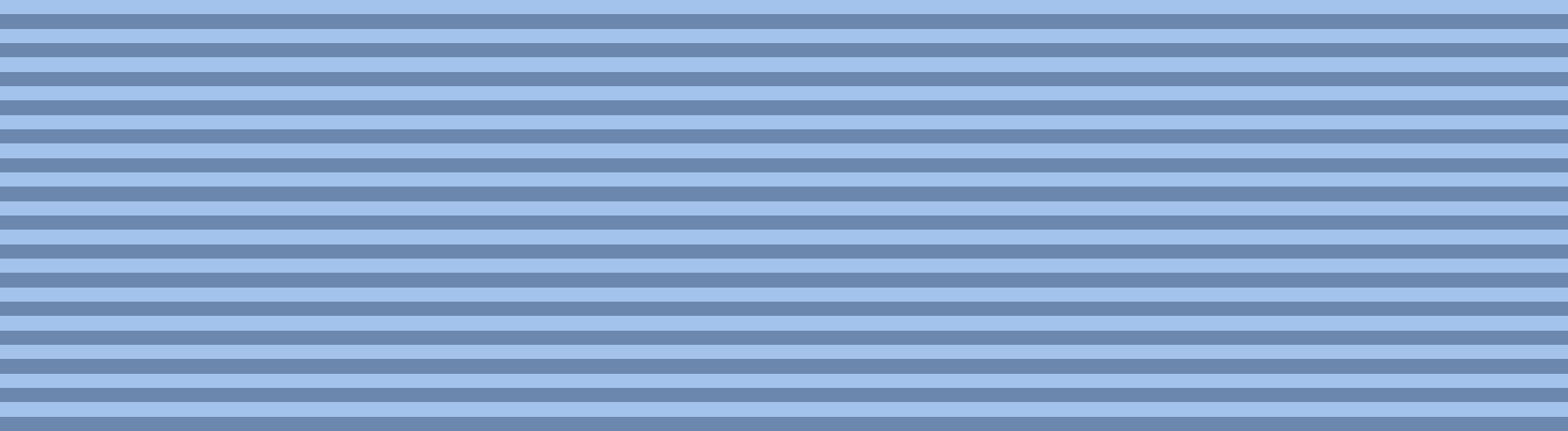
- Fifth Class of the Order of Prince Yaroslav the Wise (Ukraine, 2021)
- First Class of the Order of Merit (Ukraine, 2012)
- Third Class of the Order for Courage (Ukraine, 2006)
- Commander of the Order of the Star of Italian Solidarity (Italy, 2018)

== See also ==
- List of footballers with 100 or more UEFA Champions League appearances
- List of top international men's football goalscorers by country
- List of men's footballers with 100 or more international caps
