= Ayla Golf Club =

Golf club in n Aqaba, Jordan

Ayla Golf Club is a golf course located within the Ayla Oasis, a mixed-use real estate and tourism development in Aqaba, southern Jordan. The course covers approximately 800,000 m^{2} (8,600,000 sq ft) and includes an 18-hole championship course and a 9-hole academy course. The golf course was designed by Greg Norman through his company, Greg Norman Golf Course Design (GNGCD).

== Location ==
The golf club is located along the Red Sea coast in Aqaba, about 80 miles south of Petra. It is part of the Ayla Oasis mixed-use development, which includes residential, commercial, and recreational components.

== History ==
Construction of the golf course began as part of the first phase of the Ayla Oasis mixed-use project. The 18-hole championship course was designed by Greg Norman through his company Greg Norman Golf Course Design (GNGCD) and opened in 2016.

The clubhouse and golf academy were designed by Oppenheim Architecture, with Chad Oppenheim and Beat Huesler serving as principals in charge. The local architect on the project was Darb Architects and Engineers. The total built-up area of the complex is 5,800 square meters, comprising a 4,100-square-meter clubhouse, a 1,200-square-meter golf academy, and 500 square meters of comfort stations. The clubhouse was completed in 2018.

The construction involved a training programme between the European office of Oppenheim Architecture and the local workforce, through which workers were trained in shotcrete pouring techniques. A local artist applied a traditional pigmentation technique to the interior surfaces.

== Design and sustainability ==
The course was designed to follow the natural terrain. Artificial lagoons within the development supply water for irrigation and serve as habitats for local wildlife and migratory birds.

The club facilities were designed by Oppenheim Architecture, with elements reflecting the surrounding desert and coastal landscape. The buildings include ventilation channels, light filters, and patterns influenced by local architectural traditions.

== Facilities ==
The club features practice facilities, indoor swing and putting studios, PGA-certified instruction, and dining at Silica Restaurant.

== Sporting activities ==
The club operates in coordination with the Jordan Golf Federation, including training programs for youth and national teams.

== Jordan Mixed Open ==
The Jordan Mixed Open presented by Ayla was a professional golf tournament held at Ayla Golf Club in Aqaba, Jordan. The first edition took place in April 2019. The field included players from the Challenge Tour, European Senior Tour and Ladies European Tour, as well as three amateur players.

The tournament was played over 54 holes, with a cut after 36 holes. Daan Huizing won the 2019 tournament, finishing two strokes ahead of Meghan MacLaren. José Cóceres was the highest-placed player from the European Senior Tour, finishing tied for fourth.

Other regional and international tournaments hosted at the club include:

- Turkish Airlines World Golf Cup
- The Jordan Open Championship
- The Arab Amateur Open Championship
- MENA Tour events
- The Jordan Junior Golf League

== Awards ==
The club has received the following awards and certifications:

- 2020 – Rank #9 Golf Course in Middle East
- 2019–2020 – GEO Certified® Development (world)
- 2017 – Jury Winner – Unbuilt Sports & Recreation (region)
