= Kristen Pazik =

American model of Polish descent (born 1978)

- Born: 11 August 1977 (age 49); Minneapolis, Minnesota, U.S.
- Occupation: Model
- Spouse: Andriy Shevchenko (m. 2004)
- Children: 4
- Parent: Mike Pazik (father)

Kristen Pazik (born 11 August 1977) is an American and British model.

Pazik married Ukrainian footballer Andriy Shevchenko in July 2004. The couple have four sons, Jordan, Kristian, Olexandr and Rider. She, unlike her husband, who is Ukrainian Orthodox, is a Catholic.

Pazik is the daughter of former professional baseball player, Mike Pazik.
