= Jordan Mixed Open =

Coordinates: 29.5613°N 34.9918°E

Tournament information
- Location: Aqaba, Jordan
- Established: 2019
- Course: Ayla Golf Club
- Par: 72
- Length: 7,200 yards (6,600 m)
- Tours: Challenge Tour; European Senior Tour; Ladies European Tour
- Format: Stroke play
- Prize fund: US$393,000
- Month played: April
- Final year: 2019

Tournament record score
- Aggregate: 200 Daan Huizing (2019)
- To par: −16 as above

Final champion
- (Netherlands) Daan Huizing

Location map
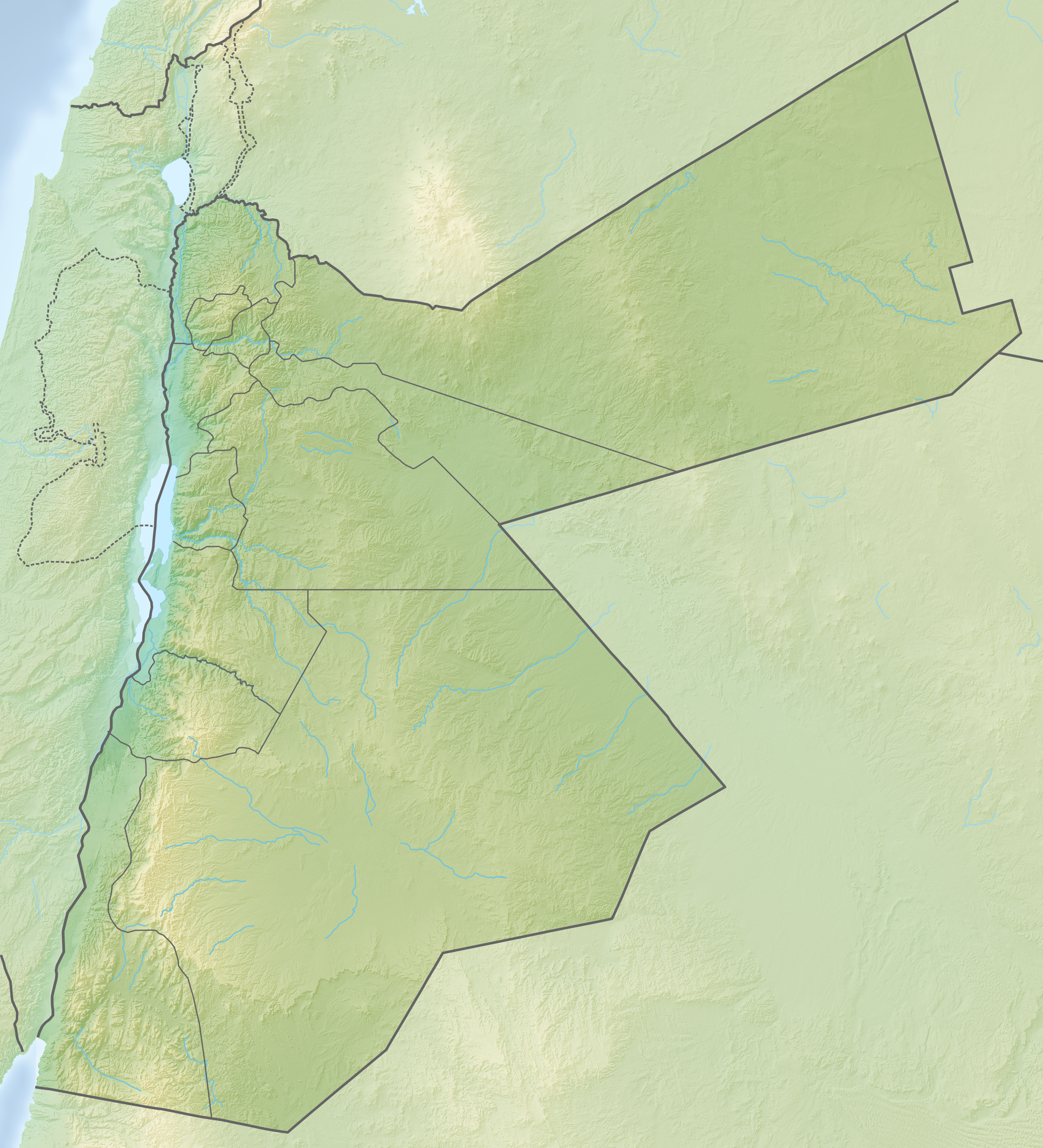
- Location in Jordan

The Jordan Mixed Open presented by Ayla is a professional golf tournament. The event included players from the Challenge Tour, the European Senior Tour and the Ladies European Tour. The event was first held in April 2019 at Ayla Golf Club, Aqaba, Jordan.

In 2019 there were 40 players from each of the Challenge Tour, the European Senior Tour and the Ladies European Tour together with three high-level amateur golfers. The tournament was over 54 holes with a cut after 36 holes after which the top 60 players and ties played the final round. Players from the three tours played to the same pins but from different tees. Challenge Tour players competed from approximately 7,100 yards, European Senior Tour players competed from approximately 6,601 yards, while Ladies European Tour players competed from approximately 6,139 yards. 66 players made the cut, 25 from the Challenge Tour, 21 from the European Senior Tour, 19 professionals from the Ladies European Tour and one of the three amateurs, Emilie Alba Paltrinieri. Daan Huizing, from the Challenge Tour, won the tournament, two strokes ahead of Meghan MacLaren. José Cóceres was the leading senior, finishing tied for 4th place.

== Winners ==
Year	Tours (Note: CHA − Challenge Tour; EST − European Senior Tour; LET − Ladies European Tour.)	Winner	Score	To par	Margin of victory	Runner-up
2019	CHA, EST, LET	(Netherlands) Daan Huizing	200	−16	2 strokes	(England) Meghan MacLaren

== See also ==
- Open golf tournament
