= 2004 Ballon d'Or =

Annual association football award event in France

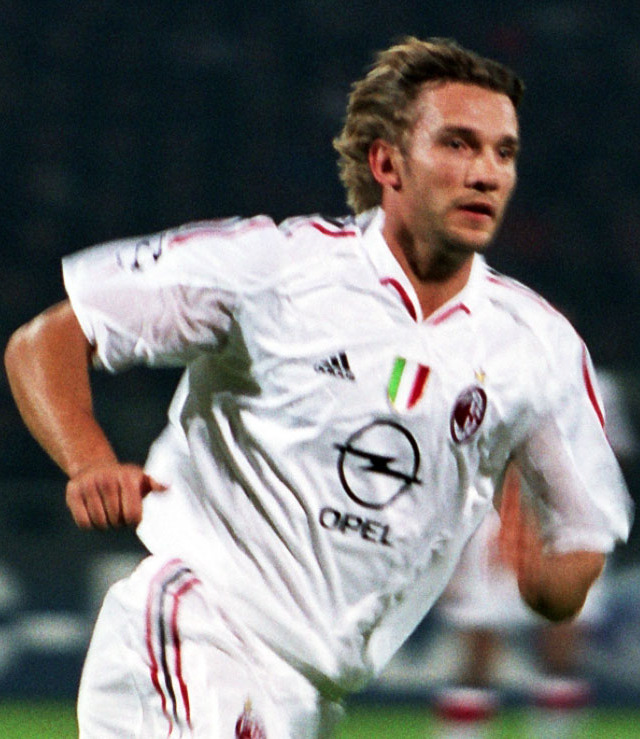
- 2004 Ballon d'Or winner, Andriy Shevchenko
- Date: 13 December 2004
- Presented by: France Football

Highlights
- Won by: (Ukraine) Andriy Shevchenko (1st title)
- Website: ballondor.com

The 2004 Ballon d'Or (lit. '2004 Golden Ball'), given to the best football player in Europe as judged by a panel of sports journalists from UEFA member countries, was delivered to the Ukrainian striker Andriy Shevchenko on 13 December 2004.

Andriy Shevchenko was the third Ukrainian to win the award after Oleh Blokhin (1975) and Igor Belanov (1986). He finished top goalscorer in the 2003–04 Serie A, scoring 24 goals in 32 matches, as his team won the league title. The best ranked goalkeeper on the list was Gianluigi Buffon (Italy) with a 17th place (jointly with Traianos Dellas, Fernando Morientes, Frank Lampard and Didier Drogba). Ricardo Carvalho (Portugal) was the top ranked defender in the list, at ninth, while Deco (Portugal) was the top ranked midfielder at second place.

== Rankings ==
On 9 November 2004, was announced the shortlist of 50 male players compiled by a group of experts from France Football.

There were 52 voters, from Albania, Andorra, Armenia, Austria, Azerbaijan, Belarus, Belgium, Bosnia-Herzegovina, Bulgaria, Croatia, Cyprus, Czech Republic, Denmark, England, Estonia, Faroe Islands, Finland, France, Georgia, Germany, Greece, Hungary, Iceland, Israel, Italy, Kazakhstan, Latvia, Liechtenstein, Lithuania, Luxembourg, Macedonia, Malta, Moldova, Netherlands, Northern Ireland, Norway, Poland, Portugal, Republic of Ireland, Romania, Russia, San Marino, Scotland, Slovakia, Slovenia, Spain, Sweden, Switzerland, Turkey, Ukraine, Wales and Yugoslavia. Each picked a first (5pts), second (4pts), third (3pts), fourth (2pts) and fifth choice (1pt).

=== Voted players ===
Rank	Player	Nationality	Club(s)	Total	Votes by place					Votes
Rank	Player	Nationality	Club(s)	Total	1st	2nd	3rd	4th	5th	Votes
1st	Andriy Shevchenko	Ukraine	(Italy) Milan	175	27	5	5	2	1	40
2nd	Deco	Portugal	(Portugal) Porto (Spain) Barcelona	139	10	13	9	4	2	38
3rd	Ronaldinho	Brazil	(Spain) Barcelona	133	9	13	7	4	7	40
4th	Thierry Henry	France	(England) Arsenal	80	3	6	6	10	3	28
5th	Theodoros Zagorakis	Greece	(Greece) AEK Athens (Italy) Bologna	44	3	2	3	3	6	17
6th	Adriano	Brazil	(Italy) Parma (Italy) Internazionale	27	-	3	2	2	5	12
7th	Pavel Nedvěd	Czech Republic	(Italy) Juventus	23	-	-	4	4	3	11
8th	Wayne Rooney	England	(England) Everton	22	-	1	3	2	5	11
9th	Ricardo Carvalho	Portugal	(Portugal) Porto (England) Chelsea	18	-	2	2	2	-	6
9th	Ruud van Nistelrooy	Netherlands	(England) Manchester United	18	-	-	4	2	2	8
11th	Angelos Charisteas	Greece	(Germany) Werder Bremen	15	-	1	1	2	4	8
12th	Cristiano Ronaldo	Portugal	(England) Manchester United	11	-	1	1	2	-	4
12th	Milan Baroš	Czech Republic	(England) Liverpool	11	-	1	-	3	1	5
14th	Zlatan Ibrahimović	Sweden	(Netherlands) Ajax (Italy) Juventus	8	-	-	-	3	2	5
15th	Samuel Eto'o	Cameroon	(Spain) Mallorca (Spain) Barcelona	7	-	1	1	-	-	2
15th	Kaká	Brazil	(Italy) Milan	7	-	1	-	1	1	3
17th	Traianos Dellas	Greece	(Italy) Roma	5	-	1	-	-	1	2
17th	Fernando Morientes	Spain	(France) Monaco (Spain) Real Madrid	5	-	1	-	-	1	2
17th	Frank Lampard	England	(England) Chelsea	5	-	-	1	1	-	2
17th	Didier Drogba	Ivory Coast	(France) Marseille (England) Chelsea	5	-	-	1	-	2	3
17th	Gianluigi Buffon	Italy	(Italy) Juventus	5	-	-	1	-	2	3
22nd	Luís Figo	Portugal	(Spain) Real Madrid	4	-	-	-	2	-	2
23rd	Zinedine Zidane	France	(Spain) Real Madrid	3	-	-	1	-	-	1
24th	Rubén Baraja	Spain	(Spain) Valencia	2	-	-	-	1	-	1
24th	Ludovic Giuly	France	(France) Monaco (Spain) Barcelona	2	-	-	-	1	-	1
24th	Maniche	Portugal	(Portugal) Porto	2	-	-	-	1	-	1
24th	Antonios Nikopolidis	Greece	(Greece) Panathinaikos (Greece) Olympiacos	2	-	-	-	-	2	2
28th	Paolo Maldini	Italy	(Italy) Milan	1	-	-	-	-	1	1
28th	Vicente	Spain	(Spain) Valencia	1	-	-	-	-	1	1

=== Non-voted players ===
The following 21 players were originally in contention for the 2004 Ballon d’Or, but did not receive any votes:

Player	Nationality	Club(s)
Aílton	Brazil	(Germany) Werder Bremen (Germany) Schalke 04
Roberto Ayala	Argentina	(Spain) Valencia
Fabien Barthez	France	(England) Manchester United (France) Marseille
David Beckham	England	(Spain) Real Madrid
Petr Čech	Czech Republic	(England) Chelsea
Emerson	Brazil	(Italy) Roma (Italy) Juventus
Juninho	Brazil	(France) Lyon
Michalis Kapsis	Greece	(Greece) AEK Athens (France) Bordeaux
Henrik Larsson	Sweden	(Scotland) Celtic (Spain) Barcelona
Johan Micoud	France	(Germany) Werder Bremen
Mista	Spain	(Spain) Valencia
Alessandro Nesta	Italy	(Italy) Milan
Andrea Pirlo	Italy	(Italy) Milan
José Antonio Reyes	Spain	(Spain) Sevilla (England) Arsenal
Ronaldo	Brazil	(Spain) Real Madrid
Djibril Cissé	France	(France) Auxerre (England) Liverpool
Paul Scholes	England	(England) Manchester United
Clarence Seedorf	Netherlands	(Italy) Milan
Giourkas Seitaridis	Greece	(Greece) Panathinaikos (Portugal) Porto
Francesco Totti	Italy	(Italy) Roma
Patrick Vieira	France	(England) Arsenal
