= Mike Pazik =

American baseball player (born 1950)

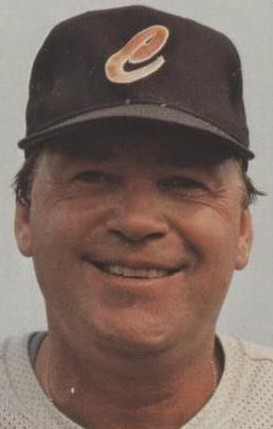
- Pazik as pitching coach with the Charlotte Knights in 1988
- Pitcher
- Born: January 26, 1950 (age 76); Lynn, Massachusetts, U.S.
- Batted: Left Threw: Left

MLB debut
- May 11, 1975, for the Minnesota Twins

Last MLB appearance
- April 22, 1977, for the Minnesota Twins

MLB statistics
- Win–loss record: 1–4
- Earned run average: 5.79
- Strikeouts: 20
- Stats at Baseball Reference

Teams
- Minnesota Twins (1975–1977)

Michael Joseph Pazik (/ˈpeɪzɪk/ PAY-zik; born January 26, 1950) is an American former professional baseball pitcher. He pitched parts of three seasons in Major League Baseball (MLB), from 1975 until 1977, for the Minnesota Twins.

== Amateur career ==
A native of Lynn, Massachusetts, Pazik graduated from Lynn English High School in 1968, and was selected by the Los Angeles Dodgers in the 4th round of the 1968 MLB draft. He opted to play college baseball at the College of the Holy Cross. In 1968 and 1969, Pazik played collegiate summer baseball with the Harwich Mariners of the Cape Cod Baseball League (CCBL) and was named a league all-star in 1969. He returned to the CCBL in 1970 and 1971 to play for the Orleans Cardinals, tossing a no-hitter in 1971.

== Professional career ==
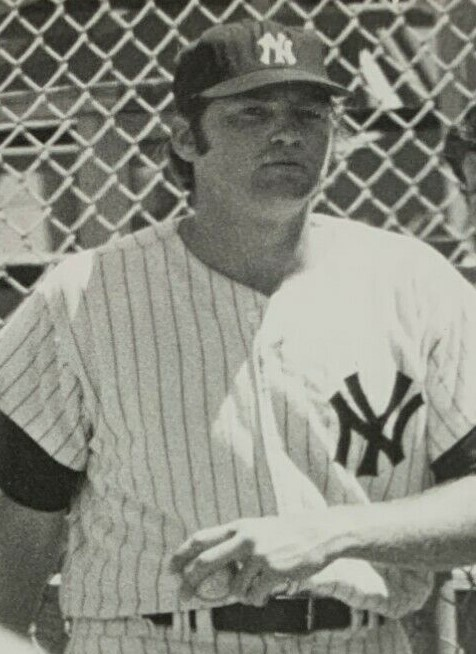
Pazik was drafted by the New York Yankees in 1971.

Pazik was selected by the New York Yankees in the first round of the 1971 MLB draft. He played for the Yankees' minor league affiliate Syracuse Chiefs for several seasons before being traded to the Minnesota Twins for Dick Woodson in 1974. He made his big league debut for Minnesota in 1975, appearing in 5 games (with an 0-4 record) in May and June of that year, before being sent back to the minors. He made the Twins opening day roster in 1976 but again was sent down after appearing in 5 games, all as a reliever (with no wins, no losses, and no saves).

Pazik again made the Twins opening day roster in 1977, and was placed in the starting rotation. He appeared in 3 games, including his first major league win on April 17, a 10-2 victory over the Oakland A's. On April 25, 1977, Pazik was a passenger in a van driven by Twins teammate Don Carrithers when, coming off Interstate 494 in Bloomington, MN, a young Ohio woman mistakenly got on the freeway via the exit ramp. Both men were seriously injured in the resulting crash, and while Carrithers was out of major league action until late July, Pazik suffered two broken legs and never pitched in the majors again. He pitched a total of 46.2 innings for the Twins over three seasons.

Pazik signed as a free agent with the Chicago White Sox in 1978, and played two seasons in Chicago's minor league system, but was not recalled to the majors.

== Coaching and scouting career ==
After his playing career, Pazik was a minor league coach and manager, including serving as the pitching coach for the Chicago White Sox from 1995 until 1998. He also served as a scout for Kansas City Royals during their 2015 World Series winning season.

== Personal life ==
Mike's daughter, Kristen Pazik, is a model who is married to Ukrainian former soccer player turned manager Andriy Shevchenko.
