= Kharkov Superior Cup =

Tournament information
- Location: Kharkiv, Ukraine
- Established: 2013
- Courses: Superior Golf & Spa Resort
- Par: 72
- Length: 6,892 yards (6,302 m)
- Tour: Challenge Tour
- Format: Stroke play
- Prize fund: €200,000
- Month played: September
- Final year: 2013

Tournament record score
- Aggregate: 273 Daan Huizing (2013)
- To par: −15 as above

Final champion
- (Netherlands) Daan Huizing
- Location in Ukraine

The Kharkov Superior Cup was a golf tournament on the Challenge Tour. It was played for the first time in September 2013 at the Superior Golf & Spa Resort in Kharkiv, Ukraine.

Daan Huizing won the inaugural event by two strokes over Sihwan Kim.

The 2014 event was not held for security reasons.

== Winners ==
Year	Winner	Score	To par	Margin of victory	Runner-up
2014	Cancelled due to security risks				
2013	(Netherlands) Daan Huizing	273	−15	2 strokes	(United States) Sihwan Kim
