= Sihwan Kim =

American professional golfer

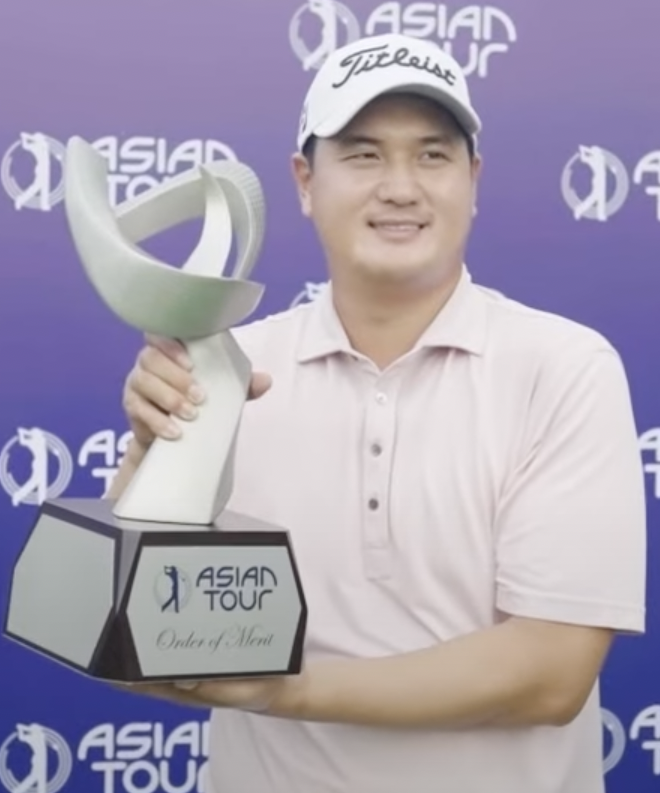
- Kim at the 2022 BNI Indonesian Masters

Personal information
- Nationality: United States
- Born: December 4, 1988 (age 37) Seoul, South Korea
- Height: 6 ft 1 in (1.85 m)
- Weight: 190 lb (86 kg; 14 st)

Career
- Sport: Golf
- College: Stanford University
- Turned professional: 2011
- Current tour: Asian Tour
- Former tours: European Tour; LIV Golf; Challenge Tour
- Professional wins: 2

Number of wins by tour
- Asian Tour: 2

Best results in major championships
- Masters Tournament: DNP
- PGA Championship: T62: 2023
- U.S. Open: DNP
- The Open Championship: CUT: 2022

Achievements and awards
- Pac-10 Freshman of the Year: 2008
- Asian Tour Order of Merit winner: 2022
- Asian Tour Players' Player of the Year: 2022

Sihwan Kim (born December 4, 1988) is an American professional golfer. He plays on the Asian Tour, where he has won two titles.

== Amateur career ==
Kim was born in Seoul, South Korea, and moved with his parents to California at a young age. He graduated from Sunny Hills High School in Fullerton, California where he was captain of the golf team. In 2004, he won the U.S. Junior Amateur at The Olympic Club, 1 up, over David Chung. He won the Mission Hills Desert Junior and the Rolex Tournament of Champions in 2007. He advanced to the round of 16 in the 2008 U.S. Amateur at Pinehurst and tied for sixth with a 11-under-par 269 at the Players Amateur.

Kim attended Stanford University and played college golf with the Stanford Cardinal men's golf team between 2007 and 2011, where he was named Pac-10 Freshman of the Year. He played in the Nationwide Children's Hospital Invitational on the 2008 Nationwide Tour and recorded the lowest finish out of all the amateurs, finishing in a tie for sixth place.

== Professional career ==
Kim turned professional in 2011 and joined the European Challenge Tour in 2012, where he was runner-up at the Rolex Trophy in Switzerland behind Kristoffer Broberg in his rookie season. In 2013, he was runner-up at the Le Vaudreuil Golf Challenge in France and the Kharkov Superior Cup in Ukraine. He finished 9th on the Order of Merit to graduate to the 2014 European Tour, where he recorded two top-10 finishes. Playing mainly on the Challenge Tour 2015–2017 his best finish was a tied second place at the 2017 Swedish Challenge behind Estanislao Goya of Argentina.

Kim started playing on the Asian Tour in late 2017 after finishing tied 8th at Q-School. In 2018, he finished 8th on the Order of Merit after recording a solo-second at the Yeangder Tournament Players Championship. In 2022, after several close calls, he won his first Asian Tour title at the International Series Thailand, a week after finishing tied-second at the Royal's Cup behind Chan Shih-chang. The next month, he won the Trust Golf Asian Mixed Stableford Challenge in Thailand, two points ahead of Maja Stark in second, after holing a 40-foot putt for eagle on the final hole. He finished the season 1st in the Asian Tour Order of Merit.

Kim joined LIV Golf in 2022 and finished in the top-24 to earn a guaranteed spot for 2023. In 2023, he finished 50th and last in the 2023 LIV Golf League and was relegated. He finished no higher than 33rd in any of the 13 individual events, and was last four times.

== Amateur wins ==
- 2004 U.S. Junior Amateur
- 2007 Mission Hills Desert Junior, Rolex Tournament of Champions, CordeValle Collegiate Classic

== Professional wins (2) ==
=== Asian Tour wins (2) ===
Legend
International Series (1)
Other Asian Tour (1)

No.	Date	Tournament	Winning score	Margin of victory	Runner-up
1	Mar 6, 2022	International Series Thailand	−26 (62-72-65-63=262)	2 strokes	(Thailand) Phachara Khongwatmai
2	Apr 17, 2022	Trust Golf Asian Mixed Stableford Challenge^{1}	49 pts (22-(2)-22-7=49)	2 points	(Sweden) Maja Stark

^{1}Mixed event with the Ladies European Tour

== Results in major championships ==
Tournament	2022	2023
Masters Tournament		
PGA Championship		T62
U.S. Open		
The Open Championship	CUT	

Did not play

CUT = missed the half-way cut

== See also ==
- 2013 Challenge Tour graduates
- 2019 European Tour Qualifying School graduates
