= FIFA World Ranking system (1999–2006) =

The 1999–2006 FIFA men's ranking system was a calculation technique previously used by FIFA for ranking men's national teams in association football. The ranking system was introduced by FIFA in 1999, as an update to an earlier system, and was replaced after the 2006 World Cup with a simplified system.

The rankings were fundamentally the same as a league system, though on a much larger, and more complex scale. Each team could potentially win a certain number of points in each match, though the number of points awarded in a league system depends solely on the result of the match, in the FIFA rankings far more had to be taken into account, as every team does not play all of the other teams home and away every season, as in most league systems. After the awarding of points, the teams were then organized into descending order by number of points, with the team with the most being the highest ranked.

The points allocated did not depend solely on whether a team wins, loses or draws their match, but also on the importance of the match and the strength of the opponent. A win over a weak opponent resulted in fewer points being awarded than a win over a much stronger one. This meant that a match would not result in the two or three points for a win and one for a draw, as is standard in most national league competitions. The calculation was more complex since it had to incorporate the other aforementioned factors.

One of the changes that was introduced when the ranking system was revised in 1999 was dubbed the "scaling up", where the points on offer for a match were roughly multiplied by ten, with the addition of more factors. In the 1999–2006 system teams could receive between zero and thirty points for a single match, and the leaders of the rankings had over eight hundred points.

== Overview ==
The rankings were intended by FIFA to give a fair ranking of all FIFA member associations' senior men's national teams. For the ranking all matches, their scores and importance were all recorded, and were used in the calculation procedure. Only matches for the senior men's national team were included – separate ranking systems were used for other representative national sides, such as the women's and junior teams, for example the FIFA Women's World Rankings. FIFA did not use the same formula to determine its rankings for women's football. The women's rankings were based on a procedure which was a simplified version of the Football Elo Ratings.

For the purposes of calculating the importance of matches, each match was divided into one of six categories. Competitions that were not endorsed by the appropriate continental association of FIFA were counted as friendlies. Each category was given appropriate weighting in the calculation in order to correctly include the importance. The six categories were:

- World Cup finals matches
- World Cup preliminary matches
- FIFA Confederations Cup matches
- Continental championships final matches
- Continental championship preliminary matches
- Friendly matches

A computer program was used to calculate the rankings. Points were awarded according to the following criteria:

- Winning, drawing and losing
- Importance of the match (multiplication factor)
- Regional strength (multiplication factor)

In order to try to remove the obvious advantage of having more matches, only the best seven matches each year were taken into account, as seven was the average number of matches a team played per year. Older matches were given diminishing importance within the calculation, in order to reward teams' most recent form, so the calculations only took into account teams' performances over the previous eight years.

At the end of each season two prizes were awarded by FIFA; Team of the Year and Best Mover of the year.

=== Winning, drawing or losing ===
In any football ranking system, a win will bring more points than a draw or a loss. Until July 2006, however, FIFA believed that awarding points simply on the basis of win, draw or loss, would not meet the requirements of a reliable and accurate world ranking system.

The calculations took into account the relative strengths of the two teams. This resulted in more points being awarded for beating a stronger opponent than for beating a relatively weak one. It also enabled weak teams to earn points despite a defeat if they managed to play well (i.e. they scored goals, or there was low margin of defeat), though this was a small number and did not secure as many points as the winning team. In the event of a match being decided on penalties, the winners received the correct points for the victory. The losers received points for the draw which they earned in normal time.

=== Number of goals ===
When calculating the points, the number of goals was taken into consideration, and the distribution of the points between the two teams was also affected by their relative strengths (i.e. the lower ranked a team was in comparison to its opponent, the more points it received for a goal scored), and as well as points being given for goals scored, they were deducted from the total for conceding goals. In order to encourage more attacking football, points given for goals scored were weighted far more heavily than the deduction as a result of conceding, though most teams were more concerned with the tournament or match at hand than their position in the world rankings. When a match was decided on penalties, only those goals scored in playing time were included in the total.

To prevent "overweighing" goals, and huge numbers of points being given in runaway victories, far more weighting was attached to the initial goal by each team, and progressively fewer points for any subsequent ones. This was done on the principle that the goals scored were important but the most important factor was the win or loss, as in normal championship games.

=== Home and away games ===
To allow for the extra handicap incurred by playing away from home, a small bonus of three points per match was awarded to the away team. For tournaments played on neutral territory, but with a home team, such a World Cup Finals, there were no bonus points given.

=== Status of a match ===
The relative game importance was also considered when calculating the points. The method for incorporating this into the totals points allocation was by multiplying the match points by a predetermined weighting. These factors were:

Factor	Weighting
Friendly match	x 1.00
Continental championship preliminary	x 1.50
World Cup preliminary match	x 2.50
Continental championship finals match	x 3.00
FIFA Confederations Cup match	x 3.00
World Cup finals match	x 4.00

=== Regional strength factors ===
Due to significant differences in national team strengths between continents, weighting factors were worked out each year for each confederation, based the member teams of the confederation's performances in intercontinental encounters and competitions. Not all intercontinental matches were taken into account, only matches between the strongest 25 percent of teams from each continent, with a minimum of five teams from each continent considered. This averted errors that could be caused by considering matches where relatively strong teams from one confederation defeated weak teams from another.

The weightings were applied in the form of multiplication factors for teams from the same continent. If teams from two different confederations were involved in one match then the factor applied was the average of the two continental weightings. For 2005, weighting factors ranged from 1.00 for UEFA teams to 0.93 for OFC teams.

== Summary ==
Based on the above considerations, the total number of points credited to a team after a match depended on the following criteria:

Where:

- w = Points for winning, drawing or losing
- g = Points for goals scored in the game
- c = Points for the goals conceded
- a = Bonus for the away team
- s = Appropriate factor for the status of the match
- r = Appropriate factor for regional strength
- m = Points Received

$(w+g+a-c)\ s\ r=m\,$

The number of points for a win, draw or loss, as well as for the number of goals scored or conceded was dependent on the strength of the opponent. In order not to punish a lack of success too severely, a negative points total was rounded up to zero.

These examples have also been used to demonstrate the Elo football ratings system for a fair comparison. Here are some calculation examples to show the formula being used. For simplicity in this instance it is assumed that three teams of different strengths are involved in a small friendly tournament on neutral territory.

Note:no away team bonus, nor continental or status multiplication factors are applied.

Before the tournament the three team have the following point totals:

Team	Points
A	630
B	500
C	480

As shown, team A is by some distance the highest ranked of the three: The following table shows the divisions of point allocations based on three possible outcomes of the match between the far stronger team A, and the somewhat weaker team B:

=== Example 1 ===
Team A versus Team B (Team A stronger than Team B)

	Team A	Team B	Team A	Team B	Team A	Team B
Score	3 : 1		1 : 3		2 : 2	
Points for Win/defeat	+17.4	+2.6	−2.6	+22.6	+7.4	+12.6
Points for Goals Scored	+5.4	+2.7	+2.3	+6.2	+4.1	+4.7
Points for Goals Conceded	−1.8	−3.6	−4.1	−1.6	−3.1	−2.7
Total	+21.0	+1.7	(0.00)	+27.2	+8.4	+14.6

As is shown on the table, in the case of a 3:1 win, team a receives an allocation of 21.0 points, however, since team A is a much higher ranked team, the win alone earns only 17.4 of the total points, and the much lower ranked team B still manages to earn 1.7 points. Had match been won 3:1 by the far weaker team B, they would have received 27.2 points, whilst team A would have received a negative total of points, which would then have been rounded up to 0.0. If the result had been a 2:2 draw, since it is the lower-rated team, B would have earned a few points more than team A.

=== Example 2 ===
Team B versus Team C (both teams approximately the same strength)

When the difference in strength between the two teams is less, so also the difference in points allocation will be fewer. The following table shows how the points would be divided following the same results as above, but with two roughly equally ranked teams, B and C, being involved:

	Team B	Team C	Team B	Team C	Team B	Team C
Score	3 : 1		1 : 3		2 : 2	
Points for Win/defeat	+19.4	+0.4	−0.4	+20.4	+9.6	+10.4
Points for Goals scored	+5.7	+2.5	+2.5	+5.8	+4.3	+4.4
Points for Goals conceded	−1.7	−3.8	−3.9	−1.7	−3.0	−2.9
Total	+23.6	(0.00)	(0.00)	+24.5	+10.9	+11.9

== Further criteria ==
To increase the level of accuracy and objectivity of the rankings, after the 1999 revision, further criteria were introduced. Firstly, the number of matches a team plays within a given period of time was taken into account. Secondly, the importance attached to previous results would be interpreted differently.

=== The number of matches played ===
In order to ensure that an increased number of fixtures in a given season did not give a team more potential points, the rankings only considered a limited number of results. This number was determined by deciding how many fixtures in a season an "averagely active team" would participate in. This was agreed to be between seven and ten matches a year.

In order to prevent teams with more fixtures than this being given an advantage, the calculation initially considered only the best seven results of a team. To include further results an average of them must be calculated.

For example, if a team played twelve matches:

- The best seven of the 12 results were identified
- The total score for these seven matches was calculated (X)
- The total score for all 12 matches was calculated
- This total was divided by 12 and multiplied by seven (Y)
- The total for the seven best results was added to the seven "average" results (X+Y)
- This total (X+Y) was divided by two for the final score

=== Previous results ===
In order to assure that the rankings best reflected a team's current form, the most recent results were of greatest importance; however attention was also paid to the results of previous years. The results from the preceding year were given full weighting, with the results from one to two years before given seven-eighths of their value, those from two to three years before given six-eighths, and so on until after eight years the results are dropped from calculation completely.

== See also ==
- FIFA World Rankings – overview of ranking systems and the ranking system used after July 2018
- FIFA Women's World Rankings – the ranking system used for women's national teams, similar to the Elo system
- World Football Elo Ratings – an alternative ranking system
