= FIFA World Ranking system (2006–2018) =

The 2006–2018 FIFA men's ranking system was a calculation technique previously used by FIFA for ranking men's national teams in football. The ranking system was introduced by FIFA after the 2006 FIFA World Cup, as an update to an earlier system, and was replaced after the 2018 World Cup with a revised Elo-based system.

The system, like the previous ones, is extremely similar to that of a league, though with changes made to ensure that it is still representative of the teams' performance despite playing differing numbers of matches per annum, and the differing strength of opposition that teams have to face. The factors taken into account are as follows:

- Match result
- Match status
- Opposition strength
- Regional strength

Teams' actual scores are a result of the average points gained over each calendar year; matches from the previous four years are considered, with more weight being given to recent ones.

== Origin ==
The new rankings were compiled in response to criticism from the media. Meetings were attended by FIFA staff and external experts and a large amount of research was conducted by this group, resulting in the new ranking system. The new system was confirmed in Leipzig on 7 December 2005 by a committee of FIFA executives. Notable changes include the dropping of the home or away advantage and number of goals from the calculation, and the simplification of many aspects of the system.

== International "A" matches ==
In October 2012, FIFA released a press circular defining what is considered to be an international "A" match.

For the purposes of the ranking, FIFA defines an international "A" match as a match between two FIFA members for which both members field their first representative team ("A" team).

The FIFA/Coca-Cola World Ranking is based on a list of all international "A" matches that are recognised by FIFA.

International "A" matches include matches played as part of the FIFA World Cup, FIFA World Cup qualifiers, FIFA Confederations Cup, continental final tournaments, continental qualifying competitions and international friendlies.

— Jérôme Valcke, FIFA.com

== Win, draw or defeat ==
In previous years a complicated system of points allocation was used, depending on how strong the opponent was, and how large the loss margin, which allowed weaker losing teams to gain points when playing a much stronger opposition, if they managed to put up a decent match. With the new system, the points allocation is simpler: three points for a win, one point for a draw, and zero points for a loss, in line with most league systems around the world.

In the event of a match being decided by a penalty shootout, the winning team receives two points, and the losing team one point.

Result	Points
Win in regulation	3
Win by penalty shootout	2
Draw (includes loss by penalty shootout)	1
Loss in regulation	0

Until November 2012, in two-legged play-offs, if Team A lost the first leg 2 – 0, then matched the result in the return leg and won after a penalty shootout, it received two points. However, if Team A won the return leg by one goal only, being eliminated in the process, it received 3 points. FIFA fixed this flaw starting with the November 2012 ranking.

== Match status ==
Different matches have different importance to teams, and FIFA has tried to respect this by using a weighting system, where the most significant matches are in the World Cup finals, and the lowest weighted are friendly matches. FIFA states that it wishes to recognise that friendlies are still important, since they make up half of the competitive matches counted in the rankings. FIFA also stated, however, that it did not plan to make any adjustment for teams that qualify directly for major tournaments.

The match status multipliers are as follows:

Match status	Multipliers
FIFA World Cup and Continental cup qualifiers	× 2.5
Friendly match	× 1.0
World Cup finals match	× 4.0
Continental cup and Confederations Cup finals	× 3.0

== Opponent strength ==
A win against a very highly ranked opponent is a considerably greater achievement than a win against a low-rated opponent, thus the strength of the opposing team is an important factor.

The new system uses an opposition strength factor based on team rankings. The previous system was based on points difference.

The formula used is:

$$\text{Opposition strength multiplier} = ({200-\text{ranking position})/100}$$

with the exceptions that the team ranked #1 is given a multiplier of 2, and teams ranked 150th and below are assigned the minimum multiplier of 0.5.

The ranking position is taken from the opposition's ranking in the most recently published FIFA World Ranking before the match is included in the ranking calculation.

The rankings published before July 2006 are purely historical and are not used for the new ranking calculation. Instead, FIFA went back as far as 1996 to apply the new formula and is using those new rankings for the current calculations.

See the detailed break-down of point totals for teams from the top 20 in the October 2007 rankings.

== Regional strength ==
In addition to the opposition strength multiplier, FIFA considers the relative strength of entire confederations in the calculation. Each confederation is assigned a weighting between 0.85 and 1.0, based on the relative performance of the confederations in the last three World Cups. Their values are as follows:

Confederations	After 2006 World Cup	After 2010 World Cup	After 2014 World Cup	Up to and including 2006 World Cup
CONMEBOL (South America)	0.98	1.00	1.00	1.00
UEFA (Europe)	1.00	1.00	0.99	1.00
CONCACAF (North and Central America and Caribbean)	0.85	0.88	0.85	0.88
AFC (Asia)	0.85	0.86	0.85	0.85
CAF (Africa)	0.85	0.86	0.85	0.85
OFC (Oceania)	0.85	0.85	0.85	0.85

The multiplier used in the calculation is the average of the regional strength weighting of the two teams:

$$\text{Regional strength multiplier} = \frac{\text{Team 1 regional weighting} + \text{Team 2 regional weighting}}{2}$$

FIFA changed the formula used to compute the confederation weightings after the 2010 FIFA World Cup without public announcement. Without this modification, UEFA's multiplier would have dropped for the first time below 1, with CONMEBOL remaining the only confederation with a multiplier of 1.

The confederation weighting for AFC was increased in August 2011 from 0.85 to 0.86 after a computer programmer found an error in FIFA's calculations.

== Assessment period ==
Matches played over the last four years (48 months) are included in the calculation, but there is a weighting to put more emphasis on recent results. Previously an eight-year period was used. The date weighting is as follows:

Date of the matches	Multipliers
Within the last 12 months	× 1.0
12–24 months ago	× 0.5
24–36 months ago	× 0.3
36–48 months ago	× 0.2

If a team exceeds the assessment period without playing a match, it is temporarily removed from the rankings, and is reinstated as soon as it plays a match again. The most recent team to be temporarily absent from the rankings is São Tomé and Príncipe (reinstated in November 2011, after having been removed in December 2007).

== Ranking formula ==
The final ranking points figure for a single match is multiplied by 100 and rounded to the nearest whole number.

$$\text{Ranking points} = \text{Result points} \times \text{Match status} \times \text{Opposition strength} \times \text{Regional strength}$$

Results for all matches played in the year are averaged together (assuming at least five matches have been played). The average ranking points for the four previous years, weighted by their multiplier mentioned above, are added together to arrive at the final ranking points.

== Examples ==
The following examples use these hypothetical teams and confederations, and assume the games are played within the last 12 months:

- Amplistan is currently ranked 2nd in the world and is a member of confederation XYZ (weighting 1.0);
- Bestrudia is currently ranked 188th in the world and is a member of confederation ABC (weighting 0.88);
- Conesto is currently ranked 39th in the world and is a member of confederation QRS (weighting 0.98);
- Delphiz is currently ranked 30th in the world and is a member of confederation HIJ (weighting 0.94).

A friendly match is played between Amplistan and Bestrudia. Amplistan wins 2–1.

Match	Team	Result points	Match status	Opposition strength	Regional strength	Ranking points
Amplistan vs. Bestrudia (friendly); Result: 2–1	Amplistan; Bestrudia	3; 0	1.0; 1.0	0.50; 1.98	0.94; 0.94	141; 0

Bestrudia gets no ranking points because it lost the game, so all factors are multiplied by zero.

Amplistan's 141 ranking points are calculated like this:

- 3 points for the win;
- multiplied by 1.0 for match status (friendly match);
- multiplied by 0.50 for opposition strength (Bestrudia is ranked 188th, so it has the minimum 0.50 weighting);
- multiplied by 0.94 for regional strength (the average of the weightings for the two teams' confederations);
- multiplied by 100.

More examples:

Match	Team	Result points	Match status	Opposition strength	Regional strength	Ranking points
Amplistan vs. Bestrudia (friendly); Result: 1–2	Amplistan; Bestrudia	0; 3	1.0; 1.0	0.50; 1.98	0.94; 0.94	0; 558
Amplistan vs. Bestrudia (friendly); Result: 1–1	Amplistan; Bestrudia	1; 1	1.0; 1.0	0.50; 1.98	0.94; 0.94	47; 186
Amplistan vs. Bestrudia (World Cup finals); Result: 2–1	Amplistan; Bestrudia	3; 0	4.0; 4.0	0.50; 1.98	0.94; 0.94	564; 0
Amplistan vs. Bestrudia (World Cup finals); Result: 1–1 (Bestrudia wins on penalties)	Amplistan; Bestrudia	1; 2	4.0; 4.0	0.50; 1.98	0.94; 0.94	188; 1488
Amplistan vs. Conesto (friendly); Result: 1–2	Amplistan; Conesto	0; 3	1.0; 1.0	1.61; 1.98	0.99; 0.99	0; 588
Conesto vs. Delphiz (Continental cup qualifiers); Result: 4–0	Conesto; Delphiz	3; 0	2.5; 2.5	1.70; 1.61	0.96; 0.96	1224; 0
Conesto vs. Delphiz (Continental cup qualifiers); Result: 0–1	Conesto; Delphiz	0; 3	2.5; 2.5	1.70; 1.61	0.96; 0.96	0; 1159
Conesto vs. Amplistan (World Cup finals); Result: 0–0 (Amplistan wins on penalties)	Conesto; Amplistan	1; 2	4.0; 4.0	1.98; 1.61	0.99; 0.99	784; 1275

Conesto gets more points than Bestrudia for defeating the same team (Amplistan) because of the higher weighting of its confederation.

== See also ==
- FIFA World Rankings – overview of ranking systems and the ranking system used after July 2018
- FIFA Women's World Rankings – the ranking system used for women's national teams, similar to the Elo system
- World Football Elo Ratings – an alternative ranking system
