= Football ranking =

Football ranking can refer to

- FIFA World Rankings
- UEFA Rankings
- World Football Elo Ratings
