= FIFA Men's World Ranking =

World ranking list

Top 20 rankings as of 18 November 2026
Rank	Change	Team	Points
1	Steady	Spain	2004.48
2	Steady	Argentina	1966.13
3	Steady	France	1950.82
4	Steady	England	1938.9
5	▲2	Morocco	1809.37
6	▼1	Portugal	1801.28
7	▼1	Brazil	1800.91
8	Steady	Belgium	1790.37
9	Steady	Netherlands	1774.06
10	▲1	Colombia	1735.9
11	▲2	Germany	1730.22
12	▲2	Switzerland	1726.15
13	▼3	Mexico	1723.64
14	▲1	Italy	1717.2
15	▼1	Croatia	1714.22
16	Steady	United States	1713.56
17	Steady	Japan	1684.61
18	Steady	Senegal	1655.34
19	Steady	Norway	1650.89
20	Steady	Uruguay	1644.48
*Change from 7 October 2026
*Next update on 16 December 2026
Complete rankings at FIFA.com

The FIFA Men's World Ranking (also referred to as the FIFA/Coca-Cola World Ranking for sponsorship purposes) is a ranking system for men's national teams in association football, first introduced in December 1992. The men's teams of the member nations of FIFA, football's world governing body, are ranked based on their game results with the most successful teams being ranked the highest. As of November 2026, the rankings were led by Spain. Eight teams (Argentina, Belgium, Brazil, France, Germany, Italy, the Netherlands, and Spain) have held the top position, of which Brazil have spent the longest time ranked first.

A points system is used, with points being awarded based on the results of all FIFA-recognised full international matches. The ranking system has been revamped on several occasions, generally responding to criticism that the preceding calculation method did not effectively reflect the relative strengths of the national teams. Since 16 August 2018, the ranking system has adopted the Elo rating system used in chess and Go.

== Calculation method ==
The current calculation method has been in use since August 2018, having been introduced in the ranking release after the 2018 FIFA World Cup. The formula is based on the Elo rating system and after each game points are added to or subtracted from a team's rating according to the formula:

$$P = P_\text{before}+I(W-W_e)$$

where:

- P_{before} – the team's number of points before the game
- I – the importance coefficient:
  - 5 – friendlies played outside the International Match Calendar windows
  - 10 – friendlies played within the International Match Calendar windows
  - 15 – Nations League matches (group stage)
  - 25 – Nations League matches (play-offs and finals), Confederations' final competitions qualifiers, FIFA World Cup qualifiers
  - 35 – Confederations' final competitions matches (before quarter-finals)
  - 40 – Confederations' final competitions matches (quarter-finals, semi-finals, third place play-off and final)
  - 50 – FIFA World Cup matches (before quarter-finals)
  - 60 – FIFA World Cup matches (quarter-finals, semi-finals, third place play-off and final)
- W – the result of the game:
  - 0 – loss after regular or extra time
  - 0.5 – draw or loss in a penalty shoot-out
  - 0.75 – win in a penalty shoot-out
  - 1 – win after regular or extra time.

If a game ends with a winner, but still requires a penalty shoot-out (PSO) (i.e. in the second game of a two-legged tie), it is considered as a regular game and the PSO is disregarded.

- W_{e} – the expected result of the game:

$$W_e = \frac{1}{10^{-\frac{\Delta}{c}} + 1}$$

where $\Delta$ is the difference between two teams' ratings before the game, and $c=600$ is a scale.

Teams' ratings are not reduced by losses in the knockout stages of final competitions. Since the April 2021 rankings, the teams' points are rounded to two decimal places, instead of being rounded to the nearest integer.

=== Transition ===
The current ranking system represented a major change from the previous versions. Its introduction began with a review that was announced by FIFA in September 2017, with a view to a decision on whether to make changes after the end of the 2018 FIFA World Cup qualification. FIFA announced on 10 June 2018 that the ranking system would be updated following the 2018 World Cup finals. The most significant change was to move away from a system in which points were accrued for victories or draws and then dropped after a certain date (as used in systems such as the ATP and WTA rankings in tennis), to a continuous rating system in which teams' points increase or decrease with the result of every match. In addition to this, the current calculation method abolishes the weightings designated for FIFA's continental confederations and retained the 2006 changes which ascribed no value to whether a game was home or away, or to the margin of the victory, unlike several unofficial Elo-based ranking systems.

FIFA had intended to introduce the new ranking system in July 2018 immediately after the FIFA World Cup, but with no matches scheduled between the July and August ranking dates, this was delayed until August 2018. There was speculation from football journalists such as ESPN's Dale Johnson that this was because projections of the new rankings had seen relatively little change in positions, with Germany – who had been eliminated in the first round of the World Cup – remaining as the top ranked team.

FIFA had originally planned to use the pre-existing world ranking points from June 2018 as the start value, but by the time of the rankings' release in August 2018, the starting points had been changed. The numbers entered into the calculations for the August 2018 ranking had an equal distribution of points between 1600 (Germany, as the previously top ranked team) and 868 (Anguilla, Bahamas, Eritrea, Somalia, Tonga and Turks and Caicos Islands, which had 0 points in June), according to the formula:

$$P_\text{seeding}=1600-(R-1)\times 4$$,

where R is the rank in June 2018. When two or more teams had equal ranks, the following team received the next immediate rank possible, e.g. if two teams had R=11, the following team had R=12, not 13. These numbers were then used to calculate new rankings, based on games played since June 2018. This produced a more dramatically altered ranking table, with Germany falling to 15th and 2018 World Cup champions France moving to the top of the ranking.

=== Analysis of model properties ===
A 2022 analysis of the ranking argued that the 2018 system is a clear improvement over the previous FIFA rankings. This analysis noted that, unlike a pure Elo rating which are a zero-sum game where the total number of ranking points stays constant, the FIFA rankings will slowly inflate the number of points. This inflation is caused by:

- Penalty shootouts, when $W_\text{winner}= 0.75$ and $W_\text{loser} = 0.5$, thus $W_\text{winner} + W_\text{loser} = 1.25$,
- The knockout stages of competitions, where $W-W_e$ in the ranking formula is forced to be non-negative. Most often, this rule is applied for the losing team, but is also done for the winner in shootouts when $W_e>0.75$.

As a consequence, the total number of points slowly grows over time; between June 4, 2018 and March 31, 2022, there were 3,444 FIFA-recognized games, and the initial total value of points equal to 254,680 was increased by 2,099 points (approximately 0.8%). The 2022 analysis also attempted to assess the ranking's predictive value and found that, as with other Elo rating systems, it is possible to infer an implicit probabilistic model used by the algorithm. The 2018 ranking system offers improved predictive value over the previous FIFA rankings, but would be higher if it incorporated home field advantage and if the importance coefficient $I$, were removed.

=== Historical calculation methods ===
In December 1992, FIFA first published a listing in rank order of its men's member associations to provide a basis for comparison of the relative strengths of these teams. From the following August, this list was more frequently updated, to be published most months. Significant changes were implemented in January 1999 and again in July 2006, as a reaction to criticisms of the system. Historical records of the rankings, such as listed at FIFA.com, reflect the method of calculation in use at the time, as the current method has not been applied retrospectively to rankings before July 2006. Membership of FIFA has expanded from 167 to 211 since the rankings began; 211 members are currently included in the rankings. The Cook Islands were temporarily removed from the ranking in the period from September 2019 until February 2022, after not having played any matches between 4 September 2015 until 17 March 2022.

==== 1992–1998 calculation method ====
The ranking formula used from December 1992 until December 1998, was devised by two Swiss lecturers from Zurich University (Markus Lamprecht and Dr. Hanspeter Stam). The first formula was the most simple one, compared to later revisions, but it still required complex calculation. The main concept was to award points for matches played between all FIFA-affiliated national A teams, based on their results over the past eight years in FIFA-recognised matches (friendly matches, qualifying and finals matches for the World Cup, and qualifying and final matches for a Continental championship): Three points for a win, one point for a draw and no points for a loss. Results were not included from matches played by the FIFA association's: B teams, C teams, League XI teams, Women, U17, U20, U23 and futsal teams. The calculation formula was adjusted by the following factors:

1. Points for winning, drawing or losing: Compensatory factors for the relative strength of the two teams involved are included, so that a victory of a lower-ranked team over a higher-ranked team is awarded a higher number of winning-points compared to a victory of a higher-ranked team over a lower-ranked team. Likewise the points from a draw will be higher for the lower-ranked team compared to the higher-ranked team.
2. Points for goals scored or conceded: Goals are granted the same number of points whether or not they were scored in ordinary time or extended time. Zero points were granted from goals scored or conceded in a penalty shoot-out. Goals scored by a higher-ranked team against a lower-ranked team was also given slightly fewer points, compared to goals scored by a lower-ranked team against a higher-ranked team. Moreover, it was decided that the first goal scored by a team would be awarded more points compared to the subsequently scored goals in the same match. The total number of points from goals being scored or conceded, would be of such small scale, that the points awarded from the match result (winning/drawing) would always be of a higher value.
3. Bonus points for away matches: Regardless of the final match result, the away team is given 0.3 extra points for playing a match away from home. There will be no away bonus points for the teams, if the match is played on neutral grounds.
4. Multiplying factors for various competitions: The importance of the match will affect the points awarded to the teams, so that the sum of points granted through the first three rules mentioned above, will be multiplied by the following factors:
  1. Friendly matches: × 1.00
  2. Qualifier for Continental championship: × 1.10
  3. Qualifier for World Cup: × 1.25
  4. Finals of Continental championship: × 1.25
  5. Finals of World Cup: × 1.50
5. Regional strengths and weaknesses: Regional strength is finally also factored into the award of points. In matches between teams from different continents, the granted points are multiplied by a factor of 1.0. In matches between teams from the same continent, the granted points will be multiplied by a factor of: 1.0 for European and South American teams, 0.9 for African and North+Central American teams, 0.8 for Asian & Oceanian teams.
6. Overall resulting in this FIFA Rank calculation formula: (Sum of points from rule 1+2+3) * Rule4 Factor * Rule5 Factor, calculated for each recognized match played in the past eight years, with the total number of ranking points being the sum of points calculated for those matches.

In example, despite being undefeated for all matches played in 1994, the world ranking of England still dropped seven places from December 1993 to December 1994, because the team only scored points from six lower factored friendly games (as per rule 4). England did not play a single competitive match in 1994, because they had failed to qualify for the 1994 FIFA World Cup and neither played qualifiers for the UEFA Euro 1996 as an automatically qualified host. The calculated results for the rankings published throughout 1992–1998, was at some point of time also rounded to the nearest integer by the official FIFA website, although other websites opted to publish the unrounded points of the ranking.

==== 1999–2006 calculation method ====
In January 1999, FIFA introduced a revised system of ranking calculation, incorporating many changes in response to criticism of inappropriate rankings. For the ranking all matches, their scores and importance were all recorded, and were used in the calculation procedure. Only matches for the senior men's national team were included. Separate ranking systems were used for other representative national sides such as women's and junior teams, for example the FIFA Women's World Rankings. The women's rankings were, and still are, based on a procedure which is a simplified version of the Football Elo Ratings. The major changes were as follows:

- the point ranking was scaled up by a factor of ten
- the method of calculation was changed to take into account factors including:
  - the number of goals scored or conceded
  - whether the match was played at home or away
  - the importance of a match or competition
  - regional strength
- a fixed number of points were no longer necessarily awarded for a victory or a draw
- match losers were able to earn points

A contemporary website, described the 1999-revision of the calculation formula to be something that "slightly modified and more finely tuned the tried and tested method of calculation", with the most impactful revisions being that from now on only the seven best matches annually are taken into account (removing the previous advantage of playing additional matches) along with an adjustment of the regional strength factors for confederations and the match importance factors for various competitions. The new ranking system continued the practice of the previous one, to annually grant the awards:

- Team of the Year
- Best Mover of the Year

The changes made the ranking system more complex, but helped improve its accuracy by making it more comprehensive.

==== 2006–2018 calculation method ====
FIFA announced that the ranking system would be updated following the 2006 World Cup. The evaluation period was cut from eight to four years, and a simpler method of calculation was used to determine rankings. Goals scored and home or away advantage were no longer taken into account, and other aspects of the calculations, including the importance attributed to different types of match, were revised. The first set of revised rankings and the calculation methodology were announced on 12 July 2006. This change was rooted at least in part in widespread criticism of the previous ranking system. Many football enthusiasts felt it was inaccurate, especially when compared to other ranking systems and that it was not sufficiently responsive to changes in the performance of individual teams.

==== Criticism of pre–2018 methods ====
Since their introduction in 1992, the FIFA World Rankings have been the subject of much debate, particularly regarding the calculation procedure and the resulting disparity between generally perceived quality and world ranking of some teams. The perceived flaws in the FIFA system have led to the creation of a number of alternative rankings from football statisticians.

The initial system was very simple, with no weighting for the quality of opponent or importance of a match. This saw Norway reach second in October 1993 and July–August 1995, a ranking that was criticised at the time. The rankings were adapted in 1999 to include weightings based on the importance of the match and the strength of the opponent. A win over a weak opponent resulted in fewer points being awarded than a win over a much stronger one. Further adaptations in 2006 were made to reduce the number of years' results considered from 8 to 4, with greater reliance on matches from within the previous 12 months. Still, criticisms of the rankings remained, with particular anomalies being noted including: the United States rise to fourth in 2006, to the surprise of even their own players; Israel's climb to 15th in November 2008, which surprised the Israeli press; and Belgium's rank of world number 1 in November 2015, even though Belgium had only played in one tournament final stage in the past 13 years.

Further criticisms of the 2006–2018 formula included the inability of hosts of major tournaments to retain a high place in the rankings, as the team participated in only lower-value friendly matches due to their automatic qualification for the tournament. For example, 2014 FIFA World Cup hosts Brazil fell to a record low ranking of 22nd in the world before that tournament, at which they then finished fourth. 2018 FIFA World Cup hosts Russia had the lowest ranking (70th) at the tournament, where they reached the quarter-finals before bowing out to eventual finalists Croatia on penalties.

In the 2010s, teams realised the ranking system could be 'gamed', specifically by avoiding playing non-competitive matches, particularly against weaker opponents. This was because the low weighting of friendlies meant that even victories could reduce a team's average score: in other words, a team could win a match and lose points. Before the seeding of the 2018 World Cup preliminary draw, Romania even appointed a ranking consultant, playing only one friendly in the year before the draw. Similar accusations had been made against Switzerland, who were a seeded team at the 2014 FIFA World Cup having played only three friendly matches in the previous year, and Poland before the 2018 FIFA World Cup. The use of regional strength multiplier in the ranking formula before 2018 was also accused of further reinforcing and perpetuating the bias for and against certain regions.

== Leaders ==
FIFA World Men's Ranking Leaders

Brazil (5,070 days)
**Spain (2,276 days)**
Argentina (1,704 days)
Belgium (1,442 days) (Note: Belgium and France jointly led for 35 days.)
Germany (1,148 days)
France (554 days)
Italy (188 days)
Netherlands (28 days)

Current holder shown in **bold**

When the system was introduced, Germany debuted as the top-ranked team following their extended period of dominance in which they had reached the three previous FIFA World Cup finals, winning one of them. Brazil took the lead in the run up to the 1994 FIFA World Cup after winning eight and losing only one of nine qualification matches, while on the way scoring twenty goals and conceding just four. Italy then led for a short time on the back of their own equally successful World Cup qualifying campaign, after which the top place was re-claimed by Germany.

Brazil's success in their lengthy qualifying campaign returned them to the lead for a brief period. Germany led again during the 1994 World Cup, until Brazil's victory in that competition gave them a large lead that would stand up for nearly seven years, until they were surpassed by a strong France team that captured both the 1998 FIFA World Cup and the 2000 European Football Championship.

Success at the 2002 FIFA World Cup restored Brazil to the top position, where they remained until February 2007, when Italy returned to the top for the first time since 1993 following their 2006 FIFA World Cup win in Germany. Just one month later, Argentina replaced them, reaching the top for the first time, but Italy regained its place in April. After winning the Copa América 2007 in July, Brazil returned to the top, but were replaced by Italy in September and then Argentina in October.

In July 2008, Spain took over the lead for the first time, having won UEFA Euro 2008. Brazil began a sixth stint at the top of the rankings in July 2009 after winning the 2009 Confederations Cup, and Spain regained the title in November 2009 after winning every match in qualification for the 2010 FIFA World Cup. In April 2010, Brazil returned to the top of the table. After winning the 2010 World Cup, Spain regained the top position and held it until August 2011, when the Netherlands reached the top spot for the first time, only to relinquish it the following month.

In July 2014, Germany took over the lead once again, having won the 2014 FIFA World Cup. In July 2015, Argentina reached the top spot for the first time since 2008, after reaching the final of both the 2014 FIFA World Cup and the 2015 Copa America. In November 2015, Belgium became the leader in the FIFA rankings for the first time, after topping their Euro 2016 qualifying group. Belgium led the rankings until April 2016, when Argentina returned to the top. In April 2017, Brazil returned to the No. 1 spot for the first time since 2010, with Germany regaining the top spot in July after winning the Confederations Cup.

In August 2018, FIFA updated their rating system by adopting the Elo rating system, with 2018 FIFA World Cup winners France regaining the top spot for the first time after nearly 16 years. One month later, for the first time, two teams were joint leaders as Belgium reached the same ranking as France. This lasted only one month, as Belgium regained sole possession of the top spot in October 2018 and kept it for nearly four years (only Brazil and Spain have had longer continuous streaks).

Argentina held the top spot for two and a half years after winning the 2022 FIFA World Cup, ending when Spain overtook them in September 2025. After a brief hiatus, Spain returned to the top in the World Ranking after winning the 2026 FIFA World Cup final.

== Schedule ==
Rankings are published multiple times a year. The most recent update was on 18 November 2026. The next update is scheduled for 16 December 2026. Since 2026, FIFA also releases a 'live ranking' during tournaments and after friendly matches, for comparative purposes only.

== Use of the rankings ==
The rankings are used by FIFA to rank the progression and ability of the national football teams of its member nations, and claims that they create "a reliable measure for comparing national A-teams". They are used as part of the calculation, or the entire grounds to seed competitions. In the 2010 FIFA World Cup qualification tournament, the rankings were used to seed the groups in the competitions involving CONCACAF members (using the May rankings), CAF (with the July set of data), and UEFA, using the specially postponed November 2007 ranking positions. The October 2009 ranking was used to determine the seeds for the 2010 FIFA World Cup final draw. The March 2011 ranking was used to seed the draw for the 2012 CAF Men's Pre-Olympic Tournament second qualifying round. The rankings are also used to determine the winners of the two annual awards national teams receive on the basis of their performance in the rankings. The Football Association uses the average of the last 24 months of rankings as one of the criteria for player work permits.

=== Special releases ===
To determine the seeding of teams in certain instances like FIFA World Cup qualification, FIFA occasionally releases a list of special rankings for a particular confederation to determine the seeding of the teams. For instance, the seeding for the third round draw for AFC qualifiers was based on a special release of the FIFA World Rankings for Asian teams on 18 June 2021.

== Awards ==
Each year FIFA hands out two major awards to its member nations, based on their rankings.

=== Team of the Year ===
The Team of the Year is awarded each year to the first ranked team in the December edition of the FIFA World Ranking. (Note: With an exception for 2000 and 2001, where the calculation method was based on the national team with the highest average points score in their seven best matches of that calendar year.) Spain are the most recent winners of the award, for the seventh time in the 33-year history of the rankings. Brazil hold the records for the most consecutive wins (seven, between 1994 and 2000) and most wins overall (thirteen). The table shows the three best teams of each year.

Year	First place	Second place	Third place
1993	Germany	Italy	Brazil
1994	Brazil	Spain	Sweden
1995	Brazil	Germany	Italy
1996	Brazil	Germany	France
1997	Brazil	Germany	Czech Republic
1998	Brazil	France	Germany
1999	Brazil	Czech Republic	France
2000	Brazil	France	Argentina
2001	France	Argentina	Brazil
2002	Brazil	France	Spain
2003	Brazil	France	Spain
2004	Brazil	France	Argentina
2005	Brazil	Czech Republic	Netherlands
2006	Brazil	Italy	Argentina
2007	Argentina	Brazil	Italy
2008	Spain	Germany	Netherlands
2009	Spain	Brazil	Netherlands
2010	Spain	Netherlands	Germany
2011	Spain	Netherlands	Germany
2012	Spain	Germany	Argentina
2013	Spain	Germany	Argentina
2014	Germany	Argentina	Colombia
2015	Belgium	Argentina	Spain
2016	Argentina	Brazil	Germany
2017	Germany	Brazil	Portugal
2018	Belgium	France	Brazil
2019	Belgium	France	Brazil
2020	Belgium	France	Brazil
2021	Belgium	Brazil	France
2022	Brazil	Argentina	France
2023	Argentina	France	England
2024	Argentina	France	Spain
2025	Spain	Argentina	France

==== Performances by countries ====
Team	First place	Second place	Third place
Brazil	13 (1994, 1995, 1996, 1997, 1998, 1999, 2000, 2002, 2003, 2004, 2005, 2006, 2022)	5 (2007, 2009, 2016, 2017, 2021)	5 (1993, 2001, 2018, 2019, 2020)
Spain	7 (2008, 2009, 2010, 2011, 2012, 2013, 2025)	1 (1994)	4 (2002, 2003, 2015, 2024)
Belgium	5 (2015, 2018, 2019, 2020, 2021)	0	0
Argentina	4 (2007, 2016, 2023, 2024)	5 (2001, 2014, 2015, 2022, 2025)	5 (2000, 2004, 2006, 2012, 2013)
Germany	3 (1993, 2014, 2017)	6 (1995, 1996, 1997, 2008, 2012, 2013)	4 (1998, 2010, 2011, 2016)
France	1 (2001)	10 (1998, 2000, 2002, 2003, 2004, 2018, 2019, 2020, 2023, 2024)	5 (1996, 1999, 2021, 2022, 2025)
Netherlands	0	2 (2010, 2011)	3 (2005, 2008, 2009)
Italy	0	2 (1993, 2006)	2 (1995, 2007)
Czech Republic	0	2 (1999, 2005)	1 (1997)
Sweden	0	0	1 (1994)
Colombia	0	0	1 (2014)
Portugal	0	0	1 (2017)
England	0	0	1 (2023)

=== Best Mover of the Year ===
The Best Mover of the Year is awarded to the team who made the best progress up the rankings over the course of the year. In the FIFA rankings, this is not simply the team that has risen the most places, but a calculation is performed in order to account for the fact that it becomes progressively harder to earn more points the higher up the rankings a team is. The calculation done for the years 1993–2006, the era before the major FIFA World ranking calculation revision in July 2006, is the number of points the team has at the end of the year (z) multiplied by the number of points it earned during the year (y). The team with the highest index on this calculation received the award. The 1993–2006 table shows the top three best movers for each year.

In the years from 1993 until 2006, an official Best Mover Award was handed over to the coach of the winning national football team at the annual FIFA World Player Gala. For example, the coach of the Slovenia national football team (Srečko Katanec) received this official award at the FIFA World Player 1999 Awards Gala, with the award granted a few days after the year had ended on 24 January 2000. The award has not been an official part of the annual FIFA awards gala show, The Best FIFA Football Awards, since the show for 2006.

Year	First place	Second place	Third place
1993	Colombia	Portugal	Morocco
1994	Croatia	Brazil	Uzbekistan
1995	Jamaica	Trinidad and Tobago	Czech Republic
1996	South Africa	Paraguay	Canada
1997	FR Yugoslavia	Bosnia and Herzegovina	Iran
1998	Croatia	France	Argentina
1999	Slovenia	Cuba	Uzbekistan
2000	Nigeria	Honduras	Cameroon
2001	Costa Rica	Australia	Honduras
2002	Senegal	Wales	Brazil
2003	Bahrain	Oman	Turkmenistan
2004	China	Uzbekistan	Ivory Coast
2005	Ghana	Ethiopia	Switzerland
2006	Italy	Germany	France

While an official award has not been made for national team movements since 2006, FIFA has continued each year to release a list of the 'Best Movers' in the rankings. An example of the informal on-going "Mover of the Year" award is the recognition made by FIFA to Colombia in 2012 in an official press release. After implementation of the major FIFA World ranking calculation revision in July 2006, the calculation methodology to decide the "Mover of the Year" ranking also changed in 2007, to simply the difference between the FIFA world ranking points by the end of the year compared to 12 months earlier. The Best Mover results for all subsequent years are based on the same methodology.

Year	Best mover	Second best	Third best	Ref.
2007	Mozambique (+245 pts)	Norway (+240 pts)	New Caledonia (+220 pts)	
2008	Spain (+314 pts)	Montenegro (+245 pts)	Russia (+242 pts)	
2009	Brazil (+322 pts) Algeria (+322 pts)	—	Slovenia (+235 pts)	
2010	Netherlands (+435 pts)	Montenegro (+368 pts)	Botswana (+316 pts)	
2011	Wales (+330 pts)	Sierra Leone (+302 pts)	Bosnia and Herzegovina (+287 pts)	
2012	Colombia (+455 pts)	Ecuador (+365 pts)	Mali (+337 pts)	
2013	Ukraine (+312 pts)	Armenia (+259 pts)	United States (+237 pts)	
2014	Germany (+407 pts)	Slovakia (+334 pts)	Belgium (+317 pts)	
2015	Turkey (+329 pts)	Hungary (+313 pts)	Nicaragua (+295 pts)	
2016	France (+437 pts)	Peru (+321 pts)	Poland (+311 pts)	
2017	Denmark (+456 pts)	Sweden (+323 pts)	Bolivia (+315 pts)	
2018	France (+165 pts)	Uruguay (+151 pts)	Kosovo (+133 pts)	
2019	Qatar (+138 pts)	Algeria (+135 pts)	Japan (+89 pts)	
2020	Hungary (+44 pts)	Ecuador (+41 pts)	Malta (+32 pts)	
2021	Canada (+130.32 pts)	Italy (+115.77 pts)	Argentina (+108.51 pts)	
2022	Morocco (+142.42 pts)	Croatia (+106.88 pts)	Argentina (+87.87 pts)	
2023	Panama (+83.92 pts)	Moldova (+63.72 pts)	Malaysia (+56.27 pts)	
2024	Angola (+128.43 pts)	Spain (+120.63 pts)	Jordan (+103.28 pts)	
2025	Kosovo (+89.02 pts)	Norway (+68.70 pts)	Honduras (+53.61 pts)	

== See also ==
- FIFA Women's World Ranking
- Geography of association football
- Statistical association football predictions
- UEFA coefficient
- World Football Elo Ratings
