= FIFA Women's World Ranking =

Global sports team ranking list

Top 20 rankings as of 20 October 2026
Rank	Change	Team	Points
1	Steady	Spain	2121.5
2	Steady	United States	2042.38
3	Steady	Germany	2034.62
4	Steady	England	2025.47
5	Steady	Japan	1994.43
6	Steady	France	1983.77
7	Steady	Brazil	1970.87
8	Steady	Sweden	1938.13
9	Steady	Canada	1926.96
10	▲2	Denmark	1920.14
11	▼1	Netherlands	1918.3
12	▼1	North Korea	1916.52
13	▲1	Norway	1883.31
14	▼1	Italy	1871.59
15	Steady	Australia	1831.48
16	▲1	Iceland	1799.75
17	▲2	South Korea	1791.13
18	▼2	China	1786.8
19	▲1	Colombia	1780.16
20	▼2	Belgium	1780.06
*Change from 16 June 2026
*Next change on 7 December 2026
Complete rankings at FIFA.com

The FIFA Women's World Ranking (also stylized as the FIFA/Coca-Cola Women's World Ranking for sponsorship purposes) is a ranking system for women's national teams in association football (commonly known as football or soccer) published by the international governing body FIFA. As of August 2025, the Spain national team is ranked number one.

The rankings were introduced in 2003, with the first rankings published on 16 July of that year. FIFA attempts to assess the strength of internationally active women's national teams at any given time based on their past game results with the most successful teams being ranked highest. As of July 2025, the ranking has 196 national teams. The ranking has more than informative value, as it is often used to seed member associations into different pots in international tournaments.

== Specifics of the ranking system ==
- FIFA Women's World Rankings are based on every international match a team ever played, dating back to 1971, the first FIFA-recognized women's international between France and the Netherlands.
- FIFA Women's World Rankings are implicitly weighted to emphasize recent results.
- FIFA Women's World Rankings are only published four times a year. Normally, rankings are released in March, June, September and December. (In World Cup years, dates may be adjusted to reflect the World Cup results.)

The first two points result from the FIFA Women's World Rankings system being based on the Elo rating system adjusted for football; in 2018, FIFA modified the men's ranking system to similarly be based on Elo systems after continued criticism. FIFA considers the ratings for teams with fewer than 5 matches provisional and at the end of the list. In addition, any team that plays no matches for 4 years becomes unranked; this inactivity limit was previously 18 months, but was extended in early 2021 (after the COVID-19 pandemic stifled a significant amount of international play).

=== Ranking calculations ===
The rankings are based on the following formulae:

$R_{aft} = R_{bef} + K (S_{act} - S_{exp})$

$S_{exp} = \frac{1}{1 + 10^{-x/2}}$
$x = \frac{R_{bef} - O_{bef} \pm H}{c}$

Where

$R_{aft}$	= The team rating after the match
$R_{bef}$	= The team rating before the match
$K$	= $15 M$, the weighted importance of the match
$S_{act}$	= The actual result of the match, see below
$S_{exp}$	= The expected result of the match
$x$	= The scaled difference in rating points between the teams
$O_{bef}$	= The opposing team's rating before the match
$H$	= The "home advantage" correction, see below
$c$	= A scaling factor, see below
$M$	= The "Match Importance Factor", see below

The average points of all teams are about 1,300 points. The top nations usually exceed 2,000 points. In order to be ranked, a team must have played at least more than 5 matches against officially ranked teams, and have not been inactive for the last 48 months up to the date the rankings are published. Even if teams are not officially ranked, their points rating is kept constant until they play their next match.

==== Actual result of the match ====
The main component of the actual result is whether the team wins, loses, or draws, but goal difference is also taken into account. If the match results in a winner and loser, the loser is awarded a percentage given by the accompanying table, with the result always less than or equal to 20% (for goal differences greater than zero). The result is based on the goal difference and the number of goals they scored. The remaining percentage points are awarded to the winner. For example, a 2–1 match has the result awarded 84%–16% respectively, a 4–3 match has the result awarded 82%–18%, and an 5–3 match has the result awarded 96.2%–3.8%. As such, it is possible for a team to lose points even if they win a match, assuming they did not "win by enough". If the match ends in a draw the teams are awarded the same result, but the number depends on the goals scored so the results will not necessarily add up to 100%. For example, a 0–0 draw earns both teams 47% each, a 1–1 draw earns 50% each, and a 4–4 draw earns 52.5% each.

	Goal Difference						
	0	1	2	3	4	5	6 /+
Goals scored by non winning team	Actual result (percentage)						
0	47.0 / 47.0	85.0 / 15.0	92.0 / 8.0	96.0 / 4.0	97.0 / 3.0	98.0 / 2.0	99.0 / 1.0
1	50.0 / 50.0	84.0 / 16.0	91.1 / 8.9	95.2 / 4.8	96.3 / 3.7	97.4 / 2.6	98.5 / 1.5
2	51.0 / 51.0	83.0 / 17.0	90.2 / 9.8	94.4 / 5.6	95.6 / 4.4	96.8 / 3.2	98.0 / 2.0
3	52.0 / 52.0	82.0 / 18.0	89.3 / 10.7	93.6 / 6.4	94.9 / 5.1	96.2 / 3.8	97.5 / 2.5
4	52.5 / 52.5	81.0 / 19.0	88.4 / 11.6	92.8 / 7.2	94.2 / 5.8	95.6 / 4.4	97.0 / 3.0
5	53.0 / 53.0	80.0 / 20.0	87.5 / 12.5	92.0 / 8.0	93.5 / 6.5	95.0 / 5.0	96.5 / 3.5

==== Neutral ground or home field advantage ====
Historically, home teams earn 66% of the points available to them, with away teams earning the other 34%. To account for this, when two teams are not playing on neutral ground, the home team has its $R_{bef}$ inflated by 100 points for the purposes of calculation. That is, if two equally ranked teams playing at one team's home ground, the home team would be expected to win at the same rate a team playing on neutral ground with a 100-point advantage. This 100-point difference corresponds to a 64%–36% advantage in terms of expected result. The scaling factor remains the same (c=200).

==== Importance of the match ====
Match importance	Match importance factor (M)	K-value
FIFA Women's World Cup match	4	60
Women's Olympic football tournament	4	60
FIFA Women's World Cup qualifier	3	45
Women's Olympic football qualifier	3	45
Women's Continental finals match	3	45
Women's Continental qualifier	2	30
Women's friendly match between two Top 10 teams	2	30
Women's friendly match	1	15

== Schedule ==
Rankings are generally published four times a year. The next update is scheduled for 7 December 2026.

Since 2026, FIFA also releases a 'live ranking' during tournaments and after friendly matches, for comparative purposes only.

== Leaders ==
As of the 7 August 2025 rankings release, Spain is the number one ranked team. The United States holds the record for the longest consecutive period leading the rankings of nearly 7 years, from March 2008 to December 2014. Before the 2023 World Cup, the United States and Germany had been the only two teams to lead the women's rankings, and these two teams also had held the top two spots in all but six releases, when Germany was ranked third (only Norway, Brazil, England, and Sweden had reached second during this time).

No.	Team	Confederation	Days at No. 1
1	United States	CONCACAF	6,070 days
2	Germany	UEFA	1,701 days
3	Spain	UEFA	711 days (Note: Current leader as of 15 November 2026.)
4	Sweden	UEFA	112 days

=== All-time highs and lows for the leaders ===
Rank	Nation	High rating (rank) (Note: The ranking at the time the highest or lowest rating was reached.)	High rating date	High rank (first, last year)	Low rating (rank)	Low rating date	Low rank (first, last year)
1	Germany	2234 (1st)	16 Dec 2005	1st (2003, 2017)	1987.25 (6th)	15 Dec 2023	6th (2023)
2	United States	2233 (1st)	28 May 2010	1st 2003, 2025)	2015.95 (6th)	14 Jun 2024	5th (2025)
3	Spain	2121.50 (1st)	20 Oct 2026	1st (2023, 2026)	1754 (20th)	25 Mar 2005	22nd (2003)
4	Sweden	2103 (4th)	7 Jun 2004	1st (2023)	1934 (11th)	1 Sep 2017	17th (2017, 2018)

== See also ==
- Geography of women's association football
- FIFA International Match Calendar
- Statistical association football predictions
- UEFA coefficient
- World Football Elo Ratings
