= World Football Elo Ratings =

Ranking system for men's national association football teams

Top 20 rankings as of 6 October 2026
Rank	Change	Team	Points
1	Steady	Spain	2287
2	Steady	Argentina	2175
3	▲2	England	2146
4	▼1	France	2104
5	▼1	Portugal	2055
6	▲1	Brazil	2001
7	▼1	Colombia	1990
8	▲7	Switzerland	1975
9	▼1	Netherlands	1974
10	▲10	Belgium	1956
11	▲2	Italy	1910
12	▲3	Norway	1900
13	▲4	Japan	1897
14	▲9	Morocco	1896
15	▼1	Germany	1895
16	▲2	Mexico	1868
17	▼5	Denmark	1861
18	▼8	Croatia	1856
19	▼8	Uruguay	1851
20	▼11	Ecuador	1849
*Change from one year ago
Complete rankings at eloratings.net

The World Football Elo Ratings are a ranking system for men's national association football teams that is published by the website eloratings.net. It is based on the Elo rating system but includes modifications to take various football-specific variables into account, like the margin of victory, importance of a match, and home field advantage. Other implementations of the Elo rating system are possible and there is no single nor any official Elo ranking for football teams. FIFA's official rankings (both the FIFA World Rankings for men and the FIFA Women's World Rankings) are based on a modified version of the Elo formula, the men's rankings having switched away from FIFA's custom system in 2018. The Elo rankings have been found to have the highest predictive capability for football matches.

== History and overview ==
The Elo system, developed by Hungarian-American mathematician Arpad Elo, is used by FIDE, the international chess federation, to rate chess players, and by the European Go Federation, to rate Go players. In 1997, Bob Runyan adapted the Elo rating system to international football and posted the results on the Internet. He was also the first maintainer of the World Football Elo Ratings web site, currently maintained by Kirill Bulygin. Other implementations of the Elo rating system are possible.

The Elo system was adapted for football by adding a weighting for the kind of match, an adjustment for the home team advantage, and an adjustment for goal difference in the match result. The ratings consider all official international matches for which results are available. Ratings tend to converge on a team's true strength relative to its competitors after about 30 matches. Ratings for teams with fewer than 30 matches are considered provisional.

=== Comparison with other systems ===
A 2009 comparative study of eight methods found that the implementation of the Elo rating system described below had the highest predictive capability for football matches, while the men's FIFA ranking method (2006–2018 system) performed poorly.

The FIFA World Rankings is the official national teams rating system used by the international governing body of football. The FIFA Women's World Rankings system has used a modified version of the Elo formula since 2003. In June 2018, the FIFA ranking switched to an Elo-based ranking as well, starting from the current FIFA rating points. The major difference between the World Football Elo Rating and the new men's FIFA rating system is that the latter does not consider goal differential and counts a penalty shoot-out as a win/loss rather than a draw (neither method distinguishes a win in extra time from a win in regular time).

=== Other versions ===
The creation of the World Football Elo Ratings has been an inspiration for many other unofficial rankings of this format, such as the World Football Club Elo Ratings (published by clubelo.com) and Football Player Elo Ratings (published by playerelo.football).

== All-time team highs ==
The following is a list of the top 10 national football teams ranked by the highest Elo rating they ever reached.

Rank	Nation	High rating (rank) (Note: The ranking in parentheses is that at the time the highest rating was reached.)	High rating date (Note: The date given is when the highest or lowest rating was first reached.)	High rank (first,last year)
1	Spain	2290 (1st)	13 Nov 2026	1st (1920,2026)
2	Hungary	2230 (1st)	30 Jun 1954	1st (1952,1960)
3	Germany	2223 (1st)	13 Jul 2014	1st (1966,2017)
4	England	2216 (1st)	9 Sep 1912	1st (1872,1988)
5	Brazil	2195 (1st)	28 Nov 2022	1st (1958,2022)
6	Argentina	2175 (1st)	4 Oct 2026	1st (1929,2022)
7	Netherlands	2154 (2nd)	12 Jul 2014	1st (1978,2014)
8	France	2137 (1st)	30 May 2001	1st (1984,2018)
9	Italy	2132 (1st)	11 Jun 1939	1st (1952,2006)
10	Uruguay	2108 (1st)	13 Jun 1928	1st (1920,1929)

== Calculation principles ==
The ratings are based on the following formula:

$R_n = R_o + P$

where

$P = K G (W - W_e)$

Where;

$R_n$	= The new team rating
$R_o$	= The old team rating
$K$	= Weight index regarding the tournament of the match
$G$	= A number from the index of goal differences
$W$	= The result of the match
$W_e$	= The expected result
$P$	= Points Change

"Points Change" is rounded to the nearest integer before updating the team rating.

=== Status of match ===
The status of the match is incorporated by the use of a weight constant. The constant reflects the importance of a match, which, in turn, is determined entirely by which tournament the match is in; the weight constant for each major tournament is:

Tournament or Match type	K
World Cup, Olympic Games (1908–1980)	60
Continental championship and intercontinental tournaments	50
World Cup and Continental qualifiers and major tournaments	40
All other tournaments	30
Friendly matches	20

The FIFA adaptation of the Elo rating features 8 weights, with the last knockout stages in the World Cup weighing 12 times more than some friendly matches.

=== Number of goals ===
The number of goals is taken into account by use of a goal difference index. If the game is a draw or is won by one goal

$$G = 1$$

If the game is won by two goals

$$G = \frac{3}{2}$$

If the game is won by three or more goals:

- Where N is the goal difference ($\forall$ N ≥ 3)

$$G = \frac{11+N}{8}$$

Table of examples:

Goal Difference	0	+1	+2	+3	+4	+5	+6	+7	+8	+9	+10
G	1	1	1.5	1.75	1.875	2	2.125	2.25	2.375	2.5	2.625

=== Result of match ===
W is the result of the game (1 for a win, 0.5 for a draw, and 0 for a loss). This also holds when a game is won or lost in extra time. If the match is decided on penalties, however, the result of the game is considered a draw (W = 0.5).

=== Expected result of match ===
W_{e} is the expected result (win expectancy with a draw counting as 0.5) from the following formula:

$$W_e = \frac{1}{10^{-dr/400} + 1}$$

where dr equals the difference in ratings (add 100 points for the home team). So dr of 0 gives 0.5, of 120 gives 0.666 to the higher-ranked team and 0.334 to the lower, and of 800 gives 0.99 to the higher-ranked team and 0.01 to the lower. The FIFA adaptation of the Elo rating does not incorporate a home team advantage and has a larger divisor in the formula (600 vs. 400), making the points exchange less sensitive to the rating difference of two teams.

=== Examples for clarification ===
The same example of a three-team friendly tournament on neutral territory is used as on the FIFA World Rankings page. Beforehand team A had a rating of 630 points, team B 500 points, and teams C 480 points. The first table shows the points allocations based on three possible outcomes of the match between the strongest team A, and the somewhat weaker team B.

	Team A	Team B	Team A	Team B	Team A	Team B
Score	3–1		1–3		2–2	
$K$	20	20	20	20	20	20
$G$	1.5	1.5	1.5	1.5	1	1
$W$	1	0	0	1	0.5	0.5
$W_e$	0.679	0.321	0.679	0.321	0.679	0.321
Total (P)	+9.63	-9.63	-20.37	+20.37	-3.58	+3.58

When the difference in strength between the two teams is less, so also will be the difference in points allocation. The next table illustrates how the points would be divided following the same results as above, but with two roughly equally ranked teams, B and C, being involved:

	Team B	Team C	Team B	Team C	Team B	Team C
Score	3–1		1–3		2–2	
$K$	20	20	20	20	20	20
$G$	1.5	1.5	1.5	1.5	1	1
$W$	1	0	0	1	0.5	0.5
$W_e$	0.529	0.471	0.529	0.471	0.529	0.471
Total (P)	+14.13	-14.13	-15.87	+15.87	-0.58	+0.58

== See also ==
- Statistical association football predictions
- UEFA coefficient
