= UEFA Club Football Awards =

European association football awards

In recognition of the best players in the UEFA Champions League each year, UEFA gives out several awards to the most outstanding performers of the European club football season. The awards are presented in August each year at a special gala in Monaco; previously, the ceremony would coincide with the UEFA Super Cup, but since the Super Cup was moved to early August in 2014, the UEFA awards ceremony has been combined with the UEFA Champions League group stage draw. Internazionale and Real Madrid are the only teams whose players won all of the available awards in the same season (in the 2009–10 and 2017–18 seasons, respectively).

For the 2010–11 season, the UEFA Club Footballer of the Year award was replaced by the UEFA Best Player in Europe Award, but the positional awards returned in 2016–17. Positional awards for players in the UEFA Women's Champions League were introduced in 2019–20.

== Player(s) of the Year ==
=== UEFA Champions League Player of the Season ===
Season	Player	Club
2021–22	(France) Karim Benzema	(Spain) Real Madrid
2022–23	(Spain) Rodri	(England) Manchester City
2023–24	(Brazil) Vinícius Júnior	(Spain) Real Madrid
2024–25	(France) Ousmane Dembélé	(France) Paris Saint-Germain
2025–26	(Georgia (country)) Khvicha Kvaratskhelia	(France) Paris Saint-Germain

==== By country ====
Country	Players	Wins
France	2	2
Brazil	1	1
Georgia	1	1
Spain	1	1

==== By club ====
Club	Players	Wins
(France) Paris Saint-Germain	2	2
(Spain) Real Madrid	2	2
(England) Manchester City	1	1

=== UEFA Champions League Young Player of the Season ===
Season	Player	Club
2021–22	(Brazil) Vinícius Júnior	(Spain) Real Madrid
2022–23	(Georgia (country)) Khvicha Kvaratskhelia	(Italy) Napoli
2023–24	(England) Jude Bellingham	(Spain) Real Madrid
2024–25	(France) Désiré Doué	(France) Paris Saint-Germain
2025–26	(Turkey) Arda Güler	(Spain) Real Madrid

==== By country ====
Country	Players	Wins
Brazil	1	1
England	1	1
France	1	1
Georgia	1	1
Turkey	1	1

==== By club ====
Club	Players	Wins
(Spain) Real Madrid	3	3
(Italy) Napoli	1	1
(France) Paris Saint-Germain	1	1

=== UEFA Women's Champions League Player of the Season ===
Season	Player	Club
2021–22	(Spain) Alexia Putellas	(Spain) Barcelona
2022–23	(Spain) Aitana Bonmatí	(Spain) Barcelona
2023–24	(Spain) Aitana Bonmatí	(Spain) Barcelona
2024–25	(Spain) Aitana Bonmatí	(Spain) Barcelona
2025–26	(Spain) Alexia Putellas	(Spain) Barcelona

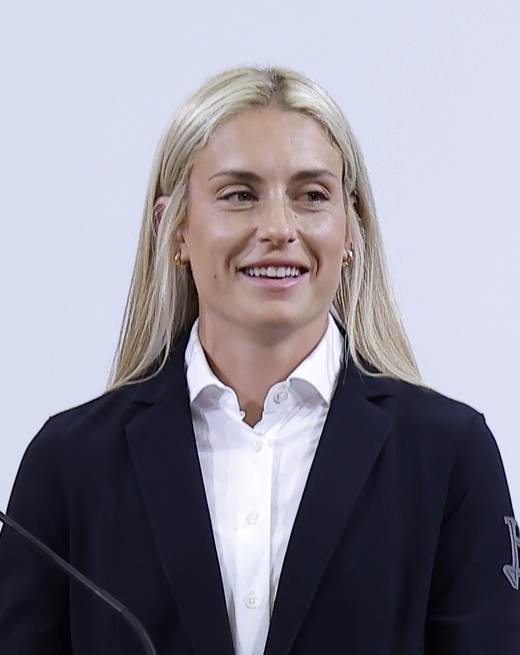
Alexia Putellas was the top scorer in the 2021–22 Champions League.

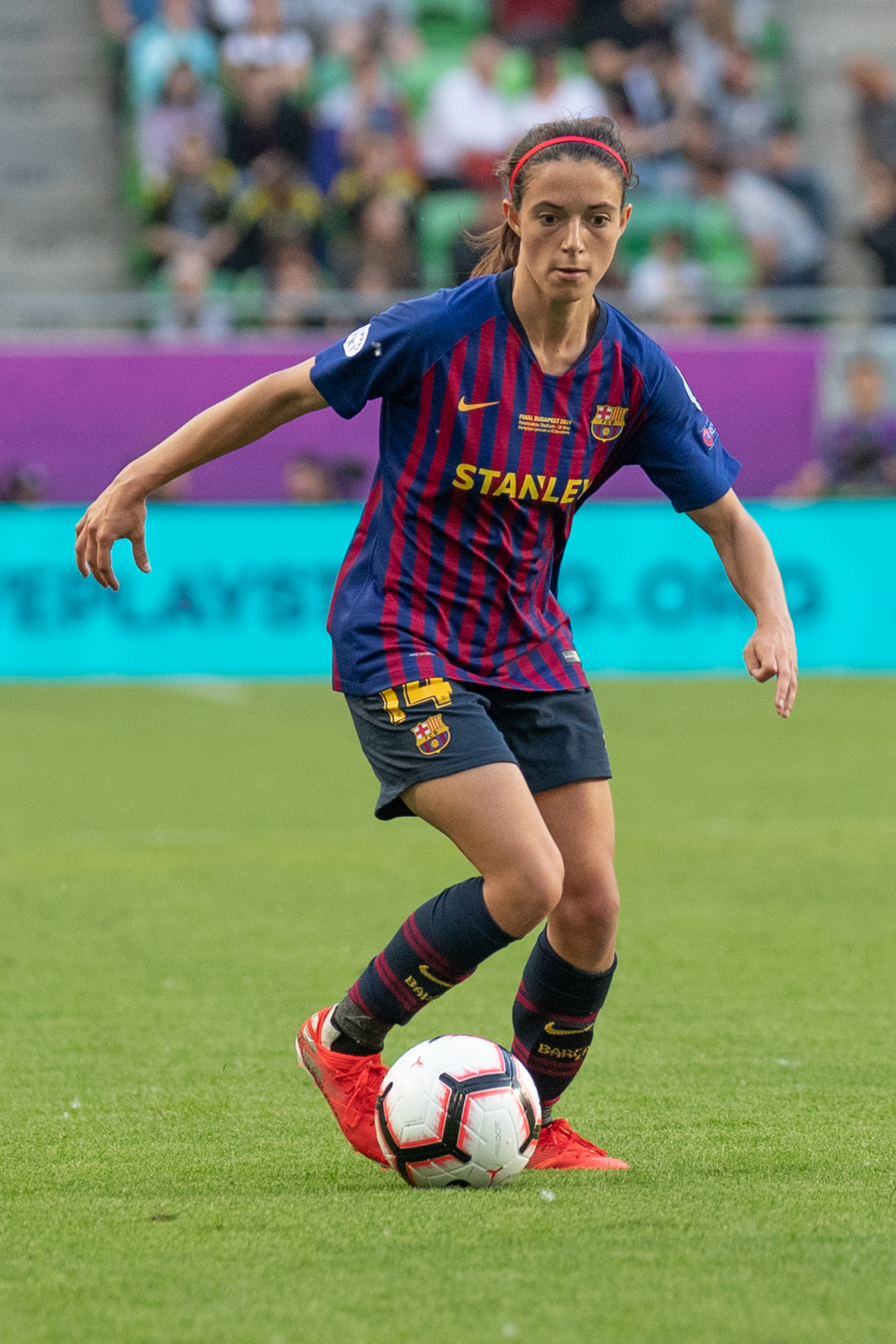
2022–23 Champions League winner Aitana Bonmatí.

==== By country ====
Country	Players	Wins
Spain	2	5

==== By club ====
Club	Players	Wins
(Spain) Barcelona	2	5

=== UEFA Women's Champions League Young Player of the Season ===
Season	Player	Club
2021–22	(France) Selma Bacha	(France) Lyon
2022–23	(Germany) Lena Oberdorf	(Germany) VfL Wolfsburg
2023–24	(Haiti) Melchie Dumornay	(France) Lyon
2024–25	(Haiti) Melchie Dumornay	(France) Lyon
2025–26	(United States) Lily Yohannes	(France) Lyon

==== By country ====
Country	Players	Wins
Haiti	1	2
Germany	1	1
France	1	1
United States	1	1

==== By club ====
Club	Players	Wins
(France) Lyon	3	4
(Germany) VfL Wolfsburg	1	1

== Best Goalkeeper ==
From 1998 to 2009 the Best European Goalkeeper was awarded to the same goalkeepers that won this award.

=== Men's award ===
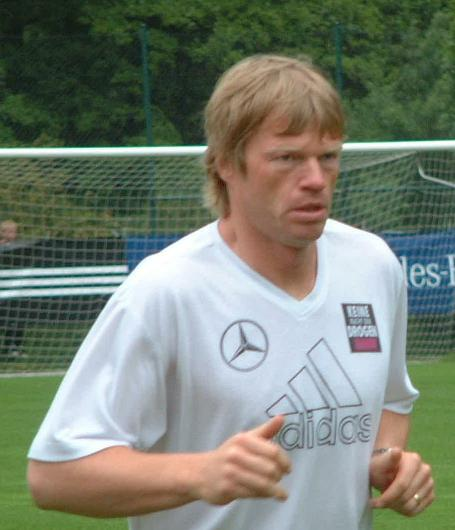
Oliver Kahn, who won this award four times consecutively while with Bayern Munich.

*Bold notes a player that won the UEFA Club Footballer Of The Year/UEFA Best Player in Europe award the same year.

Season	Player	Club
UEFA Club Goalkeeper of the Year
1997–98	(Denmark) Peter Schmeichel	(England) Manchester United
1998–99	(Germany) Oliver Kahn	(Germany) Bayern Munich
1999–2000	(Germany) Oliver Kahn	(Germany) Bayern Munich
2000–01	(Germany) Oliver Kahn	(Germany) Bayern Munich
2001–02	(Germany) Oliver Kahn	(Germany) Bayern Munich
2002–03	(Italy) Gianluigi Buffon	(Italy) Juventus
2003–04	(Portugal) Vítor Baía	(Portugal) Porto
2004–05	(Czech Republic) Petr Čech	(England) Chelsea
2005–06	(Germany) Jens Lehmann	(England) Arsenal
2006–07	(Czech Republic) Petr Čech	(England) Chelsea
2007–08	(Czech Republic) Petr Čech	(England) Chelsea
2008–09	(Netherlands) Edwin van der Sar	(England) Manchester United
2009–10	(Brazil) Júlio César	(Italy) Internazionale
2010–16	Not awarded	
UEFA Champions League Goalkeeper of the Season
2016–17	(Italy) Gianluigi Buffon	(Italy) Juventus
2017–18	(Costa Rica) Keylor Navas	(Spain) Real Madrid
2018–19	(Brazil) Alisson	(England) Liverpool
2019–20	(Germany) Manuel Neuer	(Germany) Bayern Munich
2020–21	(Senegal) Édouard Mendy	(England) Chelsea

==== By country ====
Country	Players	Wins
Germany	3	6
Czech Republic	1	3
Brazil	2	2
Italy	1	2
Denmark	1	1
Portugal	1	1
Netherlands	1	1
Costa Rica	1	1
Senegal	1	1

==== By club ====
Club	Players	Wins
(Germany) Bayern Munich	2	5
(England) Chelsea	2	4
(England) Manchester United	2	2
(Italy) Juventus	1	2
(Portugal) Porto	1	1
(England) Arsenal	1	1
(Italy) Internazionale	1	1
(Spain) Real Madrid	1	1
(England) Liverpool	1	1

=== Women's award ===
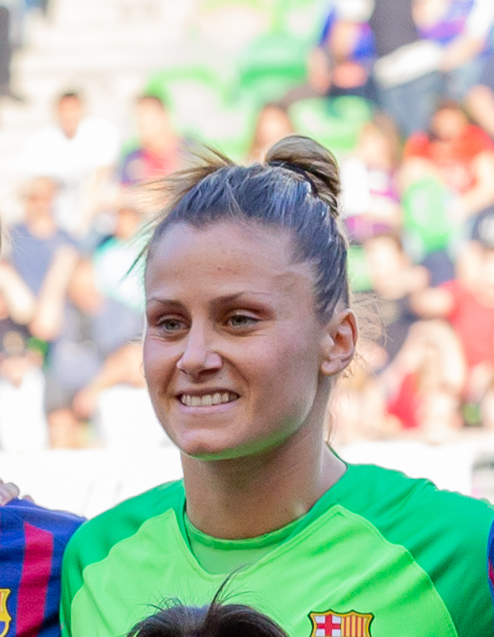
Named to the Squad of the Season and Goalkeeper of the Season, Sandra Paños

*Bold notes a player that won the UEFA Women's Player of the Year award the same year.

Season	Player	Club
UEFA Champions League Goalkeeper of the Season
2019–20	(France) Sarah Bouhaddi	(France) Lyon
2020–21	(Spain) Sandra Paños	(Spain) Barcelona

==== By country ====
Country	Players	Wins
France	1	1
Spain	1	1

==== By club ====
Club	Players	Wins
(France) Lyon	1	1
(Spain) Barcelona	1	1

== Best Defender ==
=== Men's award ===
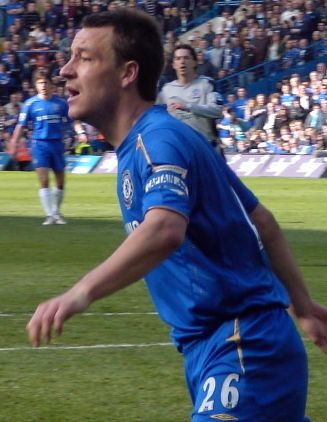
John Terry, who won this award a record three times, all with Chelsea.

*Bold notes a player that won the UEFA Club Footballer Of The Year/UEFA Best Player in Europe award the same year.

Season	Player	Club
UEFA Club Defender of the Year
1997–98	(Spain) Fernando Hierro	(Spain) Real Madrid
1998–99	(Netherlands) Jaap Stam	(England) Manchester United
1999–2000	(Netherlands) Jaap Stam	(England) Manchester United
2000–01	(Argentina) Roberto Ayala	(Spain) Valencia
2001–02	(Brazil) Roberto Carlos	(Spain) Real Madrid
2002–03	(Brazil) Roberto Carlos	(Spain) Real Madrid
2003–04	(Portugal) Ricardo Carvalho	(Portugal) Porto
2004–05	(England) John Terry	(England) Chelsea
2005–06	(Spain) Carles Puyol	(Spain) Barcelona
2006–07	(Italy) Paolo Maldini	(Italy) Milan
2007–08	(England) John Terry	(England) Chelsea
2008–09	(England) John Terry	(England) Chelsea
2009–10	(Brazil) Maicon	(Italy) Internazionale
2010–16	Not awarded	
UEFA Champions League Defender of the Season
2016–17	(Spain) Sergio Ramos	(Spain) Real Madrid
2017–18	(Spain) Sergio Ramos	(Spain) Real Madrid
2018–19	(Netherlands) Virgil van Dijk	(England) Liverpool
2019–20	(Germany) Joshua Kimmich	(Germany) Bayern Munich
2020–21	(Portugal) Rúben Dias	(England) Manchester City

==== By country ====
Country	Players	Wins
Spain	3	4
Brazil	2	3
Netherlands	2	3
England	1	3
Portugal	2	2
Argentina	1	1
Italy	1	1
Germany	1	1

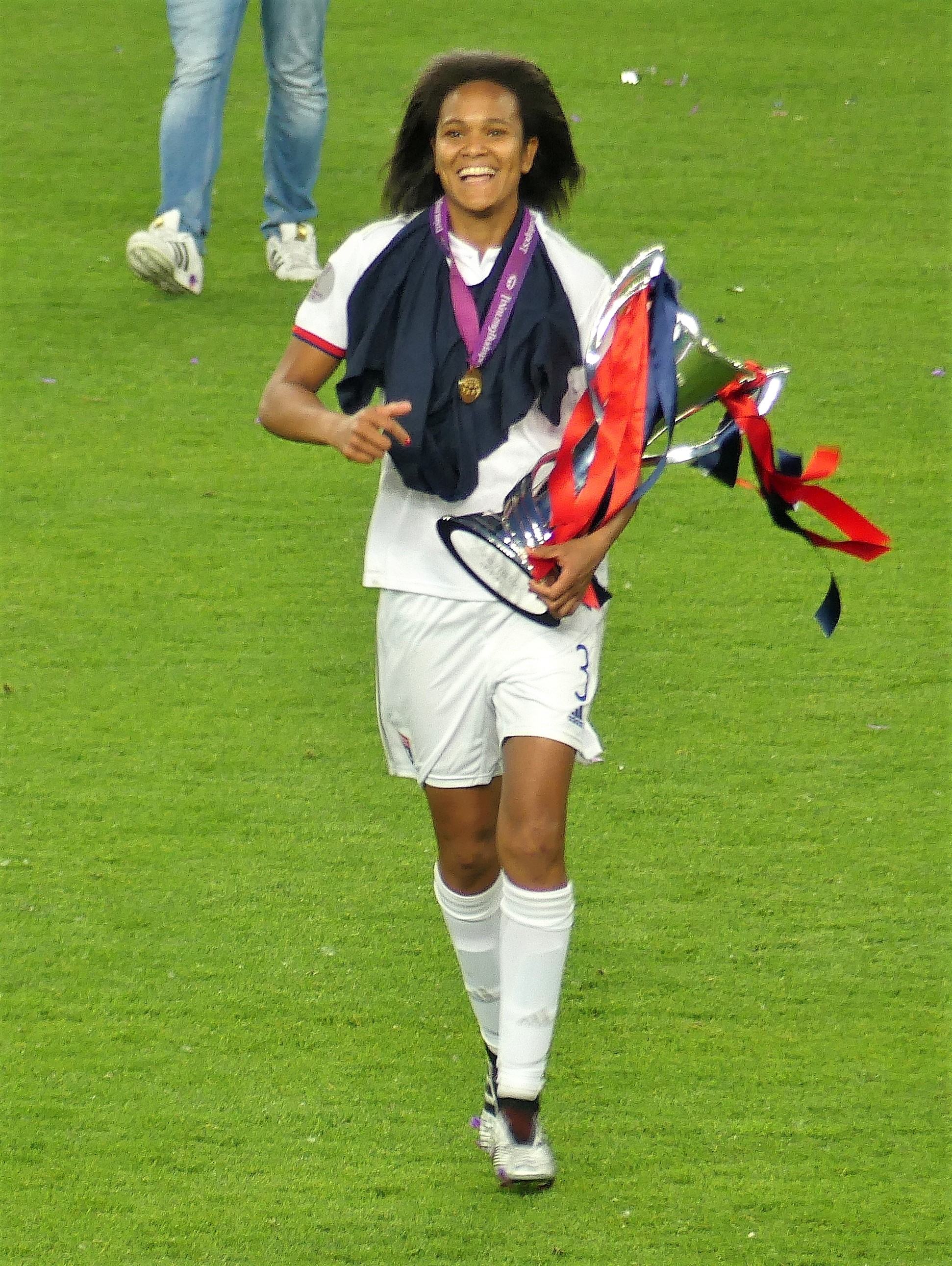
2019–20 Defender of the Season Wendie Renard

==== By club ====
Club	Players	Wins
(Spain) Real Madrid	3	5
(England) Chelsea	1	3
(England) Manchester United	1	2
(Spain) Valencia	1	1
(Portugal) Porto	1	1
(Spain) Barcelona	1	1
(Italy) Milan	1	1
(Italy) Internazionale	1	1
(England) Liverpool	1	1
(Germany) Bayern Munich	1	1
(England) Manchester City	1	1

=== Women's award ===
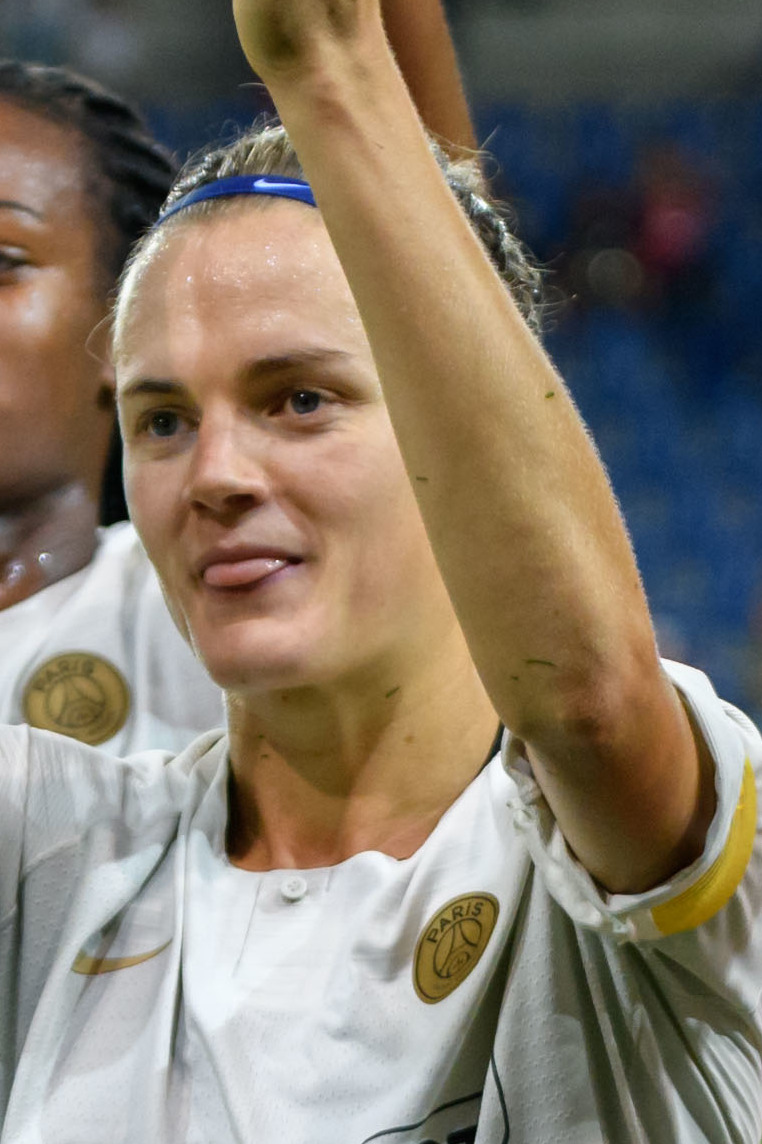
Captain Irene Paredes, who led PSG to their first ever league title.

*Bold notes a player that won the UEFA Women's Player of the Year award the same year.

Season	Player	Club
UEFA Champions League Defender of the Season
2019–20	(France) Wendie Renard	(France) Lyon
2020–21	(Spain) Irene Paredes	(France) Paris Saint-Germain

==== By country ====
Country	Players	Wins
France	1	1
Spain	1	1

==== By club ====
Club	Players	Wins
(France) Lyon	1	1
(France) Paris Saint-Germain	1	1

== Best Midfielder ==
=== Men's award ===
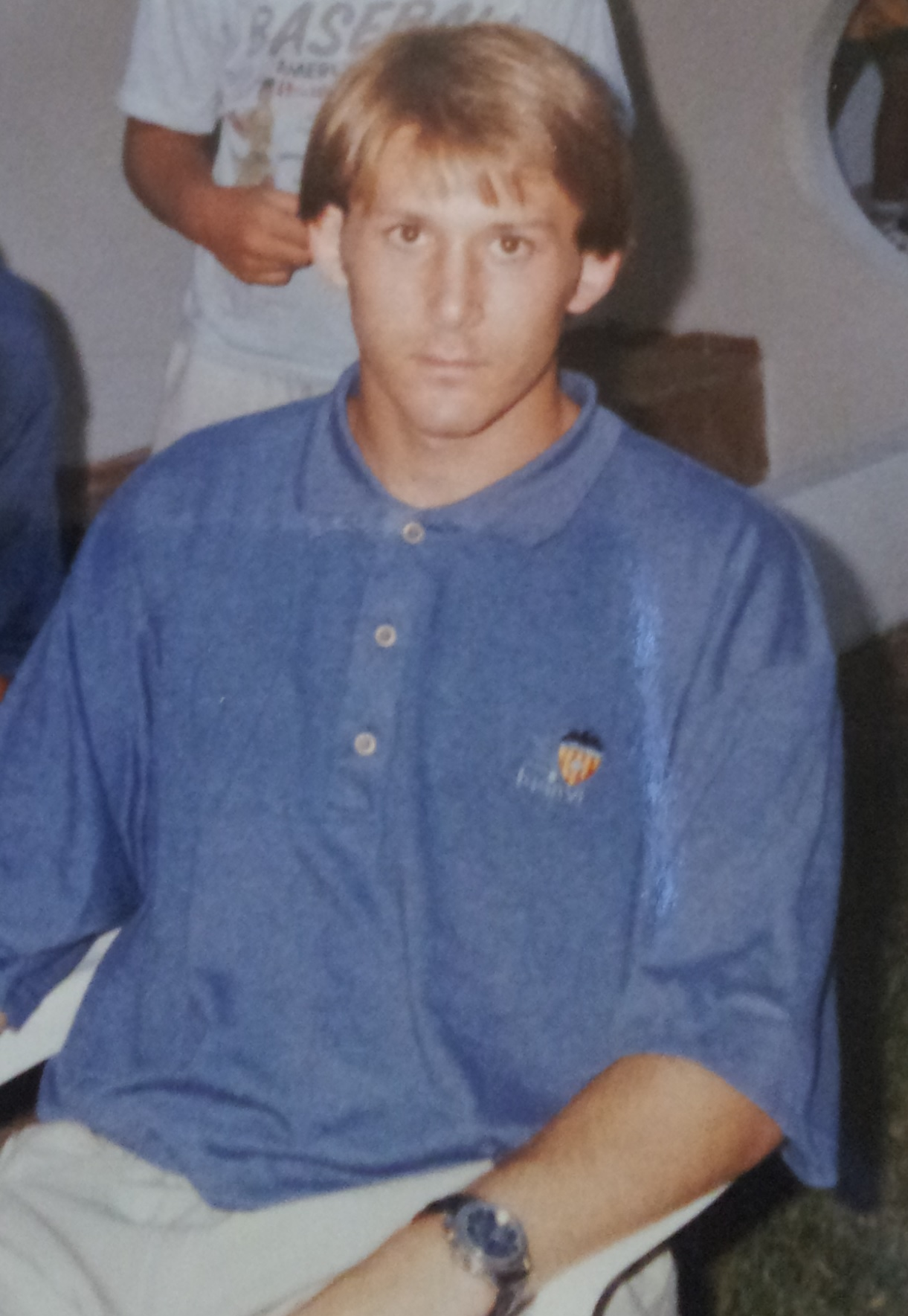
Gaizka Mendieta, who won this award twice in a row with Valencia.

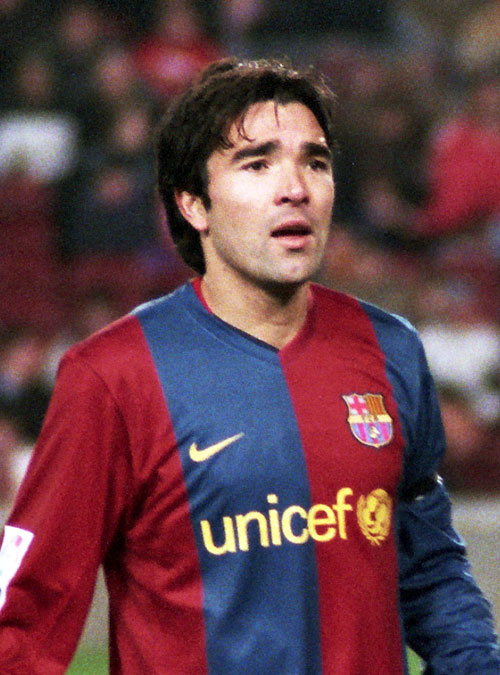
Deco, who won the award with two different clubs: Porto and Barcelona.

*Bold notes a player who also won the UEFA Club Footballer of the Year/UEFA Best Player in Europe award the same year.

Season	Player	Club
UEFA Club Midfielder of the Year
1997–98	(France) Zinedine Zidane	(Italy) Juventus
1998–99	(England) David Beckham	(England) Manchester United
1999–2000	(Spain) Gaizka Mendieta	(Spain) Valencia
2000–01	(Spain) Gaizka Mendieta	(Spain) Valencia
2001–02	(Germany) Michael Ballack	(Germany) Bayer Leverkusen
2002–03	(Czech Republic) Pavel Nedvěd	(Italy) Juventus
2003–04	(Portugal) Deco	(Portugal) Porto
2004–05	(Brazil) Kaká	(Italy) Milan
2005–06	(Portugal) Deco	(Spain) Barcelona
2006–07	(Netherlands) Clarence Seedorf	(Italy) Milan
2007–08	(England) Frank Lampard	(England) Chelsea
2008–09	(Spain) Xavi	(Spain) Barcelona
2009–10	(Netherlands) Wesley Sneijder	(Italy) Internazionale
2010–16	Not awarded	
UEFA Champions League Midfielder of the Season
2016–17	(Croatia) Luka Modrić	(Spain) Real Madrid
2017–18	(Croatia) Luka Modrić	(Spain) Real Madrid
2018–19	(Netherlands) Frenkie de Jong	(Netherlands) Ajax
2019–20	(Belgium) Kevin De Bruyne	(England) Manchester City
2020–21	(France) N'Golo Kanté	(England) Chelsea

==== By country ====
Country	Players	Wins
Netherlands	3	3
Spain	2	3
England	2	2
France	2	2
Portugal	1	2
Croatia	1	2
Germany	1	1
Czech Republic	1	1
Brazil	1	1
Belgium	1	1

==== By club ====
Club	Players	Wins
(Italy) Juventus	2	2
(Italy) Milan	2	2
(Spain) Barcelona	2	2
(England) Chelsea	2	2
(Spain) Valencia	1	2
(Spain) Real Madrid	1	2
(England) Manchester United	1	1
(Germany) Bayer Leverkusen	1	1
(Portugal) Porto	1	1
(Italy) Internazionale	1	1
(Netherlands) Ajax	1	1
(England) Manchester City	1	1

=== Women's award ===
*Bold notes a player that won the UEFA Women's Player of the Year award the same year.

Season	Player	Club
UEFA Champions League Midfielder of the Season
2019–20	(Germany) Dzsenifer Marozsán	(France) Lyon
2020–21	(Spain) Alexia Putellas	(Spain) Barcelona

==== By country ====
Country	Players	Wins
Germany	1	1
Spain	1	1

==== By club ====
Club	Players	Wins
(France) Lyon	1	1
(Spain) Barcelona	1	1

== Best Forward ==
=== Men's award ===
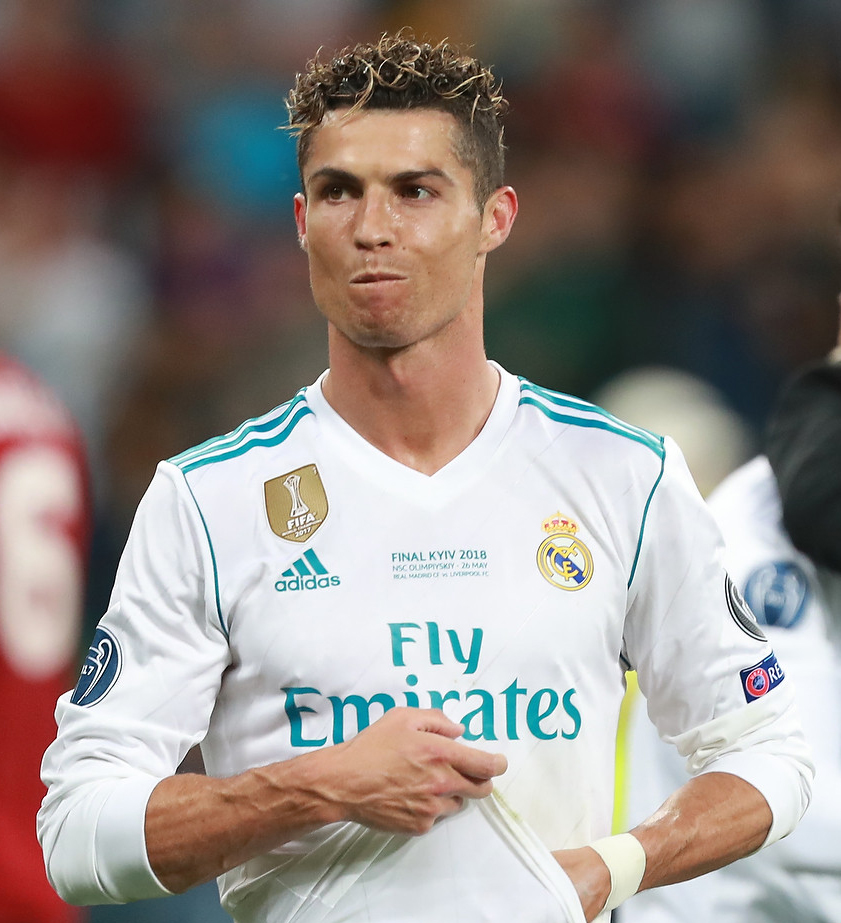
Cristiano Ronaldo won this award a joint-record three times, and is the only player to win with multiple clubs.

*Bold notes a player who won the UEFA Club Footballer Of The Year/UEFA Best Player in Europe award the same year.

Season	Player	Club
UEFA Club Forward of the Year
1997–98	(Brazil) Ronaldo	(Italy) Internazionale
1998–99	(Ukraine) Andriy Shevchenko	(Ukraine) Dynamo Kyiv
1999–2000	(Spain) Raúl	(Spain) Real Madrid
2000–01	(Spain) Raúl	(Spain) Real Madrid
2001–02	(Spain) Raúl	(Spain) Real Madrid
2002–03	(Netherlands) Ruud van Nistelrooy	(England) Manchester United
2003–04	(Spain) Fernando Morientes	(France) Monaco
2004–05	(Brazil) Ronaldinho	(Spain) Barcelona
2005–06	(Cameroon) Samuel Eto'o	(Spain) Barcelona
2006–07	(Brazil) Kaká	(Italy) Milan
2007–08	(Portugal) Cristiano Ronaldo	(England) Manchester United
2008–09	(Argentina) Lionel Messi	(Spain) Barcelona
2009–10	(Argentina) Diego Milito	(Italy) Internazionale
2010–16	Not awarded	
UEFA Champions League Forward of the Season
2016–17	(Portugal) Cristiano Ronaldo	(Spain) Real Madrid
2017–18	(Portugal) Cristiano Ronaldo	(Spain) Real Madrid
2018–19	(Argentina) Lionel Messi	(Spain) Barcelona
2019–20	(Poland) Robert Lewandowski	(Germany) Bayern Munich
2020–21	(Norway) Erling Haaland	(Germany) Borussia Dortmund

==== By country ====
Country	Players	Wins
Spain	2	4
Brazil	3	3
Argentina	2	3
Portugal	1	3
Ukraine	1	1
Netherlands	1	1
Cameroon	1	1
Poland	1	1
Norway	1	1

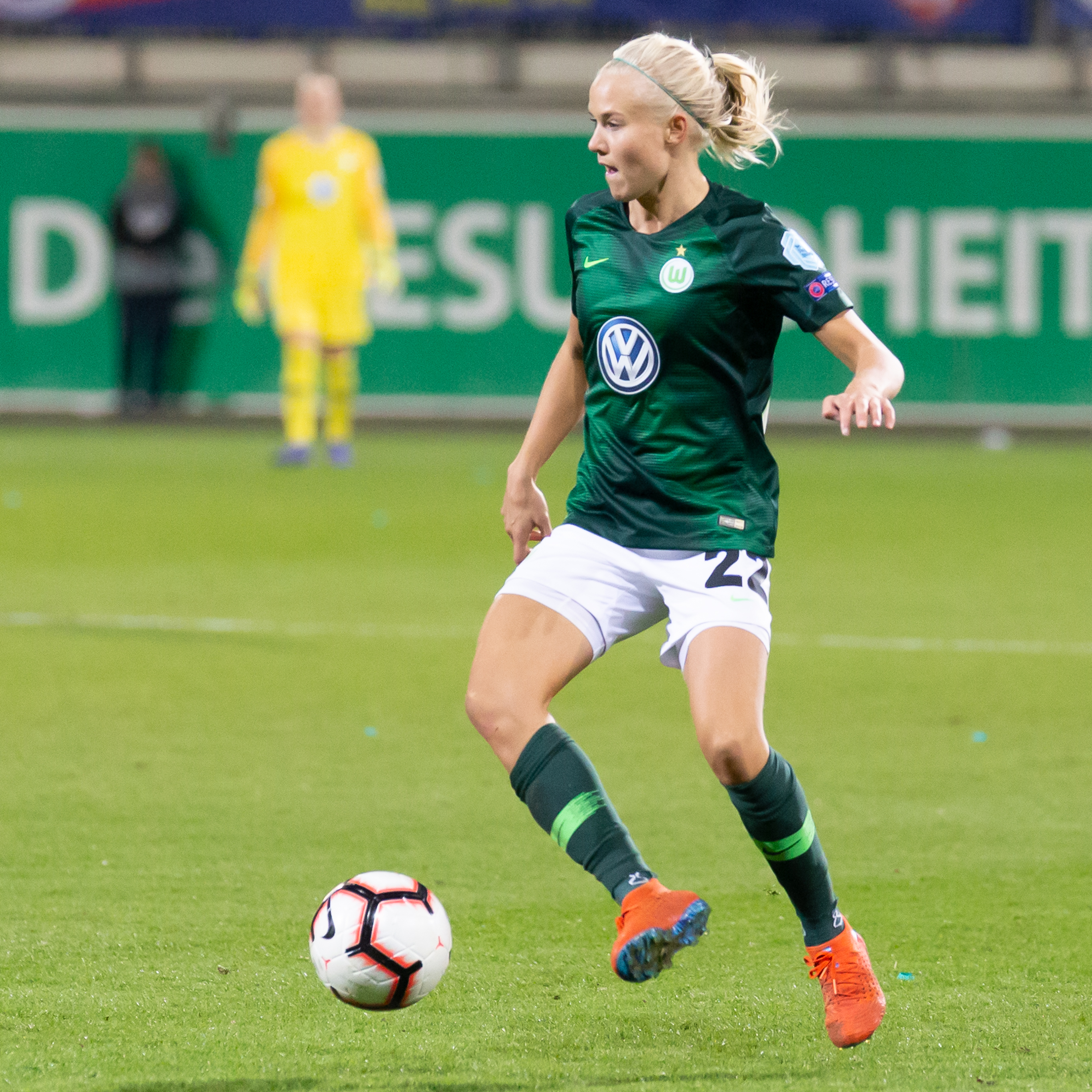
Two-time Player of the Year and 2019–20 Forward of the Season Pernille Harder.

==== By club ====
Club	Players	Wins
(Spain) Real Madrid	2	5
(Spain) Barcelona	3	4
(England) Manchester United	2	2
(Italy) Internazionale	2	2
(Ukraine) Dynamo Kyiv	1	1
(France) Monaco	1	1
(Italy) Milan	1	1
(Germany) Bayern Munich	1	1
(Germany) Borussia Dortmund	1	1

=== Women's award ===
*Bold notes a player that won the UEFA Women's Player of the Year award the same year.

Season	Player	Club
UEFA Champions League Forward of the Season
2019–20	(Denmark) Pernille Harder	(Germany) VfL Wolfsburg
2020–21	(Spain) Jennifer Hermoso	(Spain) Barcelona

==== By country ====
Country	Players	Wins
Denmark	1	1
Spain	1	1

==== By club ====
Club	Players	Wins
(Germany) VfL Wolfsburg	1	1
(Spain) Barcelona	1	1

== Coach(es) of the Year ==
=== European Football Coach of the Season ===
Season	Coach(es)	Club(s)
1997–98	(Italy) Marcello Lippi	(Italy) Juventus
1998–99	(Scotland) Alex Ferguson	(England) Manchester United
1999–2000	(Argentina) Héctor Cúper	(Spain) Valencia
2000–01	(Germany) Ottmar Hitzfeld	(Germany) Bayern Munich
2001–02	(Spain) Vicente del Bosque	(Spain) Real Madrid
2002–03	(Italy) Carlo Ancelotti (Portugal) José Mourinho	(Italy) Milan (Portugal) Porto
2003–04	(Portugal) José Mourinho (Spain) Rafael Benítez	(Portugal) Porto (Spain) Valencia
2004–05	(Spain) Rafael Benítez (Russia) Valery Gazzaev	(England) Liverpool (Russia) CSKA Moscow
2005–06	(Netherlands) Frank Rijkaard (Spain) Juande Ramos	(Spain) Barcelona (Spain) Sevilla

=== UEFA Men's Coach of the Year ===
Season	Coach	Team(s)
2019–20	(Germany) Hansi Flick	(Germany) Bayern Munich
2020–21	(Germany) Thomas Tuchel	(France) Paris Saint-Germain (England) Chelsea
2021–22	(Italy) Carlo Ancelotti	(Spain) Real Madrid
2022–23	(Spain) Pep Guardiola	(England) Manchester City

==== By country ====
Country	Coaches	Wins
Spain	4	5
Germany	3	3
Italy	2	3
Portugal	1	2
Scotland	1	1
Argentina	1	1
Russia	1	1
Netherlands	1	1

==== By club ====
Club	Coaches	Wins
(Spain) Valencia	2	2
(Germany) Bayern Munich	2	2
(Spain) Real Madrid	2	2
(Portugal) Porto	1	2
(Italy) Juventus	1	1
(England) Manchester United	1	1
(Italy) Milan	1	1
(England) Liverpool	1	1
(Russia) CSKA Moscow	1	1
(Spain) Barcelona	1	1
(Spain) Sevilla	1	1
(France) Paris Saint-Germain	1	1
(England) Chelsea	1	1
(England) Manchester City	1	1

=== UEFA Women's Coach of the Year ===
Season	Coach	Team(s)
2019–20	(France) Jean-Luc Vasseur	(France) Lyon
2020–21	(Spain) Lluís Cortés	(Spain) Barcelona
2021–22	(Netherlands) Sarina Wiegman	England
2022–23	(Netherlands) Sarina Wiegman	England

==== By country ====
Country	Coaches	Wins
Netherlands	1	2
France	1	1
Spain	1	1

==== By club ====
Club	Coaches	Wins
England	1	2
(France) Lyon	1	1
(Spain) Barcelona	1	1

== UEFA Technical Observers Best Goal of the Season ==
This award is chosen by UEFA Technical Observers as the best goal of the season. Cristiano Ronaldo and Federico Valverde have both won this award twice, more than any other player.

Season	Player	Team
2014–15	(South Korea) Son Heung-min	(Germany) Bayer Leverkusen
2015–16	(Switzerland) Stephan Lichtsteiner	(Italy) Juventus
2016–17	(Croatia) Mario Mandžukić	(Italy) Juventus
2017–18	(Portugal) Cristiano Ronaldo	(Spain) Real Madrid
2018–19	(Portugal) Cristiano Ronaldo	(Italy) Juventus
2019–20	(Argentina) Lionel Messi	(Spain) Barcelona
2020–21	Not awarded	
2021–22	(France) Karim Benzema	(Spain) Real Madrid
2022–23	(Norway) Erling Haaland	(England) Manchester City
2023–24	(Uruguay) Federico Valverde	(Spain) Real Madrid
2024–25	(Spain) Lamine Yamal	(Spain) Barcelona
2025–26	(Uruguay) Federico Valverde	(Spain) Real Madrid

== UEFA Fans' Goal of the Tournament ==
This award is voted by the fans as the best goal of the season. Lionel Messi has won this award four times, more than any other player.

Season	Player	Team
2014–15	(Argentina) Lionel Messi	(Spain) Barcelona
2015–16	(Argentina) Lionel Messi	(Spain) Barcelona
2016–17	(Croatia) Mario Mandžukić	(Italy) Juventus
2017–18	(Portugal) Cristiano Ronaldo	(Spain) Real Madrid
2018–19	(Argentina) Lionel Messi	(Spain) Barcelona
2019–20	Not awarded	
2020–21	(Iran) Mehdi Taremi	(Portugal) Porto
2021–22	(Spain) Thiago	(England) Liverpool
2022–23	(Argentina) Lionel Messi	(France) Paris Saint-Germain
2023–24	(Brazil) Tetê	(Turkey) Galatasaray
2024–25	(Spain) Lamine Yamal	(Spain) Barcelona

=== By country ===
Country	Players	Wins
Argentina	1	4
Spain	2	2
Brazil	1	1
Croatia	1	1
Iran	1	1
Portugal	1	1

=== By club ===
Club	Players	Wins
(Spain) Barcelona	2	4
(Turkey) Galatasaray	1	1
(Italy) Juventus	1	1
(England) Liverpool	1	1
(France) Paris Saint-Germain	1	1
(Portugal) Porto	1	1
(Spain) Real Madrid	1	1

== See also ==
- UEFA Men's Player of the Year Award
- UEFA Women's Player of the Year Award
- UEFA Men's Coach of the Year Award
- UEFA Women's Coach of the Year Award
- UEFA Club Footballer of the Year
- UEFA Team of the Year
