= UEFA Women's Coach of the Year Award =

UEFA Women's Coach of the Year
- Sponsored by: ESM
- Presented by: UEFA
- First award: 2020
- Final award: 2023

Highlights
- Most wins: (Netherlands) Sarina Wiegman (2nd awards)
- Website: uefa.com

The UEFA Women's Coach of the Year Award is an association football award given to the manager coaching a women's football club in Europe that is considered the best in the previous season of both club and national team competition. The award, created in 2020 by UEFA in partnership with European Sports Media (ESM) group, was announced alongside the UEFA Men's Coach of the Year Award.

== Criteria ==
According to UEFA, for this award, "coaches in Europe, irrespective of nationality, [are] judged in regard to their performances over the whole season in all competitions – both domestically and internationally – at either club, or national team level."

== Voting ==
For the inaugural award, the eight coaches from the clubs that participated in the quarter-finals of that year's UEFA Women's Champions League, along with 20 sports journalists selected by the European Sports Media group specializing in women's football, provided a list of their three best-ranked coaches from one to three, with the first player receiving five points, the second three points and the third one point. Coaches were not allowed to vote for themselves. The three coaches with the most points overall were shortlisted, and the winner was announced during the group stage draw of the next season's UEFA Champions League.

== Award history ==
=== Winners ===
Season	Coach	Team(s) managed
2019–20	(France) Jean-Luc Vasseur	(France) Lyon
2020–21	(Spain) Lluís Cortés	(Spain) Barcelona
2021–22	(Netherlands) Sarina Wiegman	England
2022–23	(Netherlands) Sarina Wiegman	England

=== Finalists ===
Winner Shortlisted

==== 2019–20 ====
Rank	Coach	Points	Team(s) managed
1	(France) Jean-Luc Vasseur	122	(France) Lyon
2	(Germany) Stephan Lerch	78	(Germany) VfL Wolfsburg
3	(Spain) Lluís Cortés	36	(Spain) Barcelona
4	(England) Emma Hayes	28	(England) Chelsea
5	(Netherlands) Sarina Wiegman	22	Netherlands
6	(France) Olivier Echouafni	18	(France) Paris Saint-Germain
7	(Germany) Jens Scheuer	15	(Germany) Bayern Munich
8	(Australia) Joe Montemurro	5	(England) Arsenal
9	(Scotland) Scott Booth	4	(Scotland) Glasgow City
10	(Spain) Dani González	3	(Spain) Atlético Madrid

==== 2020–21 ====
Rank	Coach	Points	Team(s) managed
1	(Spain) Lluís Cortés	151	(Spain) Barcelona
2	(England) Emma Hayes	78	(England) Chelsea
3	(Sweden) Peter Gerhardsson	37	Sweden
4	(France) Olivier Echouafni	24	(France) Paris Saint-Germain
5	(Germany) Jens Scheuer	17	(Germany) Bayern Munich
6	(Italy) Rita Guarino	10	(Italy) Juventus
6	(Sweden) Anna Signeul	10	Finland
8	(Netherlands) Sarina Wiegman	7	Netherlands
9	(England) Gareth Taylor	5	(England) Manchester City
10	(Spain) Jorge Vilda	3	Spain

==== 2021–22 ====
Rank	Coach	Points	Team(s) managed
1	(Netherlands) Sarina Wiegman	200	England
2	(France) Sonia Bompastor	94	(France) Lyon
3	(Germany) Martina Voss-Tecklenburg	71	Germany
4	(Spain) Jonatan Giráldez	27	(Spain) Barcelona
5	(Germany) Tommy Stroot	22	(Germany) VfL Wolfsburg

==== 2022–23 ====
Rank	Coach	Points	Team(s) managed
1	(Netherlands) Sarina Wiegman	211	England
2	(Spain) Jorge Vilda	163	Spain
3	(Spain) Jonatan Giráldez	139	(Spain) Barcelona
4	(Sweden) Peter Gerhardsson	62	Sweden
5	(England) Emma Hayes	56	(England) Chelsea
6	(Italy) Alessandro Spugna	12	(Italy) Roma
7	(Sweden) Jonas Eidevall	11	(England) Arsenal
8	(Germany) Tommy Stroot	9	(Germany) VfL Wolfsburg
9	(France) Sonia Bompastor	7	(France) Lyon
10	(England) Marc Skinner	0	(England) Manchester United

== See also ==
- UEFA Club Football Awards
- UEFA Men's Coach of the Year Award
- The Best FIFA Football Coach
