= IFFHS World's Best Club Coach =

Association football award

IFFHS World's Best Man Club Coach
- Sport: Association football
- Awarded for: Best performing man club coach of the calendar year
- Presented by: International Federation of Football History & Statistics

History
- First award: 1996
- Editions: 30
- First winner: (Italy) Marcello Lippi
- Most wins: (Portugal) José Mourinho (Italy) Carlo Ancelotti (4 awards)
- Most recent: (Spain) Luis Enrique (2nd award)
- Website: iffhs.com/en

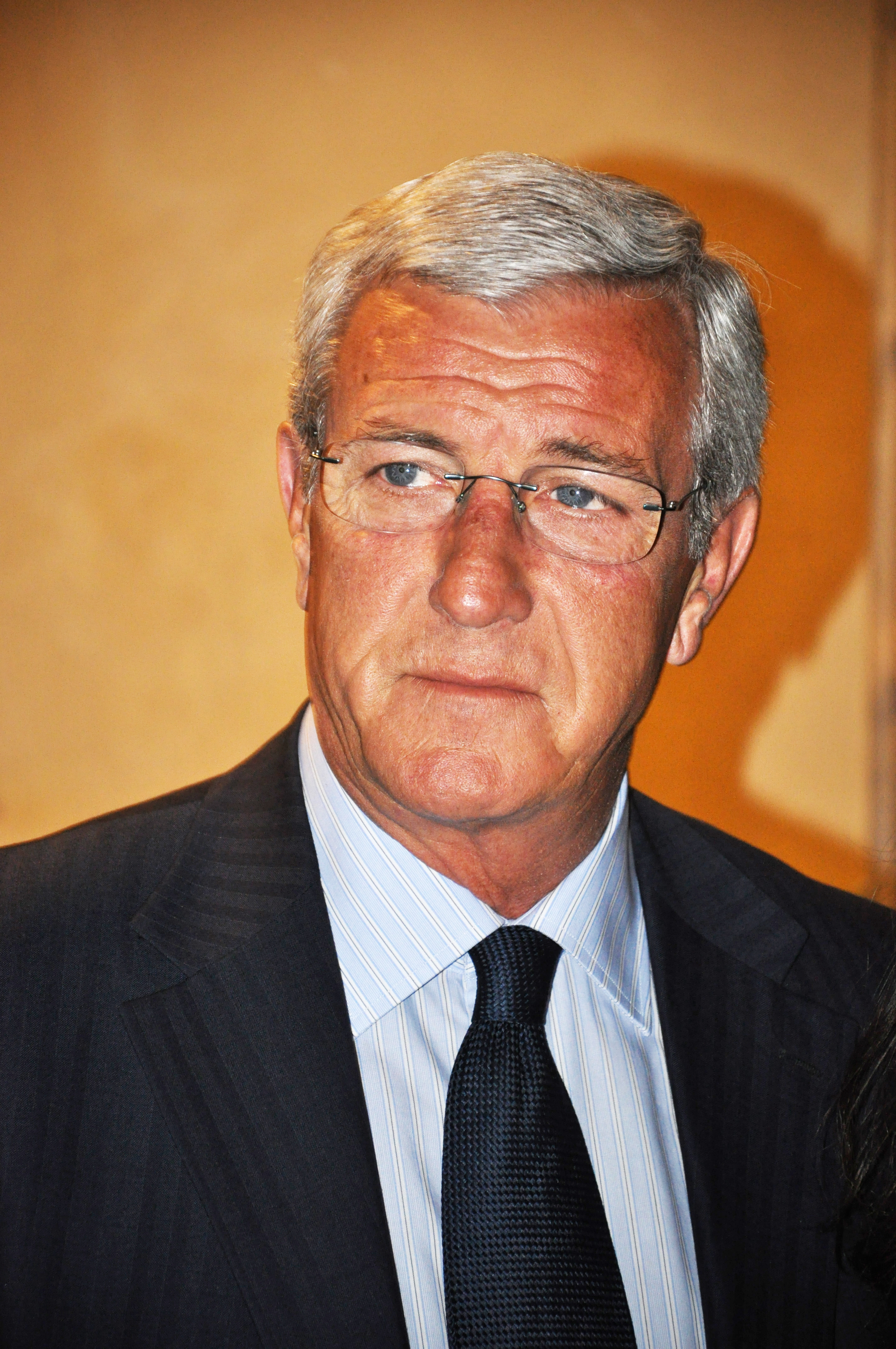
Marcello Lippi, 1996 Best Club Coach of the Year, first winner of the award

The IFFHS World's Best Club Coach is an association football award given annually, since 1996, to the most outstanding club coach as voted by the International Federation of Football History & Statistics (IFFHS), an autonomous football federation working without the investment or support of FIFA or UEFA. The votes in 1996 were cast by IFFHS's editorial staff, as well as experts from 89 countries spanning six continents. Since then, the votes have been now awarded by 81 experts and selected editorial offices from all of the continents. In 2020, an award for women's club coaches was introduced. The current men's recipient is Paris Saint-Germain coach Luis Enrique. The current women's recipient is Arsenal coach Renée Slegers.

== Public reception ==
The award is officially recognised by FIFA despite the IFFHS not being affiliated with them. However, as the award is usually awarded based on statistics rather than individual merits, it is not held in high regard by some football fans. Four-time winner José Mourinho once jokingly stated that the IFFHS were slow in handing over the award claiming he had not received his award from 2010 in 2012.

== Men's winners ==
The award is awarded at the end of the year. The winning coach and the runner-up in the rankings are awarded a gold and silver trophy respectively at the World Football Gala. Below is a list of the previous men's winners and runners-up since the first award in 1996.

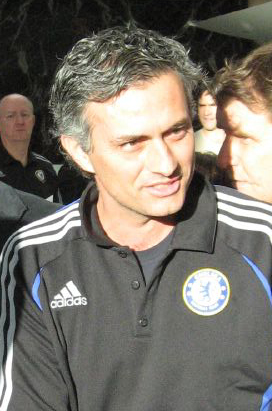
José Mourinho, 2012 Best Club Coach of the Year, and a record four-time winner of the award

=== List of winners ===
Year	Rank	Winning coach	Club(s)	Points
1996	**1st**	**(Italy) Marcello Lippi**	**(Italy) Juventus**	–
1996	2nd	(Argentina) Ramón Díaz	(Argentina) River Plate	–
1996	3rd	**(France)** Luis Fernandez	**(France)** Paris Saint-Germain	–
1997	**1st**	**(Germany) Ottmar Hitzfeld**	**(Germany) Borussia Dortmund**	**146**
1997	2nd	(Scotland) Alex Ferguson	(England) Manchester United	110
1997	3rd	(Italy) Marcello Lippi	(Italy) Juventus	87
1998	**1st**	**(Italy) Marcello Lippi**	**(Italy) Juventus**	**154**
1998	2nd	(Germany) Jupp Heynckes	(Spain) Real Madrid	134
1998	3rd	(Scotland) Alex Ferguson	(England) Manchester United	88
1999	**1st**	**(Scotland) Alex Ferguson**	**(England) Manchester United**	**225**
1999	2nd	(Sweden) Sven-Göran Eriksson	(Italy) Lazio	86
1999	3rd	(Germany) Ottmar Hitzfeld	(Germany) Bayern Munich	69
2000	**1st**	**(Argentina) Carlos Bianchi**	**(Argentina) Boca Juniors**	**137**
2000	2nd	(Argentina) Héctor Cúper	(Spain) Valencia	124
2000	3rd	(Spain) Vicente del Bosque	(Spain) Real Madrid	116
2001	**1st**	**(Germany) Ottmar Hitzfeld**	**(Germany) Bayern Munich**	**228**
2001	2nd	(France) Gérard Houllier	(England) Liverpool	125
2001	3rd	(Argentina) Carlos Bianchi	(Argentina) Boca Juniors	120
2002	**1st**	**(Spain) Vicente del Bosque**	**(Spain) Real Madrid**	**224**
2002	2nd	(France) Arsène Wenger	(England) Arsenal	136
2002	3rd	(Scotland) Alex Ferguson **(Germany)** Klaus Toppmöller	(England) Manchester United **(Germany)** Bayer Leverkusen	69
2003	**1st**	**(Argentina) Carlos Bianchi**	**(Argentina) Boca Juniors**	**173**
2003	2nd	(Italy) Carlo Ancelotti	(Italy) Milan	117
2003	3rd	(Italy) Marcello Lippi	(Italy) Juventus	70
2004	**1st**	**(Portugal) José Mourinho**	**(Portugal) Porto**	**271**
2004	2nd	(France) Arsène Wenger	(England) Arsenal	86
2004	3rd	(France) Didier Deschamps	(France) Monaco	72
2005	**1st**	**(Portugal) José Mourinho**	**(England) Chelsea**	**275**
2005	2nd	(France) Arsène Wenger	(England) Arsenal	89
2005	3rd	(Spain) Rafael Benítez	(England) Liverpool	66
2006	**1st**	**(Netherlands) Frank Rijkaard**	**(Spain) Barcelona**	**236**
2006	2nd	(Portugal) José Mourinho	(England) Chelsea	113
2006	3rd	**(Spain)** Juande Ramos	**(Spain)** Sevilla	92
2007	**1st**	**(Italy) Carlo Ancelotti**	**(Italy) Milan**	**193**
2007	2nd	(Scotland) Alex Ferguson	(England) Manchester United	134
2007	3rd	**(Spain)** Juande Ramos	**(Spain)** Sevilla	104
2008	**1st**	**(Scotland) Alex Ferguson**	**(England) Manchester United**	**264**
2008	2nd	(Netherlands) Dick Advocaat	(Russia) Zenit Saint Petersburg	144
2008	3rd	(Argentina) Edgardo Bauza	(Ecuador) LDU Quito	64
2009	**1st**	**(Spain) Pep Guardiola**	**(Spain) Barcelona**	**300**
2009	2nd	(Scotland) Alex Ferguson	(England) Manchester United	137
2009	3rd	(Portugal) José Mourinho	(Italy) Inter Milan	66
2010	**1st**	**(Portugal) José Mourinho**	**(Italy) Inter Milan** **(Spain) Real Madrid**	**294**
2010	2nd	(Spain) Pep Guardiola	(Spain) Barcelona	188
2010	3rd	(Netherlands) Louis van Gaal	(Germany) Bayern Munich	75
2011	**1st**	**(Spain) Pep Guardiola**	**(Spain) Barcelona**	**201**
2011	2nd	(Portugal) José Mourinho	(Spain) Real Madrid	112
2011	3rd	(Scotland) Alex Ferguson	(England) Manchester United	107
2012	**1st**	**(Portugal) José Mourinho**	**(Spain) Real Madrid**	**101**
2012	2nd	(Italy) Roberto Di Matteo	(England) Chelsea	99
2012	3rd	(Argentina) Diego Simeone	(Spain) Atlético Madrid	97
2013	**1st**	**(Germany) Jupp Heynckes**	**(Germany) Bayern Munich**	**216**
2013	2nd	(Germany) Jürgen Klopp	(Germany) Borussia Dortmund	101
2013	3rd	(Argentina) Diego Simeone	(Spain) Atlético Madrid	61
2014	**1st**	**(Italy) Carlo Ancelotti**	**(Spain) Real Madrid**	**169**
2014	2nd	(Argentina) Diego Simeone	(Spain) Atlético Madrid	139
2014	3rd	(Spain) Pep Guardiola	(Germany) Bayern Munich	76
2015	**1st**	**(Spain) Luis Enrique**	**(Spain) Barcelona**	**165**
2015	2nd	(Spain) Pep Guardiola	(Germany) Bayern Munich	86
2015	3rd	(Italy) Massimiliano Allegri	(Italy) Juventus	43
2016	**1st**	**(Argentina) Diego Simeone**	**(Spain) Atlético Madrid**	**113**
2016	2nd	(France) Zinedine Zidane	(Spain) Real Madrid	108
2016	3rd	(Italy) Claudio Ranieri	(England) Leicester City	86
2017	**1st**	**(France) Zinedine Zidane**	**(Spain) Real Madrid**	**326**
2017	2nd	(Italy) Massimiliano Allegri	(Italy) Juventus	70
2017	3rd	(Italy) Antonio Conte	(England) Chelsea	66
2018	**1st**	**(France) Zinedine Zidane**	**(Spain) Real Madrid**	**296**
2018	2nd	(Germany) Jürgen Klopp	(England) Liverpool	109
2018	3rd	(Spain) Pep Guardiola	(England) Manchester City	105
2019	**1st**	**(Germany) Jürgen Klopp**	**(England) Liverpool**	**369**
2019	2nd	(Spain) Pep Guardiola	(England) Manchester City	100
2019	3rd	(Netherlands) Erik ten Hag	(Netherlands) Ajax	82
2020	**1st**	**(Germany) Hansi Flick**	**(Germany) Bayern Munich**	**270**
2020	2nd	(Germany) Jürgen Klopp	(England) Liverpool	125
2020	3rd	(Germany) Julian Nagelsmann	(Germany) RB Leipzig	5
2021	**1st**	**(Germany) Thomas Tuchel**	**(England) Chelsea**	**230**
2021	2nd	(Spain) Pep Guardiola	(England) Manchester City	55
2021	3rd	(Germany) Hansi Flick	(Germany) Bayern Munich	25
2022	**1st**	**(Italy) Carlo Ancelotti**	**(Spain) Real Madrid**	**245**
2022	2nd	(Spain) Pep Guardiola	(England) Manchester City	45
2022	3rd	(Morocco) Walid Regragui	(Morocco) Wydad AC	40
2023	**1st**	**(Spain) Pep Guardiola**	**(England) Manchester City**	**281**
2023	2nd	(Italy) Carlo Ancelotti	(Spain) Real Madrid	56
2023	3rd	(Italy) Luciano Spalletti	(Italy) Napoli	53
2024	**1st**	**(Italy) Carlo Ancelotti**	**(Spain) Real Madrid**	**268**
2024	2nd	(Spain) Xabi Alonso	(Germany) Bayer Leverkusen	104
2024	3rd	(Spain) Pep Guardiola	(England) Manchester City	88
2025	**1st**	**(Spain) Luis Enrique**	**(France) Paris Saint-Germain**	**222**
2025	2nd	(Italy) Enzo Maresca	(England) Chelsea	60
2025	3rd	(Germany) Hansi Flick	(Spain) Barcelona	57

=== Statistics ===
Winners (1996–present)
Coach	Wins	Years
(Portugal) José Mourinho	4	2004, 2005, 2010, 2012
(Italy) Carlo Ancelotti	4	2007, 2014, 2022, 2024
(Spain) Pep Guardiola	3	2009, 2011, 2023
(Italy) Marcello Lippi	2	1996, 1998
(Germany) Ottmar Hitzfeld	2	1997, 2001
(Argentina) Carlos Bianchi	2	2000, 2003
(Scotland) Alex Ferguson	2	1999, 2008
(France) Zinedine Zidane	2	2017, 2018
(Spain) Luis Enrique	2	2015, 2025
(Spain) Vicente del Bosque	1	2002
(Netherlands) Frank Rijkaard	1	2006
(Germany) Jupp Heynckes	1	2013
(Argentina) Diego Simeone	1	2016
(Germany) Jürgen Klopp	1	2019
(Germany) Hansi Flick	1	2020
(Germany) Thomas Tuchel	1	2021

Wins by club
Club	Total	Coaches
(Spain) Real Madrid	8	4
(Spain) Barcelona	4	3
(Germany) Bayern Munich	3	3
(England) Chelsea	2	2
(Argentina) Boca Juniors	2	1
(Italy) Juventus	2	1
(England) Manchester United	2	1
(Spain) Atlético Madrid	1	1
(Germany) Borussia Dortmund	1	1
(Italy) Inter Milan	1	1
(England) Liverpool	1	1
(Italy) Milan	1	1
(Portugal) Porto	1	1
(England) Manchester City	1	1
(France) Paris Saint-Germain	1	1

Wins by nationality
Nationality	Total	Coaches
Germany	6	5
Italy	6	2
Spain	6	3
Portugal	4	1
Argentina	3	2
France	2	1
Scotland	2	1
Netherlands	1	1

=== Continental winners ===
Bold indicates the World's Best Man Club Coach winner.

Year	Confederation	Winner	Club(s)
2021	**UEFA**	**(Germany) Thomas Tuchel**	**(England) Chelsea**
2021	CONMEBOL	(Brazil) Renato Gaúcho	(Brazil) Flamengo
2021	CONCACAF	(Mexico) Javier Aguirre	(Mexico) Monterrey
2021	CAF	(South Africa) Pitso Mosimane	**(Egypt)** Al Ahly
2021	AFC	**(Portugal)** Leonardo Jardim	**(Saudi Arabia)** Al-Hilal
2021	OFC	**(England)** José Figueira	(New Zealand) Auckland City

=== All-time World's Best Man Coach ranking (1996–2020) ===
As of 25 February 2021

Top 10 coaches
Rank	Coach	Nationality	Points
1	**Alex Ferguson**	Scotland	245
2	José Mourinho	Portugal	226
3	Pep Guardiola	Spain	211
4	Joachim Löw	Germany	200
**5**	Arsene Wenger	**France**	**185**
6	Vicente del Bosque	Spain	175
7	Carlo Ancelotti	Italy	169
8	Marcello Lippi	Italy	156
9	Diego Simeone	Argentina	152
10	Luiz Felipe Scolari	Brazil	151

=== The World's Best Man Coach of the Decade (2001–2010) ===
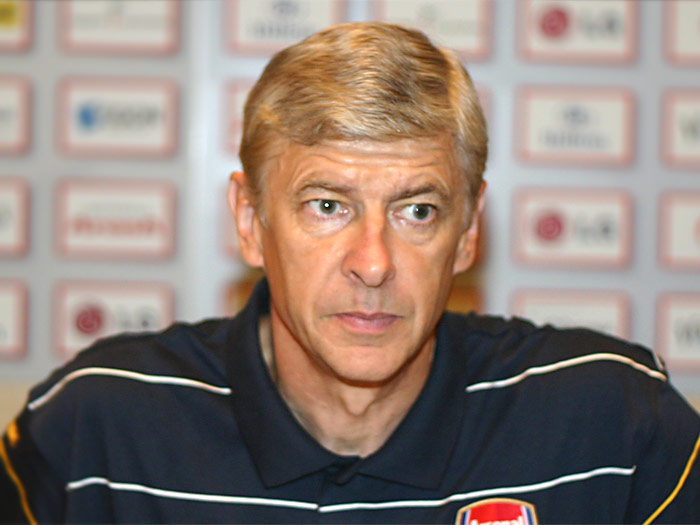
Arsenal's Arsène Wenger won the first World Coach of the Decade award

In 2011, the IFFHS awarded an additional award to coaches by combining the points awarded in the annual World's Best Club Coach awards, to the coach who had gained the most points collectively over the previous ten years to determine the best coach of the previous decade. This World Coach of the Decade award was awarded to Arsenal manager Arsène Wenger, despite the fact he had never won the annual World's Best Club Coach award.

Top 10 coaches
Rank	Coach	Nationality	Points
**1**	**Arsène Wenger**	**France**	**156**
2	Alex Ferguson	Scotland	148
3	José Mourinho	Portugal	135
4	Fabio Capello	Italy	120
5	Guus Hiddink	Netherlands	112
6	Carlo Ancelotti	Italy	108
7	Luiz Felipe Scolari	Brazil	101
8	Marcelo Bielsa	Argentina	101
9	Rafael Benítez	Spain	97
10	Marcello Lippi	Italy	88

=== The World's Best Man Club Coach of the Decade (2011–2020) ===
In 2021, Atlético Madrid's manager Diego Simeone won the World's Best Man Club Coach of the Decade 2011–2020.

Top 10 coaches
Rank	Coach	Nationality	Points
**1**	**Diego Simeone**	**Argentina**	**152**
2	Pep Guardiola	Spain	144
3	Jürgen Klopp	Germany	105
4	José Mourinho	Portugal	91
5	Massimiliano Allegri	Italy	77
6	Unai Emery	Spain	70
7	Zinedine Zidane	France	59
8	Carlo Ancelotti	Italy	57
9	Mauricio Pochettino	Argentina	56
10	Marcelo Gallardo	Argentina	56

== Women's winners ==
IFFHS World's Best Woman Club Coach
- Sport: Association football
- Awarded for: Best performing woman club coach of the calendar year
- Presented by: International Federation of Football History & Statistics

History
- First award: 2020
- Editions: 6
- First winner: (France) Jean-Luc Vasseur
- Most wins: (Spain) Jonatan Giráldez (2 awards)
- Most recent: (Netherlands) Renée Slegers (1st award)
- Website: iffhs.com/en

The award is awarded at the end of the year. Below is a list of the previous women's winners and runners-up since the first award in 2020.

=== List of winners ===
Year	Rank	Coach	Club(s)	Points
2020	**1st**	**(France) Jean-Luc Vasseur**	**(France) Lyon**	**250**
2020	2nd	(England) Emma Hayes	(England) Chelsea	50
2020	3rd	(Spain) Lluís Cortés	(Spain) Barcelona	20
2021	**1st**	**(Spain) Lluís Cortés**	**(Spain) Barcelona**	**185**
2021	2nd	(France) Sonia Bompastor	(France) Lyon	55
2021	3rd	(England) Emma Hayes	(England) Chelsea	35
2022	**1st**	**(France) Sonia Bompastor**	**(France) Lyon**	**145**
2022	2nd	(Spain) Jonatan Giráldez	(Spain) Barcelona	55
2022	3rd	(Brazil) Hoffmann Túlio	(Brazil) Palmeiras	25
2023	**1st**	**(Spain) Jonatan Giráldez**	**(Spain) Barcelona**	**180**
2023	2nd	(France) Sonia Bompastor	(France) Lyon	67
2023	3rd	(Germany) Tommy Stroot	(Germany) Wolfsburg	61
2024	**1st**	**(Spain) Jonatan Giráldez**	**(Spain) Barcelona** **(United States) Washington Spirit**	**170**
2024	2nd	(France) Sonia Bompastor	(France) Lyon (England) Chelsea	120
2024	3rd	(England) Emma Hayes	(England) Chelsea	82
2025	**1st**	**(Netherlands) Renée Slegers**	**(England) Arsenal**	**145**
2025	2nd	(Spain) Pere Romeu	(Spain) Barcelona	120
2025	3rd	(France) Sonia Bompastor	(England) Chelsea	97

=== Statistics ===
Winners (2020–present)
Coach	Wins	Years
(Spain) Jonatan Giráldez	2	2023, 2024
(France) Jean-Luc Vasseur	1	2020
(Spain) Lluís Cortés	1	2021
(France) Sonia Bompastor	1	2022
(Netherlands) Renée Slegers	1	2025

Wins by club
Club	Total	Coaches
(Spain) Barcelona	3	2
(France) Lyon	2	2
(United States) Washington Spirit	1	1
(England) Arsenal	1	1

Wins by nationality
Nationality	Total	Coaches
Spain	3	2
France	2	2
Netherlands	1	1

=== Continental winners ===
Bold indicates the World's Best Woman Club Coach winner.

Year	Confederation	Winner	Club(s)
2021	**UEFA**	**(Spain) Lluís Cortés**	**(Spain) Barcelona**
2021	CONMEBOL	**(Brazil)** Arthur Elias	**(Brazil)** Corinthians
2021	CONCACAF	**(Mexico)** Roberto Medina	**(Mexico)** Tigres UANL
2021	CAF	**(Ghana)** Yusif Basigi	**(Ghana)** Hasaacas
2021	AFC	**(Australia)** Ante Juric	(Australia) Sydney FC
2021	OFC	(Guatemala) Juan José Chang	(New Zealand) Coastal Spirit

== See also ==
- International Federation of Football History & Statistics
- IFFHS World's Best International Goal Scorer
- IFFHS World's Best Top Goal Scorer
- IFFHS World's Best National Coach
- IFFHS World's Best Goalkeeper
- IFFHS World's Best Player
- IFFHS World's Best Club
- IFFHS World Team
