= UEFA Men's Coach of the Year Award =

Football award

UEFA Men's Coach of the Year
- Sponsored by: ESM
- Presented by: UEFA
- First award: 2020
- Final award: 2023

Highlights
- Most wins: (Germany) Hansi Flick (Germany) Thomas Tuchel (Italy) Carlo Ancelotti (Spain) Pep Guardiola (1st award)
- Website: UEFA.com

The UEFA Men's Coach of the Year Award is an association football award given to the manager coaching a men's football club in Europe that is considered the best in the previous season of both club and national team competition. The award, created in 2020 by UEFA in partnership with European Sports Media (ESM) group

== Criteria ==
According to UEFA, for this award, "coaches in Europe, irrespective of nationality, [are] judged in regard to their performances over the whole season in all competitions – both domestically and internationally – at either club, or national team level."

== Voting ==
80 coaches, from the clubs that participated in the group stages of that year's UEFA Champions League and UEFA Europa League, along with 55 sports journalists selected by the European Sports Media group representing each of the UEFA national associations, provide a list of their three best-ranked coaches from one to three, with the first coach receiving five points, the second three points and the third one point. Coaches are not allowed to vote for themselves. The three coaches with the most points overall are shortlisted, and the winner is announced during the group stage draw of the next season's UEFA Champions League.

== Award history ==
=== Winners ===
Season	Coach	Team(s) managed
2019–20	(Germany) Hansi Flick	(Germany) Bayern Munich
2020–21	(Germany) Thomas Tuchel	(France) Paris Saint-Germain (England) Chelsea
2021–22	(Italy) Carlo Ancelotti	(Spain) Real Madrid
2022–23	(Spain) Pep Guardiola	(England) Manchester City

=== Finalists ===
Winner Shortlisted

==== 2019–20 ====
Rank	Coach	Points	Team(s) managed
1	(Germany) Hansi Flick	476	(Germany) Bayern Munich
2	(Germany) Jurgen Klopp	212	(England) Liverpool
3	(Germany) Julian Nagelsmann	76 (Note: Nagelsmann finished third above Tuchel after receiving a higher number of five-point votes)	(Germany) RB Leipzig
4	(Germany) Thomas Tuchel	76	(France) Paris Saint-Germain
5	(Italy) Gian Piero Gasperini	68	(Italy) Atalanta
6	(Spain) Julen Lopetegui	57	(Spain) Sevilla
7	(France) Rudi Garcia	32	(France) Lyon
8	(France) Zinedine Zidane	25	(Spain) Real Madrid
9	(Spain) Pep Guardiola	11	(England) Manchester City
10	(Italy) Antonio Conte	9	(Italy) Inter Milan

==== 2020–21 ====
Rank	Coach	Points	Team(s) managed
1	(Germany) Thomas Tuchel	378	(France) Paris Saint-Germain (England) Chelsea
2	(Italy) Roberto Mancini	292	Italy
3	(Spain) Pep Guardiola	198	(England) Manchester City
4	(Spain) Unai Emery	64	(Spain) Villarreal
5	(Argentina) Diego Simeone	29	(Spain) Atlético Madrid
6	(Italy) Antonio Conte	19	(Italy) Inter Milan
7	(England) Gareth Southgate	18	England
8	(France) Christophe Galtier	16	(France) Lille
9	(Norway) Ole Gunnar Solskjær	14	(England) Manchester United
10	(Denmark) Kasper Hjulmand	11	Denmark

==== 2021–22 ====
Rank	Coach	Points	Team(s) managed
1	(Italy) Carlo Ancelotti	526	(Spain) Real Madrid
2	(Germany) Jürgen Klopp	210	(England) Liverpool
3	(Spain) Pep Guardiola	108	(England) Manchester City
4	(Austria) Oliver Glasner	75	(Germany) Eintracht Frankfurt
5	(Spain) Unai Emery	74	(Spain) Villarreal
6	(Portugal) José Mourinho	51	(Italy) Roma

==== 2022–23 ====
Rank	Coach	Points	Team(s) managed
1	(Spain) Pep Guardiola	602	(England) Manchester City
2	(Italy) Luciano Spalletti	252	(Italy) Napoli
3	(Italy) Simone Inzaghi	84	(Italy) Inter Milan
4	(Italy) Roberto De Zerbi	70	(England) Brighton & Hove Albion
5	(Spain) Mikel Arteta	67	(England) Arsenal
6	(Croatia) Zlatko Dalić	49	Croatia
7	(Spain) José Luis Mendilibar	28	(Spain) Sevilla
8	(France) Didier Deschamps	26	France
9	(Scotland) David Moyes	22	(England) West Ham United
10	(France) Franck Haise	11	(France) Lens

== See also ==
- UEFA Women's Coach of the Year Award
- UEFA Club Football Awards
- The Best FIFA Football Coach
