= The Best FIFA Football Coach =

International football award

- Current: The Best FIFA Football Awards 2025
- First award: 2016
- Currently held by: Men's: (Spain) Luis Enrique (1st award); Women's: (Netherlands) Sarina Wiegman (5th award)

Highlights
- Most wins: Men's: (Germany) Jürgen Klopp (2 awards); Women's: (Netherlands) Sarina Wiegman (5 awards)
- Website: FIFA.com

The Best FIFA Football Coach is an association football award given annually to the men's and women's football coaches who are considered to have performed the best in the previous 12 months.

== History ==
The selection criteria for the coaches of the year is: performance and general behaviour of their teams on and off the pitch.

The votes are decided by media representatives, national team coaches, and national team captains. In October 2016, it was announced that the general public would also be allowed to vote. Each group gets 25% of the overall vote.

== The Best FIFA Men's Coach Award winners ==
Year	Rank	Coach	Team(s) managed	Votes
2016	1st	(Italy) Claudio Ranieri	(England) Leicester City	22.06%
2016	2nd	(France) Zinedine Zidane	(Spain) Real Madrid Castilla; (Spain) Real Madrid	16.56%
2016	3rd	(Portugal) Fernando Santos	Portugal	16.24%
2017	1st	(France) Zinedine Zidane	(Spain) Real Madrid	46.22%
2017	2nd	(Italy) Antonio Conte	(England) Chelsea	11.62%
2017	3rd	(Italy) Massimiliano Allegri	(Italy) Juventus	8.78%
2018	1st	(France) Didier Deschamps	France	30.52%
2018	2nd	(France) Zinedine Zidane	(Spain) Real Madrid	25.74%
2018	3rd	(Croatia) Zlatko Dalić	Croatia	11.81%
2019	1st	(Germany) Jürgen Klopp	(England) Liverpool	48
2019	2nd	(Spain) Pep Guardiola	(England) Manchester City	38
2019	3rd	(Argentina) Mauricio Pochettino	(England) Tottenham Hotspur	27
2020	1st	(Germany) Jürgen Klopp	(England) Liverpool	24 won due to more votes from national team coaches
2020	2nd	(Germany) Hansi Flick	(Germany) Bayern Munich	24
2020	3rd	(Argentina) Marcelo Bielsa	(England) Leeds United	11
2021	1st	(Germany) Thomas Tuchel	(France) Paris Saint-Germain; (England) Chelsea	28
2021	2nd	(Italy) Roberto Mancini	Italy	15
2021	3rd	(Spain) Pep Guardiola	(England) Manchester City	14
2022	1st	(Argentina) Lionel Scaloni	Argentina	28
2022	2nd	(Italy) Carlo Ancelotti	(Spain) Real Madrid	17
2022	3rd	(Spain) Pep Guardiola	(England) Manchester City	12
2023	1st	(Spain) Pep Guardiola	(England) Manchester City	28
2023	2nd	(Italy) Luciano Spalletti	(Italy) Napoli; Italy	18
2023	3rd	(Italy) Simone Inzaghi	(Italy) Inter Milan	11
2024	1st	(Italy) Carlo Ancelotti	(Spain) Real Madrid	26
2024	2nd	(Spain) Xabi Alonso	(Germany) Bayer Leverkusen	22
2024	3rd	(Spain) Pep Guardiola	(England) Manchester City	10
2025	1st	(Spain) Luis Enrique	(France) Paris Saint-Germain	28
2025	2nd	(Germany) Hansi Flick	(Spain) Barcelona	20
2025	3rd	(Netherlands) Arne Slot	(England) Liverpool	10

=== Overall total ===
Rank	Coach	First place	Second place	Third place	Team(s) managed
1	(Germany) Jürgen Klopp	2	0	0	(England) Liverpool
2	(France) Zinedine Zidane	1	2	0	(Spain) Real Madrid Castilla; (Spain) Real Madrid
3	(Spain) Pep Guardiola	1	1	3	(England) Manchester City
4	(Italy) Carlo Ancelotti	1	1	0	(Spain) Real Madrid
5	(Argentina) Lionel Scaloni	1	0	0	Argentina
5	(Spain) Luis Enrique	1	0	0	(France) Paris Saint-Germain
5	(France) Didier Deschamps	1	0	0	France
5	(Italy) Claudio Ranieri	1	0	0	(England) Leicester City
5	(Germany) Thomas Tuchel	1	0	0	(France) Paris Saint-Germain; (England) Chelsea
10	(Germany) Hansi Flick	0	2	0	(Germany) Bayern Munich (Spain) Barcelona
11	(Spain) Xabi Alonso	0	1	0	(Germany) Bayer Leverkusen
11	(Italy) Antonio Conte	0	1	0	(England) Chelsea
11	(Italy) Roberto Mancini	0	1	0	Italy
11	(Italy) Luciano Spalletti	0	1	0	(Italy) Napoli; Italy
15	(Portugal) Fernando Santos	0	0	1	Portugal
15	(Italy) Massimiliano Allegri	0	0	1	(Italy) Juventus
15	(Croatia) Zlatko Dalić	0	0	1	Croatia
15	(Argentina) Mauricio Pochettino	0	0	1	(England) Tottenham Hotspur
15	(Argentina) Marcelo Bielsa	0	0	1	(England) Leeds United
15	(Italy) Simone Inzaghi	0	0	1	(Italy) Inter Milan
15	(Netherlands) Arne Slot	0	0	1	(England) Liverpool

== The Best FIFA Women's Coach Award winners ==
Year	Rank	Coach	Team(s) managed	Votes
2016	1st	(Germany) Silvia Neid	Germany	29.99%
2016	2nd	(England) Jill Ellis	United States	16.68%
2016	3rd	(Sweden) Pia Sundhage	Sweden	16.47%
2017	1st	(Netherlands) Sarina Wiegman	Netherlands	36.24%
2017	2nd	(Denmark) Nils Nielsen	Denmark	12.64%
2017	3rd	(France) Gerard Precheur	(France) Lyon	9.37%
2018	1st	(France) Reynald Pedros	(France) Lyon	23.15%
2018	2nd	(Netherlands) Sarina Wiegman	Netherlands	15.31%
2018	3rd	(Japan) Asako Takakura	Japan	12.80%
2019	1st	(England) Jill Ellis	United States	48
2019	2nd	(Netherlands) Sarina Wiegman	Netherlands	40
2019	3rd	(England) Phil Neville	England	31
2020	1st	(Netherlands) Sarina Wiegman	Netherlands	26
2020	2nd	(France) Jean-Luc Vasseur	(France) Lyon	20
2020	3rd	(England) Emma Hayes	(England) Chelsea	12
2021	1st	(England) Emma Hayes	(England) Chelsea	22
2021	2nd	(Spain) Lluís Cortés	(Spain) Barcelona; Ukraine	19
2021	3rd	(Netherlands) Sarina Wiegman	Netherlands; England	14
2022	1st	(Netherlands) Sarina Wiegman	England	28
2022	2nd	(France) Sonia Bompastor	(France) Lyon	18
2022	3rd	(Sweden) Pia Sundhage	Brazil	10
2023	1st	(Netherlands) Sarina Wiegman	England	28
2023	2nd	(England) Emma Hayes	(England) Chelsea	18
2023	3rd	(Spain) Jonatan Giraldez	(Spain) Barcelona	14
2024	1st	(England) Emma Hayes	(England) Chelsea; United States	23
2024	2nd	(Spain) Jonatan Giráldez	(Spain) Barcelona; (United States) Washington Spirit	20
2024	3rd	(Brazil) Arthur Elias	(Brazil) Corinthians; Brazil	13
2025	1st	(Netherlands) Sarina Wiegman	England	26
2025	2nd	(France) Sonia Bompastor	(England) Chelsea	22
2025	3rd	(Netherlands) Renée Slegers	(England) Arsenal	11

=== Overall total ===
Rank	Coach	First place	Second place	Third place	Team(s) managed
1	(Netherlands) Sarina Wiegman	5	2	1	Netherlands; England
2	(England) Emma Hayes	2	1	1	(England) Chelsea; United States
3	(England) Jill Ellis	1	1	0	United States
4	(Germany) Silvia Neid	1	0	0	Germany
4	(France) Reynald Pedros	1	0	0	(France) Lyon
6	(Spain) Jonatan Giráldez	0	1	1	(Spain) Barcelona; (United States) Washington Spirit
7	(France) Sonia Bompastor	0	2	0	(France) Lyon (England) Chelsea
8	(Spain) Lluís Cortés	0	1	0	(Spain) Barcelona; Ukraine
8	(Denmark) Nils Nielsen	0	1	0	Denmark
8	(France) Jean-Luc Vasseur	0	1	0	(France) Lyon
11	(Sweden) Pia Sundhage	0	0	2	Sweden
12	(France) Gerard Precheur	0	0	1	(France) Lyon
12	(Japan) Asako Takakura	0	0	1	Japan
12	(England) Phil Neville	0	0	1	England
12	(Brazil) Arthur Elias	0	0	1	(Brazil) Corinthians; Brazil
12	(Netherlands) Renée Slegers	0	0	1	(England) Arsenal

== See also ==
- List of sports awards honoring women
- The Best FIFA Football Awards
- FIFA World Coach of the Year (2010–2015)
