= European Sports Media =

Association football-related publications in Europe

- Abbreviation: ESM
- Formation: 9 June 1989; 37 years ago
- Founded at: Barcelona, Spain
- Type: Football-based journalistic body
- Region served: Europe (UEFA)
- Members: 14 magazines
- Website: www.eusm.eu
- Formerly called: European Sports Magazines

The European Sports Media (ESM), formerly European Sports Magazines, is an association of football-related publications in Europe.

== Members ==
European Sports Media was established in 1989 as an international body for football journalism. Its nine founding members were: A Bola (Portuguese), Don Balón (Spanish), Sport/Foot Magazine (Belgium), La Gazzetta dello Sport (Italian), kicker (German), Onze Mondial (French), Sport (Switzerland), Voetbal International (Dutch), World Soccer (English). ESM membership has varied over time. Former members also include France Football.

=== Current members ===
- (Portugal) A Bola
- (Turkey) Fanatik
- (Netherlands) ELF Voetbal
- (Germany) Frankfurter Allgemeine Zeitung
- (Italy) La Gazzetta dello Sport
- (Germany) kicker
- (Spain) Marca
- (Hungary) nemzeti sport
- (France) So Foot
- (Russia) Sport Express
- (Belgium) Sport Magazine
- (Netherlands) telesport
- (Denmark) Tipsbladet
- (England) World Soccer

== Awards ==
ESM presents the following awards:

- European Golden Shoe. Since the 1996–97 season, ESM annually rewards Europe's most prolific striker with the European Golden Shoe.
- UEFA Men's Player of the Year Award & UEFA Women's Player of the Year Award. Since 2011, in partnership with UEFA, ESM handles the voting and administration for the UEFA Best Men's Player and Women's Player in Europe Awards, which is awarded annually to the outstanding men's and women's players of the European season.
- UEFA Men's Coach of the Year Award & UEFA Women's Coach of the Year Award. Since 2020, in partnership with UEFA, ESM handles the voting and administration for the UEFA Best Men's Coach and Women's Coach in Europe Awards, which is awarded annually to the outstanding men's and women's coaches of the European season.
- ESM Team of the Season. After selecting a Team of the Season for 1994–95, ESM instituted the monthly ESM 11. Each of its members selects the 11 best players in the European leagues each month from September to May. The players who most often appear in those teams are elected into the ESM Team of the Season.

== ESM Team of the Season ==
=== 1990s ===
Season	Goalkeeper	Defenders	Midfielders	Forwards
1994–95	(Portugal) Vítor Baía	(Italy) Paolo Maldini (Germany) Matthias Sammer (Netherlands) Frank Rijkaard (Netherlands) Danny Blind	(Italy) Gianfranco Zola (Finland) Jari Litmanen (Denmark) Michael Laudrup	(Chile) Iván Zamorano (England) Alan Shearer (Germany) Jürgen Klinsmann
1995–96	(Netherlands) Edwin van der Sar	(Italy) Paolo Maldini (Netherlands) Frank de Boer (France) Laurent Blanc (Netherlands) Danny Blind	(Italy) Alessandro Del Piero (Brazil) Raí (Finland) Jari Litmanen (Germany) Mehmet Scholl	(Liberia) George Weah (France) Eric Cantona
1996–97	(Italy) Angelo Peruzzi	(Brazil) Roberto Carlos (Spain) Fernando Hierro (Italy) Ciro Ferrara (France) Jocelyn Angloma	(Spain) Raúl (Italy) Alessandro Del Piero (Netherlands) Clarence Seedorf (Spain) Luis Enrique	(Brazil) Ronaldo (Croatia) Davor Šuker
1997–98	(Italy) Angelo Peruzzi	(Brazil) Roberto Carlos (Spain) Fernando Hierro (France) Laurent Blanc (England) Gary Neville	(Italy) Alessandro Del Piero (France) Zinedine Zidane (Argentina) Fernando Redondo (Portugal) Luís Figo	(Brazil) Ronaldo (Italy) Christian Vieri
1998–99	(Argentina) Carlos Roa	(France) Bixente Lizarazu (Netherlands) Jaap Stam (France) Laurent Blanc (France) Lilian Thuram	(Brazil) Rivaldo (Federal Republic of Yugoslavia) Siniša Mihajlović (Germany) Stefan Effenberg (England) David Beckham	(Spain) Raúl (Argentina) Gabriel Batistuta
1999–2000	(Germany) Oliver Kahn	(Brazil) Roberto Carlos (Italy) Paolo Maldini (Federal Republic of Yugoslavia) Siniša Mihajlović (France) Jocelyn Angloma	(Brazil) Rivaldo (Argentina) Juan Sebastián Verón (Republic of Ireland) Roy Keane (Portugal) Luís Figo	(Spain) Raúl (Ukraine) Andriy Shevchenko

=== 2000s ===
Season	Goalkeeper	Defenders	Midfielders	Forwards
2000–01	(Germany) Oliver Kahn	(Brazil) Roberto Carlos (Finland) Sami Hyypiä (Italy) Alessandro Nesta (France) Jocelyn Angloma	(Czech Republic) Pavel Nedvěd (Italy) Francesco Totti (Germany) Mehmet Scholl (Spain) Gaizka Mendieta	(England) Michael Owen (Argentina) Hernán Crespo
2001–02	(Italy) Francesco Toldo	(Brazil) Roberto Carlos (Argentina) Walter Samuel (Brazil) Lúcio (Spain) Carles Puyol	(Sweden) Freddie Ljungberg (France) Zinedine Zidane (Germany) Michael Ballack (Spain) Rubén Baraja	(Netherlands) Ruud van Nistelrooy (Italy) Christian Vieri
2002–03	(Italy) Gianluigi Buffon	(Italy) Paolo Maldini (Belgium) Daniel Van Buyten (Spain) Carles Puyol (France) Lilian Thuram	(Brazil) Roberto Carlos (Czech Republic) Pavel Nedvěd (France) Zinedine Zidane	(Italy) Christian Vieri (Federal Republic of Yugoslavia) Mateja Kežman (Netherlands) Roy Makaay
2003–04	(Germany) Timo Hildebrand	(Brazil) Roberto Carlos (Argentina) Walter Samuel (Argentina) Roberto Ayala (Portugal) Paulo Ferreira	(Brazil) Ronaldinho (Italy) Francesco Totti (France) Zinedine Zidane (France) Ludovic Giuly	(Ukraine) Andriy Shevchenko (France) Thierry Henry
2004–05	(Czech Republic) Petr Čech	(Italy) Fabio Cannavaro (England) John Terry (Spain) Carles Puyol	(England) Frank Lampard (Netherlands) Mark van Bommel (Portugal) Deco (Brazil) Ronaldinho	(Netherlands) Arjen Robben (Cameroon) Samuel Eto'o (Ukraine) Andriy Shevchenko
2005–06	(Czech Republic) Petr Čech	(Spain) Carles Puyol (Brazil) Lúcio (Brazil) Cris	(Brazil) Ronaldinho (England) Frank Lampard (Argentina) Esteban Cambiasso (Brazil) Juninho	(Argentina) Lionel Messi (Cameroon) Samuel Eto'o (Italy) Luca Toni
2006–07	(France) Grégory Coupet	(Italy) Marco Materazzi (Serbia) Nemanja Vidić (Brazil) Dani Alves	(Serbia) Dejan Stanković (Italy) Francesco Totti (Brazil) Juninho (Portugal) Cristiano Ronaldo	(Sweden) Zlatan Ibrahimović (Ivory Coast) Didier Drogba (Mali) Frédéric Kanouté
2007–08	(Spain) Iker Casillas	(Spain) Sergio Ramos (Italy) Christian Panucci (England) Rio Ferdinand (France) William Gallas	(Portugal) Cristiano Ronaldo (Spain) Cesc Fàbregas (France) Franck Ribéry	(Argentina) Lionel Messi (Sweden) Zlatan Ibrahimović (Spain) Fernando Torres
2008–09	(Netherlands) Edwin van der Sar	(Brazil) Dani Alves (England) John Terry (Serbia) Nemanja Vidić (Brazil) Maicon	(Argentina) Lionel Messi (Spain) Xavi (England) Steven Gerrard	(Bosnia and Herzegovina) Vedad Ibišević (Cameroon) Samuel Eto'o (Brazil) Grafite
2009–10	(Brazil) Júlio César	(England) John Terry (Brazil) Lúcio (Brazil) Maicon	(Netherlands) Wesley Sneijder (Spain) Cesc Fàbregas (England) Frank Lampard (Brazil) Dani Alves	(Argentina) Lionel Messi (England) Wayne Rooney (Netherlands) Arjen Robben

=== 2010s ===
Season	Goalkeeper	Defenders	Midfielders	Forwards
2010–11	(Spain) Víctor Valdés	(Brazil) Dani Alves (Germany) Mats Hummels (Serbia) Nemanja Vidić (Spain) Gerard Piqué	(Spain) Xavi (Spain) Andrés Iniesta (Turkey) Nuri Şahin	(Portugal) Cristiano Ronaldo (Cameroon) Samuel Eto'o (Argentina) Lionel Messi
2011–12	(Germany) Manuel Neuer	(Belgium) Vincent Kompany (Germany) Mats Hummels (Spain) Sergio Ramos (Brazil) Dani Alves	(Spain) Xavi (Japan) Shinji Kagawa (Italy) Andrea Pirlo	(Portugal) Cristiano Ronaldo (Netherlands) Robin van Persie (Argentina) Lionel Messi
2012–13	(Germany) Manuel Neuer	(Italy) Giorgio Chiellini (Brazil) Dante (Germany) Philipp Lahm	(Germany) Bastian Schweinsteiger (Germany) Thomas Müller (Germany) İlkay Gündoğan	(Portugal) Cristiano Ronaldo (Argentina) Lionel Messi (Sweden) Zlatan Ibrahimović (Wales) Gareth Bale
2013–14	(Belgium) Thibaut Courtois	(Austria) David Alaba (Portugal) Pepe (Spain) Gerard Piqué (Morocco) Medhi Benatia	(Germany) Philipp Lahm (Ivory Coast) Yaya Touré (Chile) Arturo Vidal	(Portugal) Cristiano Ronaldo (Uruguay) Luis Suárez (Sweden) Zlatan Ibrahimović
2014–15	(Germany) Manuel Neuer	(Serbia) Branislav Ivanović (Italy) Giorgio Chiellini (Spain) Gerard Piqué (Spain) Sergio Ramos	(Netherlands) Arjen Robben (Belgium) Eden Hazard (Spain) Cesc Fàbregas	(Portugal) Cristiano Ronaldo (Uruguay) Luis Suárez (Argentina) Lionel Messi
2015–16	(Costa Rica) Keylor Navas	(Brazil) Marcelo (Uruguay) Diego Godín (Spain) Gerard Piqué (Brazil) Filipe Luís	(France) Paul Pogba (Argentina) Ángel Di María (France) N'Golo Kanté	(Uruguay) Luis Suárez (Argentina) Gonzalo Higuaín (Argentina) Lionel Messi
2016–17	(Italy) Gianluigi Buffon	(Brazil) Marcelo (Italy) Leonardo Bonucci (Brazil) David Luiz (Spain) Sergio Ramos	(France) N'Golo Kanté (Spain) Thiago (Argentina) Paulo Dybala	(Portugal) Cristiano Ronaldo (Uruguay) Edinson Cavani (Argentina) Lionel Messi
2017–18	(Germany) Marc-André ter Stegen	(Spain) Jordi Alba (France) Samuel Umtiti (Argentina) Nicolás Otamendi (Italy) Giorgio Chiellini	(Spain) David Silva (Spain) Andrés Iniesta (Belgium) Kevin De Bruyne	(Brazil) Neymar (Argentina) Lionel Messi (Egypt) Mohamed Salah
2018–19	(Germany) Marc-André ter Stegen	(Spain) Jordi Alba (Spain) Gerard Piqué (Netherlands) Virgil Van Dijk (Germany) Joshua Kimmich	(Germany) Marco Reus (France) Paul Pogba (Belgium) Eden Hazard	(Portugal) Cristiano Ronaldo (Senegal) Sadio Mané (Argentina) Lionel Messi
2019–20	(Germany) Marc-André ter Stegen	(Scotland) Andy Robertson (France) Dayot Upamecano (Netherlands) Virgil Van Dijk (England) Trent Alexander-Arnold	(Argentina) Ángel Di María (England) Jordan Henderson (Belgium) Kevin De Bruyne	(Norway) Erling Haaland (Poland) Robert Lewandowski (Argentina) Lionel Messi

=== 2020s ===
Season	Goalkeeper	Defenders	Midfielders	Forwards
2020–21	(Slovenia) Jan Oblak	(Portugal) João Cancelo (Portugal) Rúben Dias (England) John Stones (Morocco) Achraf Hakimi	(Belgium) Kevin De Bruyne (Germany) İlkay Gündoğan (Portugal) Bruno Fernandes	(Argentina) Lionel Messi (Poland) Robert Lewandowski (France) Karim Benzema
2021–22	(Belgium) Thibaut Courtois	(Portugal) João Cancelo (Germany) Antonio Rüdiger (Netherlands) Virgil van Dijk (England) Trent Alexander-Arnold	(Portugal) Bernardo Silva (Croatia) Luka Modrić (Belgium) Kevin De Bruyne	(France) Karim Benzema (Poland) Robert Lewandowski (Egypt) Mohamed Salah
2022–23	(Germany) Marc-André ter Stegen	(France) Théo Hernandez (South Korea) Kim Min-jae (Brazil) Éder Militão (Italy) Giovanni Di Lorenzo	(Belgium) Kevin De Bruyne (Norway) Martin Ødegaard	(France) Kylian Mbappé (Norway) Erling Haaland (Nigeria) Victor Osimhen (Argentina) Lionel Messi
2023–24	(Switzerland) Yann Sommer	(Spain) Álex Grimaldo (Netherlands) Virgil van Dijk (Germany) Antonio Rüdiger (Spain) Dani Carvajal	(Brazil) Vinícius Júnior (England) Jude Bellingham (Germany) Florian Wirtz	(France) Kylian Mbappé (England) Harry Kane (Argentina) Lautaro Martínez
2024–25	(Italy) Gianluigi Donnarumma	(Morocco) Achraf Hakimi (Netherlands) Virgil van Dijk (Germany) Antonio Rüdiger (England) Trent Alexander-Arnold	(England) Cole Palmer (Scotland) Scott McTominay (Spain) Lamine Yamal	(France) Kylian Mbappé (Poland) Robert Lewandowski (Egypt) Mohamed Salah

=== By player ===
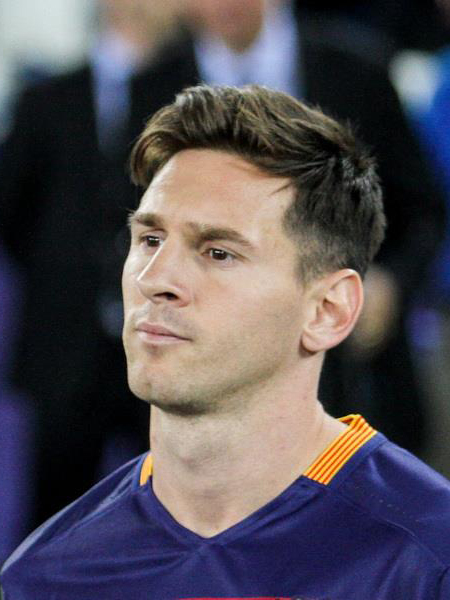
Lionel Messi with 15 selections is the all-time record appearance maker of ESM's Team of the Season.

Wins	Player	First	Last
15	(Argentina) Lionel Messi	2005–06	2022–23
9	(Portugal) Cristiano Ronaldo	2006–07	2018–19
7	(Brazil) Roberto Carlos	1996–97	2003–04
5	(Brazil) Dani Alves	2006–07	2011–12
5	(Spain) Gerard Piqué	2010–11	2018–19
5	(Belgium) Kevin De Bruyne	2017–18	2022–23
5	(Netherlands) Virgil van Dijk	2018–19	2024–25
4	(Italy) Paolo Maldini	1994–95	2002–03
4	(France) Zinedine Zidane	1997–98	2003–04
4	(Spain) Carles Puyol	2001–02	2005–06
4	(Cameroon) Samuel Eto'o	2004–05	2010–11
4	(Sweden) Zlatan Ibrahimović	2006–07	2013–14
4	(Spain) Sergio Ramos	2007–08	2016–17
4	(Germany) Marc-André ter Stegen	2017–18	2022–23
4	(Poland) Robert Lewandowski	2019–20	2024–25
