= Sarina Wiegman =

Dutch footballer and manager (born 1969)

Sarina Wiegman DBE
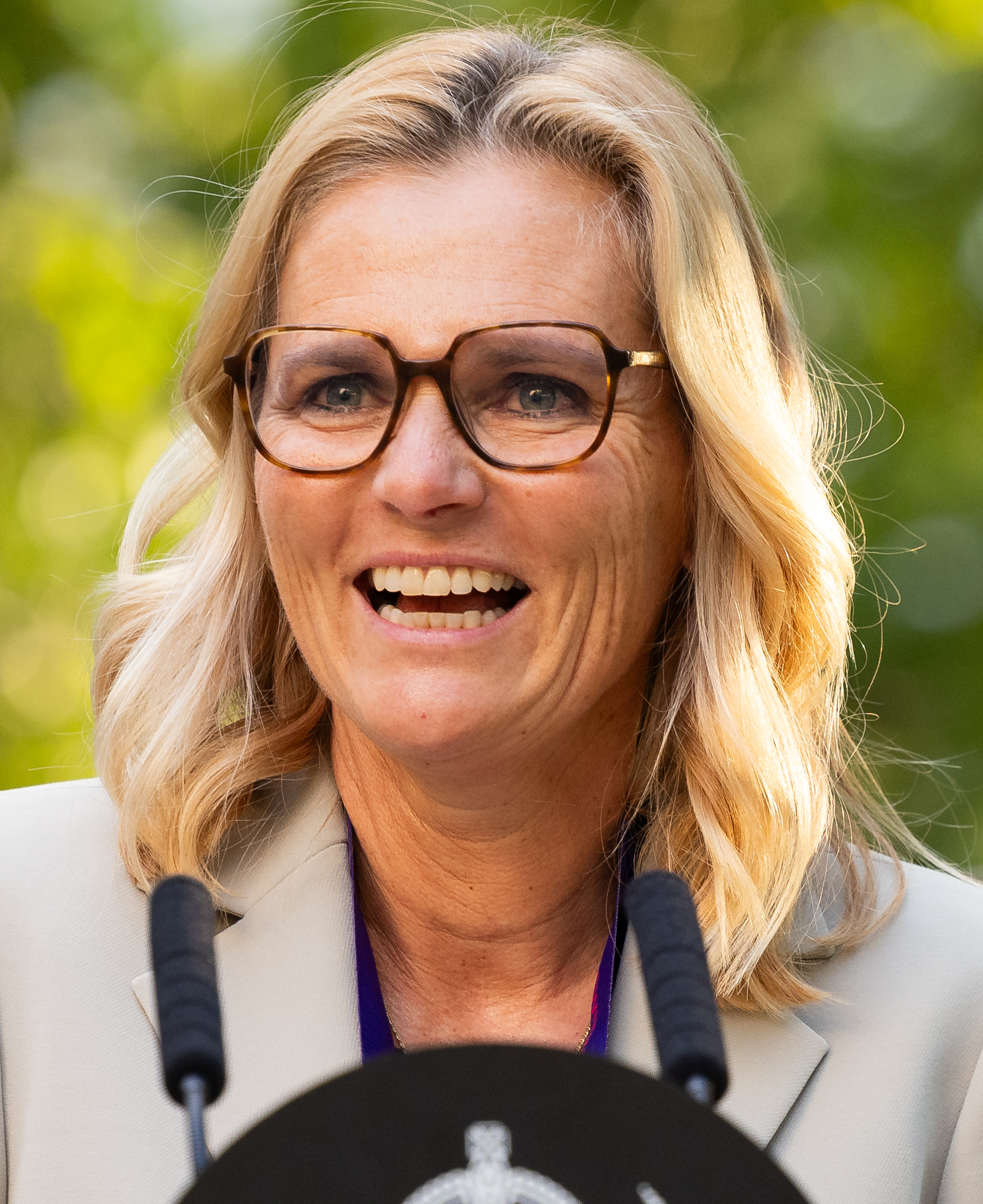
- Wiegman in 2025

Personal information
- Full name: Sarina Petronella Wiegman
- Date of birth: 26 October 1969 (age 57)
- Place of birth: The Hague, Netherlands
- Positions: Central midfielder; defender

Team information
- Current team: England (head coach)

Youth career
- GSC ESDO
- HSV Celeritas
- 1987–1988: KFC '71

College career
| Years | Team | Apps | (Gls) |
| 1989–1990 | North Carolina Tar Heels | 24 | (4) |

Senior career*
| Years | Team | Apps | (Gls) |
| 1994–2003 | Ter Leede | | |

International career
| 1987–2001 | Netherlands | 99 | (3) |

Managerial career
- 2006–2007: Ter Leede
- 2007–2014: ADO Den Haag
- 2015: Netherlands (interim)
- 2016–2021: Netherlands
- 2021–: England
Medal record
Women's football
Representing Netherlands (manager)
UEFA Women's Championship
| Winner | 2017 Netherlands |
FIFA Women's World Cup
| Runner-up | 2019 France |
Representing England (manager)
UEFA Women's Championship
| Winner | 2022 England |
| Winner | 2025 Switzerland |
UEFA–CONMEBOL Finalissima
| Winner | 2023 England |
FIFA Women's World Cup
| Runner-up | 2023 Australia and New Zealand |
- * Club domestic league appearances and goals

Sarina Petronella Wiegman DBE (Dutch pronunciation: [saːˈrinaː peːtroːˈnɛlaː ˈʋixmɑn]; born 26 October 1969), also known as Sarina Wiegman-Glotzbach, is a Dutch football manager and former player who has been the manager of the England women's national team since September 2021. She is the first-ever men's or women's manager to reach five consecutive major international tournament finals.

In her playing career, Wiegman started out as a central midfielder before moving to defence. In 1989, she attended the University of North Carolina at Chapel Hill in the United States, where she played for the North Carolina Tar Heels women's soccer team. Returning to the Netherlands, she joined the women's team of Ter Leede in addition to her job as a physical education teacher. With Ter Leede, she won the Dutch championship and the KNVB Cup once.

Wiegman represented the Netherlands from 1987 to 2001. Although she was capped 104 times for her country (which was initially recognised by the KNVB), caps won against non-FIFA-affiliated opponents resulted in her official cap total standing of 99.

After retiring in 2003, Wiegman began her coaching career with the women's teams of Ter Leede and ADO Den Haag. In 2014, she became the assistant national coach of the Dutch women's team. After being appointed as the head coach of the Dutch national team, Wiegman led them to victory at the UEFA Women's Euro 2017. Two years later, the team became runners-up of the 2019 FIFA Women's World Cup.

In August 2020, it was announced that Wiegman would manage the England women's national team from September 2021 following the end of Phil Neville's contract. She remained manager of the Netherlands for the Olympics, hoping to bring home a medal at the 2020 Olympics, but the Netherlands were eliminated at the quarter-final stage. She then became the England manager and led the Lionesses to victory at the UEFA Women's Euro 2022 on home soil. It was the first trophy for an English senior team of either gender since the men's team won the 1966 FIFA World Cup. Wiegman won a third successive European title coaching England to a win at the UEFA Women's Euro 2025.

== Early and personal life ==
Wiegman was born on 26 October 1969 in The Hague and started playing football on the streets at an early age. At the age of six, she joined ESDO from Wassenaar, where she played alongside boys. She also played for local side HSV Celeritas, where she was able to join the women's team. She is married to Dutch football coach Marten Glotzbach and they have two daughters, Sacha and Lauren.

One of her favourite music artists is Burna Boy.

== Playing career ==
In 1987, Wiegman joined KFC '71, where she won the KNVB Cup in the same year.

In 1988, while in China for the 1988 FIFA Women's Invitation Tournament, she met USWNT head coach Anson Dorrance, who invited her to come and study at the University of North Carolina at Chapel Hill and play for the North Carolina Tar Heels women's soccer team, which she did in 1989. At North Carolina, Wiegman played alongside such players as Mia Hamm, Kristine Lilly and Carla Overbeck. They became NCAA champions in 1989.

Wiegman later described the team quality and working conditions as being "of the highest level," which made for a stark contrast with the situation in the Netherlands when she returned there after one year. Here, all women's players had to work aside from football. Wiegman became a physical education teacher at the secondary school Segbroek College in The Hague, Netherlands, a job she would keep for the rest of her playing career.

In 1994, Wiegman joined Ter Leede, where she would win two Dutch championships (2001 and 2003) and one KNVB Cup (2001). In 2003, she retired after becoming pregnant with her second child.

== International career ==
Wiegman officially played 99 times for the Netherlands, scoring three goals, between 1987 and 2001. She also captained the team.

In 1986, at the age of 16, Wiegman was first selected for the Netherlands. On 23 May 1987, at the age of 17, she made her debut in an away match against Norway, which was Dick Advocaat's only match in charge of the Netherlands Women. She played at the 1988 FIFA Women's Invitation Tournament, where the Netherlands reached the quarter-finals. Wiegman also helped the Netherlands reach the quarter-finals of the 1989, 1991 and 1993 European Championships, although they never reached the final tournament of an official World Cup or European Championship.

On 9 April 2001, Wiegman gained her 100th cap in a home friendly against Denmark, becoming the first Dutch footballer to do so. Two days later, she was honoured with a shield awarded by the men's head coach Louis van Gaal. During his speech, he said: "I have a lot of respect for Sarina. For the men, everything is arranged. Here, this is much more difficult."

Wiegman played her final international game on 14 June 2001, a 2–0 away defeat against the Czech Republic. It was later revealed that five of her caps were against non-FIFA affiliated opponents, so her official cap total now stands at 99.

== Managerial career ==
=== Ter Leede ===
On 24 January 2006, it was announced that Wiegman would become manager of Ter Leede. With the team, she won the Dutch championship and the KNVB Cup in 2007.

=== ADO Den Haag Women ===
In the summer of 2007, Wiegman became manager of the women's team of ADO Den Haag, who would be competing in the newly established Women's Eredivisie. In 2012, she led ADO to the Eredivisie title and KNVB Cup. In 2013, ADO were once again victorious in the KNVB Cup.

=== Netherlands Women ===
==== Assistant coach ====
On 1 August 2014, Wiegman left ADO to become assistant coach of the Netherlands women's national football team, as well as coordinator of the women's national under-19 team. On 27 March 2015, it was announced that Wiegman would be attending the KNVB course to obtain a coaching licence, becoming only the third woman to do so, after Vera Pauw and Hesterine de Reus. On 2 July 2015, it was announced that she would have an internship at Sparta Rotterdam.

On 1 August 2015, following Roger Reijners' dismissal as head coach of the Netherlands Women, Wiegman was appointed as interim head coach. This lasted until 1 October, when Arjan van der Laan assumed his duties as the new head coach. Wiegman subsequently became assistant coach again.

On 31 July 2016, Wiegman received her UEFA Pro coaching licence, having completed the Dutch Football Association's coaching course and a one-year internship at Sparta Rotterdam. In an interview with the KNVB, she said that having seen first-hand the high level of professionalism of men's football in the Netherlands, she hoped to help bring women's football in the Netherlands to the same level.

On 3 October 2016, it was announced that Wiegman would become temporary assistant of Ole Tobiasen at Jong Sparta Rotterdam (who appear in the 2016–17 Tweede Divisie), in addition to her work as Netherlands Women assistant. In doing so, she became the first female coach at a Dutch professional football organisation.

==== Head coach ====
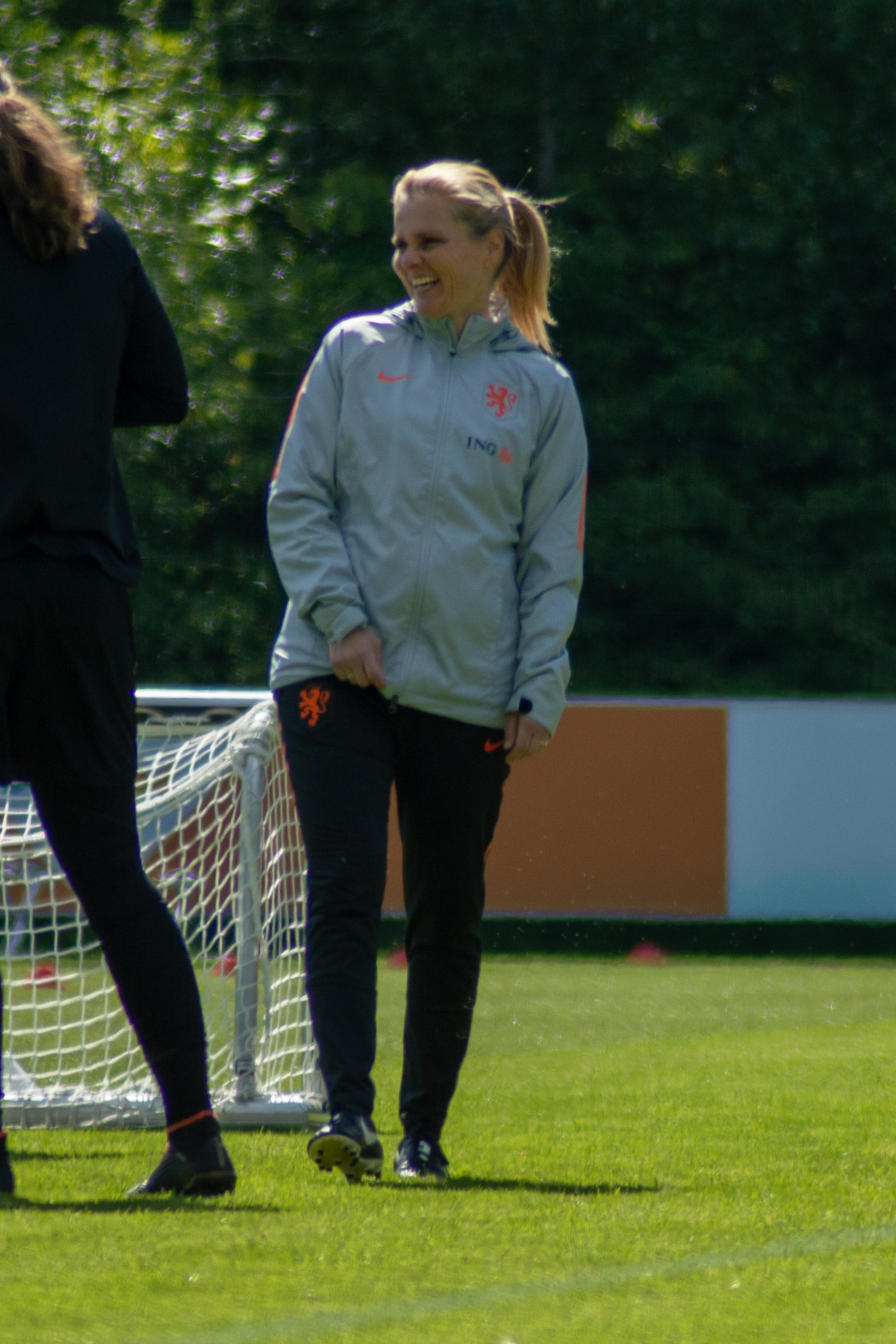
Wiegman as Netherlands coach in 2019

On 23 December 2016, Van der Laan was dismissed by the KNVB and Wiegman was once again appointed interim head coach of the Netherlands Women. On 13 January 2017, the KNVB appointed Wiegman as head coach on a permanent basis. At the same time, Foppe de Haan was appointed as her assistant.

Wiegman was appointed head coach six months before the start of the UEFA Women's Euro 2017, for which the Netherlands had automatically qualified as hosts. However, the team had lost four out of their previous five friendly matches, and morale was low. Wiegman subsequently worked on improving players' confidence and on a change in playing style to more attacking football.

At the European Championship, the Netherlands won every match, culminating in a 4–2 victory over Denmark in the final. The team also received praise for their attractive playing style. The win signified the Netherlands Women's first European Championship title and first ever major honour in women's football. Wiegman became the second Dutch coach to lead the national team to a major honour, after Rinus Michels at the men's UEFA Euro 1988.

On 23 October 2017, Wiegman was awarded The Best FIFA Women's Coach title at that year's The Best FIFA Football Awards ceremony, ahead of Denmark coach Nils Nielsen and Lyon coach Gérard Prêcheur. Two days later, she was awarded as a Knight of the Order of Orange-Nassau at a ceremony which saw the entire European Championship-winning team receive the same honour.

After securing qualification for the 2019 FIFA Women's World Cup, Wiegman led the Netherlands to the final of the tournament, in which they were defeated 0–2 by the United States. The team again received praise for their style of play on the way to the final. On 9 July 2019, it was announced that a likeness of Wiegman would be added to the statue garden of the Dutch Football Association, KNVB, for her contributions to Dutch football. She was the first woman to receive this honour.

=== England Women ===
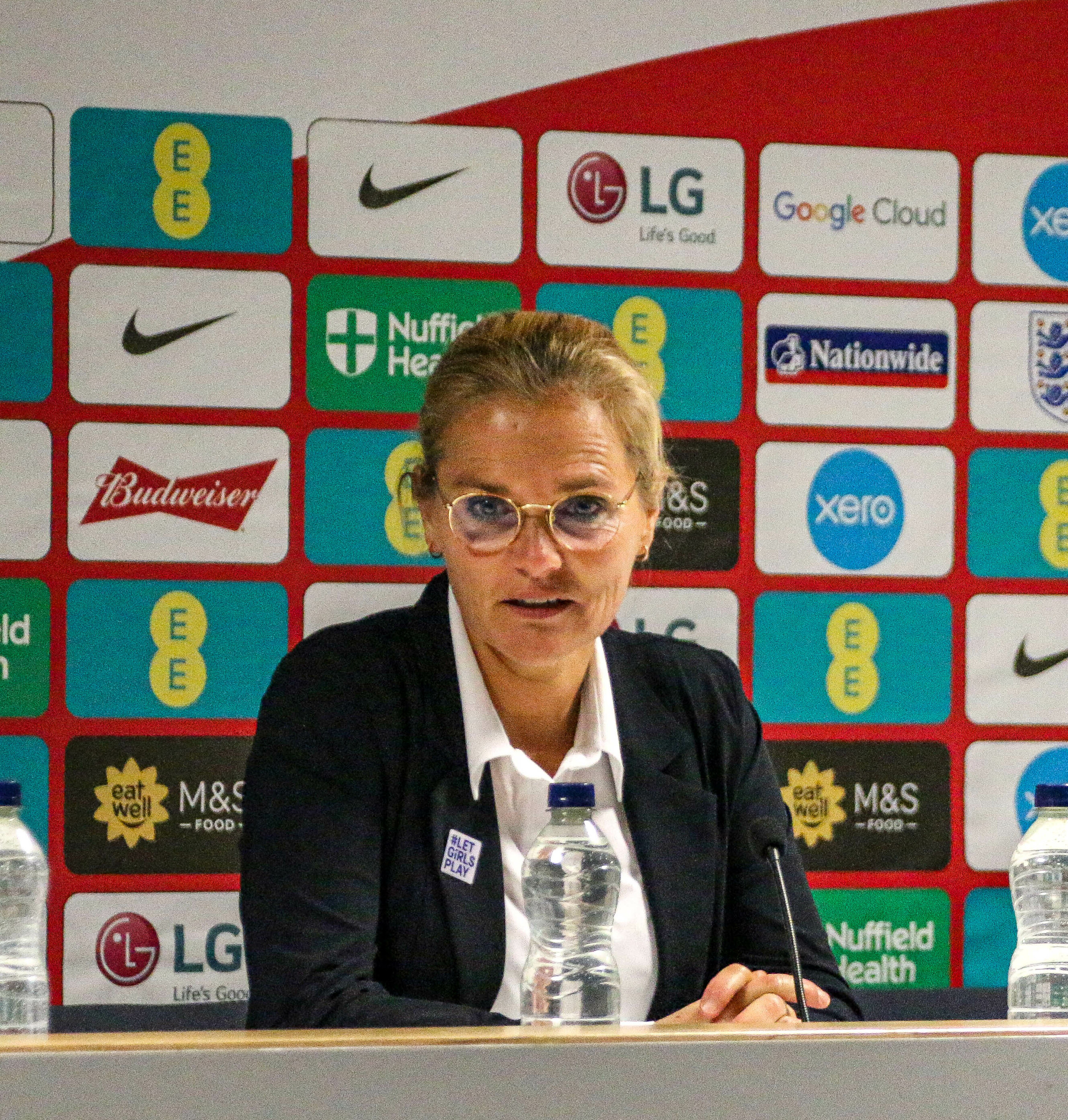
Wiegman with England in 2022

In August 2020, The Football Association announced that Wiegman had signed a four-year contract and would take the job of manager of the England women's national football team, starting in September 2021, taking over from Phil Neville. Her appointment made her the first non-British permanent Lionesses manager. After Neville resigned before his tenure was over, Norwegian Hege Riise assumed the role on an interim basis in January 2021 until Wiegman could take over. Wiegman's first game in charge was an 8–0 win against North Macedonia to begin 2023 World Cup qualification. On 30 November 2021, Wiegman's England side set a new national record with a 20–0 win over Latvia during World Cup qualifying. The previous record was 13–0 against Hungary, set in 2005. The match was Wiegman's sixth in charge and maintained her 100% record. England maintained the record throughout World Cup qualifying, winning all 10 matches and outscoring their opponents 80–0.

The Lionesses claimed their first silverware of the Wiegman era at the inaugural Arnold Clark Cup, a friendly invitational tournament hosted by England and featuring four of the top 10 ranked nations. After draws with Canada and Spain, England beat Germany 3–1 at Molineux Stadium on the final matchday to claim the 2022 Arnold Clark Cup ahead of Spain on goal difference in what Wiegman called "a successful step towards the Euros" hosted by England later that year.

In July 2022, Wiegman managed England to victory in the UEFA Women's Euro 2022 final with a 2–1 victory against Germany at Wembley Stadium. She became the fourth manager – all women's – to retain the Euros title and the first to win the tournament with two different countries, having coached her native Netherlands to the title in 2017. On 25 August 2022, following her triumph with the Lionesses, she won the UEFA Women's Coach of the Year Award for the 2021–22 season. In December 2022, Wiegman was appointed as an Honorary Commander of the Order of the British Empire (CBE) "for services to association football", in recognition of her role in the Lionesses' success. On 27 February 2023, Wiegman was awarded The Best FIFA Women's Coach for 2022 making it her third time of winning the award, the most by any coach. She became the only coach to have won the award more than once.

In February 2023, England retained their title at the 2023 Arnold Clark Cup, this time winning all three games.

On 6 April 2023, Wiegman coached England to victory in the 2023 Women's Finalissima, the first CONMEBOL–UEFA Finalissima to be organised for women's teams. England beat Brazil at Wembley 4–2 on penalties following a 1–1 draw after 90 minutes. Five days later, on the occasion of her 31st match, Wiegman lost as England manager for the first time, losing 2–0 in a friendly against Australia. On 16 August 2023, England beat host country Australia 3–1 at Stadium Australia to set up a first World Cup Final match against Spain at the 2023 FIFA Women's World Cup, where they lost 1–0.

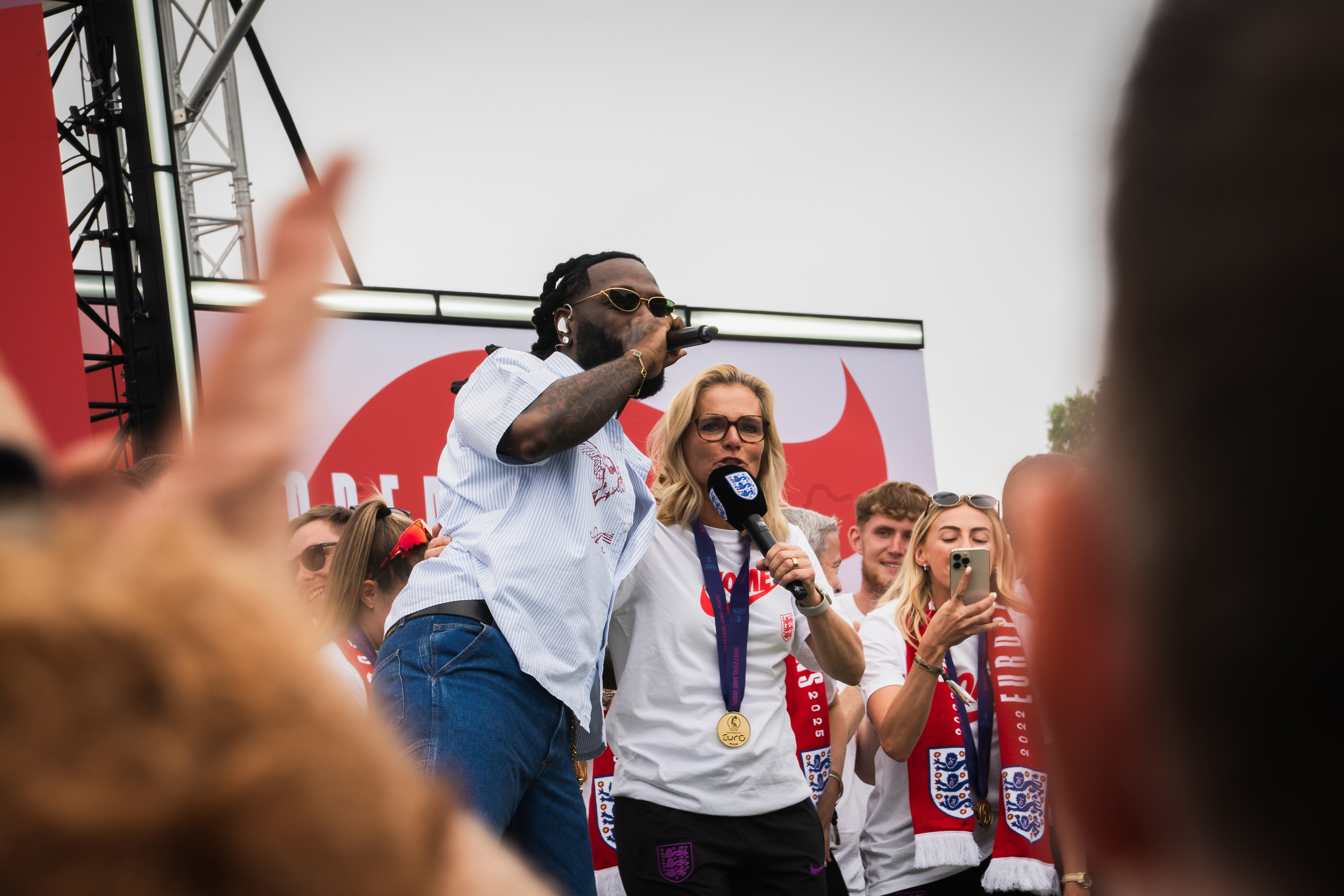
Wiegman dancing with Burna Boy after England won the Euro 2025

On 27 July 2025, Wiegman led England to their second win in the UEFA Women's Championship after defeating Spain 3–1 on penalties following a 1–1 draw in the final, coaching the Lionesses to back-to-back victories in the tournament. Wiegman's win in 2025 marked her third successive victory in the tournament.

In December 2025, Wiegman was appointed an Honorary Dame Commander of the Order of the British Empire (DBE) following her third consecutive Euros win as manager.

=== Great Britain Women ===
On 20 September 2023, Wiegman was announced as manager of the Great Britain women's Olympic football team for the 2024 Olympics should the team qualify via England's Nations League campaign. England failed to qualify, finishing second behind Netherlands and exiting at the group stage.

== Managerial statistics ==
As of 13 October 2026

Managerial record by team and tenure
| Team | From | To | Record | | | | | | | |
| Team | From | To | P | W | D | L | GF | GA | GD | Win % |
|---|---|---|---|---|---|---|---|---|---|---|
| ADO Den Haag | 1 August 2007 | 30 June 2014 | 177 | 101 | 34 | 42 | 382 | 200 | +182 | 57.06 |
| Netherlands | 23 December 2016 | 31 August 2021 | 72 | 52 | 9 | 11 | 205 | 54 | +151 | 72.22 |
| England | 1 September 2021 | present | 82 | 58 | 13 | 11 | 266 | 58 | +208 | 70.73 |
| Career totals | | | 331 | 211 | 56 | 64 | 853 | 312 | +541 | 63.75 |

== Honours ==
=== Player ===
KFC '71

- KNVB Cup: 1986–87

North Carolina Tar Heels

- NCAA Division I Women's Soccer Championship: 1989

Ter Leede

- Dutch championship: 2000–01, 2002–03
- KNVB Cup: 2000–01

=== Manager ===
Ter Leede

- Dutch championship: 2006–07
- KNVB Cup: 2006–07

ADO Den Haag Women

- Eredivisie: 2011–12
- KNVB Cup: 2011–12, 2012–13

Netherlands Women

- FIFA Women's World Cup runner-up: 2019
- UEFA Women's Championship: 2017
- Algarve Cup: 2018

England Women

- FIFA Women's World Cup runner-up: 2023
- UEFA Women's Championship: 2022, 2025
- Women's Finalissima: 2023
- Arnold Clark Cup: 2022, 2023

Individual

- KNVB Bondsridder ("Association Knight"): 2012
- The Best FIFA Women's Coach: 2017, 2020, 2022, 2023, 2025
- UEFA Women's Coach of the Year: 2021–22, 2022–23
- IFFHS World's Best Woman National Coach: 2020, 2022, 2023
- Freedom of the City of London (announced 1 August 2022)
- BBC Sports Personality of the Year Coach Award: 2022 2025
- Women's Football Awards Manager of the Year: 2024
- Women's Johan Cruyff Trophy: 2025
- Dutch Coach of the Year: 2025 (first woman awarded this)
- FWA Tribute Award: 2026

=== Orders ===
- Netherlands: Knight of the Order of Orange-Nassau (2017)
- United Kingdom:
  - Honorary Commander of the Order of the British Empire (CBE) 2022 Special Honours
  - Honorary Dame Commander of the Order of the British Empire (DBE) 2025 Special Honours
