= Tommy Stroot =

German football manager (born 1988)

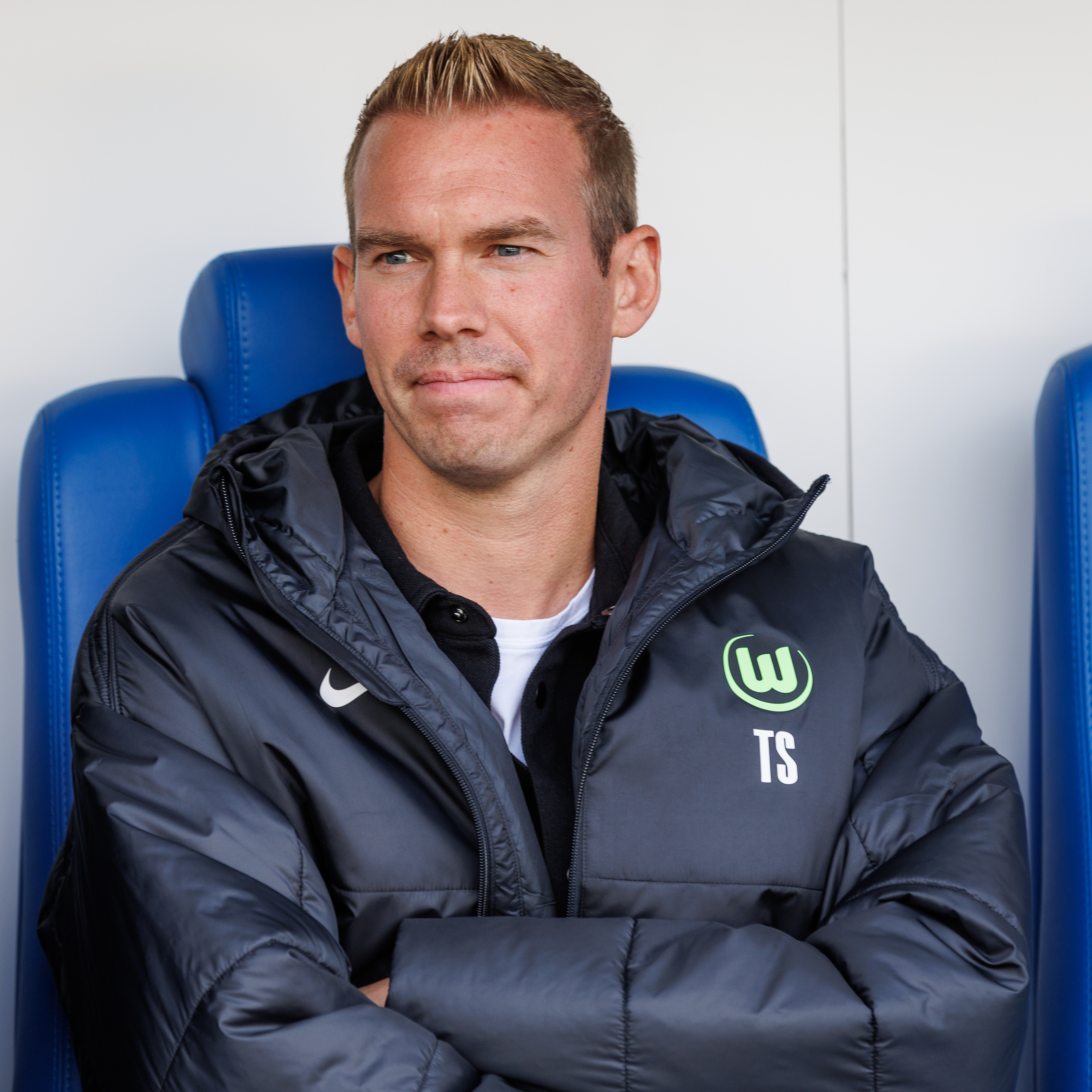
- Stroot in 2024

Personal information
- Date of birth: 24 December 1988 (age 37)
- Place of birth: Nordhorn, Germany

Managerial career
- Years: Team
- 2013–2016: SV Meppen
- 2016–2021: FC Twente
- 2021–2025: VfL Wolfsburg

Tommy Stroot (born 24 December 1988) is a German football manager who last managed VfL Wolfsburg.

== Early life ==
Stroot was born in Nordhorn, Germany to a Dutch mother and German father. He studied physiotherapy and worked with disabled people before becoming a coach.

== Career ==
In 2013, Stroot was appointed manager of German side SV Meppen. In 2016, he was appointed manager of Dutch side FC Twente. He helped the club win its domestic league in 2019 and 2021. In 2021, he was appointed manager of German side VfL Wolfsburg, replacing Stephan Lerch. He helped the club win its domestic league in 2022 and advance to the Women's Champions League final in 2023.
