= Lluís Cortés =

Spanish football coach

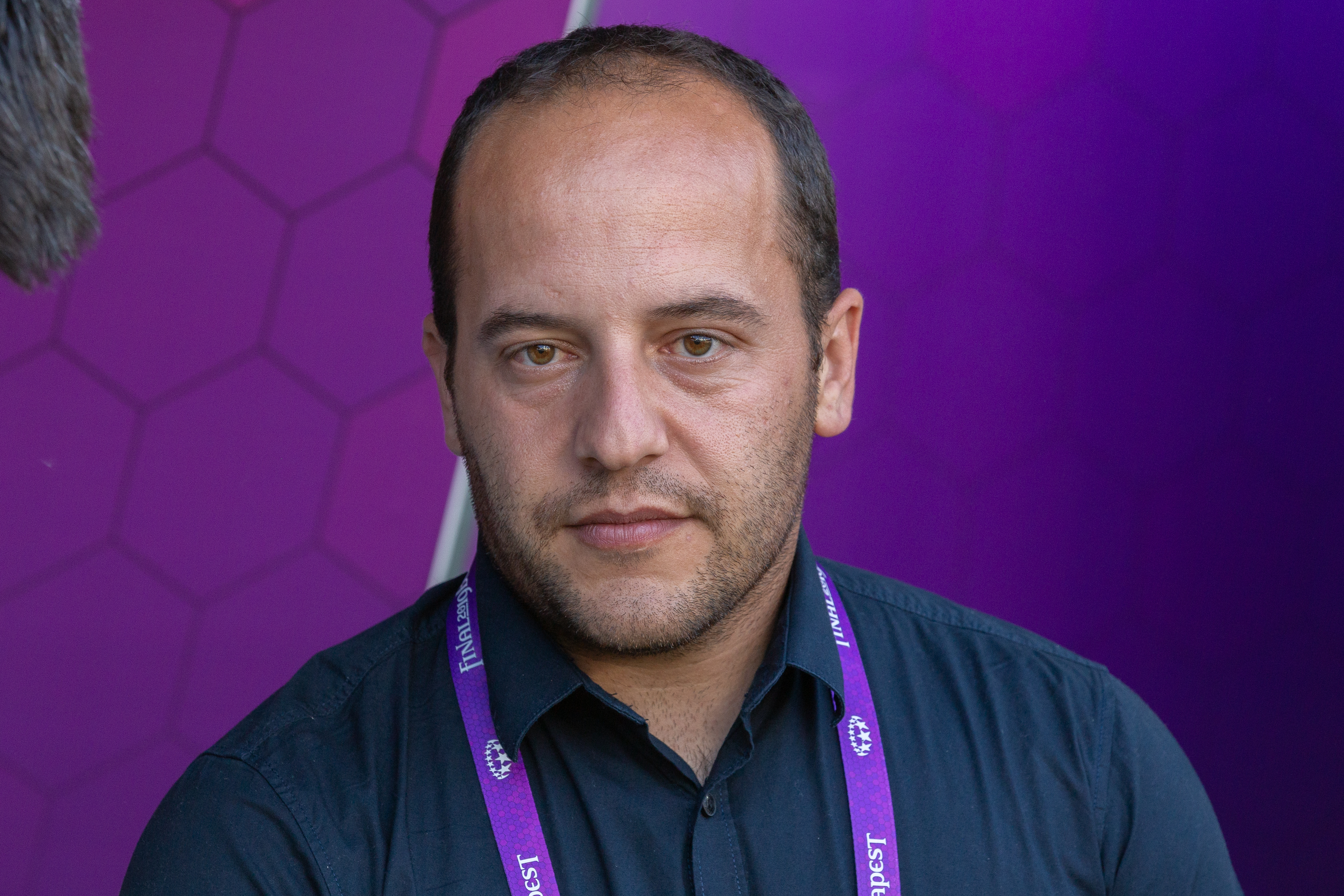
- Lluís Cortés in 2019

Personal information
- Full name: Lluís Cortés Cava
- Date of birth: 10 August 1986 (age 40)
- Place of birth: Lleida, Spain
- Height: 1.87 m (6 ft 2 in)
- Position: Midfielder

Youth career
- 1990–2005: Lleida

Senior career*
Years	Team	Apps	(Gls)
2004–2005	Lleida	2	(0)
2005–2006	Atlético Monzón		
2006–2007	Balaguer		
2007–2008	Tàrrega		
2008–2009	Binéfar		
2009–2011	Alcarrás		

Managerial career
- 2002–2005: Lleida (youth)
- 2005–2006: Balaguer (youth)
- 2011–2017: Catalonia women (youth)
- 2013–2018: Catalonia women (assistant)
- 2017–2019: Barcelona Femení (assistant)
- 2019–2021: Barcelona Femení
- 2021–2023: Ukraine Women
- 2023–: Saudi Arabia Women
- * Club domestic league appearances and goals

Lluís Cortés Cava (born 10 August 1986) is a Spanish football coach who is the current manager of Saudi Arabia women's national football team. He won the treble in 2020–21 season with Barcelona Femení. Before becoming a coach, he played briefly for UE Lleida in the Spanish Segunda División in 2004-05.

== Coaching career ==
Cortés has extensive experience in the women's game, having managed Catalan U12, U16, and U18 teams, and the senior side from 2014 to 2018.

Cortés joined Barcelona as an analyst in the summer of 2017, and until 2019 he was part of the assistant coaching team.

On 8 January 2019, he replaced Fran Sánchez as new head coach. With Cortés as manager, the club reached its first Women's Champions League final in 2019, but failed to win it, losing to Lyon. A year later in 2020, Barcelona won the Spanish Primera División and Supercopa de España. Barcelona completed the 2019-20 Spanish domestic double after winning 2019-20 Copa de la Reina in February 2021.

Barcelona successfully defended the Primera División title after winning their first 26 games. He led Barcelona to the Women's Champions League final in 2021, two years after their defeat against Lyon. Barcelona emerged victorious, defeating Chelsea 4–0 to win their first Women's Champions League title. In May 2021, Barcelona Femení completed their first treble after winning 2020-21 Copa de la Reina against Levante at the Estadio Municipal de Butarque. Despite winning the historic treble, reports emerged that several Barcelona Femení players had requested his sacking, and he decided to resign from his role as Barcelona Femení’s head coach after two years in charge.

On 14 November, the president of the Ukrainian Football Association Andriy Pavelko announced the appointment of Cortés as the head coach of the Ukraine national women's team.

On 11 December 2023, Cortés was appointed manager of Saudi Arabia women's national football team, signing a contract until 2027.

== Managerial statistics ==
As of matches played 23 February 2024

Managerial record by team and tenure
Team	From	To	Record								Ref
Team	From	To	G	W	D	L	GF	GA	GD	Win %	Ref
Barcelona	8 January 2019	27 June 2021	101	90	3	8	388	52	+336	89.11	
Ukraine Women	14 November 2021	8 August 2023	11	6	1	4	14	16	−2	54.55	
Saudi Arabia Women	11 December 2023		5	2	0	3	8	8	+0	40.00	
Career totals			117	98	4	15	410	76	+334	83.76	

== Honours ==
=== Manager ===
FC Barcelona Femení

- UEFA Women's Champions League: 2020–21; runner-up 2018–19
- Primera División: 2019–20, 2020–21
- Copa de la Reina: 2020, 2021
- Supercopa de España: 2020
- Copa Catalunya Femenina: 2019

Individual

- UEFA Women's Coach of the Year: 2020–21
- IFFHS Women's World's Best Club Coach: 2021
