= Jean-Luc Vasseur =

French football manager (born 1969)

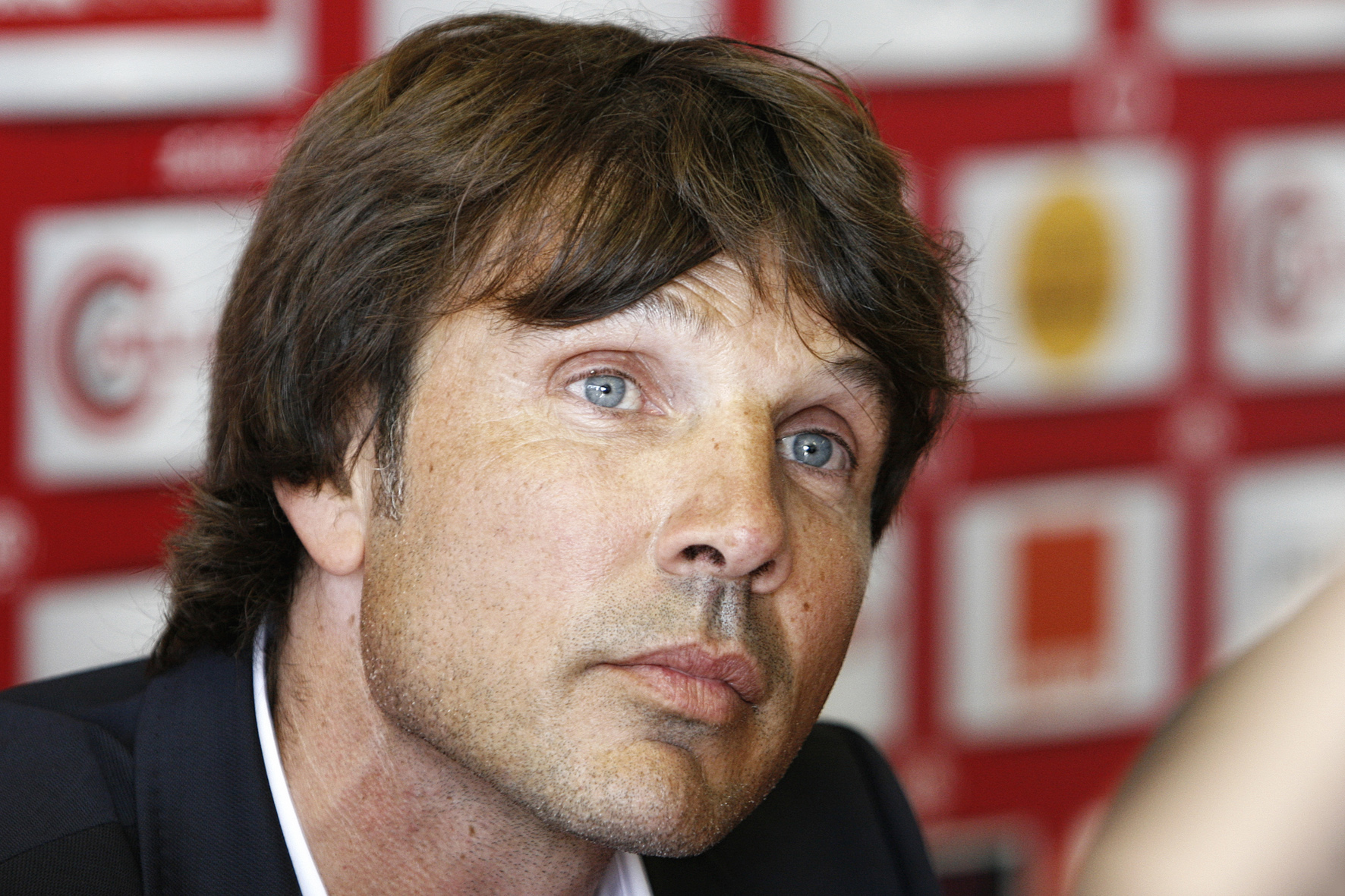
- Jean-Luc Vasseur in 2014

Personal information
- Date of birth: 1 January 1969 (age 57)
- Place of birth: Poissy, France
- Height: 1.75 m (5 ft 9 in)
- Position: Midfielder

Senior career*
| Years | Team | Apps | (Gls) |
| 1986–1992 | Paris Saint-Germain | 22 | (0) |
| 1992–1995 | Rennes | 96 | (2) |
| 1995–1996 | Saint-Étienne | 13 | (0) |
| 1996–1998 | Créteil | 35 | (3) |
| 1998–1999 | Racing Paris | 14 | (0) |
| 1999–2001 | Aubervilliers | | |
| Total | | 180 | (5) |

Managerial career
- 2001–2011: Paris Saint-Germain (youth)
- 2011–2014: Créteil
- 2014–2015: Reims
- 2015–2016: Paris FC
- 2017–2018: Châteauroux
- 2019–2021: Lyon (women)
- 2021–2022: Everton (women)
- 2024: Versailles
- * Club domestic league appearances and goals

Jean-Luc Vasseur (born 1 January 1969) is a French professional football manager and former player.

== Career ==
As a player, Vasseur played with Paris Saint-Germain, Stade Rennais, Saint-Étienne, Créteil, Racing Paris and FCM Aubervilliers. In June 2014, he was appointed as the new manager of Stade de Reims. Previously he spent three seasons with US Créteil. In 2013, he won the Championnat National with US Créteil. In his first Ligue 1 game, he managed a 2–2 draw with Stade de Reims against defending champions Paris Saint-Germain.

On 7 April 2015, Vasseur was sacked as manager of Stade de Reims.

On 17 June 2019, Vasseur was appointed manager of Lyon Féminin.

On 28 April 2021, Lyon sacked Vasseur and replaced him with Sonia Bompastor.

On 29 October 2021, Everton Women hired Vasseur as their manager on a contract to June 2024, succeeding Willie Kirk. However, Everton then sacked Vasseur on 1 February 2022, after three losses, two draws, and one win. The Telegraph reported that players were also unhappy with Vasseur's training methods.

On 1 March 2024, he was named new manager of Championnat National club Versailles.

== Personal life ==
Vasseur is the godfather of Francis De Percin's daughter. They were teammates at Paris Saint-Germain.

== Honours ==
=== Manager ===
Paris Saint-Germain U17

- Championnat National U17: 2010–11

Créteil

- Championnat National: 2012–13

Lyon Féminin

- UEFA Women's Champions League: 2019–20
- Division 1 Féminine: 2019–20
- Coupe de France Féminine: 2019–20
- Trophée des Championnes: 2019
- Women's International Champions Cup: 2019

Individual

- UEFA Women's Coach of the Year: 2019–20
- World Soccer's Women's World Manager of the Year: 2020
- IFFHS World's Best Woman Club Coach: 2020
