= The Best FIFA Goalkeeper =

International football award

- Date: 2017; 9 years ago
- Presented by: FIFA
- First award: 2017
- Currently held by: (Italy) Gianluigi Donnarumma (1st award)

Highlights
- Most awards: (Argentina) Emiliano Martínez (2 awards)

The Best FIFA Goalkeeper is an association football award presented annually by the sport's governing body, FIFA, to the world's best men's and women's goalkeeper.

== The Best FIFA Men's Goalkeeper Award winners ==
Year	Rank	Player	Club(s) played for	National team	Votes
2017	1	Gianluigi Buffon	(Italy) Juventus	Italy	42.42%
2017	2	Manuel Neuer	(Germany) Bayern Munich	Germany	32.32%
2017	3	Keylor Navas	(Spain) Real Madrid	Costa Rica	10.10%
2018	1	Thibaut Courtois	(England) Chelsea	Belgium	—N/a
2018	2	Hugo Lloris	(England) Tottenham Hotspur	France	—N/a
2018	3	Kasper Schmeichel	(England) Leicester City	Denmark	—N/a
2019	1	Alisson	(England) Liverpool	Brazil	45
2019	2	Marc-André ter Stegen	(Spain) Barcelona	Germany	41
2019	3	Ederson	(England) Manchester City	Brazil	24
2020	1	Manuel Neuer	(Germany) Bayern Munich	Germany	28
2020	2	Alisson	(England) Liverpool	Brazil	20
2020	3	Jan Oblak	(Spain) Atlético Madrid	Slovenia	12
2021	1	Édouard Mendy	(England) Chelsea	Senegal	24
2021	2	Gianluigi Donnarumma	(Italy) Milan; (France) Paris Saint-Germain	Italy	24
2021	3	Manuel Neuer	(Germany) Bayern Munich	Germany	12
2022	1	Emiliano Martínez	(England) Aston Villa	Argentina	26
2022	2	Thibaut Courtois	(Spain) Real Madrid	Belgium	20
2022	3	Yassine Bounou	(Spain) Sevilla	Morocco	14
2023	1	Ederson	(England) Manchester City	Brazil	23
2023	2	Thibaut Courtois	(Spain) Real Madrid	Belgium	20
2023	3	Yassine Bounou	(Spain) Sevilla; (Saudi Arabia) Al Hilal	Morocco	16
2024	1	Emiliano Martínez	(England) Aston Villa	Argentina	26
2024	2	Ederson	(England) Manchester City	Brazil	16
2024	3	Unai Simón	(Spain) Athletic Bilbao	Spain	13
2025	1	Gianluigi Donnarumma	(France) Paris Saint Germain; (England) Manchester City	Italy	28
2025	2	Thibaut Courtois	(Spain) Real Madrid	Belgium	20
2025	3	Alisson	(England) Liverpool	Brazil	9

== The Best FIFA Women's Goalkeeper Award winners ==
Year	Rank	Player	Club(s) played for	National team	Votes
2019	1	Sari van Veenendaal	(England) Arsenal; (Spain) Atlético Madrid	Netherlands	—N/a
2019	2	Christiane Endler	(France) Paris Saint-Germain	Chile	—N/a
2019	3	Hedvig Lindahl	(England) Chelsea; (Germany) VfL Wolfsburg	Sweden	—N/a
2020	1	Sarah Bouhaddi	(France) Lyon	France	24
2020	2	Christiane Endler	(France) Paris Saint-Germain	Chile	22
2020	3	Alyssa Naeher	(United States) Chicago Red Stars	United States	10
2021	1	Christiane Endler	(France) Paris Saint-Germain; (France) Lyon	Chile	26
2021	2	Stephanie Labbé	(Sweden) FC Rosengård; (France) Paris Saint-Germain	Canada	20
2021	3	Ann-Katrin Berger	(England) Chelsea	Germany	14
2022	1	Mary Earps	(England) Manchester United	England	26
2022	2	Christiane Endler	(France) Lyon	Chile	22
2022	3	Ann-Katrin Berger	(England) Chelsea	Germany	10
2023	1	Mary Earps	(England) Manchester United	England	28
2023	2	Cata Coll	(Spain) Barcelona	Spain	14
2023	3	Mackenzie Arnold	(England) West Ham United	Australia	12
2024	1	Alyssa Naeher	(United States) Chicago Red Stars	United States	26
2024	2	Cata Coll	(Spain) Barcelona	Spain	22
2024	3	Mary Earps	(England) Manchester United; (France) Paris Saint Germain	England	11
2025	1	Hannah Hampton	(England) Chelsea	England	28
2025	2	Cata Coll	(Spain) Barcelona	Spain	20
2025	3	Christiane Endler	(France) Lyon	Chile	10

== See also ==
- The Best FIFA Football Awards
- The Best FIFA Men's Player
- The Best FIFA Women's Player
