= Person of the Year =

Person of the Year, Man of the Year or Woman of the Year is an award given to an individual by any type of organization. Most often, it is given by a newspaper or other news outlet to annually recognize a public figure. Such awards have typically been awarded to one person, near or after the end of a calendar year. The awardee is usually someone widely known to news media's audience. A local newspaper typically gives a Person of the Year award to a local individual. However, prominent Person of the Year awards have been given to persons well beyond the scope of a given news market, to animals (Secretariat), to two or more persons in the event of a tie, and to groups of persons whose membership is not clear. Also the award is presented annually by some organizations but may be a one-off or occasional event for others.

The award can be facetious or serious. The chosen person is usually someone who has been notably influential or prominent during the year and could also be a hero or villain. It is externally oriented, unlike most awards. It's given to someone who has no affiliation with the awarding organization.

Variations on the theme include "Business Person of the Year," "Small Business Person of the Year," or "Entrepreneur of the Year." They are commonly awarded by local chambers of commerce or other economic boosters. Junior League chapters (and other organizations) gave "Woman of the Year" awards. The Leukemia & Lymphoma Society gave "Man & Woman of the Year" awards. Also, the phrase is used in different contexts. The staff of magazines presented artists or photographers with "Cover of the Year" accolades. Various dictionaries release their "Word of the Year." Other awards are for "Album of the Year."

== Awards ==
=== Person of the Year ===
Notable examples include:

- Australian of the Year
- Aviation Week & Space Technology – Vladimir Putin was named person of the year by Aviation Week & Space Technology, an organization that has given the award annually since about 2005.
- Ethiopian Person of the Year
- Financial Times Person of the Year
- Latin Recording Academy Person of the Year
- Le Monde Person of the Year
- MusiCares Person of the Year
- New Zealander of the Year Awards
- The Onion's Person of the Year is an award given by The Onion, a satirical website
- Time Person of the Year – interest in nominees and final selection of the Time magazine's Person of the Year award is widely covered in other media.

=== Man of the Year ===
- DHL Delivery Man of the Year Award, baseball reliever pitchers
- Hasty Pudding Man of the Year, for entertainers
- IHL Man of the Year, awarded by the International Hockey League
- NBA Sixth Man of the Year Award, basketball
- Railroader of the Year, awarded by Railway Age magazine recognizing contributions to North American rail transport
- Rolaids Relief Man of the Year Award, baseball reliever pitchers
- Walter Payton Man of the Year Award, National Football League

== See also ==
- Athlete of the Year
- Footballer of the Year (disambiguation)
- Man of the Year (disambiguation), includes numerous films named after the award
- Woman of the Year, 1942 film
- Woman of the Year (disambiguation)
