= The Best FIFA Football Awards =

International football awards

- Current: The Best FIFA Football Awards 2025
- Awarded for: Excellence in association football team and individual achievements
- Location: Zurich, Switzerland
- Presented by: FIFA
- First award: 9 January 2017
- Website: fifa.com/the-best-fifa-football-awards

The Best FIFA Football Awards is a football award presented annually by the sport's governing body, FIFA.

This ceremony annually awarded the best individuals in various football-related categories, including best players and coaches in men's and women's football; the most beautiful goal; and the selection of the eleven best players, known as FIFPro. In addition, awards were also presented to entities that promoted fair play, to the best fans, and a tribute to an athlete who contributed to the spread of the sport during their career.

The first awarding ceremony was held on 9 January 2017 in Zurich, Switzerland. The award is aimed at reviving the FIFA World Player Gala.

== Men's awards ==
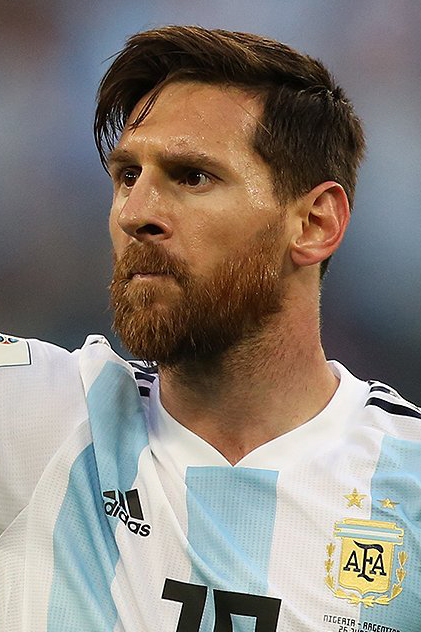
Lionel Messi, the most-awarded player

=== The Best FIFA Men's Player ===
Year	Rank	Player	Team(s)	Points
2016	1st	(Portugal) Cristiano Ronaldo	(Spain) Real Madrid	34.54%
2016	2nd	(Argentina) Lionel Messi	(Spain) Barcelona	26.42%
2016	3rd	(France) Antoine Griezmann	(Spain) Atlético Madrid	7.53%
2017	1st	(Portugal) Cristiano Ronaldo	(Spain) Real Madrid	43.16%
2017	2nd	(Argentina) Lionel Messi	(Spain) Barcelona	19.25%
2017	3rd	(Brazil) Neymar	(Spain) Barcelona (France) Paris Saint-Germain	6.97%
2018	1st	(Croatia) Luka Modrić	(Spain) Real Madrid	29.05%
2018	2nd	(Portugal) Cristiano Ronaldo	(Spain) Real Madrid (Italy) Juventus	19.08%
2018	3rd	(Egypt) Mohamed Salah	(England) Liverpool	11.23%
2019	1st	(Argentina) Lionel Messi	(Spain) Barcelona	46
2019	2nd	(Netherlands) Virgil van Dijk	(England) Liverpool	38
2019	3rd	(Portugal) Cristiano Ronaldo	(Italy) Juventus	36
2020	1st	(Poland) Robert Lewandowski	(Germany) Bayern Munich	52
2020	2nd	(Portugal) Cristiano Ronaldo	(Italy) Juventus	38
2020	3rd	(Argentina) Lionel Messi	(Spain) Barcelona	35
2021	1st	(Poland) Robert Lewandowski	(Germany) Bayern Munich	48
2021	2nd	(Argentina) Lionel Messi	(Spain) Barcelona (France) Paris Saint-Germain	44
2021	3rd	(Egypt) Mohamed Salah	(England) Liverpool	39
2022	1st	(Argentina) Lionel Messi	(France) Paris Saint-Germain	52
2022	2nd	(France) Kylian Mbappé	(France) Paris Saint-Germain	44
2022	3rd	(France) Karim Benzema	(Spain) Real Madrid	34
2023	1st	(Argentina) Lionel Messi	(France) Paris Saint-Germain (United States) Inter Miami	48
2023	2nd	(Norway) Erling Haaland	(England) Manchester City	48
2023	3rd	(France) Kylian Mbappé	(France) Paris Saint-Germain	35
2024	1st	(Brazil) Vinícius Júnior	(Spain) Real Madrid	48
2024	2nd	(Spain) Rodri	(England) Manchester City	43
2024	3rd	(England) Jude Bellingham	(Spain) Real Madrid	37
2025	1st	(France) Ousmane Dembélé	(France) Paris Saint-Germain	50
2025	2nd	(Spain) Lamine Yamal	(Spain) Barcelona	39
2025	3rd	(France) Kylian Mbappé	(Spain) Real Madrid	35

=== The Best FIFA Men's Goalkeeper ===
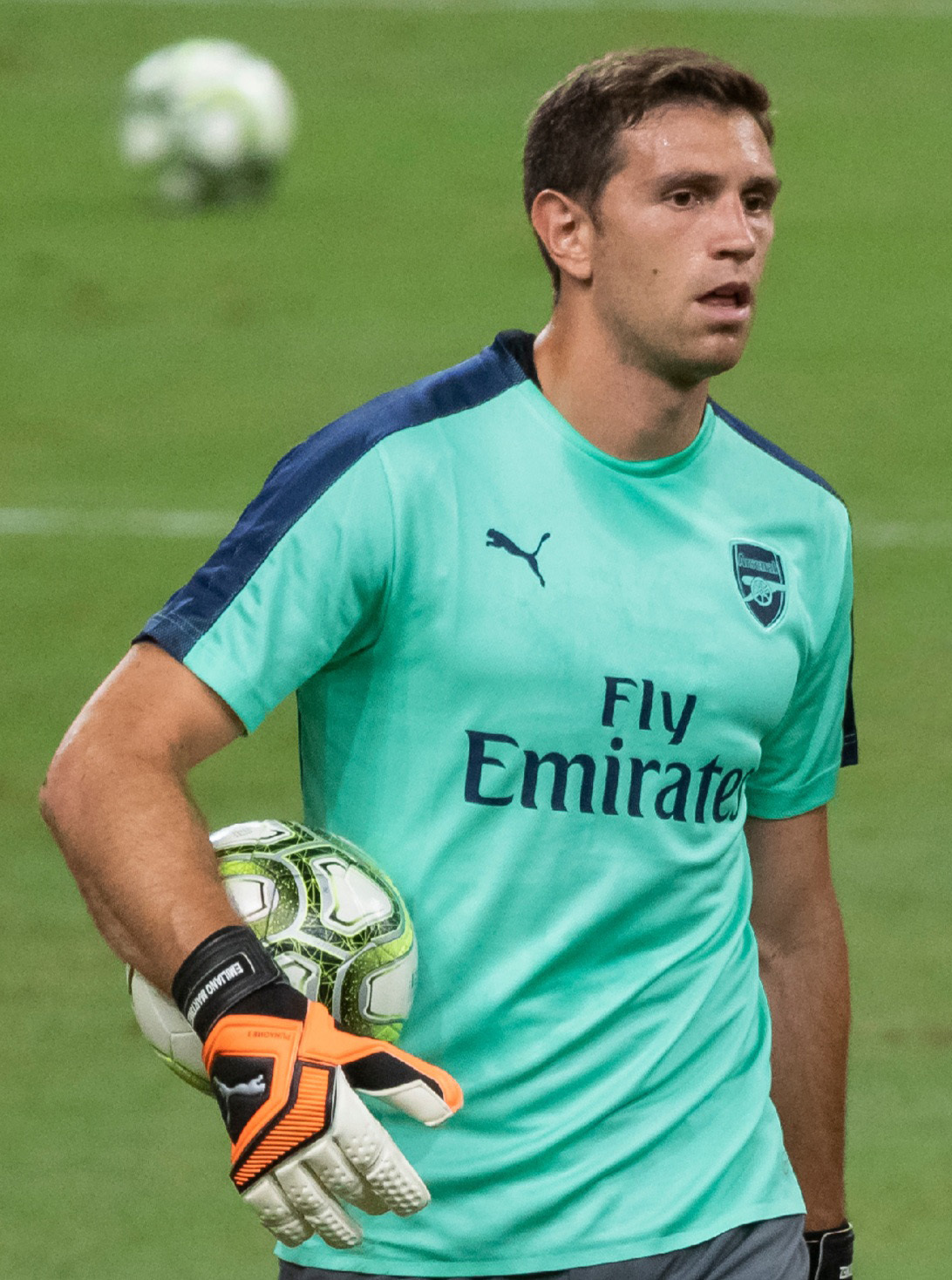
Emiliano Martínez, the most-awarded goalkeeper

Year	Rank	Player	Team(s)
2017	1st	(Italy) Gianluigi Buffon	(Italy) Juventus
2017	2nd	(Germany) Manuel Neuer	(Germany) Bayern Munich
2017	3rd	(Costa Rica) Keylor Navas	(Spain) Real Madrid
2018	1st	(Belgium) Thibaut Courtois	(England) Chelsea (Spain) Real Madrid
2018	2nd	(France) Hugo Lloris	(England) Tottenham Hotspur
2018	3rd	(Denmark) Kasper Schmeichel	(England) Leicester City
2019	1st	(Brazil) Alisson	(England) Liverpool
2019	2nd	(Germany) Marc-André ter Stegen	(Spain) Barcelona
2019	3rd	(Brazil) Ederson	(England) Manchester City
2020	1st	(Germany) Manuel Neuer	(Germany) Bayern Munich
2020	2nd	(Brazil) Alisson	(England) Liverpool
2020	3rd	(Slovenia) Jan Oblak	(Spain) Atlético Madrid
2021	1st	(Senegal) Édouard Mendy	(England) Chelsea
2021	2nd	(Italy) Gianluigi Donnarumma	(Italy) Milan (France) Paris Saint-Germain
2021	3rd	(Germany) Manuel Neuer	(Germany) Bayern Munich
2022	1st	(Argentina) Emiliano Martínez	(England) Aston Villa
2022	2nd	(Belgium) Thibaut Courtois	(Spain) Real Madrid
2022	3rd	(Morocco) Yassine Bounou	(Spain) Sevilla
2023	1st	(Brazil) Ederson	(England) Manchester City
2023	2nd	(Belgium) Thibaut Courtois	(Spain) Real Madrid
2023	3rd	(Morocco) Yassine Bounou	(Spain) Sevilla (Saudi Arabia) Al Hilal
2024	1st	(Argentina) Emiliano Martínez	(England) Aston Villa
2024	2nd	(Brazil) Ederson	(England) Manchester City
2024	3rd	(Spain) Unai Simón	(Spain) Athletic Bilbao
2025	1st	(Italy) Gianluigi Donnarumma	(France) Paris Saint-Germain (England) Manchester City
2025	2nd	(Belgium) Thibaut Courtois	(Spain) Real Madrid
2025	3rd	(Brazil) Alisson	(England) Liverpool

=== The Best FIFA Men's Coach ===
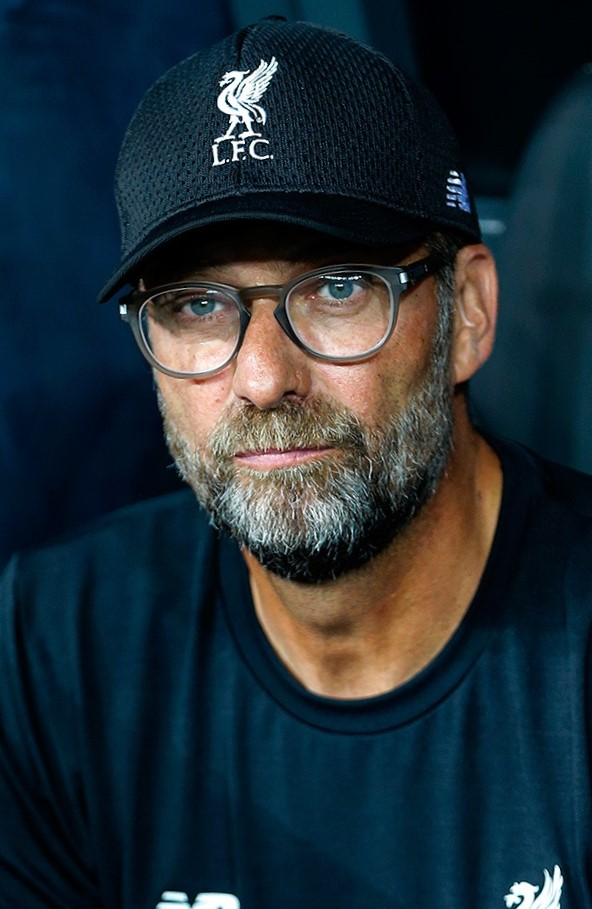
Jürgen Klopp, the most-awarded coach

Year	Rank	Coach	Team(s) managed
2016	1st	(Italy) Claudio Ranieri	(England) Leicester City
2016	2nd	(France) Zinedine Zidane	(Spain) Real Madrid Castilla (Spain) Real Madrid
2016	3rd	(Portugal) Fernando Santos	Portugal
2017	1st	(France) Zinedine Zidane	(Spain) Real Madrid
2017	2nd	(Italy) Antonio Conte	(England) Chelsea
2017	3rd	(Italy) Massimiliano Allegri	(Italy) Juventus
2018	1st	(France) Didier Deschamps	France
2018	2nd	(France) Zinedine Zidane	(Spain) Real Madrid
2018	3rd	(Croatia) Zlatko Dalić	Croatia
2019	1st	(Germany) Jürgen Klopp	(England) Liverpool
2019	2nd	(Spain) Pep Guardiola	(England) Manchester City
2019	3rd	(Argentina) Mauricio Pochettino	(England) Tottenham Hotspur
2020	1st	(Germany) Jürgen Klopp	(England) Liverpool
2020	2nd	(Germany) Hansi Flick	(Germany) Bayern Munich
2020	3rd	(Argentina) Marcelo Bielsa	(England) Leeds United
2021	1st	(Germany) Thomas Tuchel	(France) Paris Saint-Germain (England) Chelsea
2021	2nd	(Italy) Roberto Mancini	Italy
2021	3rd	(Spain) Pep Guardiola	(England) Manchester City
2022	1st	(Argentina) Lionel Scaloni	Argentina
2022	2nd	(Italy) Carlo Ancelotti	(Spain) Real Madrid
2022	3rd	(Spain) Pep Guardiola	(England) Manchester City
2023	1st	(Spain) Pep Guardiola	(England) Manchester City
2023	2nd	(Italy) Luciano Spalletti	Napoli; Italy
2023	3rd	(Italy) Simone Inzaghi	(Italy) Inter Milan
2024	1st	(Italy) Carlo Ancelotti	(Spain) Real Madrid
2024	2nd	(Spain) Xabi Alonso	(Germany) Bayer Leverkusen
2024	3rd	(Spain) Pep Guardiola	(England) Manchester City
2025	1st	(Spain) Luis Enrique	(France) Paris Saint-Germain
2025	2nd	(Germany) Hansi Flick	(Spain) Barcelona
2025	3rd	(Netherlands) Arne Slot	(England) Liverpool

=== FIFA FIFPRO Men's World 11 ===
Year	Goalkeeper	Defenders	Midfielders	Forwards
2016	(Germany) Manuel Neuer (Bayern Munich)	(Brazil) Marcelo (Real Madrid) (Spain) Sergio Ramos (Real Madrid) (Spain) Gerard Piqué (Barcelona) (Brazil) Dani Alves (Barcelona/Juventus)	(Spain) Andrés Iniesta (Barcelona) (Germany) Toni Kroos (Real Madrid) (Croatia) Luka Modrić (Real Madrid)	(Portugal) Cristiano Ronaldo (Real Madrid) (Uruguay) Luis Suárez (Barcelona) (Argentina) Lionel Messi (Barcelona)
2017	(Italy) Gianluigi Buffon (Juventus)	(Brazil) Marcelo (Real Madrid) (Spain) Sergio Ramos (Real Madrid) (Italy) Leonardo Bonucci (Juventus/Milan) (Brazil) Dani Alves (Juventus/Paris Saint-Germain)	(Spain) Andrés Iniesta (Barcelona) (Germany) Toni Kroos (Real Madrid) (Croatia) Luka Modrić (Real Madrid)	(Portugal) Cristiano Ronaldo (Real Madrid) (Brazil) Neymar (Barcelona/Paris Saint-Germain) (Argentina) Lionel Messi (Barcelona)
2018	(Spain) David de Gea (Manchester United)	(Brazil) Marcelo (Real Madrid) (Spain) Sergio Ramos (Real Madrid) (France) Raphaël Varane (Real Madrid) (Brazil) Dani Alves (Paris Saint-Germain)	(Belgium) Eden Hazard (Chelsea) (France) N'Golo Kanté (Chelsea) (Croatia) Luka Modrić (Real Madrid)	(Portugal) Cristiano Ronaldo (Real Madrid/Juventus) (France) Kylian Mbappé (Paris Saint-Germain) (Argentina) Lionel Messi (Barcelona)
2019	(Brazil) Alisson (Liverpool)	(Brazil) Marcelo (Real Madrid) (Spain) Sergio Ramos (Real Madrid) (Netherlands) Virgil van Dijk (Liverpool) (Netherlands) Matthijs de Ligt (Ajax/Juventus)	(Belgium) Eden Hazard (Chelsea/Real Madrid) (Netherlands) Frenkie de Jong (Ajax/Barcelona) (Croatia) Luka Modrić (Real Madrid)	(Portugal) Cristiano Ronaldo (Juventus) (France) Kylian Mbappé (Paris Saint-Germain) (Argentina) Lionel Messi (Barcelona)
2020	(Brazil) Alisson (Liverpool)	(Canada) Alphonso Davies (Bayern Munich) (Spain) Sergio Ramos (Real Madrid) (Netherlands) Virgil van Dijk (Liverpool) (England) Trent Alexander-Arnold (Liverpool)	(Spain) Thiago (Bayern Munich/Liverpool) (Belgium) Kevin De Bruyne (Manchester City) (Germany) Joshua Kimmich (Bayern Munich)	(Portugal) Cristiano Ronaldo (Juventus) (Poland) Robert Lewandowski (Bayern Munich) (Argentina) Lionel Messi (Barcelona)
2021	(Italy) Gianluigi Donnarumma (Milan/Paris Saint-Germain)	(Austria) David Alaba (Bayern Munich/Real Madrid) (Italy) Leonardo Bonucci (Juventus) (Portugal) Rúben Dias (Manchester City)	(Italy) Jorginho (Chelsea) (France) N'Golo Kanté (Chelsea) (Belgium) Kevin De Bruyne (Manchester City)	(Portugal) Cristiano Ronaldo (Juventus/Manchester United) (Norway) Erling Haaland (Borussia Dortmund) (Poland) Robert Lewandowski (Bayern Munich) (Argentina) Lionel Messi (Barcelona/Paris Saint-Germain)
2022	(Belgium) Thibaut Courtois (Real Madrid)	(Morocco) Achraf Hakimi (Paris Saint-Germain) (Netherlands) Virgil van Dijk (Liverpool) (Portugal) João Cancelo (Manchester City/Bayern Munich)	(Belgium) Kevin De Bruyne (Manchester City) (Brazil) Casemiro (Real Madrid/Manchester United) (Croatia) Luka Modrić (Real Madrid)	(Argentina) Lionel Messi (Paris Saint-Germain) (France) Karim Benzema (Real Madrid) (Norway) Erling Haaland (Borussia Dortmund/Manchester City) (France) Kylian Mbappé (Paris Saint-Germain)
2023	(Belgium) Thibaut Courtois (Real Madrid)	(Portugal) Rúben Dias (Manchester City) (England) John Stones (Manchester City) (England) Kyle Walker (Manchester City)	(England) Jude Bellingham (Borussia Dortmund/Real Madrid) (Belgium) Kevin De Bruyne (Manchester City) (Portugal) Bernardo Silva (Manchester City)	(Brazil) Vinícius Júnior (Real Madrid) (France) Kylian Mbappé (Paris Saint-Germain) (Norway) Erling Haaland (Manchester City) (Argentina) Lionel Messi (Paris Saint-Germain/Inter Miami)

=== FIFA Men's World 11 ===
From the 2024 edition onward, FIFA independently manages their own award, The Best FIFA Men's World 11.

Year	Goalkeeper	Defenders	Midfielders	Forwards
2024	(Argentina) Emiliano Martínez (Aston Villa)	(France) William Saliba (Arsenal) (Portugal) Rúben Dias (Manchester City) (Germany) Antonio Rüdiger (Real Madrid) (Spain) Dani Carvajal (Real Madrid)	(Germany) Toni Kroos (Real Madrid) (Spain) Rodri (Manchester City) (England) Jude Bellingham (Real Madrid)	(Brazil) Vinícius Júnior (Real Madrid) (Norway) Erling Haaland (Manchester City) (Spain) Lamine Yamal (Barcelona)
2025	(Italy) Gianluigi Donnarumma (Paris Saint-Germain/Manchester City)	(Portugal) Nuno Mendes (Paris Saint-Germain) (Netherlands) Virgil van Dijk (Liverpool) (Ecuador) Willian Pacho (Paris Saint-Germain) (Morocco) Achraf Hakimi (Paris Saint-Germain)	(Spain) Pedri (Barcelona) (Portugal) Vitinha (Paris Saint-Germain) (England) Jude Bellingham (Real Madrid) (England) Cole Palmer (Chelsea)	(France) Ousmane Dembélé (Paris Saint-Germain) (Spain) Lamine Yamal (Barcelona)

== Women's awards ==
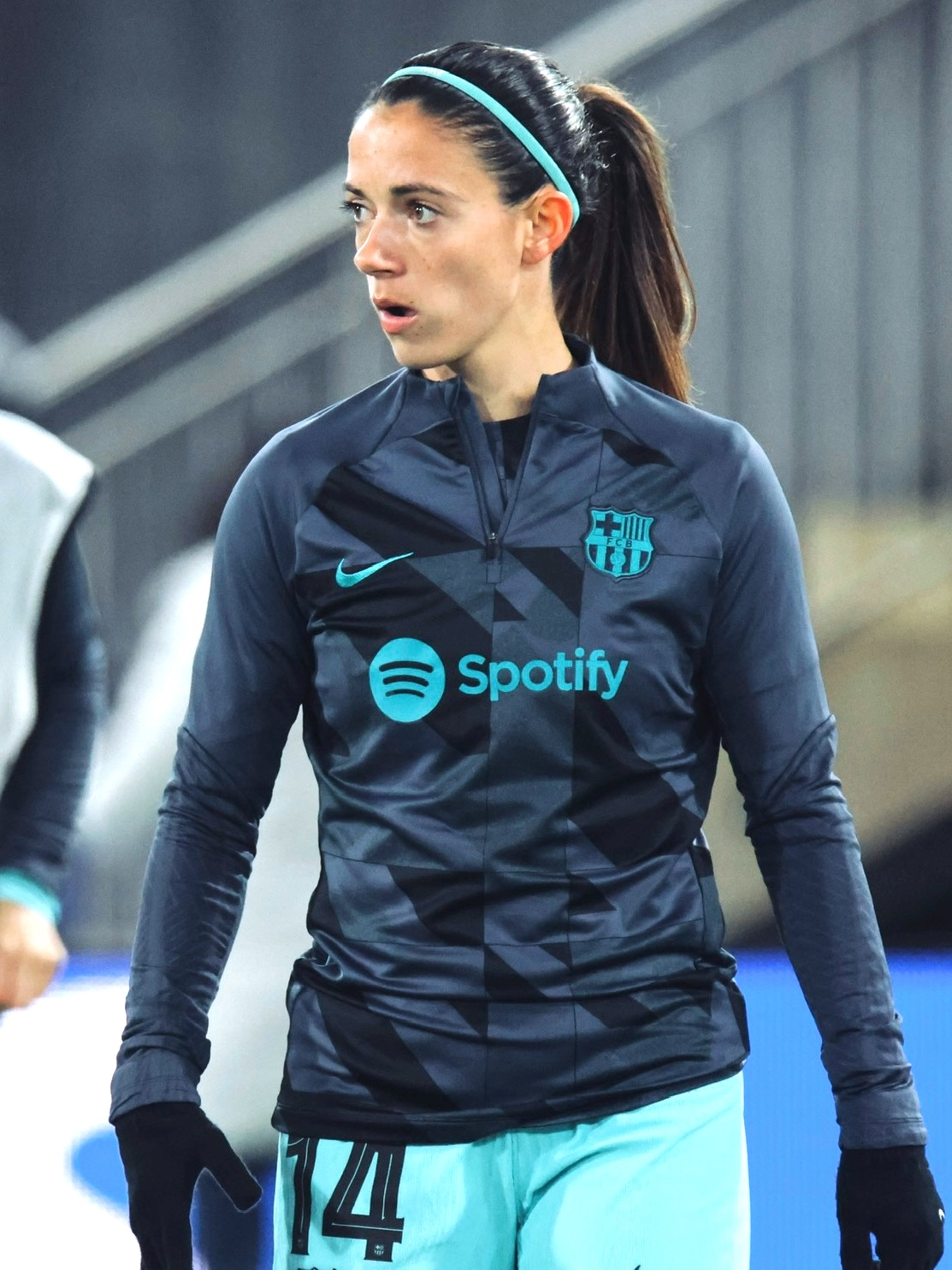
Aitana Bonmatí, most awarded player

=== The Best FIFA Women's Player ===
Year	Rank	Player	Team(s)
2016	1st	(United States) Carli Lloyd	(United States) Houston Dash
2016	2nd	(Brazil) Marta	(Sweden) Rosengård
2016	3rd	(Germany) Melanie Behringer	(Germany) Bayern Munich
2017	1st	(Netherlands) Lieke Martens	(Sweden) Rosengård (Spain) Barcelona
2017	2nd	(United States) Carli Lloyd	(United States) Houston Dash (England) Manchester City
2017	3rd	(Venezuela) Deyna Castellanos	(United States) Florida State Seminoles (United States) Santa Clarita Blue Heat
2018	1st	(Brazil) Marta	(United States) Orlando Pride
2018	2nd	(Germany) Dzsenifer Marozsán	(France) Lyon
2018	3rd	(Norway) Ada Hegerberg	(France) Lyon
2019	1st	(United States) Megan Rapinoe	(United States) Reign FC
2019	2nd	(United States) Alex Morgan	(United States) Orlando Pride
2019	3rd	(England) Lucy Bronze	(France) Lyon
2020	1st	(England) Lucy Bronze	(France) Lyon (England) Manchester City
2020	2nd	(Denmark) Pernille Harder	(England) Chelsea
2020	3rd	(France) Wendie Renard	(France) Lyon
2021	1st	(Spain) Alexia Putellas	(Spain) Barcelona
2021	2nd	(Australia) Sam Kerr	(England) Chelsea
2021	3rd	(Spain) Jennifer Hermoso	(Spain) Barcelona
2022	1st	(Spain) Alexia Putellas	(Spain) Barcelona
2022	2nd	(United States) Alex Morgan	(United States) Orlando Pride (United States) San Diego Wave
2022	3rd	(England) Beth Mead	(England) Arsenal
2023	1st	(Spain) Aitana Bonmatí	(Spain) Barcelona
2023	2nd	(Colombia) Linda Caicedo	(Colombia) Deportivo Cali (Spain) Real Madrid
2023	3rd	(Spain) Jenni Hermoso	(Mexico) Pachuca
2024	1st	(Spain) Aitana Bonmatí	(Spain) Barcelona
2024	2nd	(Zambia) Barbra Banda	(United States) Orlando Pride
2024	3rd	(Norway) Caroline Graham Hansen	(Spain) Barcelona
2025	1st	(Spain) Aitana Bonmatí	(Spain) Barcelona
2025	2nd	(Spain) Mariona Caldentey	(England) Arsenal
2025	3rd	(Spain) Alexia Putellas	(Spain) Barcelona

=== The Best FIFA Women's Goalkeeper ===
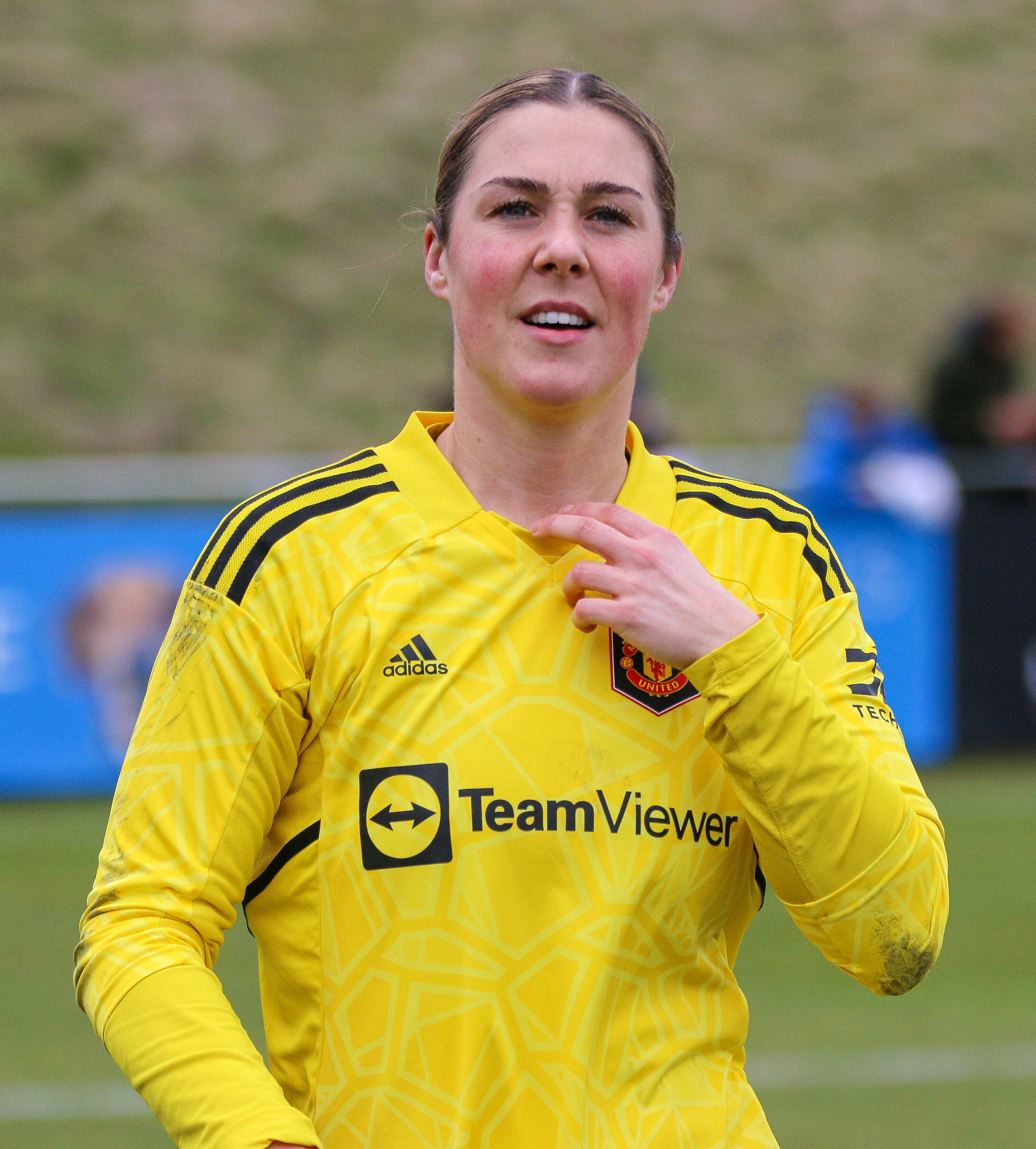
Mary Earps, most awarded goalkeeper

Year	Rank	Player	Team(s)
2016	Not awarded		
2017	Not awarded		
2018	Not awarded		
2019	1st	(Netherlands) Sari van Veenendaal	(England) Arsenal (Spain) Atlético Madrid
2019	2nd	(Chile) Christiane Endler	(France) Paris Saint-Germain
2019	3rd	(Sweden) Hedvig Lindahl	(England) Chelsea (Germany) VfL Wolfsburg
2020	1st	(France) Sarah Bouhaddi	(France) Lyon
2020	2nd	(Chile) Christiane Endler	(France) Paris Saint-Germain
2020	3rd	(United States) Alyssa Naeher	(United States) Chicago Red Stars
2021	1st	(Chile) Christiane Endler	(France) Paris Saint-Germain (France) Lyon
2021	2nd	(Germany) Ann-Katrin Berger	(England) Chelsea
2021	3rd	(Canada) Stephanie Labbé	(Sweden) FC Rosengård (France) Paris Saint-Germain
2022	1st	(England) Mary Earps	(England) Manchester United
2022	2nd	(Chile) Christiane Endler	(France) Lyon
2022	3rd	(Germany) Ann-Katrin Berger	(England) Chelsea
2023	1st	(England) Mary Earps	(England) Manchester United
2023	2nd	(Spain) Cata Coll	(Spain) Barcelona
2023	3rd	(Australia) Mackenzie Arnold	(England) West Ham United
2024	1st	(United States) Alyssa Naeher	(United States) Chicago Red Stars
2024	2nd	(Spain) Cata Coll	(Spain) Barcelona
2024	3rd	(England) Mary Earps	(England) Manchester United (France) Paris Saint-Germain
2025	1st	(England) Hannah Hampton	(England) Chelsea
2025	2nd	(Spain) Cata Coll	(Spain) Barcelona
2025	3rd	(Chile) Christiane Endler	(France) Lyon

=== The Best FIFA Women's Coach ===
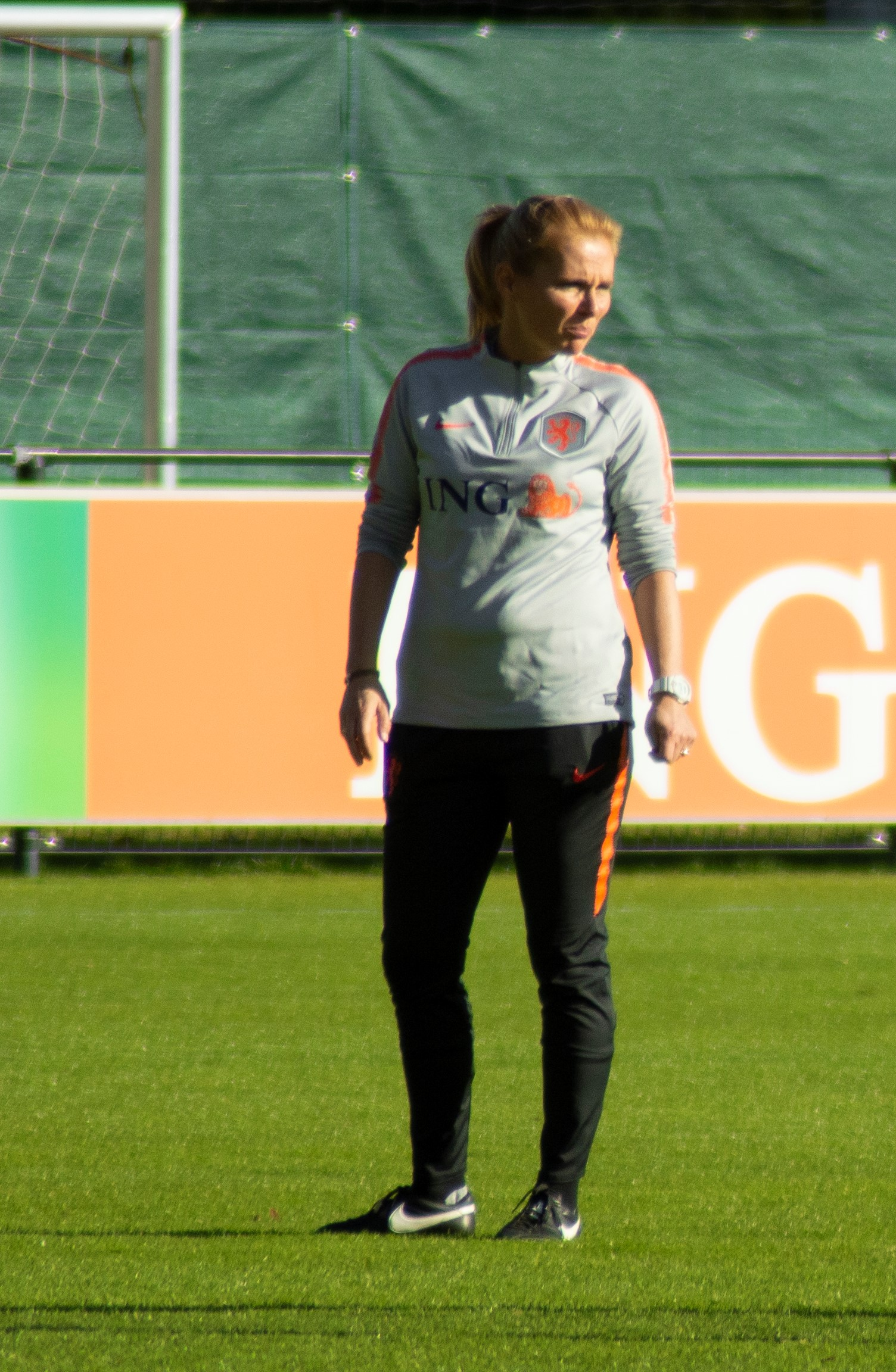
Sarina Wiegman, most awarded coach

Year	Rank	Coach	Team(s) managed
2016	1st	(Germany) Silvia Neid	Germany
2016	2nd	(England) Jill Ellis	United States
2016	3rd	(Sweden) Pia Sundhage	Sweden
2017	1st	(Netherlands) Sarina Wiegman	Netherlands
2017	2nd	(Denmark) Nils Nielsen	Denmark
2017	3rd	(France) Gérard Prêcheur	(France) Lyon
2018	1st	(France) Reynald Pedros	(France) Lyon
2018	2nd	(Netherlands) Sarina Wiegman	Netherlands
2018	3rd	(Japan) Asako Takakura	Japan
2019	1st	(England) Jill Ellis	United States
2019	2nd	(Netherlands) Sarina Wiegman	Netherlands
2019	3rd	(England) Phil Neville	England
2020	1st	(Netherlands) Sarina Wiegman	Netherlands
2020	2nd	(France) Jean-Luc Vasseur	(France) Lyon
2020	3rd	(England) Emma Hayes	(England) Chelsea
2021	1st	(England) Emma Hayes	(England) Chelsea
2021	2nd	(Spain) Lluís Cortés	(Spain) Barcelona
2021	3rd	(Netherlands) Sarina Wiegman	Netherlands
2022	1st	(Netherlands) Sarina Wiegman	England
2022	2nd	(France) Sonia Bompastor	(France) Lyon
2022	3rd	(Sweden) Pia Sundhage	Brazil
2023	1st	(Netherlands) Sarina Wiegman	England
2023	2nd	(England) Emma Hayes	(England) Chelsea
2023	3rd	(Spain) Jonatan Giráldez	(Spain) Barcelona
2024	1st	(England) Emma Hayes	(England) Chelsea; United States
2024	2nd	(Spain) Jonatan Giráldez	(Spain) Barcelona (United States) Washington Spirit
2024	3rd	(Brazil) Arthur Elias	Corinthians; Brazil
2025	1st	(Netherlands) Sarina Wiegman	England
2025	2nd	(France) Sonia Bompastor	(England) Chelsea
2025	3rd	(Netherlands) Renée Slegers	(England) Arsenal

=== FIFA FIFPRO Women's World 11 ===
Year	Goalkeeper	Defenders	Midfielders	Forwards
2016	Not awarded			
2017	Not awarded			
2018	Not awarded			
2019	(Netherlands) Sari van Veenendaal (Arsenal/Atlético Madrid)	(England) Lucy Bronze (Lyon) (Sweden) Nilla Fischer (VfL Wolfsburg/Linköpings) (United States) Kelley O'Hara (Utah Royals) (France) Wendie Renard (Lyon)	(United States) Julie Ertz (Chicago Red Stars) (France) Amandine Henry (Lyon) (United States) Rose Lavelle (Washington Spirit)	(Brazil) Marta (Orlando Pride) (United States) Alex Morgan (Orlando Pride) (United States) Megan Rapinoe (Reign FC)
2020	(Chile) Christiane Endler (Paris Saint-Germain)	(England) Millie Bright (Chelsea) (England) Lucy Bronze (Lyon/Manchester City) (France) Wendie Renard (Lyon)	(Italy) Barbara Bonansea (Juventus) (Spain) Verónica Boquete (Utah Royals/Milan) (France) Delphine Cascarino (Lyon)	(Denmark) Pernille Harder (VfL Wolfsburg/Chelsea) (United States) Tobin Heath (Portland Thorns/Manchester United) (Netherlands) Vivianne Miedema (Arsenal) (United States) Megan Rapinoe (OL Reign)
2021	(Chile) Christiane Endler (Paris Saint-Germain/Lyon)	(England) Lucy Bronze (Manchester City) (England) Millie Bright (Chelsea) (Sweden) Magdalena Eriksson (Chelsea) (France) Wendie Renard (Lyon)	(Argentina) Estefanía Banini (Levante/Atlético Madrid) (Italy) Barbara Bonansea (Juventus) (United States) Carli Lloyd (NJ/NY Gotham FC)	(Brazil) Marta (Orlando Pride) (Netherlands) Vivianne Miedema (Arsenal) (United States) Alex Morgan (Orlando Pride/San Diego Wave FC)
2022	(Chile) Christiane Endler (Lyon)	(England) Lucy Bronze (Manchester City/Barcelona) (Spain) Mapi León (Barcelona) (England) Leah Williamson (Arsenal) (France) Wendie Renard (Lyon)	(Germany) Lena Oberdorf (VfL Wolfsburg) (England) Keira Walsh (Manchester City/Barcelona) (Spain) Alexia Putellas (Barcelona)	(England) Beth Mead (Arsenal) (Australia) Sam Kerr (Chelsea) (United States) Alex Morgan (Orlando Pride/San Diego Wave FC)
2023	(England) Mary Earps (Manchester United)	(England) Lucy Bronze (Barcelona) (Spain) Olga Carmona (Real Madrid) (England) Alex Greenwood (Manchester City)	(England) Ella Toone (Manchester United) (England) Keira Walsh (Barcelona) (Spain) Aitana Bonmatí (Barcelona)	(England) Lauren James (Chelsea) (Australia) Sam Kerr (Chelsea) (United States) Alex Morgan (San Diego Wave FC) (England) Alessia Russo (Manchester United/Arsenal)

=== FIFA Women's World 11 ===
From the 2024 edition onward, FIFA independently manages their own award, The Best FIFA Women's World 11.

Year	Goalkeeper	Defenders	Midfielders	Forwards
2024	(United States) Alyssa Naeher (Chicago Red Stars)	(England) Lucy Bronze (Barcelona)/(Chelsea) (United States) Naomi Girma (San Diego Wave) (Spain) Irene Paredes (Barcelona) (Spain) Ona Batlle (Barcelona)	(Brazil) Gabi Portilho (Corinthians) (Spain) Patri Guijarro (Barcelona) (United States) Lindsey Horan (Lyon) (Spain) Aitana Bonmatí (Barcelona)	(Norway) Caroline Graham Hansen (Barcelona) (Spain) Salma Paralluelo (Barcelona)
2025	(England) Hannah Hampton (Chelsea)	(Spain) Ona Batlle (Barcelona) (Spain) Irene Paredes (Barcelona) (England) Leah Williamson (Arsenal) (England) Lucy Bronze (Chelsea)	(Spain) Alexia Putellas (Barcelona) (Spain) Patri Guijarro (Barcelona) (Spain) Aitana Bonmatí (Barcelona)	(Spain) Clàudia Pina (Barcelona) (England) Alessia Russo (Arsenal) (Spain) Mariona Caldentey (Arsenal)

== Mixed awards ==
=== FIFA Fair Play Award ===
Year	Winner
2016	(Colombia) Atlético Nacional
2017	(Togo) Francis Koné
2018	(Germany) Lennart Thy
2019	(Argentina) Marcelo Bielsa (England) Leeds United
2020	(Italy) Mattia Agnese
2021	Denmark national team and medical staff
2022	(Georgia (country)) Luka Lochoshvili
2023	Brazil national team
2024	(Brazil) Thiago Maia
2025	(Germany) Andreas Harlass-Neuking

=== FIFA Puskás Award (until 2023) ===
Year	Rank	Player	Team	Opponent
2016	1st	(Malaysia) Mohd Faiz Subri	(Malaysia) Penang	(Malaysia) Pahang
2016	2nd	(Brazil) Marlone	(Brazil) Corinthians	(Chile) Cobresal
2016	3rd	(Venezuela) Daniuska Rodríguez	Venezuela U17	Colombia U17
2017	1st	(France) Olivier Giroud	(England) Arsenal	(England) Crystal Palace
2017	2nd	(South Africa) Oscarine Masuluke	(South Africa) Baroka	(South Africa) Orlando Pirates
2017	3rd	(Venezuela) Deyna Castellanos	Venezuela U17	Cameroon U17
2018	1st	(Egypt) Mohamed Salah	(England) Liverpool	(England) Everton
2018	2nd	(Portugal) Cristiano Ronaldo	(Spain) Real Madrid	(Italy) Juventus
2018	3rd	(Uruguay) Giorgian De Arrascaeta	(Brazil) Cruzeiro	(Brazil) América Mineiro
2019	1st	(Hungary) Dániel Zsóri	(Hungary) Debrecen	(Hungary) Ferencváros
2019	2nd	(Argentina) Lionel Messi	(Spain) Barcelona	(Spain) Real Betis
2019	3rd	(Colombia) Juan Fernando Quintero	(Argentina) River Plate	(Argentina) Racing
2020	1st	(South Korea) Son Heung-min	(England) Tottenham Hotspur	(England) Burnley
2020	2nd	(Uruguay) Giorgian de Arrascaeta	(Brazil) Flamengo	(Brazil) Ceará
2020	3rd	(Uruguay) Luis Suárez	(Spain) Barcelona	(Spain) Mallorca
2021	1st	(Argentina) Erik Lamela	(England) Tottenham Hotspur	(England) Arsenal
2021	2nd	(Iran) Mehdi Taremi	(Portugal) Porto	(England) Chelsea
2021	3rd	(Czech Republic) Patrik Schick	Czech Republic	Scotland
2022	1st	(Poland) Marcin Oleksy	(Poland) Warta Poznań	(Poland) Stal Rzeszów
2022	2nd	(France) Dimitri Payet	(France) Marseille	(Greece) PAOK
2022	3rd	(Brazil) Richarlison	Brazil	Serbia
2023	1st	(Brazil) Guilherme Madruga	(Brazil) Botafogo-SP	(Brazil) Novorizontino
2023	2nd	(Portugal) Nuno Santos	(Portugal) Sporting	(Portugal) Boavista
2023	3rd	(Paraguay) Julio Enciso	(England) Brighton & Hove Albion	(England) Manchester City

=== FIFA Fan Award ===
Year	Winner
2016	Borussia Dortmund and Liverpool supporters
2017	Celtic supporters
2018	Peru supporters
2019	Silvia Grecco, Palmeiras supporter
2020	Marivaldo Francisco da Silva, Sport Recife supporter
2021	Denmark and Finland supporters
2022	Argentina supporters
2023	Hugo Daniel Iñíguez, Colon de Santa Fe supporter
2024	Guilherme Gandra Moura, Gabriel Pec fan
2025	Zakho SC supporters

=== FIFA Special Award for an Outstanding Career Achievement ===
Year	Winner	Notes
2016	(Brazil) Falcão	for his amazing contribution to futsal
2021	(Canada) Christine Sinclair	for breaking the record of most international goals scored by a female footballer
2021	(Portugal) Cristiano Ronaldo	for breaking the record of most international goals scored by a male footballer
2022	(Brazil) Pelé	Tribute and special recognition for contribution to football
2023	(Brazil) Marta	Special recognition for contribution to women's football

== Awards by year ==
- The Best FIFA Football Awards 2016
- The Best FIFA Football Awards 2017
- The Best FIFA Football Awards 2018
- The Best FIFA Football Awards 2019
- The Best FIFA Football Awards 2020
- The Best FIFA Football Awards 2021
- The Best FIFA Football Awards 2022
- The Best FIFA Football Awards 2023
- The Best FIFA Football Awards 2024
- The Best FIFA Football Awards 2025

== Awards by name ==
- The Best FIFA Men's Player
- The Best FIFA Women's Player
- The Best FIFA Men's Coach
- The Best FIFA Women's Coach
- The Best FIFA Men's Goalkeeper
- The Best FIFA Women's Goalkeeper
- The FIFA Puskás Award
- The FIFA Fair Play Award
- The FIFA Fan Award
- FIFA FIFPRO Men's World 11
- FIFA FIFPRO Women's World 11

== See also ==
- Ballon d'Or
- FIFA Ballon d'Or
- FIFA World Player of the Year
- FIFA World Player Gala
