= FOTY =

FOTY may refer to:

- Footballer of the Year (disambiguation)
- Ring Magazine fights of the year
