= Woty =

Woty, WotY or WOTY may refer to:

== Awards ==
- Wikimedian of the Year
- Woman of the Year Award, several awards
- Word of the year, several awards

== Surname ==
- William Woty (1731?–1791), English law clerk and hack writer
