= Ona Batlle =

Spanish footballer (born 1999)

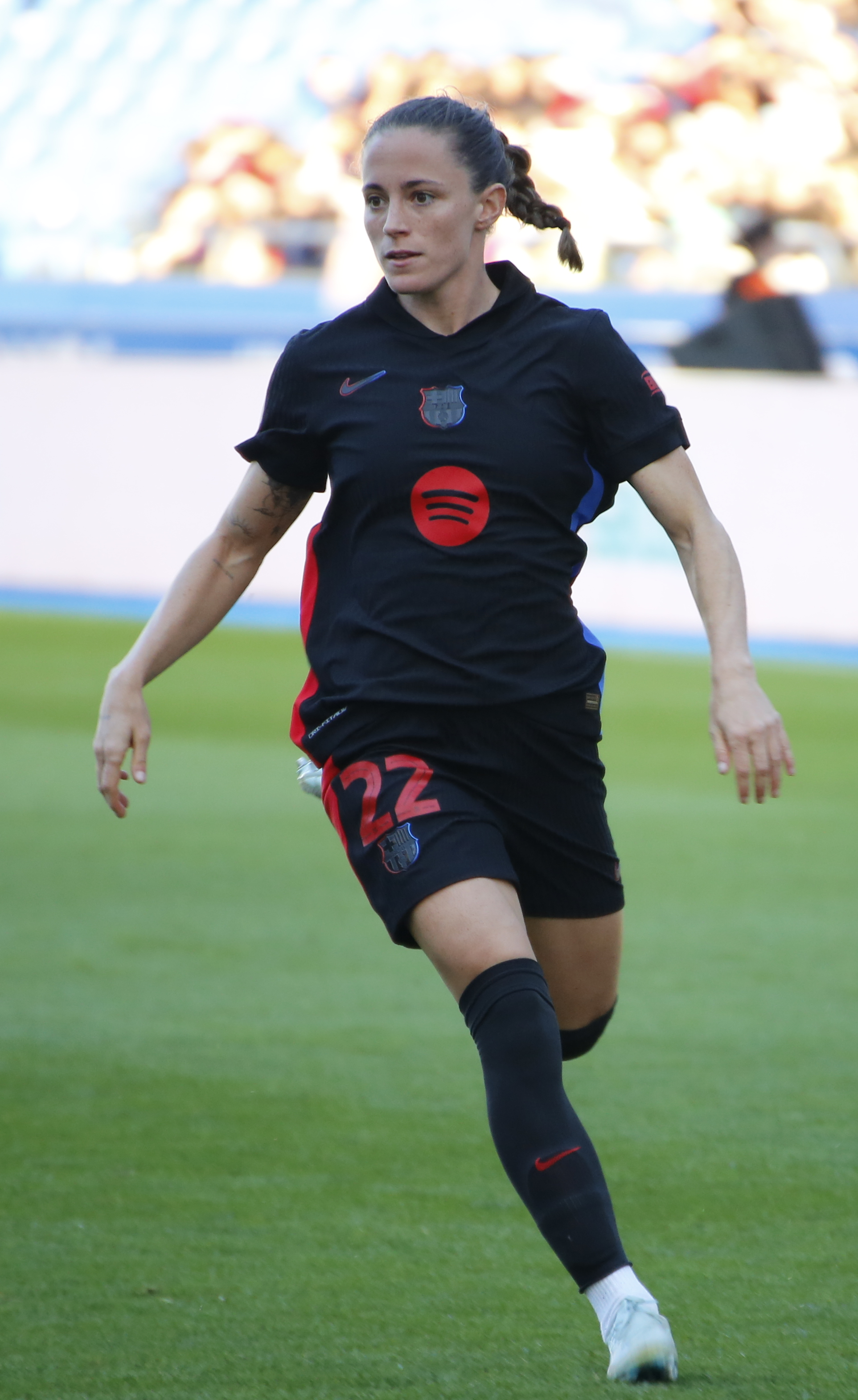
- Batlle with Barcelona in 2024

Personal information
- Full name: Ona Batlle Pascual
- Date of birth: 10 June 1999 (age 27)
- Place of birth: Vilassar de Mar, Spain
- Height: 1.60 m (5 ft 3 in)
- Position: Full-back

Team information
- Current team: Arsenal
- Number: 22

Youth career
- 2011–2014: Barcelona

Senior career*
| Years | Team | Apps | (Gls) |
| 2014–2017 | Barcelona B | | |
| 2016–2017 | Barcelona | 0 | (0) |
| 2017–2018 | Madrid CFF | 28 | (0) |
| 2018–2020 | Levante | 39 | (3) |
| 2020–2023 | Manchester United | 59 | (2) |
| 2023–2026 | Barcelona | 66 | (9) |
| 2026– | Arsenal | 9 | (0) |

International career^{‡}
| 2015–2016 | Spain U17 | 24 | (2) |
| 2017–2018 | Spain U19 | 13 | (0) |
| 2018 | Spain U20 | 1 | (0) |
| 2019– | Spain | 78 | (2) |
| 2019– | Catalonia | 1 | (0) |
Medal record
Women's football
Representing Spain
FIFA Women's World Cup
| Winner | 2023 Australia–New Zealand |
UEFA Women's Championship
| Runner-up | 2025 Switzerland |
UEFA Women's Nations League
| Winner | 2024 France–Netherlands–Spain |
FIFA U-20 Women's World Cup
| Runner-up | 2018 France |
UEFA Women's Under-19 Championship
| Winner | 2017 Northern Ireland |
FIFA U-17 Women's World Cup
| Third place | 2016 Jordan |
UEFA Women's Under-17 Championship
| Winner | 2015 Iceland |
| Runner-up | 2016 Belarus |
- * Club domestic league appearances and goals as of 15 November 2026 ‡ National team caps and goals as of 13 October 2026

Ona Batlle Pascual (born 10 June 1999) is a Spanish professional footballer who plays as a full-back for Women's Super League club Arsenal and the Spain national team. She has previously played for Madrid CFF, Levante and Barcelona, in addition to English club Manchester United.

== Club career ==
=== Youth career ===
Batlle was born on 10 June 1999 in Vilassar de Mar, a town in the province of Barcelona, and started to play football with Vilassar de Mar. In 2011, she was scouted by FC Barcelona during a match with the Catalonia under-12 team. She joined FC Barcelona's youth program La Masia and progressed through the ranks, earning promotion to Barcelona B, Barcelona's highest-level youth team which played in the Segunda División, in 2014. On 9 November 2016, Batlle was called up to the first team and was an unused substitute in Barcelona's Champions League game against FC Twente.

In the summer of 2017, Barcelona changed focus to recruiting high-profile senior players, making it more difficult for youth players to break through to the first team. Batlle was one of seven La Masia players to leave in the summer to pursue senior first-team opportunities with other clubs. On her departure, Batlle remarked she will not rule out a return to the club that "formed her."

=== Madrid CFF ===
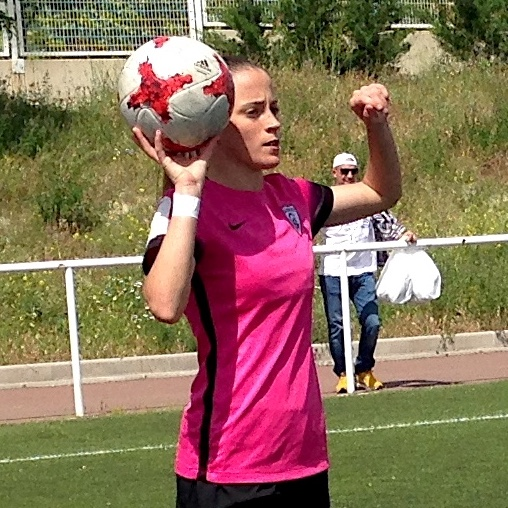
Batlle with Madrid CFF in 2018

Batlle signed to Madrid CFF in July 2017, the club's first signing following their promotion to the Primera División. She made her senior debut during the club's first Primera División match, as a halftime substitute for Laura del Río in a 1–1 draw with Levante. Batlle cemented her place as a starter during the season, playing in 28 of the 30 league matches including 26 starts as Madrid CFF ended their first Primera División campaign mid-table in tenth place.

=== Levante ===
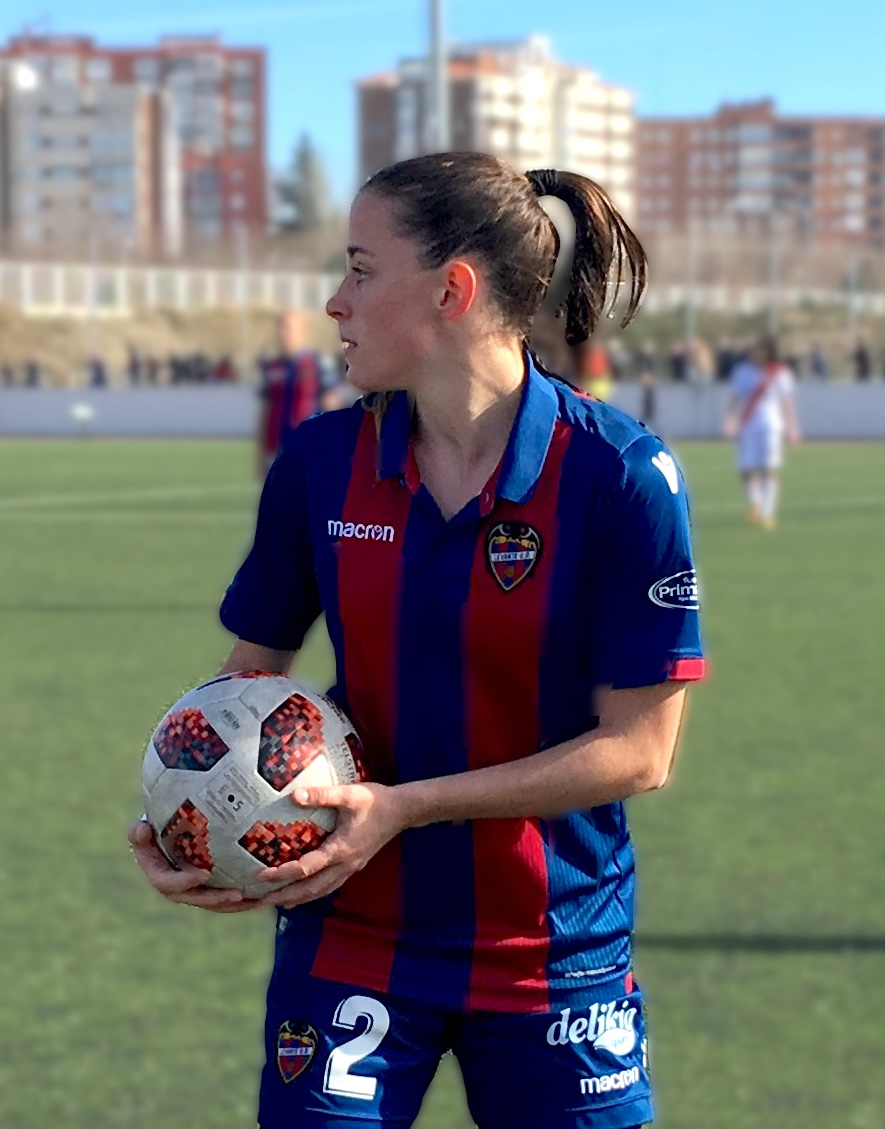
Batlle with Levante in 2019

After one season with Madrid, Batlle signed with Levante in June 2018. However, prior to the start of the season Batlle suffered an injury at the FIFA U-20 World Cup in August, delaying her debut for the club. She eventually made her first Levante appearance as a substitute in a 3–2 win away to former club Madrid CFF on 5 December 2018. Batlle scored her first Primera División goal in a 4–2 win over Logroño on 22 December 2018.

On 24 June 2020, Batlle released a statement that she was not going to renew her contract with Levante and would instead become a free agent. She remained as one of 17 players in a class action lawsuit against the Association of Women's Football Clubs (ACFF) and the Association of Spanish Football Players (AFE) at the time, disputing the use of the Compensation List that would inflate the fee necessary for other Primera División to sign allocated players as free agents. Batlle's compensation was set at €500,000.

=== Manchester United ===
On 13 July 2020, Batlle signed a two-year contract with an option for a third with English FA WSL club Manchester United. She made her debut on 6 September 2020, starting in the season opener as United drew 1–1 with defending champions Chelsea. In total, Batlle appeared in 23 of United's 27 games during the season and was named Women's Player of the Year at the end of the campaign.

In the first league game of the 2021–22 season, Batlle scored her first goal for the club in a 2–0 win against Reading. She made 21 league appearances in the 2021–22 campaign and was recognised with PFA Team of the Year honours. Before her contract expiration, United wanted her to stay and offered her several increased contracts, but Batlle made the decision to return to Barcelona.

=== Barcelona ===
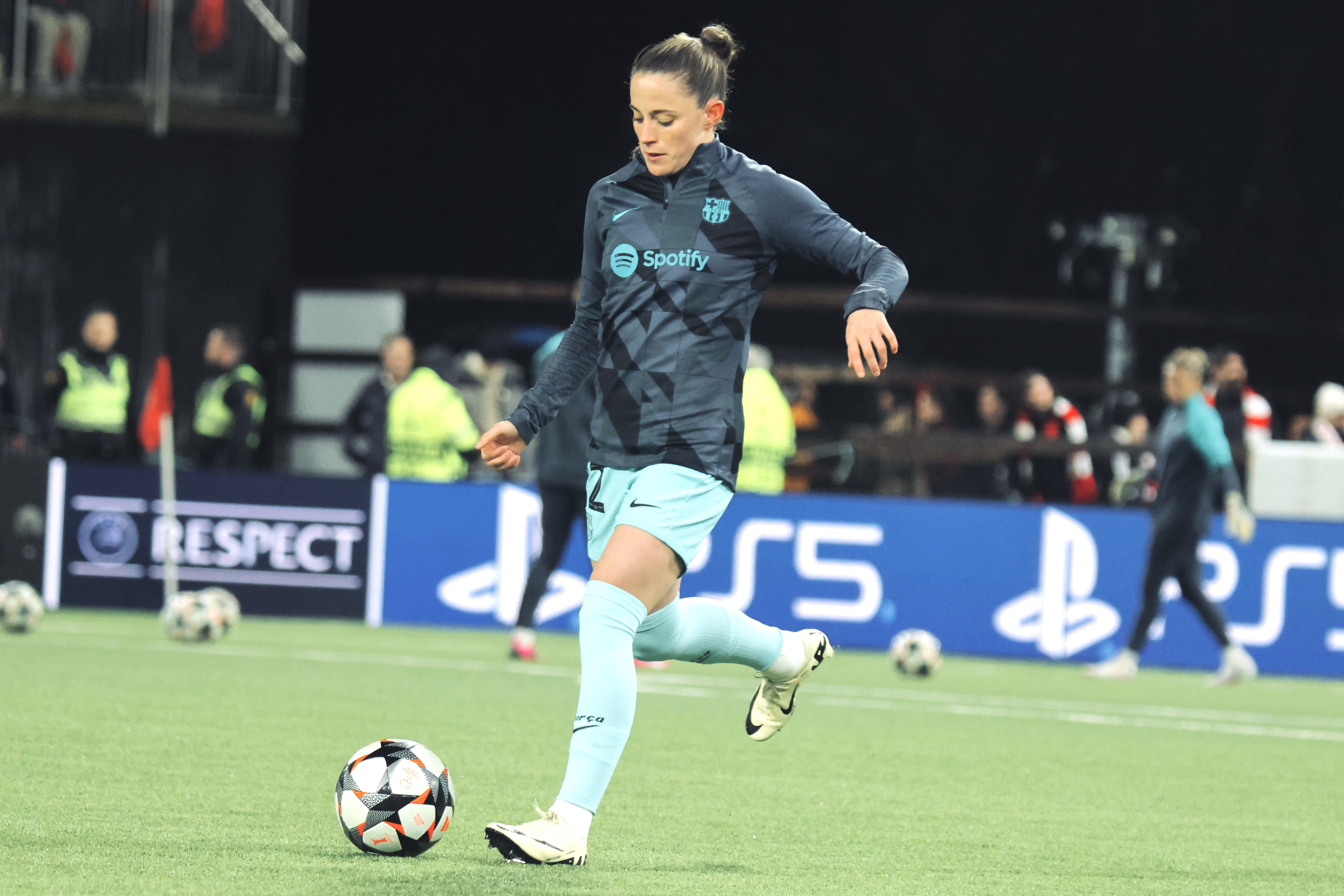
Batlle with Barcelona in March 2024

On 19 June 2023, it was announced that Batlle had joined Barcelona on a three-year deal following the end of her contract with Manchester United, considered a homecoming. During the season, she played as wing-back on both sides and flourished, showing a high level of physicality and quality. She departed the club at the end of the 2025–26 season after winning 12 titles.

=== Arsenal ===
On 10 July 2026, it was announced that Batlle had returned to the Women's Super League, joining Arsenal in a four-year deal with an option for a further year. She would wear the number 22 jersey.

== International career ==
=== Youth ===
Batlle has represented Spain at under-17, under-19 and under-20 level including at five major youth tournaments: two UEFA Women's Under-17 Championship editions (2015 and 2016), the 2016 FIFA U-17 Women's World Cup, the 2017 UEFA Women's Under-19 Championship and the 2018 FIFA U-20 Women's World Cup.

Spain won the 2015 UEFA Women's Under-17 Championship, beating Switzerland 5–2 in the final. Batlle started in four of the five games in the tournament. They finished as runners-up at the 2016 edition, losing to Germany on penalties in the final. Batlle started every game for Spain at the tournament. The result automatically qualifying Spain for the 2016 FIFA U-17 Women's World Cup. Batlle started five of the six games including all of the knockout round as Spain finished third, losing to Japan in the semi-finals before beating Venezuela in the third-place playoff.

In July 2017, Batlle was selected by Pedro López to represent Spain at the 2017 UEFA Women's Under-19 Championship. Spain won the tournament with a stoppage time goal from Patricia Guijarro against France. Batlle again started every game in the tournament and she was one of seven Spanish players selected to the team of the tournament. The result also qualified Spain for the 2018 FIFA U-20 Women's World Cup. Batlle only ended up playing one match at the World Cup, sustaining an injury against Paraguay in the opening match that ended her tournament. Teammate Patricia Guijarro dedicated her goal against the United States to Batlle by holding up her shirt to the camera and the fans. Spain finished as runners-up, losing 3–1 to Japan in the final.

=== Senior ===
On 17 May 2019, Batlle made her senior debut in a friendly against Cameroon, substituting in for Eunate Arraiza at halftime. She was left out of the 23-player roster for the 2019 FIFA Women's World Cup three days later.

In February 2020, Batlle was called up to Spain's squad for her first senior international tournament opportunity, the 2020 SheBelieves Cup. She started the first two matches of the tournament, a 3–1 win against Japan and a narrow 1–0 loss to the reigning World Champion United States as Spain finished second in their debut SheBelieves appearance.

She was among Las 15, a group of players who made themselves unavailable for international selection in September 2022 due to their dissatisfaction with head coach Jorge Vilda, but one of three who was selected for the tournament squad nine months later. She played the entirety of the 2023 FIFA Women's World Cup final as Spain defeated England 1–0 to win the trophy for the first time.

On 10 June 2025, Batlle was called up to the Spain squad for the UEFA Women's Euro 2025.

== Personal life ==
During her time in Manchester, Batlle lived with Ivana Fuso. As of 2023, she is in a relationship with former Barcelona teammate Lucy Bronze.

== Career statistics ==
=== Club ===
As of match played 15 November 2026

Appearances and goals by club, season and competition
| Club | Season | League | | | National cup (Note: Includes the Copa de la Reina and FA Cup) | | League cup (Note: Includes the Supercopa de España and FA Women's League Cup) | | Continental (Note: Includes the UEFA Champions League) | | Total | |
| Club | Season | Division | Apps | Goals | Apps | Goals | Apps | Goals | Apps | Goals | Apps | Goals |
|---|---|---|---|---|---|---|---|---|---|---|---|---|
| Madrid CFF | 2017–18 | Primera División | 28 | 0 | 0 | 0 | — | | — | | 28 | 0 |
| Levante | 2018–19 | Primera División | 19 | 1 | 1 | 0 | — | | — | | 20 | 1 |
| Levante | 2019–20 | Primera División | 20 | 2 | 1 | 0 | 1 | 0 | — | | 22 | 2 |
| Levante | Total | | 39 | 3 | 2 | 0 | 1 | 0 | — | | 42 | 3 |
| Manchester United | 2020–21 | WSL | 19 | 0 | 2 | 0 | 2 | 0 | — | | 23 | 0 |
| Manchester United | 2021–22 | WSL | 21 | 1 | 1 | 0 | 5 | 1 | — | | 27 | 2 |
| Manchester United | 2022–23 | WSL | 19 | 1 | 5 | 0 | 3 | 0 | — | | 27 | 1 |
| Manchester United | Total | | 59 | 2 | 8 | 0 | 10 | 1 | — | | 77 | 3 |
| Barcelona | 2023–24 | Liga F | 22 | 3 | 5 | 3 | 2 | 1 | 10 | 0 | 39 | 7 |
| Barcelona | 2024–25 | Liga F | 22 | 4 | 5 | 0 | 3 (Note: Includes 2 games in the Supercopa de España and 1 in the Copa Catalunya) | 0 | 8 | 0 | 38 | 4 |
| Barcelona | 2025–26 | Liga F | 22 | 2 | 4 | 0 | 2 | 1 | 9 | 0 | 37 | 3 |
| Barcelona | Total | | 66 | 9 | 14 | 3 | 7 | 2 | 27 | 0 | 114 | 14 |
| Arsenal | 2026–27 | WSL | 9 | 0 | 0 | 0 | — | | 3 | 0 | 12 | 0 |
| Career total | | | 201 | 14 | 24 | 3 | 18 | 3 | 30 | 0 | 273 | 20 |

=== International ===
As of match played 13 October 2026

Appearances and goals by national team and year
| National team | Year | Apps | Goals |
|---|---|---|---|
| Spain | 2019 | 3 | 0 |
| Spain | 2020 | 3 | 0 |
| Spain | 2021 | 11 | 0 |
| Spain | 2022 | 11 | 0 |
| Spain | 2023 | 14 | 1 |
| Spain | 2024 | 15 | 1 |
| Spain | 2025 | 14 | 0 |
| Spain | 2026 | 7 | 0 |
| Total | | 78 | 2 |

Scores and results list Spain's goal tally first, score column indicates score after each Batlle goal.

List of international goals scored by Ona Batlle
| No. | Date | Venue | Opponent | Score | Result | Competition |
|---|---|---|---|---|---|---|
| 1 | 5 July 2023 | Gladsaxe Stadium, Gladsaxe, Denmark | Denmark | 1–0 | 2–0 | Friendly |
| 2 | 3 February 2024 | Estadio de La Cartuja, Seville, Spain | Netherlands | 2–0 | 3–0 | 2023–24 UEFA Women's Nations League |

== Honours ==
Barcelona B

- Segunda División, group III: 2015–16, 2016–17

Barcelona

- Liga F: 2023–24, 2024–25, 2025–26
- Copa de la Reina: 2017, 2023–24, 2024–25, 2025–26
- Supercopa de España Femenina: 2023–24, 2024–25, 2025–26
- UEFA Women's Champions League: 2023–24, 2025–26; runner-up: 2024–25

Manchester United

- Women's FA Cup runner-up: 2022–23

Spain U17

- FIFA U-17 Women's World Cup third place: 2016
- UEFA Women's Under-17 Championship: 2015; runner-up: 2016

Spain U19

- UEFA Women's Under-19 Championship: 2017

Spain U20

- FIFA U-20 Women's World Cup runner-up: 2018

Spain

- FIFA Women's World Cup: 2023
- UEFA Women's Championship runner-up: 2025
- UEFA Women's Nations League: 2023–24, 2025
- SheBelieves Cup: runner-up: 2020

Individual

- PFA WSL Team of the Year: 2021–22, 2022–23
- PFA WSL Fans' Player of the Year: 2022–23
- PFA WSL Fans' Player of the Month: February 2023
- UEFA Women's Under-17 Championship Team of the Tournament: 2016
- UEFA Women's Under-19 Championship Team of the Tournament: 2017
- Manchester United Women's Player of the Year: 2020–21
- The Best FIFA Women's 11: 2024, 2025
- FIFA FIFPRO Women's World 11: 2025
- Primera División Team of the Year: 2024–25, 2025-26
