= The Best FIFA Men's Player =

International football award

- Presented by: FIFA
- Formerly called: FIFA World Player of the Year (1991–2009); FIFA Ballon d'Or (2010–2015)
- First award: 2016
- Current holder: (France) Ousmane Dembélé (1st award)

Highlights
- Most awards: (Argentina) Lionel Messi (3 awards)
- Website: fifa.com

The Best FIFA Men's Player is an association football award presented annually by the sport's governing body, FIFA, since 2016, to honour the player deemed to have performed the best over the previous calendar year. The award was formerly known as the FIFA World Player of the Year, which was merged with France Football's Ballon d'Or in 2010 to become the FIFA Ballon d'Or in a six-year partnership.

== History ==
In 2010, the FIFA World Player of the Year award combined with the Ballon d'Or to create the FIFA Ballon d'Or in a six-year partnership. FIFA presided over the FIFA Ballon d'Or after agreeing to pay £13million for the merge of the two major player awards with France Football. The six editions of the FIFA Ballon d'Or were dominated by Lionel Messi and Cristiano Ronaldo, as part of their ongoing rivalry. In 2016, the Ballon d’Or again lost its "FIFA" tag and would be voted for exclusively by journalists, while the FIFA World Player of the Year award – which ran from 1991 to 2009 – was resurrected, this time as The Best FIFA Men's Player.

According to reports, FIFA's decision not to renew the deal was made in order to improve the organization's strained relationship with England's FA. This was based on the fact the annual ceremony was held in Zürich – and new FIFA president Gianni Infantino wanted to move the next one to London.

The trophy was designed by Croatian artist Ana Barbić Katičić.

=== Criteria and voting ===
The selection criteria for the players of the year are sporting performance, as well as general conduct on and off the pitch.

The votes are decided by media representatives, national team coaches, and national team captains. In October 2016, it was announced that the general public would also be allowed to vote. Each group has 25% of the overall vote.

== Winners ==
Year	Rank	Player	Team	Votes
2016	1st	(Portugal) Cristiano Ronaldo	(Spain) Real Madrid	34.54%
2016	2nd	(Argentina) Lionel Messi	(Spain) Barcelona	26.42%
2016	3rd	(France) Antoine Griezmann	(Spain) Atlético Madrid	7.53%
2017	1st	(Portugal) Cristiano Ronaldo	(Spain) Real Madrid	43.16%
2017	2nd	(Argentina) Lionel Messi	(Spain) Barcelona	19.25%
2017	3rd	(Brazil) Neymar (Note: Neymar was signed by Paris Saint-Germain from Barcelona midway through 2017.)	(France) Paris Saint-Germain	6.97%
2018	1st	(Croatia) Luka Modrić	(Spain) Real Madrid	29.05%
2018	2nd	(Portugal) Cristiano Ronaldo (Note: Cristiano Ronaldo was signed by Juventus from Real Madrid midway through 2018.)	(Italy) Juventus	19.08%
2018	3rd	(Egypt) Mohamed Salah	(England) Liverpool	11.23%
2019	1st	(Argentina) Lionel Messi	(Spain) Barcelona	46
2019	2nd	(Netherlands) Virgil van Dijk	(England) Liverpool	38
2019	3rd	(Portugal) Cristiano Ronaldo	(Italy) Juventus	36
2020	1st	(Poland) Robert Lewandowski	(Germany) Bayern Munich	52
2020	2nd	(Portugal) Cristiano Ronaldo	(Italy) Juventus	38
2020	3rd	(Argentina) Lionel Messi	(Spain) Barcelona	35
2021	1st	(Poland) Robert Lewandowski	(Germany) Bayern Munich	48
2021	2nd	(Argentina) Lionel Messi (Note: Lionel Messi was signed by Paris Saint-Germain from Barcelona midway through 2021.)	(France) Paris Saint-Germain	44
2021	3rd	(Egypt) Mohamed Salah	(England) Liverpool	39
2022	1st	(Argentina) Lionel Messi	(France) Paris Saint-Germain	52
2022	2nd	(France) Kylian Mbappé	(France) Paris Saint-Germain	44
2022	3rd	(France) Karim Benzema	(Spain) Real Madrid	34
2023	1st	(Argentina) Lionel Messi (Note: Lionel Messi was signed by Inter Miami from Paris Saint-Germain midway through 2023.)	(United States) Inter Miami	48 (Note: As per the Rules of Allocation (art. 12), Lionel Messi (Argentina) won the Award on the basis of the votes cast by the men's national-team captains.)
2023	2nd	(Norway) Erling Haaland	(England) Manchester City	48
2023	3rd	(France) Kylian Mbappé	(France) Paris Saint-Germain	35
2024	1st	(Brazil) Vinícius Júnior	(Spain) Real Madrid	48
2024	2nd	(Spain) Rodri	(England) Manchester City	43
2024	3rd	(England) Jude Bellingham	(Spain) Real Madrid	37
2025	1st	(France) Ousmane Dembélé	(France) Paris Saint-Germain	50
2025	2nd	(Spain) Lamine Yamal	(Spain) Barcelona	39
2025	3rd	(France) Kylian Mbappé	(Spain) Real Madrid	35

=== Wins by player ===
Player	Winner	Runner-up	Third place
(Argentina) Lionel Messi	3 (2019, 2022, 2023)	3 (2016, 2017, 2021)	1 (2020)
(Portugal) Cristiano Ronaldo	2 (2016, 2017)	2 (2018, 2020)	1 (2019)
(Poland) Robert Lewandowski	2 (2020, 2021)	—	—
(Croatia) Luka Modrić	1 (2018)	—	—
(Brazil) Vinícius Júnior	1 (2024)	—	—
(France) Ousmane Dembélé	1 (2025)	—	—
(France) Kylian Mbappé	—	1 (2022)	2 (2023, 2025)
(Netherlands) Virgil van Dijk	—	1 (2019)	—
(Norway) Erling Haaland	—	1 (2023)	—
(Spain) Rodri	—	1 (2024)	—
(Spain) Lamine Yamal	—	1 (2025)	—
(Egypt) Mohamed Salah	—	—	2 (2018, 2021)
(France) Antoine Griezmann	—	—	1 (2016)
(Brazil) Neymar	—	—	1 (2017)
(France) Karim Benzema	—	—	1 (2022)
(England) Jude Bellingham	—	—	1 (2024)

=== Wins by country ===
Country	Players	Total
Argentina	1	3
Poland	1	2
Portugal	1	2
Brazil	1	1
Croatia	1	1
France	1	1

=== Wins by club ===
Club	Players	Total
(Spain) Real Madrid	3	4
(France) Paris Saint Germain	2	2
(Germany) Bayern Munich	1	2
(Spain) Barcelona	1	1
(United States) Inter Miami	1	1

== FIFA Player of the Year (including predecessors) ==
Players	FIFA World Player of the Year (1991–2009)	FIFA Ballon d'Or (2010–2015)	The Best FIFA Men's Player (2016–present)	Total
(Argentina) Lionel Messi	1	4	3	8
(Portugal) Cristiano Ronaldo	1	2	2	5
(Brazil) Ronaldo	3	—	—	3
(France) Zinedine Zidane	3	—	—	3
(Brazil) Ronaldinho	2	—	—	2
(Poland) Robert Lewandowski	—	—	2	2
(Germany) Lothar Matthäus	1	—	—	1
(Netherlands) Marco van Basten	1	—	—	1
(Italy) Roberto Baggio	1	—	—	1
(Brazil) Romário	1	—	—	1
(Liberia) George Weah	1	—	—	1
(Brazil) Rivaldo	1	—	—	1
(Portugal) Luís Figo	1	—	—	1
(Italy) Fabio Cannavaro	1	—	—	1
(Brazil) Kaká	1	—	—	1
(Croatia) Luka Modrić	—	—	1	1
(Brazil) Vinícius Júnior	—	—	1	1
(France) Ousmane Dembélé	—	—	1	1

== See also ==
- The Best FIFA Football Awards
- The Best FIFA Women's Player
- FIFA World Player of the Year
- FIFA Ballon d'Or
- Ballon d'Or
