= Woman of the Year (disambiguation) =

Woman of the Year (1942) is an American romantic comedy-drama film starring Spencer Tracy and Katharine Hepburn.

Woman of the Year may also refer to:

== Arts and entertainment ==
- Little Mother (1973 film), released in some regions under the title Woman of the Year
- Woman of the Year (1976 film), a 1976 comedy TV movie directed by Jud Taylor
- Woman of the Year (musical), musical adaptation of the film
- Woman of the Year (Parks and Recreation), an episode of the television show
- "Woman of the Year" (song), by Calvin Harris from the 2022 album Funk Wav Bounces Vol. 2

== Awards ==
- Arab Woman of the Year Award
- Billboard Woman of the Year, by Billboard magazine
- Daily Life Woman of the Year, a defunct Australian awards by The Sydney Morning Herald
- Hasty Pudding Woman of the Year, by Hasty Pudding Theatricals of Harvard University
- Los Angeles Times Women of the Year Silver Cup, award presented between 1950 and 1977
- NCAA Woman of the Year Award
- Woman of the Year Awards awarded by Glamour magazine
- Women of the Year Lunch

== See also ==
- Women of the Year Lunch
- Person of the Year
- Year of the Woman
- Man of the Year (disambiguation)
