= Footballer of the Year =

Footballer of the Year may refer to:

== Association football ==
=== World ===
- FIFA World Player of the Year (1991–2009)
- FIFA Ballon d'Or (2010–2015)
- The Best FIFA Men's Player (since 2016)

=== Other ===
- African Footballer of the Year
- Asian Footballer of the Year
- Ballon d'Or, or European Footballer of the Year
- Best Footballer in Asia
- CONCACAF Awards, for CONCACAF Player of the Year
- Footballer of the Year (Germany)
- FWA Footballer of the Year, England
- Oceania Footballer of the Year
- South American Footballer of the Year

== Gaelic football ==
- All Stars Footballer of the Year
- GPA Footballer of the Year
- Texaco Footballer of the Year

== See also ==
- Category:Association football trophies and awards
