= Le Monde Person of the Year =

In 2009 the French newspaper Le Monde initiated a Person of the Year designation for the man or woman of that year who had affected the world's most significantly, either positively or negatively.

- 2009: President Luiz Inácio Lula da Silva, President of Brazil. Lula "knew exactly how to be a democratic figure and fight against poverty", and was described as "a referent to emerging countries and also to the developing world". Other candidates included US President Barack Obama, Russian Prime Minister Vladimir Putin and Iranian President Mahmoud Ahmadinejad.
- 2010: Julian Assange, Australian editor of WikiLeaks.
- 2012: Bashar al-Assad, President of Syria.
