= Man of the Year (disambiguation) =

Man of the Year is an award commonly given by news organizations.

Man of the Year may also refer to:

== Film and television ==
- Man of the Year (1971 film), a comedy film by Marco Vicario
- Man of the Year (1995 film), a mockumentary by Dirk Shafer
- Man of the Year (2002 film), a film starring John Ritter
- The Man of the Year (2003 film), or O Homem do Ano, a Brazilian film featuring Wagner Moura
- Man of the Year (2006 film), starring Robin Williams
- "The Man of the Year", 2006 episode of The O.C. season 3

== Music ==
- Man of the Year (album), a 2015 album by Skales
- Man of the Year, a 2016 album by Dareysteel
- "Man of the Year" (Schoolboy Q song), 2013
- "Man of the Year" (Lorde song), 2025
- "Man of the Year", a 1977 song by The Models
- "Man of the Year", a 1999 song by Len from You Can't Stop the Bum Rush
- "Man of the Year", a 2007 song by Drake from Comeback Season
- "Man of the Year", a 2013 song by Logic from Young Sinatra: Welcome to Forever
- "Man of the Year", a 2013 song by Phyno from No Guts No Glory
- "Man of the Year", a 2016 song by Dance Gavin Dance from Mothership
- "Man of the Year", a 2020 song by Juice Wrld from Legends Never Die
