= The Best FIFA Football Awards 2021 =

International football awards

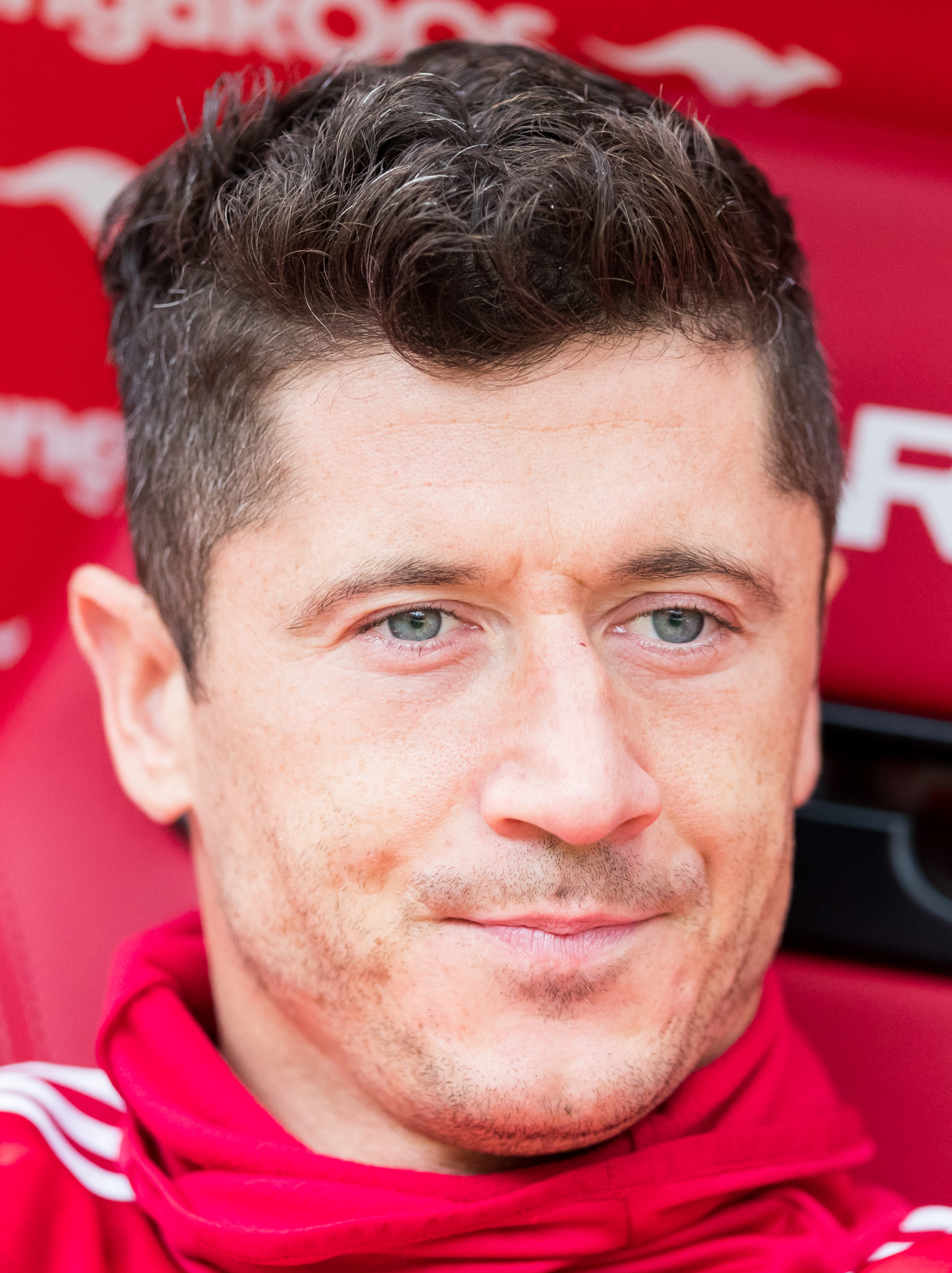
- Robert Lewandowski, The Best FIFA Men's Player 2021
- Date: 17 January 2022
- Presented by: FIFA
- Hosted by: Jermaine Jenas and Reshmin Chowdhury

Highlights
- The Best FIFA Player: Men's: (Poland) Robert Lewandowski; Women's: (Spain) Alexia Putellas
- The Best FIFA Coach: Men's: (Germany) Thomas Tuchel; Women's: (England) Emma Hayes
- The Best FIFA Goalkeeper: Men's: (Senegal) Édouard Mendy; Women's: (Chile) Christiane Endler
- FIFA Puskás Award: (Argentina) Erik Lamela
- The Best FIFA Special Award: (Portugal) Cristiano Ronaldo (Canada) Christine Sinclair
- Website: fifa.com

The Best FIFA Football Awards 2021 were held on 17 January 2022. The ceremony was held virtually due to the ongoing COVID-19 pandemic.

== Winners and nominees ==
=== The Best FIFA Men's Player ===
Eleven players were initially shortlisted on 22 November 2021. The three finalists were revealed on 7 January 2022.

Robert Lewandowski won the award with 48 rank points, his second consecutive win.

The selection criteria for the men's players of the year was: respective achievements during the period from 8 October 2020 to 7 August 2021.

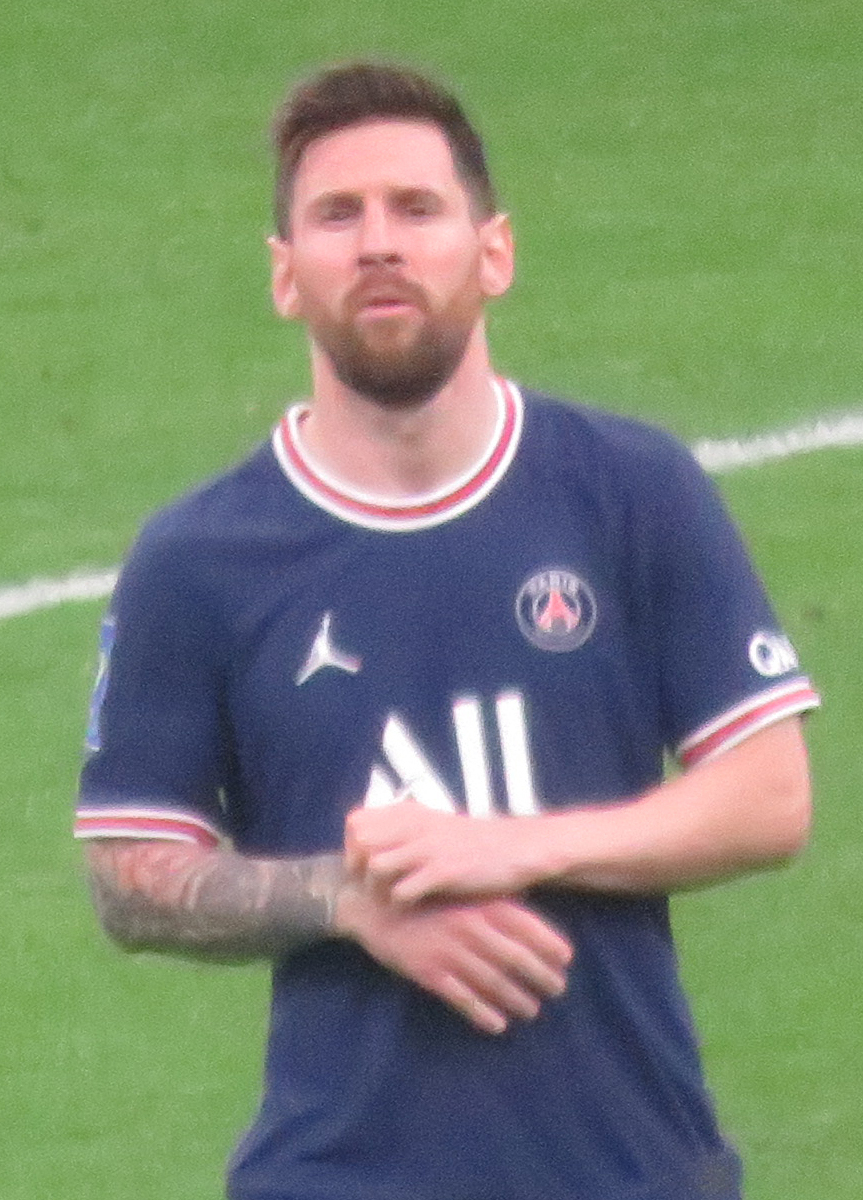
Lionel Messi

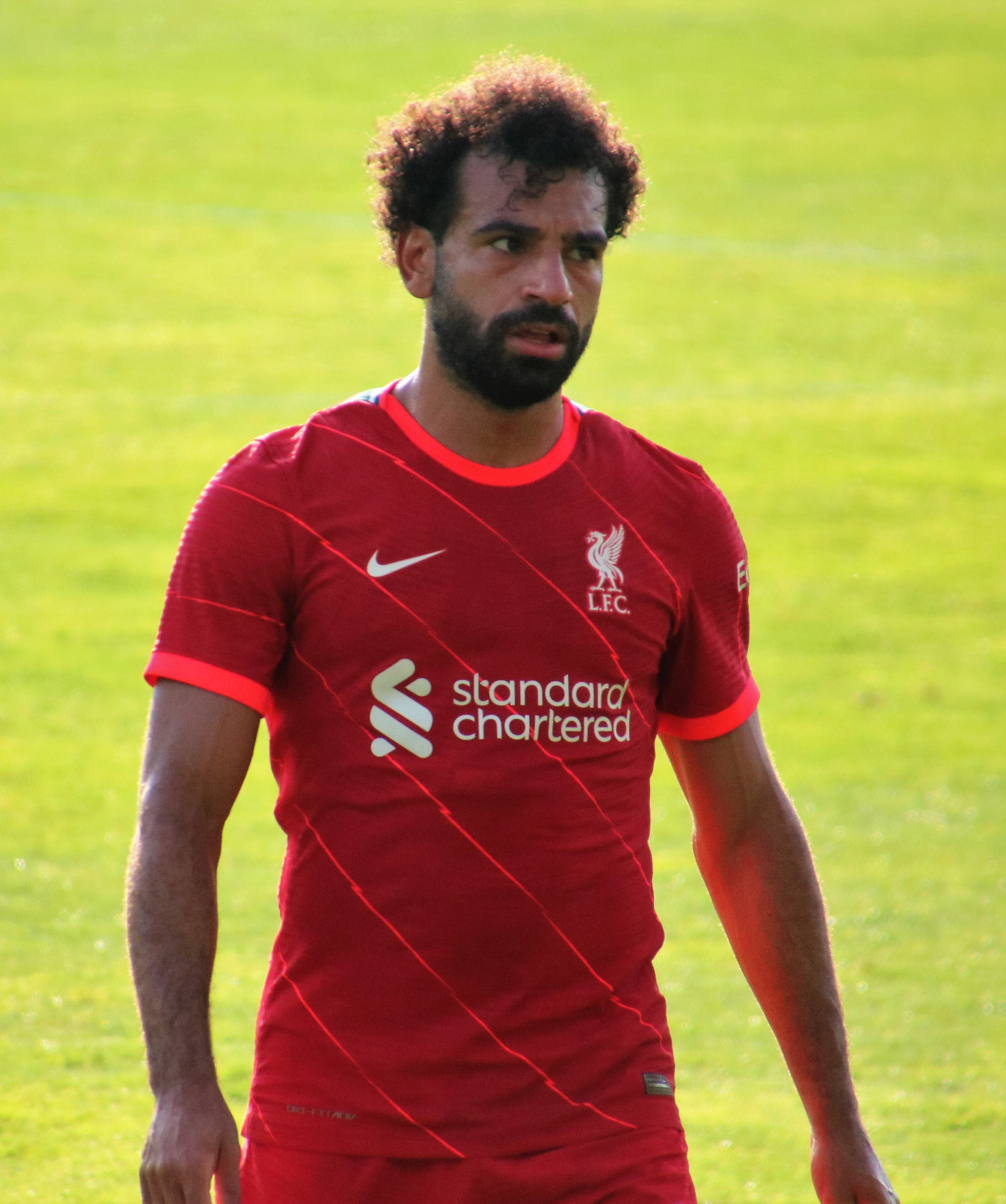
Mohamed Salah

Rank	Player	Club(s) played for	National team	Points
The finalists
1	Robert Lewandowski	(Germany) Bayern Munich	Poland	48
2	Lionel Messi	(Spain) Barcelona; (France) Paris Saint-Germain	Argentina	44
3	Mohamed Salah	(England) Liverpool	Egypt	39
Other candidates
4	Karim Benzema	(Spain) Real Madrid	France	30
5	N'Golo Kanté	(England) Chelsea	France	24
6	Jorginho	(England) Chelsea	Italy	24
7	Cristiano Ronaldo	(Italy) Juventus; (England) Manchester United	Portugal	23
8	Kylian Mbappé	(France) Paris Saint-Germain	France	16
9	Kevin De Bruyne	(England) Manchester City	Belgium	11
10	Neymar	(France) Paris Saint-Germain	Brazil	10
11	Erling Haaland	(Germany) Borussia Dortmund	Norway	7

=== The Best FIFA Men's Goalkeeper ===
Five players were initially shortlisted on 22 November 2021. The three finalists were revealed on 5 January 2022.

Édouard Mendy won the award with 24 rank points.

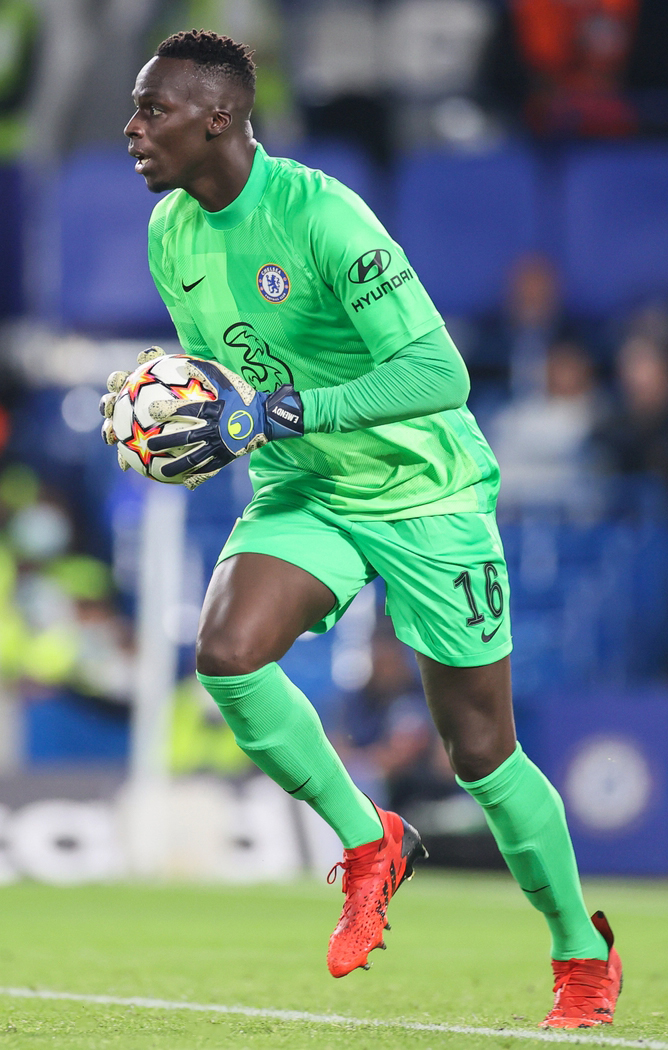
Édouard Mendy

Rank	Player	Club(s) played for	National team	Points
The finalists
1	Édouard Mendy	(England) Chelsea	Senegal	24
2	Gianluigi Donnarumma	(Italy) Milan; (France) Paris Saint-Germain	Italy	24
3	Manuel Neuer	(Germany) Bayern Munich	Germany	12
Other candidates
4	Alisson	(England) Liverpool	Brazil	8
5	Kasper Schmeichel	(England) Leicester City	Denmark	4

=== The Best FIFA Men's Coach ===
Seven coaches were initially shortlisted on 22 November 2021. The three finalists were revealed on 6 January 2022.

Thomas Tuchel won the award with 28 rank points.

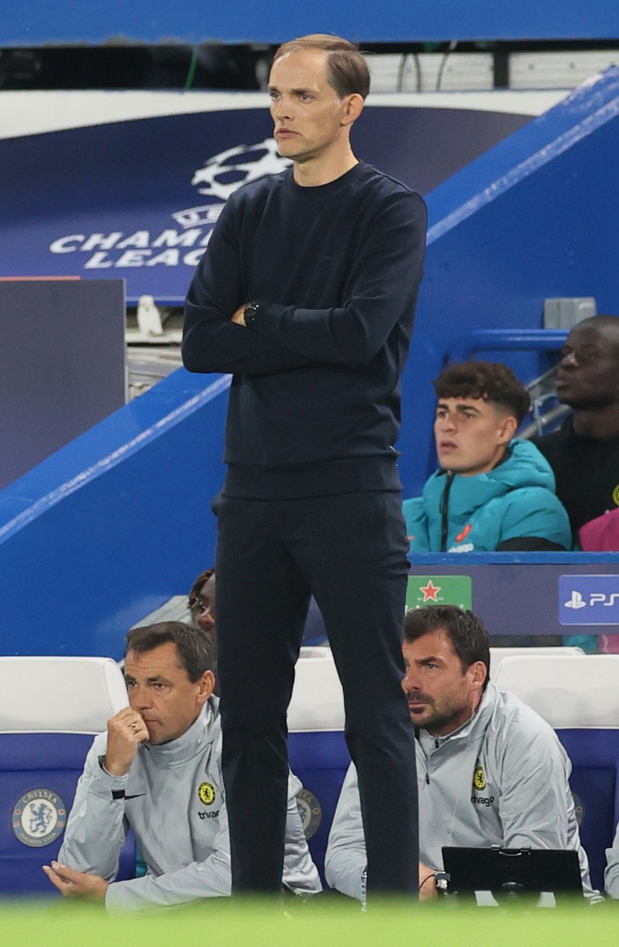
Thomas Tuchel

Rank	Coach	Team(s) managed	Points
The finalists
1	(Germany) Thomas Tuchel	(England) Chelsea	28
2	(Italy) Roberto Mancini	Italy	15
3	(Spain) Pep Guardiola	(England) Manchester City	14
Other candidates
4	(Argentina) Lionel Scaloni	Argentina	7
5	(Germany) Hansi Flick	(Germany) Bayern Munich; Germany	6
6	(Argentina) Diego Simeone	(Spain) Atlético Madrid	1
7	(Italy) Antonio Conte	(Italy) Inter Milan; (England) Tottenham Hotspur	1

=== The Best FIFA Women's Player ===
Thirteen players were initially shortlisted on 22 November 2021. The three finalists were revealed on 7 January 2022.

Alexia Putellas won the award with 52 rank points.

The selection criteria for the women's players of the year was: respective achievements during the period from 8 October 2020 to 6 August 2021.

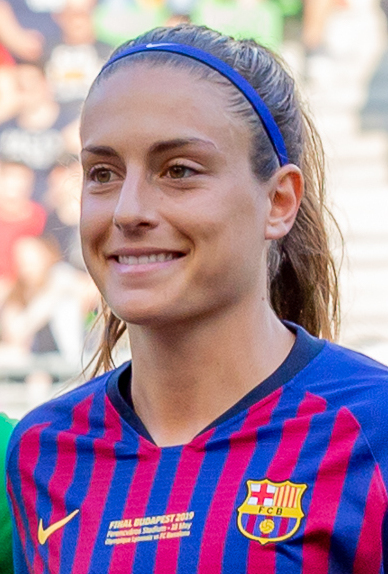
Alexia Putellas

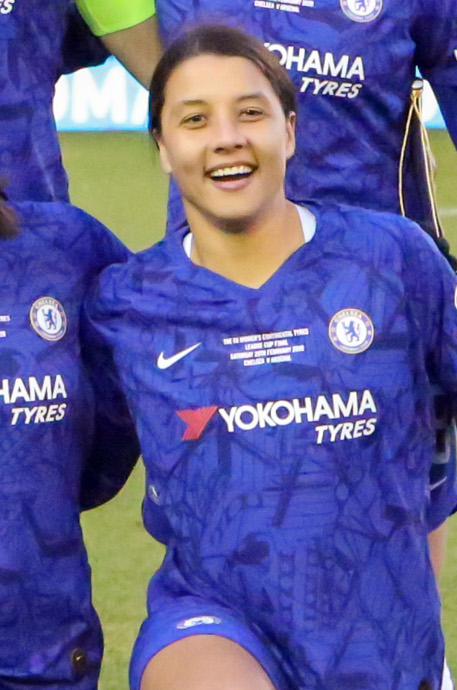
Sam Kerr

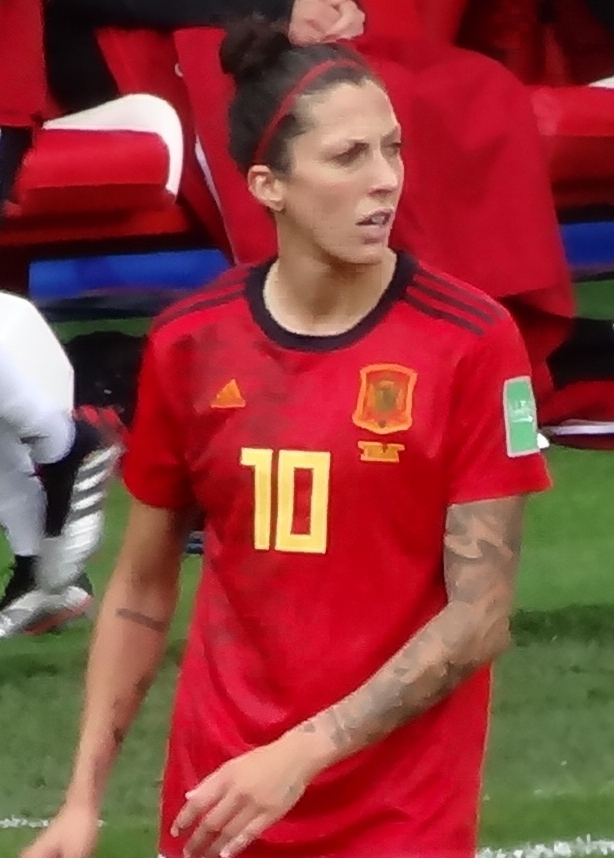
Jennifer Hermoso

Rank	Player	Club(s) played for	National team	Points
The finalists
1	Alexia Putellas	(Spain) Barcelona	Spain	52
2	Sam Kerr	(England) Chelsea	Australia	38
3	Jennifer Hermoso	(Spain) Barcelona	Spain	33
Other candidates
4	Vivianne Miedema	(England) Arsenal	Netherlands	30
5	Christine Sinclair	(United States) Portland Thorns	Canada	28
6	Aitana Bonmatí	(Spain) Barcelona	Spain	26
7	Lucy Bronze	(England) Manchester City	England	16
8	Magdalena Eriksson	(England) Chelsea	Sweden	15
9	Caroline Graham Hansen	(Spain) Barcelona	Norway	12
10	Pernille Harder	(England) Chelsea	Denmark	10
11	Ellen White	(England) Manchester City	England	9
12	Stina Blackstenius	(Sweden) BK Häcken; (England) Arsenal	Sweden	5
13	Ji So-yun	(England) Chelsea	South Korea	4

=== The Best FIFA Women's Goalkeeper ===
Five players were initially shortlisted on 22 November 2021. The three finalists were revealed on 5 January 2022.

Christiane Endler won the award with 26 rank points.

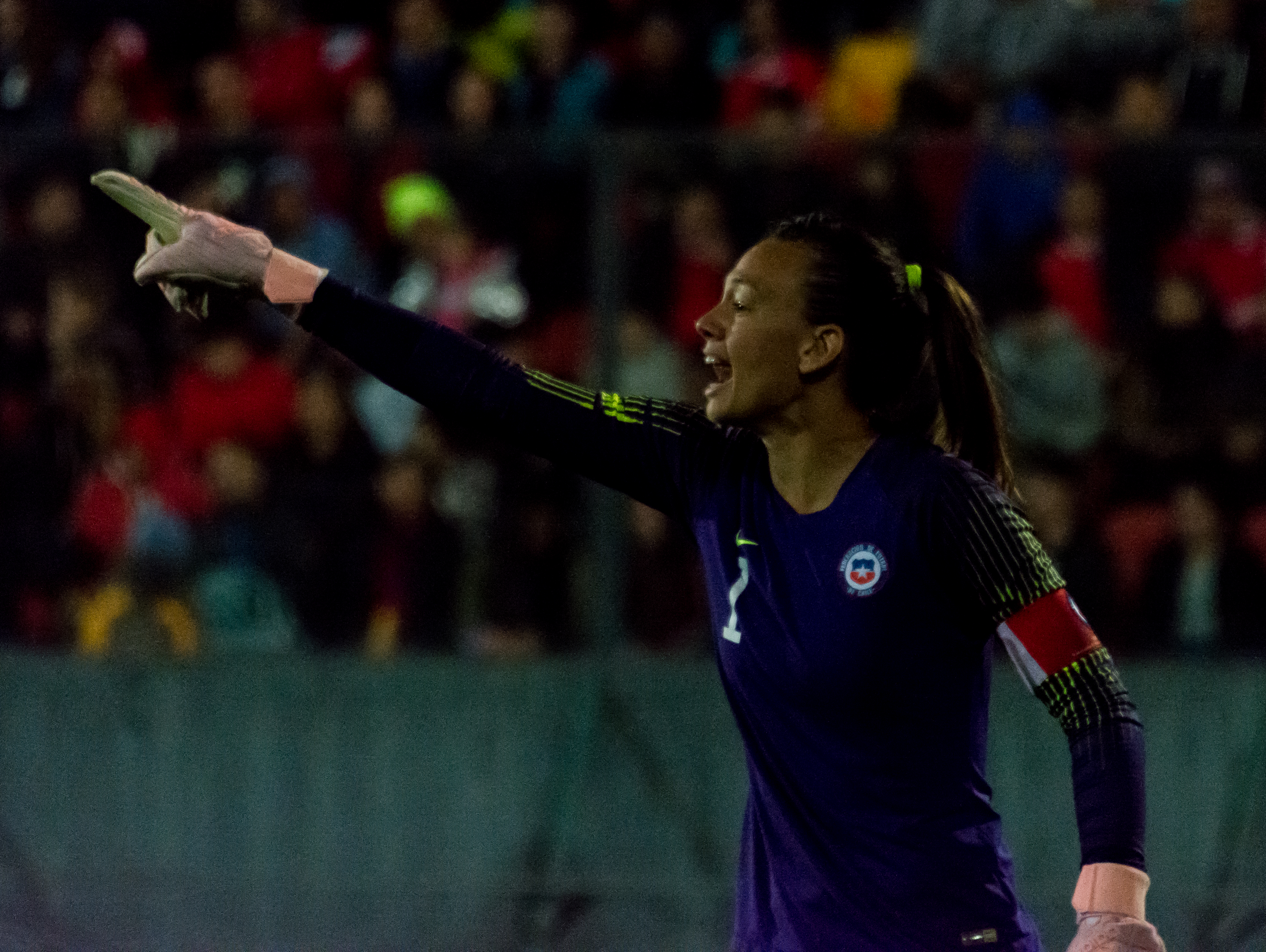
Christiane Endler

Rank	Player	Club(s) played for	National team	Points
The finalists
1	Christiane Endler	(France) Paris Saint-Germain; (France) Lyon	Chile	26
2	Stephanie Labbé	(Sweden) FC Rosengård; (France) Paris Saint-Germain	Canada	20
3	Ann-Katrin Berger	(England) Chelsea	Germany	14
Other candidates
4	Hedvig Lindahl	(Spain) Atlético Madrid	Sweden	7
5	Alyssa Naeher	(United States) Chicago Red Stars	United States	5

=== The Best FIFA Women's Coach ===
Five coaches were initially shortlisted on 22 November 2021. The three finalists were revealed on 6 January 2022.

Emma Hayes won the award with 22 rank points.

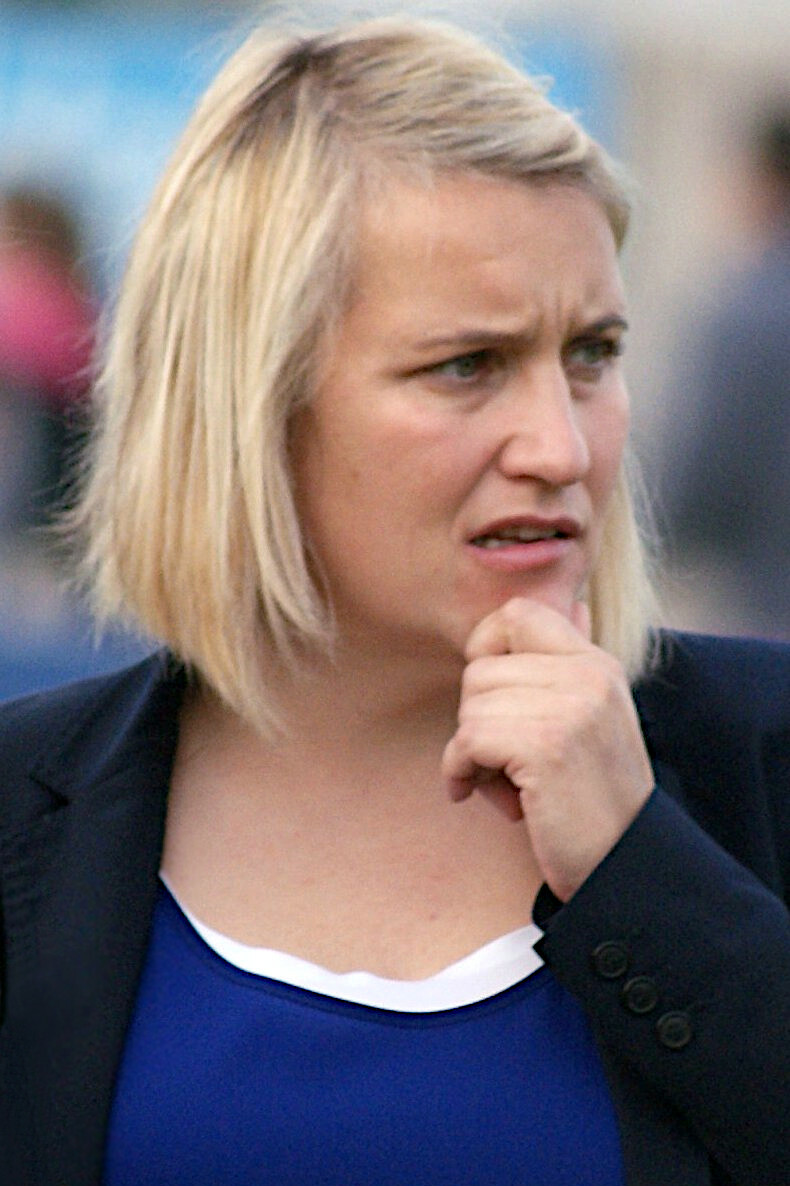
Emma Hayes

Rank	Coach	Team(s) managed	Points
The finalists
1	(England) Emma Hayes	(England) Chelsea	22
2	(Spain) Lluís Cortés	(Spain) Barcelona; Ukraine	19
3	(Netherlands) Sarina Wiegman	Netherlands; England	14
Other candidates
4	(England) Bev Priestman	Canada	13
5	(Sweden) Peter Gerhardsson	Sweden	4

=== FIFA Puskás Award ===
The eleven players initially shortlisted for the award were announced on 29 November 2021. The three finalists were revealed on 4 January 2022. All goals up for consideration were scored from 8 October 2020 to 7 August 2021. Every registered FIFA.com user was allowed to participate in the final vote until 17 December 2021, with the questionnaire being presented on the official website of FIFA. The selected goals were also voted on by a panel of ten "FIFA experts". Both groups' votes weighed equally on the ultimate winner of the award.

Erik Lamela won the award with 22 rank points.

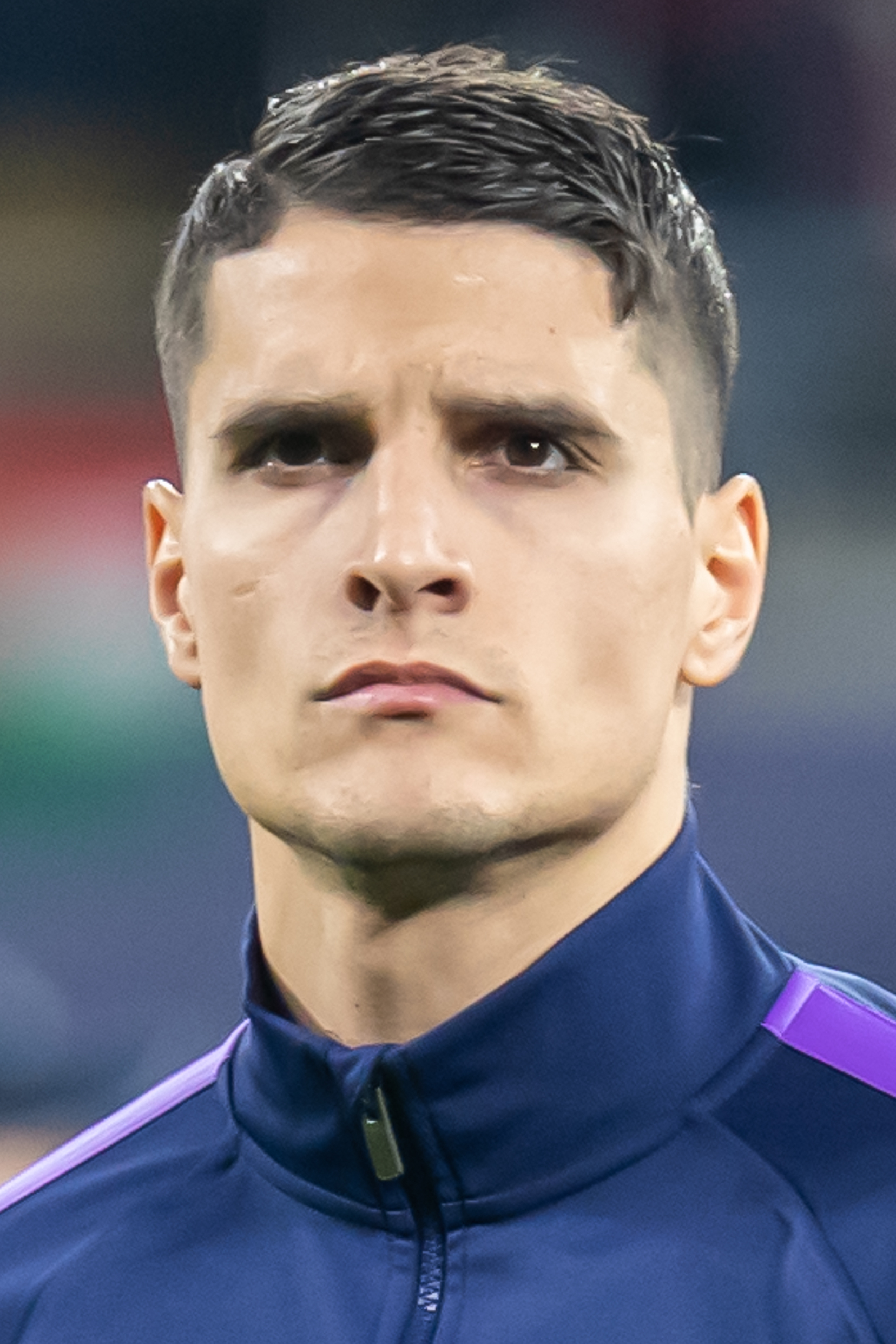
Erik Lamela

Rank	Player	Match	Competition	Date	Points
The finalists
1	(Argentina) Erik Lamela	Arsenal – Tottenham Hotspur	2020–21 Premier League	14 March 2021	22
2	(Iran) Mehdi Taremi	Chelsea – Porto	2020–21 UEFA Champions League	13 April 2021	21
3	(Czech Republic) Patrik Schick	Scotland – Czech Republic	UEFA Euro 2020	14 June 2021	21
Other candidates
Unranked	(Colombia) Luis Díaz	Brazil – Colombia	2021 Copa América	23 June 2021	N/A
Unranked	(France) Gauthier Hein	Niort – Auxerre	2020–21 Ligue 2	10 April 2021	N/A
Unranked	(Austria) Valentino Lazaro	Bayer Leverkusen – Borussia Mönchengladbach	2020–21 Bundesliga	8 November 2020	N/A
Unranked	(Algeria) Riyad Mahrez	Zimbabwe – Algeria	2021 Africa Cup of Nations qualification	16 November 2020	N/A
Unranked	(Ghana) Sandra Owusu-Ansah	Kumasi Sports Academy Ladies – Supreme Ladies	2020–21 Ghana Women's Premier League	8 May 2021	N/A
Unranked	(Greece) Vangelis Pavlidis	Willem II – Fortuna Sittard	2020–21 Eredivisie	16 May 2021	N/A
Unranked	(Mexico) Daniela Sánchez	Querétaro – Atlético San Luis	Liga MX Femenil Guardianes 2021	16 January 2021	N/A
Unranked	(Scotland) Caroline Weir	Manchester City – Manchester United	2020–21 FA WSL	12 February 2021	N/A

=== FIFA Fan Award ===
The award celebrates the best fan moments or gestures of October 2020 to August 2021, regardless of championship, gender or nationality. The shortlist was compiled by a panel of FIFA experts, and every registered FIFA.com user was allowed to participate in the final vote until 14 January 2022.

The three nominees were announced on 22 November 2021. Denmark and Finland fans won the award with over 100,000 registered votes.

Rank	Fan(s)	Match	Competition	Date	Votes
1	Denmark and Finland fans	Denmark – Finland	UEFA Euro 2020	12 June 2021	107,565
2	Imogen Papworth-Heidel	N/A	N/A	Various	77,887
3	German football fans	N/A	N/A	Various	70,229

=== FIFA Fair Play Award ===
Winner	Team	Reason
Denmark national team/Danish medical team and staff	Denmark	Gave Christian Eriksen CPR, shielded him from cameras and comforted his family following his collapse during a Euro 2020 match

=== The Best FIFA Special Award ===
An additional award was given out to Portugal's Cristiano Ronaldo and Canada's Christine Sinclair, to recognize them becoming the all-time leading international goalscorers in men and women's senior football, respectively.

Winner	Team	Reason
Cristiano Ronaldo	Portugal	Broke the record of most international goals scored by a male footballer
Christine Sinclair	Canada	Broke the record of most international goals scored by a female footballer

=== FIFA FIFPRO Men's World 11 ===
The 23–player men's shortlist was announced on 14 December 2021.

The players chosen were Gianluigi Donnarumma as goalkeeper, David Alaba, Leonardo Bonucci and Rúben Dias as defenders, Kevin De Bruyne, Jorginho and N'Golo Kanté as midfielders, and Erling Haaland, Robert Lewandowski, Lionel Messi and Cristiano Ronaldo as forwards.

2021 FIFA FIFPRO Men's World 11

Player	Club(s)
Goalkeeper
(Italy) Gianluigi Donnarumma	(Italy) Milan; (France) Paris Saint-Germain
Defenders
(Austria) David Alaba	(Germany) Bayern Munich; (Spain) Real Madrid
(Italy) Leonardo Bonucci	(Italy) Juventus
(Portugal) Rúben Dias	(England) Manchester City
Midfielders
(Belgium) Kevin De Bruyne	(England) Manchester City
(Italy) Jorginho	(England) Chelsea
(France) N'Golo Kanté	(England) Chelsea
Forwards
(Norway) Erling Haaland	(Germany) Borussia Dortmund
(Poland) Robert Lewandowski	(Germany) Bayern Munich
(Argentina) Lionel Messi	(Spain) Barcelona; (France) Paris Saint-Germain
(Portugal) Cristiano Ronaldo	(Italy) Juventus; (England) Manchester United

Other nominees

Player	Club(s)
Goalkeepers
(Brazil) Alisson	(England) Liverpool
(Senegal) Édouard Mendy	(England) Chelsea
Defenders
(Spain) Jordi Alba	(Spain) Barcelona
(England) Trent Alexander-Arnold	(England) Liverpool
(Brazil) Dani Alves	(Brazil) São Paulo; (Spain) Barcelona
Midfielders
(Spain) Sergio Busquets	(Spain) Barcelona
(Portugal) Bruno Fernandes	(England) Manchester United
(Netherlands) Frenkie de Jong	(Spain) Barcelona
Forwards
(France) Karim Benzema	(Spain) Real Madrid
(Belgium) Romelu Lukaku	(Italy) Inter Milan; (England) Chelsea
(France) Kylian Mbappé	(France) Paris Saint-Germain
(Brazil) Neymar	(France) Paris Saint-Germain

=== FIFA FIFPRO Women's World 11 ===
The 23–player women's shortlist was announced on 14 December 2021.

The players chosen were Christiane Endler as goalkeeper, Millie Bright, Lucy Bronze, Magdalena Eriksson and Wendie Renard as defenders, Estefanía Banini, Barbara Bonansea and Carli Lloyd as midfielders, and Marta, Vivianne Miedema and Alex Morgan as forwards.

2021 FIFA FIFPRO Women's World 11

Player	Club(s)
Goalkeeper
(Chile) Christiane Endler	(France) Paris Saint-Germain; (France) Lyon
Defenders
(England) Millie Bright	(England) Chelsea
(England) Lucy Bronze	(England) Manchester City
(Sweden) Magdalena Eriksson	(England) Chelsea
(France) Wendie Renard	(France) Lyon
Midfielders
(Argentina) Estefanía Banini	(Spain) Levante; (Spain) Atlético Madrid
(Italy) Barbara Bonansea	(Italy) Juventus
(United States) Carli Lloyd	(United States) NJ/NY Gotham FC
Forwards
(Brazil) Marta	(United States) Orlando Pride
(Netherlands) Vivianne Miedema	(England) Arsenal
(United States) Alex Morgan	(England) Tottenham Hotspur; (United States) Orlando Pride; (United States) San Diego Wave FC

Other nominees

Player	Club(s)
Goalkeepers
(Germany) Laura Benkarth	(Germany) Bayern Munich
(Germany) Ann-Katrin Berger	(England) Chelsea
Defenders
(Canada) Kadeisha Buchanan	(France) Lyon
(Australia) Ellie Carpenter	(France) Lyon
(Spain) Irene Paredes	(France) Paris Saint-Germain; (Spain) Barcelona
Midfielders
(Spain) Aitana Bonmatí	(Spain) Barcelona
(France) Delphine Cascarino	(France) Lyon
(Spain) Alexia Putellas	(Spain) Barcelona
Forwards
(Denmark) Pernille Harder	(England) Chelsea
(Australia) Sam Kerr	(England) Chelsea
(Cameroon) Gabrielle Onguéné	(Russia) CSKA Moscow
(United States) Megan Rapinoe	(United States) OL Reign

== Selection panels ==
=== Men's selection panel ===
The panel of experts who shortlisted the nominees for The Best FIFA Football Awards 2021 for the men's players and coaches comprised:

- (Oman) Ali Al-Habsi
- (Mexico) Jared Borgetti
- (Australia) Tim Cahill
- (Brazil) Júlio César
- (Cameroon) Geremi
- (Germany) Jürgen Klinsmann
- (United States) Alexi Lalas
- (Argentina) Javier Mascherano
- (New Zealand) Ryan Nelsen
- (France) David Trezeguet

=== Women's selection panel ===
The panel of experts who shortlisted the nominees for The Best FIFA Football Awards 2021 for the women's players and coaches comprised:

- (Kenya) Florence Adhiambo
- (Papua New Guinea) Margaret Aka
- (England) Eniola Aluko
- (Republic of Ireland) Emma Byrne
- (United States) April Heinrichs
- (Brazil) Rosana
- (Ghana) Memunatu Sulemana
- (Japan) Homare Sawa
- (Spain) Marta Tejedor
- (Hong Kong) Chan Yuen Ting
