= The Best FIFA Football Awards 2025 =

International football awards

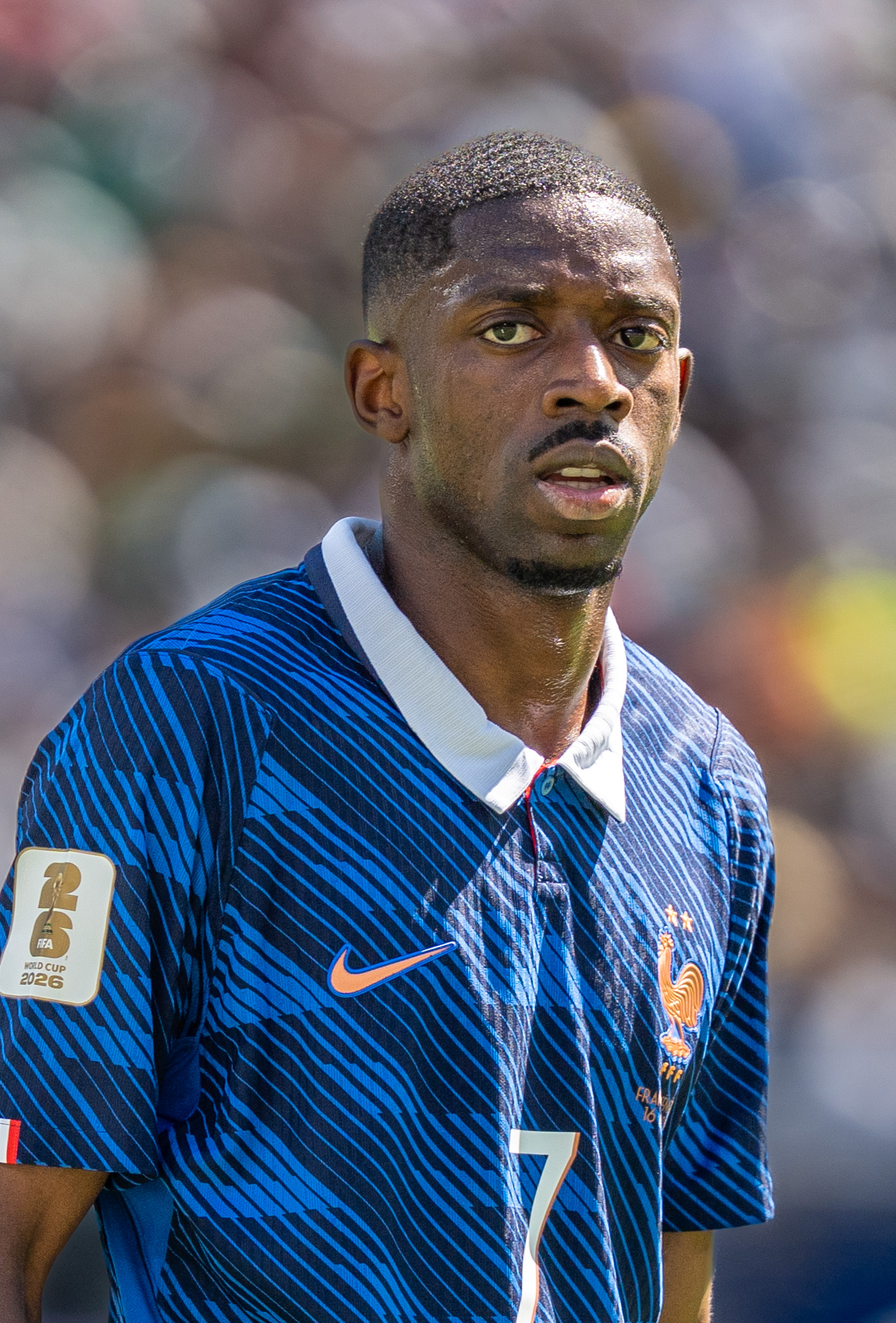
- Ousmane Dembélé, The Best FIFA Men's Player 2025
- Date: 16 December 2025
- Presented by: FIFA

Highlights
- The Best FIFA Player: Men's: (France) Ousmane Dembélé; Women's: (Spain) Aitana Bonmatí
- The Best FIFA Coach: Men's: (Spain) Luis Enrique; Women's: (Netherlands) Sarina Wiegman
- The Best FIFA Goalkeeper: Men's: (Italy) Gianluigi Donnarumma; Women's: (England) Hannah Hampton
- FIFA Puskás Award: (Argentina) Santiago Montiel
- FIFA Marta Award: (Mexico) Lizbeth Ovalle
- Website: fifa.com

The Best FIFA Football Awards 2025 were held on 16 December 2025. The nominees for all categories were announced on 6 November 2025.

== Changes ==
The most substantial change was the restructuring of the FIFA Best 11 squads. After FIFA and FIFPRO ended their joint operation of the "World 11" (which had been in place since 2009), FIFA introduced a new voting pattern. The process moved to a longlist format for each area of the pitch (goalkeepers, defenders, midfielders, and forwards), featuring a total of 68 nominees for 2025. Fan votes were officially integrated into the selection of the Best 11, weighted equally with the expert panel. The 11th spot is no longer simply the next highest-voted player. The new rules require three defenders, three midfielders, and two forwards to be selected first. The final two wildcard spots are given to the next most-voted outfield players, provided they represent different positions ensuring a maximum of four in one area and three in another.

== Winners and nominees ==
=== The Best FIFA Men's Player ===
Eleven players were initially shortlisted on 6 November 2025. The three finalists were revealed on 16 December 2025.

For the 2025 edition, the selection criteria for the men's players and coaches shifted to cover achievements during the period from 11 August 2024 to 2 August 2025. This adjusted window was designed to specifically capture the full 2024–25 European season, the UEFA Women's Euro 2025, and the inaugural FIFA Club World Cup held in the United States.

Rank	Player	Club(s) played for	National team	Points
The finalists
1	(France) Ousmane Dembélé	(France) Paris Saint-Germain	France	50
2	(Spain) Lamine Yamal	(Spain) Barcelona	Spain	39
3	(France) Kylian Mbappé	(Spain) Real Madrid	France	35
Other candidates

=== The Best FIFA Men's Goalkeeper ===
Seven players were initially shortlisted on 6 November 2025.

The selection criteria for the men's players and coaches was: respective achievements during the period from 11 August 2024 to 2 August 2025.

Rank	Player	Club(s) played for	National team	Points
The finalists
1	(Italy) Gianluigi Donnarumma	(France) Paris Saint-Germain (England) Manchester City	Italy	28
2	(Belgium) Thibaut Courtois	(Spain) Real Madrid	Belgium	20
3	(Brazil) Alisson	(England) Liverpool	Brazil	9
Other candidates

=== The Best FIFA Men's Coach ===
Five coaches were initially shortlisted on 6 November 2025.

The selection criteria for the men's players and coaches was: respective achievements during the period from 11 August 2024 to 2 August 2025.

Rank	Coach	Team(s) managed
The finalists
1	(Spain) Luis Enrique	(France) Paris Saint-Germain
2	(Germany) Hansi Flick	(Spain) Barcelona
3	(Netherlands) Arne Slot	(England) Liverpool
Other candidates

=== FIFA Puskás Award ===
The eleven players initially shortlisted for the award were announced on 6 November 2025. All goals up for consideration were scored from 11 August 2024 to 2 August 2025.

Rank	Player	Match	Competition	Goal	Points
1st	(Argentina) Santiago Montiel	(Argentina) Independiente 1–0 Independiente Rivadavia (Argentina)	2025 AFA Liga Profesional de Fútbol	1–0	21
2nd	(England) Declan Rice	(England) Arsenal 3–0 Real Madrid (Spain)	2024–25 UEFA Champions League	2–0	17
3rd	(Spain) Lamine Yamal	(Spain) Espanyol 0–2 Barcelona (Spain)	2024–25 La Liga	0–1	17
TBA	(Brazil) Alerrandro	(Brazil) Vitória 2–2 Cruzeiro (Brazil)	2024 Campeonato Brasileiro Série A	2–0	
TBA	(Italy) Alessandro Deiola	(Italy) Cagliari 3–0 Venezia (Italy)	2024–25 Serie A	3–0	
TBA	(Argentina) Pedro de la Vega	(Mexico) Cruz Azul 0–7 Seattle Sounders FC (United States)	2025 Leagues Cup	0–7	
TBA	(Egypt) Amr Nasser	(Egypt) Al Ahly 1–2 Pharco (Egypt)	2024–25 Egyptian League Cup	0–2	
TBA	(Mexico) Carlos Orrantia	(Mexico) Querétaro 1–2 Atlas (Mexico)	Liga MX Clausura 2025	0–1	
TBA	(Brazil) Lucas Ribeiro	(South Africa) Mamelodi Sundowns 3–4 Borussia Dortmund (Germany)	2025 FIFA Club World Cup	1–0	
TBA	(Indonesia) Rizky Ridho	(Indonesia) Persija Jakarta 1–3 Arema (Indonesia)	2024–25 Liga 1	1–0	
TBA	(Portugal) Kévin Rodrigues	(Turkey) Kasımpaşa 3–2 Çaykur Rizespor (Turkey)	2024–25 Süper Lig	1–0	

=== The Best FIFA Women's Player ===
Sixteen players were initially shortlisted on 6 November 2025.

The selection criteria for the women's players and coaches was: respective achievements during the period from 11 August 2024 to 2 August 2025.

Rank	Player	Club(s) played for	National team
The finalists
1st	(Spain) Aitana Bonmatí	(Spain) Barcelona	Spain
2nd	(Spain) Mariona Caldentey	(England) Arsenal	Spain
3rd	(Spain) Alexia Putellas	(Spain) Barcelona	Spain

=== The Best FIFA Women's Goalkeeper ===
Five players were initially shortlisted on 6 November 2025.

The selection criteria for the women's players and coaches was: respective achievements during the period from 11 August 2024 to 2 August 2025.

Rank	Player	Club(s) played for	National team
The finalists
1st	(England) Hannah Hampton	(England) Chelsea	England
2nd	(Spain) Cata Coll	(Spain) Barcelona	Spain
3rd	(Chile) Christiane Endler	(France) Lyon	Chile

=== The Best FIFA Women's Coach ===
Eight coaches were initially shortlisted on 6 November 2025.

The selection criteria for the women's players and coaches was: respective achievements during the period from 11 August 2024 to 2 August 2025.

Rank	Coach	Team(s) managed
The finalists
1st	(Netherlands) Sarina Wiegman	England
2nd	(France) Sonia Bompastor	(England) Chelsea
3rd	(Netherlands) Renée Slegers	(England) Arsenal

=== FIFA Marta Award ===
FIFA announced the list of 11 nominees on 13 November 2025.

Rank	Player	Team	Opponent	Score	Competition
1st	(Mexico) Lizbeth Ovalle	(Mexico) UANL	(Mexico) Guadalajara	1–0	Liga MX Femenil Clausura 2025
TBA	(United States) Jordyn Bugg	(United States) Seattle Reign FC	(United States) North Carolina Courage	1–0	2025 National Women's Soccer League
TBA	(Spain) Mariona Caldentey	(England) Arsenal	(France) Lyon	2–0	2024–25 UEFA Women's Champions League
TBA	(England) Ashley Cheatley	(England) Brentford	(England) Ascot United	1–0	2024–25 Women's FA Cup
TBA	(Australia) Kyra Cooney-Cross	Australia	Germany	1–1	International friendly
TBA	(North Korea) Jon Ryong-jong	North Korea	Argentina	2–0	2024 FIFA U-20 Women's World Cup
TBA	(Brazil) Marta	(United States) Orlando Pride	(United States) Kansas City Current	3–1	2024 National Women's Soccer League
TBA	(Netherlands) Vivianne Miedema	Netherlands	Wales	1–0	UEFA Women's Euro 2025
TBA	(Argentina) Kishi Núñez	Argentina	Costa Rica	1–0	2024 FIFA U-20 Women's World Cup
TBA	(United States) Ally Sentnor	United States	Colombia	2–0	2025 SheBelieves Cup
TBA	(Jamaica) Khadija Shaw	(England) Manchester City	(Sweden) Hammarby	2–1	2024–25 UEFA Women's Champions League

=== FIFA Fan Award ===
The award celebrates the best fan moments or gestures of August 2024 to August 2025, regardless of championship, gender or nationality. The shortlist was compiled by a panel of FIFA experts. The award was chosen by a public vote on FIFA's website.

Rank	Fan(s)
Nominees
1st	Zakho SC supporters

=== FIFA Fair Play Award ===
The Fair Play Award was decided by an expert panel.

Winner
(Germany) Andreas Harlass-Neuking

=== FIFA Men's World 11 ===
The 2025 FIFA Men's World 11 was selected based on players' performances during the period from 11 August 2024 to 2 August 2025.

The players chosen were Gianluigi Donnarumma as goalkeeper, Achraf Hakimi, Willian Pacho, Virgil van Dijk and Nuno Mendes as defenders, Cole Palmer, Jude Bellingham, Vitinha and Pedri as midfielders, and Lamine Yamal and Ousmane Dembélé as forwards.

2025 FIFA Men's World 11

Player	Club(s)
Goalkeeper
(Italy) Gianluigi Donnarumma	(France) Paris Saint-Germain; (England) Manchester City
Defenders
(Morocco) Achraf Hakimi	(France) Paris Saint-Germain
(Ecuador) Willian Pacho	(France) Paris Saint-Germain
(Netherlands) Virgil van Dijk	(England) Liverpool
(Portugal) Nuno Mendes	(France) Paris Saint-Germain
Midfielders
(England) Cole Palmer	(England) Chelsea
(England) Jude Bellingham	(Spain) Real Madrid
(Portugal) Vitinha	(France) Paris Saint-Germain
(Spain) Pedri	(Spain) Barcelona
Forwards
(Spain) Lamine Yamal	(Spain) Barcelona
(France) Ousmane Dembélé	(France) Paris Saint-Germain

=== FIFPRO Women's World 11 ===
The 2025 FIFPRO Women's World 11 was selected through voting by professional women footballers worldwide.

The players chosen were Hannah Hampton as goalkeeper, Ona Batlle, Millie Bright, Lucy Bronze and Leah Williamson as defenders, Aitana Bonmatí, Ghizlane Chebbak and Alexia Putellas as midfielders, and Barbra Banda, Chloe Kelly and Alessia Russo as forwards.

2025 FIFPRO Women's World 11

Player	Club(s)
Goalkeeper
(England) Hannah Hampton	(England) Chelsea
Defenders
(Spain) Ona Batlle	(Spain) Barcelona
(England) Millie Bright	(England) Chelsea
(England) Lucy Bronze	(England) Chelsea
(England) Leah Williamson	(England) Arsenal
Midfielders
(Spain) Aitana Bonmatí	(Spain) Barcelona
(Morocco) Ghizlane Chebbak	(Saudi Arabia) Al Hilal
(Spain) Alexia Putellas	(Spain) Barcelona
Forwards
(Zambia) Barbra Banda	(United States) Orlando Pride
(England) Chloe Kelly	(England) Manchester City / (England) Arsenal
(England) Alessia Russo	(England) Arsenal
