= 2019 Nations League =

2019 Nations League may refer to:

- 2019–20 CONCACAF Nations League, a North American association football tournament.
  - 2019–20 CONCACAF Nations League qualifying
- 2018–19 UEFA Nations League, a European association football tournament.
  - 2019 UEFA Nations League Finals, final rounds of the tournament.
  - 2019 UEFA Nations League Final, final match of the tournament.
