= UEFA Club Footballer of the Year =

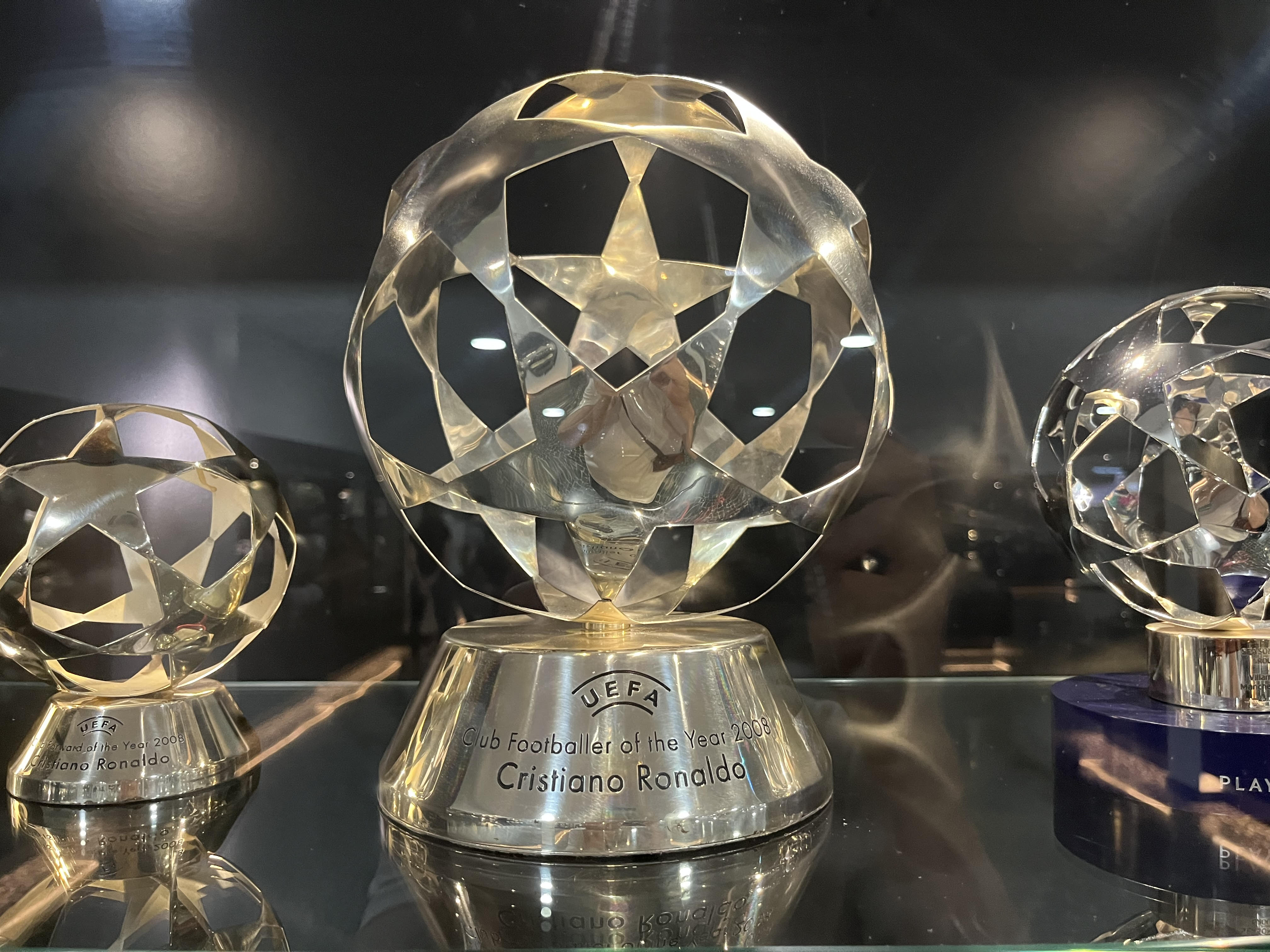
- Presented by: UEFA
- First award: 1998
- Final award: 2010

Highlights
- Most wins: 13 players (1 award each)
- Related: UEFA Men's Player of the Year Award

The UEFA Club Footballer of the Year was a football award presented by UEFA to the most outstanding performers of every European club football season. The award, along with "Best Goalkeeper", "Best Defender", "Best Midfielder," and "Best Forward", was given at the end of each season at a special gala in Monaco prior to the UEFA Super Cup. The honour had been bestowed upon first-class European football stars since the 1997–98 season, when it was awarded to Ronaldo, then of Internazionale. Since the 2010–11 season, it has been replaced by the UEFA Men's Player of the Year Award.

== Winners ==
Below is a list of all the recipients of the award:

Season	Country	Player	Playing position	Club	Also won
1997–98	BRA	Ronaldo	Forward	(Italy) Internazionale	Best Forward
1998–99	ENG	David Beckham	Midfielder	(England) Manchester United	Best Midfielder
1999–2000	ARG	Fernando Redondo	Midfielder	(Spain) Real Madrid	
2000–01	GER	Stefan Effenberg	Midfielder	(Germany) Bayern Munich	
2001–02	FRA	Zinedine Zidane	Midfielder	(Spain) Real Madrid	
2002–03	ITA	Gianluigi Buffon	Goalkeeper	(Italy) Juventus	Best Goalkeeper
2003–04	POR	Deco	Midfielder	(Portugal) Porto	Best Midfielder
2004–05	ENG	Steven Gerrard	Midfielder	(England) Liverpool	
2005–06	BRA	Ronaldinho	Forward	(Spain) Barcelona	
2006–07	BRA	Kaká	Midfielder	(Italy) Milan	Best Forward
2007–08	POR	Cristiano Ronaldo	Forward	(England) Manchester United	Best Forward
2008–09	ARG	Lionel Messi	Forward	(Spain) Barcelona	Best Forward
2009–10	ARG	Diego Milito	Forward	(Italy) Internazionale	Best Forward

=== By country ===
Country	Players
Brazil	3
Argentina	3
England	2
Portugal	2
Germany	1
France	1
Italy	1

=== By club ===
Club	Players
(Spain) Real Madrid	2
(England) Manchester United	2
(Spain) Barcelona	2
(Italy) Internazionale	2
(Germany) Bayern Munich	1
(Italy) Juventus	1
(Portugal) Porto	1
(England) Liverpool	1
(Italy) Milan	1

== See also ==
- UEFA Men's Player of the Year Award
- UEFA Club Football Awards
- UEFA Team of the Year
