= UEFA Men's Player of the Year Award =

Association football award

UEFA Men's Player of the Year
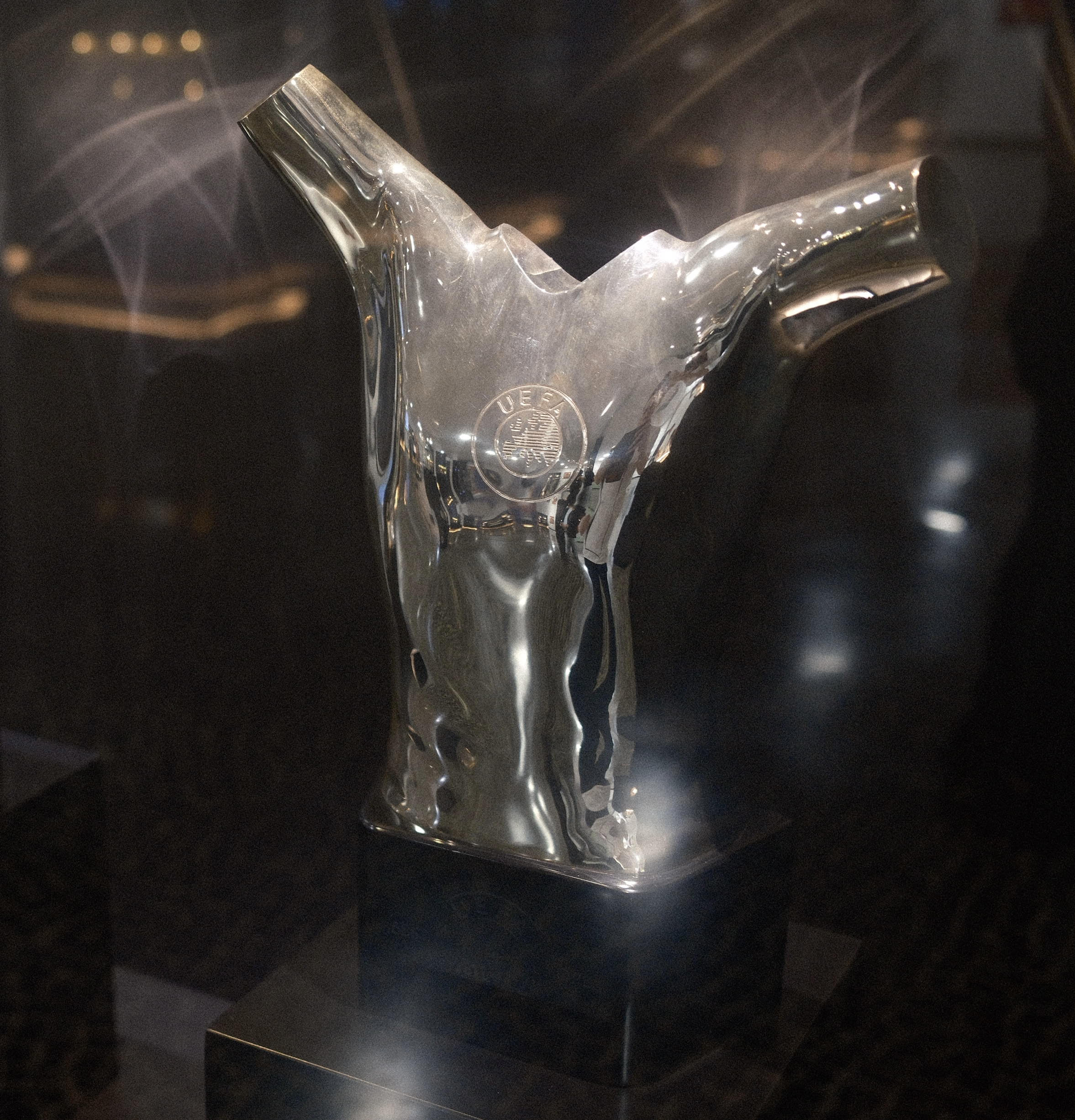
- UEFA Men's Player of the Year Award
- Sponsored by: ESM
- Presented by: UEFA
- Formerly called: UEFA Club Footballer of the Year (1998–2010); UEFA Best Player in Europe (2011–16)
- First award: 2011
- Final award: 2023

Highlights
- Most wins: (Portugal) Cristiano Ronaldo (3 awards)
- Website: UEFA.com

The UEFA Men's Player of the Year Award (previously known as the UEFA Best Player in Europe Award) is an association football award given to the footballer playing for a men's football club in Europe that is considered the best in the previous season of both club and national team competition. The award, created in 2011 by UEFA in partnership with European Sports Media (ESM) group, was initially aimed at reviving the European Footballer of the Year Award (Ballon d'Or), which was merged with the FIFA World Player of the Year Award in 2010 to become the FIFA Ballon d'Or. It also replaced the UEFA Club Footballer of the Year award.

Cristiano Ronaldo has won the award the most time with 3 awards and is the only player to win it twice in a row. Female players are awarded the UEFA Women's Player of the Year Award, introduced in 2013.

UEFA partnered with Groupe Amaury to co-organise the Ballon d'Or awards from 2024. The partnership means UEFA's awards for the best player and best coach will cease to exist. But UEFA will continue to present the President's Award as well as prizes for the best player in each of their competitions.

== Criteria ==
According to UEFA, the award "recognise[s] the best player playing for a football club within the territory of a UEFA member association during the previous season." Players are judged by their performances in all competitions, domestic and international, and at club and national team levels throughout the season.

== Voting ==
At the beginning, the award's voting format was a return to the old Ballon d'Or, which was decided purely by journalists.

In the first round of voting, 53 sports journalists representing each of the UEFA national associations provided a list of their three best-ranked players from one to three, with the first player receiving five points, the second three points and the third one point. The three players with the most points overall were shortlisted. The jury comprised renowned sports journalists representing each of UEFA's national associations, from RTV Albania to the Daily Post in Wales via members of European Sports Media, with whom UEFA collaborated on this award. The final vote, also by the journalists, then took place live via electronic voting during the presentation ceremony.

In 2017, however, UEFA added 80 coaches, from the clubs that participated in the group stages of that year's UEFA Champions League and UEFA Europa League, to its jury. The amount of journalists selected by European Sports Media was also increased to 55, representing each of UEFA's member associations.

In 2020/21 UEFA National Team Coaches were added to the jury

In 2022/23 the Coaches from the UEFA Conference League Group stages were added to the jury

== Award history ==
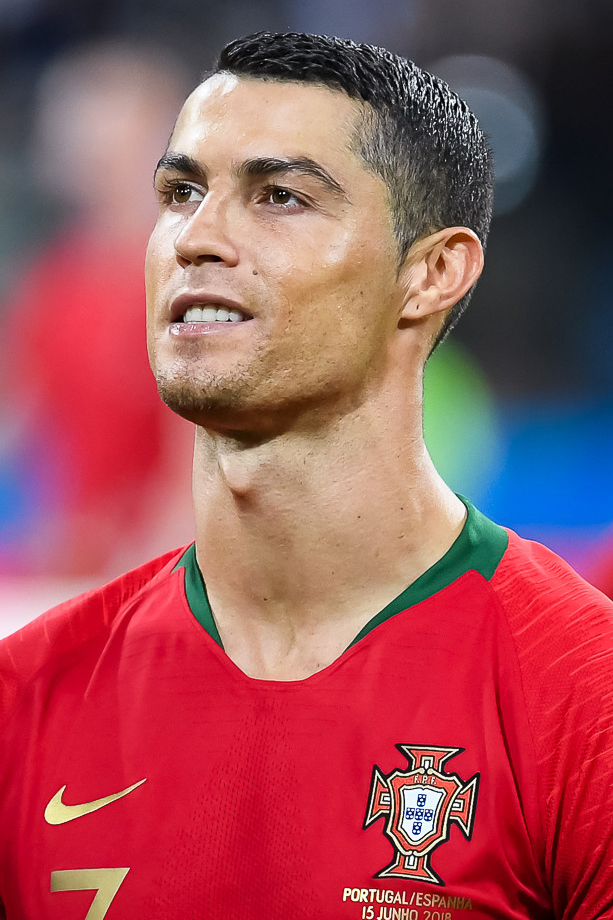
Cristiano Ronaldo has won the most UEFA Men's Player of the Year Award in history, with three.

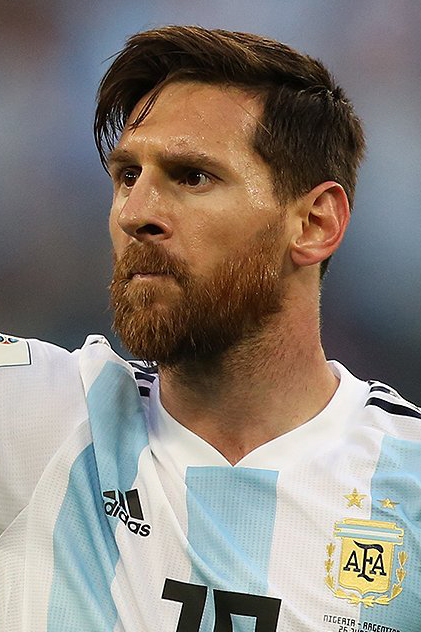
Lionel Messi is the only non-European player to win the award and one of the two players to win it more than once.

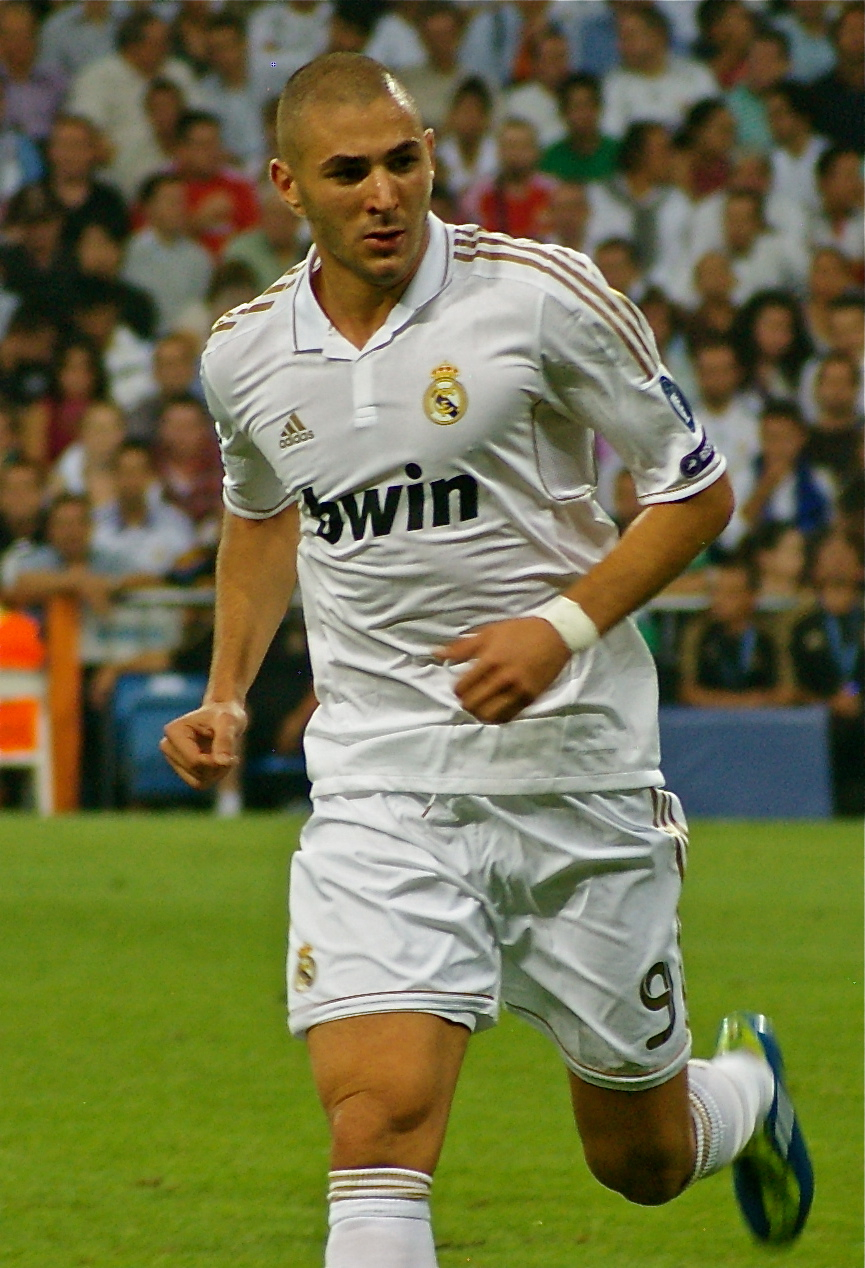
Karim Benzema won the award with a record number of points.

=== Winners ===
Season	Player	Club
UEFA Best Player in Europe Award
2010–11	(Argentina) Lionel Messi	(Spain) Barcelona
2011–12	(Spain) Andrés Iniesta	(Spain) Barcelona
2012–13	(France) Franck Ribéry	(Germany) Bayern Munich
2013–14	(Portugal) Cristiano Ronaldo	(Spain) Real Madrid
2014–15	(Argentina) Lionel Messi	(Spain) Barcelona
2015–16	(Portugal) Cristiano Ronaldo	(Spain) Real Madrid
UEFA Men's Player of the Year Award
2016–17	(Portugal) Cristiano Ronaldo	(Spain) Real Madrid
2017–18	(Croatia) Luka Modrić	(Spain) Real Madrid
2018–19	(Netherlands) Virgil van Dijk	(England) Liverpool
2019–20	(Poland) Robert Lewandowski	(Germany) Bayern Munich
2020–21	(Italy) Jorginho	(England) Chelsea
2021–22	(France) Karim Benzema	(Spain) Real Madrid
2022–23	(Norway) Erling Haaland	(England) Manchester City

=== Finalists ===
Winner Shortlisted

==== 2010–11 ====
Rank	Player	First round	Final round	Club
1	(Argentina) Lionel Messi	–	38	(Spain) Barcelona
2	(Spain) Xavi	–	11	(Spain) Barcelona
3	(Portugal) Cristiano Ronaldo	–	3	(Spain) Real Madrid
4	(Spain) Andrés Iniesta	33	–	(Spain) Barcelona
5	(Colombia) Radamel Falcao	17	–	(Portugal) Porto
6	(England) Wayne Rooney	15	–	(England) Manchester United
7	(Serbia) Nemanja Vidić	5	–	(England) Manchester United
8	(Sweden) Zlatan Ibrahimović	4	–	(Italy) Milan
8	(Spain) Gerard Piqué	4	–	(Spain) Barcelona
10	(Germany) Manuel Neuer	3	–	(Germany) Schalke 04

==== 2011–12 ====
Rank	Player	First round	Final round	Club
1	(Spain) Andrés Iniesta	–	19	(Spain) Barcelona
2	(Argentina) Lionel Messi	–	17	(Spain) Barcelona
2	(Portugal) Cristiano Ronaldo	–	17	(Spain) Real Madrid
4	(Italy) Andrea Pirlo	90	–	(Italy) Juventus
5	(Spain) Xavi	57	–	(Spain) Barcelona
6	(Spain) Iker Casillas	53	–	(Spain) Real Madrid
7	(Ivory Coast) Didier Drogba	31	–	(England) Chelsea
8	(Czech Republic) Petr Čech	14	–	(England) Chelsea
8	(Colombia) Radamel Falcao	14	–	(Spain) Atlético Madrid
10	(Germany) Mesut Özil	10	–	(Spain) Real Madrid

==== 2012–13 ====
Rank	Player	First round	Final round	Club
1	(France) Franck Ribéry	–	36	(Germany) Bayern Munich
2	(Argentina) Lionel Messi	–	14	(Spain) Barcelona
3	(Portugal) Cristiano Ronaldo	–	3	(Spain) Real Madrid
4	(Netherlands) Arjen Robben	57	–	(Germany) Bayern Munich
5	(Poland) Robert Lewandowski	39	–	(Germany) Borussia Dortmund
6	(Germany) Thomas Müller	38	–	(Germany) Bayern Munich
7	(Germany) Bastian Schweinsteiger	32	–	(Germany) Bayern Munich
8	(Wales) Gareth Bale	24	–	(England) Tottenham Hotspur
9	(Sweden) Zlatan Ibrahimović	14	–	(France) Paris Saint-Germain
10	(Netherlands) Robin van Persie	10	–	(England) Manchester United

==== 2013–14 ====
Rank	Player	First round	Final round	Club
1	(Portugal) Cristiano Ronaldo	–	26	(Spain) Real Madrid
2	(Germany) Manuel Neuer	–	19	(Germany) Bayern Munich
3	(Netherlands) Arjen Robben	–	9	(Germany) Bayern Munich
4	(Germany) Thomas Müller	39	–	(Germany) Bayern Munich
5	(Germany) Philipp Lahm	24	–	(Germany) Bayern Munich
5	(Argentina) Lionel Messi	24	–	(Spain) Barcelona
7	(Colombia) James Rodríguez	16	–	(France) Monaco
8	(Uruguay) Luis Suárez	13	–	(England) Liverpool
9	(Argentina) Ángel Di María	12	–	(Spain) Real Madrid
10	(Spain) Diego Costa	8	–	(Spain) Atlético Madrid

==== 2014–15 ====
Rank	Player	First round	Final round	Club
1	(Argentina) Lionel Messi	–	49	(Spain) Barcelona
2	(Uruguay) Luis Suárez	–	3	(Spain) Barcelona
3	(Portugal) Cristiano Ronaldo	–	2	(Spain) Real Madrid
4	(Italy) Gianluigi Buffon	24	–	(Italy) Juventus
5	(Brazil) Neymar	23	–	(Spain) Barcelona
6	(Belgium) Eden Hazard	21	–	(England) Chelsea
7	(Italy) Andrea Pirlo	12	–	(Italy) Juventus
8	(Chile) Arturo Vidal	11	–	(Italy) Juventus
9	(Argentina) Carlos Tevez	8	–	(Italy) Juventus
10	(France) Paul Pogba	5	–	(Italy) Juventus

==== 2015–16 ====
Rank	Player	First round	Final round	Club
1	(Portugal) Cristiano Ronaldo	–	40	(Spain) Real Madrid
2	(France) Antoine Griezmann	–	8	(Spain) Atlético Madrid
3	(Wales) Gareth Bale	–	7	(Spain) Real Madrid
4	(Uruguay) Luis Suárez	29	–	(Spain) Barcelona
5	(Argentina) Lionel Messi	25	–	(Spain) Barcelona
6	(Italy) Gianluigi Buffon	19	–	(Italy) Juventus
7	(Portugal) Pepe	9	–	(Spain) Real Madrid
8	(Germany) Manuel Neuer	6	–	(Germany) Bayern Munich
9	(Germany) Toni Kroos	5	–	(Spain) Real Madrid
10	(Germany) Thomas Müller	2	–	(Germany) Bayern Munich

==== 2016–17 ====
Rank	Player	First round	Final round	Club
1	(Portugal) Cristiano Ronaldo	–	482	(Spain) Real Madrid
2	(Argentina) Lionel Messi	–	141	(Spain) Barcelona
3	(Italy) Gianluigi Buffon	–	109	(Italy) Juventus
4	(Croatia) Luka Modrić		–	(Spain) Real Madrid
5	(Germany) Toni Kroos		–	(Spain) Real Madrid
6	(Argentina) Paulo Dybala		–	(Italy) Juventus
7	(Spain) Sergio Ramos		–	(Spain) Real Madrid
8	(France) Kylian Mbappé		–	(France) Monaco
9	(Poland) Robert Lewandowski		–	(Germany) Bayern Munich
10	(Sweden) Zlatan Ibrahimović		–	(England) Manchester United

==== 2017–18 ====
Rank	Player	Points	Club
1	(Croatia) Luka Modrić	313	(Spain) Real Madrid
2	(Portugal) Cristiano Ronaldo	223	(Spain) Real Madrid
3	(Egypt) Mohamed Salah	134	(England) Liverpool
4	(France) Antoine Griezmann	72	(Spain) Atlético Madrid
5	(Argentina) Lionel Messi	55	(Spain) Barcelona
6	(France) Kylian Mbappé	43	(France) Paris Saint-Germain
7	(Belgium) Kevin De Bruyne	28	(England) Manchester City
8	(France) Raphaël Varane	23	(Spain) Real Madrid
9	(Belgium) Eden Hazard	15	(England) Chelsea
10	(Spain) Sergio Ramos	12	(Spain) Real Madrid

==== 2018–19 ====
Rank	Player	Points	Club
1	(Netherlands) Virgil van Dijk	305	(England) Liverpool
2	(Argentina) Lionel Messi	207	(Spain) Barcelona
3	(Portugal) Cristiano Ronaldo	74	(Italy) Juventus
4	(Brazil) Alisson	57	(England) Liverpool
5	(Senegal) Sadio Mané	51	(England) Liverpool
6	(Egypt) Mohamed Salah	49	(England) Liverpool
7	(Belgium) Eden Hazard	38	(England) Chelsea
8	(Netherlands) Frenkie de Jong	27	(Netherlands) Ajax
8	(Netherlands) Matthijs de Ligt	27	(Netherlands) Ajax
10	(England) Raheem Sterling	12	(England) Manchester City

==== 2019–20 ====
Rank	Player	Points	Club
1	(Poland) Robert Lewandowski	477	(Germany) Bayern Munich
2	(Belgium) Kevin De Bruyne	90	(England) Manchester City
3	(Germany) Manuel Neuer	66	(Germany) Bayern Munich
4	(Argentina) Lionel Messi	53	(Spain) Barcelona
4	(Brazil) Neymar	53	(France) Paris Saint-Germain
6	(Germany) Thomas Müller	41	(Germany) Bayern Munich
7	(France) Kylian Mbappé	39	(France) Paris Saint-Germain
8	(Spain) Thiago	27	(Germany) Bayern Munich
9	(Germany) Joshua Kimmich	26	(Germany) Bayern Munich
10	(Portugal) Cristiano Ronaldo	25	(Italy) Juventus

==== 2020–21 ====
Rank	Player	Points	Club
1	(Italy) Jorginho	175	(England) Chelsea
2	(Belgium) Kevin De Bruyne	167	(England) Manchester City
3	(France) N'Golo Kanté	160	(England) Chelsea
4	(Argentina) Lionel Messi	148	(Spain) Barcelona
5	(Poland) Robert Lewandowski	140	(Germany) Bayern Munich
6	(Italy) Gianluigi Donnarumma	49	(Italy) Milan
7	(France) Kylian Mbappé	31	(France) Paris Saint-Germain
8	(England) Raheem Sterling	18	(England) Manchester City
9	(Portugal) Cristiano Ronaldo	16	(Italy) Juventus
10	(Norway) Erling Haaland	15	(Germany) Borussia Dortmund

==== 2021–22 ====
Rank	Player	Points	Club
1	(France) Karim Benzema	523	(Spain) Real Madrid
2	(Belgium) Kevin De Bruyne	122	(England) Manchester City
3	(Belgium) Thibaut Courtois	118	(Spain) Real Madrid
4	(Poland) Robert Lewandowski	54	(Germany) Bayern Munich
5	(Croatia) Luka Modrić	52	(Spain) Real Madrid
6	(Senegal) Sadio Mané	51	(England) Liverpool
7	(Egypt) Mohamed Salah	46	(England) Liverpool
8	(France) Kylian Mbappé	25	(France) Paris Saint-Germain
9	(Brazil) Vinícius Júnior	21	(Spain) Real Madrid
10	(Netherlands) Virgil van Dijk	19	(England) Liverpool
11	(Portugal) Bernardo Silva	7	(England) Manchester City
12	(Serbia) Filip Kostić	7	(Germany) Eintracht Frankfurt
13	(Italy) Lorenzo Pellegrini	5	(Italy) Roma
14	(England) Trent Alexander-Arnold	2	(England) Liverpool
15	(Brazil) Fabinho	1	(England) Liverpool

==== 2022–23 ====
Rank	Player	Points	Club
1	(Norway) Erling Haaland	352	(England) Manchester City
2	(Argentina) Lionel Messi	227	(France) Paris Saint-Germain
3	(Belgium) Kevin De Bruyne	225	(England) Manchester City
4	(Germany) İlkay Gündoğan	129	(England) Manchester City
5	(Spain) Rodri	110	(England) Manchester City
6	(France) Kylian Mbappé	82	(France) Paris Saint-Germain
7	(Croatia) Luka Modrić	33	(Spain) Real Madrid
8	(Croatia) Marcelo Brozović	20	(Italy) Inter Milan
9	(England) Declan Rice	14	(England) West Ham United
10	(Argentina) Alexis Mac Allister	12	(England) Brighton & Hove Albion
11	(Spain) Jesús Navas	6	(Spain) Sevilla

=== By player ===
Player	Winner	Second place	Third place
(Portugal) Cristiano Ronaldo	3	1	5
(Argentina) Lionel Messi	2	5	—
(Spain) Andrés Iniesta	1	—	—
(France) Franck Ribéry	1	—	—
(Croatia) Luka Modrić	1	—	—
(Netherlands) Virgil van Dijk	1	—	—
(Poland) Robert Lewandowski	1	—	—
(Italy) Jorginho	1	—	—
(France) Karim Benzema	1	—	—
(Norway) Erling Haaland	1	—	—
(Belgium) Kevin De Bruyne	—	3	1
(Germany) Manuel Neuer	—	1	1
(Spain) Xavi	—	1	—
(Uruguay) Luis Suárez	—	1	—
(France) Antoine Griezmann	—	1	—
(Netherlands) Arjen Robben	—	–	1
(Wales) Gareth Bale	—	–	1
(Italy) Gianluigi Buffon	—	—	1
(Egypt) Mohamed Salah	—	—	1
(France) N'Golo Kante	—	—	1
(Belgium) Thibaut Courtois	—	—	1

== See also ==
- UEFA Club Footballer of the Year
- UEFA Club Football Awards
- UEFA Team of the Year
