= Estádio do Dragão =

Football stadium in Porto, Portugal

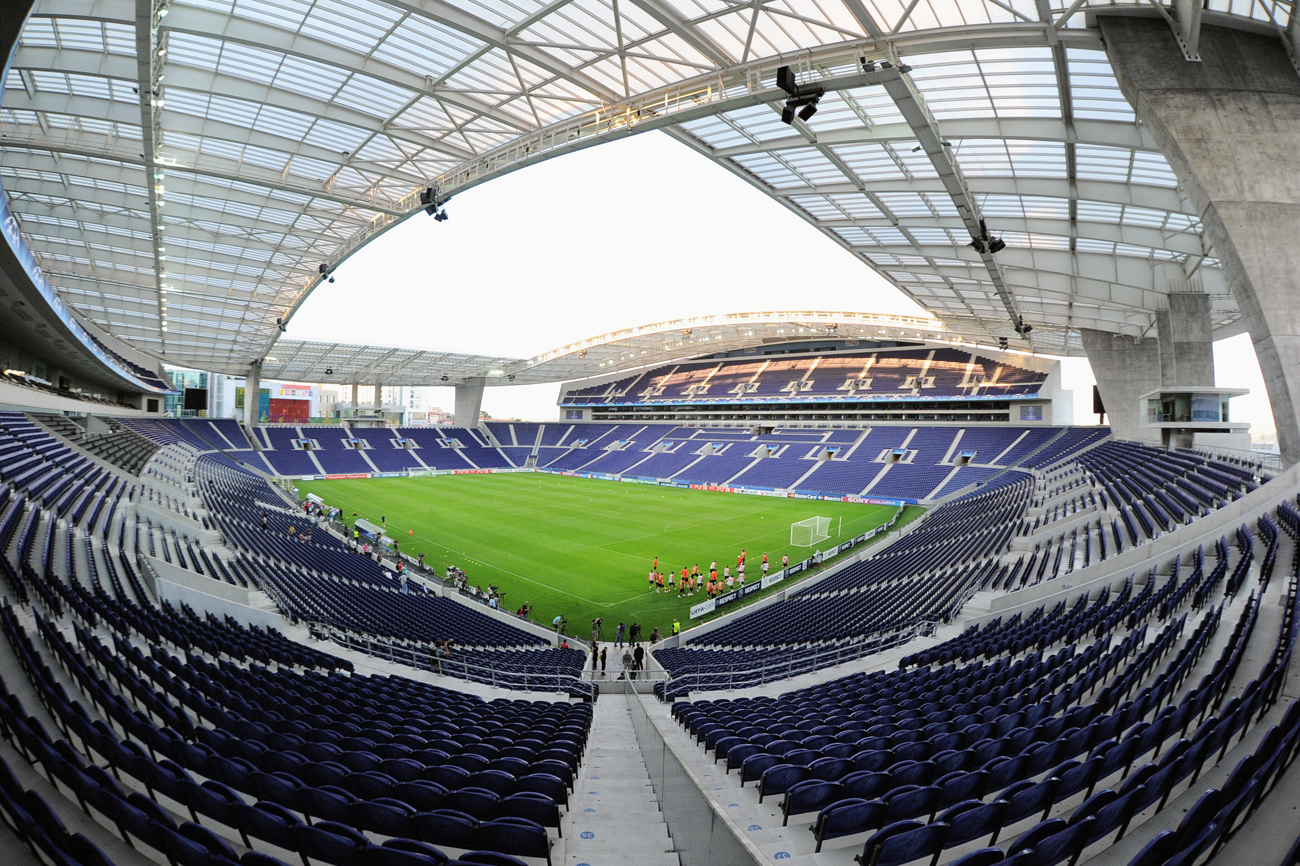
- UEFA
- Interactive map of Estádio do Dragão
- Location: Porto, Portugal
- Coordinates: 41.1618°N 8.5839°W
- Owner: FC Porto
- Operator: Porto Estádio (FC Porto Group)
- Capacity: 50,033
- Executive suites: 96
- Surface: Grass
- Scoreboard: Samsung P10 LED screens
- Record attendance: 52,004 (16 November 2003); FC Porto 2–0 FC Barcelona
- Field size: 105 x 68 m
- Public transit: Estádio do Dragão

Construction
- Opened: 16 November 2003; 22 years ago
- Cost: €125 million
- Architect: Manuel Salgado
- General contractor: Somague

Tenants
- FC Porto (2003–present); Portugal national football team (selected matches)

Website
- fcporto.pt

The Estádio do Dragão (Portuguese pronunciation: [ɨˈʃtaðju ðu ðɾɐˈɣɐ̃w]; English: Dragon Stadium) is an all-seater football stadium in Porto, Portugal, and the home ground of FC Porto since 2003. It has a seating capacity of 50,033, making it the third-largest football stadium in Portugal.

Designed by Portuguese architect Manuel Salgado, the stadium was constructed to replace Porto's former ground, the Estádio das Antas, along with becoming one of the host venues for the UEFA Euro 2004 final tournament. The inauguration took place on 16 November 2003 with a friendly match against Barcelona, setting an attendance record of 52,004 spectators.

A UEFA category four stadium, it has held several international club and national team competition matches, including the 2019 UEFA Nations League Final and 2021 UEFA Champions League Final.

The stadium is one of the potential venues for the 2030 FIFA World Cup which Portugal will co-host along with Morocco and Spain.

== Construction and inauguration ==
Construction works began in late 2001, and were completed in November 2003, some months after what was expected, since in February 2002, Porto mayor Rui Rio changed the estate distribution, criticizing the plan for including high-scale housing and shopping for the area. These actions forced the chairman of FC Porto, Jorge Nuno Pinto da Costa, to halt all building operations, which were only resumed after a consensus was reached.

Designed by Portuguese architect Manuel Salgado and built by Portuguese contractor Somague, it cost €125 million to build, of which €18,076,409 was supported from the Portuguese state. To help underwrite costs, each stand carried one or two sponsor names: Super Bock (south), tmn (east), meo (west), and Coca-Cola (north stand). Away fans are placed in the right corner of the upper tier of the east stand, while home Ultra groups, Super Dragões and Colectivo Ultras 95, occupy the south stand and the north stand, respectively, like on the old stadium.

The stadium was inaugurated on November 16, 2003, with a match against Barcelona, which featured the debut of a 16-year-old Lionel Messi on the invited side. Porto won 2–0 with goals from Derlei and Hugo Almeida. Due to severe turf problems, however, Porto was forced to return and play in the old Estádio das Antas, until the turf was replanted by mid-February 2004.

The stadium is characterized by a frame of 21,000 m^{2} of azulejos.

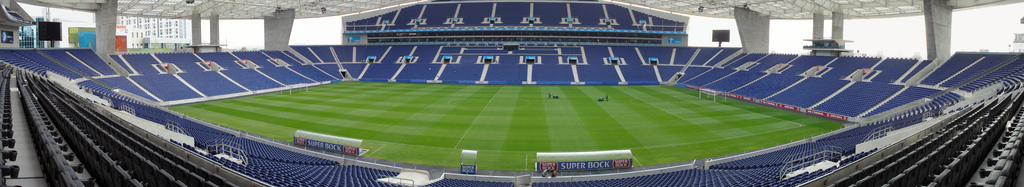
A panorama of the Estádio do Dragão on 13 March 2010

== Naming ==
Prior to the inauguration, the stadium's name was debated internally between elements of Porto's administration, with various alternatives in consideration, such as retaining the old name, Estádio das Antas (officially, unlike the former stadium), or name it after some of the club's biggest historical figures like former player Artur de Sousa Pinga, manager José Maria Pedroto or president Jorge Nuno Pinto da Costa, the latter being, the one with most gathered consensus but ended dismissed by the president himself. After a deliberation period, the name Estádio do Dragão was revealed to the general public.

The Dragon is in our symbol and the coat of arms of the city, there was no better to symbolize the strength and vitality of FC Porto, neither the certainty of our future. There is no name that mythologically or ideologically conveys the will of new conquests like that of the Dragon.

— Pinto da Costa, on the stadium name (May 2003)

== International matches ==
=== Portugal national team matches ===
The following national team matches were held in the stadium.

#	Date	Score	Opponent	Competition
1.	12 June 2004	1–2	Greece	Euro 2004 Group Stage
2.	12 October 2005	3–0	Latvia	2006 World Cup Qualification
3.	21 November 2007	0–0	Finland	Euro 2008 Qualifying
4.	28 March 2009	0–0	Sweden	2010 World Cup Qualification
5.	8 October 2010	3–1	Denmark	Euro 2012 Qualifying
6.	7 October 2011	5–3	Iceland	Euro 2012 Qualifying
7.	16 October 2012	1–1	Northern Ireland	2014 World Cup Qualification
8.	29 May 2016	3–0	Norway	Friendly
9.	5 June 2019	3–1	Switzerland	2019 UEFA Nations League Semi-finals
10.	9 June 2019	1–0	Netherlands	2019 UEFA Nations League Final
11.	5 September 2020	4–1	Croatia	2020–21 UEFA Nations League
12.	24 March 2022	3–1	Turkey	2022 World Cup Qualification
13.	29 March 2022	2–0	North Macedonia	2022 World Cup Qualification
14.	13 October 2023	3–2	Slovakia	Euro 2024 qualifying
15.	15 November 2024	5–1	Poland	2024–25 UEFA Nations League
16.	16 November 2025	9–1	Armenia	2026 World Cup Qualification
17.	4 October 2026	2–1	Norway	2026–27 UEFA Nations League

=== UEFA Euro 2004 ===
Constructed to become one of the venues of the UEFA Euro 2004 tournament, it staged the inaugural match between hosts Portugal and eventual winners Greece, as well as three group stage, one quarterfinal, and one semifinal fixtures.

Date	Team #1	Result	Team #2	Round	Attendance
12 June 2004	Portugal	1–2	Greece	Group A (opening match)	48,761
15 June 2004	Germany	1–1	Netherlands	Group D	48,197
18 June 2004	Italy	1–1	Sweden	Group C	44,926
27 June 2004	Czech Republic	3–0	Denmark	Quarter-finals	41,092
1 July 2004	Greece	1–0 (aet)	Czech Republic	Semi-finals	42,449

=== 2019 UEFA Nations League Finals ===
One of the venues of the 2019 UEFA Nations League Finals.

Date	Team #1	Result	Team #2	Round	Attendance
5 June 2019	Portugal	3–1	Switzerland	Semi-finals	42,415
9 June 2019	Portugal	1–0	Netherlands	Final	43,199

=== 2021 UEFA Champions League Final ===
The final originally planned at the Atatürk Olympic Stadium in Istanbul, but was moved due to travel restrictions by England government caused by the COVID-19 pandemic in Turkey, the final hosts were shifted back a two-year, with Istanbul instead hosting the 2023 final. Chelsea FC won the match 1–0 against Manchester City, with Kai Havertz scoring the only goal.

UEFA Champions League finals
Season	Winners	Score	Runners-up	Attendance
2020–21	Chelsea (England)	1–0	(England) Manchester City	14,110

== Other uses ==
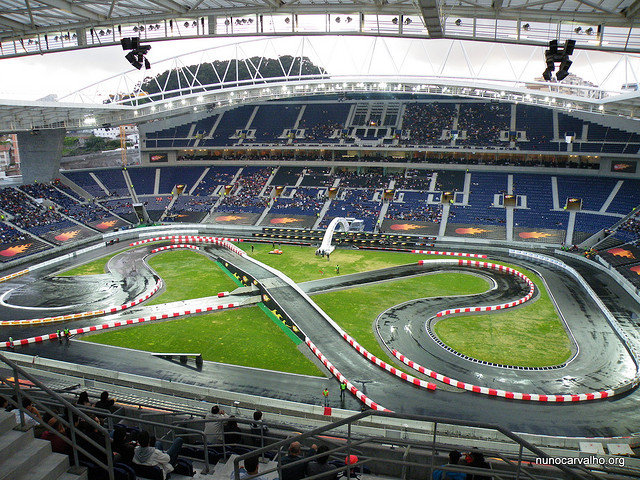
Stadium pitch converted into a racing track for the ROC South Europe Regional Final

A major source of income granted by the infrastructure is the planned capability to monetize on organizing events outside of regular football matches. Those extend from business meetings, congresses, summits, festivals, expos and other sports competitions. For example, the ROC committee picked the stadium to host the 2009 Race of Champions South Europe Regional Final, therefore, the grass pitch was converted into an asphalt course in order to accommodate the race. The 2019 ESSMA Summit is also noteworthy by having joined several clubs, leagues and federations representatives together at the venue to discuss matters on the developments and trends of the football industry.

In addition, through different music promoters and specialized event management companies, the stadium already served as a concert venue to four international tour schedules from recognized musical artists along with selected opening acts.

Date	Performer(s)	Tour / Event	Attendance	Ref.
12 August 2006	The Rolling Stones; The Dandy Warhols	A Bigger Bang Tour	47,801	
18 May 2012	Coldplay; Marina and the Diamonds / Rita Ora	Mylo Xyloto Tour	52,457	
10 June 2013	Muse; We Are the Ocean	The 2nd Law World Tour	45,000	
13 July 2014	One Direction; D.A.M.A	Where We Are Tour	45,001	

== Access and transportation ==
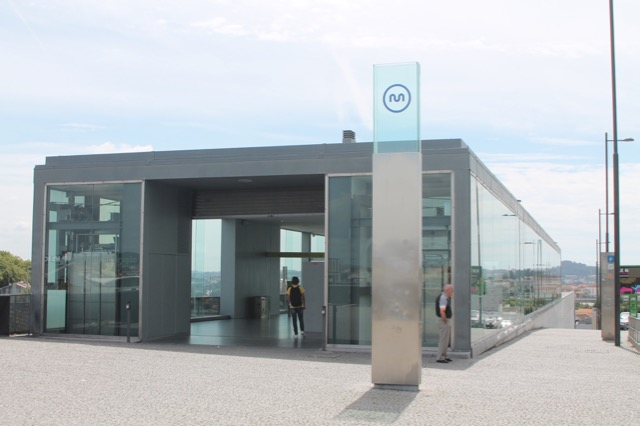
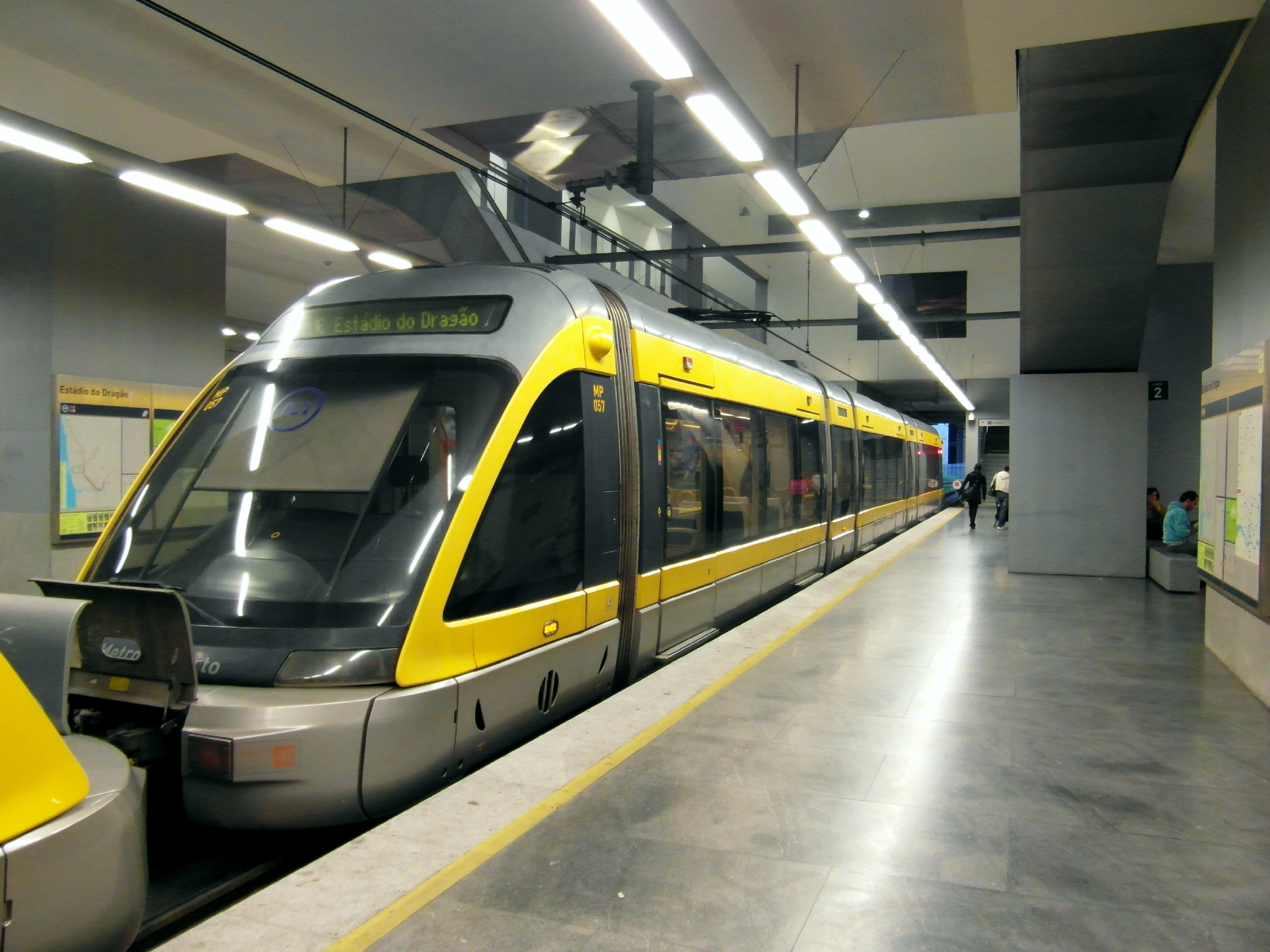
Entrance to the stadium underground metro station (top). Metro in the station line (bottom).

Access by vehicle is possible through the VCI (Via de Cintura Interna), a roadway that passes right next to the stadium, granting a direct connection. In the event of coming from the city center, driving down the main Alameda da Antas is another viable route towards the destination. In spite of this, the recommendation is the use of the public transports, which results in a better flux of public movement around the perimeter. Having its own station combined with the infrastructure, the metro functions as the main way of reaching the stadium, with different lines linking the various city areas and a direct connection to the international Francisco Sá Carneiro Airport. Alternatively, the STCP bus service also grants routes for the purpose and there are 150 bicycle parking spots available.

Transport	Lines	Stations / Routes
Metro	Porto Metro	Estádio do Dragão ⇄ Senhor de Matosinhos
Metro	Porto Metro	Estádio do Dragão ⇄ Póvoa de Varzim
Metro	Porto Metro	Estádio do Dragão ⇄ Airport
Metro	Porto Metro	Fânzeres ⇄ Senhora da Hora
Bus	401	Bolhão (Mercado) ⇄ S. Roque
Bus	806	Marquês ⇄ Av. Carvalha (Via Portelinha)

== See also ==
- Lists of stadiums

== Bibliography ==
- Bandeira, João Pedro (2012). Bíblia do FC Porto (in Portuguese). Lisbon: Prime Books. ISBN 9789896550943.

Preceded by None	UEFA Nations League; Final venue 2019	Succeeded by San Siro; Milan
Preceded by Estádio da Luz; Lisbon	UEFA Champions League; Final venue 2021	Succeeded by Stade de France; Saint-Denis
