= UEFA Team of the Year =

UEFA Fan's Team of the Year
- Presented by: UEFA
- First award: 2001

Highlights
- Most wins: (Portugal) Cristiano Ronaldo (15 appearances)
- Website: www.uefa.com

The UEFA Fan's Team of the Year is a football award given by UEFA through a poll on its official website. This award started in 2001 and allows users of the organization's website to choose their own eleven players and a coach based on their overall performances in European club football and international competitions.

== Selection process ==
Until 2011, the writers at the website had constructed a short-list of sixty footballers and coaches who have performed well in European club competitions, domestic competitions and international tournaments for that particular year. Users then cast their vote of a line-up consisting of eleven players (including a goalkeeper, four defenders, four midfielders, and two forwards) and a coach based on who they believed excelled in European football. After the selection is made, the user also has to select one of the players to be the captain of their team.

The format of the vote was changed in 2012 – now users first choose their preferred formation (4–4–2, 3–5–2, 3–4–3, 4–3–3 or 5–3–2), and then choose the relevant number of players for each position. The voters have a choice between 4 goalkeepers, 12 defenders, 12 midfielders and 12 forwards. The voting for best coach was discontinued.

After the votes are cast, they are tallied and the final team is announced on the UEFA website.

== Appearance records ==
The player with the most appearances in the team is Cristiano Ronaldo, having appeared fifteen times. Second is Lionel Messi, having appeared twelve times. Sergio Ramos has the third-most appearances with nine, which is also the record for a defender. The most consecutive appearances in the team is fourteen for Cristiano Ronaldo (2007–2020), followed by Sergio Ramos (2012–2018) and Lionel Messi (2014–2020) with seven each, and Iker Casillas (2007–2012) with six.

The teams with the most player appearances (not including manager appearances) are Real Madrid and Barcelona with 49 each, followed by Bayern Munich (21) and Juventus (20). Barcelona is the team with the most players selected in a single season, with six players in both 2009 and 2010. The only other teams with more than three players in one season are Bayern Munich (four in 2013 and five in both 2014 and 2020), Liverpool (five in 2019), and Real Madrid (five in both 2017 and 2018 and four in 2003, 2012, 2013, 2014 and 2016).

The manager with the most appearances is José Mourinho, with four appearances (one with Internazionale, two with Porto and one with Chelsea). He is followed by Alex Ferguson, who has two appearances.

== Team of the Year 2001 ==
Player	Team(s)	Appearance
(Spain) Santiago Cañizares	(Spain) Valencia	1st
(Romania) Cosmin Contra	(Spain) Alavés (Italy) Milan	1st
(Finland) Sami Hyypiä	(England) Liverpool	1st
(Sweden) Patrik Andersson	(Germany) Bayern Munich (Spain) Barcelona	1st
(France) Bixente Lizarazu	(Germany) Bayern Munich	1st
(England) David Beckham	(England) Manchester United	1st
(France) Patrick Vieira	(England) Arsenal	1st
(France) Zinedine Zidane	(Italy) Juventus (Spain) Real Madrid	1st
(Argentina) Kily González	(Spain) Valencia	1st
(France) Thierry Henry	(England) Arsenal	1st
(France) David Trezeguet	(Italy) Juventus	1st

Coach: (France) Gérard Houllier ( (England) Liverpool)

Players who played for two teams during the voting year have the club they transferred to during a transfer window listed second.

== Team of the Year 2002 ==
Player	Team(s)	Appearance
(Turkey) Rüştü Reçber	(Turkey) Fenerbahçe	1st
(Spain) Carles Puyol	(Spain) Barcelona	1st
(Italy) Alessandro Nesta	(Italy) Lazio (Italy) Milan	1st
(Romania) Cristian Chivu	(Netherlands) Ajax	1st
(Brazil) Roberto Carlos	(Spain) Real Madrid	1st
(Netherlands) Clarence Seedorf	(Italy) Internazionale (Italy) Milan	1st
(Germany) Michael Ballack	(Germany) Bayer Leverkusen (Germany) Bayern Munich	1st
(France) Zinedine Zidane	(Spain) Real Madrid	2nd
(Republic of Ireland) Damien Duff	(England) Blackburn Rovers	1st
(France) Thierry Henry	(England) Arsenal	2nd
(Brazil) Ronaldo	(Italy) Internazionale (Spain) Real Madrid	1st

Coach: Şenol Güneş (Turkey)

Players who played for two teams during the voting year have the club they transferred to during a transfer window listed second.

== Team of the Year 2003 ==
Player	Team(s)	Appearance
(Italy) Gianluigi Buffon	(Italy) Juventus	1st
(Portugal) Paulo Ferreira	(Portugal) Porto	1st
(Italy) Alessandro Nesta	(Italy) Milan	2nd
(Italy) Paolo Maldini	(Italy) Milan	1st
(Brazil) Roberto Carlos	(Spain) Real Madrid	2nd
(Portugal) Luís Figo	(Spain) Real Madrid	1st
(England) David Beckham	(England) Manchester United (Spain) Real Madrid	2nd
(France) Zinedine Zidane	(Spain) Real Madrid	3rd
(Czech Republic) Pavel Nedvěd	(Italy) Juventus	1st
(France) Thierry Henry	(England) Arsenal	3rd
(Netherlands) Ruud van Nistelrooy	(England) Manchester United	1st

Coach: (Portugal) José Mourinho ( (Portugal) Porto)

Players who played for two teams during the voting year have the club they transferred to during a transfer window listed second.

== Team of the Year 2004 ==
Player	Team(s)	Appearance
(Italy) Gianluigi Buffon	(Italy) Juventus	2nd
(Brazil) Cafu	(Italy) Milan	1st
(Portugal) Ricardo Carvalho	(Portugal) Porto (England) Chelsea	1st
(Italy) Alessandro Nesta	(Italy) Milan	3rd
(England) Ashley Cole	(England) Arsenal	1st
(Portugal) Cristiano Ronaldo	(England) Manchester United	1st
(Portugal) Maniche	(Portugal) Porto	1st
(Brazil) Ronaldinho	(Spain) Barcelona	1st
(Czech Republic) Pavel Nedvěd	(Italy) Juventus	2nd
(France) Thierry Henry	(England) Arsenal	4th
(Ukraine) Andriy Shevchenko	(Italy) Milan	1st

Coach: (Portugal) José Mourinho ( (Portugal) Porto / (England) Chelsea)

Players who played for two teams during the voting year have the club they transferred to during a transfer window listed second.

== Team of the Year 2005 ==
Player	Team(s)	Appearance
(Czech Republic) Petr Čech	(England) Chelsea	1st
(Brazil) Cafu	(Italy) Milan	2nd
(England) John Terry	(England) Chelsea	1st
(Spain) Carles Puyol	(Spain) Barcelona	2nd
(Italy) Paolo Maldini	(Italy) Milan	2nd
(Spain) Luis García	(England) Liverpool	1st
(England) Steven Gerrard	(England) Liverpool	1st
(Brazil) Ronaldinho	(Spain) Barcelona	2nd
(Czech Republic) Pavel Nedvěd	(Italy) Juventus	3rd
(Cameroon) Samuel Eto'o	(Spain) Barcelona	1st
(Ukraine) Andriy Shevchenko	(Italy) Milan	2nd

Coach: (Portugal) José Mourinho ( (England) Chelsea)

== Team of the Year 2006 ==
Player	Team(s)	Appearance
(Italy) Gianluigi Buffon	(Italy) Juventus	3rd
(Italy) Gianluca Zambrotta	(Italy) Juventus (Spain) Barcelona	1st
(Italy) Fabio Cannavaro	(Italy) Juventus (Spain) Real Madrid	1st
(Spain) Carles Puyol	(Spain) Barcelona	3rd
(Germany) Philipp Lahm	(Germany) Bayern Munich	1st
(England) Steven Gerrard	(England) Liverpool	2nd
(Spain) Cesc Fàbregas	(England) Arsenal	1st
(Brazil) Kaká	(Italy) Milan	1st
(Brazil) Ronaldinho	(Spain) Barcelona	3rd
(France) Thierry Henry	(England) Arsenal	5th
(Cameroon) Samuel Eto'o	(Spain) Barcelona	2nd

Coach: (Netherlands) Frank Rijkaard ( (Spain) Barcelona)

Players who played for two teams during the voting year have the club they transferred to during a transfer window listed second.

== Team of the Year 2007 ==
Player	Team(s)	Appearance
(Spain) Iker Casillas	(Spain) Real Madrid	1st
(Brazil) Dani Alves	(Spain) Sevilla	1st
(Italy) Alessandro Nesta	(Italy) Milan	4th
(England) John Terry	(England) Chelsea	2nd
(France) Eric Abidal	(France) Lyon (Spain) Barcelona	1st
(Portugal) Cristiano Ronaldo	(England) Manchester United	2nd
(England) Steven Gerrard	(England) Liverpool	3rd
(Brazil) Kaká	(Italy) Milan	2nd
(Netherlands) Clarence Seedorf	(Italy) Milan	2nd
(Sweden) Zlatan Ibrahimović	(Italy) Internazionale	1st
(Ivory Coast) Didier Drogba	(England) Chelsea	1st

Coach: (Scotland) Alex Ferguson ( (England) Manchester United)

Players who played for two teams during the voting year have the club they transferred to during a transfer window listed second.

== Team of the Year 2008 ==
Player	Team(s)	Appearance
(Spain) Iker Casillas	(Spain) Real Madrid	2nd
(Spain) Sergio Ramos	(Spain) Real Madrid	1st
(England) John Terry	(England) Chelsea	3rd
(Spain) Carles Puyol	(Spain) Barcelona	4th
(Germany) Philipp Lahm	(Germany) Bayern Munich	2nd
(Portugal) Cristiano Ronaldo	(England) Manchester United	3rd
(Spain) Xavi	(Spain) Barcelona	1st
(Spain) Cesc Fàbregas	(England) Arsenal	2nd
(France) Franck Ribéry	(Germany) Bayern Munich	1st
(Argentina) Lionel Messi	(Spain) Barcelona	1st
(Spain) Fernando Torres	(England) Liverpool	1st

Coach: (Scotland) Alex Ferguson ( (England) Manchester United)

== Team of the Year 2009 ==
Player	Team(s)	Appearance
(Spain) Iker Casillas	(Spain) Real Madrid	3rd
(Brazil) Dani Alves	(Spain) Barcelona	2nd
(England) John Terry	(England) Chelsea	4th
(Spain) Carles Puyol	(Spain) Barcelona	5th
(France) Patrice Evra	(England) Manchester United	1st
(Portugal) Cristiano Ronaldo	(England) Manchester United (Spain) Real Madrid	4th
(Spain) Xavi	(Spain) Barcelona	2nd
(Brazil) Kaká	(Italy) Milan (Spain) Real Madrid	3rd
(Spain) Andrés Iniesta	(Spain) Barcelona	1st
(Argentina) Lionel Messi	(Spain) Barcelona	2nd
(Sweden) Zlatan Ibrahimović	(Italy) Internazionale (Spain) Barcelona	2nd

Coach: (Spain) Pep Guardiola ( (Spain) Barcelona)

Players who played for two teams during the voting year have the club they transferred to during a transfer window listed second.

== Team of the Year 2010 ==
Player	Team(s)	Appearance
(Spain) Iker Casillas	(Spain) Real Madrid	4th
(Brazil) Maicon	(Italy) Internazionale	1st
(Spain) Gerard Piqué	(Spain) Barcelona	1st
(Spain) Carles Puyol	(Spain) Barcelona	6th
(England) Ashley Cole	(England) Chelsea	2nd
(Portugal) Cristiano Ronaldo	(Spain) Real Madrid	5th
(Spain) Xavi	(Spain) Barcelona	3rd
(Netherlands) Wesley Sneijder	(Italy) Internazionale	1st
(Spain) Andrés Iniesta	(Spain) Barcelona	2nd
(Argentina) Lionel Messi	(Spain) Barcelona	3rd
(Spain) David Villa	(Spain) Valencia (Spain) Barcelona	1st

Coach: (Portugal) José Mourinho ( (Italy) Internazionale / (Spain) Real Madrid)

Players who played for two teams during the voting year have the club they transferred to during a transfer window listed second.

== Team of the Year 2011 ==
Player	Team(s)	Appearance
(Spain) Iker Casillas	(Spain) Real Madrid	5th
(Brazil) Dani Alves	(Spain) Barcelona	3rd
(Spain) Gerard Piqué	(Spain) Barcelona	2nd
(Brazil) Thiago Silva	(Italy) Milan	1st
(Brazil) Marcelo	(Spain) Real Madrid	1st
(Netherlands) Arjen Robben	(Germany) Bayern Munich	1st
(Spain) Xavi	(Spain) Barcelona	4th
(Spain) Andrés Iniesta	(Spain) Barcelona	3rd
(Wales) Gareth Bale	(England) Tottenham Hotspur	1st
(Argentina) Lionel Messi	(Spain) Barcelona	4th
(Portugal) Cristiano Ronaldo	(Spain) Real Madrid	6th

Voting for a coach ended this year.

== Team of the Year 2012 ==
Player	Team(s)	Appearance
(Spain) Iker Casillas	(Spain) Real Madrid	6th
(Spain) Sergio Ramos	(Spain) Real Madrid	2nd
(Spain) Gerard Piqué	(Spain) Barcelona	3rd
(Brazil) Thiago Silva	(Italy) Milan (France) Paris Saint-Germain	2nd
(Germany) Philipp Lahm	(Germany) Bayern Munich	3rd
(Spain) Andrés Iniesta	(Spain) Barcelona	4th
(Spain) Xavi	(Spain) Barcelona	5th
(Italy) Andrea Pirlo	(Italy) Juventus	1st
(Germany) Mesut Özil	(Spain) Real Madrid	1st
(Argentina) Lionel Messi	(Spain) Barcelona	5th
(Portugal) Cristiano Ronaldo	(Spain) Real Madrid	7th

Players who played for two teams during the voting year have the club they transferred to during a transfer window listed second.

== Team of the Year 2013 ==
Player	Team(s)	Appearance
(Germany) Manuel Neuer	(Germany) Bayern Munich	1st
(Germany) Philipp Lahm	(Germany) Bayern Munich	4th
(Brazil) Thiago Silva	(France) Paris Saint-Germain	3rd
(Spain) Sergio Ramos	(Spain) Real Madrid	3rd
(Austria) David Alaba	(Germany) Bayern Munich	1st
(Wales) Gareth Bale	(England) Tottenham Hotspur (Spain) Real Madrid	2nd
(Germany) Marco Reus	(Germany) Borussia Dortmund	1st
(Germany) Mesut Özil	(Spain) Real Madrid (England) Arsenal	2nd
(France) Franck Ribéry	(Germany) Bayern Munich	2nd
(Sweden) Zlatan Ibrahimović	(France) Paris Saint-Germain	3rd
(Portugal) Cristiano Ronaldo	(Spain) Real Madrid	8th

Players who played for two teams during the voting year have the club they transferred to during a transfer window listed second.

== Team of the Year 2014 ==
Player	Team(s)	Appearance
(Germany) Manuel Neuer	(Germany) Bayern Munich	2nd
(Germany) Philipp Lahm	(Germany) Bayern Munich	5th
(Spain) Sergio Ramos	(Spain) Real Madrid	4th
(Uruguay) Diego Godín	(Spain) Atlético Madrid	1st
(Austria) David Alaba	(Germany) Bayern Munich	2nd
(Netherlands) Arjen Robben	(Germany) Bayern Munich	2nd
(Germany) Toni Kroos	(Germany) Bayern Munich (Spain) Real Madrid	1st
(Argentina) Ángel Di María	(Spain) Real Madrid (England) Manchester United	1st
(Argentina) Lionel Messi	(Spain) Barcelona	6th
(Sweden) Zlatan Ibrahimović	(France) Paris Saint-Germain	4th
(Portugal) Cristiano Ronaldo	(Spain) Real Madrid	9th

Players who played for two teams during the voting year have the club they transferred to during a transfer window listed second.

== Team of the Year 2015 ==
Player	Team(s)	Appearance
(Germany) Manuel Neuer	(Germany) Bayern Munich	3rd
(Brazil) Dani Alves	(Spain) Barcelona	4th
(Spain) Sergio Ramos	(Spain) Real Madrid	5th
(Spain) Gerard Piqué	(Spain) Barcelona	4th
(Austria) David Alaba	(Germany) Bayern Munich	3rd
(France) Paul Pogba	(Italy) Juventus	1st
(Spain) Andrés Iniesta	(Spain) Barcelona	5th
(Colombia) James Rodríguez	(Spain) Real Madrid	1st
(Portugal) Cristiano Ronaldo	(Spain) Real Madrid	10th
(Argentina) Lionel Messi	(Spain) Barcelona	7th
(Brazil) Neymar	(Spain) Barcelona	1st

== Team of the Year 2016 ==
Player	Team(s)	Appearance
(Italy) Gianluigi Buffon	(Italy) Juventus	4th
(Germany) Jérôme Boateng	(Germany) Bayern Munich	1st
(Spain) Sergio Ramos	(Spain) Real Madrid	6th
(Spain) Gerard Piqué	(Spain) Barcelona	5th
(Italy) Leonardo Bonucci	(Italy) Juventus	1st
(Croatia) Luka Modrić	(Spain) Real Madrid	1st
(Germany) Toni Kroos	(Spain) Real Madrid	2nd
(Spain) Andrés Iniesta	(Spain) Barcelona	6th
(Argentina) Lionel Messi	(Spain) Barcelona	8th
(France) Antoine Griezmann	(Spain) Atlético Madrid	1st
(Portugal) Cristiano Ronaldo	(Spain) Real Madrid	11th

== Team of the Year 2017 ==
Player	Team(s)	Appearance
(Italy) Gianluigi Buffon	(Italy) Juventus	5th
(Brazil) Dani Alves	(Italy) Juventus (France) Paris Saint-Germain	5th
(Spain) Sergio Ramos	(Spain) Real Madrid	7th
(Italy) Giorgio Chiellini	(Italy) Juventus	1st
(Brazil) Marcelo	(Spain) Real Madrid	2nd
(Croatia) Luka Modrić	(Spain) Real Madrid	2nd
(Germany) Toni Kroos	(Spain) Real Madrid	3rd
(Belgium) Kevin De Bruyne	(England) Manchester City	1st
(Belgium) Eden Hazard	(England) Chelsea	1st
(Argentina) Lionel Messi	(Spain) Barcelona	9th
(Portugal) Cristiano Ronaldo	(Spain) Real Madrid	12th

== Team of the Year 2018 ==
Player	Team(s)	Appearance
(Germany) Marc-André ter Stegen	(Spain) Barcelona	1st
(Spain) Sergio Ramos	(Spain) Real Madrid	8th
(Netherlands) Virgil van Dijk	(England) Liverpool	1st
(France) Raphaël Varane	(Spain) Real Madrid	1st
(Brazil) Marcelo	(Spain) Real Madrid	3rd
(Croatia) Luka Modrić	(Spain) Real Madrid	3rd
(France) N'Golo Kanté	(England) Chelsea	1st
(Belgium) Eden Hazard	(England) Chelsea	2nd
(France) Kylian Mbappé	(France) Paris Saint-Germain	1st
(Argentina) Lionel Messi	(Spain) Barcelona	10th
(Portugal) Cristiano Ronaldo	(Spain) Real Madrid (Italy) Juventus	13th

== Team of the Year 2019 ==
Player	Team(s)	Appearance
(Brazil) Alisson	(England) Liverpool	1st
(England) Trent Alexander-Arnold	(England) Liverpool	1st
(Netherlands) Matthijs de Ligt	(Netherlands) Ajax (Italy) Juventus	1st
(Netherlands) Virgil van Dijk	(England) Liverpool	2nd
(Scotland) Andy Robertson	(England) Liverpool	1st
(Netherlands) Frenkie de Jong	(Netherlands) Ajax (Spain) Barcelona	1st
(Belgium) Kevin De Bruyne	(England) Manchester City	2nd
(Argentina) Lionel Messi	(Spain) Barcelona	11th
(Portugal) Cristiano Ronaldo	(Italy) Juventus	14th
(Poland) Robert Lewandowski	(Germany) Bayern Munich	1st
(Senegal) Sadio Mané	(England) Liverpool	1st

== Team of the Year 2020 ==
Player	Team(s)	Appearance
(Germany) Manuel Neuer	(Germany) Bayern Munich	4th
(Germany) Joshua Kimmich	(Germany) Bayern Munich	1st
(Spain) Sergio Ramos	(Spain) Real Madrid	9th
(Netherlands) Virgil van Dijk	(England) Liverpool	3rd
(Canada) Alphonso Davies	(Germany) Bayern Munich	1st
(Spain) Thiago	(Germany) Bayern Munich (England) Liverpool	1st
(Belgium) Kevin De Bruyne	(England) Manchester City	3rd
(Argentina) Lionel Messi	(Spain) Barcelona	12th
(Portugal) Cristiano Ronaldo	(Italy) Juventus	15th
(Poland) Robert Lewandowski	(Germany) Bayern Munich	2nd
(Brazil) Neymar	(France) Paris Saint-Germain	2nd

== Most appearances ==
=== By player ===
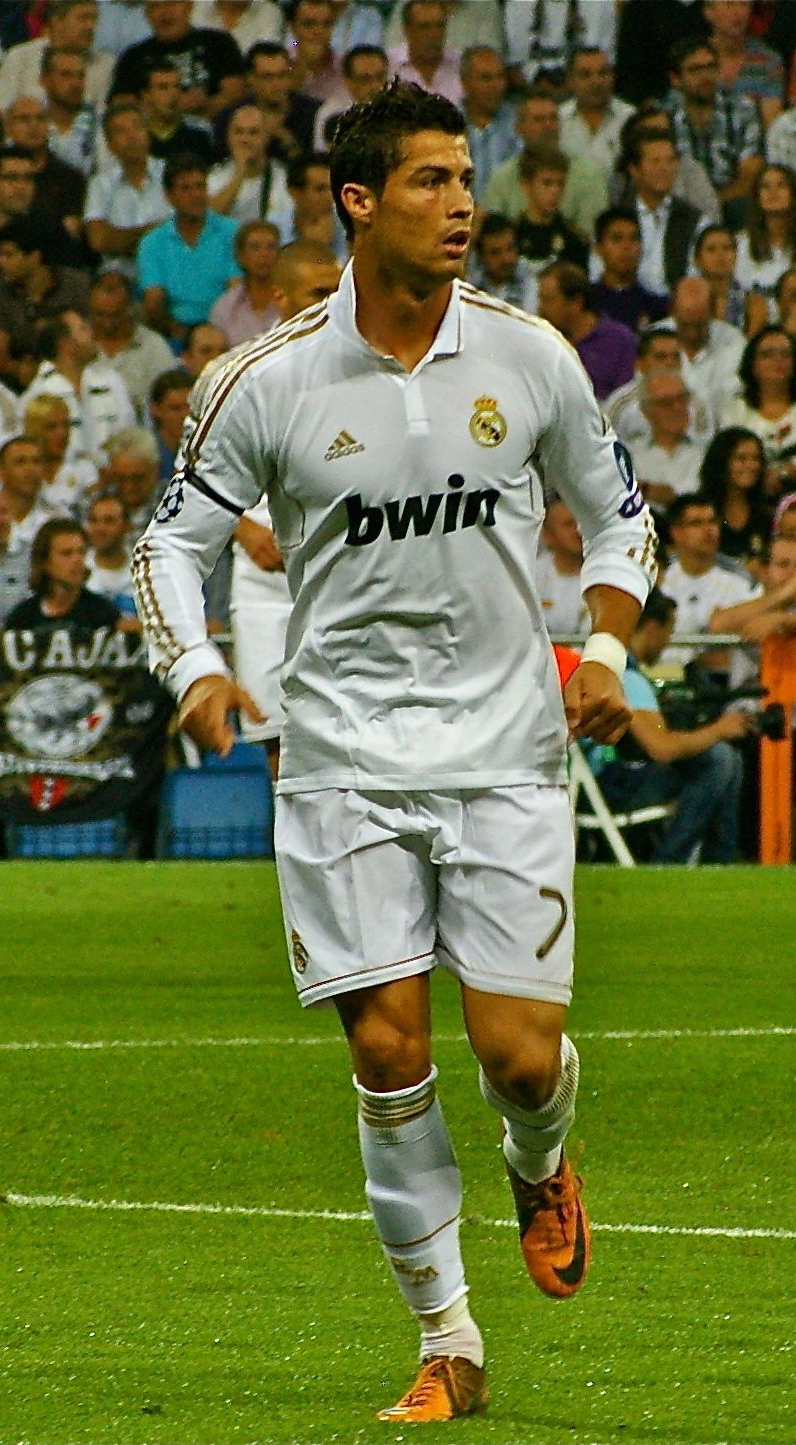
Cristiano Ronaldo has made the most appearances in the UEFA Team of the Year with 15 in total. He also made 14 consecutive appearances.

Player	Appearances
(Portugal) Cristiano Ronaldo	15
(Argentina) Lionel Messi	12
(Spain) Sergio Ramos	9
(Spain) Iker Casillas	6
(Spain) Andrés Iniesta	6
(Spain) Carles Puyol	6
(Brazil) Dani Alves	5
(Italy) Gianluigi Buffon	5
(France) Thierry Henry	5
(Germany) Philipp Lahm	5
(Spain) Gerard Piqué	5
(Spain) Xavi	5
(Sweden) Zlatan Ibrahimović	4
(Italy) Alessandro Nesta	4
(Germany) Manuel Neuer	4
(England) John Terry	4
(Austria) David Alaba	3
(Belgium) Kevin De Bruyne	3
(England) Steven Gerrard	3
(Brazil) Kaká	3
(Germany) Toni Kroos	3
(Brazil) Marcelo	3
(Croatia) Luka Modrić	3
(Czech Republic) Pavel Nedvěd	3
(Brazil) Ronaldinho	3
(Brazil) Thiago Silva	3
(Netherlands) Virgil van Dijk	3
(France) Zinedine Zidane	3
(Wales) Gareth Bale	2
(England) David Beckham	2
(Brazil) Cafu	2
(England) Ashley Cole	2
(Cameroon) Samuel Eto'o	2
(Spain) Cesc Fàbregas	2
(Belgium) Eden Hazard	2
(Poland) Robert Lewandowski	2
(Italy) Paolo Maldini	2
(Brazil) Neymar	2
(Germany) Mesut Özil	2
(France) Franck Ribéry	2
(Netherlands) Arjen Robben	2
(Brazil) Roberto Carlos	2
(Netherlands) Clarence Seedorf	2
(Ukraine) Andriy Shevchenko	2
56 players	1

=== By coach ===
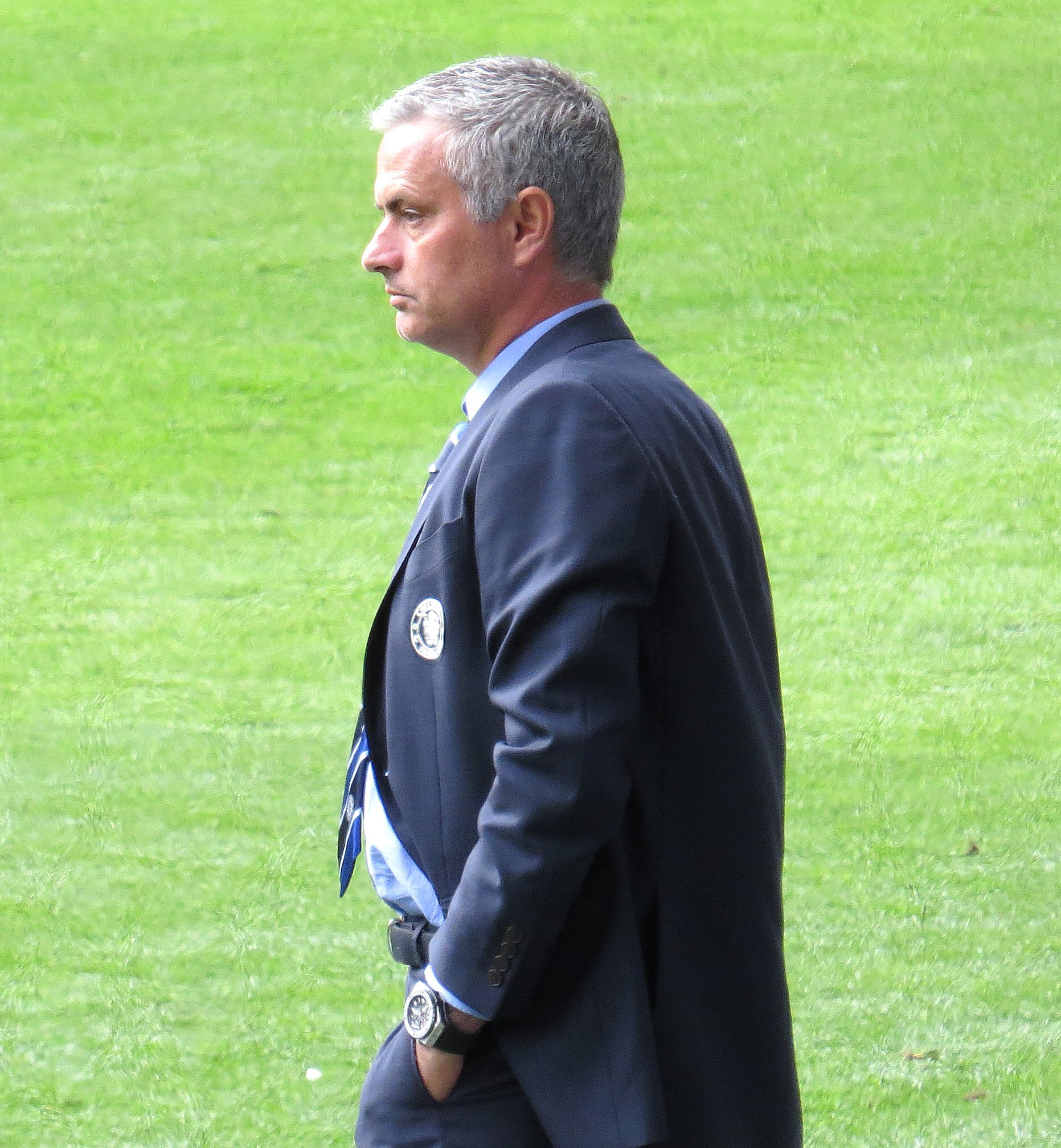
José Mourinho is the coach with the most appearances (4) in the UEFA Team of the Year.

Coach	Appearances
(Portugal) José Mourinho	4
(Scotland) Alex Ferguson	2
(Spain) Pep Guardiola	1
(Turkey) Şenol Güneş	1
(France) Gérard Houllier	1
(Netherlands) Frank Rijkaard	1

=== By club ===
Club	Players
(Spain) Barcelona	40
(Spain) Real Madrid	40
(Germany) Bayern Munich	26
(Italy) Juventus	21
(England) Liverpool	19
(Italy) Milan	18
(England) Chelsea	11
(England) Arsenal	10
(England) Manchester United	9
(Italy) Internazionale	6
(France) Paris Saint-Germain	6
(Netherlands) Ajax	5
(England) Manchester City	4
(Portugal) Porto	3
(Spain) Valencia	3
(Spain) Atlético Madrid	2
(England) Tottenham Hotspur	2
(Spain) Alavés	1
(Germany) Bayer Leverkusen	1
(England) Blackburn Rovers	1
(Germany) Borussia Dortmund	1
(Turkey) Fenerbahçe	1
(Italy) Lazio	1
(France) Lyon	1
(Spain) Sevilla	1

=== By country ===
Country	Players
Spain	44
Brazil	26
France	20
Germany	19
Portugal	19
Italy	16
Argentina	13
England	11
Netherlands	8
Sweden	5
Belgium	4
Czech Republic	4
Austria	3
Croatia	3
Cameroon	2
Poland	2
Romania	2
Ukraine	2
Wales	2
Canada	1
Colombia	1
Finland	1
Ivory Coast	1
Republic of Ireland	1
Scotland	1
Senegal	1
Turkey	1
Uruguay	1

== UEFA Ultimate Team of the Year ==
In November 2015, UEFA published their Ultimate Team of the Year, composed of the 18 players (11 starters and 7 substitutes) with the all-time most appearances in the UEFA Team of the Year, since its inception in 2001.

All-time XI
Goalkeeper	Defenders	Midfielders	Forwards
(Spain) Iker Casillas (Real Madrid/Porto)	(Germany) Philipp Lahm (Bayern Munich) (Spain) Carles Puyol (Barcelona) (Italy) Alessandro Nesta (Lazio/Milan) (Spain) Sergio Ramos (Real Madrid)	(Spain) Andrés Iniesta (Barcelona) (England) Steven Gerrard (Liverpool) (Spain) Xavi (Barcelona)	(Portugal) Cristiano Ronaldo (Manchester United/Real Madrid) (France) Thierry Henry (Arsenal) (Argentina) Lionel Messi (Barcelona)

Substitutes
Player	Appearances (as of 2015)
(England) John Terry	4
(Sweden) Zlatan Ibrahimović	4
(Italy) Gianluigi Buffon	3
(Czech Republic) Pavel Nedvěd	3
(France) Zinedine Zidane	3
(Brazil) Ronaldinho	3
(Brazil) Kaká	3

In November 2017, UEFA published an UEFA all-time XI of the century so far, their second Ultimate Team of the Year, composed of the 11 players with the all-time most appearances in the UEFA Team of the Year, since its inception in 2001.

All-time XI
Goalkeeper	Defenders	Midfielders	Forwards
(Spain) Iker Casillas (Real Madrid)	(Germany) Philipp Lahm (Bayern Munich) (Spain) Carles Puyol (Barcelona) (Spain) Gerard Piqué (Barcelona) (Spain) Sergio Ramos (Real Madrid)	(Spain) Andrés Iniesta (Barcelona) (England) Steven Gerrard (Liverpool) (Spain) Xavi (Barcelona)	(Portugal) Cristiano Ronaldo (Manchester United/Real Madrid) (France) Thierry Henry (Arsenal) (Argentina) Lionel Messi (Barcelona)

== See also ==
- UEFA Club Footballer of the Year
- UEFA Club Football Awards
- UEFA Men's Player of the Year Award
