= Virgil van Dijk =

Dutch footballer (born 1991)

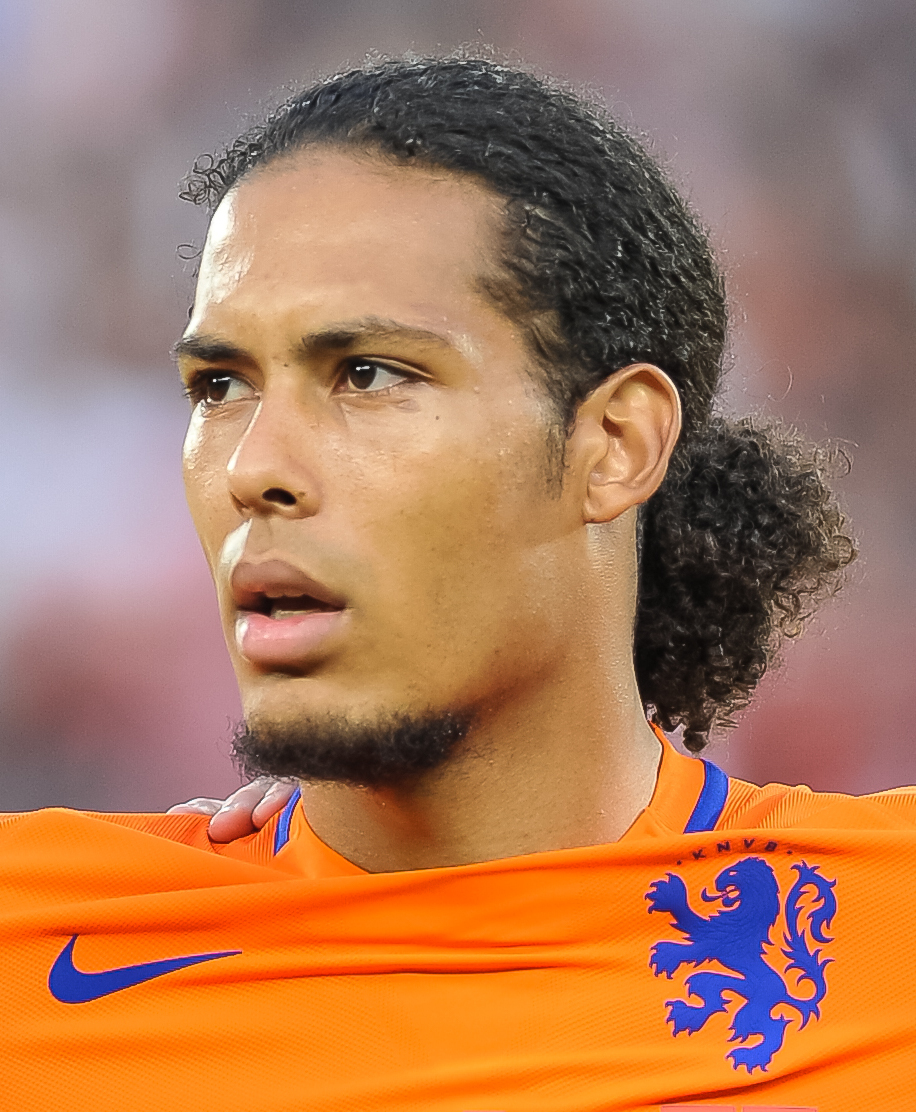
- Van Dijk lining up for the Netherlands in 2016

Personal information
- Full name: Virgil van Dijk
- Date of birth: 8 July 1991 (age 35)
- Place of birth: Breda, Netherlands
- Height: 1.95 m (6 ft 5 in)
- Position: Centre-back

Team information
- Current team: Liverpool
- Number: 4

Youth career
- WDS'19
- 1999–2010: Willem II
- 2010–2011: Groningen

Senior career*
Years	Team	Apps	(Gls)
2011–2013	Groningen	62	(7)
2013–2015	Celtic	76	(9)
2015–2018	Southampton	67	(4)
2018–	Liverpool	283	(27)

International career^{‡}
2011	Netherlands U19	1	(0)
2011–2013	Netherlands U21	3	(0)
2015–	Netherlands	100	(14)
Medal record
Men's football
Representing Netherlands
UEFA European Championship
Bronze medal – third place	2024 Germany	Team
UEFA Nations League
Runner-up	2019 Portugal	Team
- * Club domestic league appearances and goals as of 18:33, 22 November 2026 (UTC) ‡ National team caps and goals as of 21:40, 4 October 2026 (UTC)

Virgil van Dijk (Dutch pronunciation: [ˈvɪrdʑɪl vɑn ˈdɛik]; born 8 July 1991) is a Dutch professional footballer who plays as a centre-back for and captains both Premier League club Liverpool and the Netherlands national team. Widely regarded as one of the best defenders of his generation and one of the greatest defenders in Premier League history, he is known for his strength, leadership, speed and aerial ability.

After beginning his professional career with Groningen, Van Dijk moved to Celtic in 2013. At Celtic, he won the Scottish Premiership and was named in the PFA Scotland Team of the Year in both of his seasons with the club, and won the Scottish League Cup in the second. In 2015, he joined Southampton before signing for Liverpool in January 2018 for £75 million, a then-world-record transfer fee for a defender. With Liverpool, Van Dijk reached back-to-back UEFA Champions League finals in 2018 and 2019, winning the latter. He was also named PFA Players' Player of the Year and the Premier League Player of the Season in his first full season. Van Dijk later won the FIFA Club World Cup and UEFA Super Cup, and helped end the club's 30-year league title drought by winning the 2019–20 Premier League. He is the only defender to win the UEFA Men's Player of the Year Award, and has finished runner-up for both the Ballon d'Or and Best FIFA Men's Player, all in 2019. Van Dijk has also been selected in the FIFPRO Men's World 11 in five different years.

Van Dijk represented the Netherlands at under-19 and under-21 levels. He made his senior international debut for the Netherlands in 2015 and assumed full captaincy of the national team in March 2018. The following year, Van Dijk captained the Netherlands to the final of the inaugural UEFA Nations League, where they finished runners-up. He also captained his national side to the quarter-finals of the 2022 FIFA World Cup and the semi-finals of UEFA Euro 2024.

== Early life ==
Virgil van Dijk was born on 8 July 1991 in Breda, North Brabant, to a Dutch father, Ron van Dijk, and a Surinamese mother, Hellen Chin Fo Sieeuw, who is Afro-Surinamese and of part Chinese descent. The Chinese surname Chin Fo Sieeuw derives from the given name of his maternal great-grandfather, Chin Fo Sieeuw (Chinese: 陳火秀, romanised: Chén Huǒxiù), who emigrated from Guangdong to Suriname around 1920. He has a younger brother and sister, who are two and ten years younger than him respectively.

Van Dijk grew up in Kesteren, in the Haagse Beemden district of Breda. His father left the family when he was 11 years old. Van Dijk first lived with his father for a while before making the choice to go back to live with his mother, after which his father broke off contact.

Growing up he played football wherever he could – on the streets, in concrete cages, and eventually Saturday morning matches. He started playing football in the youth team at WDS'19 before joining Willem II at the age of 8. He combined his time playing at the Willem II academy with a part-time job as a dishwasher as a teenager. He said: "I didn't have a contract at that time. I wasn't thinking I had no future in the game, but I also knew I had to work, to try to make money."

Having previously, and unsuccessfully, featured as a right-back, Van Dijk was shifted into a central defensive position in 2008, aged 17, after he grew in height by around 18 centimetres. Despite the positional shift and Van Dijk's physical growth, Willem II's reserve manager at the time Edwin Hermans believed he had "too many limitations", which prevented him from breaking into the first team. The club therefore did not want to offer him a contract. He left for FC Groningen at the age of 19 in 2010, on a free transfer, after being scouted by former Dutch international Martin Koeman, who was working for Groningen at the time.

== Club career ==
=== FC Groningen ===
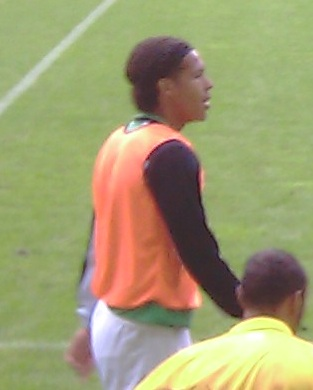
Van Dijk with FC Groningen in 2011

Van Dijk initially struggled to break into Groningen's first team with club staff believing he was "overtired" after extensive playing time with Willem II's academy and reserve sides. He made his professional debut for the club on 1 May 2011, coming on as a 72nd-minute substitute for Petter Andersson during a 4–2 victory against ADO Den Haag. On 29 May, and against the same opposition, he made his first start for Groningen and scored his first professional goals, netting twice in a 5–1 win in a UEFA Europa League play-off match.

During the 2011–12 Eredivisie season, Van Dijk made 23 league appearances for the Eredivisie team, and scored his first regular-season goal during the club's 6–0 victory over Feyenoord on 30 October 2011. He suffered a personal setback during the campaign, however, as soon after his 20th birthday he was admitted to hospital with advanced appendicitis, peritonitis, and kidney poisoning. The ailments were previously not recognised by the medical staff of Groningen and the local hospital. Van Dijk underwent an urgent lifesaving operation, after which he spent 13 days in hospital, lost nearly 16 kg (35 lb; 2.5 st), and could not walk for 10 days. As he had been close to dying as a result of the medical emergency, the hospital had even gone so far as to ask him to sign a "sort of will" in the event of his death.

It took Van Dijk a few months to fully recover. In the summer of 2012, he returned and joined the selection again. Despite the fact that the club had a changeable season, Van Dijk, who played in the centre of defence together with veteran Kees Kwakman, excelled.

In the summer of 2013, Van Dijk was a candidate to strengthen PSV's defence, but the club ultimately opted for Jeffrey Bruma as the new central defender. A transfer to Brighton & Hove Albion FC or Krasnodar, both of which wanted to meet the asking price of Groningen director Hans Nijland, were rejected by Van Dijk himself. Van Dijk, who actually preferred a transfer to a Dutch top club, contacted Marc Overmars himself via director Nijland and his agent to discuss a possible transfer to Ajax. However, the club, which was on the market for a new central defender at the time, decided not to accept Van Dijk's advances and eventually signed Mike van der Hoorn from Utrecht.

=== Celtic ===
==== 2013–14 season ====
On 21 June 2013, Van Dijk signed with Celtic for a fee of around £2.6 million, on a four-year deal including a 10% selling-on fee for Groningen. He made his debut on 17 August, replacing Efe Ambrose for the final 13 minutes of a 2–0 Scottish Premiership win over Aberdeen at Pittodrie. A week later, he made his first start, in a 2–2 draw with Inverness Caledonian Thistle at Celtic Park. On 9 November, Van Dijk scored his first Celtic goals, heading one in each half of a 4–1 win against Ross County. After a solo run, he scored the only goal of a victory over St Johnstone on 26 December.

Van Dijk scored again on 26 January 2014, in a 4–0 win versus Hibernian for Celtic's 11th consecutive league win. On 25 February, he was sent off after 13 minutes of an eventual 2–1 loss at Aberdeen, for a professional foul on Peter Pawlett; it was Celtic's first defeat of the season. With Celtic having already won the league, Van Dijk netted again on 7 May to put his team 3–1 up away to St Johnstone, in an eventual 3–3 draw. He was one of three Celtic players named in the PFA Scotland Team of the Year. Van Dijk was nominated for the PFA Scotland Players' Player of the Year award, but lost out to fellow Celtic player Kris Commons.

==== 2014–15 season ====
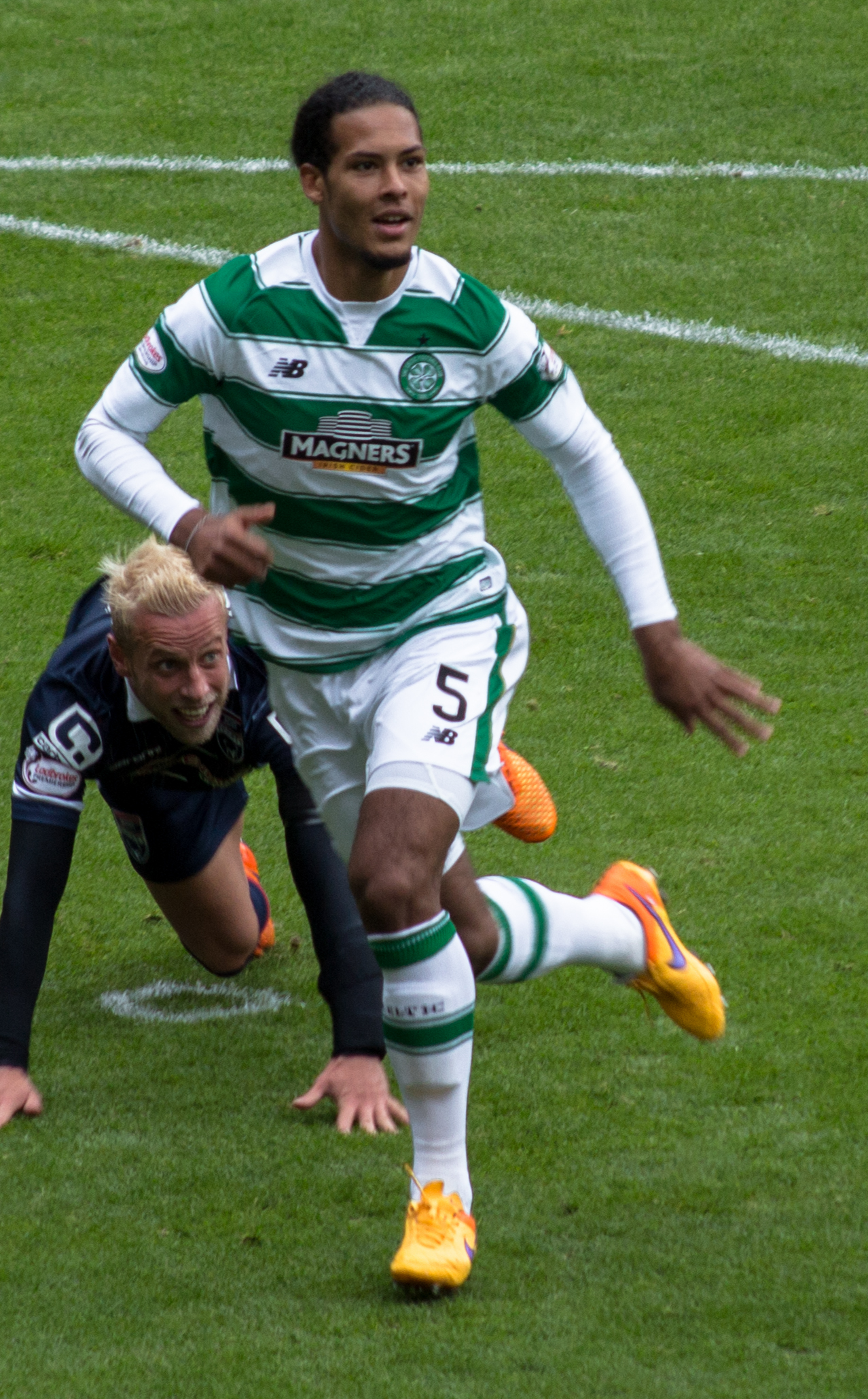
Van Dijk playing for Celtic in 2015

On 22 July 2014, Van Dijk and Teemu Pukki each scored twice in a 4–0 home win over KR in a UEFA Champions League qualifier, putting their team into the next round 5–0 on aggregate. His first goal of the Premiership season came on 9 November, finishing from Stefan Johansen's last-minute corner for a 2–1 win at Aberdeen. Three weeks later, Van Dijk scored the first and last goals of Celtic's 4–0 win versus Heart of Midlothian in the fourth round of the Scottish Cup. Four days after that, his sixth goal of the season was enough for victory in a home match against Glasgow neighbours Partick Thistle.

Van Dijk was again on target on 21 January 2015, opening a 4–0 home win over Motherwell. On 26 February, he was sent off in the 36th minute against Inter Milan for a foul on Mauro Icardi, as Celtic lost 1–0 on the night, 4–3 on aggregate in the last 32 of the UEFA Europa League. He was again sent off on 8 March in the Cup quarter-final away to Dundee United at Tannadice Park, receiving a red card after eleven minutes for a confrontation with Calum Butcher. His suspension for the following week's Scottish League Cup final was overturned on appeal, as was that of Paul Paton, who was sent off when mistaken for Butcher. Van Dijk played the full 90 minutes of the final at Hampden Park, which Celtic won 2–0. On 18 March, Celtic's third consecutive match against Dundee United, Van Dijk scored in the last minute to confirm a 4–0 win in a Cup replay.

On 19 April, Celtic contested the Cup semi-final against Inverness at Hampden, and Van Dijk opened the scoring with a free kick. After the dismissal of goalkeeper Craig Gordon, Celtic fell 3–2, ending their chance of a treble. Three days later, again from a free kick, he confirmed a 2–1 win away to Dundee. His team again won the league, and Van Dijk was included in the league's Team of the Season for the second consecutive campaign. He was again shortlisted for the PFA Scotland Players' Player award, but lost out to another teammate, this time Stefan Johansen.

Van Dijk was reportedly "considering his future" in Glasgow after Celtic were knocked out of the 2015–16 UEFA Champions League in the qualifying rounds to Malmö of Sweden.

=== Southampton ===
==== 2015–16 season ====
On 1 September 2015, the last day of the transfer window, Van Dijk signed a five-year contract with Premier League club Southampton, managed by Ronald Koeman, for a reported £13 million transfer fee. Fellow Premier League clubs Sunderland, Newcastle and Arsenal were also reportedly interested in the last hours of the transfer window. The transfer made him the most expensive Dutch defender since Jaap Stam, who went from Manchester United to Lazio in 2001 for more than €25 million.

He made his debut for Southampton on 12 September in a 0–0 draw against West Bromwich Albion at The Hawthorns. Two weeks later, Van Dijk marked his third Premier League appearance with his first goal for the club, which came in the form of a header in the 11th minute to put Southampton in front, following a set-piece from James Ward-Prowse in a 3–1 home win over Swansea City. He was named player of the year by both his teammates and Southampton fans for his first season. On 7 May 2016, Van Dijk signed a new six-year contract with the Saints.

==== 2016–17 season ====
On 22 January 2017, he was named captain of Southampton, after the departure of José Fonte. On the same day, he suffered an ankle injury against Leicester City. This ruled him out of the 2017 EFL Cup final, which Southampton lost to Manchester United at Wembley.

After a successful 2016–17 season at Southampton, Van Dijk was subject to interest from top English clubs with Chelsea, Manchester City and Liverpool reportedly interested. Liverpool apologised to Southampton for an illegal approach for the player after he had reportedly made clear his interest in a move to Merseyside. On 7 August 2017, Van Dijk handed in a transfer request to Southampton and released a statement along with it, emphasising his wish to join a different club in the transfer window.

==== 2017–18 season ====
Van Dijk remained with Southampton for the start of the 2017–18 season and made his first appearance since being injured in January, coming on as a late substitute in a 1–0 victory at Crystal Palace on 26 September. He made what turned out to be his final appearance for Southampton on 13 December 2017, in a 4–1 home defeat to Leicester. It was also his last appearance in any of Southampton's matchday squads, as he was omitted from the squad for the rest of his tenure at the club in light of speculation surrounding his future.

=== Liverpool ===
==== 2017–18 season ====
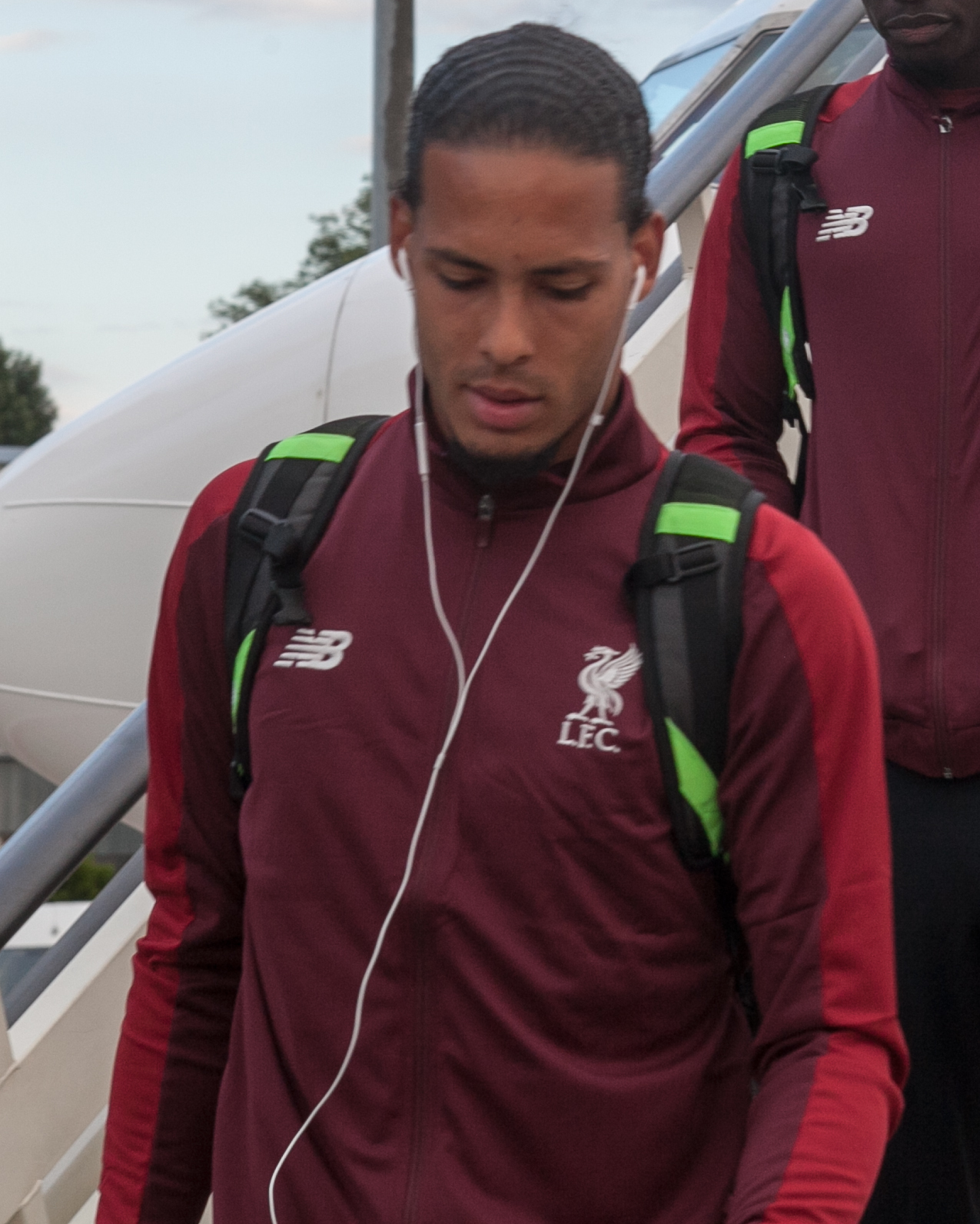
Van Dijk with Liverpool in 2018

On 27 December 2017, it was announced that Van Dijk would join Liverpool when the winter transfer window opened on 1 January 2018 for a reported fee of £75 million. Former club Celtic would receive 10% of Van Dijk's transfer fee, due to a sell-on clause placed in his Southampton contract. Southampton claimed the undisclosed transfer fee would constitute a world record fee in football for a defender.

Van Dijk made his debut for Liverpool on 5 January in the third round of the FA Cup and scored the winning goal with a late header in a 2–1 victory against local rivals Everton. In doing so, he became the first player since Bill White in 1901 to score on his debut in the Merseyside derby. Van Dijk and Dejan Lovren built a strong partnership at the heart of Liverpool's defence, with the Dutchman being credited for improving Liverpool's previous defensive issues. Van Dijk was included in the UEFA Champions League Squad of the Season, despite playing just half of the season in the Champions League, with the UEFA Technical Observers saying: "Van Dijk arrived at Anfield and provided composure and stability in the competition's knockout stages." Van Dijk played the full 90 minutes in the 2018 UEFA Champions League final against Real Madrid, which Liverpool lost 3–1. Van Dijk played 22 games in all competitions in his first season with the club, scoring once.

==== 2018–19 season ====
Van Dijk received the Liverpool Player of the Month award for his performances in August. On 2 December, Van Dijk was awarded an assist for the winning goal in a derby match against city rivals Everton. Liverpool won 1–0 thanks to Divock Origi's 96th-minute goal, set up by a Van Dijk volley and a subsequent error from Everton goalkeeper Jordan Pickford. The Dutchman was ultimately awarded the PFA Player of the Month for November 2018. On 21 December, Van Dijk scored his first goal in the Premier League for Liverpool in a 2–0 away win against Wolverhampton Wanderers. The Dutchman continued his impressive form in the 2018–19 season by winning the Premier League Player of the Month prize for December 2018.

On 27 February 2019, Van Dijk scored twice in a 5–0 win against Watford. The following month, he scored once – his first goal in the Champions League for the club – and assisted another in a 3–1 win over Bayern Munich. On 20 April, he was one of six players nominated for the PFA Players' Player of the Year award alongside teammate Sadio Mané. Four days later, he was named in the PFA Team of the Year alongside Liverpool teammates, Trent Alexander-Arnold, Mané and Andrew Robertson. On 28 April 2019, he was named the PFA Players' Player of the Year. Following Liverpool's 2–0 victory over Tottenham Hotspur in the 2019 UEFA Champions League final on 1 June, Van Dijk was named UEFA's man of the match.

==== 2019–20 season ====
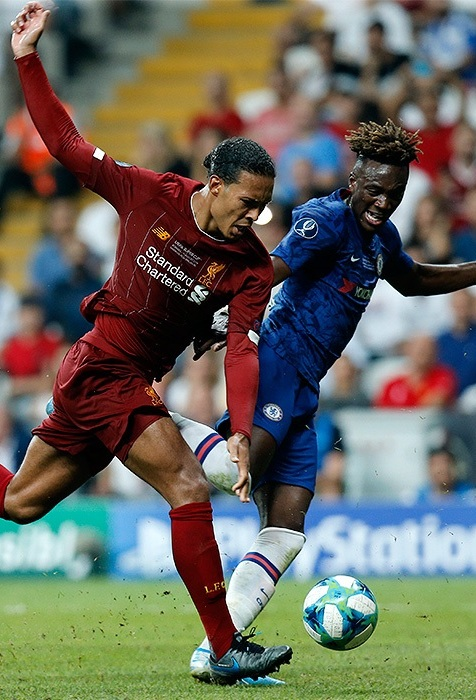
Van Dijk playing for Liverpool in the 2019 UEFA Super Cup

In August 2019, Van Dijk won the UEFA Men's Player of the Year Award. On 2 September 2019, he was shortlisted in the final three of the best FIFA football awards. On 23 September 2019, he was voted runner-up in The Best FIFA Men's Player and into the FIFA FIFpro Men's World 11. In October 2019, Van Dijk was shortlisted as one in 30 football players for the Ballon d'Or. At the event in December, he finished runner-up behind Lionel Messi. The edition of the award was controversial in that while many believed that Messi was the justified winner of the award, many others believed that Van Dijk had been unfairly overlooked, with teammate Fabinho stating that "People always notice strikers more than defenders, but he should have won when you consider what he did individually and how he helped the team win the Champions League". On 21 December 2019, after missing the semi-final of the 2019 FIFA Club World Cup with illness, Van Dijk played in the final against Flamengo with Liverpool winning the trophy for the first time in the club's history.

Van Dijk received further recognition following the turn of the year, when he was named in the 2019 UEFA Team of the Year. On 19 January 2020, Van Dijk scored his first North-West Derby goal against Manchester United in Liverpool's 2–0 win at Anfield in the Premier League. Over the course of the 2019–20 domestic campaign, Van Dijk started and completed every minute for Liverpool. Liverpool won the Premier League title in the 2019–20 season, their first top-flight title in 30 years.

==== 2020–21 season ====
On 12 September 2020, Van Dijk scored a headed goal against Leeds United on the opening day of the new season. On 17 October, he was substituted in the sixth minute of the Merseyside derby after a challenge from Everton goalkeeper Jordan Pickford. On the following day, it was announced that he had suffered an ACL injury in his right knee and would undergo surgery. Van Dijk was expected to be out from six to twelve months. On 30 October it was announced that the surgery on his injuries had been successful. Dutch national team coach Frank de Boer had hoped that Van Dijk would be able to make his return before UEFA Euro 2020, Van Dijk however decided that he should continue his rehabilitation so he could start the next season fully fit.

==== 2021–22 season ====
Van Dijk made his first appearance in over nine months on 29 July 2021, coming on as a second-half substitute in a pre-season friendly against Hertha BSC. On 13 August 2021, Van Dijk signed a new four-year contract, keeping him at the club until 2025. His first goal for Liverpool in over 14 months came against his former club Southampton, when he hit a volley from a corner.

On 27 February 2022, Van Dijk helped Liverpool win the 2021–22 EFL Cup, scoring his penalty in the shoot-out over Chelsea after a goalless draw in normal time.

His performances during the 2021–22 season earned him a place in the Premier League PFA Team of the Year. Van Dijk earned a runners-up medal in the 2021–22 UEFA Champions League, losing the final to Real Madrid, and was selected as part of the Team of the Season. Liverpool narrowly missed out on the chance to achieve a historic quadruple, coming second in the Premier League and the 2021–22 UEFA Champions League but winning both the EFL Cup and the FA Cup.

==== 2022–23 season ====
On 29 October 2022, Liverpool lost 2–1 at home to Leeds United which was Van Dijk's first home defeat at Anfield in the Premier League after 70 games since joining the club in January 2018. Van Dijk was criticised for a number of performances in the 2022–23 season but soon regained his authoritative defensive traits with a performance against Brentford which led to him being voted Man of the Match by BBC Sport users. At the end of the 2022–23 season, Liverpool narrowly missed out on UEFA Champions League qualification.

==== 2023–24 season ====
On 31 July 2023, following the departure of Jordan Henderson, Van Dijk was named as Liverpool's new captain. On 27 August, Van Dijk was given his first Liverpool red card following a foul on Newcastle United's Alexander Isak. Initially, Van Dijk refused to leave the pitch and swore at referee John Brooks. Van Dijk was handed a one-match ban for the contentious red card, but was given an additional game ban after he admitted to acting in an 'improper manner' towards a match official. He was also fined £100,000 for his use of abusive words. On 25 February 2024, he won his first trophy as Liverpool captain and scored the only goal from a header in extra time of a 1–0 victory over Chelsea in the EFL Cup final. In the process, he was adjudged the man of the match and won the Alan Hardaker Trophy for the second time in his career, making him the fourth person to do so, along with John Terry, Vincent Kompany, and Ben Foster.

==== 2024–25 season ====
Van Dijk entered the final season of his current contract with no clear idea regarding his future at Liverpool. On 21 October, it was reported he began talks with the club about a new deal. In his 290th appearance for Liverpool, a 1–0 win over Girona in the UEFA Champions League in December 2024, Van Dijk became the first Liverpool player to reach 200 wins in under 300 appearances.

On 17 April 2025, Van Dijk signed a two-year contract extension, six days after Mohamed Salah also extended his contract.

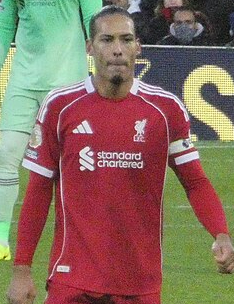
Van Dijk playing for Liverpool in 2026

On 27 April 2025, Liverpool were crowned Premier League champions after a 5–1 win at home against Tottenham Hotspur with Van Dijk winning a second Premier League title and first as captain. It was a record-tying 20th English league title for Liverpool.

On 25 May 2025, Liverpool were presented with the Premier League trophy after a 1–1 home draw with Crystal Palace on the final day of the season. Van Dijk received the trophy from former Liverpool captain Alan Hansen.

==== 2025–26 season ====
On 17 September 2025, Van Dijk scored his first goal of the 2025–26 season, the winning goal with a header against Atlético Madrid in a 3–2 win in the opening game of the 2025–26 UEFA Champions League league phase, On 13 December 2025, Van Dijk made his 250th Premier League appearance for Liverpool in a 2–0 home win against Brighton & Hove Albion. He concluded the season by becoming the oldest outfield player in Premier League history to play every minute of a campaign, surpassing the previous record held by John Terry, after featuring for the full 90 minutes in Liverpool's 1–1 draw against Brentford on the final day of the season at the age of 34 years and 320 days.

== International career ==
=== Youth career ===
On 12 May 2010, Van Dijk made his debut for the Netherlands U19 in a friendly against South Korea U19. Then on 14 November 2011, Van Dijk made his debut for the Netherlands U21 in a qualifying match against Scotland U21 and played a further two friendlies for the team.

=== Senior career ===
Van Dijk was selected for the Netherlands senior squad three times in 2014, but did not make his debut until 10 October 2015, when the Netherlands beat Kazakhstan 2–1 in a UEFA Euro 2016 qualifier. Three days later, he played in a 3–2 home loss to the Czech Republic which ensured the Netherlands would not qualify for UEFA Euro 2016. He played six of the Netherlands' ten matches in their unsuccessful 2018 FIFA World Cup qualification campaign.

Van Dijk was awarded the captaincy of his country by manager Ronald Koeman on 22 March 2018, leading the team for the first time in a 1–0 home friendly defeat by England the next day. On 26 March, he scored his first international goal to conclude a 3–0 win over European champions Portugal at the Stade de Genève. On 13 October, he scored in a 3–0 win over Germany in the group stage of the 2018–19 UEFA Nations League. On 19 November, he scored a 91st minute equalising goal in a 2–2 draw away to the same opposition to qualify the Netherlands from their Nations League group. In June 2019, Van Dijk captained the Netherlands at the 2019 UEFA Nations League Finals, where they finished as runner-up after being beaten 1–0 by host nation Portugal in the final on 9 June.

In May 2021, Van Dijk ruled himself out of playing in the postponed UEFA Euro 2020 to have enough time to recover after a long-term injury since October 2020. In November 2022, Van Dijk was announced as the Dutch captain for the 2022 FIFA World Cup. He led his team to the top of Group A with wins over Senegal and hosts Qatar. In the quarter-final match against Argentina, Van Dijk took the first kick of the tie-breaking penalty shootout which was saved by Argentine goalkeeper Emiliano Martínez as the Dutch were beaten 4–3 in Lusail.

In June 2023, Van Dijk was part of the Netherlands' squad for the 2023 UEFA Nations League Finals, where he captained the team against both Croatia in the semi-final and Italy in the third place play-off. On 29 May 2024, Van Dijk was named in the Netherlands' squad for UEFA Euro 2024, and led his country to the semi-finals of the tournament, where they were eventually defeated by England.

On 17 November 2025, he captained the national team for the 72nd time in a 4–0 victory over Lithuania in their final 2026 World Cup qualifying match, surpassing Frank de Boer's previous record.

On 27 May 2026, Van Dijk was named in the Netherlands' squad for the 2026 FIFA World Cup. On 14 June, Van Dijk headed home the Netherlands' first goal of the tournament in their group opener against Japan which eventually ended 2–2. The Netherlands were eliminated from the tournament by Morocco in the round of 32, losing out 3–2 on penalties following a 1–1 draw after extra-time.

On 4 October 2026, Van Dijk earned his 100th international cap, after captaining the Netherlands in a UEFA Nations League win over Serbia. In doing so, he became only the 11th Dutchman to earn over 100 caps.

== Player profile ==
Van Dijk is a physically strong, right-footed centre-back, who usually features on the left-hand side of central defence, although he can also play as a right-sided centre-back. He is gifted with pace, good technique, and an eye for goal, and is an effective set-piece taker. Regarding his ability, former Celtic teammate Kris Commons commented that Van Dijk was "comfortable on the ball", also noting that "He had good technique and a wonderful right foot. He was good on set-pieces, some of the free-kicks he scored for Celtic are absolute wonders. He could read the game well. He had an aura about him, a confidence, because I think he knew he was good."

Neil McGuinness, senior scout at Celtic when Van Dijk was signed, called him "everything you would want if you could create a profile of the ideal central defender", praising him as a "very smooth ball-playing defender" who possesses aerial prowess, skills from dead ball situations, and "strong leadership qualities", while commenting that since his move to England, he is "more tactically aware now [...] his anticipation and timing has improved and he is a lot more of an all-rounder". McGuinness believes Van Dijk's "biggest problem" is that he "can switch off when the game is comfortable". In 2018, Steve Douglas of The Globe and Mail described Van Dijk with the following words: "Powerful in the air, measured with the ball at his feet, quick, and with superb positional sense, van Dijk [sic] has it all." Dario Pergolizzi also described Van Dijk as a good marker in 2019.

In a 2019 interview with Marca, when Lionel Messi was asked why Van Dijk was so difficult to beat, the Argentine responded: "He is a defender who knows how to judge his timing and wait for the right moment to challenge or jockey [the attacker]. He is very fast and big, but he has a lot of agility for his height. He is fast because of its [sic] great stride, and he is impressive both in defence and attack because he scores lots of goals."

That same year, Paul Merson described Van Dijk as "the best in the world, and I think by a long way, as a defensive centre-half." In 2020, Vincent Kompany called Van Dijk the best centre-back to ever appear in the Premier League, claiming the Liverpool "before Van Dijk and the other after him, it's a completely different setup". In 2022, Erling Haaland named Van Dijk the best defender he has played against, calling him "fast, strong and 'bad' smart", as well as praising his timing. In 2023, Ben Foster claimed that Van Dijk was the "best defender that has ever lived" during his pre-injury run with Liverpool.

In 2024, Van Dijk revealed that while his childhood favourite team used to be Barcelona, his biggest inspiration as a defender was AC Milan's centre back Alessandro Nesta. He had also named Ronaldinho as his favourite player of all time, who in turn called Van Dijk a fantastic player, highlighting his elegance on the ball and mastery while in command of the defence.

== Sponsorship ==
Van Dijk features as the cover star of the champions edition of EA Sports' FIFA video game FIFA 20. He is endorsed by sportswear company Nike.

== Personal life ==
"Nobody really knows the reason. What exactly happened is private and I won't tell the media. It's nobody's business. But my father is no longer in my life."

— Dutch International, Virgil van Dijk, on his name, in 2018.

Van Dijk commonly uses only his first name on the back of his jersey. According to his uncle Steven, this is because of a family feud with his father, who abandoned his family during Van Dijk's childhood.

Van Dijk met his wife Rike Nooitgedagt in 2011 when he was 20 and they have been married since the summer of 2017. The couple's first child was born 2014, they now have four children.

In September 2025, a stand at Sportpark Prinsenhoeve, the home ground of the youth team of Van Dijk's former club Willem II, was renamed the Virgil van Dijk Tribune in his honour. The club described it as "a sign of appreciation for the career of the former Willem II youth player, who grew into one of the best defenders in the world", as well as a gesture "to permanently inspire new generations of youth players."

== Career statistics ==
=== Club ===
As of match played 22 November 2026

Appearances and goals by club, season and competition
Club	Season	League			National cup (Note: Includes KNVB Cup, Scottish Cup, FA Cup)		League cup (Note: Includes Scottish League Cup, Football League/EFL Cup)		Europe		Other		Total	
Club	Season	Division	Apps	Goals	Apps	Goals	Apps	Goals	Apps	Goals	Apps	Goals	Apps	Goals
Groningen	2010–11	Eredivisie	5	2	0	0	—		—		—		5	2
Groningen	2011–12	Eredivisie	23	3	1	0	—		—		—		24	3
Groningen	2012–13	Eredivisie	34	2	3	0	—		—		—		37	2
Groningen	Total		62	7	4	0	—		—		—		66	7
Celtic	2013–14	Scottish Premiership	36	5	2	0	1	0	8 (Note: Appearances in UEFA Champions League)	0	—		47	5
Celtic	2014–15	Scottish Premiership	35	4	5	4	4	0	14 (Note: Six appearances and two goals in UEFA Champions League, eight appearances in UEFA Europa League)	2	—		58	10
Celtic	2015–16	Scottish Premiership	5	0	—		—		5	0	—		10	0
Celtic	Total		76	9	7	4	5	0	27	2	—		115	15
Southampton	2015–16	Premier League	34	3	1	0	3	0	—		—		38	3
Southampton	2016–17	Premier League	21	1	1	1	2	0	6 (Note: Appearances in UEFA Europa League)	2	—		30	4
Southampton	2017–18	Premier League	12	0	—		0	0	—		—		12	0
Southampton	Total		67	4	2	1	5	0	6	2	—		80	7
Liverpool	2017–18	Premier League	14	0	2	1	—		6	0	—		22	1
Liverpool	2018–19	Premier League	38	4	0	0	0	0	12	2	—		50	6
Liverpool	2019–20	Premier League	38	5	1	0	0	0	8	0	3 (Note: One appearance in FA Community Shield, one appearance in UEFA Super Cup, one appearance in FIFA Club World Cup)	0	50	5
Liverpool	2020–21	Premier League	5	1	0	0	2	0	0	0	1 (Note: Appearance in FA Community Shield)	0	8	1
Liverpool	2021–22	Premier League	34	3	5	0	3	0	9	0	—		51	3
Liverpool	2022–23	Premier League	32	3	0	0	0	0	8	0	1	0	41	3
Liverpool	2023–24	Premier League	36	2	3	1	4	1	5	0	—		48	4
Liverpool	2024–25	Premier League	37	3	0	0	3	1	9	1	—		49	5
Liverpool	2025–26	Premier League	38	6	4	0	0	0	12	2	1	0	55	8
Liverpool	2026–27	Premier League	11	0	0	0	1	0	4	0	—		16	0
Liverpool	Total		283	27	15	2	13	2	74	5	6	0	390	36
Career total			488	47	28	7	23	2	107	9	6	0	651	65

=== International ===
As of match played 4 October 2026

Appearances and goals by national team and year
National team	Year	Apps	Goals
Netherlands	2015	3	0
Netherlands	2016	9	0
Netherlands	2017	4	0
Netherlands	2018	8	3
Netherlands	2019	9	1
Netherlands	2020	5	0
Netherlands	2021	6	1
Netherlands	2022	10	1
Netherlands	2023	10	1
Netherlands	2024	14	2
Netherlands	2025	10	2
Netherlands	2026	12	3
Total		100	14

As of match played 4 October 2026
Netherlands score listed first, score column indicates score after each Van Dijk goal.

List of international goals scored by Virgil van Dijk
No.	Date	Venue	Cap	Opponent	Score	Result	Competition	Ref.
1	26 March 2018	Stade de Genève, Geneva, Switzerland	18	Portugal	3–0	3–0	Friendly	
2	13 October 2018	Johan Cruyff Arena, Amsterdam, Netherlands	22	Germany	1–0	3–0	2018–19 UEFA Nations League A	
3	19 November 2018	Arena AufSchalke, Gelsenkirchen, Germany	24	Germany	2–2	2–2	2018–19 UEFA Nations League A	
4	21 March 2019	De Kuip, Rotterdam, Netherlands	25	Belarus	4–0	4–0	UEFA Euro 2020 qualifying	
5	11 October 2021	De Kuip, Rotterdam, Netherlands	42	Gibraltar	1–0	6–0	2022 FIFA World Cup qualification	
6	25 September 2022	Johan Cruyff Arena, Amsterdam, Netherlands	49	Belgium	1–0	1–0	2022–23 UEFA Nations League A	
7	16 October 2023	Agia Sophia Stadium, Athens, Greece	62	Greece	1–0	1–0	UEFA Euro 2024 qualifying	
8	6 June 2024	De Kuip, Rotterdam, Netherlands	67	Canada	4–0	4–0	Friendly	
9	10 June 2024	De Kuip, Rotterdam, Netherlands	68	Iceland	2–0	4–0	Friendly	
10	10 June 2025	Euroborg, Groningen, Netherlands	82	Malta	3–0	8–0	2026 FIFA World Cup qualification	
11	12 October 2025	Johan Cruyff Arena, Amsterdam, Netherlands	86	Finland	2–0	4–0	2026 FIFA World Cup qualification	
12	27 March 2026	Johan Cruyff Arena, Amsterdam, Netherlands	89	Norway	1–1	2–1	Friendly	
13	14 June 2026	AT&T Stadium, Arlington, United States	93	Japan	1–0	2–2	2026 FIFA World Cup	
14	1 October 2026	Toumba Stadium, Thessaloniki, Greece	99	Greece	1–2	2–2	2026–27 UEFA Nations League A	

== Honours ==
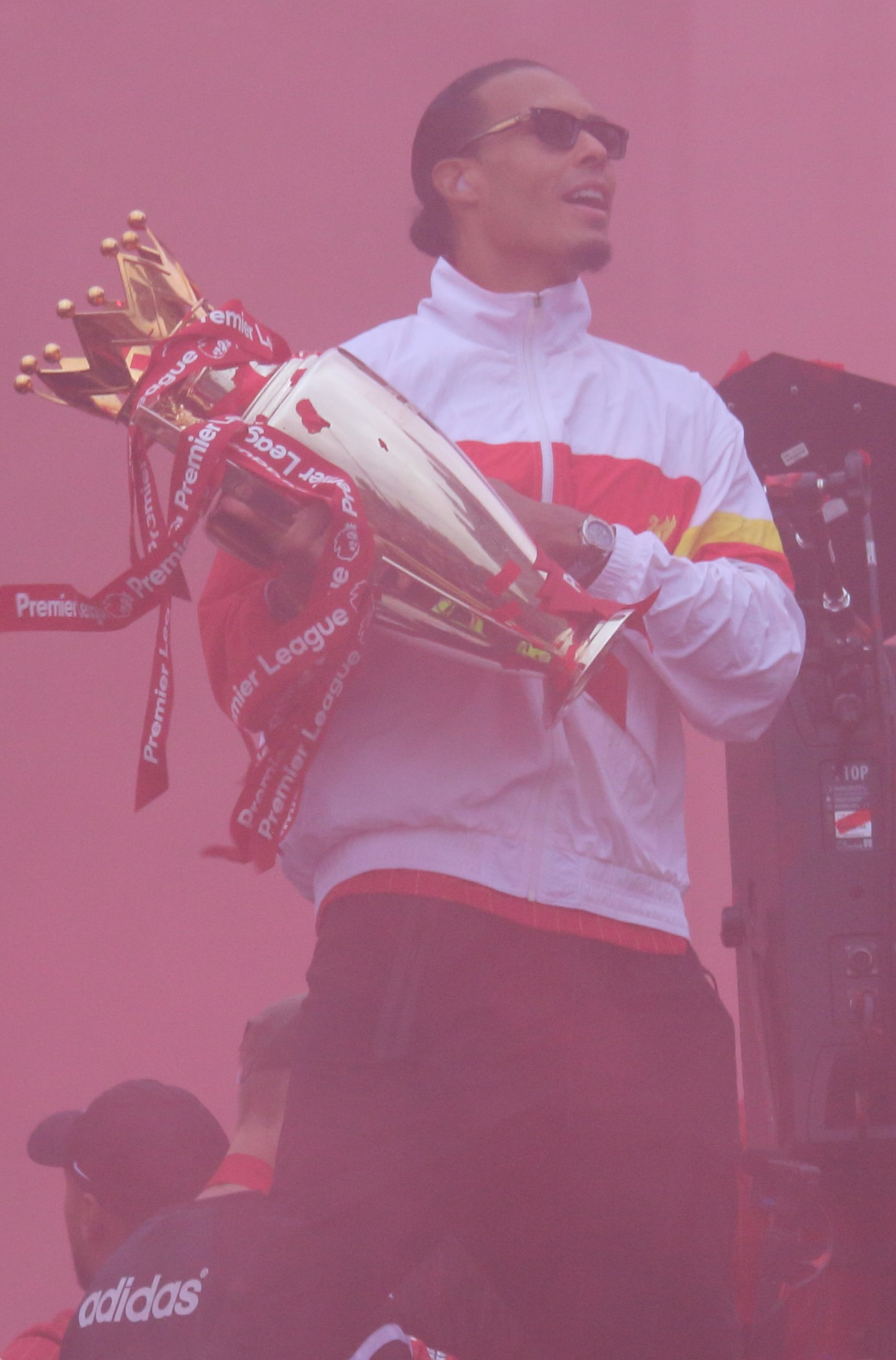
Van Dijk with the Premier League trophy at Liverpool's title-winning parade in 2025

Celtic

- Scottish Premiership: 2013–14, 2014–15
- Scottish League Cup: 2014–15

Liverpool

- Premier League: 2019–20, 2024–25
- FA Cup: 2021–22
- EFL Cup: 2021–22, 2023–24; runner-up: 2024–25
- FA Community Shield: 2022
- UEFA Champions League: 2018–19; runner-up: 2017–18, 2021–22
- UEFA Super Cup: 2019
- FIFA Club World Cup: 2019

Individual

- PFA Players' Player of the Year: 2018–19
- PFA Team of the Year: 2018–19 Premier League, 2019–20 Premier League, 2021–22 Premier League, 2023–24 Premier League, 2024–25 Premier League
- Premier League Player of the Season: 2018–19
- Premier League Player of the Year by Northwest Football Awards: 2019
- Alan Hardaker Trophy: 2022 2024
- UEFA Men's Player of the Year Award: 2018–19
- UEFA Champions League Defender of the Season: 2018–19
- Ballon D'or: runner-up: 2019
- UEFA Team of the Year: 2018, 2019, 2020
- UEFA Champions League Squad of the Season: 2017–18, 2018–19, 2019–20
- UEFA Champions League Team of the Season: 2021–22
- UEFA Nations League Finals Team of the Tournament: 2019
- Liverpool Fans' Player of the Season Award: 2018–19
- Liverpool Players' Player of the Season Award: 2018–19
- Southampton Player of the Season: 2015–16
- PFA Scotland Team of the Year: 2013–14, 2014–15
- Celtic Players' Player of the Year: 2013–14
- FIFPRO World 11: 2019, 2020, 2022, 2024, 2025
- FIFA Men's World 11: 2025
- IFFHS Men's World Team: 2019, 2020, 2022
- Sports Illustrated Premier League Team of the Decade: 2010–2019
- IFFHS World Team of the Decade: 2011–2020
- IFFHS UEFA Team of the Decade: 2011–2020
- ESM Team of the Year: 2018–19, 2019–20, 2021–22, 2023–24
- Football Supporters' Federation Player of the Year: 2019
- The Athletic European Men's Team of the Season: 2024–25
- The Athletic Premier League Team of the Season: 2024–25
- Premier League Fan Team of the Season: 2024–25
- 2026 FIFA World Cup Superior Player of the Match award: (Netherlands x Japan)

== See also ==
- List of men's footballers with 100 or more international caps
