= 2019 UEFA Nations League final =

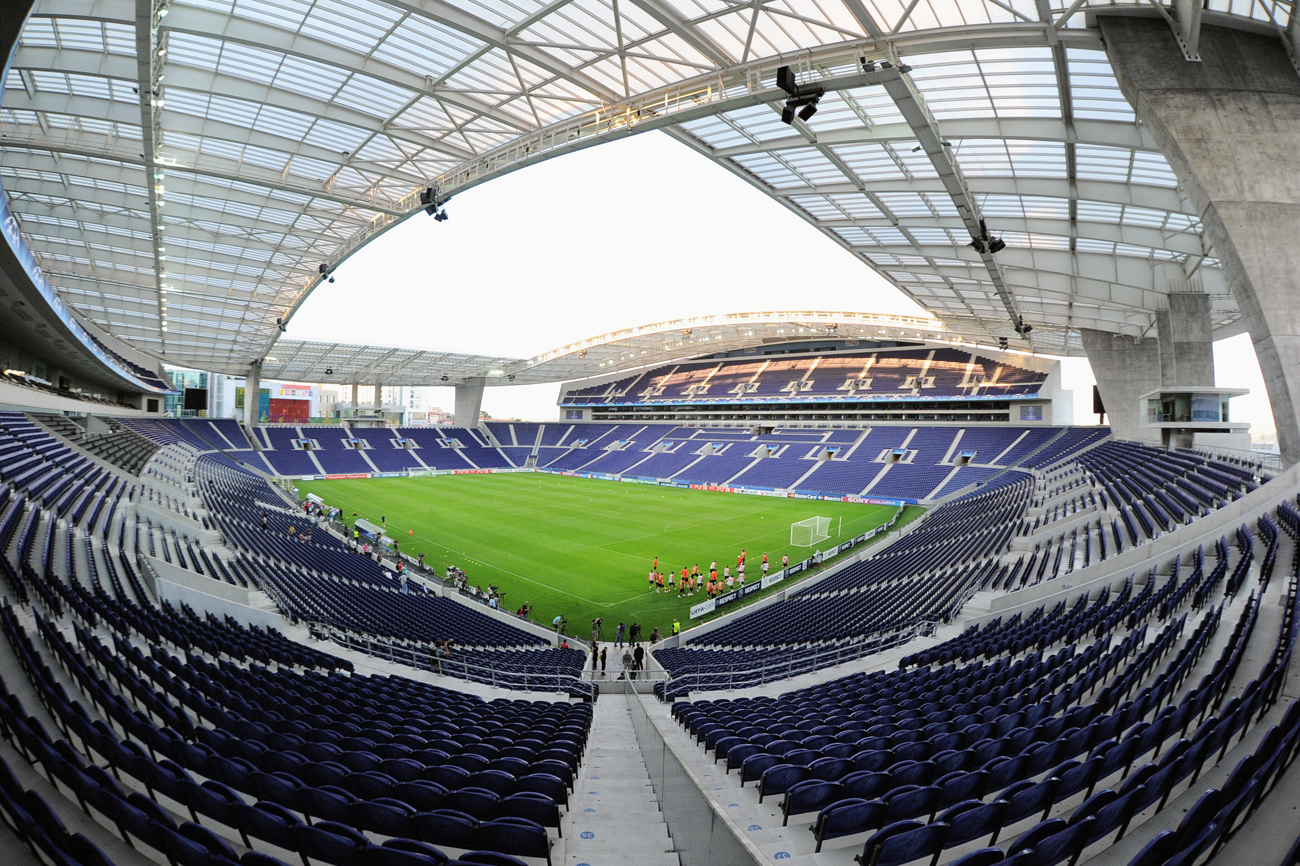
- The Estádio do Dragão in Porto hosted the final.
- Event: 2019 UEFA Nations League Finals
Portugal	Netherlands
1	0
- Date: 9 June 2019
- Venue: Estádio do Dragão, Porto
- Man of the Match: Rúben Dias (Portugal)
- Referee: Alberto Undiano Mallenco (Spain)
- Attendance: 43,199
- Weather: Partly cloudy 16 °C (61 °F); 56% humidity

The 2019 UEFA Nations League final was a football match that determined the winners of the final tournament of the 2018–19 UEFA Nations League. It was the inaugural final of the international football competition involving the men's national teams of the member associations of UEFA. The match was held on 9 June 2019 at the Estádio do Dragão in Porto, Portugal, and was contested by hosts Portugal and the Netherlands.

Portugal won the final 1–0 to become the first champions of the UEFA Nations League.

== Venue ==
The final was played at the Estádio do Dragão in Porto—Portugal's second largest city.

The stadium is home to FC Porto.

== Background ==
Ahead of the inaugural final, hosts Portugal held a World Ranking of 7, while opponents the Netherlands were ranked sixteenth.

En route to the Nations League final, the Netherlands beat world champions France—who had won their world title approximately four months prior to their match.

Portugal and the Netherlands beat Switzerland and England respectively in their semi-finals.

== Route to the final ==
Note: In all results below, the score of the finalist is given first (H: home; A: away).

Portugal
Round
Netherlands
Opponents
Result
League phase
Opponents
Result
Italy
1–0 (H)
Match 1
France
1–2 (A)
Poland
3–2 (A)
Match 2
Germany
3–0 (H)
Italy
0–0 (A)
Match 3
France
2–0 (H)
Poland
1–1 (H)
Match 4
Germany
2–2 (A)
Group A3 winner

Pos	Team	Pld	Pts
1	Portugal	4	8
2	Italy	4	5
3	Poland	4	2

Source: UEFA
Final standings
Group A1 winner

Pos	Team	Pld	Pts
1	Netherlands	4	7
2	France	4	7
3	Germany	4	2

Source: UEFA
Opponents
Result
Nations League Finals
Opponents
Result
Switzerland
3–1
Semi-finals
England
3–1 (a.e.t.)

== Pre-match ==
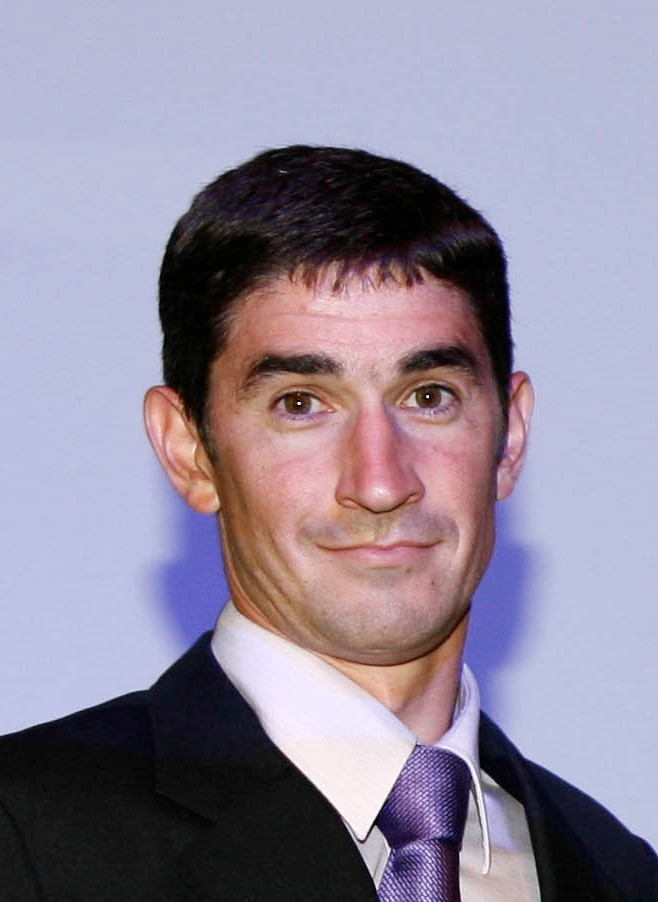
Referee Alberto Undiano Mallenco retired from refereeing after this match.

=== Officials ===
On 7 June 2019, UEFA announced the appointment of Spaniard Alberto Undiano Mallenco as referee for the final, in what would be his final match as a professional referee. He was joined by compatriots Roberto Alonso Fernández and Juan Yuste Jiménez as assistant referees, Antonio Mateu Lahoz as the fourth official, and Raúl Cabañero Martínez as the reserve official. Alejandro Hernández Hernández served as the video assistant referee and Juan Martínez Munuera as the assistant video assistant referee.

== Match ==
=== Details ===
9 June 2019
19:45 UTC+1

Portugal	1–0	Netherlands
Guedes 60'	Report

Estádio do Dragão, Porto
Attendance: 43,199
Referee: Alberto Undiano Mallenco (Spain)

Portugal	Netherlands

GK	1	Rui Patrício
RB	20	Nélson Semedo
CB	4	Rúben Dias
CB	6	José Fonte
LB	5	Raphaël Guerreiro
CM	13	Danilo Pereira
CM	14	William Carvalho	(substituted off) 90+3'
CM	16	Bruno Fernandes	(substituted off) 81'
RW	7	Cristiano Ronaldo (c)
CF	17	Gonçalo Guedes	(substituted off) 75'
LW	10	Bernardo Silva
Substitutions:
MF	15	Rafa Silva	(substituted on) 75'
MF	8	João Moutinho	(substituted on) 81'
MF	18	Rúben Neves	(substituted on) 90+3'
Manager:
Fernando Santos

GK	1	Jasper Cillessen
RB	22	Denzel Dumfries	(yellow card) 88'
CB	3	Matthijs de Ligt
CB	4	Virgil van Dijk (c)	(yellow card) 90+1'
LB	17	Daley Blind
CM	15	Marten de Roon		(substituted off) 81'
CM	21	Frenkie de Jong
CM	8	Georginio Wijnaldum
RW	7	Steven Bergwijn		(substituted off) 60'
CF	10	Memphis Depay
LW	9	Ryan Babel		(substituted off) 46'
Substitutions:
FW	11	Quincy Promes		(substituted on) 46'
MF	20	Donny van de Beek		(substituted on) 60'
FW	19	Luuk de Jong		(substituted on) 81'
Manager:
Ronald Koeman

Man of the Match:
Rúben Dias (Portugal)

Assistant referees:
Roberto Alonso Fernández (Spain)
Juan Yuste Jiménez (Spain)
Fourth official:
Antonio Mateu Lahoz (Spain)
Reserve assistant referee:
Raúl Cabañero Martínez (Spain)
Video assistant referee:
Alejandro Hernández Hernández (Spain)
Assistant video assistant referee:
Juan Martínez Munuera (Spain)

Match rules

- 90 minutes.
- 30 minutes of extra time if necessary.
- Penalty shoot-out if scores still level.
- Maximum of twelve named substitutes.
- Maximum of three substitutions, with a fourth allowed in extra time.

=== Statistics ===
First half
Statistic	Portugal	Netherlands
Goals scored	0	0
Total shots	12	1
Shots on target	4	0
Saves	0	4
Ball possession	41%	59%
Corner kicks	6	1
Fouls committed	4	6
Offsides	1	0
Yellow cards	0	0
Red cards	0	0

Second half
Statistic	Portugal	Netherlands
Goals scored	1	0
Total shots	7	4
Shots on target	3	1
Saves	3	2
Ball possession	50%	50%
Corner kicks	4	3
Fouls committed	2	7
Offsides	1	2
Yellow cards	0	2
Red cards	0	0

Overall
Statistic	Portugal	Netherlands
Goals scored	1	0
Total shots	19	5
Shots on target	7	1
Saves	3	6
Ball possession	45%	55%
Corner kicks	10	4
Fouls committed	6	13
Offsides	2	2
Yellow cards	0	2
Red cards	0	0
