= IFFHS World's Best National Coach =

Award for association football coaches

IFFHS World's Best Man National Coach
- Sport: Association football
- Awarded for: Best performing man national coach of the calendar year
- Presented by: International Federation of Football History & Statistics

History
- First award: 1996
- Editions: 30
- First winner: (Germany) Berti Vogts
- Most wins: (Spain) Vicente del Bosque (4 awards)
- Most recent: (Spain) Luis de la Fuente (2nd award)
- Website: iffhs.com/en

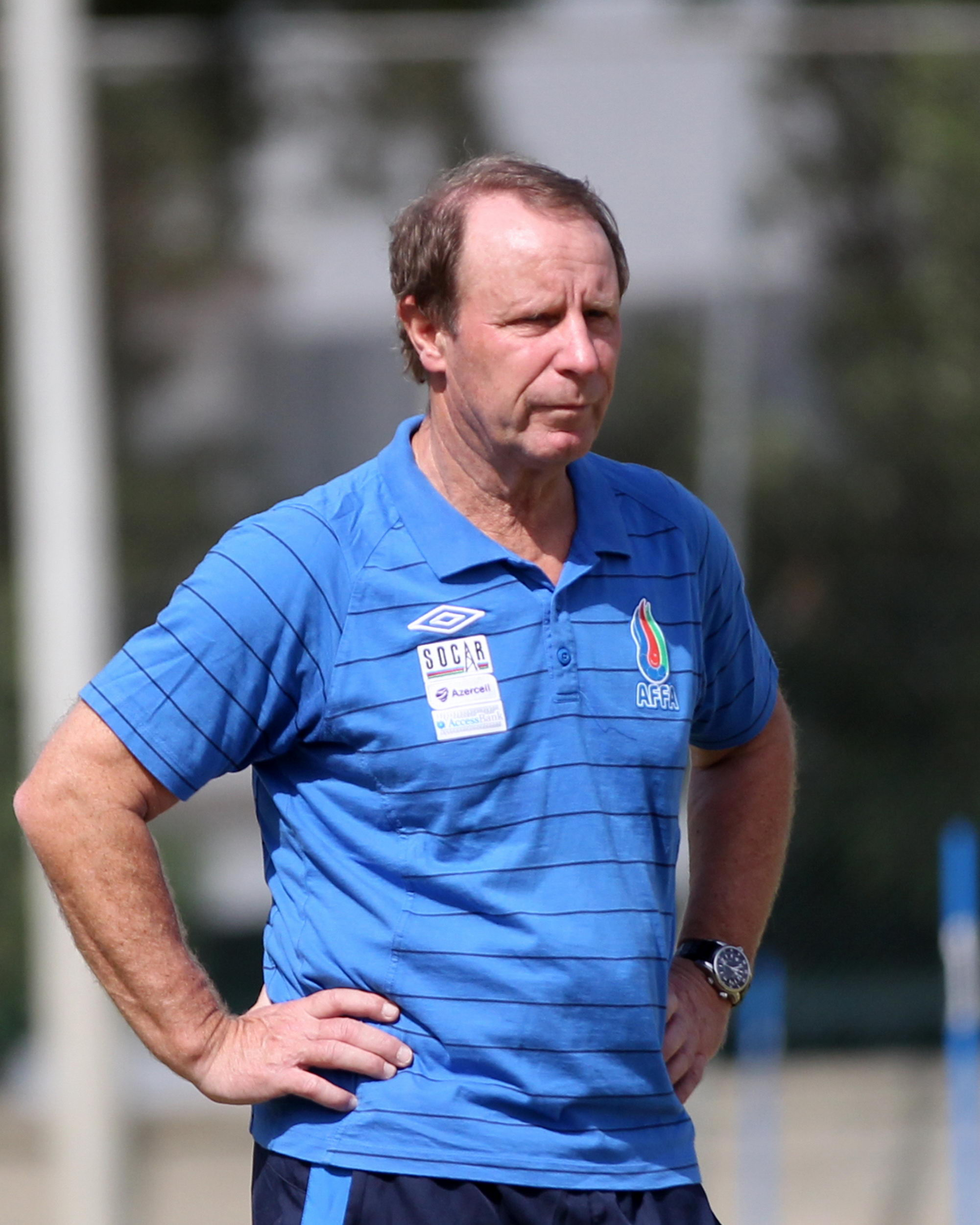
Berti Vogts was the recipient of the first edition of the award in 1996.

The IFFHS World's Best National Coach is an association football award given annually, since 1996, to the most outstanding national team coach as voted by the International Federation of Football History & Statistics (IFFHS). The votes, in 1996, were cast by IFFHS's editorial staff as well as experts from 89 countries spanning six different continents. Since then, the votes are now awarded by 81 experts and selected editorial offices from all the continents. In 2020, an award for women's national team coaches was introduced. The current men's recipient is Argentina coach Lionel Scaloni. The current women's recipient is the England manager Sarina Wiegman.

== Men's winners ==
Below is a list of the previous men's winners and runners-up since the first award in 1996.

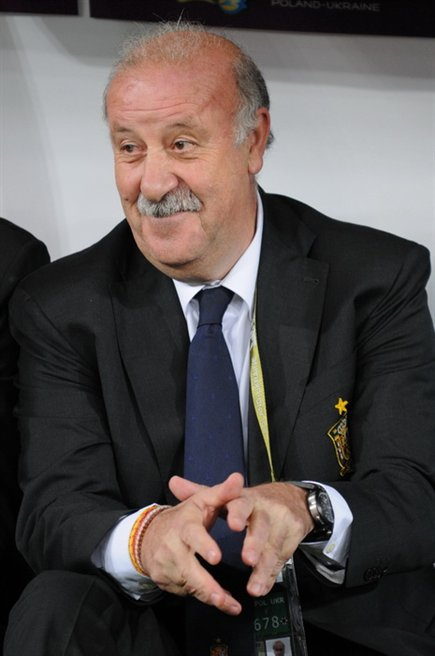
Vicente del Bosque is a record four-time winner of the award.

=== List of winners ===
Year	Rank	Winner	National team	Point
1996	**1st**	**(Germany) Berti Vogts**	**Germany**	–
1996	2nd	(Serbia) Velibor Milutinović	Mexico	–
1996	3rd	(Netherlands) Jo Bonfrère	Nigeria	–
1997	**1st**	**(Brazil) Mário Zagallo**	**Brazil**	**194**
1997	2nd	(Spain) Javier Clemente	Spain	112
1997	3rd	(England) Glenn Hoddle	England	110
1998	**1st**	**(France) Aimé Jacquet**	**France**	**259**
1998	2nd	(Croatia) Miroslav Blažević	Croatia	148
1998	3rd	(Netherlands) Guus Hiddink	Netherlands	109
1999	**1st**	**(Brazil) Wanderley Luxemburgo**	**Brazil**	**147**
1999	2nd	(Czech Republic) Jozef Chovanec	Czech Republic	140
1999	3rd	(Spain) José Antonio Camacho	Spain	123
2000	**1st**	**(France) Roger Lemerre**	**France**	**271**
2000	2nd	(Portugal) Humberto Coelho	Portugal	102
2000	3rd	(Argentina) Marcelo Bielsa	Argentina	91
2001	**1st**	**(Argentina) Marcelo Bielsa**	**Argentina**	**201**
2001	2nd	(Sweden) Sven-Göran Eriksson	England	147
2001	3rd	(France) Roger Lemerre	France	127
2002	**1st**	**(Brazil) Luiz Felipe Scolari**	**Brazil**	**286**
2002	2nd	(Netherlands) Guus Hiddink	South Korea	179
2002	3rd	(Turkey) Şenol Güneş	Turkey	155
2003	**1st**	**(France) Jacques Santini**	**France**	**150**
2003	2nd	(Czech Republic) Karel Brückner	Czech Republic	133
2003	3rd	(Sweden) Sven-Göran Eriksson	England	74
2004	**1st**	**(Germany) Otto Rehhagel**	**Greece**	**261**
2004	2nd	(Argentina) Marcelo Bielsa	Argentina	134
2004	3rd	(Brazil) Luiz Felipe Scolari	Portugal	98
2005	**1st**	**(Brazil) Carlos Alberto Parreira**	**Brazil**	**167**
2005	2nd	(Netherlands) Marco van Basten	Netherlands	134
2005	3rd	(Argentina) José Pékerman	Argentina	75
2006	**1st**	**(Italy) Marcello Lippi**	**Italy**	**298**
2006	2nd	(France) Raymond Domenech	**France**	132
2006	3rd	(Germany) Jürgen Klinsmann	**Germany**	123
2007	**1st**	**(Brazil) Dunga**	**Brazil**	**148**
2007	2nd	(Croatia) Slaven Bilić	Croatia	101
2007	3rd	**(Brazil)** Jorvan Vieira	Iraq	83
2008	**1st**	**(Spain) Luis Aragonés**	**Spain**	**252**
2008	2nd	(Netherlands) Guus Hiddink	Russia	145
2008	3rd	(Turkey) Fatih Terim	Turkey	72
2009	**1st**	**(Spain) Vicente del Bosque**	**Spain**	**185**
2009	2nd	(Italy) Fabio Capello	England	151
2009	3rd	(Brazil) Dunga	Brazil	149
2010	**1st**	**(Spain) Vicente del Bosque**	**Spain**	**298**
2010	2nd	(Germany) Joachim Löw	Germany	168
2010	3rd	(Netherlands) Bert van Marwijk	Netherlands	125
2011	**1st**	**(Uruguay) Óscar Tabárez**	**Uruguay**	**200**
2011	2nd	(Spain) Vicente del Bosque	Spain	186
2011	3rd	(Germany) Joachim Löw	Germany	169
2012	**1st**	**(Spain) Vicente del Bosque**	**Spain**	**165**
2012	2nd	(Italy) Cesare Prandelli	Italy	101
2012	3rd	(Germany) Joachim Löw	Germany	99
2013	**1st**	**(Spain) Vicente del Bosque**	**Spain**	**161**
2013	2nd	(Germany) Joachim Löw	Germany	101
2013	3rd	(Brazil) Luiz Felipe Scolari	Brazil	74
2014	**1st**	**(Germany) Joachim Löw**	'Germany	**220**
2014	2nd	(Argentina) Alejandro Sabella	Argentina	71
2014	3rd	(Netherlands) Louis van Gaal	Netherlands	38
2015	**1st**	**(Argentina) Jorge Sampaoli**	**Chile**	**136**
2015	2nd	(Germany) Joachim Löw	Germany	57
2015	3rd	(England) Roy Hodgson	England	46
2016	**1st**	**(Portugal) Fernando Santos**	**Portugal**	**199**
2016	2nd	(Sweden) Lars Lagerbäck	Iceland	71
2016	3rd	(Germany) Joachim Löw	Germany	62
2017	**1st**	**(Germany) Joachim Löw**	**Germany**	**299**
2017	2nd	(Brazil) Tite	Brazil	125
2017	3rd	(Spain) Julen Lopetegui	Spain	62
2018	**1st**	**(France) Didier Deschamps**	**France**	**304**
2018	2nd	(Croatia) Zlatko Dalić	Croatia	198
2018	3rd	(Spain) Roberto Martínez	Belgium	84
2019	**1st**	**(Portugal) Fernando Santos**	**Portugal**	**112**
2019	2nd	(Brazil) Tite	Brazil	102
2019	3rd	(Spain) Roberto Martínez	Belgium	97
2020	**1st**	**(France) Didier Deschamps**	**France**	**100**
2020	2nd	(Spain) Roberto Martínez	Belgium	95
2020	3rd	(Spain) Luis Enrique	Spain	60
2021	**1st**	**(Italy) Roberto Mancini**	**Italy**	**225**
2021	2nd	(Argentina) Lionel Scaloni	Argentina	30
2021	3rd	(France) Didier Deschamps	France	25
2022	**1st**	**(Argentina) Lionel Scaloni**	**Argentina**	**240**
2022	2nd	(France) Didier Deschamps	France	45
2022	3rd	(Morocco) Walid Regragui	Morocco	30
2023	**1st**	**(Argentina) Lionel Scaloni**	**Argentina**	**185**
2023	2nd	(France) Didier Deschamps	France	112
2023	3rd	(Spain) Roberto Martínez	Portugal	61
2024	**1st**	**(Spain) Luis de la Fuente**	**Spain**	**274**
2024	2nd	(Argentina) Lionel Scaloni	Argentina	148
2024	3rd	(France) Didier Deschamps	France	35
2025	**1st**	**(Spain) Luis de la Fuente**	**Spain**	**136**
2025	2nd	(Spain) Roberto Martínez	Portugal	83
2025	3rd	(Argentina) Lionel Scaloni	Argentina	59

=== Statistics ===
Winners (1996–present)
Coach	Wins	Years
(Spain) Vicente del Bosque	4	2009, 2010, 2012, 2013
(Germany) Joachim Löw	2	2014, 2017
(Portugal) Fernando Santos	2	2016, 2019
(France) Didier Deschamps	2	2018, 2020
(Argentina) Lionel Scaloni	2	2022, 2023
(Spain) Luis de la Fuente	2	2024, 2025
(Germany) Berti Vogts	1	1996
(Brazil) Mário Zagallo	1	1997
(France) Aimé Jacquet	1	1998
(Brazil) Wanderley Luxemburgo	1	1999
(France) Roger Lemerre	1	2000
(Argentina) Marcelo Bielsa	1	2001
(Brazil) Luiz Felipe Scolari	1	2002
(France) Jacques Santini	1	2003
(Germany) Otto Rehhagel	1	2004
(Brazil) Carlos Alberto Parreira	1	2005
(Italy) Marcello Lippi	1	2006
(Brazil) Dunga	1	2007
(Spain) Luis Aragonés	1	2008
(Uruguay) Óscar Tabárez	1	2011
(Argentina) Jorge Sampaoli	1	2015
(Italy) Roberto Mancini	1	2021

Wins by national team
National team	Total	Coaches
Spain	7	3
Brazil	5	5
France	5	4
Argentina	4	3
Germany	3	2
Italy	2	2
Portugal	2	1
Chile	1	1
Greece	1	1
Uruguay	1	1

Wins by nationality
Nationality	Total	Coaches
Spain	7	3
Brazil	5	5
France	5	4
Germany	4	3
Argentina	3	2
Italy	2	2
Portugal	2	1
Uruguay	1	1

=== Continental winners ===
Bold indicates the World's Best Man National Coach winner.

Year	Confederation	Winner	National team
2021	**UEFA**	**(Italy) Roberto Mancini**	**Italy**
2021	CONMEBOL	(Argentina) Lionel Scaloni	Argentina
2021	CONCACAF	(United States) Greg Berhalter	United States
2021	CAF	**(Algeria)** Djamel Belmadi	Algeria
2021	AFC	(France) Hervé Renard	Saudi Arabia
2021	OFC	(New Zealand) Danny Hay	New Zealand

=== All-time World's Best Man Coach ranking (1996–2020) ===
As of 25 February 2021

Top 10 coaches
Rank	Coach	Nationality	Points
**1**	**Alex Ferguson**	**Scotland**	**257**
2	José Mourinho	Portugal	226
3	Pep Guardiola	Spain	211
4	Joachim Löw	Germany	200
5	Arsene Wenger	France	183
6	Vicente del Bosque	Spain	175
7	Carlo Ancelotti	Italy	169
8	Marcello Lippi	Italy	156
9	Diego Simeone	Argentina	152
10	Luiz Felipe Scolari	Brazil	151

=== The World's Best Man Coach of the Decade (2001–2010) ===
Top 10 coaches
Rank	Coach	Nationality	Points
**1**	**Arsène Wenger**	**France**	**156**
2	Alex Ferguson	Scotland	148
3	José Mourinho	Portugal	135
4	Fabio Capello	Italy	120
5	Guus Hiddink	Netherlands	112
6	Carlo Ancelotti	Italy	108
7	Luiz Felipe Scolari	Brazil	101
8	Marcelo Bielsa	Argentina	101
9	Rafael Benítez	Spain	97
10	Marcello Lippi	Italy	88

=== The World's Best Man National Coach of the Decade (2011–2020) ===
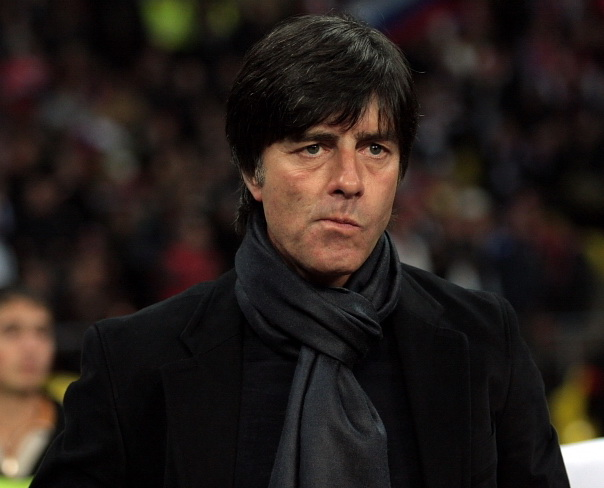
Joachim Löw was selected as the World's Best National Coach of the decade 2011–2020

In 2021, the IFFHS awarded an additional award to coaches by combining the points awarded in the annual World's Best National Coach awards, to the coach who had gained the most points collectively over the previous ten years to determine the best coach of the previous decade. This World's Best National Coach of the Decade award was awarded to Germany manager Joachim Löw who finished ahead of France manager Didier Deschamps.

Top 10 coaches
Rank	Coach	Nationality	Points
**1**	**Joachim Löw**	**Germany**	**155**
2	Didier Deschamps	France	101
3	Tite	Brazil	81
4	Óscar Tabárez	Uruguay	74
5	Fernando Santos	Portugal	74
6	Vicente del Bosque	Spain	72
7	Roberto Martínez	Spain	70
8	José Pékerman	Argentina	55
9	Marc Wilmots	Belgium	43
10	Gareth Southgate	England	43

== Women's winners ==
IFFHS World's Best Woman National Coach
- Sport: Association football
- Awarded for: Best performing woman national coach of the calendar year
- Presented by: International Federation of Football History & Statistics

History
- First award: 2020
- Editions: 6
- First winner: (Netherlands) Sarina Wiegman
- Most wins: (Netherlands) Sarina Wiegman (4 awards)
- Most recent: (Netherlands) Sarina Wiegman (4th award)
- Website: iffhs.com/en

Below is a list of the previous women's winners and runners-up since the first award in 2020.

=== List of winners ===
Year	Rank	Coach	National team	Points
2020	**1st**	(Netherlands) **Sarina Wiegman**	**Netherlands**	**200**
2020	2nd	(North Macedonia) Vlatko Andonovski	United States	65
2020	3rd	(Germany) Martina Voss-Tecklenburg	Germany	25
2021	**1st**	(England) **Bev Priestman**	**Canada**	**135**
2021	2nd	(Sweden) Peter Gerhardsson	Sweden	55
2021	3rd	(Netherlands) Sarina Wiegman	Netherlands	40
2022	**1st**	(Netherlands) **Sarina Wiegman**	**England**	**205**
2022	2nd	(Germany) Martina Voss-Tecklenburg	Germany	40
2022	3rd	(Sweden) Pia Sundhage	Brazil	30
2023	**1st**	(Netherlands) **Sarina Wiegman**	**England**	**156**
2023	2nd	(Spain) Jorge Vilda	Spain	152
2023	3rd	(Sweden) Peter Gerhardsson	Sweden	35
2024	**1st**	(England) **Emma Hayes**	**United States**	**134**
2024	2nd	(Spain) Montse Tomé	Spain	85
2024	3rd	(Netherlands) Sarina Wiegman	England	72
2025	**1st**	(Netherlands) **Sarina Wiegman**	**England**	**166**
2025	2nd	(Brazil) Arthur Elias	Brazil	68
2025	3rd	(Spain) Montse Tomé	Spain	64

=== Statistics ===
Winners (2020–present)
Coach	Wins	Years
(Netherlands) Sarina Wiegman	4	2020, 2022, 2023, 2025
(England) Bev Priestman	1	2021
(England) Emma Hayes	1	2024

Wins by national team
National team	Total	Coaches
England	3	1
Canada	1	1
Netherlands	1	1
United States	1	1

Wins by nationality
Nationality	Total	Coaches
Netherlands	4	1
England	2	2

=== Continental winners ===
Bold indicates the World's Best Woman National Coach winner.

Year	Confederation	Winner	National team
2021	UEFA	(Sweden) Peter Gerhardsson	Sweden
2021	CONMEBOL	(Sweden) Pia Sundhage	Brazil
2021	**CONCACAF**	**(England) Bev Priestman**	**Canada**
2021	CAF	(Zambia) Bruce Mwape	Zambia
2021	AFC	(Japan) Asako Takakura	Japan
2021	OFC	(Czech Republic) Jitka Klimková	New Zealand

== See also ==
- International Federation of Football History & Statistics
- IFFHS World's Best International Goal Scorer
- IFFHS World's Best Top Goal Scorer
- IFFHS World's Best Club Coach
- IFFHS World's Best Goalkeeper
- IFFHS World's Best Player
- IFFHS World's Best Club
- IFFHS World Team
