= IFFHS World's Best Club =

Annual association football award

IFFHS World's Best Man Club
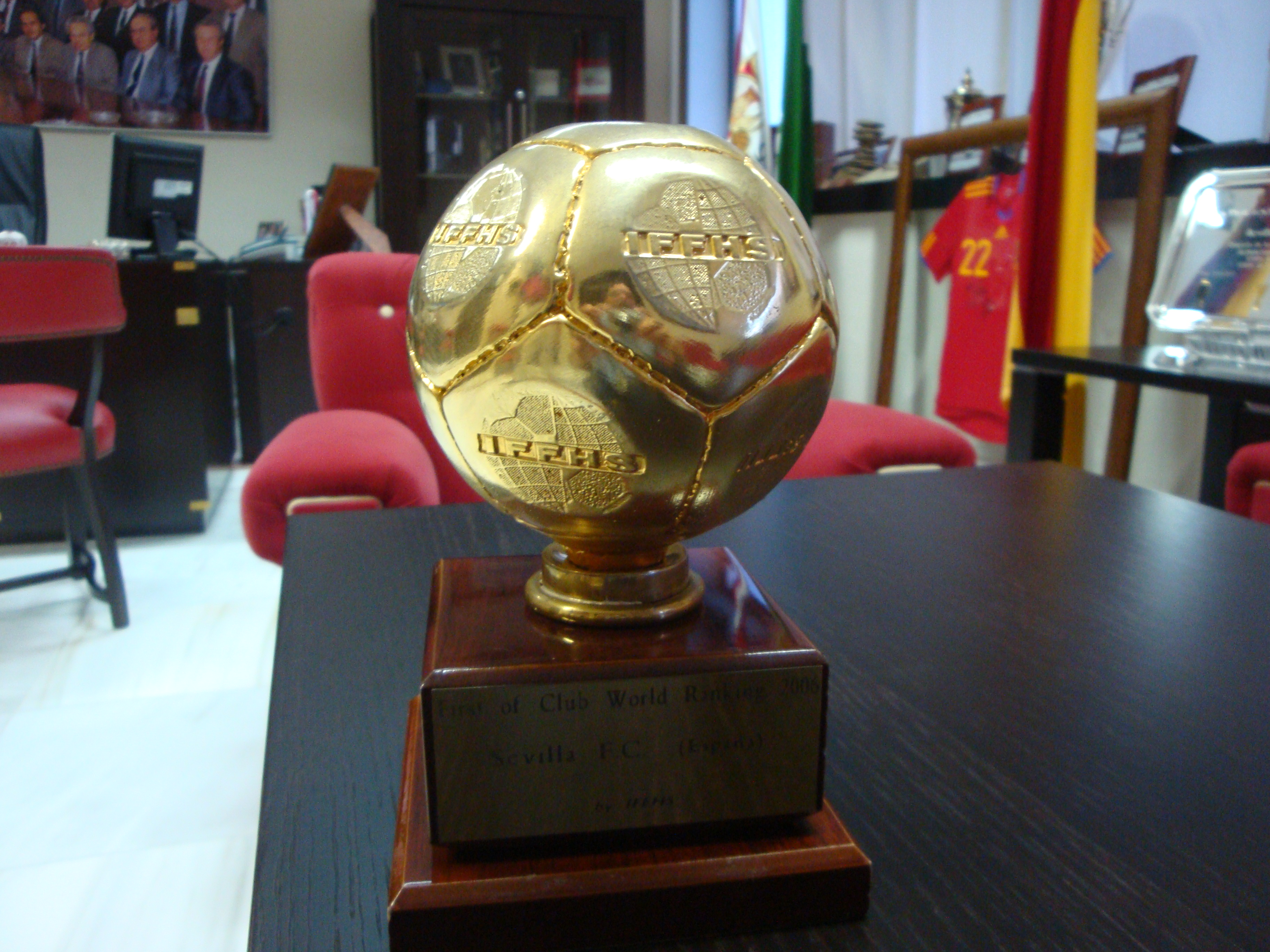
- Sport: Association football
- Competition: Association and confederation tournaments as well as FIFA Club World Cup
- Awarded for: Best performing man club of the calendar year
- Presented by: International Federation of Football History & Statistics

History
- First award: 1991
- Editions: 33
- First winner: (Italy) Roma
- Most wins: (Spain) Barcelona (Spain) Real Madrid (5 awards)
- Most recent: (France) Paris Saint-Germain (2nd award)
- Website: iffhs.com/en

The IFFHS World's Best Club is a football award given annually since 1991 to the world's best club. The award is given by the International Federation of Football History & Statistics (IFFHS), the entity has also produced a monthly Club World Ranking.

The ranking takes into consideration the results of twelve months of continental and intercontinental competitions, national league matches (including play-offs) and the most important national cup (excluding points won before the round of 16).

All countries are rated at four levels based upon the national league performance—clubs in the highest level leagues receive 4 points for each match won, 2 for a draw and 0 for a defeat. Level 2 is assigned 3 pts. (win), 1.5 (draw) and 0 (lost), and so on with the next lower levels.

In continental competitions, all clubs receive the same number of points at all stages regardless of the performance level of their leagues. However, the UEFA Champions League and the Copa Libertadores yield more points than UEFA Europa League and Copa Sudamericana, respectively. The point assignment system is still lower for the AFC, CAF, CONCACAF and OFC continental tournaments. Competitions between two continents are evaluated depending upon their importance. Competitions not organized by a continental confederation, or any intercontinental events not recognized by FIFA, are not taken into consideration.

== Criteria ==
Criteria for national competitions:
Competition	Points for a win	Points for a draw
National Leagues in Level 1	4.0	2.0
National Leagues in Level 2	3.0	1.5
National Leagues in Level 3	2.0	1.0
National Leagues in Level 4	1.0	0.5

Criteria for international competitions:
Competition	Points for a win	Points for a draw
UEFA Champions League	14.0	7.0
UEFA Europa League	12.0	6.0
Copa Libertadores	14.0	7.0
Copa Sudamericana	12.0	6.0
CAF Champions League	9.0	4.5
CAF Cup (defunct)	7.0	3.5
AFC Champions League	9.0	4.5
AFC Cup	7.0	3.5
CONCACAF Champions League	9.0	4.5
OFC Champions League	5.0	2.5
FIFA Club World Cup (semi-finals)	14.0	7.0
FIFA Club World Cup (final)	21.0	10.5

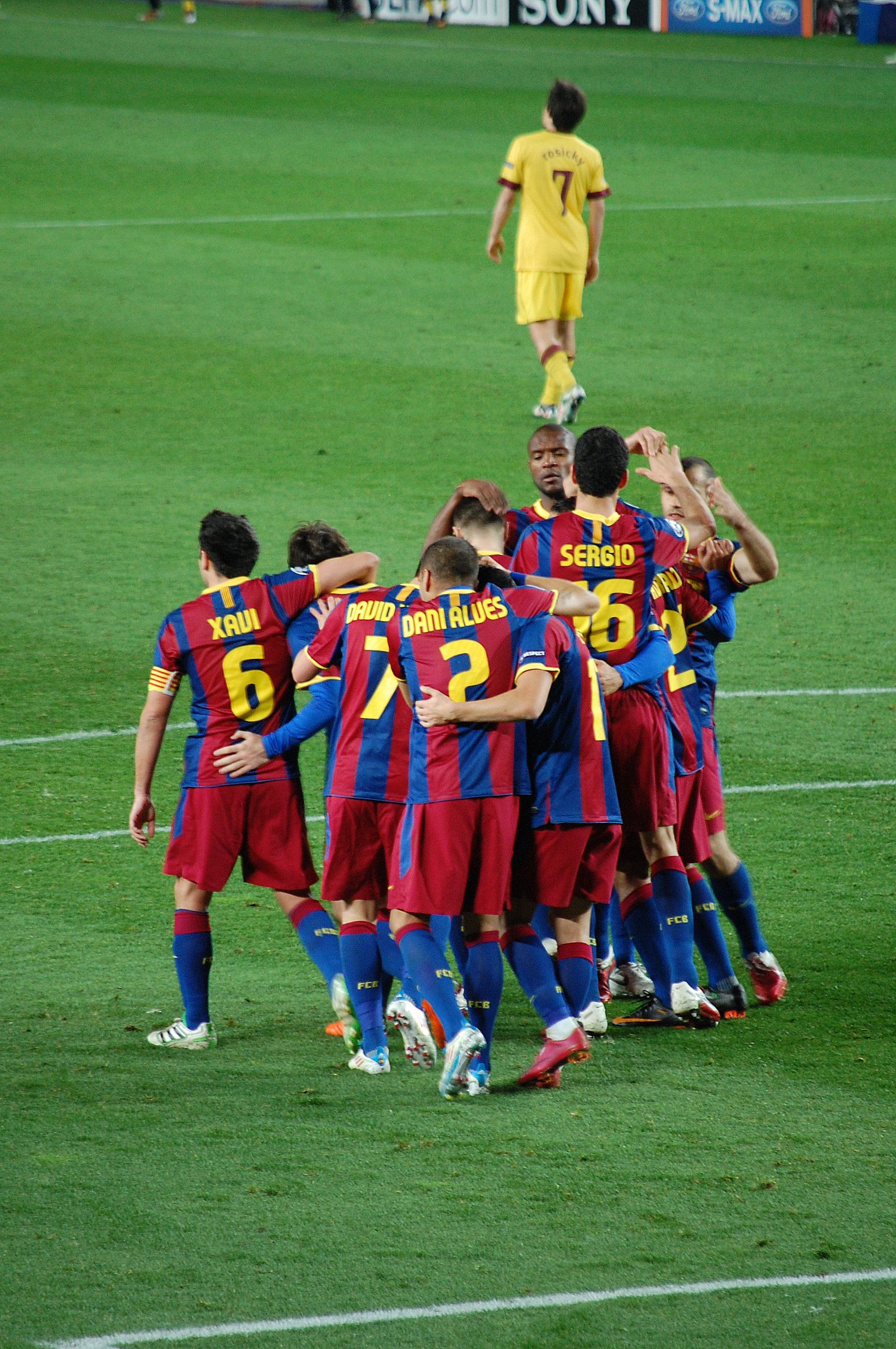
Barcelona

== Men's winners ==
=== List of winners ===
Year	Rank	Club	Points
1991	**1st**	**(Italy) Roma**	**347.5**
1991	2nd	(Socialist Federal Republic of Yugoslavia) Red Star Belgrade	344.5
1991	3rd	(France) Marseille	299.5
1992	**1st**	**(Netherlands) Ajax**	**331**
1992	2nd	(Italy) Milan	330
1992	3rd	(Spain) Real Madrid	323
1993	**1st**	**(Italy) Juventus**	**372.5**
1993	2nd	(Italy) Milan	367.5
1993	3rd	(Spain) Barcelona	319
1994	**1st**	**(France) Paris Saint-Germain**	**334**
1994	2nd	(Italy) Parma	332.5
1994	3rd	(Italy) Milan	310
1995	**1st**	**(Italy) Milan**	**367.5**
1995	2nd	(Italy) Juventus	320
1995	3rd	(Netherlands) Ajax	300
1996	**1st**	**(Italy) Juventus**	**335**
1996	2nd	(Colombia) América de Cali	261.5
1996	3rd	(Spain) Barcelona	256
1997	**1st**	**(Spain) Barcelona**	**378**
1997	2nd	(Italy) Juventus	310
1997	3rd	(Germany) Borussia Dortmund	308
1998	**1st**	**(Italy) Inter Milan**	**326**
1998	2nd	(Brazil) Vasco da Gama	295.5
1998	3rd	(Germany) Bayern Munich	288
1999	**1st**	**(England) Manchester United**	**361**
1999	2nd	(Brazil) Palmeiras	291
1999	3rd	(Italy) Parma	289
2000	**1st**	**(Spain) Real Madrid**	**327**
2000	2nd	(Turkey) Galatasaray	322
2000	3rd	(Argentina) Boca Juniors	296
2001	**1st**	**(England) Liverpool**	**358**
2001	2nd	(Spain) Barcelona	298
2001	3rd	(Germany) Bayern Munich	292
2002	**1st**	**(Spain) Real Madrid**	**312**
2002	2nd	(England) Manchester United	306
2002	3rd	(England) Arsenal	289
2003	**1st**	**(Italy) Milan**	**295**
2003	2nd	(Spain) Real Madrid	293
2003	3rd	(Brazil) Santos	284
2004	**1st**	**(Spain) Valencia**	**274**
2004	2nd	(Argentina) Boca Juniors	270
2004	3rd	(England) Manchester United	265
2005	**1st**	**(England) Liverpool**	**317**
2005	2nd	(Italy) Inter Milan	307
2005	3rd	(Germany) Bayern Munich	281
2006	**1st**	**(Spain) Sevilla**	**295**
2006	2nd	(Italy) Inter Milan	286
2006	3rd	(Italy) Roma	277
2007	**1st**	**(Spain) Sevilla**	**306**
2007	2nd	(England) Manchester United	281
2007	3rd	(Italy) Milan	280
2008	**1st**	**(England) Manchester United**	**292**
2008	2nd	(Germany) Bayern Munich	272
2008	3rd	(England) Liverpool	267
2009	**1st**	**(Spain) Barcelona**	**341**
2009	2nd	(England) Chelsea	292
2009	3rd	(England) Manchester United	291
2010	**1st**	**(Italy) Inter Milan**	**300**
2010	2nd	(Germany) Bayern Munich	268
2010	3rd	(Spain) Barcelona	266
2011	**1st**	**(Spain) Barcelona**	**367**
2011	2nd	(Spain) Real Madrid	312
2011	3rd	(Argentina) Vélez Sarsfield	271
2012	**1st**	**(Spain) Barcelona**	**307**
2012	2nd	(England) Chelsea	279
2012	3rd	(Argentina) Boca Juniors	278
2013	**1st**	**(Germany) Bayern Munich**	**370**
2013	2nd	(Spain) Real Madrid	290
2013	3rd	(England) Chelsea	273
2014	**1st**	**(Spain) Real Madrid**	**381**
2014	2nd	(Germany) Bayern Munich	276
2014	3rd	(Spain) Atlético Madrid	267
2015	**1st**	**(Spain) Barcelona**	**379**
2015	2nd	(Italy) Juventus	286
2015	3rd	(Italy) Napoli	268
2016	**1st**	**(Colombia) Atlético Nacional**	**383**
2016	2nd	(Spain) Real Madrid	310
2016	3rd	(Spain) Barcelona	280
2017	**1st**	**(Spain) Real Madrid**	**328**
2017	2nd	(Brazil) Grêmio	286
2017	3rd	(England) Manchester United	284
2018	**1st**	**(Spain) Atlético Madrid**	**289**
2018	2nd	(Spain) Real Madrid	284
2018	3rd	(Austria) Red Bull Salzburg	278
2019	**1st**	**(England) Liverpool**	**316**
2019	2nd	(Spain) Barcelona	293
2019	3rd	(England) Manchester City	284
2020	**1st**	**(Germany) Bayern Munich**	**260**
2020	2nd	(Brazil) Palmeiras	230
2020	3rd	(France) Paris Saint-Germain	226
2021	**1st**	**(Brazil) Palmeiras**	**322**
2021	2nd	(Brazil) Atlético Mineiro	313
2021	3rd	(England) Manchester City	300
2022	**1st**	**(Brazil) Flamengo**	**299**
2022	2nd	(Brazil) Palmeiras	284
2022	3rd	(England) Liverpool	273
2023	**1st**	**(England) Manchester City**	**359**
2023	2nd	(Spain) Real Madrid	332
2023	3rd	(Italy) Inter Milan	289
2024	**1st**	**(Spain) Real Madrid**	**441**
2024	2nd	(Germany) Bayer Leverkusen	384
2024	3rd	(Italy) Atalanta	380
2025	**1st**	**(France) Paris Saint-Germain**	**613**
2025	2nd	(Spain) Real Madrid	471
2025	3rd	(England) Chelsea	447

=== Statistics ===
Winners (1991–present)
Club	Wins	Runners up	Third place
(Spain) Real Madrid	5 (2000, 2002, 2014, 2017, 2024)	7 (2003, 2011, 2013, 2016, 2018, 2023, 2025)	1 (1992)
(Spain) Barcelona	5 (1997, 2009, 2011, 2012, 2015)	2 (2001, 2019)	4 (1993, 1996, 2010, 2016)
(England) Liverpool	3 (2001, 2005, 2019)	0	2 (2008, 2022)
(Germany) Bayern Munich	2 (2013, 2020)	3 (2008, 2010, 2014)	3 (1998, 2001, 2005)
(Italy) Juventus	2 (1993, 1996)	3 (1995, 1997, 2015)	0
(England) Manchester United	2 (1999, 2008)	2 (2002, 2007)	3 (2004, 2009, 2017)
(Italy) Milan	2 (1995, 2003)	2 (1992, 1993)	2 (1994, 2007)
(Italy) Inter Milan	2 (1998, 2010)	2 (2005, 2006)	1 (2023)
(France) Paris Saint-Germain	2 (1994, 2025)	0	1 (2020)
(Spain) Sevilla	2 (2006, 2007)	0	0
(Brazil) Palmeiras	1 (2021)	3 (1999, 2020, 2022)	0
(England) Manchester City	1 (2023)	0	2 (2019, 2021)
(Italy) Roma	1 (1991)	0	1 (2006)
(Netherlands) Ajax	1 (1992)	0	1 (1995)
(Spain) Atlético Madrid	1 (2018)	0	1 (2014)
(Spain) Valencia	1 (2004)	0	0
(Colombia) Atlético Nacional	1 (2016)	0	0
(Brazil) Flamengo	1 (2022)	0	0
(England) Chelsea	0	2 (2009, 2012)	2 (2013, 2025)
(Argentina) Boca Juniors	0	1 (2004)	2 (2000, 2012)
(Italy) Parma	0	1 (1994)	1 (1999)
(Socialist Federal Republic of Yugoslavia) Red Star Belgrade	0	1 (1991)	0
(Colombia) América de Cali	0	1 (1996)	0
(Brazil) Vasco da Gama	0	1 (1998)	0
(Turkey) Galatasaray	0	1 (2000)	0
(Brazil) Grêmio	0	1 (2017)	0
(Brazil) Atlético Mineiro	0	1 (2021)	0
(Germany) Bayer Leverkusen	0	1 (2024)	0
(France) Marseille	0	0	1 (1991)
(Germany) Borussia Dortmund	0	0	1 (1997)
(England) Arsenal	0	0	1 (2002)
(Brazil) Santos	0	0	1 (2003)
(Argentina) Vélez Sarsfield	0	0	1 (2011)
(Italy) Napoli	0	0	1 (2015)
(Austria) Red Bull Salzburg	0	0	1 (2018)
(Italy) Atalanta	0	0	1 (2024)

Wins by country
Country	Total	Clubs
Spain	14	5
Italy	7	4
England	6	3
Brazil	2	2
Germany	2	1
France	2	1
Colombia	1	1
Netherlands	1	1

=== Continental rankings ===
Bold indicates the World's Best Man Club winner.

Year	Confederation	Winner
2020	**UEFA**	**(Germany) Bayern Munich**
2020	CONMEBOL	(Brazil) Palmeiras
2020	CONCACAF	(Mexico) UANL
2020	CAF	(Egypt) Al Ahly
2020	AFC	(South Korea) Ulsan Hyundai
2020	OFC	(New Caledonia) Magenta
2021	UEFA	(England) Manchester City
2021	**CONMEBOL**	**(Brazil) Palmeiras**
2021	CONCACAF	(Guatemala) Comunicaciones
2021	CAF	(Egypt) Al Ahly
2021	AFC	(South Korea) Ulsan Hyundai
2021	OFC	(New Zealand) Team Wellington
2022	UEFA	(England) Liverpool
2022	**CONMEBOL**	**(Brazil) Flamengo**
2022	CONCACAF	(Costa Rica) Alajuelense
2022	CAF	(Egypt) Al Ahly
2022	AFC	(South Korea) Jeonbuk Hyundai Motors
2022	OFC	(New Zealand) Auckland City
2023	**UEFA**	**(England) Manchester City**
2023	CONMEBOL	(Brazil) Fluminense
2023	CONCACAF	(Mexico) Club León
2023	CAF	(Egypt) Al Ahly
2023	AFC	(Saudi Arabia) Al Hilal
2023	OFC	(New Zealand) Auckland City
2024	**UEFA**	**(Spain) Real Madrid**
2024	CONMEBOL	(Brazil) Botafogo
2024	CONCACAF	(Costa Rica) Alajuelense
2024	CAF	(Egypt) Al Ahly
2024	AFC	(Saudi Arabia) Al Hilal
2024	OFC	(New Zealand) Auckland City
2025	**UEFA**	**(France) Paris Saint-Germain**
2025	CONMEBOL	(Brazil) Flamengo
2025	CONCACAF	(Mexico) Cruz Azul
2025	CAF	(Egypt) Pyramids
2025	AFC	(Saudi Arabia) Al Hilal
2025	OFC	(New Zealand) Auckland City

=== Continental Men's Clubs of the Century (1901–2000) ===
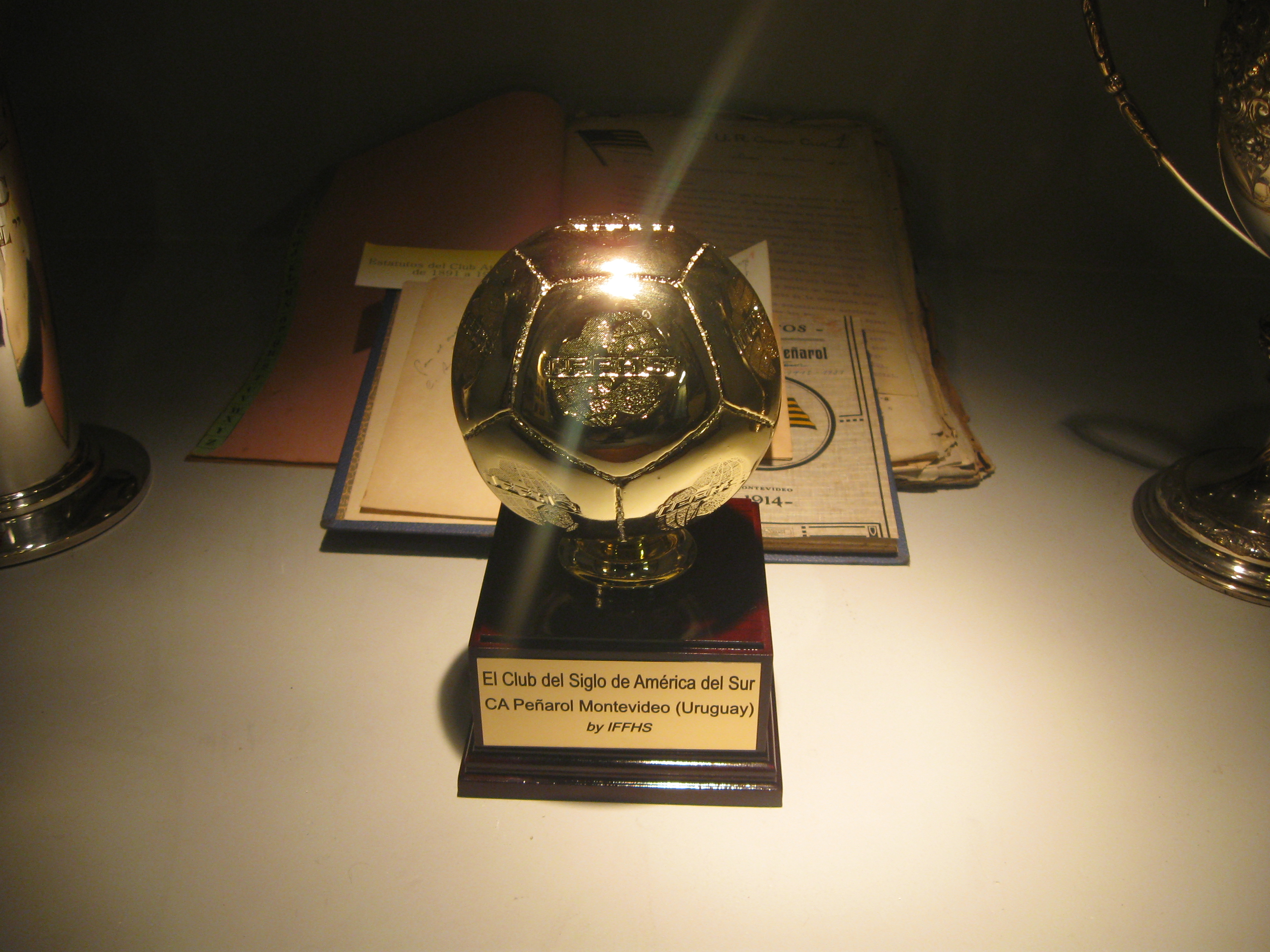
Peñarol's South America's Best Club of the Century trophy.

In 2009, the IFFHS released the results of a statistical study series which determined the best continental clubs of the 20th century. The ranking did not consider the performance of the teams in national football tournaments (except in the Oceania's club ranking due to limited editions held under OFC club competitions), the performance in the intercontinental or worldwide club competitions or those submitted in the IFFHS Club World Ranking, available since 1991.

Based on this study, which assigned a weighted score criteria applied for each competition analysed, the below six clubs were named as "continental clubs of the century" by the IFFHS between 10 September and 13 October 2009. These clubs were awarded with a golden trophy and a certificate during the World Football Gala celebrated at Fulham, London, on 11 May 2010.

Continental rankings
Rank	Europe	South America	CONCACAF	Africa	Asia	Oceania
**1**	**(Spain) Real Madrid**	**(Uruguay) Peñarol**	**(Costa Rica) Saprissa**	**(Ghana) Asante Kotoko**	**(Saudi Arabia) Al-Hilal**	**(Australia) South Melbourne**
2	(Italy) Juventus	(Argentina) Independiente	**(Honduras)** Olimpia	(Egypt) Al Ahly	**(Japan)** Yokohama F. Marinos	**(Australia)** Sydney City
3	(Spain) Barcelona	(Uruguay) Nacional	**(Guatemala)** Comunicaciones	(Egypt) Zamalek	**(Iran)** Esteghlal	**(Australia)** Marconi Stallions
4	(Italy) Milan	(Argentina) River Plate	**(Guatemala)** Municipal	(Cameroon) Canon Yaoundé	**(Iran)** Persepolis	**(Australia)** Wollongong Wolves
5	(Germany) Bayern Munich	(Paraguay) Olimpia	**(Suriname)** Transvaal	(Ivory Coast) ASEC Mimosas	**(South Korea)** Seongnam FC	**(New Zealand)** University-Mount Wellington
6	(Italy) Inter Milan	(Argentina) Boca Juniors	**(Costa Rica)** Alajuelense	**(Ghana)** Hearts of Oak	**(Saudi Arabia)** Al-Nassr	**(Australia)** Melbourne Knights
7	(Netherlands) Ajax	(Brazil) Cruzeiro	(Mexico) Necaxa	(Tunisia) Espérance de Tunis	**(South Korea)** Pohang Steelers	**(Australia)** Adelaide City
8	(England) Liverpool	(Brazil) São Paulo	(Mexico) Cruz Azul	(Guinea) Hafia FC	**(Japan)** Tokyo Verdy	**(New Zealand)** Napier City Rovers
9	(Portugal) Benfica	(Colombia) América de Cali	(El Salvador) Alianza	(Ivory Coast) Africa Sports	**(China)** Liaoning	**(Vanuatu)** Tafea
10	(Belgium) Anderlecht	(Brazil) Palmeiras	(Mexico) América	(Democratic Republic of the Congo) Englebert	**(Thailand)** Thai Farmers Bank	**(Australia)** Sydney United

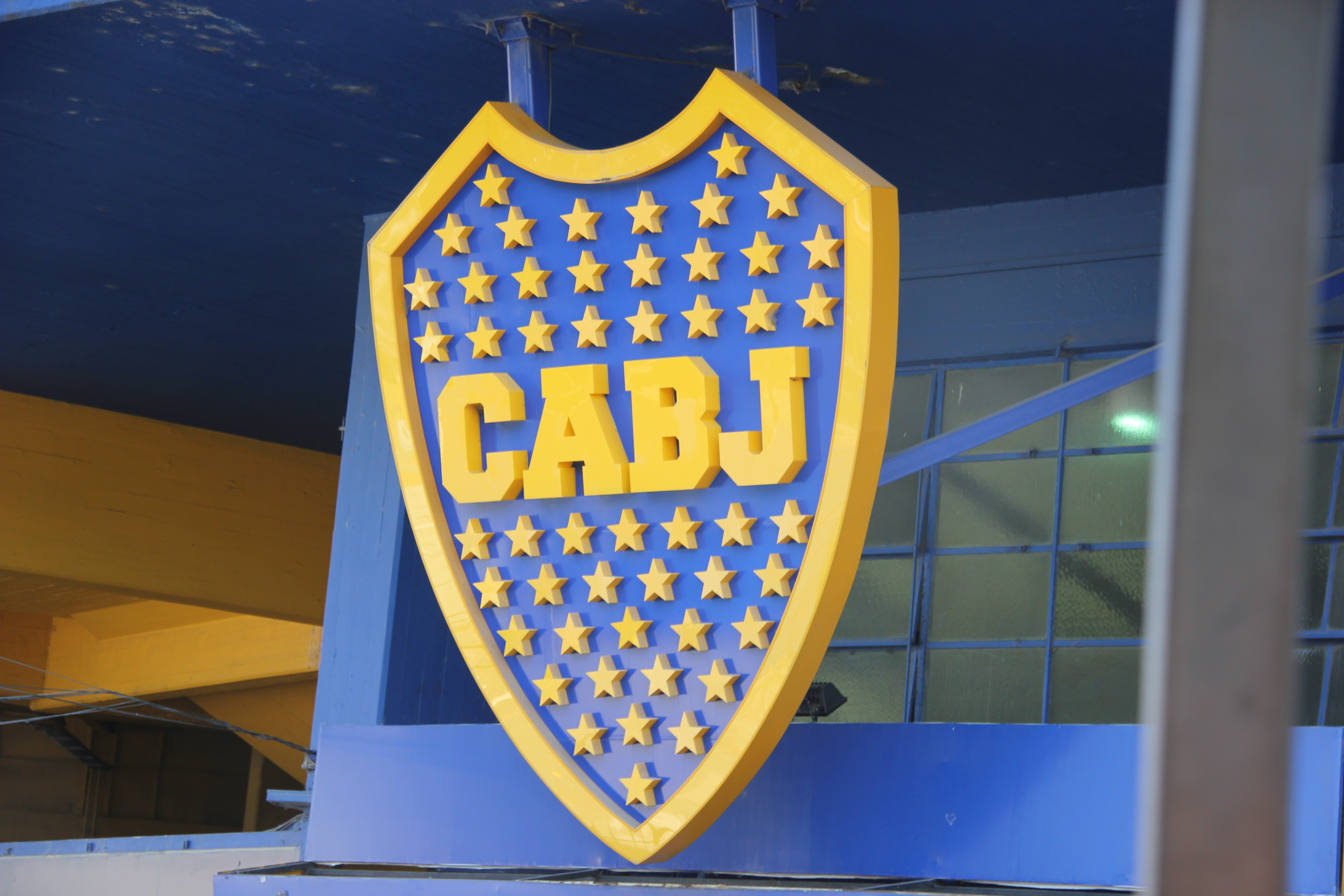
Boca Juniors, South American team of the decade (2001–2010).

=== The World's Best Man Club of the Decade (2001–2010) ===
In 2012, the IFFHS recognised Barcelona as the World's Best Club Team of the Decade for the first decade of the 21st century (2001–2010).

Top 10 clubs
Rank	Club	Confederation	Points
**1**	**(Spain) Barcelona**	**UEFA**	**2,550**
2	(England) Manchester United	UEFA	2,523
3	(England) Liverpool	UEFA	2,414
4	(England) Arsenal	UEFA	2,410
5	(Italy) Inter Milan	UEFA	2,358
6	(Germany) Bayern Munich	UEFA	2,315
7	(Italy) Milan	UEFA	2,296
8	(Spain) Real Madrid	UEFA	2,257
9	(England) Chelsea	UEFA	2,235
10	(Argentina) Boca Juniors	CONMEBOL	2,095

Top 5 continental clubs
Rank	Europe	South America	CONCACAF	Africa	Asia	Oceania
**1**	**(Spain) Barcelona**	**(Argentina) Boca Juniors**	**(Mexico) América**	**(Egypt) Al Ahly**	**(Saudi Arabia) Al-Hilal**	**(New Zealand) Auckland City**
2	(England) Manchester United	(Brazil) São Paulo	**(Mexico)** Guadalajara	(Tunisia) Espérance de Tunis	**(Uzbekistan)** Pakhtakor Tashkent	**(Fiji)** Ba
3	(England) Liverpool	(Argentina) River Plate	**(Mexico)** Cruz Azul	(Tunisia) Étoile du Sahel	**(Saudi Arabia)** Al-Ittihad	**(Australia)** Perth Glory
4	(England) Arsenal	(Brazil) Cruzeiro	**(Mexico)** Pachuca	(Ivory Coast) ASEC Mimosas	**(Japan)** Gamba Osaka	**(New Zealand)** Waitakere United
5	(Italy) Inter Milan	(Brazil) Santos	**(Mexico)** Toluca	(Cameroon) Coton Sport	**(Japan)** Kashima Antlers	**(French Polynesia)** Pirae

=== The World's Best Men Club of the Decade (2011–2020) ===
In 2021, Barcelona were recognised as the world's best club also for the second decade (2011–2020).

Top 10 clubs
Rank	League	Confederation	Points
**1**	**(Spain) Barcelona**	**UEFA**	**2,877**
2	(Spain) Real Madrid	UEFA	2,782
3	(Germany) Bayern Munich	UEFA	2,594.5
4	(France) Paris Saint-Germain	UEFA	2,357
5	(Spain) Atlético Madrid	UEFA	2,302
6	(Italy) Juventus	UEFA	2,272
7	(England) Chelsea	UEFA	2,113
7	(England) Manchester City	UEFA	2,113
9	(England) Manchester United	UEFA	2,020
10	(England) Arsenal	UEFA	2,016

Top 5 continental clubs
Rank	Europe	South America	CONCACAF	Africa	Asia	Oceania
**1**	**(Spain) Barcelona**	**(Brazil) Grêmio**	**(Mexico) UANL**	**(Tunisia) Espérance de Tunis**	**(South Korea) Jeonbuk Hyundai Motors**	**(New Zealand) Auckland City**
2	(Spain) Real Madrid	(Colombia) Atlético Nacional	**(Mexico)** Monterrey	(Egypt) Al Ahly	(Saudi Arabia) Al-Hilal	(New Zealand) Team Wellington
3	(Germany) Bayern Munich	(Argentina) River Plate	(Mexico) América	(Tunisia) Étoile du Sahel	**(South Korea)** Ulsan Hyundai	(New Caledonia) Magenta
4	(France) Paris Saint-Germain	(Argentina) Boca Juniors	**(Mexico)** Santos Laguna	(Egypt) Zamalek	**(South Korea)** FC Seoul	(New Caledonia) Hienghène Sport
5	(Spain) Atlético Madrid	(Paraguay) Club Libertad	**(Mexico)** Cruz Azul	(Democratic Republic of the Congo) TP Mazembe	(Saudi Arabia) Al-Ahli	**(French Polynesia)** Tefana

=== The World's Best Men Club of the Month ===
Month	Year	Club	Ref.
January	2023	(Portugal) Porto	
February	2023	(Spain) Real Madrid	
March	2023	(Netherlands) Feyenoord	
April	2023	(Spain) Real Madrid (2)	
May	2023	(Italy) Inter Milan	
June	2023	(Brazil) Flamengo	
July	2023	(Brazil) Corinthians	
August	2023	(Brazil) Palmeiras	
September	2023	(Spain) Barcelona	
October	2023	(Germany) Bayern Munich	
November	2023	(Netherlands) PSV Eindhoven	
December	2023	(England) Manchester City	
January	2024	(Italy) Juventus	
February	2024	(Netherlands) Feyenoord (2)	
March	2024	(Italy) Milan	
April	2024	(England) Manchester City (2)	
May	2024	(Italy) Atalanta	
June	2024	(Brazil) Internacional	
July	2024	(Romania) FCSB	
August	2024	(Czech Republic) Sparta Prague	
September	2024	(Brazil) Corinthians (2)	
October	2024	(Italy) Fiorentina	
November	2024	(Spain) Atlético Madrid	
December	2024	(Spain) Real Madrid (3)	
January	2025	(England) Arsenal	
February	2025	(Spain) Real Madrid (4)	
March	2025	(Spain) Barcelona (2)	
April	2025	(Spain) Barcelona (3)	
May	2025	(France) Paris Saint-Germain	
June	2025	(Brazil) Fluminense	
July	2025	(England) Chelsea	
August	2025	(Brazil) Flamengo (2)	
September	2025	(Germany) Bayern Munich (2)	
October	2025	(England) Arsenal (2)	
November	2025	(Spain) Atlético Madrid (2)	
December	2025	(France) Paris Saint-Germain (2)	
January	2026	(Germany) Bayern Munich (3)	

== Women's winners ==
IFFHS World's Best Woman Club
- Sport: Association football
- Competition: association and confederation tournaments
- Awarded for: Best performing woman club of the calendar year
- Presented by: International Federation of Football History & Statistics

History
- First award: 2012
- Editions: 14
- First winner: (France) Lyon
- Most wins: (France) Lyon (7 awards)
- Most recent: (Spain) Barcelona (5th award)
- Website: iffhs.com/en

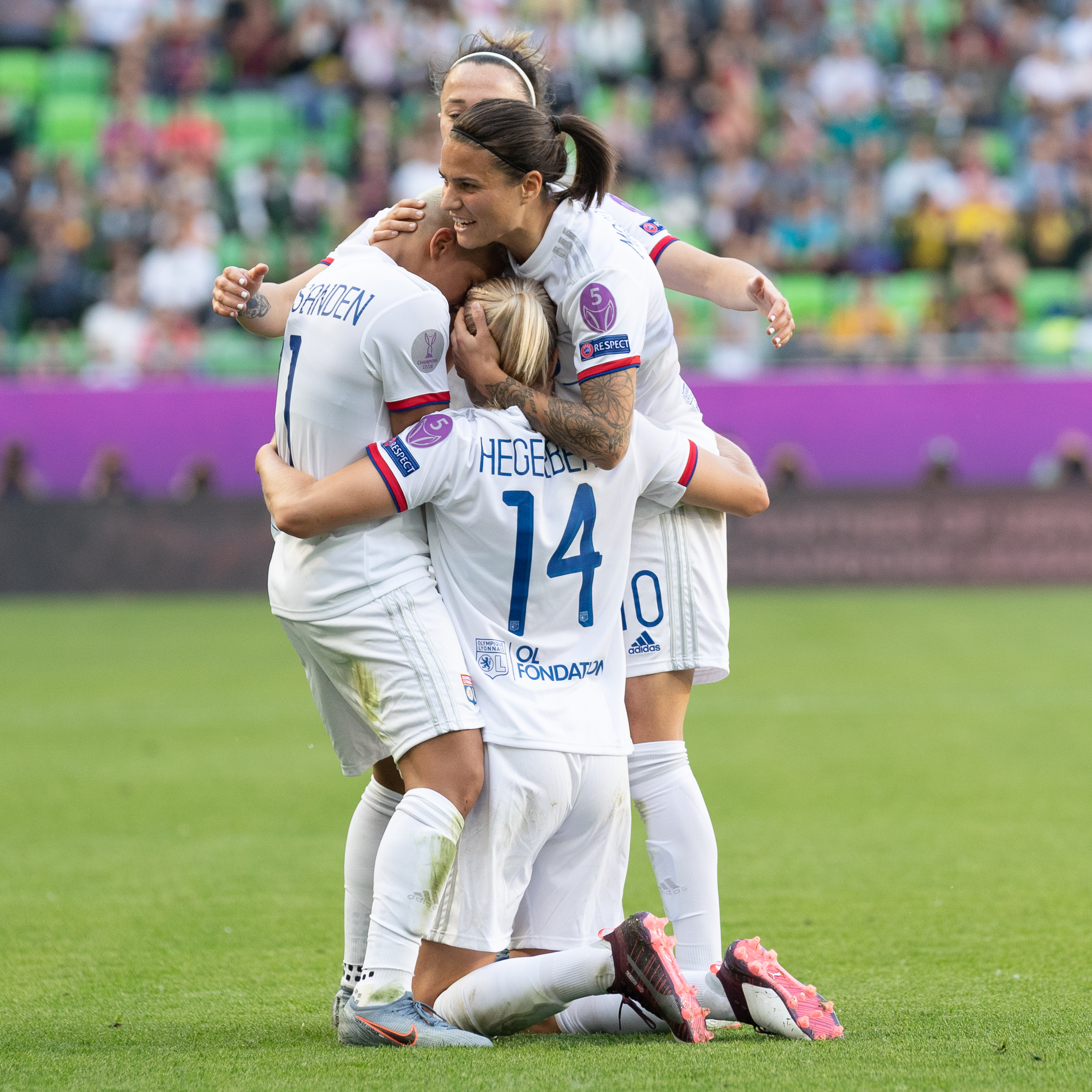
Lyon

=== List of winners ===
Year	Rank	Club	Points
2012	**1st**	**(France) Lyon**	**132**
2012	2nd	**(Germany)** 1. FFC Frankfurt	96
2012	3rd	**(Germany)** 1. FFC Turbine Potsdam	32
2013	**1st**	**(Germany) VfL Wolfsburg**	**140**
2013	2nd	(France) Lyon	96
2013	3rd	(United States) Portland Thorns FC	41
2014	**1st**	**(Germany) VfL Wolfsburg**	**189**
2014	2nd	(France) Lyon	73
2014	3rd	(United States) FC Kansas City	48
2015	**1st**	**(France) Lyon**	**142**
2015	2nd	**(Germany)** 1. FFC Frankfurt	100
2015	3rd	(Germany) Bayern Munich	46
2016	**1st**	**(France) Lyon**	**241**
2016	2nd	(Germany) VfL Wolfsburg	101
2016	3rd	(Germany) Bayern Munich	34
2017	**1st**	**(France) Lyon**	**303**
2017	2nd	(France) Paris Saint-Germain	79
2017	3rd	(Germany) VfL Wolfsburg	78
2018	**1st**	**(France) Lyon**	**302**
2018	2nd	(Germany) VfL Wolfsburg	138
2018	3rd	(United States) North Carolina Courage	37
2019	**1st**	**(France) Lyon**	**284**
2019	2nd	(Spain) Barcelona	105
2019	3rd	(United States) North Carolina Courage	36
2020	**1st**	**(France) Lyon**	**360**
2020	2nd	(Germany) Bayern Munich (France) Paris Saint-Germain (United States) North Carolina Courage (England) Chelsea (Spain) Barcelona	5
2020	3rd	–	
2021	**1st**	**(Spain) Barcelona**	**225**
2021	2nd	(England) Chelsea	40
2021	3rd	(Brazil) Corinthians	30
2022	**1st**	**(Spain) Barcelona**	**738**
2022	2nd	(England) Chelsea	546
2022	3rd	(France) Lyon	532
2023	**1st**	**(Spain) Barcelona**	**609**
2023	2nd	(France) Lyon	434
2023	3rd	(Brazil) Corinthians	384
2024	**1st**	**(Spain) Barcelona**	**324**
2024	2nd	(France) Lyon	256
2024	3rd	(England) Chelsea	228
2025	**1st**	**(Spain) Barcelona**	**329**
2025	2nd	(Spain) Real Madrid	238
2025	3rd	(Germany) Bayern Munich	233

=== Statistics ===
Winners (2012–present)
Club	Wins	Years
(France) Lyon	7	2012, 2015, 2016, 2017, 2018, 2019, 2020
(Spain) Barcelona	5	2021, 2022, 2023, 2024, 2025
(Germany) VfL Wolfsburg	2	2013, 2014

Wins by country
Country	Total	Clubs
France	7	1
Spain	5	1
Germany	2	1

=== Continental rankings (women) ===
Bold indicates the World's Best Woman Club winner.

Year	Confederation	Winner
2021	**UEFA**	**(Spain) Barcelona**
2021	CONMEBOL	(Brazil) Corinthians
2021	CONCACAF	(United States) Portland Thorns FC
2021	CAF	(Ghana) Hasaacas
2021	AFC	(Australia) Melbourne Victory
2021	OFC	(New Zealand) Southern United

Year	Confederation	Winner
2022	**UEFA**	**(Spain) Barcelona**
2022	CONMEBOL	(Brazil) Palmeiras
2022	CONCACAF	(Mexico) Chivas Guadalajara
2022	CAF	(South Africa) Mamelodi Sundowns
2022	AFC	(South Korea) Incheon Red Angels
2022	OFC	(New Zealand) Northern Rovers

Year	Confederation	Winner
2023	**UEFA**	**(Spain) Barcelona**
2023	CONMEBOL	(Brazil) Corinthians
2023	CONCACAF	(Mexico) América
2023	CAF	(South Africa) Mamelodi Sundowns
2023	AFC	(Japan) Urawa Red Diamonds
2023	OFC	(New Zealand) Western Springs (New Zealand) Auckland United

Year	Confederation	Winner
2024	**UEFA**	**(Spain) Barcelona**
2024	CONMEBOL	(Brazil) Corinthians
2024	CONCACAF	(Mexico) Tigres UANL
2024	CAF	
2024	AFC	(South Korea) Incheon Red Angels
2024	OFC	

=== The World's Best Woman Club of the Decade (2011–2020) ===
In 2021, Lyon were recognised as the world's best club for the second decade (2011–2020).

Top 10 clubs
Rank	Club	Confederation	Points
**1**	**(France) Lyon**	**UEFA**	**178**
2	(Germany) VfL Wolfsburg	UEFA	130
3	(Germany) Bayern Munich	UEFA	98
4	(France) Paris Saint-Germain	UEFA	97
5	(United States) Portland Thorns FC	CONCACAF	87
6	(Spain) Barcelona	UEFA	74
7	(England) Chelsea	UEFA	69
8	(United States) North Carolina Courage	CONCACAF	67
9	(England) Manchester City	UEFA	48
10	(Sweden) Rosengård	UEFA	47

=== The World's Best Women Club of the Month ===
Month	Year	Club	Ref.
January	2025	(Spain) Barcelona	
February	2025	(Spain) Barcelona (2)	
March	2025	(Spain) Barcelona (3)	
April	2025	(Spain) Barcelona (4)	
May	2025	(Brazil) Corinthians	
June	2025	(Brazil) Palmeiras	
July	2025	(Mexico) Pachuca	
August	2025	(Brazil) Corinthians (2)	
September	2025	(Netherlands) Twente	
October	2025	(Spain) Barcelona (5)	
November	2025	(Germany) Bayern Munich	
December	2025	(Spain) Barcelona (6)	
January	2026	(Spain) Barcelona (7)	

== See also ==
- International Federation of Football History & Statistics
- IFFHS World's Best International Goal Scorer
- IFFHS World's Best Top Goal Scorer
- IFFHS World's Best National Coach
- IFFHS World's Best Club Coach
- IFFHS World's Best Goalkeeper
- IFFHS World's Best Player
- IFFHS World Team
