= IFFHS World's Best Player =

Football award

IFFHS World's Best Man Player
- Sport: Association football
- Awarded for: Best performing man player of the calendar year
- Presented by: International Federation of Football History & Statistics

History
- First award: 1988
- Editions: 8
- First winner: (Netherlands) Marco van Basten
- Most wins: (Netherlands) Marco van Basten (Poland) Robert Lewandowski (2 awards each)
- Most recent: (France) Ousmane Dembélé (1st award)
- Website: iffhs.com/en

The IFFHS World's Best Player is a football award given annually from 1988 to 1990, and since 2020, to the world's best player. The award is given by the International Federation of Football History & Statistics (IFFHS).

== Men's winners ==
=== List of winners ===
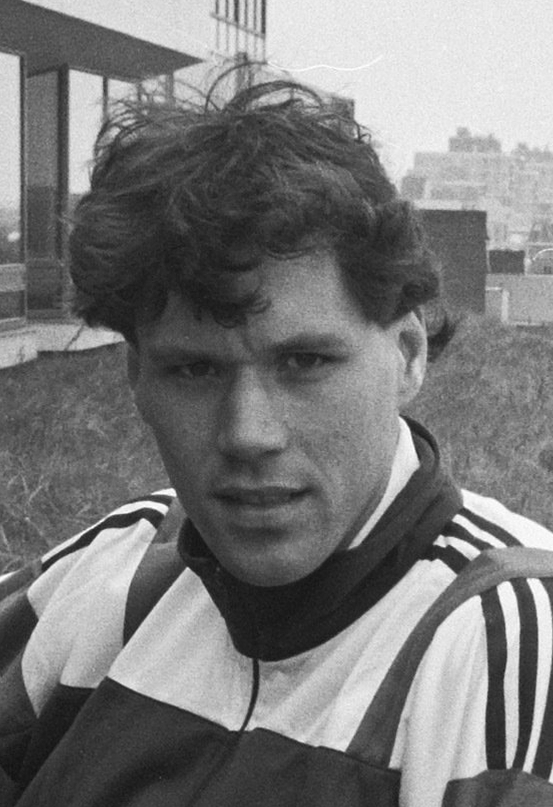
Marco van Basten, first winner of the award in 1988

From 1991 until 2009, FIFA continued this distinction named "FIFA World Player of the Year"; this award was later replaced by the FIFA Ballon d'Or in 2010, and The Best FIFA Men's Player in 2016.

Year	Rank	Winner	Club(s)	Points
1988	**1st**	**(Netherlands) Marco van Basten**	**(Italy) Milan**	**101**
1988	2nd	**(Argentina)** Diego Maradona	**(Italy)** Napoli	92
1988	3rd	**(Netherlands)** Ruud Gullit	(Italy) Milan	71
1989	**1st**	**(Netherlands) Marco van Basten**	**(Italy) Milan**	**132**
1989	2nd	**(Italy)** Franco Baresi	(Italy) Milan	62
1989	3rd	**(Netherlands)** Ruud Gullit	(Italy) Milan	57
1990	**1st**	**(Germany) Lothar Matthäus**	**(Italy) Inter Milan**	**174**
1990	2nd	(Italy) Salvatore Schillaci	**(Italy)** Juventus	56
1990	3rd	**(Italy)** Franco Baresi	**(Italy)** AC Milan	52
1990	3rd	**(England)** Paul Gascoigne	**(England)** Tottenham Hotspur	52
2020	**1st**	**(Poland) Robert Lewandowski**	**(Germany) Bayern Munich**	**95%**
2021	**1st**	**(Poland) Robert Lewandowski**	**(Germany) Bayern Munich**	**150**
2021	2nd	**(Argentina)** Lionel Messi	**(Spain)** Barcelona **(France)** Paris Saint-Germain	105
2021	3rd	**(Italy)** Jorginho	**(England)** Chelsea	40
2022	**1st**	**(Argentina) Lionel Messi**	**(France) Paris Saint-Germain**	**275**
2022	2nd	**(France)** Kylian Mbappé	**(France)** Paris Saint-Germain	35
2022	3rd	**(France)** Karim Benzema	**(Spain)** Real Madrid	30
2023	**1st**	**(Norway) Erling Haaland**	**(England) Manchester City**	**208**
2023	2nd	**(France)** Kylian Mbappé	**(France)** Paris Saint-Germain	105
2023	3rd	**(Argentina)** Lionel Messi	**(France)** Paris Saint-Germain **(United States)** Inter Miami	85
2024	**1st**	**(Spain) Rodri**	**(England) Manchester City**	**191**
2024	2nd	**(Brazil)** Vinícius Júnior	**(Spain)** Real Madrid	166
2024	3rd	**(England)** Jude Bellingham	**(Spain)** Real Madrid	62
2025	**1st**	**(France) Ousmane Dembélé**	**(France) Paris Saint-Germain**	**153**
2025	2nd	**(Spain)** Lamine Yamal	**(Spain)** Barcelona	97
2025	3rd	**(England)** Harry Kane	**(Germany)** Bayern Munich	62

=== Statistics ===
Winners (1988–present)
Player	Wins	Years
(Netherlands) Marco van Basten	2	1988, 1989
(Poland) Robert Lewandowski	2	2020, 2021
(Germany) Lothar Matthäus	1	1990
(Argentina) Lionel Messi	1	2022
(Norway) Erling Haaland	1	2023
(Spain) Rodri	1	2024
(France) Ousmane Dembélé	1	2025

Wins by club
Club	Total	Players
(England) Manchester City	2	2
(France) Paris Saint-Germain	2	2
(Italy) Milan	2	1
(Germany) Bayern Munich	2	1
(Italy) Inter Milan	1	1

Wins by nationality
Nationality	Total	Players
Netherlands	2	1
Poland	2	1
Germany	1	1
Argentina	1	1
Norway	1	1
Spain	1	1
France	1	1

=== Continental winners ===
Bold indicates the World's Best Man Player winner.

Year	Confederation	Winner	Club(s)
2020	**UEFA**	**(Poland) Robert Lewandowski**	**(Germany) Bayern Munich**
2020	CONMEBOL	(Argentina) Lionel Messi	(Spain) Barcelona
2020	CONCACAF	(Canada) Alphonso Davies	(Germany) Bayern Munich
2020	CAF	(Senegal) Sadio Mané	**(England)** Liverpool
2020	AFC	(South Korea) Son Heung-min	**(England)** Tottenham Hotspur
2020	OFC	(New Zealand) Chris Wood	**(England)** Burnley
2021	**UEFA**	**(Poland) Robert Lewandowski**	**(Germany) Bayern Munich**
2021	CONMEBOL	**(Argentina)** Lionel Messi	**(Spain)** Barcelona **(France)** Paris Saint-Germain
2021	CONCACAF	(Canada) Alphonso Davies	(Germany) Bayern Munich
2021	CAF	(Egypt) Mohamed Salah	**(England)** Liverpool
2021	AFC	(South Korea) Son Heung-min	**(England)** Tottenham Hotspur
2021	OFC	(New Zealand) Chris Wood	**(England)** Burnley
2022	UEFA	(France) Kylian Mbappé	**(France)** Paris Saint-Germain
2022	**CONMEBOL**	**(Argentina) Lionel Messi**	**(France) Paris Saint-Germain**
2022	CONCACAF	(Canada) Alphonso Davies	(Germany) Bayern Munich
2022	CAF	(Senegal) Sadio Mané	**(England)** Liverpool (Germany) Bayern Munich
2022	AFC	(South Korea) Son Heung-min	**(England)** Tottenham Hotspur
2022	OFC	(New Zealand) Chris Wood	**(England)** Burnley **(England)** Newcastle United

=== Men's Historical All-time World Best Players ===
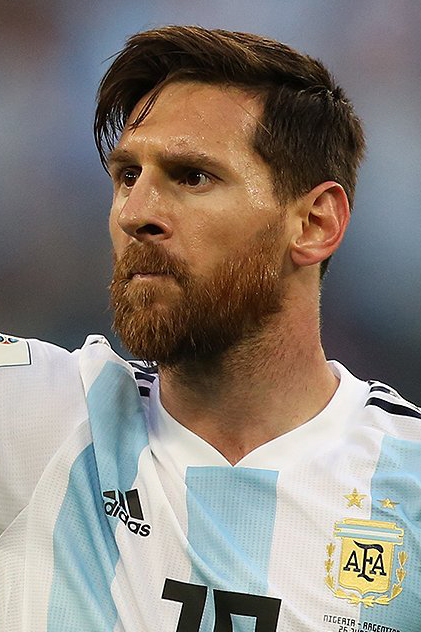
Lionel Messi, All-time Men's World Best Player

Top 10 players
Rank	Player	Nationality
**1**	**Lionel Messi**	**Argentina**
2	Pelé	Brazil
3	Diego Maradona	Argentina
4	Cristiano Ronaldo	Portugal
5	Johan Cruyff	Netherlands
6	Ronaldo	Brazil
7	Zinedine Zidane	France
8	Franz Beckenbauer	West Germany
9	Alfredo Di Stéfano	Argentina; Spain
10	Ronaldinho	Brazil

=== The World's Best Man Player of the 19th Century (until 1900) ===
In November 2021 IFFHS announced the Dream Team of the 19th Century and the top 3 players.

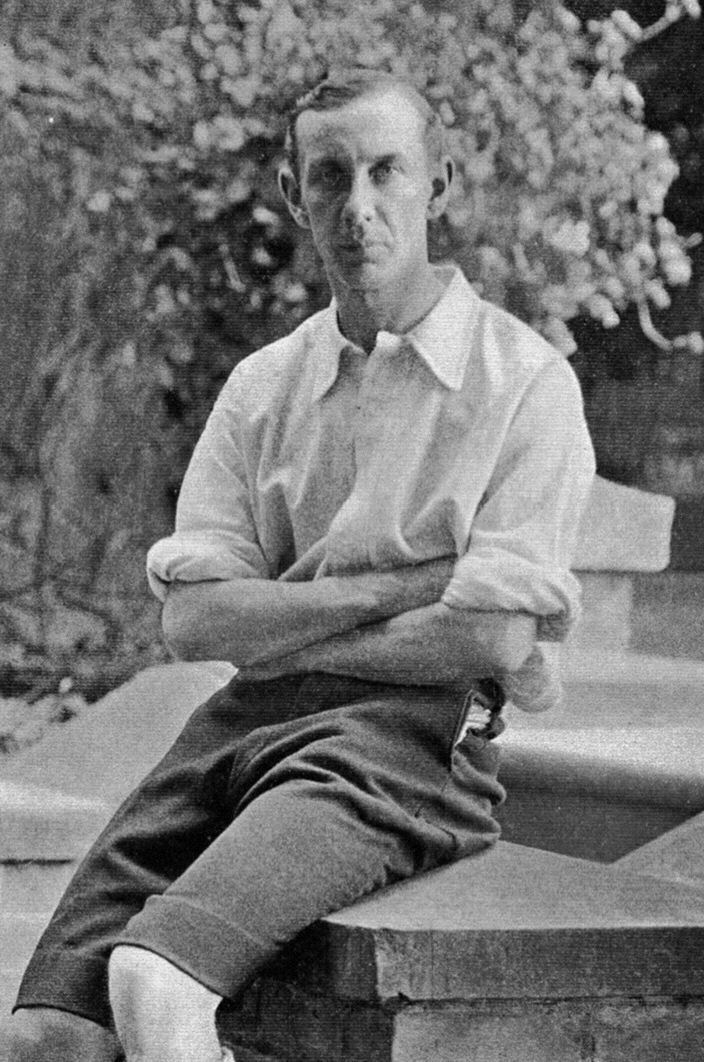
Gilbert Oswald Smith, Male Player of the 19th Century

Top 3 players
Rank	Player	Nationality
**1**	**Gilbert Oswald Smith**	**England**
2	John Goodall	England
3	Steve Bloomer	England

=== The World's Best Player of the 20th Century (1901–2000) ===
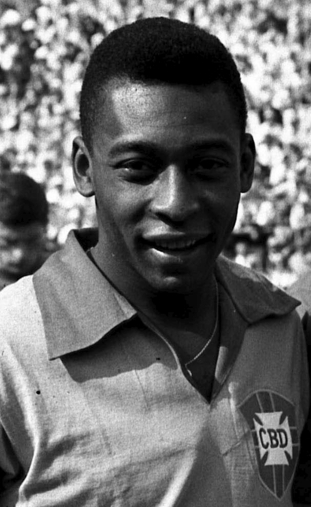
Pelé, Male Player of the 20th Century

Top 10 players
Rank	Player	Nationality	Points
**1**	**Pelé**	**Brazil**	**1705**
2	Johan Cruyff	Netherlands	1303
3	Franz Beckenbauer	West Germany	1228
4	Alfredo Di Stéfano	Argentina; Spain	1215
5	Diego Maradona	Argentina	1214
6	Ferenc Puskás	Hungary	810
7	Michel Platini	France	722
8	Garrincha	Brazil	624
9	Eusébio	Portugal	544
10	Bobby Charlton	England	508

=== The Best Man Player of the Decade (2011–2020) ===
Confederation	First	Second	Third
World	(Argentina) Lionel Messi	(Portugal) Cristiano Ronaldo	(Spain) Andrés Iniesta
UEFA	(Portugal) Cristiano Ronaldo	(Spain) Sergio Ramos	(Germany) Manuel Neuer
CONMEBOL	(Argentina) Lionel Messi	(Brazil) Neymar	(Brazil) Dani Alves
CONCACAF	(Costa Rica) Keylor Navas	(Mexico) Javier Hernández	(United States) Clint Dempsey
CAF	(Egypt) Mohamed Salah	(Senegal) Sadio Mané	(Algeria) Riyad Mahrez
AFC	(South Korea) Son Heung-min	(Japan) Keisuke Honda	(Saudi Arabia) Salem Al-Dawsari
OFC	(New Zealand) Chris Wood	(New Zealand) Winston Reid	(New Zealand) Marco Rojas

=== The Best European Player (1956–1990) ===
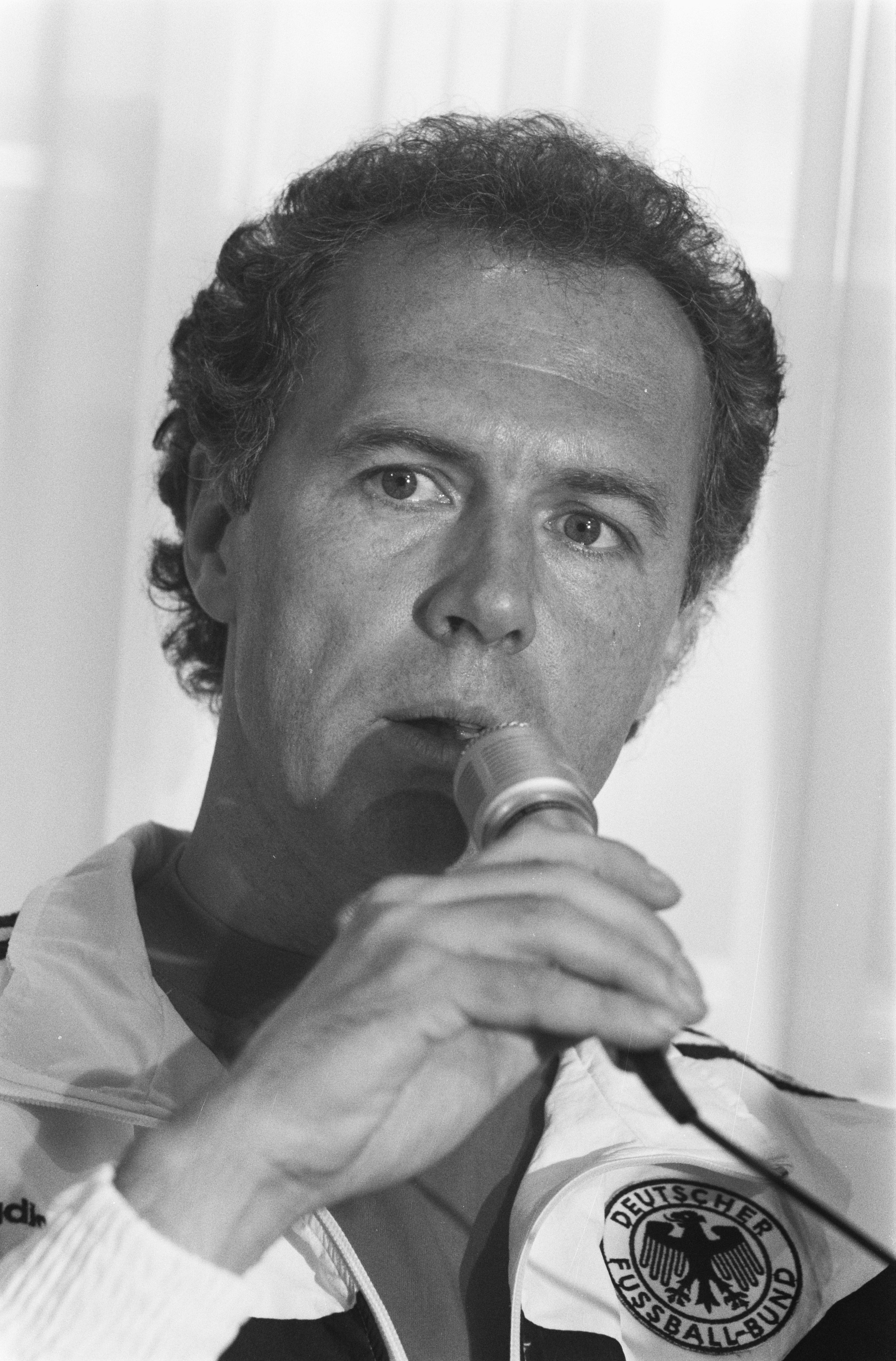
Franz Beckenbauer, Best European Player for the 1956–1990 period

On 24 April 1990, before the 1990 FIFA World Cup, IFFHS gave out an award for the best European player taking into consideration players who were voted in the shortlist of the France Football's Ballon d'Or from 1956 until 1989.

Top 10 players
Rank	Player	Nationality
**1**	**Franz Beckenbauer**	**West Germany**
2	Michel Platini	France
3	Johan Cruyff	Netherlands
4	Eusébio	Portugal
5	Gerd Müller	West Germany
6	Karl-Heinz Rummenigge	West Germany
7	Luis Suárez	Spain
8	Bobby Charlton	England
9	Alfredo Di Stéfano	Spain
10	Raymond Kopa	France

=== Men Legends ===
Phase 1 (48 players)
Player	Nationality
Majed Abdullah	Saudi Arabia
Mohamed Aboutrika	Egypt
Roberto Baggio	Italy
Franz Beckenbauer	Germany
David Beckham	England
Bhaichung Bhutia	India
Oleg Blokhin	Ukraine
Cha Bum-kun	South Korea
Antonio Carbajal	Mexico
Bobby Charlton	England
José Luis Chilavert	Paraguay
Tanju Çolak	Turkey
Johan Cruyff	Netherlands
Ali Daei	Iran
Alfredo Di Stéfano	Argentina
Landon Donovan	United States
Mahmoud El Khatib	Egypt
Eusébio	Portugal
Luís Figo	Portugal
Garrincha	Brazil
Paco Gento	Spain
Ryan Giggs	Wales
Ruud Gullit	Netherlands
Hao Haidong	China
Sun Jihai	China
Nwankwo Kanu	Nigeria
Rabah Madjer	Algeria
Diego Maradona	Argentina
Lothar Matthäus	Germany
Stanley Matthews	England
Roger Milla	Cameroon
Gerd Müller	Germany
Hidetoshi Nakata	Japan
Pelé	Brazil
Michel Platini	France
Ferenc Puskás	Hungary
Lucas Radebe	South Africa
Ronaldo	Brazil
Wynton Rufer	New Zealand
Hugo Sánchez	Mexico
Juan Alberto Schiaffino	Uruguay
Marco van Basten	Netherlands
George Weah	Liberia
Jasem Yaqoub	Kuwait
Lev Yashin	Russia
Zico	Brazil
Zinedine Zidane	France
Dino Zoff	Italy

Phase 2 (48 players)
Player	Nationality
Franco Baresi	Italy
Gabriel Batistuta	Argentina
Dennis Bergkamp	Netherlands
Zbigniew Boniek	Poland
Roberto Carlos	Brazil
Petr Čech	Czech Republic
Kenny Dalglish	Scotland
Edgar Davids	Netherlands
Alessandro Del Piero	Italy
Didier Drogba	Ivory Coast
Samuel Eto'o	Cameroon
Enzo Francescoli	Uruguay
Gheorge Hagi	Romania
Thierry Henry	France
Oliver Kahn	Germany
Kaká	Brazil
Kevin Keegan	England
Mario Kempes	Argentina
Miroslav Klose	Germany
Ronald Koeman	Netherlands
Philipp Lahm	Germany
Michael Laudrup	Denmark
Younis Mahmoud	Iraq
Paolo Maldini	Italy
Rafael Márquez	Mexico
Pavel Nedvěd	Czech Republic
Mohammed Noor	Saudi Arabia
Jay-Jay Okocha	Nigeria
Abedi Pele	Ghana
Jean-Marie Pfaff	Belgium
Andrea Pirlo	Italy
Carles Puyol	Spain
Raúl	Spain
Frank Rijkaard	Netherlands
Rivaldo	Brazil
Romário	Brazil
Ronaldinho	Brazil
Paolo Rossi	Italy
Karl-Heinz Rummenigge	Germany
Peter Schmeichel	Denmark
Andriy Shevchenko	Ukraine
Hristo Stoichkov	Bulgaria
Davor Šuker	Croatia
Francesco Totti	Italy
Carlos Valderrama	Colombia
Ruud van Nistelrooy	Netherlands
Robin van Persie	Netherlands
Xavi	Spain

Phase 3-A (16 players)
Player	Nationality
Gianluigi Buffon	Italy
Iker Casillas	Spain
Zlatan Ibrahimović	Sweden
Andrés Iniesta	Spain
Mesut Özil	Germany
Franck Ribéry	France
Arjen Robben	Netherlands
Daniel Passarella	Argentina
Mikel John Obi	Nigeria
Wayne Rooney	England
Yousuf Al-Thunayan	Saudi Arabia
Mubarak Mustafa	Qatar
Toni Kroos	Germany
Sócrates	Brazil
Philipp Lahm	Germany
Daniele De Rossi	Italy

=== The Men's Player of the Month ===
Month	Year	Player	Club	Ref.
January	2025	(Egypt) Mohamed Salah	(England) Liverpool	
February	2025	(France) Kylian Mbappé	(Spain) Real Madrid	
March	2025	(Spain) Nico Williams	(Spain) Athletic Bilbao	
April	2025	(Spain) Lamine Yamal	(Spain) Barcelona	
May	2025	(France) Désiré Doué	(France) Paris Saint-Germain	
June	2025	(Portugal) Nuno Mendes	(France) Paris Saint-Germain	
July	2025	(England) Cole Palmer	(England) Chelsea	
August	2025	(Uruguay) Giorgian de Arrascaeta	(Brazil) Flamengo	
September	2025	(Norway) Erling Haaland	(England) Manchester City	
October	2025	(England) Harry Kane	(Germany) Bayern Munich	
November	2025	(England) Bukayo Saka	(England) Arsenal	
December	2025	(France) Rayan Cherki	(England) Manchester City	
January	2026	(Brazil) Raphinha	(Spain) Barcelona	
February	2026	(Brazil) Vinícius Júnior	(Spain) Real Madrid	

== Women's winners ==
IFFHS World's Best Woman Player
- Sport: Association football
- Awarded for: Best performing woman player of the calendar year
- Presented by: International Federation of Football History & Statistics

History
- First award: 2020
- Editions: 5
- First winner: (Denmark) Pernille Harder
- Most wins: (Spain) (Spain) Aitana Bonmatí (3 awards)
- Most recent: (Spain) Aitana Bonmatí (3rd award)
- Website: iffhs.com/en

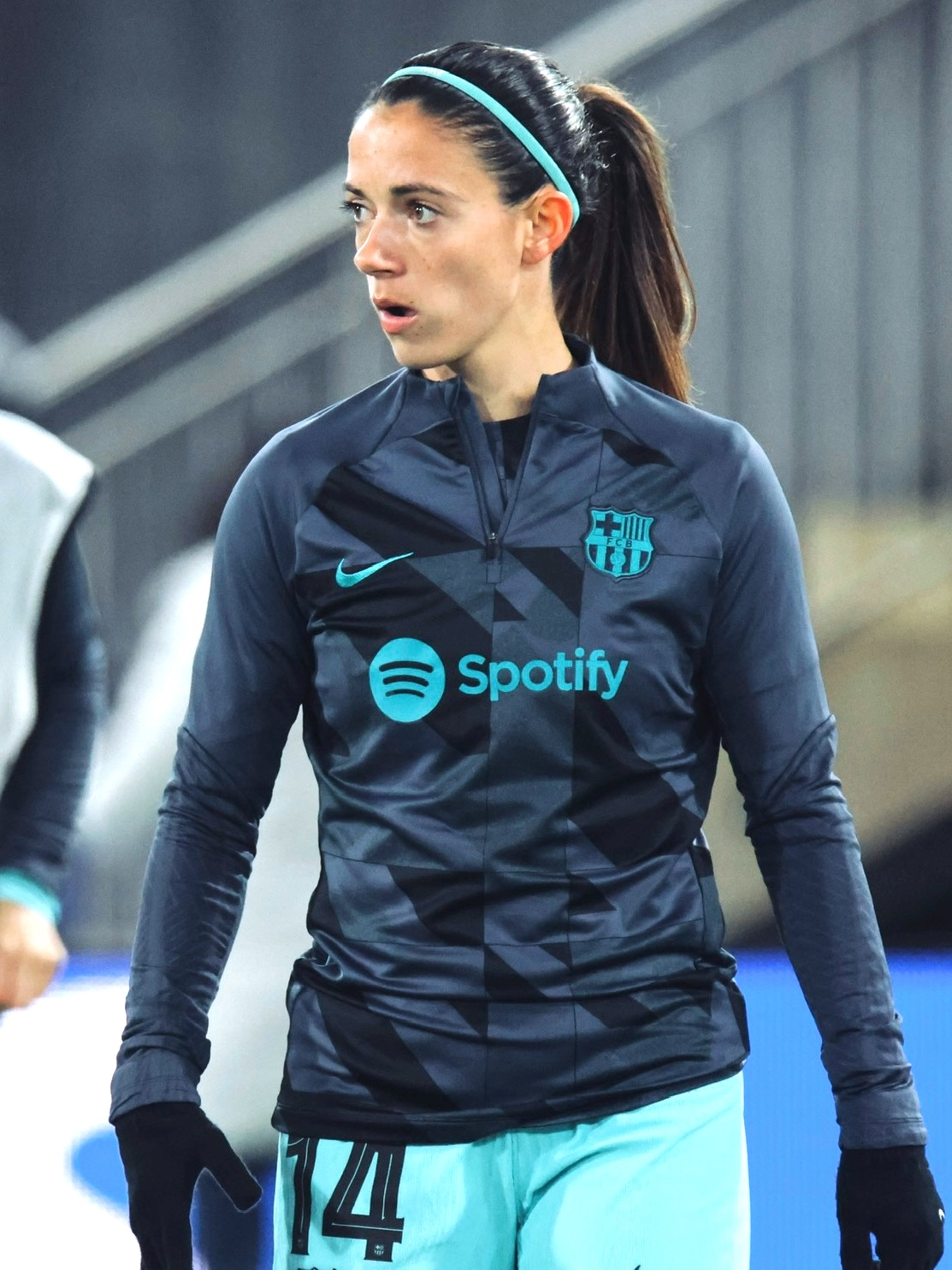
Aitana Bonmatí has won the award a record three times in a row.

=== List of winners ===
Year	Rank	Winner	Club(s)	Points
2020	**1st**	**(Denmark) Pernille Harder**	**(Germany) VfL Wolfsburg** **(England) Chelsea**	–
2020	2nd	(France) Wendie Renard	(France) Lyon	–
2020	2nd	(England) Lucy Bronze	(France) Lyon (England) Manchester City	–
2021	**1st**	**(Spain) Alexia Putellas**	**(Spain) Barcelona**	**135**
2021	2nd	(Australia) Sam Kerr	(England) Chelsea	35
2021	3rd	(United States) Sam Mewis	(England) Manchester City (United States) North Carolina Courage	30
2022	**1st**	**(Spain) Alexia Putellas**	**(Spain) Barcelona**	**115**
2022	2nd	(England) Beth Mead	(England) Arsenal	55
2022	3rd	(France) Wendie Renard	(France) Lyon	30
2023	**1st**	**(Spain) Aitana Bonmatí**	**(Spain) Barcelona**	**202**
2023	2nd	(Spain) Salma Paralluelo	(Spain) Barcelona	64
2023	3rd	(Australia) Sam Kerr	(England) Chelsea	59
2024	**1st**	**(Spain) Aitana Bonmatí**	**(Spain) Barcelona**	**232**
2024	2nd	(Spain) Salma Paralluelo	(Spain) Barcelona	53
2024	3rd	(Norway) Caroline Graham Hansen	(Spain) Barcelona	39
2025	**1st**	**(Spain) Aitana Bonmatí**	**(Spain) Barcelona**	**196**
2025	2nd	(England) Alessia Russo	(England) Arsenal	70
2025	3rd	(Spain) Mariona Caldentey	(England) Arsenal	55

=== Statistics ===
Winners (2020–present)
Player	Wins	Years
(Spain) Aitana Bonmatí	3	2023, 2024, 2025
(Spain) Alexia Putellas	2	2021, 2022
(Denmark) Pernille Harder	1	2020

Wins by club
Club	Total	Players
(Spain) Barcelona	5	2
(England) Chelsea	1	1
(Germany) VfL Wolfsburg	1	1

Wins by nationality
Nationality	Total	Players
Spain	5	2
Denmark	1	1

=== Continental rankings ===
Bold indicates the World's Best Woman Player winner.

Year	Confederation	Winner	Club(s)
2020	**UEFA**	**(Denmark) Pernille Harder**	**(Germany) VfL Wolfsburg** **(England) Chelsea**
2020	CONMEBOL	(Brazil) Marta	(United States) Orlando Pride
2020	CONCACAF	(United States) Tobin Heath	**(England)** Manchester United
2020	CAF	(Nigeria) Asisat Oshoala	(Spain) Barcelona
2020	AFC	(Japan) Saki Kumagai	(France) Lyon
2020	OFC	(New Zealand) Rebekah Stott	(Australia) Melbourne City
2021	**UEFA**	**(Spain) Alexia Putellas**	**(Spain) Barcelona**
2021	CONMEBOL	(Brazil) Marta	(United States) Orlando Pride
2021	CONCACAF	(United States) Sam Mewis	(England) Manchester City (United States) North Carolina Courage
2021	CAF	(Nigeria) Asisat Oshoala	(Spain) Barcelona
2021	AFC	(Australia) Sam Kerr	(England) Chelsea
2021	OFC	(New Zealand) Ria Percival	(England) Tottenham Hotspur
2022	**UEFA**	**(Spain) Alexia Putellas**	**(Spain) Barcelona**
2022	CONMEBOL	(Colombia) Linda Caicedo	(Colombia) Deportivo Cali
2022	CONCACAF	(United States) Alex Morgan	(United States) San Diego Wave
2022	CAF	(Morocco) Ghizlane Chebbak	(Morocco) AS FAR
2022	AFC	(Australia) Sam Kerr	(England) Chelsea
2022	OFC	(New Zealand) Claudia Bunge	(Australia) Melbourne Victory (Australia) Northern Tigers

=== Women's Historical All-time World Best Players ===
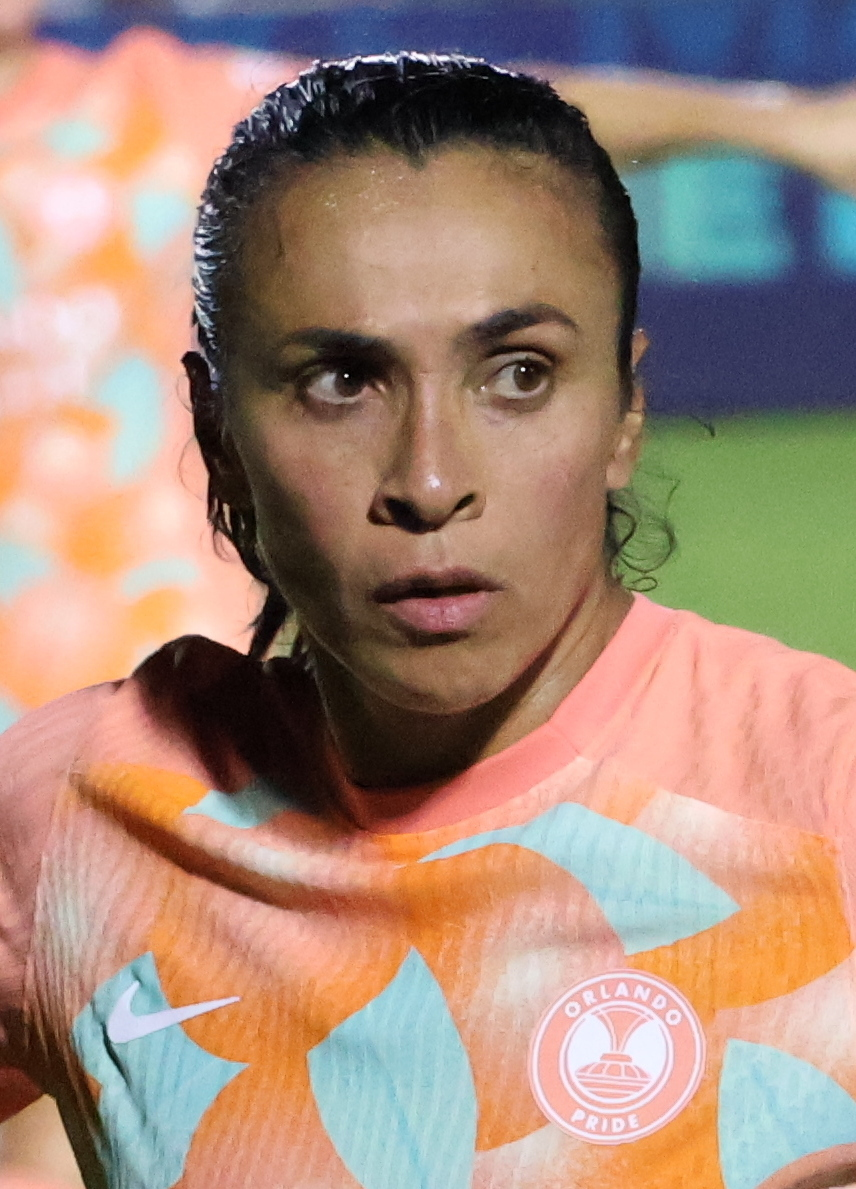
Marta, All-time Women's World Best Player

Top 10 players
Rank	Player	Nationality
**1**	**Marta**	**Brazil**
2	Mia Hamm	United States
3	Christine Sinclair	Canada
4	Kristine Lilly	United States
5	Michelle Akers	United States
6	Sun Wen	China
7	Homare Sawa	Japan
8	Heidi Mohr	Germany
9	Birgit Prinz	Germany
10	Aitana Bonmatí	Spain

=== The World's Best Woman Player of the Century (1901–2000) ===
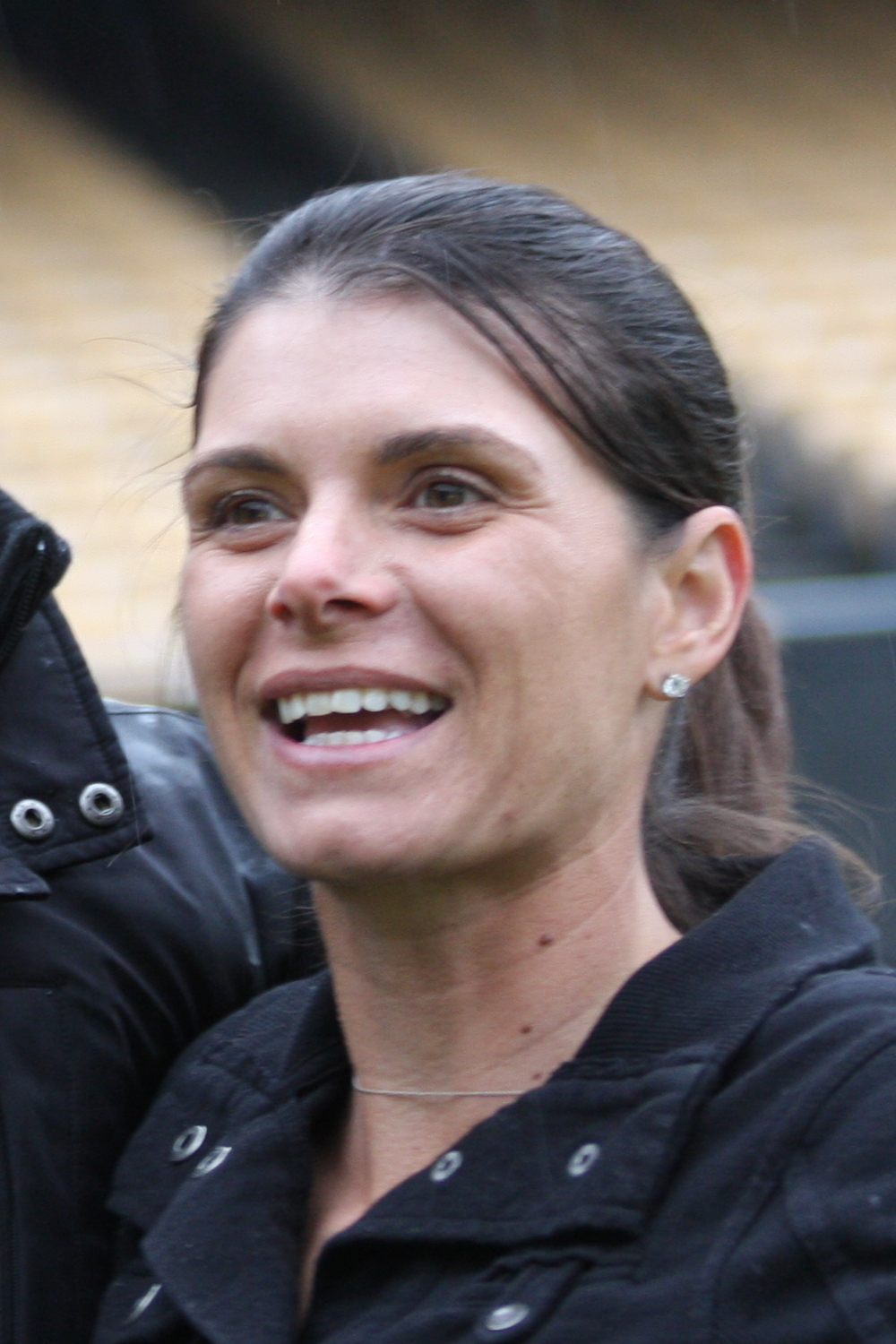
Mia Hamm, Female Player of the 20th Century

IFFHS gave out an award decided by votes which was conducted with the participation of journalists and former players (no further details given).

Top 10 players
Rank	Player	Nationality	Points
**1**	**Mia Hamm**	**United States**	**442**
2	Michelle Akers	United States	411
3	Heidi Mohr	Germany	250
4	Carolina Morace	Italy	230
5	Sissi	Brazil	212
6	Linda Medalen	Norway	181
7	Liu Ailing	China	165
8	Kristine Lilly	United States	160
9	Heidi Støre	Norway	141
10	Pia Sundhage	Sweden	129

=== The Best Woman Player of the Decade (2011–2020) ===
Confederation	First	Second	Third
World	(Brazil) Marta	(United States) Carli Lloyd	(Germany) Dzsenifer Marozsán
UEFA	(Germany) Dzsenifer Marozsán	(Norway) Ada Hegerberg	(France) Wendie Renard
CONMEBOL	(Brazil) Marta	(Brazil) Cristiane	(Brazil) Formiga
CONCACAF	(United States) Carli Lloyd	(United States) Alex Morgan	(United States) Megan Rapinoe
CAF	(Nigeria) Asisat Oshoala	(Cameroon) Gabrielle Onguéné	(Nigeria) Ngozi Okobi
AFC	(Japan) Homare Sawa	(Australia) Samantha Kerr	(Japan) Saki Kumagai
OFC	(New Zealand) Ria Percival	(New Zealand) Abby Erceg	(New Zealand) Rebekah Stott

=== Women Legends ===
Phase 1 (16 players)
Player	Nationality
Michelle Akers	United States
Gao Hong	China
Mia Hamm	United States
Steffi Jones	Germany
Kristine Lilly	United States
Liu Ailing	China
Linda Medalen	Norway
Heidi Mohr	Germany
Carolina Morace	Italy
Perpetua Nkwocha	Nigeria
Birgit Prinz	Germany
Homare Sawa	Japan
Sissi	Brazil
Heidi Støre	Norway
Pia Sundhage	Sweden
Abby Wambach	United States

Phase 2 (16 players)
Player	Nationality
Camille Abily	France
Nadine Angerer	Germany
Louisa Cadamuro	France
Julie Foudy	United States
Carin Jennings-Gabarra	United States
Nadine Keßler	Germany
Hanna Ljungberg	Sweden
Aya Miyama	Japan
Christie Rampone	United States
Hege Riise	Norway
Célia Šašić	Germany
Lotta Schelin	Sweden
Alex Scott	England
Kelly Smith	England
Hope Solo	United States
Sun Wen	China

Phase 3-A (8 players)
Player	Nationality
Alex Morgan	United States
Carli Lloyd	United States
Formiga	Brazil
Christine Sinclair	Canada
Megan Rapinoe	United States
Caroline Seger	Sweden
Janine van Wyk	South Africa
Julie Ertz	United States

=== The Women's Player of the Month ===
Month	Year	Player	Club	Ref.
January	2025	(Mexico) Charlyn Corral	(Mexico) Pachuca	
February	2025	(Australia) Mary Fowler	(England) Manchester City	
March	2025	(Sweden) Ellen Wangerheim	(Sweden) Hammarby	
April	2025	(Spain) Clàudia Pina	(Spain) Barcelona	
May	2025	(Netherlands) Jaimy Ravensbergen	(Netherlands) Twente	
June	2025	(Sweden) Felicia Schröder	(Sweden) Häcken	
July	2025	(England) Chloe Kelly	(England) Arsenal	
August	2025	(Mexico) Montserrat Saldívar	(Mexico) Club América	
September	2025	(Malawi) Temwa Chawinga	(United States) Kansas City Current	
October	2025	(Netherlands) Esmee Brugts	(Spain) Barcelona	
November	2025	(Japan) Momoko Tanikawa	(Germany) Bayern Munich	
December	2025	(Colombia) Linda Caicedo	(Spain) Real Madrid	
January	2026	(England) Carly Johns	(Scotland) Heart	
February	2026	(Brazil) Kerolin	(England) Manchester City	

== See also ==
- International Federation of Football History & Statistics
- IFFHS World's Best International Goal Scorer
- IFFHS World's Best Top Goal Scorer
- IFFHS World's Best National Coach
- IFFHS World's Best Club Coach
- IFFHS World's Best Goalkeeper
- IFFHS World's Best Club
- IFFHS World Team
