= IFFHS World's Best Top Goal Scorer =

Association football award

IFFHS World's Best Man Top Goal Scorer
- Sport: Association football
- Awarded for: Best goal scorer of the calendar year
- Presented by: International Federation of Football History & Statistics

History
- First award: 2011 (retroactive)
- Editions: 15
- First winner: (Portugal) Cristiano Ronaldo
- Most wins: (Portugal) Cristiano Ronaldo (5 awards)
- Most recent: (France) Kylian Mbappé (2nd award)
- Website: iffhs.com/en

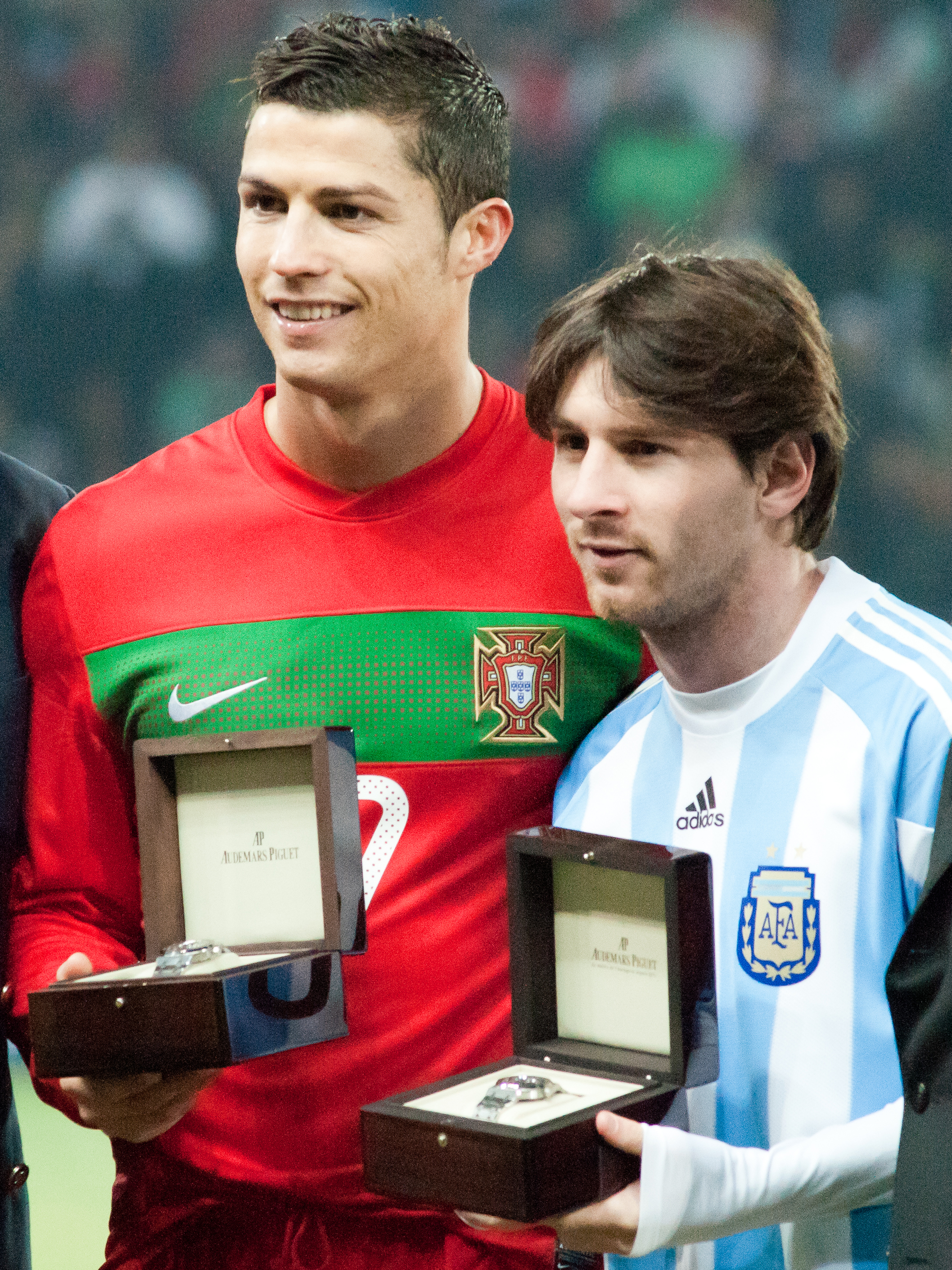
Cristiano Ronaldo (left) has won the most awards while Lionel Messi (right) set the record for most calendar year goals.

The IFFHS World's Best Top Goal Scorer is a football award given annually since 2020, and retroactively for the years 2011 to 2019, to the world's top goalscorer in the calendar year. The award is given by the International Federation of Football History & Statistics (IFFHS).

All international goals and all competitive goals for clubs playing in their country's top level division scored from 1 January to 31 December are taken into consideration.

Cristiano Ronaldo holds the record for most wins (5) while Lionel Messi holds the record for most goals in a calendar year (91 in 2012). Robert Lewandowski won the award with the fewest goals (47 in 2020).

Ronaldo (5), Messi (2), Lewandowski (2) and Kylian Mbappé (2) are the only players who have won the award more than once.

Ronaldo (Real Madrid and Al Nassr) and Mbappė (PSG and Real Madrid) are the only players to win the award with multiple clubs.

Meanwhile, Al Nassr (Abderrazak Hamdallah in 2019 and Ronaldo in 2023) & Real Madrid (Ronaldo in 2011, 2013, 2014, 2015 and Mbappė in 2025) are the only clubs with multiple winners.

In 2021, the IFFHS awarded the World's Best Goal Scorer of the first and second decade of the 21st century, considering the years 2001 to 2010 and 2011 to 2020.

== Men's winners ==
=== List of winners ===
Year	Rank	Player	Club(s)	Goals
2011	**1st**	**(Portugal) Cristiano Ronaldo**	**(Spain) Real Madrid**	**60**
2011	2nd	(Argentina) Lionel Messi	(Spain) FC Barcelona	59
2011	3rd	(Latvia) Aleksandrs Čekulajevs	(Estonia) Narva Trans	56
2012	**1st**	**(Argentina) Lionel Messi**	**(Spain) Barcelona**	**91**
2012	2nd	(Portugal) Cristiano Ronaldo	(Spain) Real Madrid	63
2012	3rd	(Brazil) Neymar	(Brazil) Santos	55
2013	**1st**	**(Portugal) Cristiano Ronaldo**	**(Spain) Real Madrid**	**69**
2013	2nd	(Maldives) Ali Ashfaq	(Maldives) New Radiant	58
2013	3rd	(Sweden) Zlatan Ibrahimović	(France) Paris Saint-Germain	47
2014	**1st**	**(Portugal) Cristiano Ronaldo**	**(Spain) Real Madrid**	**61**
2014	2nd	(Argentina) Lionel Messi	(Spain) Barcelona	58
2014	3rd	(Spain) Jonathan Soriano	(Austria) Red Bull Salzburg	55
2015	**1st**	**(Portugal) Cristiano Ronaldo**	**(Spain) Real Madrid**	**57**
2015	2nd	(Argentina) Lionel Messi	(Spain) Barcelona	52
2015	3rd	(Poland) Robert Lewandowski	(Germany) Bayern Munich	49
2016	**1st**	**(Argentina) Lionel Messi**	**(Spain) Barcelona**	**58**
2016	2nd	(Portugal) Cristiano Ronaldo	(Spain) Real Madrid	55
2016	3rd	(Uruguay) Luis Suárez	(Spain) Barcelona	51
2017	**1st**	**(England) Harry Kane**	**(England) Tottenham Hotspur**	**56**
2017	2nd	(Argentina) Lionel Messi	(Spain) Barcelona	54
2017	3rd	(Portugal) Cristiano Ronaldo	(Spain) Real Madrid	53
2018	**1st**	**(Algeria) Baghdad Bounedjah**	**(Qatar) Al-Sadd**	**58**
2018	2nd	(Argentina) Lionel Messi	(Spain) Barcelona	51
2018	3rd	(Portugal) Cristiano Ronaldo	(Spain) Real Madrid (Italy) Juventus	49
2019	**1st**	**(Morocco) Abderrazak Hamdallah**	**(Saudi Arabia) Al Nassr**	**57**
2019	2nd	(Poland) Robert Lewandowski	(Germany) Bayern Munich	54
2019	3rd	(Argentina) Lionel Messi	(Spain) Barcelona	50
2020	**1st**	**(Poland) Robert Lewandowski**	**(Germany) Bayern Munich**	**47**
2020	2nd	(Portugal) Cristiano Ronaldo	(Italy) Juventus	44
2020	3rd	(Belgium) Romelu Lukaku	(Italy) Inter Milan	40
2021	**1st**	**(Poland) Robert Lewandowski**	**(Germany) Bayern Munich**	**69**
2021	2nd	(France) Kylian Mbappé	(France) Paris Saint-Germain	51
2021	3rd	(Norway) Erling Haaland	(Germany) Borussia Dortmund	49
2022	**1st**	**(France) Kylian Mbappé**	**(France) Paris Saint-Germain**	**56**
2022	2nd	(Norway) Erling Haaland	(Germany) Borussia Dortmund (England) Manchester City	46
2022	3rd	(Brazil) Bergson	(Malaysia) Johor Darul Ta'zim	46
2023	**1st**	**(Portugal) Cristiano Ronaldo**	**(Saudi Arabia) Al Nassr**	**54**
2023	2nd	(France) Kylian Mbappé	(France) Paris Saint-Germain	52
2023	3rd	(England) Harry Kane	(England) Tottenham Hotspur (Germany) Bayern Munich	52
2024	**1st**	**(Sweden) Viktor Gyökeres**	**(Portugal) Sporting CP**	**62**
2024	2nd	(Norway) Erling Haaland	(England) Manchester City	49
2024	3rd	(England) Harry Kane	(Germany) Bayern Munich	46
2025	**1st**	**(France) Kylian Mbappé**	**(Spain) Real Madrid**	**66**
2025	2nd	(England) Harry Kane	(Germany) Bayern Munich	60
2025	3rd	(Norway) Erling Haaland	(England) Manchester City	57

=== Statistics ===
Winners (2011–present)
Player	Wins	Years
(Portugal) Cristiano Ronaldo	5	2011, 2013, 2014, 2015, 2023
(Argentina) Lionel Messi	2	2012, 2016
(Poland) Robert Lewandowski	2	2020, 2021
(France) Kylian Mbappé	2	2022, 2025
(England) Harry Kane	1	2017
(Algeria) Baghdad Bounedjah	1	2018
(Morocco) Abderrazak Hamdallah	1	2019
(Sweden) Viktor Gyökeres	1	2024

Most goals in a year
Rank	Player	Year	Goals
1	(Argentina) Lionel Messi	2012	91
2	(Portugal) Cristiano Ronaldo	2013	69
2	(Poland) Robert Lewandowski	2021	69
4	(France) Kylian Mbappé	2025	66
5	(Portugal) Cristiano Ronaldo	2012	63
6	(Sweden) Viktor Gyökeres	2024	62
7	(Portugal) Cristiano Ronaldo	2014	61
8	(Portugal) Cristiano Ronaldo	2011	60
8	(England) Harry Kane	2025	60

Wins by club
Club	Total	Players
(Spain) Real Madrid	5	2
(Saudi Arabia) Al Nassr	2	2
(Spain) Barcelona	2	1
(Germany) Bayern Munich	2	1
(Qatar) Al Sadd	1	1
(France) Paris Saint-Germain	1	1
(England) Tottenham Hotspur	1	1
(Portugal) Sporting CP	1	1

Wins by nationality
Nationality	Total	Players
Portugal	5	1
Argentina	2	1
France	2	1
Poland	2	1
Algeria	1	1
England	1	1
Morocco	1	1
Sweden	1	1

=== The World's Best Top Goal Scorer of the First Decade (2001–2010) ===
The final list includes the 32 players who scored 200 or more goals in top-tier national leagues, national cups, continental and international competitions with both club and national teams in the period of time from 1 January 2001 to 31 December 2010.

The results were posted on the IFFHS' official website on 25 September 2022.

Players with at least 250 goals
Rank	Player	Nation	Club(s)	Goals for country	Goals for club(s)	Total goals
1	Aleksandar Đurić	Singapore	Geylang United; Singapore Armed Forces; Tampines Rovers	16	311	327
2	Washington	Brazil	(Brazil) Ponte Preta (Turkey) Fenerbahçe (Brazil) Athletico Paranaense (Japan) Tokyo Verdy (Japan) Urawa Red Diamonds (Brazil) Fluminense (Brazil) São Paulo	2	281	283
3	Thierry Henry	France	(England) Arsenal (Spain) Barcelona (United States) New York Red Bulls	43	238	281
4	Ruud van Nistelrooy	Netherlands	(Netherlands) PSV Eindhoven (England) Manchester United (Spain) Real Madrid (Germany) Hamburger SV	33	242	275
5	Samuel Eto'o	Cameroon	(Spain) Mallorca (Spain) Barcelona (Italy) Inter Milan	44	227	271
6	Marc Lloyd Williams	Wales	(Wales) Bangor City (England) Southport (Wales) Aberystwyth Town (Wales) Total Network Solution (Wales) Rhyl (Wales) Newtown (Wales) Porthmadog (Wales) Airbus UK Broughton	0	271	271

=== The World's Best Top Goal Scorer of the Second Decade (2011–2020) ===
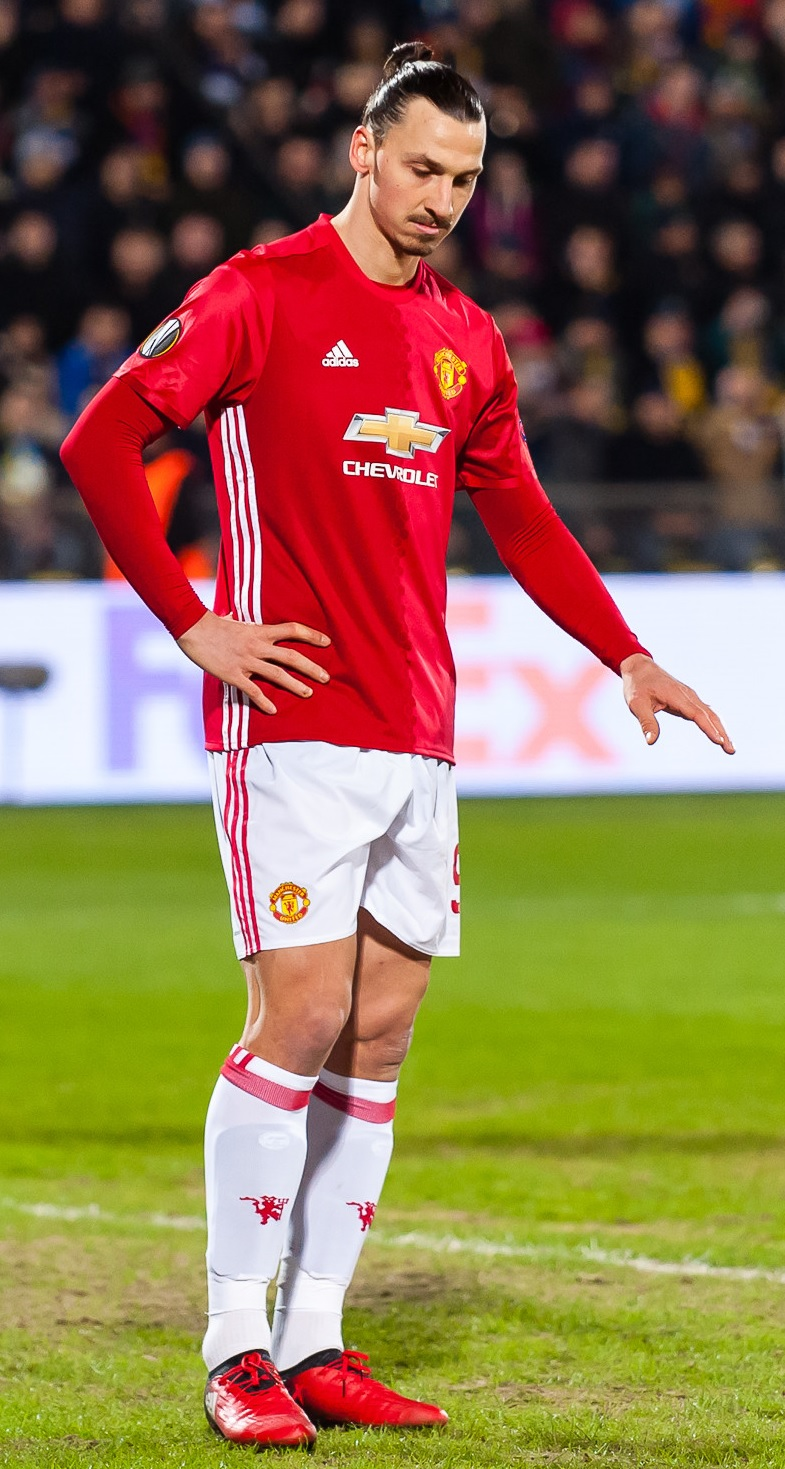
From 2011 to 2020, Zlatan Ibrahimović scored a total of 340 goals for club and country.

The final list includes the 41 players who scored 200 or more goals in top-tier national leagues, national cups, continental and international competitions with both club and national teams in the period of time from 1 January 2011 to 31 December 2020.

The results were posted on the IFFHS' official website on 4 January 2021.

Players with at least 250 goals
Rank	Player	Nation	Club(s)	Goals for country	Goals for club(s)	Total goals
1	Cristiano Ronaldo	Portugal	(Spain) Real Madrid (Italy) Juventus	77	473	550
2	Lionel Messi	Argentina	(Spain) Barcelona	56	493	549
3	Robert Lewandowski	Poland	(Germany) Borussia Dortmund (Germany) Bayern Munich	54	363	417
4	Zlatan Ibrahimović	Sweden	(Italy) Milan (France) Paris Saint-Germain (England) Manchester United (United States) LA Galaxy	37	303	340
5	Luis Suárez	Uruguay	(England) Liverpool (Spain) Barcelona (Spain) Atlético Madrid	47	288	335
6	Edinson Cavani	Uruguay	(Italy) Napoli (France) Paris Saint-Germain (England) Manchester United	43	291	334
7	Neymar (Note: In regards to Neymar's statistics during his spell at Santos (2011–2013), the IFFHS chose to consider the Campeonato Paulista (the top-flight league in the Brazilian state of São Paulo, of which Santos is a municipality) as a national league. As a result, the official stats for Neymar include goals scored in two different Brazilian leagues: the Campeonato Paulista and the Brasileirão.)	Brazil	(Brazil) Santos (Spain) Barcelona (France) Paris Saint-Germain	63	264	327
8	Sergio Agüero	Argentina	(Spain) Atlético Madrid (England) Manchester City	32	270	302
9	Pierre-Emerick Aubameyang (Note: As the statistics are calculated starting from 1 January 2011, two goals from Aubameyang's loan spell at Monaco (from Milan) in the first half of the 2010–11 season are left out of the total amount. The Gabonese striker joined Saint-Étienne in January 2011 on another loan, and eventually signed for the French team on a permanent deal the following December.)	Gabon	(France) Saint-Étienne (Germany) Borussia Dortmund (England) Arsenal	21	257	278
10	Sebastián Tagliabúe	United Arab Emirates	(Saudi Arabia) Ettifaq (Saudi Arabia) Al-Shabab (United Arab Emirates) Al-Wahda (United Arab Emirates) Al-Nasr	1	264	265
11	Eran Zahavi	Israel	(Israel) Hapoel Tel Aviv (Italy) Palermo (Israel) Maccabi Tel Aviv (China) Guangzhou R&F (Netherlands) PSV Eindhoven	24	240	264
12	Karim Benzema	France	(Spain) Real Madrid	16	243	259
13	Romelu Lukaku (Note: Lukaku was registered for Chelsea between 2011 and 2014, but he never scored during his first season with the club and was loaned, respectively, to West Bromwich Albion and Everton (which eventually signed him permanently) during the following couple of years.)	Belgium	(Belgium) Anderlecht (England) West Bromwich Albion (England) Everton (England) Manchester United (Italy) Inter Milan	55	203	258
14	Omar Al Somah	Syria	(Syria) Al Futowa (Kuwait) Al Qadsia (Saudi Arabia) Al Ahli	15	240	255
15	Ali Mabkhout	United Arab Emirates	(United Arab Emirates) Al-Jazira	65	185	250

=== The World's Best Top Goal Scorer of the Third Decade (2021–2030) ===
The provisional results were posted on the IFFHS' official website on 4 February 2026.

Players with at least 200 goals
Rank	Player	Nation	Club(s)	Goals for country	Goals for club(s)	Total goals
1	Kylian Mbappé	France	(France) Paris Saint-Germain (Spain) Real Madrid	39	225	**264**
2	Erling Haaland	Norway	(Germany) Borussia Dortmund (England) Manchester City	49	202	**251**
3	Harry Kane	England	(England) Tottenham Hotspur (Germany) Bayern Munich	46	191	**237**
4	Robert Lewandowski	Poland	(Germany) Bayern Munich (Spain) Barcelona	25	187	**212**
5	Cristiano Ronaldo	Portugal	(Italy) Juventus (England) Manchester United (Saudi Arabia) Al Nassr	41	160	**201**

=== All-time World's Best Goal Scorer ranking ===
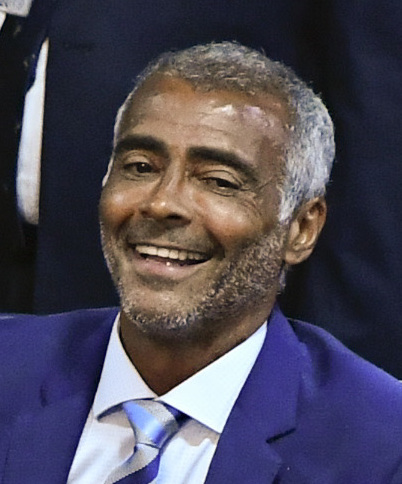
Romário ranks 4th in the All-time World's Best Goal Scorer ranking with 756 goals.

As of 2 November 2024
Bold indicates players currently active.
* indicates player has scored at least 500 goals for a single club.

Players with at least 500 goals
Rank	Player	League	Cup	Continental	Country & other	Total	Years
1	(Portugal) **Cristiano Ronaldo**	556	56	168	135	960	2002–present
2	(Argentina) **Lionel Messi***	517	71	149	112	849	2004–present
3	(Brazil) Pelé*	604	49	26	83	762	1957–1977
4	(Brazil) Romário	545	93	54	64	756	1985–2007
5	(Hungary) Ferenc Puskás	516	69	56	84	725	1943–1966
6	(Austria) (Czechoslovakia) Josef Bican*	515	137	38	32	722	1931–1955
7	**(Poland) Robert Lewandowski**	400	57	107	84	648	2008–present
8	(Northern Ireland) Jimmy Jones*	330	286	14	9	648	1947–1964
9	(Germany) Gerd Müller*	405	92	69	68	634	1964–1981
10	(Ireland) Joe Bambrick*	347	253	5	21	626	1926–1943
11	(Netherlands) Abe Lenstra	573	18	0	33	624	1936–1963
12	**(Uruguay) Luis Suárez**	409	48	57	69	583	2005–present
13	(Portugal) Eusébio	381	97	59	41	578	1960–1978
14	(Northern Ireland) Glenn Ferguson	313	241	9	0	563	1987–2011
15	(Sweden) Zlatan Ibrahimović	394	48	57	62	561	1999–2023
16	(Hungary) Imre Schlosser	413	68	13	59	553	1906–1928
17	(Portugal) Fernando Peyroteo*	464	72	3	14	553	1937–1949
18	(Germany) Uwe Seeler*	447	41	21	43	552	1954–1978
19	(Scotland) Jimmy McGrory*	407	131	0	12	550	1923–1937
20	(Argentina) (Spain) Alfredo Di Stéfano	378	54	76	29	537	1945–1966
21	(Hungary) György Sárosi	350	35	103	42	530	1931–1948
22	(Brazil) Roberto Dinamite	476	10	5	22	513	1971–1992
23	(Mexico) Hugo Sánchez	390	49	38	30	507	1976–1997
24	(Austria) Franz Binder	297	93	87	26	503	1930–1949
25	(Brazil) Zico	410	27	16	48	501	1971–1994

== Women's winners ==
IFFHS World's Best Woman Top Goal Scorer
- Sport: Association football
- Awarded for: Best goal scorer of the calendar year
- Presented by: International Federation of Football History & Statistics

History
- First award: 2021
- Editions: 5
- First winner: (Spain) Jennifer Hermoso
- Most wins: (Mexico) Charlyn Corral (2 awards)
- Most recent: (Mexico) Charlyn Corral (2nd award)
- Website: iffhs.com/en

=== List of winners ===
Year	Rank	Player	Club(s)	Goals
2021	1st	(Spain) Jennifer Hermoso	(Spain) Barcelona	48
2021	2nd	(Germany) Lea Schüller	(Germany) Bayern Munich	47
2021	3rd	(Spain) Alexia Putellas	(Spain) Barcelona	43
2022	1st	(Netherlands) Fenna Kalma	(Netherlands) Twente	45
2022	2nd	(Australia) Sam Kerr	(England) Chelsea	38
2022	3rd	(Belgium) Tessa Wullaert	(Belgium) Anderlecht (Netherlands) Fortuna Sittard	38
2023	1st	(Malawi) Temwa Chawinga	(China) Wuhan Jiangda	63
2023	2nd	(Mexico) Charlyn Corral	(Mexico) Pachuca	39
2023	3rd	(Mexico) Kiana Palacios	(Mexico) América	38
2024	1st	(Mexico) Charlyn Corral	(Mexico) Pachuca	44
2024	2nd	(Norway) Caroline Graham Hansen	(Spain) Barcelona	36
2024	3rd	(Poland) Ewa Pajor	(Germany) Wolfsburg (Spain) Barcelona	35
2025	1st	(Mexico) Charlyn Corral	(Mexico) Pachuca	57
2025	2nd	(Poland) Ewa Pajor	(Spain) Barcelona	45
2025	3rd	(England) Katie Wilkinson	(Scotland) Rangers	42

=== Statistics ===
Winners (2021–present)
Player	Wins	Years
(Mexico) Charlyn Corral	2	2024, 2025
(Spain) Jennifer Hermoso	1	2021
(Netherlands) Fenna Kalma	1	2022
(Malawi) Temwa Chawinga	1	2023

Most goals in a year
Rank	Player	Year	Goals
1	(Malawi) Temwa Chawinga	2023	63
2	(Mexico) Charlyn Corral	2025	57
3	(Spain) Jennifer Hermoso	2021	48
4	(Germany) Lea Schüller	2021	47
5	(Netherlands) Fenna Kalma	2022	45
5	(Poland) Ewa Pajor	2025	45
7	(Mexico) Charlyn Corral	2024	44
8	(Spain) Alexia Putellas	2021	43
9	(England) Katie Wilkinson	2025	42
10	(Mexico) Charlyn Corral	2023	39
11	(Australia) Sam Kerr	2022	38
11	(Belgium) Tessa Wullaert	2022	38

Wins by club
Club	Total	Players
(Mexico) Pachuca	2	1
(Spain) Barcelona	1	1
(Netherlands) Twente	1	1
(China) Wuhan Jiangda	1	1

Wins by nationality
Nationality	Total	Players
Mexico	2	1
Malawi	1	1
Netherlands	1	1
Spain	1	1

== See also ==
- International Federation of Football History & Statistics
- IFFHS World's Best International Goal Scorer
- IFFHS World's Best National Coach
- IFFHS World's Best Club Coach
- IFFHS World's Best Goalkeeper
- IFFHS World's Best Player
- IFFHS World's Best Club
- IFFHS World Team
