= Ultimate Beastmaster season 3 =

Season American competition reality television show Ultimate Beastmaster

Ultimate Beastmaster
- Season 3
- No. of contestants: 54
- Finals venue: Santa Clarita, California
- No. of episodes: 9

Release
- Original network: Netflix
- Original release: August 31, 2018

Season chronology
- ← Previous; Season 2

The third season of the American reality competition series Ultimate Beastmaster premiered exclusively via Netflix's web streaming service on August 31, 2018. The show consists of 9 Beastmaster episodes which were released simultaneously on Netflix worldwide.

== Hosts ==
Each country has their own set of two hosts/commentators for the competition. They are as follows:

| Country | Host | |
|---|---|---|
| United States | Tiki Barber | Former NFL Player |
| United States | CM Punk | MMA Fighter/Former WWE Champion |
| Brazil | Rafinha Bastos | Comedian |
| Brazil | Anderson Silva | UFC Fighter |
| Germany | Micky Beisenherz | Radio and TV host |
| Germany | Jeannine Michaelsen | Actress |
| Mexico | Luis Ernesto Franco | Telenovela Star |
| Mexico | Ines Sainz | Sports Broadcaster |
| South Korea | Seo Kyung Suk | Radio/TV Personality |
| South Korea | Park Kyeong Rim | Radio/TV Personality |
| France | Gilles Marini | Actor |
| France | Sandy Heribert | Sports Journalist |
| Italy | Francesco Facchinetti | DJ/Television Host |
| Italy | Bianca Balti | Model |
| United Kingdom | Stu Bennett | Professional Wrestler |
| United Kingdom | Kate Abdo | Sports Journalist |
| Australia | Dannii Minogue | TV Personality/Singer |
| Australia | Nick Cummins | Former Rugby Star |

Not only do each pair of hosts provide color commentary for each of the nine localized versions, but the foreign commentators also make appearances in each localized version, with their commentary presented by subtitles. If a contestant completes a course, all hosts' reactions are shown on screen. Furthermore, since all host booths are placed, this year, in a circular row on the Ultimate Beastmaster set, commentators from one localization can easily walk over into the booth of another localized version.

== The Beast ==
The obstacle course for the competition is known as The Beast, and it is divided into 3 Levels. Level 4 has been added to the Beast for the Finals. Competitors with the highest scores after each level move on while those with the lowest scores are eliminated, with ties decided in favor of the competitor with the lowest time. Unlike the first season (where scores reset on Level 4) and the previous season (where scores accrue on all four levels), all scores reset at the start of the level. The obstacles are suspended over a body of red-tinted water referred to as Beast Blood (except for Level 3 which has blue(sometimes regular)-tinted water and is referred to as the Fuel of the Pyramid) and housed in a giant steel frame that takes the form of a large animal. A competitor is considered to have failed a Level if all four limbs are submerged into the Beast Blood/Fuel of the Pyramid. Failure ends the attempt at the current Level but confers no penalties.

This season, the same LED triangle from Season 2 is the form of the Point Thrusters, but meanwhile in addition to the normal Point Thrusters, a new Mega Thruster has been added, which counts down from 50 at varying speeds, giving the competitors a certain number of points, depending on how fast they hit the Thruster. In addition, a final Point Thruster worth 25 points has been added to the end of every level. Mega Thrusters have replaced the Energy Taps in Level 4, and in this level the points are only accessible with these, each being increased by 250 points than the other.

This season also features a tournament-style bracket, in which two athletes advance from each episode to a semifinal round then to a final round, earning themselves $10,000, where they fight for the title of Ultimate Beastmaster and $50,000. In the semifinals, the top 6 competitors compete, with the top 3 winning $10,000 and moving on to the finals. Competitors must run the entire course (Levels 1-3) in one go and get the farthest the fastest. If they fail once, they are given an extra life they can use to try again from one of five checkpoints throughout the course, but at the cost of the points accrued after crossing the checkpoint. Should the competitor choose not to use it, however, the extra life is then forfeited and cannot be used later.

=== Level 1 ===
In Level 1 all nine competitors compete with the top six scorers moving on.

- Lockjaw - Competitors must scale a pole that gets as thin as 8 in. as competitors progress.
- Gear Head - Competitors must cross two gear-like platforms shaped similarly to the Grinders from Season 2. The first one is stationary while the second swings back-and-forth.
- Faceplant - Competitors stand on a narrow platform, hands braced against panels on either side, as they are tilted forward to a 45° angle. They must then jump to a chain and swing to the next obstacle. The first Point Thruster is located higher up the chain. Unlike previous seasons, the chain is positioned towards the side a bit. This is the first of five checkpoints in the Semifinals.
- Hyper Jump - Competitors must jump across approximately 4 semi-stationary hanging platforms that start moving once the competitor lands on them. A Point Thruster is located between the platforms.

At the end of Hyper Jump, there are two different paths taken, often with interchangeable obstacles, depending on the episode.

Path 1

- The Rack - Competitors must jump across a series of 2 seesaws. A Point Thruster is located in between each seesaw. Interchangeable with Rope Burn or the Dead Bolts; replaced with Break Neck for the Semifinals.
- Rope Burn - Competitors must use a rope to scale a giant tube that gets wider midway through. A Point Thruster is located just before the tube gets wider. Interchangeable with The Rack or the Dead Bolts; replaced with Break Neck for the Semifinals.
- Dead Bolts - Competitors must jump across a series of 4 semi-stationary hanging bolts, each at a slightly different angle; the last two are placed 6 ft. apart from each other. A Point Thruster is located between the second and third Deadbolts while a Mega Thruster is located between the last two Deadbolts. Interchangeable with The Rack or Rope Burn; replaced with Break Neck for the Semifinals.
- Break Neck - Competitors must cross a series of 3 wheels, two of which spin automatically while the second one is stationary, each with 6 pistons, two at the least of which drops down. Exclusive to the Semifinals.
- Chain Drive - Competitors must cross a series of 3 spinning gears, two counter-clockwise and the second clockwise, with 4 dangling pole-ropes. Exclusive to the Finals.
- Mag Wall - Competitors navigate horizontally across a climbing wall. Every 2 seconds the magnetic handholds are released and fall into the Beast's blood. The wall features an inversion, from which the competitors must jump to the finishing platform. A Point Thruster is located toward the start of Mag Wall while a Mega Thruster is located towards the end of the wall.

Path 2

- Wheel Power - Competitors must use their momentum to turn a rolling beam with monkey bars. Interchangeable with Rib Cage Row or Crank Shaft.
- Rib Cage Row - Competitors must swing across 4 sets of bars, the distance between each set as far as 9 ft. the farther competitors go. Interchangeable with Wheel Power or Crank Shaft.
- Crank Shaft - Competitors must cross a rotating beam with 6 heptagonal-platforms. Interchangeable with Wheel Power or Rib Cage Row.
- Crash Pads - Similar to the Bungee Beds from season 1's Level 3, competitors must traverse two unstable platforms suspended at varying heights by bungee chords. A Point Thruster is located near the first Crash Pad while a Mega Thruster is located near the second one.

Each individual portion of an obstacle is worth 5 points.

=== Level 2 ===
In Level 2 the top six competitors compete, with the top four scorers moving on. Similar to Season 1, some obstacles interchange with each other.Many obstacles i.e.Stomach Churn and Spinal Descent have been swapped with new obstacles, but unlike other seasons, now the obstacles swap places during the Semifinals and Finals.

- Drop Zone - Competitors must scale an angled-trampoline to a blue ramp, but they should jump on the Beastmaster logo while facing the trampoline than anything else for more balance. A Point Thruster is located near the base of the ramp. This is the second of five checkpoints for the Semifinals.
- Pivot Point - Competitors must jump from the ramp to a hexagonal-platform near the base of Digestive Track. The drop is said to be 10 ft down. This is the third of five checkpoints for the Semifinals.
- Digestive Track - Jumping from the last spinning platform into a tube, competitors must climb the tube before it sinks and jump to the next obstacle.
- Dreadmills - Competitors must cross a pair of suspended treadmills and leap to a platform. A Point Thruster is located after the second Dreadmill.
- Shape Shifter - Competitors must cross a 30 ft. series of octagonal-footholds. A Point Thruster is located midway across, while a Mega Thruster is located near the end. Replaced with the Sidewinder for the Semifinals and Destabilizer for the Finals.
- Sidewinder - Competitors must cross a series of two bent pipes while hanging on to wheels. A Point Thruster is located midway across. This is the fourth of five checkpoints for the Semifinals. Exclusive to the Semifinals. Replaced with Destabilizer for the Finals.
- Destabilizer - Competitors must jump across a series of three beams suspended by Bungee Cords and placed at different angles. Exclusive to the Finals.
- Tail Whip - Competitors must scale a series of monkey bars set 3 ft apart and can fall at any time. A Point Thruster is located midway across with a Mega Thruster located towards the right.

Each individual portion of an obstacle is worth 5 points.

=== Level 3 ===
In Level 3, also known as the Energy Pyramid, the top 4 scorers compete, with the top 2 advancing to the Semifinals (3 moving on to Level 4 for the Finals).

- Rail Runner - Competitors must mount a forward-moving treadmill and attempt to grab a suspended a pole-rope (or a regular black rope in some episodes) as it swings through a curved track, then reach for an additional pole-rope/rope located just before Power Surge. 3 Point Thrusters are located at the beginning, middle, and end of the track. This is the last of five checkpoints for the Semifinals.
- Power Surge - Competitors must work their way through three tubes structure made of pipe and chain before they each sink into the water. The first is placed vertically while the rest is shaped similarly to the previous seasons' Coil Crawl. In contrast to the previous seasons', the last ring only sinks occasionally. A Mega Thruster is located midway through.
- Viper Climb- Competitors must scale an 80 ft helix. A Point Thruster is located 3/4ths of the way up.
- Pipeline - Competitors must use grip handles to slide up a set of V-shaped bars.
- Climbing Wall - Competitors must climb a wall up to the final platform. A Mega Thruster is located at the bottom of the wall.

Individual portions of obstacles are worth 5 points.

=== Level 4 ===
In Level 4 the top 3 finalists compete on an 80 ft climbing wall, with the top 1 winning $50,000 and being crowned the Ultimate Beastmaster. Unlike the previous seasons, this level is exclusive to the Finals, and competitors each compete one-at-a-time. Points can only be attained through three Mega Thrusters placed throughout, each worth 250 points more than the previous Thruster.

- Ricochet - Competitors navigate back-and-forth between 2 walls, each transfer when grip is worn out.

At the end of Ricochet, competitors must make a choice between two paths.

- Full Tilt - Competitors must scale six blocks with two handholds which tilt down as they grab them.
- Drop Tank - Competitors must scale three platforms which drop down 18 in. as they step on them.
- Mother Board - Competitors must ascend a large pegboard. The first Mega Thruster (worth 250 points) is located towards the bottom of the board.

At the end of Mother Board, competitors must make a choice between another two paths.

- Razor's Edge - Competitors must cross a shaky bridge made up of trapezoidal platforms.
- Vertigo - Competitors must scale a swirling beam.
- Ventilator - Competitors must ascend in one of three ways:
  - Rope Climb - A narrow vertical crevice with a rope positioned left.
  - I-Beam Cross - A narrow beam positioned right in the middle that gets thinner as competitors climb up.
    - The second Mega Thruster (worth 500 points) is located at the bottom of the I-Beam.
  - Chimney Climb - A narrow vertical crevice positioned right.
    - The final Mega Thruster (worth 750 points) is located at the top of Ventilator.

Competitors are given unlimited time to accrue the highest possible score, with ties decided in favor of the competitor who finished the fastest. There is no failure condition for Level 4, and competitors may attempt to regain their footing if they lose grip on the wall.

== Episodes ==
The contestant was in the semifinals and finals.
The contestants completed that level.
The contestant was eliminated on that round.

=== Episode 1: The Beast Evolves ===
==== Competitors ====
- Max Sprenger, 22 Media and Computer Science Student - Team Germany - Semifinalist
- James Drake, 36 Non-Profit Director - Team USA - Semifinalist
- Javier Lopez, 21 Gymnast - Team Mexico - Eliminated on Level 3
- Sung Hyuk Choi, 36 Pole Dancer - Team South Korea - Eliminated on Level 3
- Nathan Caparros, 24 Climbing Instructor - Team France - Eliminated on Level 2
- Gareth Leah, 30 Travel Writer - Team UK - Eliminated on Level 2
- Edoardo Bocchio Vega, 23 Environmental Policy Student - Team Italy - Eliminated on Level 1
- Morgan-Rose Moroney, 20 Physiotherapy Student - Team Australia - Eliminated on Level 1
- Mauro Yoshida, 29 Gym Owner - Team Brazil - Eliminated on Level 1

==== Level 1 ====
Level 1 Configuration: Lockjaw, Gear Head, Faceplant, Hyper Jump, The Rack, Mag Wall

| Competitor | Points | Time | Finish | Result |
|---|---|---|---|---|
| (Germany) Max Sprenger | 131 | 2:36 | 1st | Completed Level 1 |
| (France) Nathan Caparros | 129 | 3:31 | 2nd | Completed Level 1 |
| (United States) James Drake | 70 | 3:14 | 3rd | Fell on the Mag Wall |
| (Mexico) Javier Lopez | 65 | 2:26 | 4th | Fell on The Mag Wall |
| (United Kingdom) Gareth Leah | 60 | 2:07 | 5th | Missed the Jump to the Mag Wall |
| (South Korea) Sung Hyuk Choi | 45 | 2:33 | 6th | Fell on The Rack |
| (Italy) Edoardo Bocchio Vega | 35 | 1:30 | 7th | Fell on The Rack |
| (Australia) Morgan-Rose Moroney | 30 | 1:46 | 8th | Missed the jump to The Rack |
| (Brazil) Mauro Yoshida | 10 | 0:24 | 8th | Missed the jump off Gear Head |

==== Level 2 ====
| Competitor | Points | Time | Finish | Result |
|---|---|---|---|---|
| (Germany) Max Sprenger | 112 | 4:17 | 1st | Completed Level 2 |
| (Mexico) Javier Lopez | 95 | 4:50 | 2nd | Completed Level 2 |
| (South Korea) Sung Hyuk Choi | 25 | 1:06 | 3rd | Missed the jump off the Dreadmills |
| (United States) James Drake | 25 | 1:23 | 4th | Missed the jump off the Dreadmills |
| (France) Nathan Caparros | 25 | 2:55 | 5th | Missed the Jump off the Dreadmills |
| (United Kingdom) Gareth Leah | 20 | 1:02 | 6th | Fell on the Dreadmills |

==== Level 3 ====
| Competitor | Points | Time | Finish | Result |
|---|---|---|---|---|
| (Germany) Max Sprenger | 80 | 2:44 | 1st | Fell on Viper Climb |
| (United States) James Drake | 75 | 3:42 | 2nd | Fell on Viper Climb |
| (Mexico) Javier Lopez | 20 | 0:42 | 3rd | Fell on Rail Runner |
| (South Korea) Sung Hyuk Choi | 5 | 0:22 | 4th | Fell on Rail Runner |

=== Episode 2: Champions Collide ===
==== Competitors ====
- Jayden Irving, 26 Surfer - Team Australia - Semifinalist
- David Ferguson, 27 Professional Muay Thai Boxer - Team UK - Semifinalist
- Dre Nuzum, 23 Dance Instructor - Team USA - Eliminated on Level 3
- Matteo Curiel, 29 Personal Trainer - Team Italy - Eliminated on Level 3
- Gaël Le Moigne, 28 Renewable Energy Entrepreneur - Team France - Eliminated on Level 2
- Jessica Wielens, 30 Alternative Medicine Practitioner - Team Germany - Eliminated on Level 2
- Aida Alanis, 30 Gym Owner - Team Mexico - Eliminated on Level 1
- Jabee Kim, 31 Professional Climber - Team South Korea - Eliminated on Level 1
- Felipe Ho Foganholo, 18 Professional Climber - Team Brazil - Eliminated on Level 1

==== Level 1 ====
Level 1 Configuration: Lockjaw, Gear Head, Faceplant, Hyper Jump, Wheel Power, Crash Pads

Note: After Felipe Ho Foganholo missed the jump off Gear Head, Brazilian host Rafinha Bastos complained about this, risked his life trying it, and tested Australia if he could beat Felipe, but unfortunately failed the same way.

| Competitor | Points | Time | Finish | Result |
|---|---|---|---|---|
| (Australia) Jayden Irving | 80 | 2:54 | 1st | Completed Level 1 |
| (France) Gaël Le Moigne | 35 | 2:31 | 2nd | Fell on Wheel Power |
| (Italy) Matteo Curiel | 35 | 2:32 | 3rd | Fell on Wheel Power |
| (United Kingdom) David Ferguson | 35 | 2:40 | 4th | Voluntarily fell on Wheel Power |
| (Germany) Jessica Wielens | 30 | 2:01 | 5th | Fell on Wheel Power |
| (United States) Dre Nuzum | 20 | 1:05 | 6th | Fell on Faceplant |
| (Mexico) Aida Alanis | 15 | 1:09 | 7th | Fell on Faceplant |
| (South Korea) Jabee Kim | 10 | 1:08 | 8th | Missed the jump off Gear Head |
| (Brazil) Felipe Ho Foganholo | 10 | 1:09 | 9th | Missed the jump off Gear Head |

==== Level 2 ====
| Competitor | Points | Time | Finish | Result |
|---|---|---|---|---|
| (United States) Dre Nuzum | 35 | 2:28 | 1st | Missed the jump off the Dreadmills |
| (Australia) Jayden Irving | 25 | 0:49 | 2nd | Missed the jump to the Dreadmills |
| (Italy) Matteo Curiel | 25 | 1:09 | 3rd | Fell on the Dreadmills |
| (United Kingdom) David Ferguson | 25 | 1:11 | 4th | Missed the jump to the Dreadmills |
| (France) Gaël Le Moigne | 20 | 1:19 | 5th | Sunk in Digestive Track |
| (Germany) Jessica Wielens | 0 | 0:00 | 6th | Fell on Drop Zone |

==== Level 3 ====
| Competitor | Points | Time | Finish | Result |
|---|---|---|---|---|
| (Australia) Jayden Irving | 83 | 2:02 | 1st | Fell on Viper Climb |
| (United Kingdom) David Ferguson | 45 | 6:49 | 2nd | Voluntarily fell on Viper Climb |
| (United States) Dre Nuzum | 10 | 0:38 | 3rd | Fell on Rail Runner |
| (Italy) Matteo Curiel | 0 | 0:00 | 4th | Fell on Rail Runner |

=== Episode 3: Strive for Greatness ===
==== Competitors ====
- Keiha Dhruev, 23 Climbing Instructor - Team UK - Semifinalist
- Miguel Angel Hernandez, 35 Aerial Acrobat - Team Mexico - Semifinalist
- Elvis Gjeci, 23 Gymnastics Coach - Team Italy - Eliminated on Level 3
- Thomas Ballet, 28 Human Resources Consultant - Team France - Eliminated on Level 3
- Chloé Henry, 30 Pole Vaulter - Team USA - Eliminated on Level 2
- Jun Kim, 29 Photographer - Team Germany - Eliminated on Level 2
- Patricia Antunes Silva, 31 Chef - Team Brazil - Eliminated on Level 1
- David Georgiou, 30 Gym Owner - Team Australia - Eliminated on Level 1
- Nae Yun Yang, 26 Swimming Coach - Team South Korea - Eliminated on Level 1

==== Level 1 ====
Level 1 Configuration: Lockjaw, Gear Head, Faceplant, Hyper Jump, Rope Burn, Mag Wall

| Competitor | Points | Time | Finish | Result |
|---|---|---|---|---|
| (Italy) Elvis Gjeci | 35 | 1:47 | 1st | Fell on Rope Burn |
| (France) Thomas Ballet | 35 | 2:16 | 2nd | Fell on Rope Burn |
| (United Kingdom) Keiha Dhruev | 30 | 1:14 | 3rd | Missed the jump to Rope Burn |
| (Germany) Jun Kim | 15 | 0:21 | 4th | Fell on Faceplant |
| (Mexico) Miguel Angel Hernandez | 15 | 0:35 | 5th | Fell on Faceplant |
| (United States) Chloé Henry | 15 | 0:44 | 6th | Fell on Faceplant |
| (Brazil) Patricia Antunes Silva | 10 | 0:18 | 7th | Missed the jump off of Gear Head |
| (Australia) David Georgiou | 10 | 0:20 | 8th | Missed the jump off of Gear Head |
| (South Korea) Nae Yun Yang | 10 | 0:22 | 9th | Missed the jump off of Gear Head |

==== Level 2 ====
| Competitor | Points | Time | Finish | Result |
|---|---|---|---|---|
| (United Kingdom) Keiha Dhruev | 115 | 5:34 | 1st | Completed Level 2 |
| (France) Thomas Ballet | 25 | 0:44 | 2nd | Missed the jump to the Dreadmills |
| (Italy) Elvis Gjeci | 20 | 0:20 | 3rd | Fell out of Digestive Track |
| (Mexico) Miguel Angel Hernandez | 20 | 0:28 | 4th | Sunk in Digestive Track |
| (United States) Chloé Henry | 0 | 0:00 | 5th | Fell on Drop Zone |
| (Germany) Jun Kim | 0 | 0:00 | 6th | Fell on Drop Zone |

==== Level 3 ====
| Competitor | Points | Time | Finish | Result |
|---|---|---|---|---|
| (United Kingdom) Keiha Dhruev | 35 | Unk | 1st | Fell on Viper Climb |
| (Mexico) Miguel Angel Hernandez | 30 | 1:31 | 2nd | Fell on Power Surge |
| (Italy) Elvis Gjeci | 30 | 2:04 | 3rd | Sunk in Power Surge |
| (France) Thomas Ballet | 10 | 0:10 | 4th | Fell on Rail Runner |

=== Episode 4: Semifinal #1 ===
==== Competitors ====
- Jayden Irving, 26 Surfer - Team Australia - Episode 2 - Finalist
- Max Sprenger, 22 Media and Computer Science Student - Team Germany - Episode 1 - Finalist
- James Drake 36 Non-Profit Director - Team USA - Episode 1 - Finalist
- David Ferguson, 27 Muay Thai Boxer - Team UK - Episode 2 - Eliminated
- Keiha Dhruev, 23 Climbing Instructor - Team UK - Episode 3 - Eliminated
- Miguel Angel Hernandez, 35 Aerial Acrobat - Team Mexico - Episode 3 - Eliminated

Level 1 Configuration: Lockjaw, Gear Head, Faceplant, Hyper Jump, Break Neck, Mag Wall

| Competitor | Points | Time | Finish | Result |
|---|---|---|---|---|
| (Australia) Jayden Irving | 308 | 3:34 | 1st | Missed the jump to the Final Platform in Level 1 Fell on Viper Climb |
| (Germany) Max Sprenger | 147 | 3:15 | 2nd | Missed the jump off the Dreadmills; Missed the jump off the Dreadmills |
| (United States) James Drake | 75 | 2:57 | 3rd | Fell on the Mag Wall; Did Not Use Extra Life |
| (United Kingdom) David Ferguson | 55 | 2:15 | 4th | Fell on Break Neck; Fell on the Mag Wall |
| (United Kingdom) Keiha Dhruev | 50 | 2:23 | 5th | Missed the jump to the Mag Wall; Missed the jump to the Mag Wall |
| (Mexico) Miguel Angel Hernandez | 35 | 0:53 | 6th | Fell on Hyper Jump; Fell on Break Neck |

=== Episode 5: A New Battle Begins ===
==== Competitors ====
- Jesse Turner, 27 Stuntman - Team Australia - Semifinalist
- Norman Lichtenberg, 24 Parkour Performer - Team Germany - Semifinalist
- Laura Basta, 26 Circus Acrobatic Instructor - Team France - Eliminated on Level 3
- Austin Raye, 27 Social Media Influencer - Team USA - Eliminated on Level 3
- Rafael De Sousa, 32 Gymnastics Instructor - Team Brazil - Eliminated on Level 2
- Angelika Rainer, 30 Professional Ice Climber - Team Italy - Eliminated on Level 2
- Jong Seok Son, 28 Speed Climber - Team South Korea - Eliminated on Level 1
- Andrew French, 30 Design Engineer - Team UK - Eliminated on Level 1
- Allan Cardoso, 19 Business Management Student - Team Mexico - Eliminated on Level 1 with Injury

==== Level 1 ====
Level 1 Configuration: Lockjaw, Gear Head, Faceplant, Hyper Jump, Rib Cage Row, Crash Pads

| Competitor | Points | Time | Finish | Result |
|---|---|---|---|---|
| (Australia) Jesse Turner | 55 | 2:24 | 1st | Fell on Rib Cage Row |
| (United States) Austin Raye | 55 | 3:56 | 2nd | Fell on Rib Cage Row |
| (Germany) Norman Litchenberg | 20 | 0:57 | 3rd | Fell on Faceplant |
| (Brazil) Rafael De Sousa | 15 | 0:25 | 4th | Fell on Faceplant |
| (Italy) Angelika Rainer | 15 | 0:28 | 5th | Fell on Faceplant |
| (France) Laura Basta | 15 | 0:38 | 6th | Fell on Faceplant |
| (South Korea) Jong Seok Son | 10 | 0:18 | 7th | Missed the Jump off of Gear Head |
| (United Kingdom) Andrew French | 10 | 0:22 | 8th | Missed the jump off of Gear Head |
| (Mexico) Allan Cardoso | 40 | 2:24 | 9th | Dislocated a shoulder on Rib Cage Row |

==== Level 2 ====
| Competitor | Points | Time | Finish | Result |
|---|---|---|---|---|
| (Germany) Norman Litchenberg | 123 | 4:41 | 1st | Completed Level 2 |
| (Australia) Jesse Turner | 95 | 5:44 | 2nd | Completed Level 2 |
| (France) Laura Basta | 25 | 1:24 | 3rd | Missed the jump off the Dreadmills |
| (United States) Austin Raye | 25 | 1:29 | 4th | Missed the jump off the Dreadmills |
| (Brazil) Rafael De Sousa | 15 | 0:27 | 5th | Missed the jump to the Dreadmills |
| (Italy) Angelika Rainer | 15 | 0:42 | 6th | Missed the jump to the Dreadmills |

==== Level 3 ====
| Competitor | Points | Time | Finish | Result |
|---|---|---|---|---|
| (Australia) Jesse Turner | 52 | 2:33 | 1st | Fell on Viper Climb |
| (Germany) Norman Litchenberg | 45 | 2:00 | 2nd | Missed the Jump to Viper Climb |
| (France) Laura Basta | 35 | 2:29 | 3rd | Fell on Viper Climb |
| (United States) Austin Raye | 0 | 0:00 | 4th | Fell on Rail Runner |

=== Episode 6: Overcoming the Odds ===
==== Competitors ====
- Hector Martinez, 20 Professional Climber - Team Mexico - Semifinalist
- Mark Greenham, 30 Fashion Designer - Team Australia - Semifinalist
- Marty Bartow, 22 Rock Climbing Instructor - Team USA - Eliminated on Level 3
- Dave Ardito Rioja, 29 Filmmaker - Team Germany - Eliminated on Level 3
- Min Je Joo, 33 Spin Instructor - Team South Korea - Eliminated on Level 2
- Imogen Horrocks, 18 Champion Climber - Team UK - Eliminated on Level 2
- Alessandro Cazzavacca, 30 Landscaper - Team Italy - Eliminated on Level 1
- Thalisson Glaner Fagundes, 30 Soccer Coach - Team Brazil - Eliminated on Level 1
- Nicolas Cerquant, 31 Fitness Club Owner - Team France - Eliminated on Level 1

==== Level 1 ====
Level 1 Configuration: Lockjaw, Gear Head, Faceplant, Hyper Jump, Crank Shaft, Crash Pads

| Competitor | Points | Time | Finish | Result |
|---|---|---|---|---|
| (United States) Marty Bartow | 50 | 3:08 | 1st | Fell on the Crash Pads |
| (Mexico) Hector Martinez | 35 | 2:03 | 2nd | Missed the Jump to the Crash Pads |
| (Germany) Dave Ardito Rioja | 35 | 2:04 | 3rd | Missed the Jump to the Crash Pads |
| (Australia) Mark Greenham | 35 | 2:21 | 4th | Missed the Jump to the Crash Pads |
| (South Korea) Min Je Joo | 20 | 1:04 | 5th | Fell on Faceplant |
| (United Kingdom) Imogen Horrocks | 15 | 0:33 | 6th | Fell on Faceplant |
| (Italy) Alessandro Cazzavacca | 15 | 0:44 | 7th | Fell on Faceplant |
| (Brazil) Thalisson Glaner Fagundes | 10 | 0:13 | 8th | Missed the Jump off of Gear Head |
| (France) Nicolas Cerquant | 10 | 0:16 | 9th | Missed the Jump off of Gear Head |

==== Level 2 ====
| Competitor | Points | Time | Finish | Result |
|---|---|---|---|---|
| (Mexico) Hector Martinez | 146 | 3:50 | 1st | Completed Level 2 |
| (United States) Marty Bartow | 121 | 4:17 | 2nd | Completed Level 2 |
| (Germany) Dave Ardito Rioja | 25 | 0:38 | 3rd | Missed the Jump to the Dreadmills |
| (Australia) Mark Greenham | 25 | 0:46 | 4th | Missed the jump to the Dreadmills |
| (South Korea) Min Je Joo | 0 | 0:00 | 5th | Fell on Drop Zone |
| (United Kingdom) Imogen Horrocks | 0 | 0:00 | 6th | Disqualified on Drop Zone |

==== Level 3 ====
| Competitor | Points | Time | Finish | Result |
|---|---|---|---|---|
| (Mexico) Hector Martinez | 121 | Unk | 1st | Completed Level 3 |
| (Australia) Mark Greenham | 45 | 2:00 | 2nd | Fell on Viper Climb |
| (United States) Marty Bartow | 45 | 4:53 | 3rd | Fell on Viper Climb |
| (Germany) Dave Ardito Rioja | 0 | 0:00 | 4th | Fell on Rail Runner |

=== Episode 7: For the Glory ===
==== Competitors ====
- Luke Shelton, 29 Construction Worker - Team Australia - Semifinalist
- Corbin Mackin, 29 Veteran - Team UK - Semifinalist
- Roberto Del Pozzo, 23 Parkour Teacher - Team Italy - Eliminated on Level 3
- Walker Kearney, 36 Stay-At-Home Dad - Team USA - Eliminated on Level 3
- Bernardo Massuchin, 25 Criminal Lawyer - Team Brazil - Eliminated on Level 2
- Mauricio Martinez, 33 Personal Fitness Trainer - Team Mexico - Eliminated on Level 2
- Gemma Lee, 31 Crossfit Trainer - Team South Korea - Eliminated on Level 1
- Mathieu Sarouti, 32 Aeronautical Engineer - Team France - Eliminated on Level 1
- Alix Arndt, 38 Agricultural Sales - Team Germany - Eliminated on Level 1

==== Level 1 ====
Level 1 Configuration: Lockjaw, Gear Head, Faceplant, Hyper Jump, Dead Bolts, Mag Wall

| Competitor | Points | Time | Finish | Result |
|---|---|---|---|---|
| (Brazil) Bernardo Massuchin | 55 | 1:54 | 1st | Fell on the Dead Bolts |
| (United Kingdom) Corbin Mackin | 55 | 1:57 | 2nd | Fell on the Dead Bolts |
| (United States) Walker Kearney | 55 | 1:59 | 3rd | Fell on the Dead Bolts |
| (Italy) Roberto Del Pozzo | 35 | 1:58 | 4th | Fell on the Dead Bolts |
| (Mexico) Mauricio Martinez | 20 | 0:54 | 5th | Fell on Faceplant |
| (Australia) Luke Shelton | 10 | 0:14 | 6th | Missed the jump off of Gear Head |
| (South Korea) Gemma Lee | 10 | 0:28 | 7th | Fell on Gear Head |
| (France) Mathieu Sarouti | 10 | 0:29 | 8th | Missed the jump off of Gear Head |
| (Germany) Alix Arndt | 5 | 0:09 | 9th | Missed the jump to Gear Head |

==== Level 2 ====
| Competitor | Points | Time | Finish | Result |
|---|---|---|---|---|
| (United Kingdom) Corbin Mackin | 35 | 0:55 | 1st | Missed the jump off the Dreadmills |
| (Australia) Luke Shelton | 35 | 1:07 | 2nd | Missed the jump off the Dreadmills |
| (United States) Walker Kearney | 35 | 1:21 | 3rd | Missed the jump off the Dreadmills |
| (Italy) Roberto Del Pozzo | 25 | 1:20 | 4th | Missed the jump off the Dreadmills |
| (Brazil) Bernardo Massuchin | 20 | 0:21 | 5th | Missed the jump to Digestive Track |
| (Mexico) Mauricio Martinez | 0 | 0:00 | 6th | Disqualified on Drop Zone |

==== Level 3 ====
| Competitor | Points | Time | Finish | Result |
|---|---|---|---|---|
| (Australia) Luke Shelton | 45 | Unk | 1st | Fell on Viper Climb |
| (United Kingdom) Corbin Mackin | 30 | 1:04 | 2nd | Missed the Jump to Viper Climb |
| (Italy) Roberto Del Pozzo | 25 | 1:04 | 3rd | Fell on Power Surge |
| (United States) Walker Kearney | 0 | 0:10 | 4th | Fell on Rail Runner |

=== Episode 8: Semifinal #2 ===
==== Competitors ====
- Mark Greenham, 30 Fashion Designer - Team Australia - Episode 6 - Finalist
- Hector Martinez, 20 Professional Climber - Team Mexico - Episode 6 - Finalist
- Corbin Mackin, 29 Veteran - Team UK - Episode 7 - Finalist
- Jesse Turner, 27 Stuntman - Team Australia - Episode 5 - Eliminated
- Norman Lichtenberg, 24 Parkour Performer - Team Germany - Episode 5 - Eliminated
- Luke Shelton, 29 Construction Worker - Team Australia - Episode 7 - Eliminated

Level 1 Configuration: Lockjaw, Gear Head, Faceplant, Hyper Jump, Break Neck, Mag Wall

| Competitor | Points | Time | Finish | Result |
|---|---|---|---|---|
| (Australia) Mark Greenham | 140 | 3:52 | 1st | Missed the jump off the Dreadmills; Did not use Extra Life |
| (Mexico) Hector Martinez | 138 | 3:46 | 2nd | Missed the Jump off the Dreadmills; Missed the Jump off the Dreadmills |
| (United Kingdom) Corbin Mackin | 85 | 2:38 | 3rd | Fell on the Mag Wall; Did not use Extra Life |
| (Australia) Jesse Turner | 75 | 3:13 | 4th | Missed the jump to the Mag Wall; Fell on the Mag Wall |
| (Germany) Norman Litchenberg | 15 | 0:25 | 5th | Fell on Break Neck; Fell on Faceplant |
| (Australia) Luke Shelton | 15 | 0:31 | 6th | Fell on the Mag Wall; Fell on Faceplant |

=== Episode 9: The Ultimate Beastmaster Championship ===
==== Competitors ====
- Corbin Mackin, 29 Veteran - Team UK - Episode 7 - Ultimate Beastmaster
- Max Sprenger, 22 Media and Computer Science Student - Team Germany - Episode 1 - Eliminated on Level 4
- Jayden Irving, 26 Surfer - Team Australia - Episode 2 - Eliminated on Level 4
- James Drake, 36 Non-Profit Director - Team USA - Episode 1 - Eliminated on Level 3
- Mark Greenham, 30 Fashion Designer - Team Australia - Episode 6 - Eliminated on Level 2
- Hector Martinez, 20 Professional Climber - Team Mexico - Episode 6 - Eliminated on Level 1

==== Level 1 ====
Level 1 Configuration: Lockjaw, Gear Head, Faceplant, Hyper Jump, Chain Drive, Mag Wall

| Competitor | Points | Time | Finish | Result |
|---|---|---|---|---|
| (Australia) Jayden Irving | 121 | 3:31 | 1st | Completed Level 1 |
| (United Kingdom) Corbin Mackin | 117 | 3:23 | 2nd | Completed Level 1 |
| (Germany) Max Sprenger | 115 | 2:50 | 3rd | Completed Level 1 |
| (United States) James Drake | 80 | 2:58 | 4th | Fell on Mag Wall |
| (Australia) Mark Greenham | 75 | 2:36 | 5th | Fell on Mag Wall |
| (Mexico) Hector Martinez | 45 | 2:01 | 6th | Fell on Hyper Jump |

==== Level 2 ====
| Competitor | Points | Time | Finish | Result |
|---|---|---|---|---|
| (United Kingdom) Corbin Mackin | 40 | 1:46 | 1st | Fell on Destabilizer |
| (Germany) Max Sprenger | 35 | 0:59 | 2nd | Fell on Destabilizer |
| (United States) James Drake | 35 | 1:08 | 3rd | Fell on Destabilizer |
| (Australia) Jayden Irving | 35 | 1:12 | 4th | Fell on Destabilizer |
| (Australia) Mark Greenham | 35 | 1:20 | 5th | Fell on Destabilizer |

==== Level 3 ====
| Competitor | Points | Time | Finish | Result |
|---|---|---|---|---|
| (Australia) Jayden Irving | 166 | 3:08 | 1st | Completed Level 3 |
| (United Kingdom) Corbin Mackin | 91 | 2:09 | 2nd | Fell on Viper Climb |
| (Germany) Max Sprenger | 91 | 3:22 | 3rd | Fell on Viper Climb |
| (United States) James Drake | 75 | n/a | 4th | Fell on Viper Climb |

==== Level 4 ====
| Competitor | Points | Time | Finish | Result |
|---|---|---|---|---|
| (United Kingdom) Corbin Mackin | 1,244 | 1:58 | 1st | Ultimate Beastmaster |
| (Germany) Max Sprenger | 1,225 | 2:22 | 2nd | Eliminated |
| (Australia) Jayden Irving | 1,175 | 2:50 | 3rd | Eliminated |

== Broadcast ==
The show has nine country-specific versions. These have separate hosts, and languages, with one competitor from each country competing in each of the first eight episodes of the series (barring any of the Semifinals episodes). The countries are the U.S., Brazil, Germany, Mexico, South Korea, France, Italy, United Kingdom and Australia.

The hosts for the show are Tiki Barber and CM Punk (U.S.); Rafinha Bastos and Anderson Silva (Brazil); Micky Beisenherz and Jeannine Michaelsen (Germany); Luis Ernesto Franco and Ines Sainz (Mexico); Seo Kyung Suk and Park Kyeong Rim (South Korea); Gilles Marini and Sandy Heribert (France); Francesco Facchinetti and Bianca Balti (Italy); Stu Bennett and Kate Abdo (U.K.); and Dannii Minogue and Nick Cummins (Australia).
