= Ultimate Beastmaster season 1 =

American TV show season

Ultimate Beastmaster
- Season 1
- No. of contestants: 108
- Finals venue: Santa Clarita, California
- No. of episodes: 10

Release
- Original network: Netflix
- Original release: February 24, 2017

Season chronology
- Next → Season 2

The first season of the American reality competition series Ultimate Beastmaster premiered exclusively via Netflix's web streaming service on February 24, 2017. The show consists of 10 Beastmaster episodes which were released simultaneously on Netflix worldwide. The show was filmed in Santa Clarita, California, over the course of eight nights.

Olympic gold-medal swimmer Ed Moses competed in the second episode, Going for Gold, coming in second place.

== Hosts ==
In addition to Sylvester Stallone hosting the series, each country has their own set of two hosts/commentators for the competition. They are as follows:

Country	Host	
Brazil	Rafinha Bastos	Comedian
Brazil	Anderson Silva	UFC Fighter
Germany	Luke Mockridge	Comedian
Germany	Hans Sarpei	Professional Footballer
Japan	Yuji Kondo	Sports Broadcaster
Japan	Sayaka Akimoto	Singer/Actress
Mexico	Luis Ernesto Franco	Telenovela Star
Mexico	Ines Sainz	Sports Broadcaster
South Korea	Seo Kyung Suk	Radio/TV Personality
South Korea	Park Kyeong Rim	Radio/TV Personality
United States	Terry Crews	Actor
United States	Charissa Thompson	Television Host

Not only do each pair of hosts provide color commentary for each of the six localized versions, but the foreign commentators also make appearances in each localized version, with their commentary presented by subtitles. If a contestant completes a course, all hosts' reactions are shown on screen. Furthermore, since all host booths are placed in a row on the Ultimate Beastmaster set, commentators from one localization can easily walk into the booth of another localized version.

== The Beast ==
The obstacle course for the competition is known as The Beast, and it is divided into 4 Levels. Competitors with the highest scores after each level move on while those with the lowest scores are eliminated. Scores accumulate on levels 1–3, with ties decided in favor of the competitor with the lowest time. The obstacles are suspended over a body of red-tinted water referred to as Beast Blood and housed in a giant steel frame that takes the form of a large animal. A competitor is considered to have failed a Level if all four limbs are submerged into the Beast Blood. Failure ends the attempt at the current Level, but confers no penalties; except in the case of Level 3's bonus obstacles, in which completing additional challenges nets bonus points but failure removes points.

The winner of each episode is crowned the title Beastmaster. The nine beastmasters of all episodes then compete against each other in the final episode (episode 10). The winner, if completed the entire level 4 (reaching the top of The Power Source and obtained the final Point Thruster at the summit), is crowned the Ultimate Beastmaster and awarded $50,000.

=== Level 1 ===
In Level 1 all twelve competitors compete with the top eight scorers moving on.

- The Jawbreaker – Competitors must cross a series of parallel horizontal bars.
- Mother Tongue – Competitors must scale a 30 ft plank at a 45° angle with no grips, then jump onto a small climbing wall mounted above the ramp and successfully climb onto the ledge.
- Brain Matter – Competitors cross a 16" wide (reduced to 6" for the finals) suspended balance beam with the aid of a small gear handle above their head. The first Points Thruster is located midway along Brain Matter.
- Throat Erosion – Replacing Mother Tongue and Brain Matter in certain episodes, competitors must use an industrial trampoline to jump and grab a lever releasing a climbing wall.
- Faceplant – Competitors stand on a narrow platform, hands braced against panels on either side, as they are tilted forward to a 45° angle. They must then jump to a rope (sometimes a chain) and swing to the next obstacle.
- Energy Coils – Competitors must jump across a series of 8 semi-stationary hanging platform at various heights. The second (first if competitors faced Throat Erosion instead of Brain Matter) Point Thruster is located next to a side platform.
- Mag Wall – Competitors navigate horizontally across a climbing wall. Periodically the magnetic handholds are released and fall to the Beast's blood. The wall features an inversion, from which the competitors must jump to the finishing platform. A third and final Point Thruster was added toward the end of Mag Wall during the finals.

Each obstacle is worth ten points allowing for a possible total of 60 or 80 Points, depending on The Beast's configuration, with the opportunity of gathering 90 points in the final episode (season finale).

=== Level 2 ===
In Level 2 the top eight competitors compete, with the top five scorers moving on.

- Spinal Ascent – Competitors must complete a series of vertical jumps, with the largest being 8 feet. Three platforms are fixed, while two are suspended.
- Spinal Descent – Competitors must work their way down through a cable web, the cables becoming thinner and thinner toward the bottom. A Point Thruster is located at the bottom.
- Stomach Churn – Competitors must traverse three spinning platforms all at varying heights.
- Digestive Track – Jumping from the last spinning platform into a tube, competitors must climb the tube before it sinks and jump to the next obstacle.
- Dreadmills – Competitors must cross a pair of suspended treadmills and leap to a platform.
- Chain Reaction – Competitors must swing across a series of hanging chains. A Point Thruster is located midway across.
- Vertebrace – Competitors must hop through a series of five suspended vertebrae-shaped hoops and jump to the finish platform. A Point Thruster is located at the left of the second vertebrae.

Each obstacle is worth 20 points allowing for a possible total of 160 or 200 points, depending on The Beast's configuration.

=== Level 3 (Energy Pyramid) ===
In Level 3, also known as the Energy Pyramid, the top 5 scorers compete, with the top two advancing to the final level.

- The Ejector – Competitors must mount a 14 MPH forward-moving treadmill and attempt to grab a suspended rope handle (attached to Prism Strike).
- Prism Strike – Competitors must hold onto the rope handle as it swings through a curved track. A Points Thruster is located to the side of the track roughly midway through.
- The Coil Crawl – Competitors must work their way through a tube structure made of pipe and chain before it sinks into the water.

At the end of the Coil Crawl competitors must make a choice between two paths. If competitors choose to go right (The Course) they only have to complete one more obstacle:

- The Extractor – Competitors must climb a series of hanging poles to reach a high platform.

If competitors choose to go left (The Bonus Obstacles) they have a chance to do three more obstacles:

- Bungee Beds – Competitors must traverse three unstable platforms suspended at varying heights by bungee cords. This obstacle has mats beneath, and a competitor fails if any part of their body touches the mat.
- Tricky Trapeze – Competitors must use their momentum to swing across three trapeze bars. The first bar is held magnetically in place and will instantly release upon being grabbed. The next two bars are suspended on a pulley which enables them to shift from side-to-side further making traversing them far harder.
- Weapon – Competitors must use grip handles to slide across 2 sets of v-shaped bars. The first set descends to the second set. The competitor then must jump to the finishing platform.

Obstacles (excluding those on the bonus course) are worth 30 points. Bonus obstacles are worth 40 points each, and a competitor may choose to accept their bonus score and decline the remaining obstacle(s). Failure on any of the bonus obstacles forfeits any bonus points and suffers a 40-point penalty. The highest possible total is 240 points.

=== Level 4 (The Power Source) ===
In Level 4 all scores are reset to 0 and the top 2 competitors face each other on The Power Source, an eighty-foot climbing wall, with the top 1 being the Ultimate Beastmaster for the finals.

- Foundation – Competitors navigate a wall of increasingly small handholds.
- Grid Lock – Instead of handholds, competitors must climb using 2-inch-wide slots cut into the surface in a grid-like pattern.
- Ventilator – Competitors must ascend a narrow vertical crevice.
- High Voltage – Competitors face a sheer vertical surface with only two extremely narrow ledges.
- There is a final Point Thruster at the summit of The Power Source.

Along all four sections of the Power Source are Energy Taps, green buttons which the competitors must touch in order to gain points. Each Energy Tap is worth ten points, except the 2 energy Taps from High Voltage which are worth 40 points. Competitors are given six minutes to accumulate the highest possible score, with ties decided in favor of the competitor who is currently highest on the tower. There is no failure condition for the Power Source, and competitors may attempt to regain their footing if they lose grip on the tower/wall or fall.

== Episodes ==
The contestant was named Beastmaster.
The contestants completed that level.
The contestant was eliminated on that round.

=== Episode 1: Beast Nation ===
==== Competitors ====
- Heeyong Park, 34 Ice Climber – Team South Korea – Beastmaster
- Simon Brunner, 18 College Student – Team Germany – Eliminated on Level 4
- Ricardo de Oliviera, 24 Parkour Instructor – Team Brazil – Eliminated on Level 3
- Omar Zamitiz, 36 Rehab Trainer – Team Mexico – Eliminated on Level 3
- Matias Chavez Jimenez, 29 Parkour Athlete – Team Mexico – Eliminated on Level 3
- Markus Ertelt, 37 Actor – Team Germany – Eliminated on Level 2
- Shaun Provost, 26 Obstacle Course Racer – Team USA – Eliminated on Level 2
- Shinobi Poli, 31 Parkour Teacher – Team USA – Eliminated on Level 2
- Toyohiko Kubota, 40 Sports School Owner – Team Japan – Eliminated on Level 1
- Takehide Sato, 34 Crossfit Coach – Team Japan – Eliminated on Level 1
- Myon Tuk Han, 33 Fitness Model – Team South Korea – Eliminated on Level 1
- Karine Abrahim, 31 Hairdresser – Team Brazil – Eliminated on Level 1

==== Level 1 ====
A perfect run will give you a score of 80 points.

Competitor	Points	Time	Finish	Result
(Germany) Simon Brunner	70	3:05	1st	Fell on the Mag Wall
(South Korea) Heeyong Park	70	5:50	2nd	Finished Level 1
(Germany) Markus Ertelt	50	2:19	3rd	Fell on the Energy Coils
(Brazil) Ricardo de Oliviera	50	2:57	4th	Fell on the Mag Wall
(United States) Shaun Provost	50	4:32	5th	Fell on the Mag Wall
(Mexico) Omar Zamitiz	50	4:33	6th	Fell on the Mag Wall
(United States) Shinobi Poli	40	2:32	7th	Fell on the Energy Coils
(Mexico) Matias Chavez Jimenez	40	2:48	8th	Fell on the Energy Coils
(Japan) Toyohiko Kubota	40	3:08	9th	Fell on the Faceplant
(Japan) Takehide Sato	40	3:28	10th	Fell on the Energy Coils
(South Korea) Myon Tuk Han	30	2:22	11th	Fell on the Faceplant
(Brazil) Karine Ibrahim	10	0:18	12th	Fell on Mother Tongue

==== Level 2 ====
Competitor	Points	Time	Finish	Result
(Germany) Simon Brunner	210	3:41	1st	Fell on Chain Reaction
(Mexico) Omar Zamitiz	150	2:58	2nd	Missed the Jump to the Dreadmills
(South Korea) Heeyong Park	130	2:44	3rd	Fell on Stomach Churn
(Brazil) Ricardo de Oliviera	110	2:18	4th	Fell on Stomach Churn
(Mexico) Matias Chavez Jimenez	100	2:34	5th	Fell on Stomach Churn
(Germany) Markus Ertelt	50	2:25	6th	Fell on Spinal Ascend
(United States) Shaun Provost	50	3:20	7th	Fell on Spinal Ascend
(United States) Shinobi Poli	40	3:16	8th	Fell on Spinal Ascend

==== Level 3 ====
Competitor	Points	Time	Finish	Result
(South Korea) Heeyong Park	340	6:19	1st	Completed the Bonus Level 3 obstacle
(Germany) Simon Brunner	290	0:59	2nd	Fell on Bungee Beds
(Brazil) Ricardo de Oliviera	160	1:33	3rd	Fell on Bungee Beds
(Mexico) Omar Zamitiz	150	0:06	4th	Missed the Jump off the Ejector
(Mexico) Matias Chavez Jimenez	100	0:06	5th	Missed the Jump off the Ejector

==== Level 4 ====
Competitor	Points	Height	Finish	Result
(South Korea) Heeyong Park	180	Ventilator 76'	1st	Beastmaster
(Germany) Simon Brunner	180	Ventilator 74'	2nd	Eliminated

=== Episode 2: Going for Gold ===
==== Competitors ====
- David Manthei, 20 Architecture Student – Team Germany – Beastmaster
- Ed Moses, 35 Olympic Swimmer – Team USA – Eliminated on Level 4
- Jinbong Lee, 29 Former Special Forces – Team South Korea – Eliminated on Level 3
- Johannes Gmelin, 33 Crossfit Gym Owner – Team Brazil – Eliminated on Level 3
- Koohun Lee, 32 Crossfit Athlete – Team South Korea – Eliminated on Level 3
- Angelica "Wild Rabbit" Melo, 20 Communications Student – Team Mexico – Eliminated on Level 2
- Jacobo Luchtan, 26 Technology Firm COO – Team Mexico – Eliminated on Level 2
- Shoji Nakayama, 37 Comedian – Team Japan – Eliminated on Level 2
- Hanah Jamroz, 21 Online Personal Trainer – Team USA – Eliminated on Level 1
- Marcel Tratnik, 34 Lifeguard – Team Germany – Eliminated on Level 1
- Yoshifumi Fujita, 28 Strongman – Team Japan – Eliminated on Level 1
- Simone de Araujo, 34 Capoeira Instructor – Team Brazil – Eliminated on Level 1

==== Level 1 ====
Competitor	Points	Time	Finish	Result
(Brazil) Johannes Gmelin	60	3:09	1st	Fell on the Energy Coils
(United States) Ed Moses	60	4:09	2nd	Fell on the Mag Wall
(South Korea) Koohun Lee	60	5:47	3rd	Voluntarily jump off the last Energy Coil
(South Korea) Jimbong Lee	50	2:54	4th	Fell on the Energy Coils
(Mexico) Jacobo Luchtan	50	3:01	5th	Fell on the Energy Coils
(Germany) David Manthei	50	Unk	6th	Fell on the Mag Wall
(Japan) Shoji Nakayama	40	2:48	7th	Fell on the Energy Coils
(Mexico) Angelica “Wild Rabbit” Melo	40	2:54	8th	Fell on the Energy Coils
(United States) Hanah Jamroz	40	2:56	9th	Fell on the Energy Coils
(Germany) Marcel Tranik	40	3:24	10th	Fell on the Energy Coils
(Japan) Yoshifumi Fujita	40	4:26	11th	Fell on the Energy Coils
(Brazil) Simone de Araújo	10	0:26	12th	Fell on Mother Tongue

==== Level 2 ====
Competitor	Points	Time	Finish	Result
(Brazil) Johannes Gmelin	160	3:54	1st	Missed the jump off the Dreadmills
(United States) Ed Moses	160	6:12	2nd	Missed the jump off the Dreadmills
(South Korea) Jinbong Lee	150	5:31	3rd	Missed the jump to the Dreadmills
(Germany) David Manthei	150	6:15	4th	Missed the jump to the Dreadmills
(South Korea) Koohun Lee	120	Timed Out	5th	Timed out on Stomach Churn
(Mexico) Angelica “Wild Rabbit” Melo	100	3:22	6th	Fell on Stomach Churn
(Mexico) Jacobo Luchtan	90	8:42	7th	Fell on Spinal Descent
(Japan) Shoji Nakayama	40	3:16	8th	Fell on Spinal Ascent

==== Level 3 ====
Competitor	Points	Time	Finish	Result
(Germany) David Manthei	240	6:37	1st	Fell on Tricky Trapeze
(United States) Ed Moses	220	0:36	2nd	Sunk in Coil Crawl
(South Korea) Jinbong Lee	180	0:34	3rd	Fell on Prism Strike
(Brazil) Johannes Gmelin	160	0:08	4th	Missed the jump off the Ejector
(South Korea) Koohun Lee	120	0:07	5th	Missed the jump off the Ejector

==== Level 4 ====
Competitor	Points	Height	Finish	Result
(Germany) David Manthei	130	Grid Lock	1st	Beastmaster
(United States) Ed Moses	120	Grid Lock	2nd	Eliminated

=== Episode 3: The Beast Evolves ===
==== Competitors ====
- Steven Tucker, 29 Rock Climbing Instructor – Team USA – Beastmaster
- Emmanuel Chiang, 22 Law Student – Team Mexico – Eliminated on Level 4
- Marcel Scarpim, 33 Engineer – Team Brazil – Eliminated on Level 3
- Ryan Scott, 32 Financial Advisor – Team USA – Eliminated on Level 3
- Fernando Casanova, 37 Musician – Team Mexico – Eliminated on Level 3
- Taeyoung Lee, 29 Stunt Director – Team South Korea – Eliminated on Level 2
- Joel Pusitzky, 26 Professional Model – Team Germany – Eliminated on Level 2
- Maki Morishima, 32 Pole Dancer – Team Japan – Eliminated on Level 2
- Carol Valim, 33 Circus Performer – Team Brazil – Eliminated on Level 1
- Kyoung Duck Kang, 33 Personal Trainer – Team South Korea – Eliminated on Level 1
- Hiroyuki Tanaka, 25 Tech Consultant – Team Japan – Eliminated on Level 1
- Kerstin Schoessler, 33 Sport Scientist – Team Germany – Eliminated on Level 1

==== Level 1 ====
Competitor	Points	Time	Finish	Result
(South Korea) Taeyoung Lee	40	2:35	1st	Fell on the Energy Coils
(Germany) Joel Pusitzky	40	2:47	2nd	Fell on the Mag Wall
(Brazil) Marcel Scarpim	40	3:27	3rd	Fell on the Mag Wall
(United States) Ryan Scott	30	2:15	4th	Fell on the Energy Coils
(United States) Steven Tucker	30	2:16	5th	Fell on the Energy Coils
(Mexico) Fernando Casanova	30	2:28	6th	Fell on the Energy Coils
(Mexico) Emmanuel Chiang	30	2:36	7th	Fell on the Energy Coils
(Japan) Maki Mourishima	30	5:11	8th	Fell on the Energy Coils
(Brazil) Carol Valim	20	2:13	9th	Fell on Faceplant
(South Korea) Kyoung Duck Kang	20	2:45	10th	Fell on Faceplant
(Japan) Hiroyuki Tanaka	20	3:56	11th	Fell on Faceplant
(Germany) Kerstin Schöessler	10	1:53	12th	Failed Throat Erosion

==== Level 2 ====
Competitor	Points	Time	Finish	Result
(United States) Steven Tucker	150	4:07	1st	Missed the jump to Vertabrace
(Brazil) Marcel Scarpim	120	3:54	2nd	Missed the jump to the Dreadmills
(United States) Ryan Scott	110	3:25	3rd	Missed the jump to the Dreadmills
(Mexico) Emmanuel Chiang	110	4:43	4th	Missed the jump to the Dreadmills
(Mexico) Fernando Casanova	90	3:14	5th	Sunk in Digestive Track
(South Korea) Taeyoung Lee	80	3:10	6th	Fell on Stomach Churn
(Germany) Joel Pusitzky	80	3:45	7th	Fell on Stomach Churn
(Japan) Maki Mourishima	70	4:57	8th	Fell on Stomach Churn

==== Level 3 ====
Competitor	Points	Time	Finish	Result
(Mexico) Emmanuel Chiang	270	7:31	1st	Voluntarily stop on the Bungee Beds
(United States) Steven Tucker	210	0:21	2nd	Sunk in Coil Crawl
(Brazil) Marcel Scarpim	120	Unk	3rd	Missed the jump off the Ejector
(United States) Ryan Scott	110	0:07	4th	Missed the jump off the Ejector
(Mexico) Fernando Casanova	90	0:10	5th	Missed the jump off the Ejector

==== Level 4 ====
Competitor	Points	Height	Finish	Result
(United States) Steven Tucker	170	High Voltage	1st	Beastmaster
(Mexico) Emmanuel Chiang	120	Grid Lock	2nd	Eliminated

=== Episode 4: The Legend vs. The Beast ===
==== Competitors ====
- Philip Meyer, 23 Soldier – Team Germany – Beastmaster
- Taeho Kwon, 31 Actor and Fitness Model – Team South Korea – Eliminated on Level 4
- Marcel Stevanin, 25 Parkour Athlete - Team Brazil - Eliminated on Level 3
- Eduardo Oliveira, 33 PE Teacher, Team Brazil – Eliminated on Level 3
- Yuji Urushihara, 37 Shoes Salesman/Sasuke Legend – Team Japan – Eliminated on Level 3
- Jonas Kegelmann, 19 Parkour Instructor – Team Germany – Eliminated on Level 2
- Jalil Al Akabani, 29 Store Owner – Team Mexico – Eliminated on Level 2
- Jongsuk Kim, 26 Personal Trainer – Team South Korea – Eliminated on Level 2
- Juan Bernardo, 30 Criminal Lawyer – Team USA – Eliminated on Level 1
- Yuriko Santander, 32 Electrical Engineer – Team Mexico – Eliminated on Level 1
- Cortni Joyner, 30 Professional Soccer Player – Team USA – Eliminated on Level 1
- Yuki Fukumoto, 25 Professional Dancer – Team Japan – Eliminated on Level 1

==== Level 1 ====
Competitor	Points	Time	Finish	Result
(Japan) Yuji Urushihara	70	5:22	1st	Completed Level 1
(Germany) Jonas Kegelmann	60	2:32	2nd	Fell on the Energy Coils
(Brazil) Marcel Stevanin	60	2:48	3rd	Fell on the Mag Wall
(South Korea) Taeho Kwon	60	2:54	4th	Fell on the Mag Wall
(Germany) Philip Meyer	60	3:15	5th	Fell on the Energy Coils
(Mexico) Jalil Al Akabani	60	3:58	6th	Fell on the Mag Wall
(South Korea) Jongsuk Kim	40	1:52	7th	Fell on the Faceplant
(Brazil) Eduardo Oliveira	40	2:13	8th	Fell on the Faceplant
(United States) Juan Bernando	40	2:43	9th	Fell on the Faceplant
(Mexico) Yuriko Santander	40	3:53	10th	Fell on the Faceplant
(United States) Cortni Joyner	30	4:52	11th	Failed Throat Erosion
(Japan) Yuki Fukumoto	10	0:24	12th	Fell on the Mother Tongue

==== Level 2 ====
Competitor	Points	Time	Finish	Result
(South Korea) Taeho Kwon	220	4:28	1st	Completed Level 2
(Germany) Philip Meyer	180	4:44	2nd	Fell on the Chain Reaction
(Brazil) Marcel Stevanin	160	2:15	3rd	Missed the Jump to the Dreadmills
(Brazil) Eduardo Oliveira	120	4:02	4th	Missed the Jump to the Dreadmills
(Japan) Yuji Urushihara	110	1:59	5th	Fell on the Spinal Descent
(Germany) Jonas Kegelmann	100	1:40	6th	Fell on the Stomach Churn
(Mexico) Jalil Al Akabani	60	3:32	7th	Fell on the Spinal Ascent
(South Korea) Jongsuk Kim	40	4:23	8th	Fell on the Spinal Ascent

==== Level 3 ====
Competitor	Points	Time	Finish	Result
(South Korea) Taeho Kwon	270	10:45	1st	Fell on the Bungee Beds
(Germany) Philip Meyer	240	8:31	2nd	Fell on the Coil Crawl
(Brazil) Marcel Stevanin	160	5:03	3rd	Fell on Prism strike
(Brazil) Eduardo Oliveira	120	6:15	4th	Fell on the Ejector
(Japan) Yuji Urushihara	110	7:21	5th	Missed the jump off the Ejector

==== Level 4 ====
Competitor	Points	Height	Finish	Result
(Germany) Philip Meyer	180	High Voltage	1st	Beastmaster
(South Korea) Taeho Kwon	140	Grid Lock	2nd	Eliminated

=== Episode 5: The Battle of Wills ===
==== Competitors ====
- Roberto Perez, 25 Chemical Engineering Student – Team Mexico – Beastmaster
- Charles Robinson, 25 Retired Marine – Team USA – Eliminated on Level 4
- Philipp Hell, 25 Software Developer – Team Germany – Eliminated on Level 3
- Alfredo Bermudes, 34 Acrobat – Team Brazil – Eliminated on Level 3
- Tomomichi Shiozaki, 28 Firefighter – Team Japan – Eliminated on Level 3
- Satoshi Mashito, 38 Arm Wrestler – Team Japan – Eliminated on Level 2
- Chico Salgado, 33 Martial Arts Instructor – Team Brazil – Eliminated on Level 2
- Todd Wise, 29 Crossfit Gym Owner – Team USA – Eliminated on Level 2
- Gundam Kim, 35 Personal Trainer – Team South Korea – Eliminated on Level 1
- Georgina "Gina" Castillo, 34 Single Mom – Team Mexico – Eliminated on Level 1
- Sungsoon Chang, 30 Swim Trainer – Team South Korea – Eliminated on Level 1
- Michael Pela, 26 Lawyer – Team Germany – Eliminated on Level 1

==== Level 1 ====
Competitor	Points	Time	Finish	Result
(Mexico) Roberto Perez	40	n/a	1st	Completed Level 1
(Germany) Philip Hell	30	1:50	2nd	Voluntarily fell on the Energy Coils
(United States) Charles Robinson	30	1:52	3rd	Fell on the Mag Wall
(Brazil) Chico Salgado	30	2:30	4th	Fell on the Mag Wall
(Brazil) Alfredo Bermudes	30	2:38	5th	Fell on the Mag Wall
(Japan) Satochi Mashito	30	2:48	6th	Missed the jump to the final platform
(Japan) Tomomichi Shiozaki	30	2:51	7th	Fell on the Mag Wall
(United States) Todd Wise	20	1:03	8th	Fell on the Energy Coils
(South Korea) Gundam Kim	20	1:04	9th	Fell on the Energy Coils
(Mexico) Georgina “Gina” Castillo	20	1:05	10th	Fell on the Energy Coils
(South Korea) Sungsoon Chang	20	1:41	11th	Fell on the Energy Coils
(Germany) Micheal Pela	10	0:58	12th	Fell on Faceplant

==== Level 2 ====
Competitor	Points	Time	Finish	Result
(Mexico) Roberto Perez	180	2:48	1st	Fell on Chain Reaction
(United States) Charles Robinson	150	4:15	2nd	Fell on Chain Reaction
(Germany) Philip Hell	130	2:43	3rd	Fell on Chain Reaction
(Japan) Tomomichi Shiozaki	110	4:32	4th	Missed the jump to the Dreadmills
(Brazil) Alfredo Bermudes	110	5:09	5th	Missed the jump off the Dreadmills
(Japan) Satoshi Mashito	110	5:12	6th	Missed the jump to the Dreadmills
(Brazil) Chico Salgado	30	2:26	7th	Disqualified on Spinal Ascent
(United States) Todd Wise	20	3:16	8th	Fell on Spinal Ascent

==== Level 3 ====
Competitor	Points	Time	Finish	Result
(Mexico) Roberto Perez	310	3:48	1st	Voluntarily stop on Bungee Beds
(United States) Charles Robinson	200	1:14	2nd	Fell on the Bungee Beds
(Germany) Philip Hell	180	1:10	3rd	Fell on the Bungee Beds
(Brazil) Alfredo Bermudes	140	0:03	4th	Fell on Prism Strike
(Japan) Tomomichi Shiozaki	110	0:06	5th	Fell on Prism Strike

==== Level 4 ====
Competitor	Points	Height	Finish	Result
(Mexico) Roberto Perez	180	High Voltage (n/a)	1st	Beastmaster
(United States) Charles Robinson	110	Grid Lock (n/a)	2nd	Eliminated

=== Episode 6: Beauty Meets the Beast ===
==== Competitors ====
- Hyunho Kim, 30 Crossfit trainer – South Korea – Beastmaster
- Santiago López, 29 Wine Maker – Mexico – Eliminated on Level 4
- Trevor Carter, 32 Firefighter – United States – Eliminated on Level 3
- Silke Sollfrank, 18 Student – Germany – Eliminated on Level 3
- Akio Shimofuji, 29 Office employee – Japan – Eliminated on Level 3
- Phelipe Young, 25 Circus acrobat – Brazil – Eliminated on Level 2
- Marco Cerullo, 27 Bartender – Germany – Eliminated on Level 2
- Daesung Oh, 31 Personal Trainer – South Korea – Eliminated on Level 2
- Guilherme Medeiros, 35 Special police (BOPE) – Brazil – Eliminated on Level 1
- Júlio Códova, 28 Jiu Jitsu fighter – Mexico – Eliminated on Level 1
- Eiji Semba, 28 Personal Trainer – Japan – Eliminated on Level 1
- Lindsay Andrew, 33 Crossfit athlete – United States – Eliminated on Level 1

==== Level 1 ====
Competitor	Points	Time	Finish	Result
(Germany) Marco Cerullo	50	3:03	1st	Fell on the Mag Wall
(Brazil) Phelipe Young	50	3:04	2nd	Fell on the Mag Wall
(South Korea) Hyunho Kim	50	4:02	3rd	Fell on the Mag Wall
(Japan) Akio Shimofuji	50	4:17	4th	Fell on the Mag Wall
(Germany) Silke Sollfrank	30	1:43	5th	Fell on the Faceplant
(South Korea) Daesung Oh	30	1:45	6th	Fell on the Faceplant
(Mexico) Santiago López	30	1:46	7th	Fell on the Faceplant
(United States) Trevor Carter	30	1:50	8th	Fell on the Faceplant
(Brazil) Guilherme Medeiros	30	1:55	9th	Fell on the Faceplant
(Mexico) Julio Córdova	30	2:00	10th	Fell on the Faceplant
(Japan) Eiji Semba	10	0:20	11th	Fell on the Mother Tongue
(United States) Lindsay Andrew	10	0:21	12th	Fell on the Mother Tongue

==== Level 2 ====
Competitor	Points	Time	Finish	Result
(South Korea) Hyunho Kim	150	3:35	1st	Fell on the Chain Reaction
(Japan) Akio Shimofuji	150	4:32	2nd	Fell on the Chain Reaction
(Mexico) Santiago López	110	2:31	3rd	Missed the Jump off the Dreadmills
(Germany) Silke Sollfrank	90	3:01	4th	Fell on the Stomach Churn
(United States) Trevor Carter	90	3:30	5th	Fell on the Stomach Churn
(Brazil) Phelipe Young	50	4:00	6th	Fell on the Spinal Ascent
(Germany) Marco Cerullo	50	4:15	7th	Fell on the Spinal Ascent
(South Korea) Daesung Oh	30	2:02	8th	Fell on the Spinal Ascent

==== Level 3 ====
Competitor	Points	Time	Finish	Result
(South Korea) Hyunho Kim	240	1:09	1st	Fell on the Extractor
(Mexico) Santiago López	200	3:07	2nd	Fell on the Tricky Trapeze
(United States) Trevor Carter	180	1:24	3rd	Fell on the Extractor
(Germany) Silke Sollfrank	180	1:36	4th	Fell on the Extractor
(Japan) Akio Shimofuji	150	0:08	5th	Fell on the Ejector

==== Level 4 ====
Competitor	Points	Height	Finish	Result
(South Korea) Hyunho Kim	120	Grid Lock (Unk)	1st	Beastmaster
(Mexico) Santiago López	100	Grid Lock (Unk)	2nd	Eliminated

=== Episode 7: Beast Mode ===
==== Competitors ====
- Felipe Camargo, 24 Professional Climber – Team Brazil – Beastmaster

Completed Level 4 in 5:09

- Ludwig Hefele, 18 Physics Student – Team Germany – Eliminated on Level 4
- César Curti, 29 Mahamudra Instructor – Team Brazil – Eliminated on Level 3
- Ivan Zepeda, 20 Cheerleader – Team Mexico – Eliminated on Level 3
- Chang Suk Bang, 35 Former Special Forces – Team South Korea – Eliminated on Level 3
- Woochul Kim, 34 Basketball Player – Team South Korea – Eliminated on Level 2
- Steffen Zimmermann, 25 Psychologist – Team Germany – Eliminated on Level 2
- Daigo Nakano, 28 Physiotherapist – Team Japan – Eliminated on Level 2
- Kaori Sakai, 30 Service representative – Team Japan – Eliminated on Level 1
- Thaily Amezcua, 37 Novel Actress – Team Mexico – Eliminated on Level 1
- Mimi Bonny, 31 Entrepreneur – Team USA – Eliminated on Level 1
- Brandon Douglass, 27 Parkour Athlete – Team USA – Eliminated on Level 1

==== Level 1 ====
Competitor	Points	Time	Finish	Result
(South Korea) Woochul Kim	70	4:31	1st	Fell on the Mag Wall
(Brazil) Felipe Camargo	70	5:10	2nd	Completed Level 1
(South Korea) Chang Suk Bang	70	5:34	3rd	Completed Level 1
(Germany) Ludwig Hefele	60	3:07	4th	Fell on the Mag Wall
(Mexico) Ivan Zepada	50	2:22	5th	Fell on the Energy Coils
(Germany) Steffen Zimmermann	50	3:05	6th	Fell on the Energy Coils
(Japan) Diago Nakano	50	4:03	7th	Fell on the Energy Coils
(Brazil) César Curti	40	2:08	8th	Fell on Faceplant
(Japan) Kaori Sakai	40	2:10	9th	Fell on Faceplant
(Mexico) Thaily Amezcua	30	1:19	10th	Failed Throat Erosion
(United States) Mimi Bonny	30	4:23	11th	Failed Throat Erosion
(United States) Brandon Douglass	20	0:21	12th	Fell on Brain Matter

==== Level 2 ====
Competitor	Points	Time	Finish	Result
(Brazil) Felipe Camargo	170	3:52	1st	Fell on the Dreadmills
(Germany) Ludwig Hefele	160	6:07	2nd	Missed the jump off the Dreadmills
(South Korea) Chang Suk Bang	150	3:35	3rd	Got caught in Digestive Track
(Brazil) César Curti	140	n/a	4th	Missed the jump to the Dreadmills
(Mexico) Ivan Zepeda	130	3:46	5th	Fell on the Digestive Track
(South Korea) Woochul Kim	110	8:42	6th	Fell on the Spinal Descent
(Germany) Steffen Zimmermann	50	2:26	7th	Fell on the Spinal Ascent
(Japan) Daigo Nakano	50	3:16	8th	Fell on the Spinal Ascent

==== Level 3 ====
Competitor	Points	Time	Finish	Result
(Brazil) Felipe Camargo	260	2:00	1st	Fell on the Extractor
(Germany) Ludwig Hefele	250	n/a	2nd	Fell on the Extractor
(Brazil) César Curti	200	0:15	3rd	Sunk in Coil Crawl
(Mexico) Ivan Zepeda	160	0:06	4th	Fell on Prism Strike
(South Korea) Chang Suk Bang	150	0:12	5th	Fell on the Ejector

==== Level 4 ====
Competitor	Points	Height	Finish	Result
(Brazil) Felipe Camargo	200	Completed Level 4	1st	Beastmaster
(Germany) Ludwig Hefele	130	Grid Lock (n/a)	2nd	Eliminated

=== Episode 8: Brother vs. Brother ===
==== Competitors ====
- Jonathan Collins, 33 Track Coach and Model – Team USA – Beastmaster
- Yungyung Kim, 20 Gymnast – Team South Korea – Eliminated on Level 4
- Tabito Okayasu, 29 Actor – Team Japan – Eliminated on Level 3
- Adrien Ngouah-Ngally, 19 Mover and Student – Team Germany – Eliminated on Level 3
- Yoshitaro Fujiwara, 27 Professional Trainer – Team Japan – Eliminated on Level 3
- Adrian Raya, 31 Frontenis Player – Team Mexico – Eliminated on Level 2
- Yunhwan Kim, 22 Gymnast – Team South Korea – Eliminated on Level 2
- Marcelo Munhoz, 23 Triathlon Athlete – Team Brazil – Eliminated on Level 2
- Rafael Picolo, 31 Surf Instructor – Team Brazil – Eliminated on Level 1
- Julia Habitzreither, 30 Medical Student – Team Germany – Eliminated on Level 1
- Isaiah Stanback, 31 Ex NFL Player – Team USA – Eliminated on Level 1
- Claudia Lopez, 33 Lawyer – Team Mexico – Eliminated on Level 1

==== Level 1 ====
Competitor	Points	Time	Finish	Result
(United States) Jonathan Collins	70	3:52	1st	Fell on the Mag Wall
(Germany) Adrien Ngouah-Ngally	60	2:32	2nd	Voluntarily jumped off the third Energy Coil
(Japan) Tabito Okayasu	60	3:10	3rd	Fell on the Mag Wall
(South Korea) Yungyung Kim	60	3:33	4th	Fell on the Mag Wall
(South Korea) Yunhwah Kim	60	5:01	5th	Fell on the Mag Wall
(Mexico) Adrian Raya	40	1:52	6th	Fell on Faceplant
(Brazil) Marcelo Munhoz	40	2:07	7th	Fell on Faceplant
(Japan) Yoshitaro Fujiwara	40	2:36	8th	Fell on Faceplant
(Brazil) Rafael Picolo	40	2:45	9th	Fell on Faceplant
(Germany) Julia Habitzreither	30	1:25	10th	Failed Throat Erosion
(United States) Isaiah Stanback	10	0:26	11th	Fell on Mother Tongue
(Mexico) Claudia Lopez	10	0:29	12th	Fell on Mother Tongue

==== Level 2 ====
Competitor	Points	Time	Finish	Result
(South Korea) Yungyung Kim	180	5:01	1st	Fell on Chain Reaction
(United States) Jonathan Collins	170	4:54	2nd	Missed the jump to the Dreadmills
(Germany) Adrien Ngouah-Ngally	120	2:37	3rd	Fell on Stomach Churn
(Japan) Tabito Okayasu	120	3:22	4th	Voluntarily sunk in Digestive Track
(Japan) Yoshitaro Fujiwara	120	4:10	5th	Missed the jump to the Dreadmills
(Mexico) Adrian Raya	100	2:17	6th	Fell on Digestive Track
(South Korea) Yunhwan Kim	60	1:23	7th	Fell on Spinal Ascent
(Brazil) Marcelo Munhoz	40	2:07	8th	Fell on Spinal Ascent

==== Level 3 ====
Competitor	Points	Time	Finish	Result
(United States) Jonathan Collins	260	2:26	1st	Fell on The Extractor
(South Korea) Yungyung Kim	240	1:01	2nd	Fell on Coil Crawl
(Japan) Tabito Okayasu	170	2:00	3rd	Fell on Bungee Beds
(Germany) Adrien Ngouah-Ngally	120	0:06	4th	Fell on The Ejector
(Japan) Yoshitaro Fujiwara	120	0:07	5th	Fell on The Ejector

==== Level 4 ====
Competitor	Points	Height	Finish	Result
(United States) Jonathan Collins	120	Grid Lock (Unk)	1st	Beastmaster
(South Korea) Yungyung Kim	110	Grid Lock (Unk)	2nd	Eliminated

=== Episode 9: The Last Call ===
==== Competitors ====
- Ken Corigliano, 35 Air Force Major – Team USA – Beastmaster
- Nam Vo, 25 Mechanical Engineering Student – Team Germany – Eliminated on Level 4
- Bruno Nogueira, 30 US Army Veteran – Team Brazil – Eliminated on Level 3
- Brian Redard, 30 Personal Trainer – Team USA – Eliminated on Level 3
- Taeyoon Kim, 26 Parkour Coach – Team Korea – Eliminated on Level 3
- Mitsuteru Tanaka, 28 Muscleman Entertainer – Team Japan – Eliminated on Level 2
- Woosung Yu, 35 Mixed Martial Arts Fighter – Team Korea – Eliminated on Level 2
- Keita Omura, 29 Jiu Jitsu Champion – Team Japan – Eliminated on Level 2
- Alexander Schmidt, 24 Professional Acrobat – Team Germany – Eliminated on Level 1
- Abe Green, 32 Graphic Designer – Team Mexico – Eliminated on Level 1
- Amancay Gonzalez, 26 Athletic Spokesperson – Team Mexico – Eliminated on Level 1
- Mirella Araujo, 39 Dancer – Team Brazil – Eliminated on Level 1

==== Level 1 ====
Competitor	Points	Time	Finish	Result
(South Korea) Taeyoon Kim	50	3:02	1st	Fell on the Energy Coils
(United States) Ken Corigliano	50	3:59	2nd	Fell on the Mag Wall
(Japan) Mitsuteru Tanaka	50	4:21	3rd	Fell on the Mag Wall
(Brazil) Bruno Nogueira	50	4:52	4th	Fell on the Mag Wall
(Germany) Nam Vo	50	5:26	5th	Fell on the Mag Wall
(United States) Brian Redard	40	2:43	6th	Fell on the Energy Coils
(Japan) Keita Omura	30	2:34	7th	Fell on Faceplant
(South Korea) Woosung Yu	30	2:46	8th	Fell on Faceplant
(Germany) Alexander Schmidt	30	2:53	9th	Fell on Faceplant
(Mexico) Abe Green	30	3:00	10th	Fell on Faceplant
(Mexico) Amancay “Macky” Gonzalez	30	5:54	11th	Timed out on Brain Matter
(Brazil) Mirella Araújo	10	0:45	12th	Fell on Mother Tongue

==== Level 2 ====
Competitor	Points	Time	Finish	Result
(South Korea) Taeyoon Kim	150	6:44	1st	Missed the jump to the Dreadmills
(United States) Ken Corigliano	150	6:56	2nd	Missed the jump to the Dreadmills
(Germany) Nam Vo	130	9:53	3rd	Voluntarily sunk in Digestive Track
(Brazil) Bruno Nogueira	110	7:29	4th	Sunk in Digestive Track
(United States) Brian Redard	100	5:05	5th	Sunk in Digestive Track
(Japan) Mitsuteru Tanaka	90	3:24	6th	Fell on Stomach Churn
(South Korea) Woosung Yu	70	8:41	7th	Fell on Stomach Churn
(Japan) Keita Omura	30	3:12	8th	Fell on Spinal Ascent

==== Level 3 ====
Competitor	Points	Time	Finish	Result
(United States) Ken Corigliano	280	11:12	1st	Fell on Weapon
(Germany) Nam Vo	180	12:48	2nd	Fell on Bungee Beds
(Brazil) Bruno Nogueira	170	7:51	3rd	Voluntarily sunk in Coil Crawl
(United States) Brian Redard	150	6:00	4th	Fell on Bungee Beds
(South Korea) Taeyoon Kim	150	6:44	5th	Missed the jump off the Ejector

==== Level 4 ====
Competitor	Points	Height	Finish	Result
(United States) Ken Corigliano	140	Ventilator	1st	Beastmaster
(Germany) Nam Vo	120	Grid Lock	2nd	Eliminated

=== Episode 10: Season 1 Finale ===
==== Competitors ====
- Felipe Camargo, 24 Professional Climber – Team Brazil – Ultimate Beastmaster
- Heeyoung Park, 34 Ice Climber – Team South Korea – Eliminated on Level 4
- Jonathan Collins, 33 Track Coach and Model – Team USA – Eliminated on Level 3
- Roberto Perez, 25 Chemical Engineering Student – Team Mexico – Eliminated on Level 2
- Hyunho Kim, 30 Crossfit Trainer – Team South Korea – Eliminated on Level 2
- Ken Corigliano, 35 Air Force Major – Team USA – Eliminated on Level 2
- Philip Meyer, 23 Soldier – Team Germany– Eliminated on Level 1
- Steven Tucker, 29 Rock Climbing Instructor – Team USA – Eliminated on Level 1
- David Manthei, 20 Architecture Student – Team Germany – Eliminated on Level 1

==== Level 1 ====
Competitor	Points	Time	Finish	Result
(Mexico) Roberto Perez	80	3:30	1st	Completed Level 1
(Brazil) Felipe Camargo	80	5:24	2nd	Completed Level 1
(South Korea) Heeyoung Park	80	5:40	3rd	Completed Level 1
(United States) Jonathan Collins	70	4:03	4th	Fell on the Mag Wall
(United States) Ken Corigliano	60	4:59	5th	Fell on the Mag Wall
(South Korea) Hyuhno Kim	50	2:58	6th	Fell on the Energy Coils
(Germany) Philip Meyer	50	3:18	7th	Fell on the Energy Coils
(United States) Steven Tucker	50	3:29	8th	Fell on the Mag Wall
(Germany) David Manthei	40	4:31	9th	Fell on the Energy Coils

==== Level 2 ====
Competitor	Points	Time	Finish	Result
(South Korea) Heeyong Park	200	6:12	1st	Missed the jump to Vertabrace
(United States) Jonathan Collins	190	4:56	2nd	Fell on Chain Reaction
(Brazil) Felipe Camargo	180	2:39	3rd	Voluntarily sunk in Digestive Track
(Mexico) Roberto Perez	140	Unk	4th	Fell on Stomach Churn
(South Korea) Hyunho Kim	50	Unk	5th	Fell on Spinal Ascent
(United States) Ken Corigliano	160	3:45	6th	Missed the jump to the Dreadmills with injury

==== Level 3 ====
Competitor	Points	Time	Finish	Result
(Brazil) Felipe Carmago	420	6:21	1st	Completed the Level 3 bonus obstacles
(South Korea) Heeyoung Park	410	5:54	2nd	Completed the Level 3 bonus obstacles
(United States) Jonathan Collins	360	6:59	3rd	Voluntarily stopped on Tricky Trapeze

==== Level 4 ====
Competitor	Points	Height	Finish	Result
(Brazil) Felipe Camargo	160	High Voltage (6:47)	1st	Ultimate Beastmaster
(South Korea) Heeyoung Park	160	High Voltage (6:49)	2nd	Eliminated after tiebreaker

== Broadcast ==
The show has six country-specific versions. These have separate hosts, and languages, with two competitors from each country competing in each of the first nine episodes of the series. The countries are the U.S., Brazil, South Korea, Mexico, Germany, and Japan.

The hosts for the show are Terry Crews and Charissa Thompson (U.S.); Anderson Silva and Rafinha Bastos (Brazil); Seo Kyung Suk and Park Kyeong Rim (South Korea); Ines Sainz and Luis Ernesto Franco (Mexico); Hans Sarpei and Luke Mockridge (Germany); and Sayaka Akimoto and Yuji Kondo (Japan).
