= Ultimate Beastmaster season 2 =

Season American competition reality television show Ultimate Beastmaster

Ultimate Beastmaster
- Season 2
- No. of contestants: 108
- Finals venue: Santa Clarita, California
- No. of episodes: 10

Release
- Original network: Netflix
- Original release: December 15, 2017

Season chronology
- ← Previous; Season 1 Next → Season 3

The second season of the American reality competition series Ultimate Beastmaster premiered exclusively via Netflix's web streaming service on December 15, 2017. The show consists of 10 Beastmaster episodes which were released simultaneously on Netflix worldwide. The show was filmed in Santa Clarita, California, over the course of eight nights.

== Hosts ==
For this season, there were 6 countries in the competition represented by 2 contestants per episode. Each country has their own set of two hosts/commentators for the competition. They are as follows:

Country	Host	
United States	Tiki Barber	Former NFL Player
United States	Chris Distefano	Comedian
Spain	Paula Vázquez	Television Host
Spain	Saúl Craviotto	Olympic Gold Medalist
France	Gilles Marini	Actor
France	Sandy Heribert	Sports Journalist
Italy	Francesco Facchinetti	DJ/Television Host
Italy	Bianca Balti	Model
China	Bin Gu	TV Personality
China	Qinyi Du	Television Host
India	Vidyut Jammwal	Actor
India	Sarah Jane Dias	Actress

Not only do each pair of hosts provide color commentary for each of the six localized versions, but the foreign commentators also make appearances in each localized version, with their commentary presented by subtitles. If a contestant completes a course, all hosts' reactions are shown on screen. Furthermore, since all host booths are placed in a row on the Ultimate Beastmaster set, commentators from one localization can easily walk over into the booth of another localized version.

== The Beast ==
The obstacle course for the competition is known as The Beast, and it is divided into 4 Levels. Competitors with the highest scores after each level move on while those with the lowest scores are eliminated. Unlike the previous season, scores accrue on all four levels, with ties decided in favor of the competitor with the lowest time. The obstacles are suspended over a body of red-tinted water referred to as Beast Blood (except for Level 3 which has blue-tinted water and is referred to as the Fuel of the Pyramid) and housed in a giant steel frame that takes the form of a large animal. A competitor is considered to have failed a Level if all four limbs are submerged into the Beast Blood/Fuel of the Pyramid. Failure ends the attempt at the current Level but confers no penalties. Competitors have 1,500 seconds (25 minutes) to complete all four levels.

=== Level 1 ===
In Level 1 all twelve competitors compete with the top eight scorers moving on.

- Bite Force - Competitors must scale a 30° platform leading to the Grinders.
- Grinders - Competitors must cross 3 gear-like platforms separated by 6 ft.
- Faceplant - Competitors stand on a narrow platform, hands braced against panels on either side, as they are tilted forward to a 45° angle. They must then jump to a chain and swing to the next obstacle. Unlike last season, the chain never becomes a rope at any point in the season.
- Energy Coils - Competitors must jump across a series of 5 semi-stationary hanging platforms at various heights. The first Point Thruster is located next to a side platform. The coils were placed farther apart for the finals. An additional coil is added if the second path is taken.

At the end of the Energy Coils, there are two different paths taken, depending on the episode.

Path 1

- Dead Bolts - Competitors must jump across a series of 4 semi-stationary hanging bolts. A Point Thruster is located underneath the second Deadbolt.
- Mag Wall - Competitors navigate horizontally across a climbing wall. Every 2 seconds (1 second for the finals) the magnetic handholds are released and fall into the Beast's blood. The wall features an inversion, from which the competitors must jump to the finishing platform, which is placed farther in the finals. The final Point Thruster is located toward the end of Mag Wall.

A perfect run will give you a score of 120 points.

Path 2

- Blue Energy Coils - Competitors must jump across a series of 5 additional semi-stationary hanging platforms, though unlike the regular Energy Coils, these are all at the same height and are closer to each other. A Point Thruster is located in between the first two blue coils.
- Sling Shot - Competitors must use their momentum to swing across a trapeze bar.
- Crash Pads - Similar to the Bungee Beds from season 1's Level 3, competitors must traverse two unstable platforms suspended at varying heights by bungee cords. The final Point Thruster is located in between the two Crash Pads.

Each individual portion of an obstacle is worth 5 points allowing for a possible total of 90 or 120 Points, depending on Beast configuration. A perfect run will give you a score of 130 points. Competitors have 360 seconds (6 minutes) to complete Level 1.

=== Level 2 ===
In Level 2 the top eight competitors compete, with the top five scorers moving on. All obstacles are lifted from the previous season.

- Spinal Ascent - Competitors must complete a series of vertical jumps, with the largest being 8 feet. Three platforms are fixed, while two are suspended.
- Spinal Descent - Competitors must work their way down through a cable web. A Point Thruster is located at the bottom.
- Stomach Churn - Competitors must traverse three spinning platforms all at varying heights and speeds. The speed of all platforms increases for the finals. A Point Thruster is located next to the second platform.
- Digestive Track - Jumping from the last spinning platform into a tube, competitors must climb the tube before it sinks and jump to the next obstacle. The tube sinks faster in the finals.
- Dreadmills - Competitors must cross a pair of suspended treadmills and leap to a platform.
- Chain Reaction - Competitors must swing across a series of hanging chains, which are farther for the finals. A Point Thruster is located midway across.
- Vertibrace - Competitors must hop through a series of five suspended vertebrae-shaped hoops and jump to the finish platform. A Point Thruster is located next to the second hoop.

Each individual portion of an obstacle is worth 5 points allowing for a possible total of 155 points. Competitors have 480 seconds (8 minutes) to complete Level 2.

=== Level 3 (Energy Pyramid) ===
In Level 3, also known as the Energy Pyramid, the top 5 scorers compete, with the top two advancing to the final level. Unlike the previous season, there are no bonus obstacles.

- The Ejector - Competitors must mount a 14 MPH (17 MPH for the finals) forward-moving treadmill and attempt to grab a suspended handhold (attached to Prism Strike).
- Prism Strike - Competitors must hold onto a handhold as it swings through a curved track, then reach for an additional handhold located just before the first Coil Crawl. A Point Thruster is located to the side of the first track.
- Coil Crawl - Competitors must work their way through three tubes structure made of pipe and chain before they each sink into the water. A Point Thruster is located after the first Coil Crawl. Each Coil Crawl sinks faster in the finals.
- Hangman- Competitors must scale 15 hanging, triangular rings which retract after a competitor lets go. A Point Thruster is located midway across.
- Pipeline - Competitors must use grip handles to slide up a set of V-shaped bars
- Climbing Wall - Competitors must climb a wall up to the final platform. A Point Thruster is located at the bottom of the wall.

Individual portions of obstacles are worth 5 points. The highest possible total is 155 points. 75 points are found in Hangman (80, including the point thruster). Competitors have 360 seconds (6 minutes) to complete Level 3.

=== Level 4 ===
In Level 4 the top two competitors face each other on an eighty-foot climbing wall. Unlike the previous season, scores from the previous levels are kept and there are no Power Taps.

- Ricochet - Competitors navigate back-and-forth between 2 walls.
- Full Tilt - Competitors must scale five blocks with two handholds which tilt down as they grab them.
- Mother Board - Competitors must ascend a large pegboard divided into two sections. Two Point Thrusters are located towards the top and bottom,
- Sky Hook - Competitors must cross six hooks with two handholds.
- Ventilator - Competitors must ascend a narrow vertical crevice. A Point Thruster is located midway up with a final Point Thruster at the top of this section worth 200 points.

Competitors are given five minutes to accrue the highest possible score, with ties decided in favor of the competitor who is currently highest on the tower. There is no failure condition for Level 4, and competitors may attempt to regain their footing if they lose grip on the wall.

== Episodes ==
The contestant was named Beastmaster.
The contestants completed that level.
The contestant was eliminated on that round.

=== Episode 1: The Beast Within ===
==== Competitors ====
- Mickaël Mawem, 26 Professional Boulderer - Team France - Beastmaster
- Bassa Mawem, 32 Professional Speed Climber - Team France - Eliminated on Level 4
- Luca Rinaldi, 26 Land Surveyor - Team Italy - Eliminated on Level 3
- Felix Chu, 33 Obstacle Course Racer - Team USA - Eliminated on Level 3
- Alex Segura, 22 Marketing Student - Team Spain - Eliminated on Level 3
- Dong Li, 25 Parkour Instructor - Team China - Eliminated on Level 2
- Gianni Guglielmo, 33 Taekwondo Champion - Team Italy - Eliminated on Level 2
- Vishwanath Bhaskar, 25 Powerlifting Champion - Team India - Eliminated on Level 2
- Vikas Krishan Yadav, 25 Olympic Boxer - Team India - Eliminated on Level 1
- Lorena González, 34 Nurse - Team Spain - Eliminated on Level 1
- Jessica Hill, 27 Professional Acrobat - Team USA - Eliminated on Level 1
- Dan Zeng, 39 Financial Advisor - Team China - Eliminated on Level 1

==== Level 1 ====
Competitor	Points	Time	Finish	Result
(France) Mickael Mawem	105	2:58	1st	Completed Level 1
(France) Bassa Mawem	105	3:02	2nd	Completed Level 1
(Italy) Luca Rinaldi	105	4:01	3rd	Completed Level 1
(China) Dong Li	80	3:27	4th	Missed the jump to the Mag Wall
(United States) Felix Chu	75	4:07	5th	Missed the jump to the Mag Wall
(Spain) Alex Segura	50	1:49	6th	Fell on the Energy Coils
(India) Vishwanath Bhaskar	35	1:47	7th	Fell on the Energy Coils
(Italy) Gianni Guglielmo	35	1:52	8th	Fell on the Energy Coils
(India) Vikas Yadav	25	1:19	9th	Fell on Faceplant
(Spain) Lorena Gonzalez	10	0:22	10th	Fell on the Grinders
(United States) Jessica Hill	10	0:26	11th	Fell on the Grinders
(China) Dan Zeng	10	0:34	12th	Fell on the Grinders

==== Level 2 ====
Competitor	Points	Time	Finish	Result
(France) Mickaël Mawem	250	5:50	1st	Completed Level 2
(France) Bassa Mawem	210	7:45	2nd	Fell on Chain Reaction
(Italy) Luca Rinaldi	165	3:14	3rd	Missed the jump to the Dreadmills
(United States) Felix Chu	145	2:47	4th	Missed the jump off the Dreadmills
(Spain) Alex Segura	130	3:05	5th	Fell on Chain Reaction
(China) Dong Li	120	1:24	6th	Fell on Stomach Churn
(Italy) Gianni Guglielmo	95	3:55	7th	Voluntarily sunk in Digestive Track
(India) Vishwanath Bhaskar	45	2:27	8th	Fell on Spinal Ascent

==== Level 3 ====
Competitor	Points	Time	Finish	Result
(France) Mickaël Mawem	345	4:14	1st	Fell on Hangman
(France) Bassa Mawem	335	2:49	2nd	Fell on Pipeline
(Italy) Luca Rinaldi	205	1:42	3rd	Fell on Hangman
(United States) Felix Chu	150	2:32	4th	Fell on Prism Strike
(Spain) Alex Segura	145	1:05	5th	Fell on Prism Strike

==== Level 4 ====
Competitor	Points	Height	Finish	Result
(France) Mickaël Mawem	640	Completed Level 4	1st	Beastmaster
(France) Bassa Mawem	420	Completed Level 4	2nd	Eliminated

=== Episode 2: Out for Blood ===
==== Competitors ====
- Haibin Qu, 24 Rock Climbing Instructor - Team China - Beastmaster
- Miguel Espada, 24 Stuntman - Team Spain - Eliminated on Level 4
- Remi Fantino, 30 Dentist - Team France - Eliminated on Level 3
- Gabe Baker, 25 Civil Engineer - Team USA - Eliminated on Level 3
- Laura Mété, 28 Pole Dance Instructor - Team France - Eliminated on Level 3
- Antonio Bosso, 21 Youth Leader - Team Italy - Eliminated on Level 2
- Natalie Strasser, 31 Stuntwoman - Team USA - Eliminated on Level 2
- Sumir Kapoor, 25 B-Boy Dancer - Team India - Eliminated on Level 2
- Peng Wu, 27 Personal Trainer - Team China - Eliminated on Level 1
- Lluís Barbé, 35 Physiotherapist - Team Spain - Eliminated on Level 1
- Aditya Shroff, 38 Film Distributor - Team India - Eliminated on Level 1
- Arianna Bonardi, 25 Bodybuilder - Team Italy - Eliminated on Level 1

==== Level 1 ====
Competitor	Points	Time	Finish	Result
(United States) Gabe Baker	120	4:43	1st	Completed Level 1
(Spain) Miguel Espada	120	5:41	2nd	Completed Level 1
(France) Remi Fantino	85	3:58	3rd	Fell on the Crash Pads
(China) Haibin Qu	85	4:49	4th	Fell on the Crash Pads
(United States) Natalie Strasser	40	3:22	5th	Fell on the Energy Coils
(Italy) Antonio Bosso	35	1:02	6th	Fell on the Energy Coils
(France) Laura Mété	35	1:48	7th	Fell on the Energy Coils
(India) Sumir Kapoor	30	2:47	8th	Fell on Faceplant
(China) Peng Wu	25	2:02	9th	Fell on Faceplant
(Spain) Lluís Barbé	25	2:14	10th	Fell on Faceplant
(India) Aditya Shroff	5	0:22	11th	Touched the black mat under the Grinders
(Italy) Arianna Bonardi	5	2:39	12th	Fell on the chain leading to the Grinders

==== Level 2 ====
Competitor	Points	Time	Finish	Result
(China) Haibin Qu	230	7:06	1st	Completed Level 2
(Spain) Miguel Espada	190	2:46	2nd	Missed the jump off the Dreadmills
(France) Remi Fatino	155	3:12	3rd	Missed the jump off the Dreadmills
(United States) Gabe Baker	135	2:30	4th	Fell on Spinal Ascent
(France) Laura Mété	95	3:05	5th	Voluntarily sunk in Digestive Track
(Italy) Antonio Bosso	80	3:13	6th	Fell out of the Digestive Track
(United States) Natalie Strasser	55	5:27	7th	Fell on Spinal Ascent
(India) Sumir Kapoor	40	3:22	8th	Fell on Spinal Ascent

==== Level 3 ====
Competitor	Points	Time	Finish	Result
(China) Haibin Qu	370	7:37	1st	Completed Level 3
(Spain) Miguel Espada	210	1:07	2nd	Sunk in Coil Crawl
(United States) Gabe Baker	160	1:03	3rd	Missed the jump to the third coil in Coil Crawl
(France) Remi Fatino	155	Unk	4th	Missed the jump off the Ejector
(France) Laura Mété	115	1:26	5th	Voluntarily sunk in Coil Crawl

==== Level 4 ====
Competitor	Points	Height	Finish	Result
(China) Haibin Qu	665	Completed Level 4	1st	Beastmaster
(Spain) Miguel Espada	250	Ricochet	2nd	Eliminated

=== Episode 3: Taming the Beast ===
==== Competitors ====
- Kyle Soderman, 22 Obstacle Course Coach - Team USA - Beastmaster
- Yoann Leroux, 30 Professional Freerunner - Team France - Eliminated on Level 4
- Yunpeng Zhang, 23 Stuntman - Team China - Eliminated on Level 3
- Tiziano Battista, 27 Body Shop Mechanic - Team Italy - Eliminated on Level 3
- Rishi Prasad, 27 ER Doctor - Team India - Eliminated on Level 3
- Aitor Dominguez, 30 Physiotherapist - Team Spain - Eliminated on Level 2
- Jeremey Adam Rey, 23 Dance Instructor - Team USA - Eliminated on Level 2
- Lisa Sarcinelli, 35 Parkour Gym Owner - Team Italy - Eliminated on Level 2
- Francisco Gascó, 32 Paleontologist - Team Spain - Eliminated on Level 1
- Mathilde Becerra, 25 Professional Climber - Team France - Eliminated on Level 1
- Feng Wan, 36 Climbing Gym Manager - Team China - Eliminated on Level 1
- Urmi Kothari, 31 Fitness Trainer - Team India - Eliminated on Level 1

==== Level 1 ====
Level 1 Configuration: Bite Force, Grinders, Faceplant, Energy Coils, Dead Bolts, Mag Wall

Competitor	Points	Time	Finish	Result
(United States) Kyle Soderman	120	4:01	1st	Cleared Level 1
(France) Yoann Leroux	50	1:28	2nd	Fell on the Energy Coils
(United States) Jeremy Adam Rey	50	2:30	3rd	Fell on the Energy Coils
(India) Rishi Prasad	40	1:36	4th	Fell on the Energy Coils
(Italy) Tiziano Battista	40	2:23	5th	Fell on the Energy Coils
(Spain) Aitor Dominguez	35	1:00	6th	Fell on the Energy Coils
(China) Yunpeng Zhang	35	1:20	7th	Fell on the Energy Coils
(Italy) Lisa Sarcinelli	35	2:43	8th	Fell on the Energy Coils
(Spain) Francisco Gascó	15	1:13	9th	Fell on the Grinders
(France) Mathilde Becerra	10	0:43	10th	Fell on the Grinders
(China) Feng Wan	10	0:51	11th	Fell on the Grinders
(India) Urmi Kothari	10	0:55	12th	Fell on the Grinders

==== Level 2 ====
Competitor	Points	Time	Finish	Result
(United States) Kyle Soderman	270	4:45	1st	Completed Level 2
(France) Yoann Leroux	155	3:23	2nd	Fell on Chain Reaction
(China) Yunpeng Zhang	90	2:10	3rd	Fell out of Digestive Track
(Italy) Tiziano Battista	90	2:44	4th	Missed the jump to the Dreadmills
(India) Rishi Prasad	85	3:35	5th	Got caught in Digestive Track
(Spain) Aitor Dominguez	80	2:37	6th	Fell out of Digestive Track
(United States) Jeremy Adam Ray	65	3:04	7th	Fell on Spinal Ascent
(Italy) Lisa Sarcinelli	45	0:44	8th	Fell on Spinal Ascent

==== Level 3 ====
Competitor	Points	Time	Finish	Result
(United States) Kyle Soderman	350	2:49	1st	Fell on Hangman
(France) Yoann Leroux	180	1:20	2nd	Sunk in Coil Crawl
(China) Yunpeng Zhang	115	1:14	3rd	Voluntarily sunk in Coil Crawl
(Italy) Tiziano Battista	90	0:06	4th	Missed the jump off the Ejector
(India) Rishi Prasad	85	0:04	5th	Missed the jump to the first hand-hold

==== Level 4 ====
Competitor	Points	Height	Finish	Result
(United States) Kyle Soderman	440	Ventilator	1st	Beastmaster
(France) Yoann Leroux	215	Motherboard	2nd	Eliminated

=== Episode 4: The Heart of the Beast ===
==== Competitors ====
- Yiqi Li, 24 Parkour Instructor - Team China - Beastmaster
- Brian Ludovici, 19 Physics Student - Team USA - Eliminated on Level 4
- Alex Picazo, 31 Wrestling Coach - Team USA - Eliminated on Level 3
- Mujahid Habib, 24 Architect - Team India - Eliminated on Level 3
- Valentin Dubois, 25 Parkour Athlete - Team France - Eliminated on Level 3
- Jianguo Fang, 27 Personal Trainer - Team China - Eliminated on Level 2
- Matteo Della Bordella, 32 Professional Alpinist - Team Italy - Eliminated on Level 2
- Raúl Beltrán, 28 Navy Search and Rescue - Team Spain - Eliminated on Level 2
- TJ García, 34 Physiotherapist - Team Spain - Eliminated on Level 1
- Ritesh Shaiwal, 29 Mountaineer - Team India - Eliminated on Level 1
- Sandra Large, 33 Nanny - Team France - Eliminated on Level 1
- Serena Jura, 30 Obstacle Race Trainer - Team Italy - Eliminated on Level 1

==== Level 1 ====
Competitor	Points	Time	Finish	Result
(United States) Brian Ludovici	125	6:00	1st	Timed out on the Crash Pads
(India) Mujahid Habib	110	6:00	2nd	Fell on the Crash Pads
(China) Yiqi Li	105	5:08	3rd	Completed Level 1
(France) Valentin Dubois	95	3:33	4th	Missed the jump to the Crash Pads
(United States) Alex Picazo	90	5:25	5th	Fell on the Blue Energy Coils
(China) Jianguo Fung	85	4:01	6th	Fell on the Crash Pads
(Italy) Matteo Della Bordella	80	3:30	7th	Missed the jump to the Crash Pads
(Spain) Raúl Beltrán	80	4:02	8th	Missed the jump to the Crash Pads
(Spain) TJ García	80	6:00	9th	Timed out on Sling Shot
(India) Ritesh Shaiwal	80	6:00	10th	Timed out on Sling Shot
(France) Sandra Large	25	2:19	11th	Fell on Faceplant
(Italy) Serena Jura	25	3:06	12th	Fell on Faceplant

==== Level 2 ====
Competitor	Points	Time	Finish	Result
(China) Yiqi Li	250	6:24	1st	Completed Level 2
(United States) Brian Ludovici	195	3:39	2nd	Voluntarily sunk in Digestive Track
(United States) Alex Picazo	195	6:27	3rd	Fell on Chain Reaction
(India) Mujahid Habib	170	4:04	4th	Missed the jump to the Dreadmills
(France) Valentin Dubois	145	2:05	5th	Fell on Stomach Churn
(China) Jianguo Fang	140	2:37	6th	Fell out of Digestive Track
(Italy) Matteo Della Bordella	140	2:41	7th	Missed the jump to the Dreadmills
(Spain) Raúl Betrán	135	2:35	8th	Fell out of Digestive Track

==== Level 3 ====
Competitor	Points	Time	Finish	Result
(China) Yiqi Li	250	Unk	1st	Missed the jump off the Ejector
(United States) Brian Ludovici	225	1:26	2nd	Missed the jump to Hangman
(United States) Alex Picazo	215	2:58	3rd	Missed the jump to the third coil in Coil Crawl
(India) Mujahid Habib	200	1:02	4th	Missed the jump to the third coil in Coil Crawl
(France) Valentin Dubois	170	Unk	5th	Fell on Coil Crawl

==== Level 4 ====
Competitor	Points	Height	Finish	Result
(China) Yiqi Li	325	Ventillator	1st	Beastmaster
(United States) Brian Ludovici	295	Sky Hook	2nd	Eliminated

=== Episode 5: The Beast Gets Schooled ===
==== Competitors ====
- John Gerzik, 31 High School Physics Teacher - Team USA - Beastmaster
- Alberto Cipriano, 22 Optometrist - Team Italy - Eliminated on Level 4
- Shuai Tian, 32 Noodle Bar Owner - Team China - Eliminated on Level 3
- Cyrus Khan, 20 Physics Student - Team India - Eliminated on Level 3
- Lorenzo Russo, 29 Tattoo Artist - Team Italy - Eliminated on Level 2
- Jiebin Huang, 20 Kinesiology Student - Team China - Eliminated on Level 2
- Crystal Demopoulos, 28 MMA Fighter - Team USA - Eliminated on Level 2
- Pedro Carrasco, 31 Aerial Acrobat - Team Spain - Eliminated on Level 2 with Injury
- Claire Buat, 23 Parkour Teacher - Team France - Eliminated on Level 1
- Remi Papalia, 28 Firefighter - Team France - Eliminated on Level 1
- Andrea Montero, 25 OCR Athlete - Team Spain - Eliminated on Level 1
- Neeraj Goyat, 24 Boxer - Team India - Eliminated on Level 1

==== Level 1 ====
Competitor	Points	Time	Finish	Result
(United States) John Gerzik	120	05:11	1st	Completed Level 1
(Italy) Alberto Cipriano	95	04:45	2nd	Completed Level 1
(China) Shuai Tian	80	05:18	3rd	Missed the jump to the Crash Pads
(Italy) Lorenzo Russo	80	05:42	4th	Missed the jump to the Crash Pads
(Spain) Pedro Carrasco	80	5:54	5th	Missed the jump to the Crash Pads
(India) Cyrus Khan	80	5:57	6th	Missed the jump to the Crash Pads
(China) Jiebin Huang	40	2:35	7th	Fell on the Energy Coils
(United States) Crystal Demopoulos	35	2:13	8th	Fell on the Energy Coils
(France) Claire Buat	35	2:18	9th	Fell on the Energy Coils
(France) Remi Papalia	25	1:10	10th	Fell on Faceplant
(Spain) Andrea Montero	25	1:22	11th	Fell on Faceplant
(India) Neeraj Goyat	25	1:28	12th	Fell on Faceplant

==== Level 2 ====
Competitor	Points	Time	Finish	Result
(United States) John Gerzik	205	5:03	1st	Missed the jump to Chain Reaction
(Italy) Alberto Cipriano	200	4:57	2nd	Fell on Chain Reaction
(China) Shuai Tian	175	7:59	3rd	Fell on Chain Reaction
(India) Cyrus Khan	150	3:11	4th	Missed the jump off the Dreadmills
(Italy) Lorenzo Russo	95	7:27	5th	Fell on Spinal Ascent
(China) Jiebin Huang	90	4:21	6th	Fell on Stomach Churn
(United States) Crystal Demopoulus	45	3:53	7th	Fell on Spinal Ascent
(Spain) Pedro Carrasco	160	7:26	8th	Fell on Chain Reaction with injury

==== Level 3 ====
Competitor	Points	Time	Finish	Result
(United States) John Gerzik	260	1:38	1st	Voluntarily fell on Hangman
(Italy) Alberto Cipriano	215	3:30	2nd	Fell on Prism Strike
(China) Shuai Tian	195	1:03	3rd	Voluntarily sunk in Coil Crawl
(India) Cyrus Khan	170	2:56	4th	Missed the jump to the third coil in Coil Crawl

==== Level 4 ====
Competitor	Points	Height	Finish	Result
(United States) John Gerzik	335	Sky Hook	1st	Beastmaster
(Italy) Alberto Cipriano	250	Motherboard	2nd	Eliminated

=== Episode 6: The Battle Rages On ===
==== Competitors ====
- Bin Xie, 24 Ex-Navy Special Ops - Team China - Beastmaster
- Clément Dumais, 23 Parkour Athlete - Team France - Eliminated on Level 4
- Marc Vela, 22 Pole Vault Champion - Team Spain - Eliminated on Level 3
- Minghua He (Andy), 20 Business Student - Team China - Eliminated on Level 3
- Giles D'Souza, 27 Special Forces Trainer - Team India - Eliminated on Level 3
- Andres Encinales, 28 MMA Fighter/Naval Officer - Team USA - Eliminated on Level 2
- Samuel Muñoz, 40 Firefighter - Team Spain - Eliminated on Level 2
- Abhinav Mahajan, 25 Motivational Speaker - Team India - Eliminated on Level 1 with Injury
- Myra Robinson, 34 Foster Parent - Team USA - Eliminated on Level 1
- Aude Brignone, 24 IT Saleswoman - Team France - Eliminated on Level 1
- Francesca Indelicato, 21 Wrestler - Team Italy - Eliminated on Level 1
- Pietro Lalla, 43 Hip Hop Dancer - Team Italy - Eliminated on Level 1

5:00 Time Limit on Level 4

==== Level 1 ====
Competitor	Points	Time	Finish	Result
(France) Clèment Dumais	115	2:58	1st	Fell on the Mag Wall
(China) Bin Xie	100	4:09	2nd	Fell on the Mag Wall
(Spain) Marc Vela	70	3:13	3rd	Fell on the Deadbolts
(India) Giles D'Souza	65	2:09	4th	Fell on the Deadbolts
(China) Minghua He (Andy)	65	2:42	5th	Fell on the Deadbolts
(India) Abhinav Mahajan	65	6:00	6th	Timed out on the Dead Bolts with injury
(United States) Andreas Encinales	35	1:50	7th	Fell on the Energy Coils
(Spain) Samuel Munoz	35	2:05	8th	Fell on the Energy Coils
(United States) Myra Robinson	15	0:32	9th	Fell on the Grinders
(Italy) Pietro Lalla	10	0:20	10th	Fell on the Grinders
(France) Aude Brignone	10	0:21	11th	Fell on the Grinders
(Italy) Francesca Indelicato	10	0:37	12th	Fell on the Grinders

==== Level 2 ====
Competitor	Points	Time	Finish	Result
(France) Clèment Dumais	210	3:06	1st	Fell on Chain Reaction
(China) Bin Xie	205	4:04	2nd	Fell on Chain Reaction
(Spain) Marc Vela	115	1:44	3rd	Fell out of Digestive Track
(China) Minghua Hue (Andy)	115	3:43	4th	Voluntarily sunk in Digestive Track
(India) Giles D'Souza	105	3:33	5th	Fell on Spinal Descent
(United States) Andreas Encinales	95	2:47	6th	Missed the Jump to the Dreadmills
(Spain) Samuel Muñoz	85	3:03	7th	Fell on Stomach Churn

==== Level 3 ====
Competitor	Points	Time	Finish	Result
(France) Clèment Dumais	245	1:08	1st	Fell transitioning to Hangman
(China) Bin Xie	240	1:24	2nd	Fell transitioning to Hangman
(Spain) Marc Vela	115	0:03	3rd	Missed the jump off the Ejector
(China) Minghua Hue (Andy)	115	0:04	4th	Missed the jump off the Ejector
(India) Giles D'Souza	105	0:03	5th	Missed the jump off the Ejector

==== Level 4 ====
Competitor	Points	Height	Finish	Result
(China) Bin Xie	295	Sky Hook	1st	Beastmaster
(France) Clèment Dumais	285	Motherboard	2nd	Eliminated

=== Episode 7: Scaling the Beast ===
==== Competitors ====
- Manuel Cornu, 22 Professional Boulderer - Team France - Beastmaster
- Axel Dupre, 28 Parkour Instructor - Team France - Eliminated on Level 4
- Juan Andres Villa, 34 Wind Turbine Technician - Team Spain - Eliminated on Level 3
- Gabriele Consentino, 26 Professional Swimmer - Team Italy - Eliminated on Level 3
- Praveen CM, 31 Rock Climbing Instructor - Team India - Eliminated on Level 3
- Alejandro Valdivia, 35 Chef - Team USA - Eliminated on Level 2
- Kraig Shorter, 32 Church Worship Leader - Team USA - Eliminated on Level 2
- Hao Zhao, 32 Marketing Executive - Team China - Eliminated on Level 2
- Chopsy Singh, 30 Fashion Designer - Team India - Eliminated on Level 1
- Nerea Povedano, 32 Ballet Dancer - Team Spain - Eliminated on Level 1
- Changying Wang, 33 Insurance Sales - Team China - Eliminated on Level 1
- Anna Aita, 29 Pole Dancer - Team Italy - Eliminated on Level 1

==== Level 1 ====
Competitor	Points	Time	Finish	Result
(France) Axel Dupre	95	3:04	1st	Completed Level 1
(United States) Alejandro Valdivia	95	5:57	2nd	Fell on the Crash Pads
(United States) Kraig Shorter	90	5:00	3rd	Missed the Jump to the Crash Pads
(Spain) Juan Andreas Villa	80	4:08	4th	Missed the Jump to the Crash Pads
(Italy) Gabriele Consentino	80	6:00	5th	Timed out on Sling Shot
(France) Manuel Cornu	75	2:58	6th	Fell on the Blue Energy Coils
(China) Hao Zhao	40	3:51	7th	Fell on the Energy Coils
(India) Praveen CM	40	4:08	8th	Fell on the Energy Coils
(India) Chopsy Singh	35	2:12	9th	Fell on the Energy Coils
(Spain) Nerea Povedano	25	2:02	10th	Fell on Faceplant
(China) Changying Wang	25	3:03	11th	Fell on Faceplant
(Italy) Anna Aita	10	1:14	12th	Fell on the Grinders

==== Level 2 ====
Competitor	Points	Time	Finish	Result
(France) Axel Dupre	190	4:52	1st	Fell on Chain Reaction
(France) Manuel Cornu	180	5:32	2nd	Fell on Chain Reaction
(Spain) Juan Andreas Villa	165	5:04	3rd	Fell on Chain Reaction
(Italy) Gabriele Consentino	120	4:08	4th	Fell on Spinal Descent
(India) Praveen CM	110	6:04	5th	Missed the Jump off the Dreadmills
(United States) Alejandro Valdivia	105	3:38	6th	Fell on Spinal Ascent
(United States) Kraig Shorter	105	4:26	7th	Fell on Spinal Ascent
(China) Hao Zhao	85	4:01	8th	Fell on Stomach Churn

==== Level 3 ====
Competitor	Points	Time	Finish	Result
(France) Manuel Cornu	315	5:59	1st	Completed Level 3
(France) Axel Dupre	225	3:35	2nd	Fell on hangman
(Spain) Juan Andres Villa	170	3:34	3rd	Fell on Prism Strike
(Italy) Gabriele Consentino	145	1:12	4th	Voluntarily sunk in Coil Crawl
(India) Praveen CM	110	0:03	5th	Missed the jump off Ejector

==== Level 4 ====
Competitor	Points	Height	Finish	Result
(France) Manuel Cornu	610	Completed Level 4	1st	Beastmaster
(France) Axel Dupre	285	Sky Hook	2nd	Eliminated

=== Episode 8: Trapping the Beast ===
==== Competitors ====
- Bin Fang, 24 Online Retailer - Team China - Beastmaster
- Jian Cui, 26 Stuntman - Team China - Eliminated on Level 4
- Léopold Hurbin, 23 Parkour Athlete - Team France - Eliminated on Level 3
- Luke Russell, 28 Air Force Medic- Team USA - Eliminated on Level 3
- Grégoire Rezzonico, 23 Obstacle Course Racer - Team France - Eliminated on Level 3
- Alejandra de Castro, 36 OCR Coach - Team Spain - Eliminated on Level 2
- Mauro Pala, 30 Breakdance Instructor - Team Italy - Eliminated on Level 2
- Delson D'Sousa, 28 Stunt Coordinator - Team India - Eliminated on Level 2
- Pablo Sendra, 28 Physical Education Teacher - Team Spain - Eliminated on Level 1
- Alan Rimondi, 28 Personal Trainer - Team Italy - Eliminated on Level 1
- Amanda Cass, 27 Karate Instructor - Team USA - Eliminated on Level 1
- Shruti Kotwal, 24 Speed Skater - Team India - Eliminated on Level 1

==== Level 1 ====
Competitor	Points	Time	Finish	Result
(China) Bin Fang	105	2:55	1st	Completed Level 1
(France) Leopold Hurbin	90	3:20	2nd	Fell on the Mag Wall
(United States) Luke Russell	75	3:24	3rd	Missed the Jump to the Mag Wall
(China) Jian Cui	65	1:55	4th	Fell on the Deadbolts
(France) Gregoire Rezzonico	35	1:20	5th	Fell on the Energy Coils
(Spain) Alejandra De Castro	35	1:45	6th	Fell on the Energy Coils
(Italy) Mauro Pala	35	2:27	7th	Fell on the Energy Coils
(India) Delson D’Souza	30	2:43	8th	Fell on Faceplant
(Spain) Pablo Sendra	25	1:12	9th	Fell on Faceplant
(Italy) Alan Rimondi	25	2:09	10th	Fell on Faceplant
(United States) Amanda Cass	25	2:12	11th	Fell on Faceplant
(India) Shruti Kotwal	10	1:13	12th	Fell on the Grinders

==== Level 2 ====
Competitor	Points	Time	Finish	Result
(China) Bin Fang	200	6:57	1st	Fell on Chain Reaction
(China) Jian Cui	160	4:58	2nd	Fell on Chain Reaction
(France) Léopold Hurbin	135	3:29	3rd	Fell on Stomach Churn
(United States) Luke Russell	130	3:09	4th	Fell out of Digestive Track
(France) Grégoire Rezzonico	85	3:40	5th	Fell on Stomach Churn
(Spain) Alejandra De Castro	80	2:26	6th	Fell on Stomach Churn
(Italy) Mauro Pala	75	2:30	7th	Fell on Stomach Churn
(India) Delson D’Souza	75	3:49	8th	Fell on Stomach Churn

==== Level 3 ====
Competitor	Points	Time	Finish	Result
(China) Bin Fang	255	2:41	1st	Fell on Hangman
(China) Jian Cui	185	1:17	2nd	Missed the Jump to Hangman
(France) Léopold Hurbin	185	1:48	3rd	Fell on Hangman
(United States) Luke Russell	165	1:27	4th	Sunk in Coil Crawl
(France) Grégoire Rezzonico	100	1:07	5th	Sunk in Coil Crawl

==== Level 4 ====
Competitor	Points	Height	Finish	Result
(China) Bin Fang	335	Sky Hook	1st	Beastmaster
(China) Jian Cui	220	Motherboard	2nd	Eliminated

=== Episode 9: Making the Cut ===
==== Competitors ====
- Alberto Gotta, 24 Robotics Engineering Student - Team Italy - Beastmaster
- Mehdi Hadim, 21 Economics Student - Team France - Eliminated on Level 4
- Alessio Recchiuto, 20 Street Artist - Team Italy - Eliminated on Level 3
- Nabil Hadim, 21 Acrobat - Team France - Eliminated on Level 3
- Jorge Martin, 23 Teacher - Team Spain - Eliminated on Level 3
- Julio Montenegro Jr., 21 Motivational Speaker - Team USA - Eliminated on Level 2
- Colt Scott, 22 Poly-Sci Student - Team USA - Eliminated on Level 2
- Nupur Shikhare, 30 Celebrity Fitness Trainer - Team India - Eliminated on Level 2
- Biligetu Zhang, 26 Fitness Coach - Team China - Eliminated on Level 1
- Shweta Mehta, 28 Bikini Fitness Model - Team India - Eliminated on Level 1
- Miriam Gutiérrez, 33 Boxer - Team Spain - Eliminated on Level 1
- Bin Xu, 34 Ad Agency Copywriter - Team China - Eliminated on Level 1

==== Level 1 ====
Competitor	Points	Time	Finish	Result
(France) Mehdi Hadim	120	5:18	1st	Completed Level 1
(Italy) Alessio Recchiuto	110	4:59	2nd	Completed Level 1
(France) Nabil Hadim	110	4:31	3rd	Completed Level 1
(Spain) Jorge Martin	95	3:58	4th	Missed the jump to the Crash Pads
(United States) Julio Montenegro Jr.	95	4:00	5th	Completed Level 1
(Italy) Alberto Gotta	80	4:36	6th	Missed the jump to the Crash Pads
(United States) Colt Scott	75	4:02	7th	Fell on the Blue Energy Coils
(India) Nupur Shikhare	45	2:47	8th	Fell on the Blue Energy Coils
(China) Biligetu Zhang	35	1:55	9th	Fell on the Energy Coils
(India) Shweta Mehta	25	4:29	10th	Fell on Faceplant
(Spain) Miriam Gutiérrez	10	0:26	11th	Fell on the Grinders
(China) Bin Xu	10	0:34	12th	Fell on the Grinders

==== Level 2 ====
Competitor	Points	Time	Finish	Result
(France) Medhi Hadim	255	5:26	1st	Completed Level 2
(France) Nabil Hadim	205	3:41	2nd	Fell on Chain Reaction
(Italy) Alessio Recchiuto	205	3:49	3rd	Fell on Chain Reaction
(Spain) Jorge Martin	190	6:46	4th	Fell on Chain Reaction
(Italy) Alberto Gotta	175	5:21	5th	Fell on Chain Reaction
(United States) Julio Montenegro Jr.	165	3:32	6th	Missed the Jump off the Dreadmills
(United States) Colt Scott	135	2:40	7th	Fell on the Dreadmills
(India) Nupur Shikhare	60	3:43	8th	Fell on Spinal Ascent

==== Level 3 ====
Competitor	Points	Time	Finish	Result
(France) Mehdi Hadim	285	1:56	1st	Voluntarily fell on Hangman
(Italy) Alberto Gotta	270	3:33	2nd	Fell on Hangman
(Italy) Alessio Recchiuto	230	3:52	3rd	Missed the jump to Hangman
(France) Nabil Hadim	230	Unk	4th	Voluntarily sunk in Coil Crawl
(Spain) Jorge Martin	225	2:45	5th	Missed the jump to Hangman

==== Level 4 ====
Competitor	Points	Height	Finish	Result
(Italy) Alberto Gotta	360	Ventillator	1st	Beastmaster
(France) Mehdi Hadim	340	Sky Hook	2nd	Eliminated

=== Episode 10: A Beastmaster Is Crowned ===
==== Competitors ====
- Haibin Qu- Episode 2 - Ultimate Beastmaster
- Manuel Cornu- Episode 7 - Eliminated on Level 4
- Kyle Soderman- Episode 3 - Eliminated on Level 3
- John Gerzik- Episode 5 - Eliminated on Level 3
- Yiqi Li- Episode 4 - Eliminated on Level 2
- Bin Fang- Episode 8 - Eliminated on Level 2
- Bin Xie- Episode 6 - Eliminated on Level 1
- Mickael Mawem- Episode 1 - Eliminated on Level 1
- Alberto Gotta- Episode 9 - Eliminated on Level 1

==== Level 1 ====
Competitor	Points	Time	Finish	Result
(United States) Kyle Soderman	120	3:24	1st	Completed Level 1
(United States) John Gerzik	110	3:50	2nd	Completed Level 1
(China) Haibin Qu	105	4:00	3rd	Completed Level 1
(France) Manuel Cornu	100	3:40	4th	Missed the jump to the final platform
(China) Yiqi Li	90	2:58	5th	Missed the jump to the final platform
(China) Bin Fang	80	3:23	6th	Fell on the Deadbolts
(China) Bin Xie	80	3:53	7th	Missed the jump to the final platform
(France) Mickael Mawem	35	1:04	8th	Fell on the Energy Coils
(Italy) Alberto Gotta	35	1:34	9th	Fell on the Energy Coils

==== Level 2 ====
Competitor	Points	Time	Finish	Result
(China) Haibin Qu	240	5:49	1st	Completed Level 2
(United States) Kyle Soderman	235	3:50	2nd	Fell on Chain Reaction
(France) Manuel Cornu	230	6:35	3rd	Completed Level 2
(United States) John Gerzik	215	3:35	4th	Missed the jump to Vertabrace
(China) Yiqi Li	195	5:33	5th	Fell on Chain Reaction
(China) Bin Fang	140	2:45	6th	Missed the jump off the Dreadmills

==== Level 3 ====
Competitor	Points	Time	Finish	Result
(China) Haibin Qu	380	3:21	1st	Completed Level 3
(France) Manuel Cornu	370	4:31	2nd	Completed Level 3
(United States) Kyle Soderman	310	1:48	3rd	Fell on Hangman
(United States) John Gerzik	285	2:17	4th	Fell on Hangman

==== Level 4 ====
Competitor	Points	Height	Finish	Result
(China) Haibin Qu	675	Completed Level 4	1st	Ultimate Beastmaster
(France) Manuel Cornu	470	Ventillator	2nd	Runner-Up

== Broadcast ==
The show has six country-specific versions. These have separate hosts, and languages, with two competitors from each country competing in each of the first nine episodes of the series. The countries are the U.S., Spain, France, Italy, China, and India.

The hosts for the show are Tiki Barber and Chris Distefano (U.S.); Paula Vázquez and Saúl Craviotto (Spain); Gilles Marini and Sandy Heribert (France); Francesco Facchinetti and Bianca Balti (Italy); Bin Gu and Qinyi Du (China); and Vidyut Jammwal and Sarah Jane Dias (India).
