= Nick Cummins =

Australian rugby union player

- Born: Nicholas Mark Cummins; 5 October 1987 (age 39) Port Macquarie, New South Wales, Australia
- Height: 189 cm (6 ft 2 in)
- Weight: 99 kg (15 st 8 lb; 218 lb)
- School: St Francis College, Crestmead

Rugby union career
- Position: Wing / Centre
Amateur team(s)
| Years | Team | Apps | (Points) |
| 2007–2009 | Randwick | | |
| 2012 | Southern Districts | 2 | (5) |
| 2014 | Barbarians | 1 | (5) |
Senior career
| Years | Team | Apps | (Points) |
| 2007 | Perth Spirit | 7 | (10) |
| 2014–2016 | Coca-Cola Red Sparks | 18 | (0) |
- Correct as of 23 January 2016
Super Rugby
| Years | Team | Apps | (Points) |
| 2008–2015 | Western Force | 87 | (85) |
- Correct as of 12 June 2015
International career
| Years | Team | Apps | (Points) |
| 2012–2014 | Australia | 15 | (30) |
- Correct as of 21 June 2014
National sevens team
| Years | Team | | Comps |
| 2007–2016 | Australia sevens | | 35 |
- Correct as of 21 May 2016

Official website
- https://www.nickcummins.com.au/
Medal record
Men's rugby sevens
Representing Australia
Commonwealth Games
| Silver medal – second place | 2010 Delhi | Team competition |

Nicholas Mark Cummins (born 5 October 1987), known by his nickname Honey Badger after the mammal of the same name, is an Australian Former professional Rugby Union Player and advertiser for Tradie underwear.

Cummins' nickname was bestowed on him after he drew inspiration from the fierce nature of the honey badger and attempted to think like the animal in defence. He is also well known for starring in the sixth season of The Bachelor Australia.

== Early life ==
Cummins was born in Port Macquarie, New South Wales. One of eight siblings, he identifies as a Queenslander as he was raised in Logan City in Brisbane's south by his father Mark Cummins, who was a single dad. He attended St Francis' College in Crestmead, where he starred in the swimming pool and on the athletics track, as well as on the rugby field.

In 2005, Cummins represented Queensland at the Australian Schools Rugby Championships in Canberra. He moved to Sydney in 2006, where he joined the Randwick rugby club and played for their grand final-winning Colts side that year.

== Rugby career ==
In 2007, Cummins was selected for the Australian Sevens squad and he was the top try scorer for the team at the IRB Sevens World Series. Later that year, he moved to Perth after signing a two-year contract with the Western Force.

Cummins played for the Perth Spirit team that reached the semi-final stage of the Australian Rugby Championship in 2007. He made his Super Rugby debut for the Western Force in 2008, starting in the first round against the Sharks in Durban.

In 2009, Cummins was invited to the Wallabies training camp prior to the northern Spring Tour, although injury prevented his involvement on that tour.

In 2010, he was selected for the Australian Barbarians and played in two home matches against England. He was then selected in Australia's 28-man squad that travelled to South Africa as part of the 2010 Tri-Nations series, although he wasn't required to play. Later that year, Cummins went to the Commonwealth Games Sevens tournament in Delhi, where he played in Australia's silver medal-winning team.

In 2012, Cummins was selected for the Australia squad for the inaugural Rugby Championship. He made his Test debut on 6 October 2012, and played on the wing in the Wallabies 25–19 win over Argentina in Rosario.

On 4 July 2014 it was announced that Cummins would be released early from his Western Force and Australian Rugby Union contracts on compassionate grounds. He announced he would be moving to Japan due to health concerns in his family. He signed a new contract with Japanese club the Coca-Cola Red Sparks.

In 2016, Cummins won his first Championship outside of junior rugby when he came on as a non-scoring substitute in the final of the amateur Norwegian Rugby Union Championship for Stavanger RK in their win against Oslo RK.

== Television and advertising roles ==
Because of Cummins' broad Australian accent and very Australian attitude, he has featured in several ad campaigns as an "Aussie Larrikin" character. Cummins has been the face of Tradie underwear and workwear for men since August 2015, as well as featuring in small TV campaigns for Head & Shoulders shampoo in 2014 and beer company Iron Jack over Christmas in late 2017.

In October 2017, he was an ambassador for Tourism Australia, in a campaign which also featured Australian actor Lincoln Lewis. Cummins playfully took aim at Tourism Australia ambassador, Chris Hemsworth, defending claims he was not as big a name as the Hollywood-based Australian actor.

Cummins is also the presenter of the National Geographic program Meanwhile In Australia. A documentary series in which he travels around Australia gathering stories of people and places along the road.

On 14 March 2018, it was confirmed by Network Ten that Cummins would star in the sixth season of The Bachelor Australia in 2018.

Cummins appeared as one of the hosts for Team Australia on the third season of Ultimate Beastmaster, a Netflix original series.

In 2020, it was announced Cummins would be participating in the Seven Network's reality program SAS Australia. Cummins was one of three recruits to pass selection along with Merrick Watts and Sabrina Frederick.

2023 saw Cummins entering the South African jungle as a late arrival on the 9th season of I'm a Celebrity... Get Me Out of Here! Australia. Cummins was eliminated 4th on 20 April 2023.

== Super Rugby statistics ==
As of 14 July 2016

| Season | Team | Games | Starts | Sub | Mins | Tries | Cons | Pens | Drops | Points | Yel | Red |
|---|---|---|---|---|---|---|---|---|---|---|---|---|
| 2008 | Force | 9 | 6 | 3 | 520 | 0 | 0 | 0 | 0 | 0 | 0 | 0 |
| 2009 | Force | 6 | 6 | 0 | 417 | 2 | 0 | 0 | 0 | 10 | 0 | 0 |
| 2010 | Force | 9 | 8 | 1 | 594 | 2 | 0 | 0 | 0 | 10 | 0 | 0 |
| 2011 | Force | 15 | 14 | 1 | 1084 | 2 | 0 | 0 | 0 | 10 | 1 | 0 |
| 2012 | Force | 14 | 14 | 0 | 1074 | 3 | 0 | 0 | 0 | 15 | 0 | 0 |
| 2013 | Force | 6 | 6 | 0 | 480 | 0 | 0 | 0 | 0 | 0 | 0 | 0 |
| 2014 | Force | 15 | 15 | 0 | 1200 | 7 | 0 | 0 | 0 | 35 | 0 | 0 |
| 2015 | Force | 13 | 13 | 0 | 1020 | 1 | 0 | 0 | 0 | 5 | 0 | 0 |
| Total | | 87 | 82 | 5 | 6389 | 17 | 0 | 0 | 0 | 85 | 1 | 0 |

== Publications ==
- Cummins, Nick (1 December 2015). Tales of the Honey Badger. ABC Books. ISBN 978-0-73333-472-6.
- Cummins, Nick; Cummins, Mark (21 November 2016). Adventures of the Honey Badger. ABC Books. ISBN 978-0-73333-786-4.
- Cummins, Nick; Cummins, Mark (9 October 2018). The Honey Badger guide to life. Pan Macmillan Australia. ISBN 978-1-76055-807-9.
