= Sandy Heribert =

French-British TV journalist

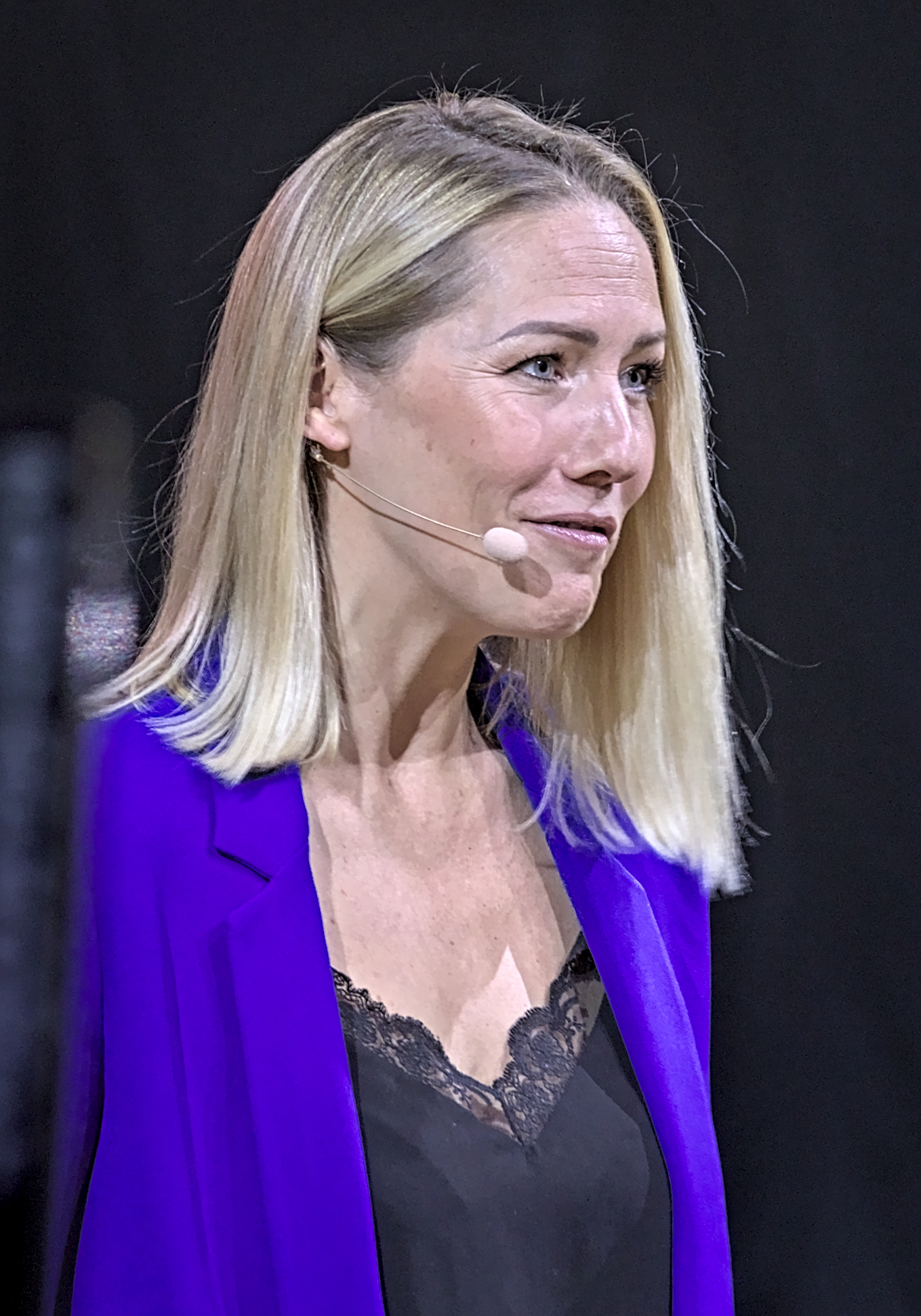
- Heribert in 2024
- Born: 25 November 1983 (age 42); Épinay-sur-Seine, France
- Education: Institut supérieur du commerce de Paris
- Occupations: Journalist, presenter
- Years active: 2010–present
- Employer(s): France 2, L'Équipe
- Website: www.sandyheribert.com

Sandy Héribert (born 25 November 1983) is a French-British TV journalist, show host and presenter who currently works for French media channel France 2 and L'Équipe. A graduate of Institut supérieur du commerce de Paris, she began her career at Eurosport before later moving on to work for several other media outlets, including CNews, My Sports Channel, RTL-TVI, Voyage and France 4.

She has hosted the Ballon d'Or ceremony, along with former Ivorian footballer Didier Drogba, since 2019.

== Early life and education ==
Heribert was born in Épinay-sur-Seine to a Breton-Franco-Belgian father and a British mother.

She attended the Lycée Notre-Dame de Bury. She holds a master's degree in marketing. She also holds a master's degree in media marketing from Institut supérieur du commerce de Paris and a master's degree in journalism from CELSA Paris.

== Career ==
Heribert began her career at Eurosport. She spent five years at the company, serving as a presenter for several programs and events, including coverage of the 2014 Winter Olympics in Sochi. In 2015, she began working as a freelancer. Within that period, she worked for multiple French media outlets while covering and interviewing during the 2016 Summer Olympics in Rio de Janeiro. Immediately after that, she earned a role to provide French commentary (alongside actor Gilles Marini) for the sports entertainment reality show competition Ultimate Beastmaster on Netflix during seasons 2 and 3, which were released on 15 December 2017 and 31 August 2018, respectively. When she began working as a freelancer, she worked for over a year at CNews, L'Équipe and My Sports Channel. Between 2016 and 2017, she moved to Belgium and worked as a presenter for De quoi je me mèle, a daily talk show on RTL-TVI broadcast live from Brussels.

In January 2017, Heribert was offered a show to host by the production company Bo Travail, serving as their main host and presenter of the discovery programme - Sur Les Alpes perchés. She hosted the show, a 16-episode series of 26 minutes each that sought to discover the most emblematic resorts of the Alps in Europe and was broadcast on the TV channel Voyage.

In January 2018, Heribert covered the 2018 Dakar Rally and later received an offer from L’ensemble media as their editor-in-chief for their new automotive magazine. From 2018 to 2019, she was the editor and presenter of the societal talk show Sans se braquer on Automoto La chaîne. In the early part of September 2019, Heribert succeeded Margot Laffite as the presenter of the V6 show on the same channel for two years.

In March 2019, Heribert was the green room host during Destination Eurovision for France 2 alongside main on-stage presenter Garou. She was also joined by André Manoukian as a commentator for the Eurovision Song Contest 2019 semi-finals on France 4 in Tel Aviv, Israel and also for the finals alongside Stéphane Bern and Manoukian on France 2. In November 2019, Heribert was also the commentator for the Junior Eurovision Song Contest 2019 along with Bern on France 2.

Since September 2019, she has been hosting La Course des champions (the Champions Race) on France 2 alongside Teddy Riner and Olivier Minne at the Stade de France. Heribert has covered several international sporting events, including the 2019 FIFA Women's World Cup, UEFA Euro 2016, the 2015 Rugby World Cup and the 2016 Six Nations Championship.

In December 2019, she co-hosted the 2019 Ballon d’Or ceremony alongside Ivorian former footballer Didier Drogba. In September 2019, she participated in the game show Fort Boyard broadcast on France 2. In September 2020, she hosted the red carpet and live backstage at the Monte Carlo Gala for planetary health, sponsored by the Albert II of Monaco Foundation. In November 2021, she co-hosted the 2021 Ballon d'Or again with Didier Drogba.

I was 9 years old. Martine Laroche-Joubert was covering the Gulf War and I said to my parents: “I want to be like the lady, go and tell people's stories. "

— Sandy Heribert on what inspired her to go into journalism.

In 2022 she worked as a stand-in presenter in selected rounds of the Eurosport coverage of the FIA World Touring Car Cup.

== Personal life ==
During the Gulf War, Heribert was nine years old. She was inspired by journalist Martine Laroche-Joubert who was covering the war and she declared that she wanted to be a field reporter and report such stories. Heribert speaks French and English fluently.

She gave birth to a daughter in May 2021 fathered by her partner, Charles Febraud.
