= Inés Sainz =

Mexican sports journalist and model

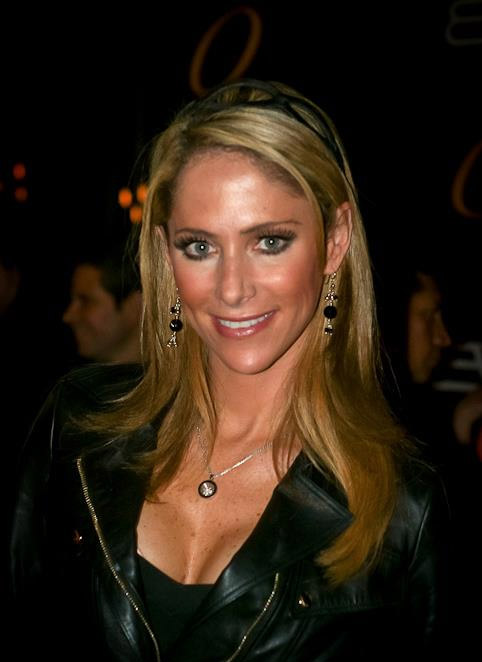
- Sainz in 2013
- Born: Inés Sainz Gallo; 20 September 1975 (age 51); Santiago de Querétaro, Mexico
- Education: Universidad del Valle de México; Universidad Autónoma de Querétaro
- Occupations: Sports journalist; television personality; reporter; model
- Years active: 2001–present
- Television: Deportips Y Mas; Los Protagonistas; De Safari
- Spouse: Héctor Pérez Rojano (m. 1998)
- Children: 4
- Modeling information
- Height: 1.70 m (5 ft 7 in)
- Hair color: Blonde
- Eye color: Green
- Website: inessainz.mx

Inés Sainz Gallo (Spanish pronunciation: [iˈnes ˈsajns]; born 20 September 1975) is a Mexican sports journalist, television personality, and model. She is currently signed to Azteca Deportes, where she is best known for anchoring the program DxTips (or, Deportips). She and her husband own the production company that created the program.

== Biography ==
Inés Sainz Gallo was born on 20 September 1978 in Santiago de Querétaro, Mexico. Her father was a lawyer and her mother was a homemaker. She grew up in Mexico City with her parents and three brothers, one of them being her twin. Although she was active in a number of sports, her mother wanted her to be more feminine, and encouraged her to pursue modeling. She entered the modeling industry through shooting commercials for companies like Bacardi, Hoteles Misión, and Telcel.

Sainz graduated with a law degree from the Universidad del Valle de México in Querétaro and earned a masters degree in tax law from the Universidad Autónoma de Querétaro. She also earned a graduate degree in sports business administration.

While moving from modeling to sports reporting, Sainz married Mexican television producer Héctor Pérez Rojano in 1998. Together, they have four children; María Inés, Eduardo, Hector, and Maya. She remains an active participant in sports such as football, swimming, volleyball, basketball and tennis.

== Career ==
=== Sports journalism ===
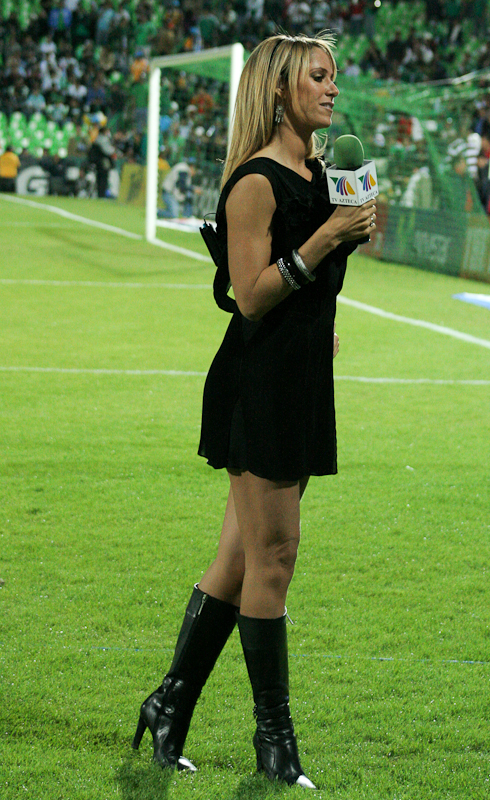
Inés Sainz at the Mexico vs. North Korea international friendly football match in Torreón, Coahuila, Mexico, on 17 March 2010.

Sainz has interviewed tennis players Roger Federer and Rafael Nadal, basketball players Kobe Bryant and Shaquille O'Neal, baseball players Derek Jeter and Alex Rodriguez and association football players Ronaldo, Roberto Carlos, Rivaldo, Zinedine Zidane, Cristiano Ronaldo and Lionel Messi among others. By July 2006, she covered three Champions League tournaments, four NBA Finals, the 2004 Athens Olympics and the 2006 World Cup. As of 2009, she has covered six Super Bowls, her first one being Super Bowl XXXVI in 2002.

In January 2009, promoting American football stars to a Mexican audience, Sainz ran an informal biceps competition during the Super Bowl XLIII "media day," awarding her "Strongest Right Arm" award to the Arizona Cardinals' defensive end Antonio Smith. According to the Palm Beach Post, at the 2007 Super Bowl's "media day," she was photographed as often as Peyton Manning; and according to The Daily Telegraph, she was "besides Manning, the single-most popular person on the premises." During a period when Terrell Owens was not speaking with the press in 2008, she was the only reporter who was able to gain an exclusive interview with the wide receiver.

Boxing promotion company Top Rank hired Sainz to conduct pre-event reports and interviews and offer ringside commentary for the Manny Pacquiao vs. Antonio Margarito bout in Arlington, Texas on 13 November 2010. On 12 March 2011, she was a broadcast commentator for the Miguel Cotto vs. Ricardo Mayorga bout.

Sainz became a co-host for the Netflix reality show Ultimate Beastmaster in 2016. She hosted seasons 1 and 3 for Mexico.

=== Public image ===
In 2010, TV Azteca's website's featured photo galleries of Sainz as well as an article in its "Bad Girls" section extolling her as a woman of intelligence and humor, illustrated by a photo of her modeling a swimsuit. Likewise, during the 2000s, Sainz appeared on the cover of numerous magazines such as Revista Gente y la Actualidad, H Para Hombres, Maxim, and Esquire Mexico.

Prior and during the 2010 World Cup, pictures of Sainz were featured on different platforms such as Bleacher Report and the websites run by Sports Illustrated and Men's Health. She was chosen by the magazine FHM as the fifth sexiest woman sports reporter in the world in August 2009.

=== Controversy ===
In 2010 the TV Azteca reporter sought an interview with then NY Jets quarterback Mark Sanchez, and she had been standing on the sidelines during practice when Jets players and coaches appeared to throw footballs in her direction. Later, as she waited in the locker room to conduct an interview with Sanchez, she was reportedly the target of lewd comments from players and staff. She tweeted in Spanish: "I'm so uncomfortable! I'm in the Jets locker room waiting for Mark Sanchez and trying not to look around me." And a few moments later, she wrote, "I want to cover my ears." Media persons reported that team members made "catcalls and rude comments". According to Sainz, it was "the rest of the media start to hear the different kind of things that I didn't hear." She accepted a personal apology from Jets owner Woody Johnson when those incidents became known to him.

In the immediate aftermath of the incident, Sainz lost a contract to be the spokesperson for a Mexican bank, which she said was "very painful" for her; however, she said that the publicity resulting from the event also led her to become "the most popular journalist right now in Mexico and Latin America."

== See also ==
- Inés Gómez Mont
- María Inés Guerra
- Association for Women in Sports Media
- Lisa Olson
- Jenn Sterger
- Katherine Webb
