= Ultimate Beastmaster =

American competition reality television show (2017–2018)

- Genre: Reality sports entertainment
- Created by: Dave Broome
- Theme music composer: Jon Ernst; Sean Holt
- Country of origin: United States
- Original languages: English; Portuguese; German; Japanese; Korean; Spanish; French; Italian; Chinese; Hindi
- No. of seasons: 3
- No. of episodes: 29

Production
- Executive producers: Dave Broome; Sylvester Stallone; Yong Yam; Kevin King-Templeton; Elayne Cilic; Travis McDaniel; Mike Espinosa
- Running time: 44–83 minutes
- Production company: 25/7 Productions

Original release
- Network: Netflix
- Release: February 24, 2017 – August 31, 2018

Related
- Sasuke

Ultimate Beastmaster is an American reality sports entertainment competition that premiered on Netflix on February 24, 2017. The show differentiates itself from other obstacle course competition shows by showcasing not only international talent, but by producing six localized versions, featuring select television hosts, actors, comedians and athletes as commentators from the six countries competing in the show. Reactions from all countries' hosts appear in each localized versions, especially during course clearing victories. Each season consists of 10 episodes, released simultaneously on Netflix worldwide. The first season premiered on February 24, 2017, while the second season aired on Netflix on December 15, 2017.

In February 2018, the show was renewed for a third season, consisting of nine episodes, which premiered on August 31, 2018.

== Premise ==
In each episode, there are twelve contestants (two from each country) who run a new obstacle course known as “The Beast”. The winner is crowned “Beastmaster”. Each of the "Beastmasters" from the nine Beastmaster episodes will go forward to a final course, to become the Ultimate Beastmaster. Starting in Season 3, each show featured nine competitors (one from each country in the competition). The two competitors with the highest score in the final stage moved onto one of two semi-finals. The top three from each semi-final moved to the final episode to be crowned Ultimate Beastmaster.

== Seasons ==
=== Season 1 ===
Season 1 premiered on Netflix on February 24, 2017. The season was filmed in Santa Clarita, California, over the course of eight nights. Felipe Camargo of Brazil was the Ultimate Beastmaster winner for placing first. He was also the only person to fully complete Level 4 of the Beast in Season 1.

=== Season 2 ===
Prior to the release of season 1, Netflix had already ordered and shot season 2. The second season premiered on Netflix on December 15, 2017, with contestants from the United States, Spain, France, Italy, China and India. Haibin Qu of China was crowned the Ultimate Beastmaster for placing first and completing the entire course in the final.

=== Season 3 ===
In February 2018 the show was renewed for a third season, consisting of nine episodes. The third season features the United States, Brazil, Germany, Mexico, South Korea, France, Italy, United Kingdom and Australia. Season 3 was released on August 31, 2018. Season 3 featured a tournament-style bracket, in which two athletes advanced from each episode to a semifinal round, then to a final round where they fought for the title of Ultimate Beastmaster. Corbin Mackin from the United Kingdom was crowned Beastmaster for placing first.

== Reception ==
James Hibberd compares the first season of Ultimate Beastmaster related to American Ninja Warrior in a mixed review of the shows. Hibberd praises Ultimate Beastmaster's "gorgeous superstructure" of a course, the international rivalry aspect and concise contestant profile clips, but criticizes the show's commentators and the repetitiveness of the course, the latter of which American Ninja Warrior avoids.
