= Club of the Year (France Football) =

Annual association football award presented by France Football

- Awarded for: Best men's and women's football clubs of the season
- Country: France
- Presented by: France Football
- First award: 2021
- Currently held by: (France) Paris Saint-Germain (men) (Spain) Barcelona (women)

Highlights
- Most awards: Men: (France) Paris Saint-Germain (England) Manchester City (2 each); Women: (Spain) Barcelona (3)

The Club of the Year is an annual association football award presented by France Football. It honours the best men's and women's football clubs of the previous season.

== History ==
France Football first awarded the Men's Club of the Year in 2021, with Chelsea as the inaugural winner. Manchester City won the award in 2022 and 2023, followed by Real Madrid in 2024, and Paris Saint-Germain in 2025 and 2026.

The Women's Club of the Year was first awarded in 2023, with FC Barcelona Femení winning the 2023, 2024 and 2026 editions, and Arsenal W.F.C. won in 2025.

== Winners (men's) ==
Year	Club	Country
2021	(England) Chelsea	England
2022	(England) Manchester City	England
2023	(England) Manchester City	England
2024	(Spain) Real Madrid	Spain
2025	(France) Paris Saint-Germain	France
2026	(France) Paris Saint-Germain	France

=== Statistics ===
==== By club ====
Club	Titles
(England) Manchester City	2
(France) Paris Saint-Germain	2
(England) Chelsea	1
(Spain) Real Madrid	1

==== By country ====
Country	Titles
England	3
France	2
Spain	1

== Winners (women's) ==
Year	Club	Country
2023	(Spain) Barcelona	Spain
2024	(Spain) Barcelona	Spain
2025	(England) Arsenal	England
2026	(Spain) Barcelona	Spain

=== Statistics ===
==== By club ====
Club	Titles
(Spain) Barcelona	3
(England) Asrenal	1

==== By country ====
Country	Titles
Spain	3
England	1

== See also ==
- Ballon d'Or
