= Sócrates Award =

Annual association football award

- Prix Socrate
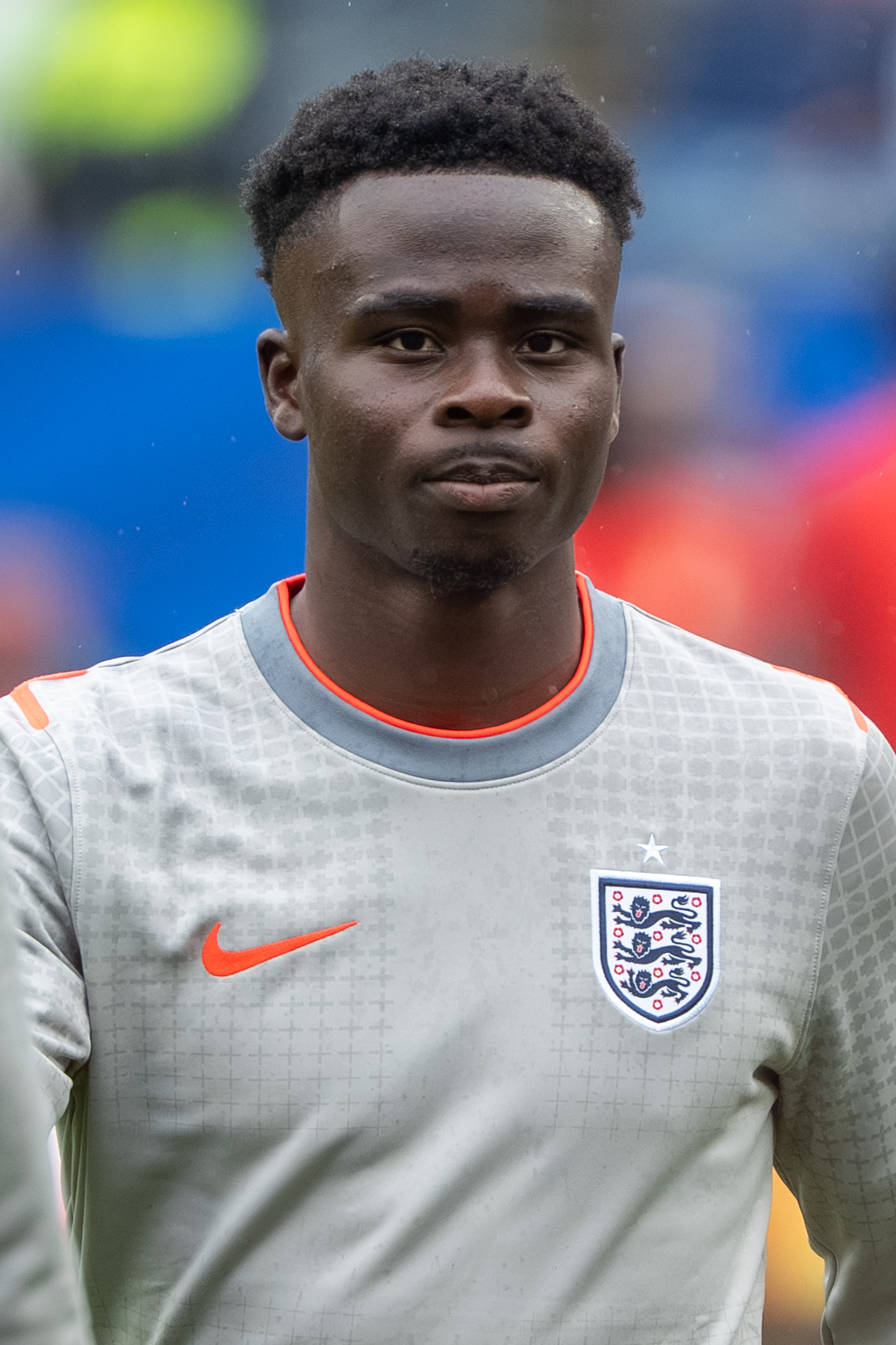
- Bukayo Saka is the current award holder
- Date: 17 October 2022; 4 years ago
- Location: Paris
- Country: France
- Presented by: France Football
- First award: 2022
- Current holder: (England) Bukayo Saka (1st award)
- Website: peace-sport.org/socrates-award/
- Related: Ballon d'Or

The Sócrates Award is an association football award presented to the best humanitarian work by a footballer worldwide during a joint ceremony with the Ballon d'Or. The award is presented by France Football in collaboration with Peace and Sport and is named after late Brazilian footballer Sócrates, who co-founded the Corinthians Democracy movement, in opposition to the ruling military dictatorship in Brazil during the 1980s. Sadio Mané was the first winner of the award in 2022, while Bukayo Saka is the current winner, having received the prize in 2026.

== Winners ==
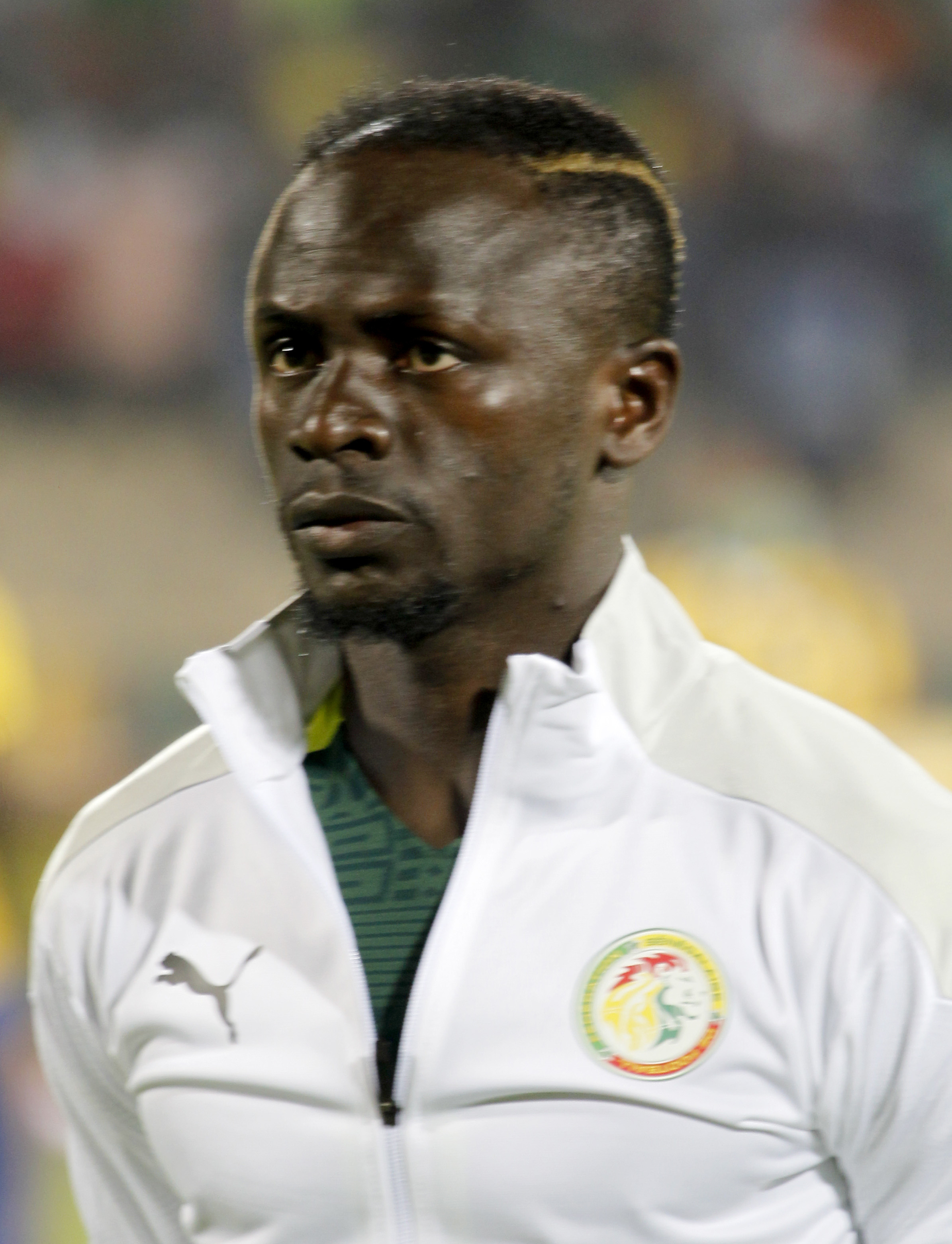
Sadio Mané, the inaugural winner.

Year	Player / Coach	Club	Awarded for
2022	(Senegal) Sadio Mané	(England) Liverpool	His extensive charitable contributions in Senegal, including funding a hospital and school in Bambali, his hometown, and supporting numerous social projects to improve healthcare and education.
2023	(Brazil) Vinícius Júnior	(Spain) Real Madrid	His efforts against racism and promoting educational initiatives in Brazil, notably through his Instituto Vini Jr., which aims to reduce the digital divide in public schools and provide innovative pedagogical solutions.
2024	(Spain) Jennifer Hermoso	(Mexico) UANL	Her work against sexual abuse, specifically her work bringing awareness to others after then-Spanish Federation President Luis Rubiales kissed her on the lips without her consent.
2025	(Spain) Xana Foundation (Luis Enrique)	(France) Paris Saint-Germain	For his commitment to supporting seriously ill children and their families by providing medical, financial and psychological support.
2026	(England) Bukayo Saka	(England) Arsenal	For his efforts of Big Shoe providing care to children who are in desperate need.

=== Wins by nation ===
Country	Players / Coaches	Wins
Spain	2	2
Brazil	1	1
England	1	1
Senegal	1	1

=== Wins by club ===
Club	Players / Coaches	Win
(England) Arsenal	1	1
(England) Liverpool	1	1
(France) Paris Saint-Germain	1	1
(Spain) Real Madrid	1	1
(Mexico) UANL	1	1
