= 2019 Ballon d'Or =

Annual association football award event in France

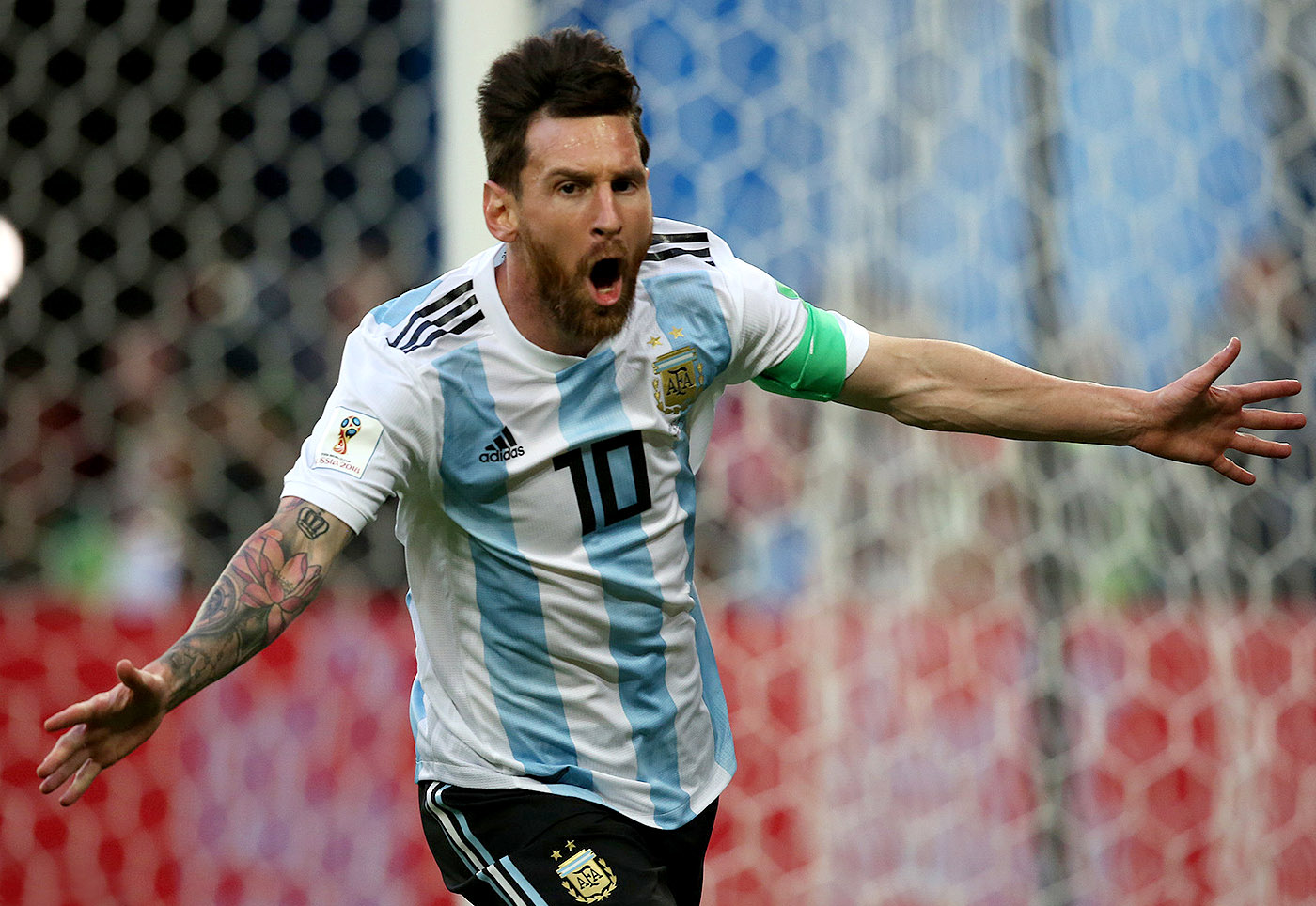
- 2019 Ballon d'Or winner, Lionel Messi
- Date: 2 December 2019
- Location: Théâtre du Châtelet, Paris
- Country: France
- Presented by: France Football
- Hosted by: Sandy Heribert; Didier Drogba

Highlights
- Ballon d'Or: (Argentina) Lionel Messi (6th award)
- Ballon d'Or Féminin: (United States) Megan Rapinoe (1st award)
- Kopa Trophy: (Netherlands) Matthijs de Ligt (1st award)
- Yashin Trophy: (Brazil) Alisson (1st award)
- Website: ballondor.com

The 2019 Ballon d'Or (lit. '2019 Golden Ball'), was the 64th annual ceremony of the Ballon d'Or, presented by France Football, and recognising the best footballers in the world for 2019. Barcelona superstar Lionel Messi won his record-breaking sixth award and broke the tie with Cristiano Ronaldo for most Ballon d'Or awards. Virgil van Dijk came in a very close second after a stellar year with Liverpool and Netherlands national team while Cristiano Ronaldo came in third with Juventus.

== Ballon d'Or ==
The nominees for the awards were announced on 21 October 2019.

Rank	Player	Club(s)	Points
1	(Argentina) Lionel Messi	(Spain) Barcelona	686
2	(Netherlands) Virgil van Dijk	(England) Liverpool	679
3	(Portugal) Cristiano Ronaldo	(Italy) Juventus	476
4	(Senegal) Sadio Mané	(England) Liverpool	347
5	(Egypt) Mohamed Salah	(England) Liverpool	178
6	(France) Kylian Mbappé	(France) Paris Saint-Germain	89
7	(Brazil) Alisson	(England) Liverpool	67
8	(Poland) Robert Lewandowski	(Germany) Bayern Munich	44
9	(Portugal) Bernardo Silva	(England) Manchester City	41
10	(Algeria) Riyad Mahrez	(England) Manchester City	33
11	(Netherlands) Frenkie de Jong	(Netherlands) Ajax (Spain) Barcelona	31
12	(England) Raheem Sterling	(England) Manchester City	30
13	(Belgium) Eden Hazard	(England) Chelsea (Spain) Real Madrid	25
14	(Belgium) Kevin De Bruyne	(England) Manchester City	14
15	(Netherlands) Matthijs de Ligt	(Netherlands) Ajax (Italy) Juventus	13
16	(Argentina) Sergio Agüero	(England) Manchester City	12
17	(Brazil) Roberto Firmino	(England) Liverpool	11
18	(France) Antoine Griezmann	(Spain) Atlético Madrid (Spain) Barcelona	9
19	(England) Trent Alexander-Arnold	(England) Liverpool	8
20	(Gabon) Pierre-Emerick Aubameyang	(England) Arsenal	5
20	(Serbia) Dušan Tadić	(Netherlands) Ajax	5
22	(South Korea) Son Heung-min	(England) Tottenham Hotspur	4
23	(France) Hugo Lloris	(England) Tottenham Hotspur	3
24	(Senegal) Kalidou Koulibaly	(Italy) Napoli	2
24	(Germany) Marc-André ter Stegen	(Spain) Barcelona	2
26	(France) Karim Benzema	(Spain) Real Madrid	1
26	(Netherlands) Georginio Wijnaldum	(England) Liverpool	1
28	(Portugal) João Félix	(Portugal) Benfica (Spain) Atlético Madrid	0
28	(Brazil) Marquinhos	(France) Paris Saint-Germain	0
28	(Netherlands) Donny van de Beek	(Netherlands) Ajax	0

=== Controversy ===
The edition of the award was controversial in that while many believed that Messi was the rightful winner of the award, many others believed that Virgil van Dijk had been unfairly overlooked. Jürgen Klopp stated afterwards: "Last season, if you really go for only that season, then I cannot remember a more impressive season for a defender ever, honestly. So it would have been right as well if Virgil would have won it." Steven Gerrard concurred, stating: "I'm Messi's number one fan, for sure. I love the player. Obscene numbers in his game in terms of assists and goals. I'm definitely a Messi fan, in the gang. ... But if you talk about consistency from one player over a year, who wins the European Cup and is absolutely faultless in every performance, that means you deserve to win the Ballon d'Or."

== Ballon d'Or Féminin ==
Megan Rapinoe won the 2019 Ballon d'Or Féminin for best female player in the world.

Rank	Player	Club(s)	Points
1	(United States) Megan Rapinoe	(United States) Reign FC	230
2	(England) Lucy Bronze	(France) Lyon	94
3	(United States) Alex Morgan	(United States) Orlando Pride	68
4	(Norway) Ada Hegerberg	(France) Lyon	67
5	(Netherlands) Vivianne Miedema	(England) Arsenal	38
6	(France) Wendie Renard	(France) Lyon	32
7	(Australia) Sam Kerr	(United States) Chicago Red Stars (England) Chelsea	27
8	(United States) Rose Lavelle	(United States) Washington Spirit	19
9	(England) Ellen White	(England) Manchester City	18
10	(Germany) Dzsenifer Marozsán	(France) Lyon	16
11	(France) Amandine Henry	(France) Lyon	13
12	(Netherlands) Sari van Veenendaal	(Spain) Atlético Madrid	13
13	(United States) Tobin Heath	(United States) Portland Thorns	11
14	(Denmark) Pernille Harder	(Germany) VfL Wolfsburg	10
14	(Netherlands) Lieke Martens	(Spain) Barcelona	10
16	(Sweden) Kosovare Asllani	(Spain) Tacón	6
16	(Sweden) Nilla Fischer	(Sweden) Linköping	6
16	(Brazil) Marta	(United States) Orlando Pride	6
19	(Sweden) Sofia Jakobsson	(Spain) Tacón	4
20	(France) Sarah Bouhaddi	(France) Lyon	0

== Kopa Trophy ==
Matthijs de Ligt won the 2019 Kopa Trophy for the best player in the world under the age of 21.

Rank	Player	Club(s)	Points
1	(Netherlands) Matthijs de Ligt	(Netherlands) Ajax (Italy) Juventus	58
2	(England) Jadon Sancho	(Germany) Borussia Dortmund	49
3	(Portugal) João Félix	(Portugal) Benfica (Spain) Atlético Madrid	41
4	(Brazil) Vinícius Júnior	(Spain) Real Madrid	17
5	(Ukraine) Andriy Lunin	(Spain) Leganés (Spain) Valladolid	9
6	(France) Matteo Guendouzi	(England) Arsenal	5
6	(Germany) Kai Havertz	(Germany) Bayer Leverkusen	5
8	(Italy) Moise Kean	(Italy) Juventus (England) Everton	3
9	(Nigeria) Samuel Chukwueze	(Spain) Villarreal	1
9	(South Korea) Lee Kang-in	(Spain) Valencia	1

== Yashin Trophy ==
Alisson won the inaugural Yashin Trophy as the best goalkeeper in the world in 2019.

Rank	Player	Club(s)	Points
1	(Brazil) Alisson	(England) Liverpool	795
2	(Germany) Marc-André ter Stegen	(Spain) Barcelona	284
3	(Brazil) Ederson	(England) Manchester City	142
4	(Slovenia) Jan Oblak	(Spain) Atlético Madrid	131
5	(France) Hugo Lloris	(England) Tottenham Hotspur	80
6	(Germany) Manuel Neuer	(Germany) Bayern Munich	52
7	(Cameroon) André Onana	(Netherlands) Ajax	41
8	(Spain) Kepa Arrizabalaga	(England) Chelsea	29
9	(Poland) Wojciech Szczęsny	(Italy) Juventus	24
10	(Slovenia) Samir Handanović	(Italy) Internazionale	6
