= 2022 Ballon d'Or =

Annual football award event in France

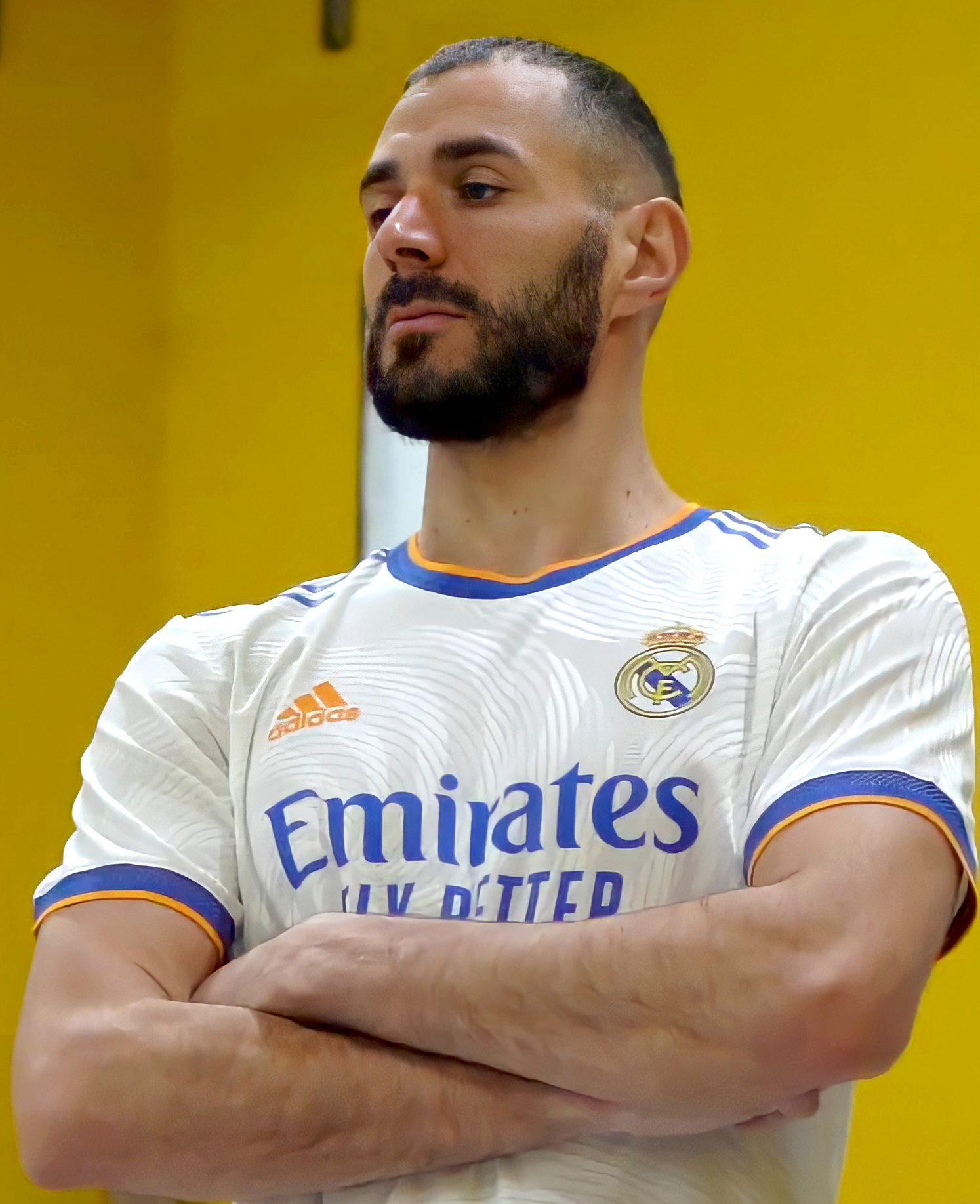
- 2022 Ballon d'Or winner Karim Benzema
- Date: 17 October 2022
- Location: Théâtre du Châtelet, Paris
- Presented by: France Football
- Hosted by: Sandy Heribert; Didier Drogba

Highlights
- Ballon d'Or: (France) Karim Benzema (1st award)
- Ballon d'Or Féminin: (Spain) Alexia Putellas (2nd award)
- Kopa Trophy: (Spain) Gavi (1st award)
- Yashin Trophy: (Belgium) Thibaut Courtois (1st award)
- Sócrates Award: (Senegal) Sadio Mané (1st award)
- Website: ballondor.com

The 2022 Ballon d'Or (lit. '2022 Golden Ball') was the 66th annual presentation of the Ballon d'Or, presented by France Football, recognising the best footballers in the world during the 2021–22 season. For the first time in the history of the award, it was given based on the results of the European season, instead of the calendar year. The nominees for the ceremony were announced on 12 August 2022, and the ceremony was held on 17 October.

Karim Benzema won the Ballon d'Or, for successfully leading Real Madrid to win both UEFA Champions League and La Liga. Alexia Putellas claimed the Ballon d'Or Féminin, following her successful domestic campaign with Barcelona. In the other award categories, Gavi was given the Kopa Trophy, Thibaut Courtois won the Yashin Trophy, Robert Lewandowski was presented the newly named Gerd Müller Trophy, Sadio Mané was awarded the inaugural Sócrates Award, and Manchester City claimed the Club of the Year award. Reigning winner Lionel Messi was not nominated for the award for the first time since 2005.

== Ballon d'Or ==
Following a successful season with Real Madrid, Karim Benzema was awarded the 2022 Ballon d'Or, finishing ahead of Sadio Mané in second place and Kevin De Bruyne in third. With his club, Benzema won the UEFA Champions League and the La Liga title. He was instrumental in the Spanish side's progress through the knockout phase of the Champions League, scoring crucial goals against Manchester City in the semi-final legs, as well as netting hat-tricks against Paris Saint-Germain and Chelsea in the round of 16 and quarter-finals respectively. He was selected in the tournament's team of the season as the top scorer and Player of the Season. In the domestic league, Benzema won the Pichichi Trophy as the top scorer, earning a place in the La Liga Team of the Season. With France, he helped win the country's first UEFA Nations League, scoring in the final with a 'Player of the match' performance. Among other awards, Benzema won the 2021 French Player of the Year, La Liga Player of the Season, Real Madrid Player of the Season, the Onze d'Or, and was selected in the IFFHS, European Sports Media, and L'Équipe teams of the season.

For players who appeared for multiple clubs during the season, only the most recent club is listed:

2022 Ballon d'Or ranking
| Rank | Player | Nationality | Position | Club | Points |
|---|---|---|---|---|---|
| 1 | Karim Benzema | France | Forward | (Spain) Real Madrid | 549 |
| 2 | Sadio Mané | Senegal | Forward | (England) Liverpool | 193 |
| 3 | Kevin De Bruyne | Belgium | Midfielder | (England) Manchester City | 175 |
| 4 | Robert Lewandowski | Poland | Forward | (Germany) Bayern Munich | 170 |
| 5 | Mohamed Salah | Egypt | Forward | (England) Liverpool | 116 |
| 6 | Kylian Mbappé | France | Forward | (France) Paris Saint-Germain | 85 |
| 7 | Thibaut Courtois | Belgium | Goalkeeper | (Spain) Real Madrid | 82 |
| 8 | Vinícius Júnior | Brazil | Forward | (Spain) Real Madrid | 61 |
| 9 | Luka Modrić | Croatia | Midfielder | (Spain) Real Madrid | 20 |
| 10 | Erling Haaland | Norway | Forward | (Germany) Borussia Dortmund | 18 |
| 11 | Son Heung-min | South Korea | Forward | (England) Tottenham Hotspur | 5 |
| 12 | Riyad Mahrez | Algeria | Midfielder | (England) Manchester City | 4 |
| 13 | Sébastien Haller | Ivory Coast | Forward | (Netherlands) Ajax | 2 |
| 14 | Fabinho | Brazil | Midfielder | (England) Liverpool | 2 |
| 14 | Rafael Leão | Portugal | Forward | (Italy) AC Milan | 2 |
| 16 | Virgil van Dijk | Netherlands | Defender | (England) Liverpool | 1 |
| 17 | Casemiro | Brazil | Midfielder | (Spain) Real Madrid | 1 |
| 17 | Luis Díaz | Colombia | Midfielder | (England) Liverpool (Note: Díaz was signed by Liverpool from Porto during the season.) | 1 |
| 17 | Dušan Vlahović | Serbia | Forward | (Italy) Juventus (Note: Vlahović was signed by Juventus from Fiorentina during the season.) | 1 |
| 20 | Cristiano Ronaldo | Portugal | Forward | (England) Manchester United (Note: Ronaldo was signed by Manchester United from Juventus during the season.) | 0 |
| 20 | Harry Kane | England | Forward | (England) Tottenham Hotspur | 0 |
| 20 | Trent Alexander-Arnold | England | Defender | (England) Liverpool | 0 |
| 20 | Phil Foden | England | Midfielder | (England) Manchester City | 0 |
| 20 | Bernardo Silva | Portugal | Midfielder | (England) Manchester City | 0 |
| 20 | João Cancelo | Portugal | Defender | (England) Manchester City | 0 |
| 20 | Joshua Kimmich | Germany | Midfielder | (Germany) Bayern Munich | 0 |
| 20 | Mike Maignan | France | Goalkeeper | (Italy) AC Milan | 0 |
| 20 | Christopher Nkunku | France | Forward | (Germany) RB Leipzig | 0 |
| 20 | Darwin Núñez | Uruguay | Forward | (Portugal) Benfica | 0 |
| 20 | Antonio Rüdiger | Germany | Defender | (England) Chelsea | 0 |

== Ballon d'Or Féminin ==
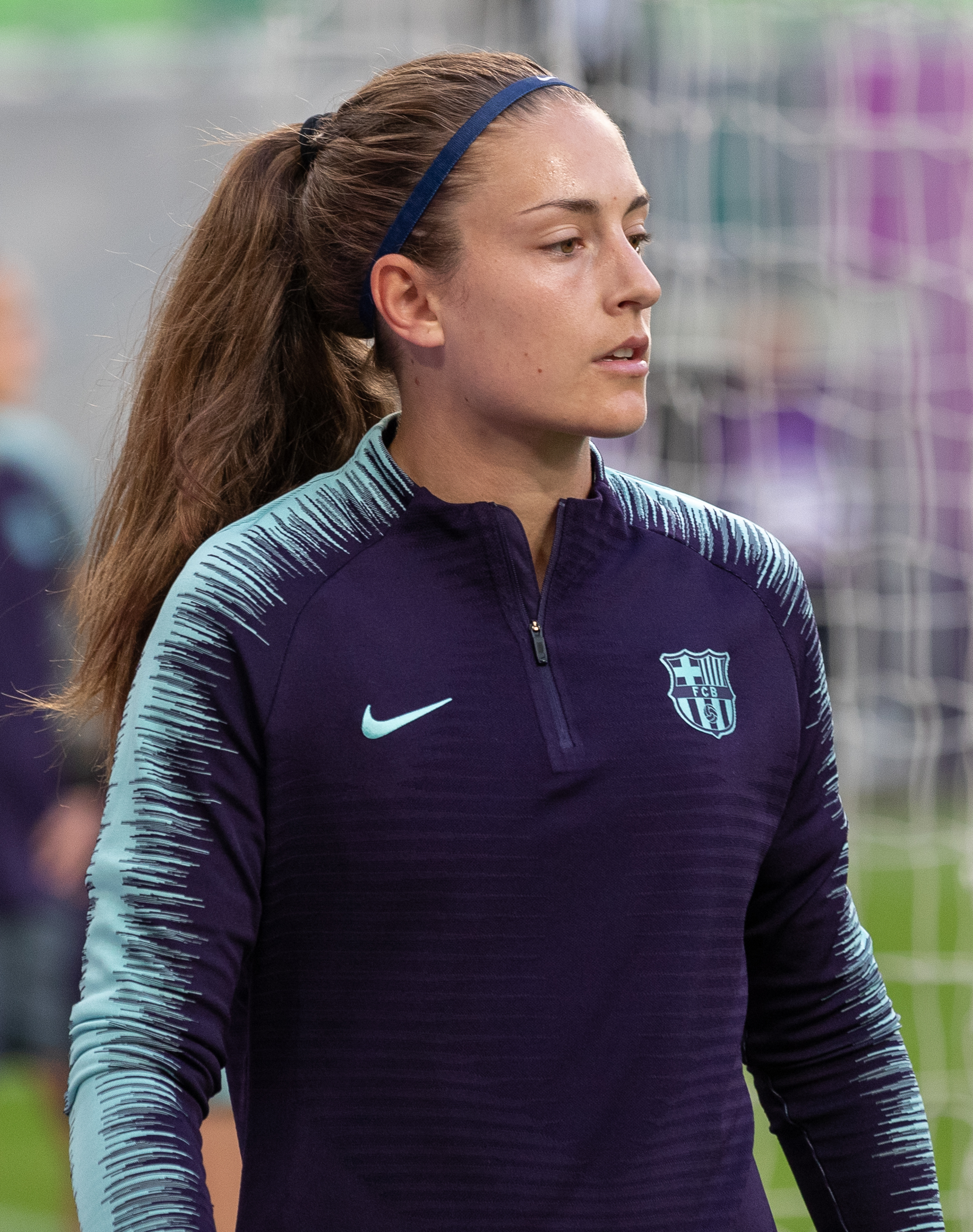
Alexia Putellas (pictured in 2019) won her second Ballon d'Or, following her 2021 trophy.

Alexia Putellas won the 2022 Ballon d'Or Féminin finishing ahead of European champion Beth Mead and Australian international Sam Kerr. She had a successful season with Barcelona, scoring in the UEFA Women's Champions League final, and winning the Primera División, Copa de la Reina and Supercopa de España. Putellas scored 34 goals within 42 appearances in all competitions, and she was awarded UWCL Player of the Season and included in the 2021–22 UWCL Team of the Season; she was also later awarded The Best FIFA Women's Player of the year, the UEFA Women's Player of the Year Award, and the IFFHS Women's Player and Playmaker of the Year.

For players who appeared for multiple clubs during the season, only the most recent club is listed:

2022 Ballon d'Or Féminin ranking
| Rank | Player | Nationality | Position | Club | Points |
|---|---|---|---|---|---|
| 1 | Alexia Putellas | Spain | Midfielder | (Spain) Barcelona | 178 |
| 2 | Beth Mead | England | Forward | (England) Arsenal | 152 |
| 3 | Sam Kerr | Australia | Forward | (England) Chelsea | 74 |
| 4 | Lena Oberdorf | Germany | Midfielder | (Germany) VfL Wolfsburg | 44 |
| 5 | Aitana Bonmatí | Spain | Midfielder | (Spain) Barcelona | 43 |
| 6 | Alexandra Popp | Germany | Forward | (Germany) VfL Wolfsburg | 37 |
| 7 | Ada Hegerberg | Norway | Forward | (France) Lyon | 29 |
| 8 | Wendie Renard | France | Defender | (France) Lyon | 26 |
| 9 | Catarina Macario | United States | Midfielder | (France) Lyon | 21 |
| 10 | Lucy Bronze | England | Defender | (England) Manchester City | 20 |
| 11 | Vivianne Miedema | Netherlands | Forward | (England) Arsenal | 14 |
| 12 | Christiane Endler | Chile | Goalkeeper | (France) Lyon | 10 |
| 13 | Alex Morgan | United States | Forward | (United States) San Diego Wave (Note: Morgan was signed by San Diego Wave from Orlando Pride during the season.) | 10 |
| 14 | Selma Bacha | France | Defender | (France) Lyon | 9 |
| 15 | Millie Bright | England | Defender | (England) Chelsea | 6 |
| 16 | Asisat Oshoala | Nigeria | Forward | (Spain) Barcelona | 4 |
| 17 | Marie-Antoinette Katoto | France | Forward | (France) Paris Saint-Germain | 4 |
| 18 | Trinity Rodman | United States | Forward | (United States) Washington Spirit | 3 |
| 19 | Fridolina Rolfö | Sweden | Forward | (Spain) Barcelona | 3 |
| 20 | Kadidiatou Diani | France | Forward | (France) Paris Saint-Germain | 1 |

== Kopa Trophy ==
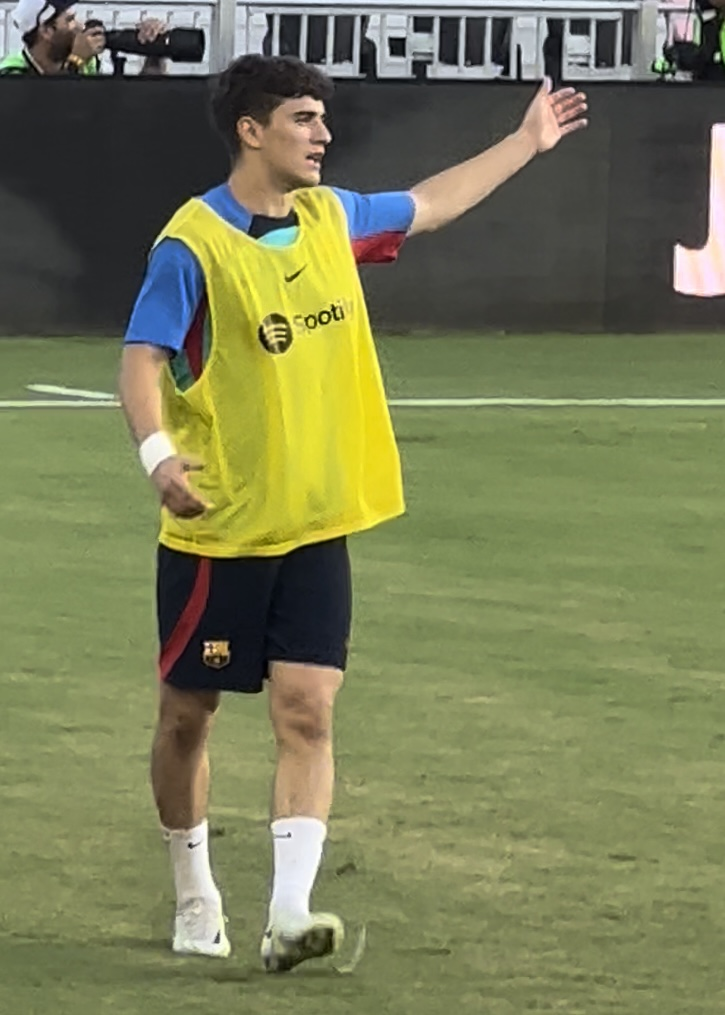
Aged 18 at the time, Gavi (pictured in 2022) won the Kopa Trophy, succeeding his Barcelona teammate Pedri, who won the 2021 award.

Gavi won the 2022 Kopa Trophy, awarded to the best performing footballer under the age of 21 during the season; he finished ahead of the likes of Eduardo Camavinga and Jamal Musiala, who had successful club seasons with Real Madrid and Bayern Munich respectively. Starting his season as a relatively unknown Spanish academy product, Gavi was handed his Barcelona debut aged 17 against Getafe in August 2021, making him the fourth youngest player to play in La Liga for Barcelona. After he established himself as a regular in Ronald Koeman's side, Spain national team manager Luis Enrique gave him a senior debut against Italy in the UEFA Nations League semi-final on 6 October 2021, making him the youngest player to represent the national team. Despite not winning any trophies at club or international level, Gavi personally had a successful club season with Barcelona, scoring two goals in 47 appearances in all competitions, playing regularly as a midfielder.

For players who appeared for multiple clubs during the season, only the most recent club is listed:

2022 Kopa Trophy ranking
| Rank | Player | Nationality | Position | Club | Points |
|---|---|---|---|---|---|
| 1 | Gavi | Spain | Midfielder | (Spain) Barcelona | 59 |
| 2 | Eduardo Camavinga | France | Midfielder | (Spain) Real Madrid (Note: Camavinga was signed by Real Madrid from Rennes during the season.) | 51 |
| 3 | Jamal Musiala | Germany | Midfielder | (Germany) Bayern Munich | 47 |
| 4 | Jude Bellingham | England | Midfielder | (Germany) Borussia Dortmund | 31 |
| 5 | Nuno Mendes | Portugal | Defender | (France) Paris Saint-Germain (Note: Mendes was signed by Paris Saint-Germain on loan from Sporting CP during the season.) | 9 |
| 6 | Ryan Gravenberch | Netherlands | Midfielder | (Netherlands) Ajax | 3 |
| 6 | Joško Gvardiol | Croatia | Defender | (Germany) RB Leipzig | 3 |
| 8 | Bukayo Saka | England | Midfielder | (England) Arsenal | 3 |
| 9 | Karim Adeyemi | Germany | Forward | (Germany) Borussia Dortmund (Note: Adeyemi was signed by Borussia Dortmund from Red Bull Salzburg during the season.) | 1 |
| 10 | Florian Wirtz | Germany | Midfielder | (Germany) Bayer Leverkusen | 0 |

== Yashin Trophy ==
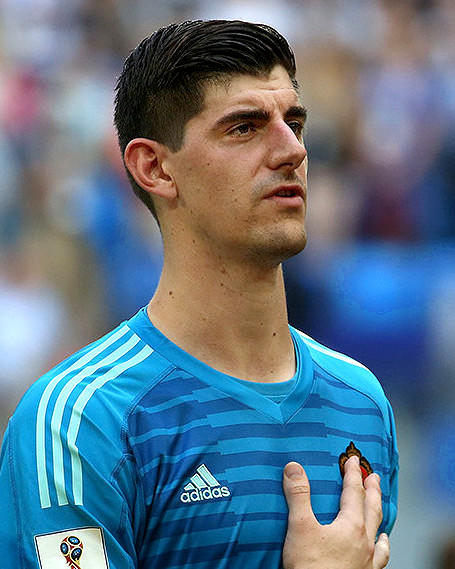
Thibaut Courtois (pictured in 2018) won the Yashin Trophy, finishing ahead of the likes of Premier League goalkeepers Alisson, Ederson and Édouard Mendy.

Belgian international Thibaut Courtois won the 2022 Yashin Trophy, awarded to the best performing goalkeeper during the 2021–22 season. During a very successful campaign with Real Madrid, he won both the UEFA Champions League and La Liga as a regular in the team, establishing himself as a prominent contender for the award. Aged 30 at the time of receiving the award, Courtois made the most saves of any goalkeeper featuring in the 2021–22 UEFA Champions League; during the competition's final against Liverpool, he made nine saves and was named man of the match. Courtois won the award ahead of Alisson and Ederson, who both shared the 2021–22 Premier League Golden Glove. The 2021 award winner, Gianluigi Donnarumma, was not nominated for the award.

2022 Yashin Trophy ranking
| Rank | Player | Nationality | Club | Points |
|---|---|---|---|---|
| 1 | Thibaut Courtois | Belgium | (Spain) Real Madrid | 456 |
| 2 | Alisson | Brazil | (England) Liverpool | 108 |
| 3 | Ederson | Brazil | (England) Manchester City | 72 |
| 4 | Édouard Mendy | Senegal | (England) Chelsea | 61 |
| 5 | Mike Maignan | France | (Italy) AC Milan | 45 |
| 6 | Kevin Trapp | Germany | (Germany) Eintracht Frankfurt | 27 |
| 7 | Manuel Neuer | Germany | (Germany) Bayern Munich | 25 |
| 8 | Jan Oblak | Slovenia | (Spain) Atlético Madrid | 17 |
| 9 | Yassine Bounou | Morocco | (Spain) Sevilla | 17 |
| 10 | Hugo Lloris | France | (England) Tottenham Hotspur | 9 |

== Gerd Müller Trophy ==
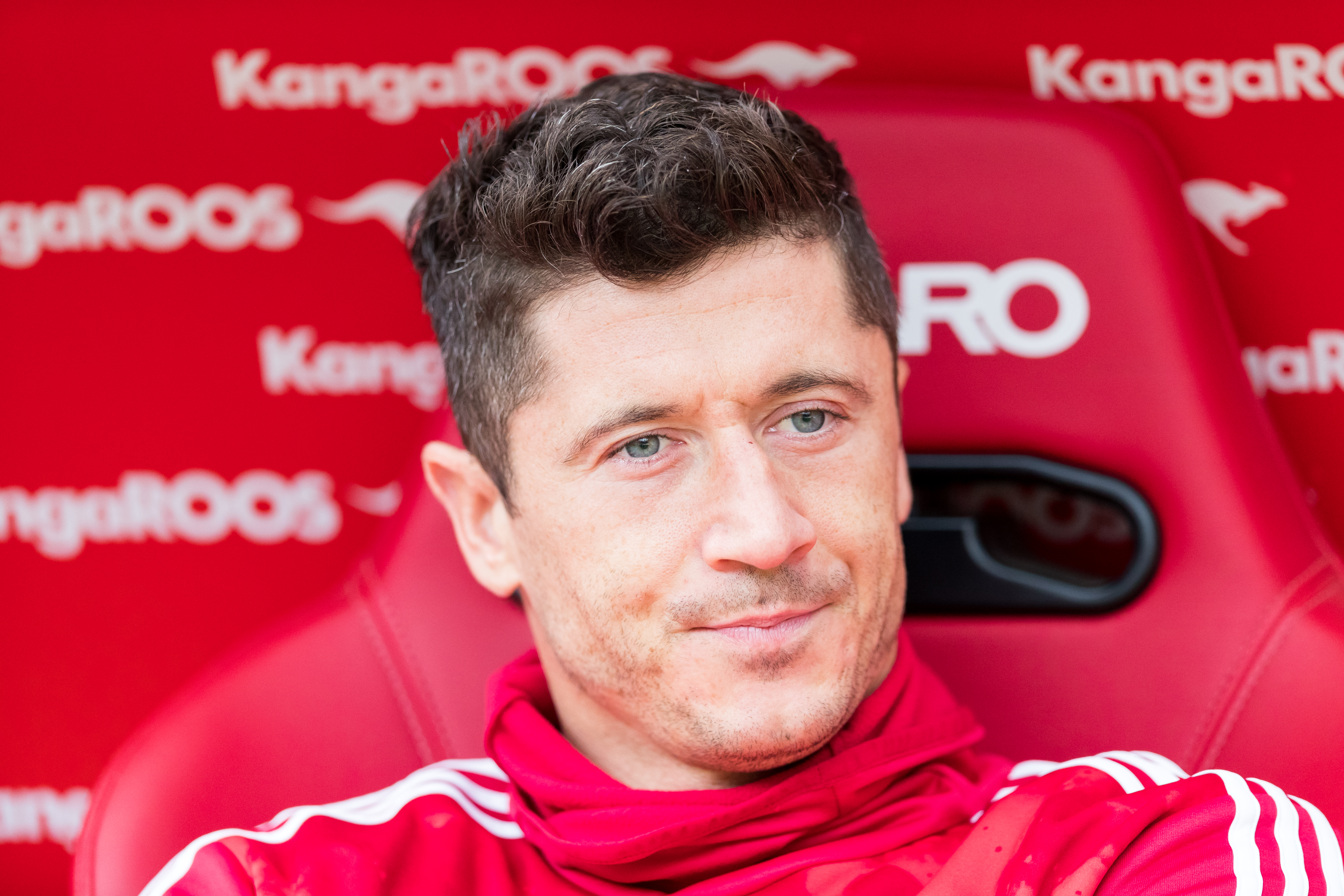
Robert Lewandowski (pictured in 2019) won the newly named Gerd Müller Trophy.

Polish striker Robert Lewandowski won the 2022 Gerd Müller Trophy, awarded to the highest-scoring striker of the 2021–22 season. After previously being known as the Striker of the Year award it was renamed as the Gerd Müller Trophy after German striker Gerd Müller died in August 2021. Lewandowski scored 57 goals in 56 matches, seven more than second placed Kylian Mbappé; he also finished fourth in the 2022 Ballon d'Or ranking, behind only Karim Benzema, Sadio Mané and Kevin De Bruyne. During his prolific season with Bayern Munich, Lewandowski lifted the Bundesliga title, as well as earning other personal honours such as the European Golden Shoe and the Golden Foot. This was Lewandowski's second time winning the award, after he won the inaugural edition in 2021.

2022 Gerd Müller Trophy winner
| Rank | Player | Nationality | Position | Club | Goals |
|---|---|---|---|---|---|
| 1 | Robert Lewandowski | Poland | Forward | (Germany) Bayern Munich | 57 |

== Sócrates Award ==
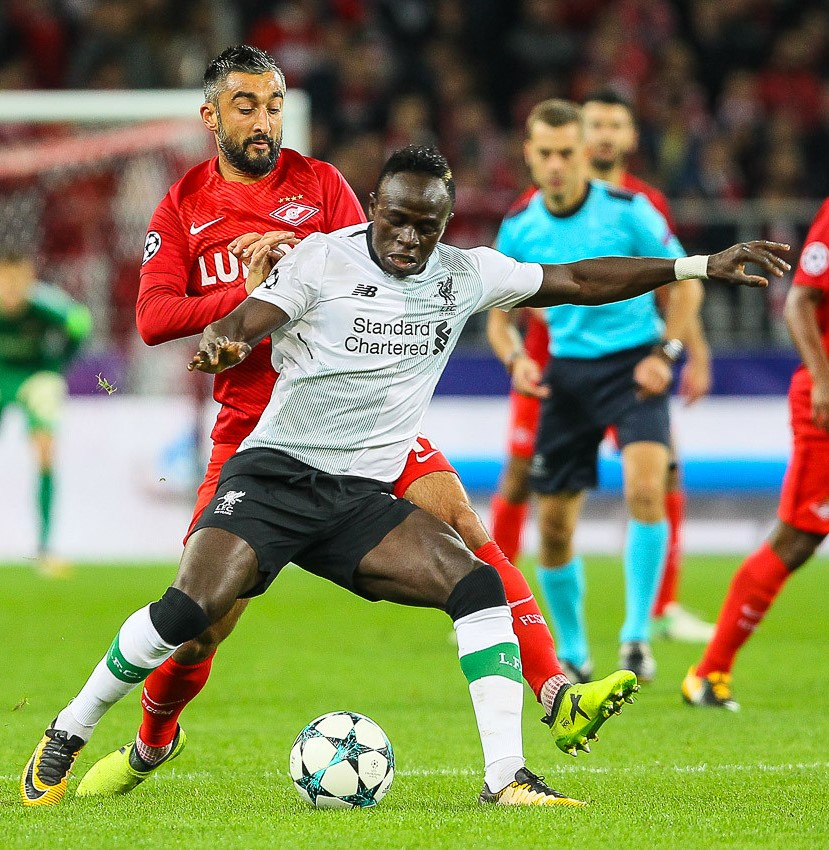
Sadio Mané (pictured in 2017) won the inaugural Sócrates Award.

On 21 September 2022, France Football announced the creation of the 'Sócrates Award' which identifies "the best solidarity actions carried out by committed champions." The award is named after the late Brazilian footballer Sócrates, in honour of the player using his platform as an international footballer to support democratic regimes and opposing the military dictatorship in Brazil at the time. Sócrates co-founded the Corinthians' Democracy, an ideological football movement originating within the Brazilian club Corinthians which fought against the authoritarian regime by promoting democratic practices within the region, including urging people to vote in Brazilian multiparty elections. Liverpool player Sadio Mané won the inaugural award for charity work conducted in his home country, Senegal. The forward financed and reinvested in new facilities within his hometown Bambali, including a school, petrol station and hospital. Mané donated to the Senegalese National Committee fighting against the COVID-19 pandemic. Additionally, he financed a 4G internet service for the town and commissioned a €70-a-month stipend to each family in his hometown. Outside of his charity work, Mané had a successful personal season with Liverpool, winning the FA Cup and EFL Cup and reaching the UEFA Champions League final; he also won the 2021 Africa Cup of Nations with Senegal midway through the European domestic season.

2022 Sócrates Award winner
| Player | Nationality | Position | Club |
|---|---|---|---|
| Sadio Mané | Senegal | Forward | (England) Liverpool |

== Club of the Year ==
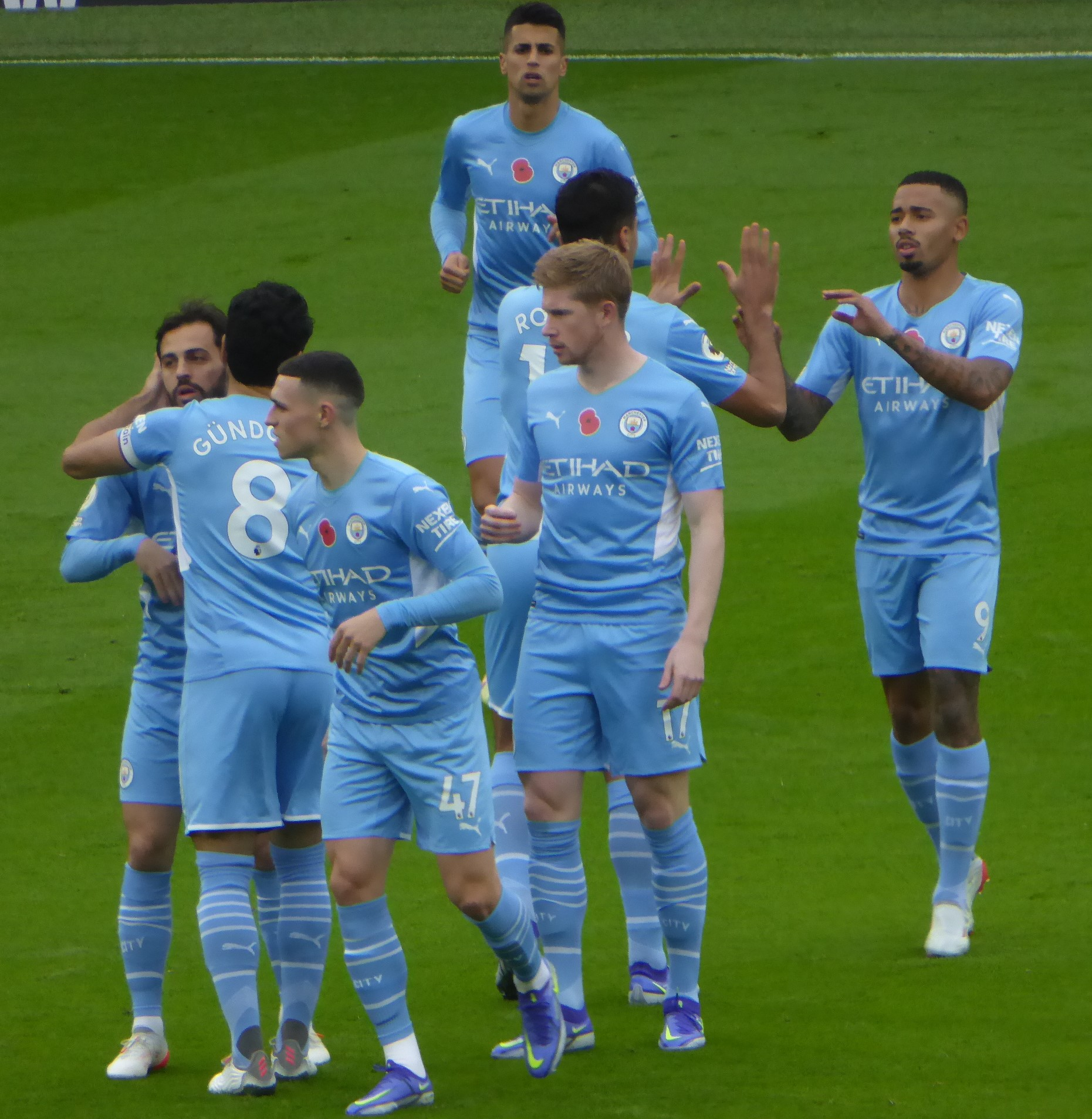
Manchester City won Club of the Year, becoming the second English club to win the award, after Chelsea won the inaugural edition in 2021.

English club Manchester City won Club of the Year ahead of Liverpool, Real Madrid and Lyon. With the most Ballon d'Or and Ballon d'Or Féminin player nominations, Manchester City succeeded Chelsea as the second club to win the award following the award's introduction in 2021. The club had João Cancelo, Kevin De Bruyne, Phil Foden, Riyad Mahrez and Bernardo Silva nominated for the season's Ballon d'Or, following their Premier League triumph. Additionally, Lucy Bronze, from Manchester City Women, was nominated for the Ballon d'Or Féminin, totalling six players from the club. Manchester City finished ahead of Liverpool despite having the same number of player nominations; because City's nominations were spread across the two categories, they were given the award.

2022 Club of the Year ranking
| Rank | Club | Total | Ballon d'Or | Ballon d'Or Féminin |
|---|---|---|---|---|
| 1 | (England) Manchester City; m; w | 6 | João Cancelo (POR); Kevin De Bruyne (BEL); Phil Foden (ENG); Riyad Mahrez (ALG); Bernardo Silva (POR) | Lucy Bronze (ENG) |
| 2 | (England) Liverpool; m; w | 6 | Trent Alexander-Arnold (ENG); Luis Díaz (COL); Fabinho (BRA); Sadio Mané (SEN); Mohamed Salah (EGY); Virgil van Dijk (NED) | None |
| 3 | (Spain) Real Madrid; m; w | 5 | Karim Benzema (FRA); Casemiro (BRA); Thibaut Courtois (BEL); Luka Modrić (CRO); Vinícius Júnior (BRA) | None |
| 3 | (France) Lyon; m; w | 5 | None | Selma Bacha (FRA); Christiane Endler (CHI); Ada Hegerberg (NOR); Catarina Macario (USA); Wendie Renard (FRA) |
