= Ballon d'Or Féminin =

Annual association football award

- Women's Ballon d'Or
- 2026 Ballon d'Or winner Alexia Putellas
- Date: 3 December 2018; 7 years ago
- Location: Paris
- Country: France
- Presented by: France Football
- First award: 2018
- Current holder: (Spain) Alexia Putellas (3rd award)

Highlights
- Most awards: (Spain) Aitana Bonmatí (Spain) Alexia Putellas (3 awards each)
- Most nominations: (France) Wendie Renard (6 nominations)
- Website: francefootball.fr
- Related: Ballon d'Or

The Ballon d'Or Féminin (French pronunciation: [balɔ̃ dɔʁ feminɛ̃]), also known as the Women's Ballon d'Or, is an association football award presented by France Football that honours the player deemed to have performed the best over the previous season.

== Overview ==
The Ballon d'Or was first awarded in 2018, with Ada Hegerberg of Norway becoming the inaugural recipient of the award.

Megan Rapinoe is the only player who was not born in Europe to have won the award. She is also the only player to have not been playing in Europe at the time of winning the award.

Australian striker Sam Kerr and French defender Wendie Renard were the only players to have been nominated for the award every year since its inception until 2023. Sam Kerr was the only player to place in the top 20 nominations every year, and was consistently in the top 7, until her ACL injury in January 2024.

In 2022, Barcelona captain Alexia Putellas became the first to win the award twice and in consecutive years. Aitana Bonmatí won the award three times in 2023, 2024, and 2025. In 2026, Putellas became the second player to win it three times.

Mary Earps won the highest ever rank for a goalkeeper at fifth place in 2023.

== Winners ==
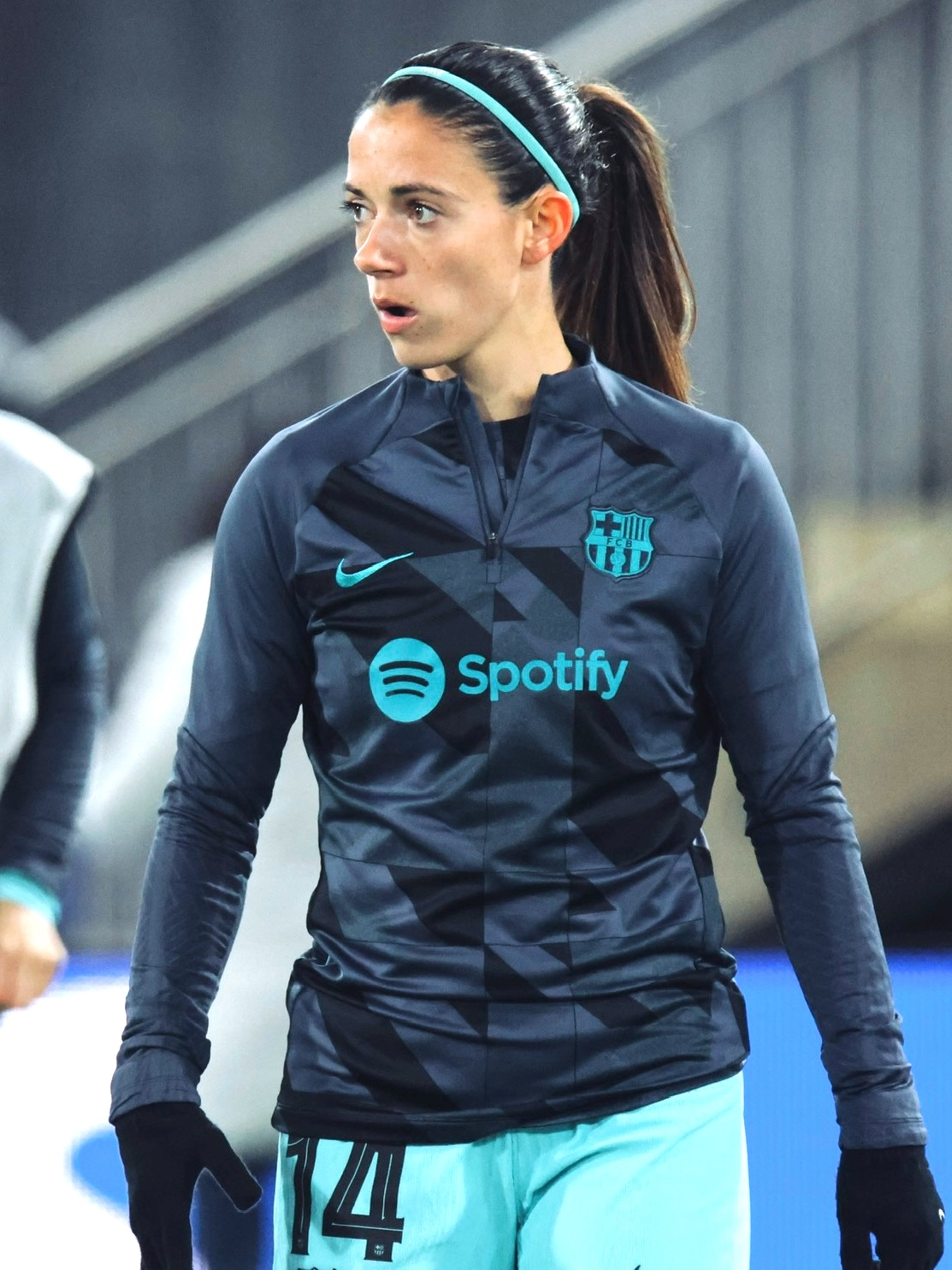
Aitana Bonmatí, the first female player to have won the Women’s Ballon d’Or three times and in consecutive years

Year	Rank	Player	Club(s)	Points
2018	1st	(Norway) Ada Hegerberg	(France) Lyon	136
2018	2nd	(Denmark) Pernille Harder	(Germany) VfL Wolfsburg	130
2018	3rd	(Germany) Dzsenifer Marozsán	(France) Lyon	86
2019	1st	(United States) Megan Rapinoe	(United States) Reign FC (Note: Seattle Reign FC was known as Reign FC during 2019.)	230
2019	2nd	(England) Lucy Bronze	(France) Lyon	94
2019	3rd	(United States) Alex Morgan	(United States) Orlando Pride	68
2020	Not awarded due to the COVID-19 pandemic			
2021	1st	(Spain) Alexia Putellas (1)	(Spain) Barcelona	186
2021	2nd	(Spain) Jenni Hermoso	(Spain) Barcelona	84
2021	3rd	(Australia) Sam Kerr	(England) Chelsea	46
2022	1st	(Spain) Alexia Putellas (2)	(Spain) Barcelona	178
2022	2nd	(England) Beth Mead	(England) Arsenal	152
2022	3rd	(Australia) Sam Kerr	(England) Chelsea	74
2023	1st	(Spain) Aitana Bonmatí (1)	(Spain) Barcelona	266
2023	2nd	(Australia) Sam Kerr	(England) Chelsea	87
2023	3rd	(Spain) Salma Paralluelo	(Spain) Barcelona	49
2024	1st	(Spain) Aitana Bonmatí (2)	(Spain) Barcelona	675
2024	2nd	(Norway) Caroline Graham Hansen	(Spain) Barcelona	392
2024	3rd	(Spain) Salma Paralluelo	(Spain) Barcelona	246
2025	1st	(Spain) Aitana Bonmatí (3)	(Spain) Barcelona	506
2025	2nd	(Spain) Mariona Caldentey	(England) Arsenal	478
2025	3rd	(England) Alessia Russo	(England) Arsenal	420
2026	1st	(Spain) Alexia Putellas (3)	(England) London City (Note: Putellas was signed by London City from Barcelona in July 2026.)	618
2026	2nd	(Poland) Ewa Pajor	(Spain) Barcelona	532
2026	3rd	(Jamaica) Khadija Shaw	(England) Manchester City	344

=== Wins by player ===
Player	Winner	Second place	Third place
(Spain) Aitana Bonmatí	3 (2023, 2024, 2025)	–	–
(Spain) Alexia Putellas	3 (2021, 2022, 2026)	–	–
(Norway) Ada Hegerberg	1 (2018)	–	–
(United States) Megan Rapinoe	1 (2019)	–	–
(Australia) Sam Kerr	–	1 (2023)	2 (2021, 2022)
(Denmark) Pernille Harder	–	1 (2018)	–
(England) Lucy Bronze	–	1 (2019)	–
(Spain) Jenni Hermoso	–	1 (2021)	–
(England) Beth Mead	–	1 (2022)	–
(Norway) Caroline Graham Hansen	–	1 (2024)	–
(Spain) Mariona Caldentey	–	1 (2025)	–
(Poland) Ewa Pajor	–	1 (2026)	–
(Spain) Salma Paralluelo	–	–	2 (2023, 2024)
(Germany) Dzsenifer Marozsán	–	–	1 (2018)
(United States) Alex Morgan	–	–	1 (2019)
(England) Alessia Russo	–	–	1 (2025)
(Jamaica) Khadija Shaw	–	–	1 (2026)

=== Wins by country ===
Country	Players	Wins
Spain	2	6
Norway	1	1
United States	1	1

=== Wins by club ===
Club	Players	Wins
(Spain) Barcelona	2	5
(England) London City	1	1
(France) Lyon	1	1
(United States) Reign FC	1	1

== Controversy ==
The ceremony for the 2023 Ballon d'Or was held during women's international break, meaning women nominated for the Ballon d'Or were unable to attend. 2023 nominee Georgia Stanway expressed frustration she could not be present at this "potentially once-in-a-lifetime opportunity", having an Olympic qualifier match in another country less than 24 hours from the ceremony. Only seven out of thirty women were able to be at the ceremony. These attendees had games the next day and missed training, but came to accept the award for best club team of 2023, given to Barcelona. Stanway called for better scheduling with women in mind so more female footballers could attend. England manager Sarina Wiegman expressed disappointment that the players' hard work would not be properly rewarded due to this scheduling conflict with international duty.

In 2024 the problem remained unfixed, with Wiegman, who was unable to attend the ceremony despite being nominated for Coach of the Year, saying, "Of course, that's really disappointing, because that's a moment to celebrate women's soccer and to come together as a whole community in the women's soccer game, and the whole soccer world." Nominee Lucy Bronze, unable to attend, expressed that the Ballon d’Or organizers treat women as a "second thought." Coach of the Year winner Emma Hayes missed receiving her award while preparing the United States for a match. None of the five American Ballon d'Or nominees attended. Six of thirty nominees were able to be at the ceremony.

The Ballon d'Or was the only award for women during this event, with no women's equivalent of the Kopa Trophy, Yashin Trophy, and Gerd Müller Trophy that are given to men. 2022 second place Ballon d'Or nominee Beth Mead said, "[The Ballon d’Or] is such a prestigious award. But then it was a tick box to have women there but they weren't doing it right."

France Football and UEFA promote men's strikers, goalkeepers, and youth by offering awards and bringing recognition to these men, but fail to do the same for women. The Guardian writer Tom Garry named Salma Paralluelo, Linda Caicedo, Alyssa Thompson, and Mary Earps as players deserving of these trophies.

Resolution

For the first time, in 2025, the Ballon d'Or ceremony was held outside of women's international break, allowing women to attend. Women were finally recognized for the Yashin Trophy, given to the best goalkeeper, as Ann-Katrin Berger, Hannah Hampton, Cata Coll, Chiamaka Nnadozie, and Daphne van Domselaar were the first nominees. Hannah Hampton received the trophy. It was also the first year women were able to receive the Kopa Trophy, given to the best young player, with Michelle Agyemang, Vicky López, Linda Caicedo, Claudia Martínez Ovando, and Wieke Kaptein being the inaugural five nominated. Vicky López won the award.

== See also ==
- List of sports awards honoring women
- The Best FIFA Women's Player
- The Best FIFA Football Awards
