= Yashin Trophy =

Annual association football award presented by France Football

- Trophée Yachine
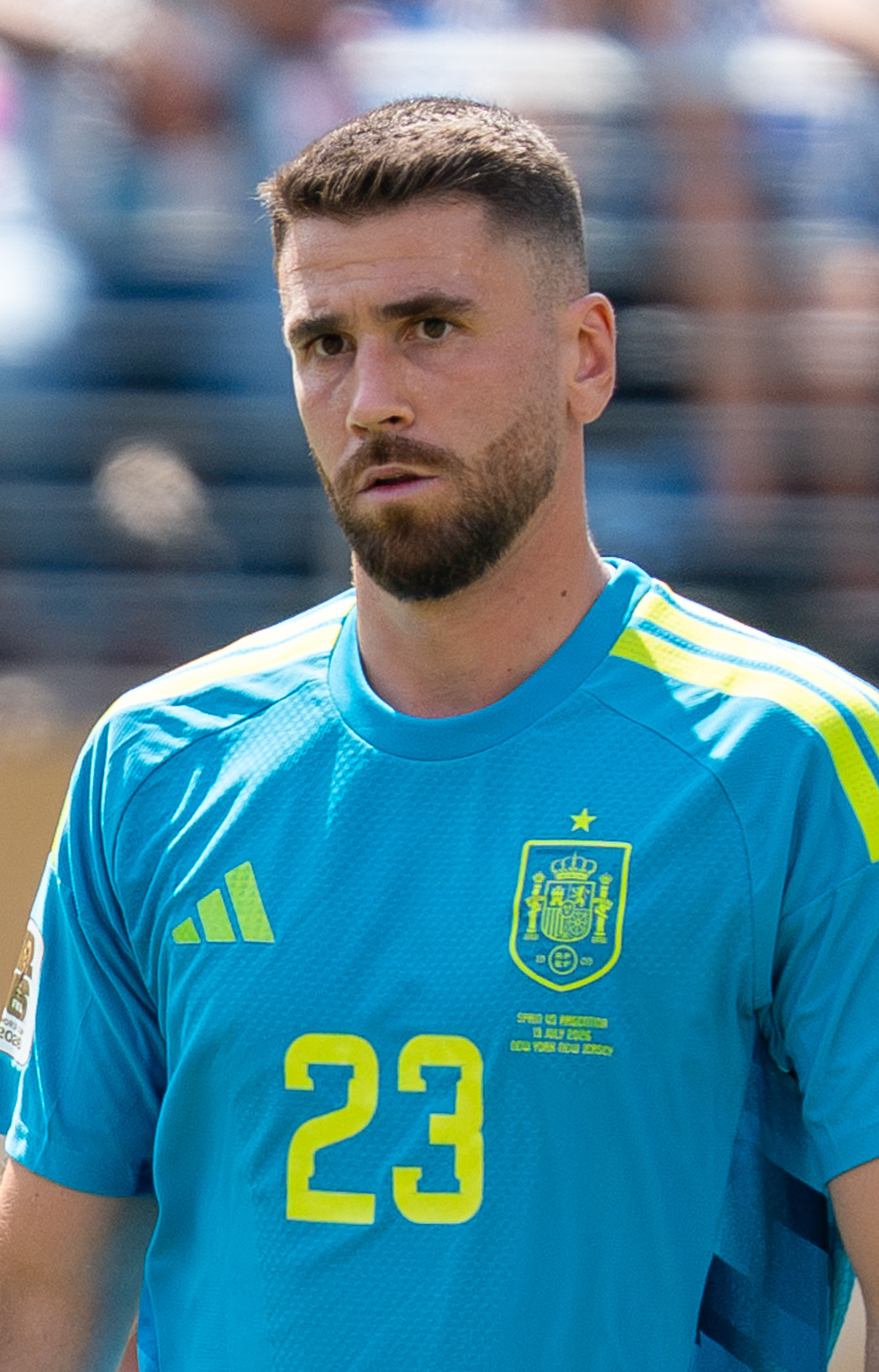
- Unai Simón is the current men’s award holder
- Awarded for: Best goalkeeper
- Date: 2 December 2019; 6 years ago
- Location: Paris, France
- Presented by: France Football
- First award: 2019
- Current holder: (Spain) Unai Simón (1st award) (Spain) Cata Coll (1st award)

Highlights
- Most awards: (Italy) Gianluigi Donnarumma (Argentina) Emiliano Martínez (2 awards each)
- Most nominations: (Slovenia) Jan Oblak (Argentina) Emiliano Martínez (Belgium) Thibaut Courtois (Brazil) Ederson (4 nominations each)
- Website: francefootball.fr

The Yashin Trophy (French: Trophée Yachine) or Goalkeeper of the Year is an association football award presented annually by France Football to the best performing goalkeeper in the world.

The award is named after former Soviet legendary goalkeeper Lev Yashin, and the winner is selected by football journalists as part of Ballon d'Or ceremony since its creation in 2019.

== Men's winners ==
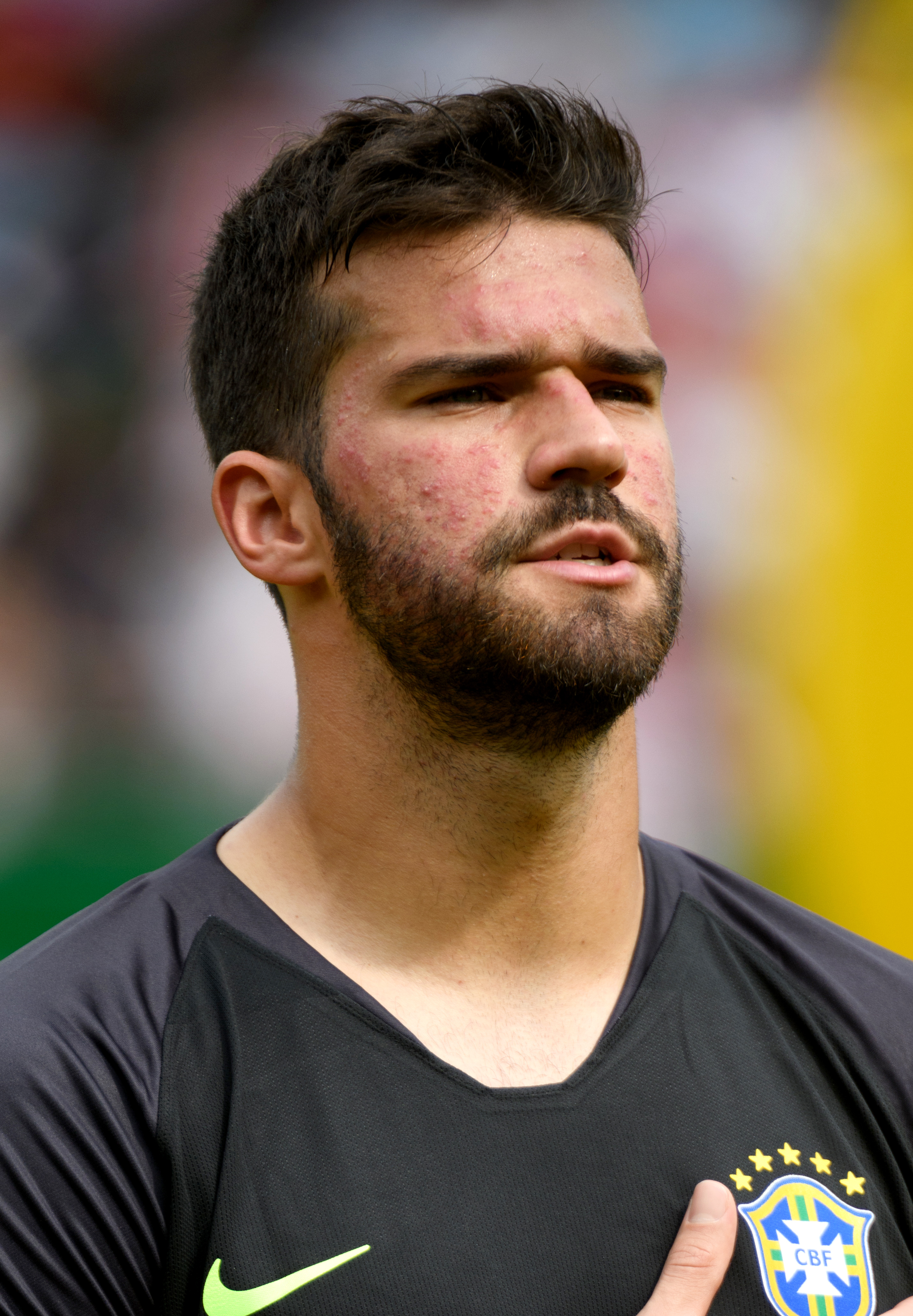
Alisson, the inaugural award winner

Player (X)	Denotes the number of times the player had won the award at that time (for players with multiple wins)

Year	Rank	Player	Club	Points
2019	1st	(Brazil) Alisson	(England) Liverpool	795
2019	2nd	(Germany) Marc-André ter Stegen	(Spain) Barcelona	284
2019	3rd	(Brazil) Ederson	(England) Manchester City	142
2020	Not awarded due to the COVID-19 pandemic			
2021	1st	(Italy) Gianluigi Donnarumma (1)	(France) Paris Saint-Germain (Note: Donnarumma was signed by Paris Saint-Germain from Milan midway through 2021.)	594
2021	2nd	(Senegal) Édouard Mendy	(England) Chelsea	404
2021	3rd	(Slovenia) Jan Oblak	(Spain) Atlético Madrid	155
2022	1st	(Belgium) Thibaut Courtois	(Spain) Real Madrid	456
2022	2nd	(Brazil) Alisson	(England) Liverpool	108
2022	3rd	(Brazil) Ederson	(England) Manchester City	72
2023	1st	(Argentina) Emiliano Martínez (1)	(England) Aston Villa	290
2023	2nd	(Brazil) Ederson	(England) Manchester City	197
2023	3rd	(Morocco) Yassine Bounou	(Spain) Sevilla	154
2024	1st	(Argentina) Emiliano Martínez (2)	(England) Aston Villa	276
2024	2nd	(Spain) Unai Simón	(Spain) Athletic Bilbao	213
2024	3rd	(Ukraine) Andriy Lunin	(Spain) Real Madrid	112
2025	1st	(Italy) Gianluigi Donnarumma (2)	(France) Paris Saint-Germain	486
2025	2nd	(Brazil) Alisson	(England) Liverpool	120
2025	3rd	(Switzerland) Yann Sommer	(Italy) Inter Milan	112
2026	1st	(Spain) Unai Simón	(Spain) Athletic Bilbao	351
2026	2nd	(Spain) David Raya	(England) Arsenal	223
2026	3rd	(Belgium) Thibaut Courtois	(Spain) Real Madrid	77

=== Wins by player ===
Player	Winner	Second place	Third place
(Italy) Gianluigi Donnarumma	2 (2021, 2025)	–	–
(Argentina) Emiliano Martínez	2 (2023, 2024)	–	–
(Brazil) Alisson	1 (2019)	2 (2022, 2025)	–
(Spain) Unai Simón	1 (2026)	1 (2024)	–
(Belgium) Thibaut Courtois	1 (2022)	–	1 (2026)
(Brazil) Ederson	–	1 (2023)	2 (2019, 2022)
(Germany) Marc-André ter Stegen	–	1 (2019)	–
(Senegal) Édouard Mendy	–	1 (2021)	–
(Spain) David Raya	–	1 (2026)	–
(Slovenia) Jan Oblak	–	–	1 (2021)
(Morocco) Yassine Bounou	–	–	1 (2023)
(Ukraine) Andriy Lunin	–	–	1 (2024)
(Switzerland) Yann Sommer	–	–	1 (2025)

=== Wins by country ===
Country	Players	Wins
Argentina	1	2
Italy	1	2
Belgium	1	1
Brazil	1	1
Spain	1	1

=== Wins by club ===
Club	Players	Wins
(England) Aston Villa	1	2
(France) Paris Saint-Germain	1	2
(England) Liverpool	1	1
(Spain) Real Madrid	1	1
(Spain) Athletic Bilbao	1	1

== Women's winners ==
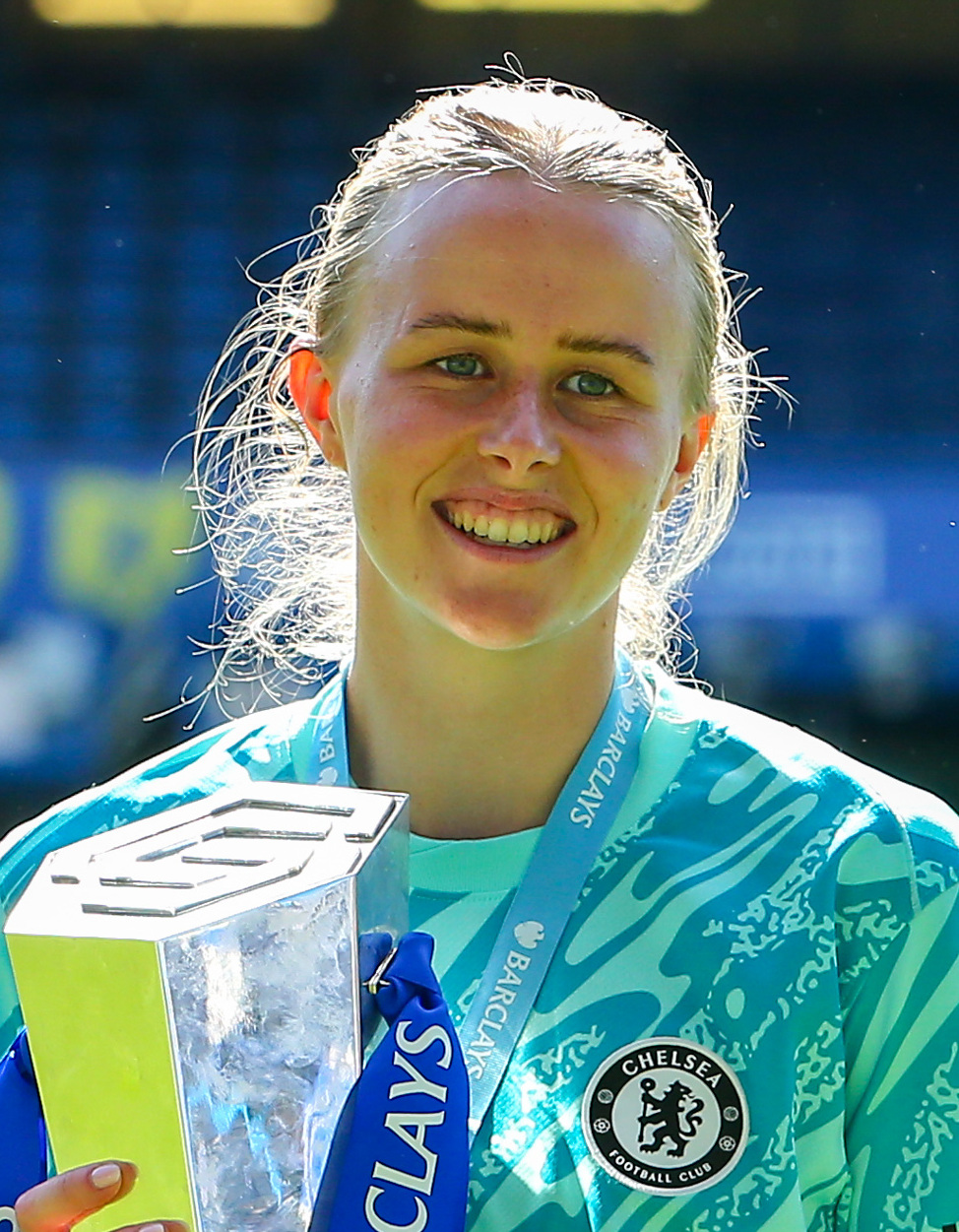
Hannah Hampton, the women's inaugural award winner

Player (X)	Denotes the number of times the player had won the award at that time (for players with multiple wins)

Year	Rank	Player	Club	Points
2025	1st	(England) Hannah Hampton	(England) Chelsea	88
2025	2nd	(Germany) Ann-Katrin Berger	(United States) Gotham FC	26
2025	3rd	(Spain) Cata Coll	(Spain) Barcelona	25
2026	1st	(Spain) Cata Coll	(Spain) Barcelona	85
2026	2nd	(Germany) Ann-Katrin Berger	(United States) Gotham FC	22
2026	3rd	(Japan) Ayaka Kamashita	(England) Manchester City	21

=== Wins by player ===
Player	Winner	Second place	Third place
(Spain) Cata Coll	1 (2026)	–	1 (2025)
(England) Hannah Hampton	1 (2025)	–	–
(Germany) Ann-Katrin Berger	–	2 (2025, 2026)	–
(Japan) Ayaka Kamashita	–	–	1 (2026)

=== Wins by country ===
Country	Players	Wins
England	1	1
Spain	1	1

=== Wins by club ===
Club	Players	Wins
(England) Chelsea	1	1
(Spain) Barcelona	1	1
