= France Football European Team of the Year =

European association football award

- Sport: Association football
- League: Football leagues affilied to UEFA
- Awarded for: Best performing men's European club of the season
- Local name: Challenge Européen de Football (French)
- Sponsored by: Adidas
- Country: France
- Presented by: France Football

History
- First award: 1968
- Editions: 23
- Final award: 1990
- First winner: (Portugal) Benfica
- Most wins: (Netherlands) Ajax (5 times)
- Most recent: Ex æquo (Italy) Juventus & (Italy) Milan AC

The France Football European Team of the Year (French: Challenge Européen de Football), also known as European Challenge Interclubs (Challenge Européen Interclubs), was an association football award conferred by French sports magazine France Football with the sponsorship of German multinational corporation Adidas. It was held in Europe for the first time in 1968 based in men's clubs' performance in association and UEFA competitions during the last sporting season disputed, being assigned weighted scores according with the results achieved by each team, forming a virtual league.

The award was conferred annually during 23 seasons between late 1960s to late 1980s in the same ceremony which was given the European Golden Shoe to the clubs' men's leading goalscorer in the continent and, each four years, the FIFA World Cup and UEFA European Championship awards, being Adidas the main sponsor of both competitions.

The prize was officially discontinued following the Adidas decision of not renewing its commercial contract with the French publication after it awarded the 1990 winner teams in a gala held in Paris, in January 1991. Subsequently, the Germany's designs and manufacturers corporation became the main sponsor of the FIFA World Player of the Year Award, established in that year.

== Roll of Honour ==
Year	Winner (s)	Refs
1968	(Portugal) Benfica	
1969	(Netherlands) Ajax	
1970	(Scotland) Celtic	
1971	Ex æquo (Netherlands) Ajax & (England) Arsenal	
1972	(Netherlands) Ajax	
1973	(Netherlands) Ajax	
1974	Ex æquo (Germany) Bayern Munich & (Netherlands) Feyenoord	
1975	(Germany) Borussia Mönchengladbach	
1976	(England) Liverpool	
1977	(Italy) Juventus	
1978	(England) Liverpool	
1979	(England) Nottingham Forest	
1980	(Spain) Real Madrid	
1981	(England) Ipswich Town	
1982	(England) Liverpool	
1983	(Scotland) Aberdeen	
1984	(England) Liverpool	
1985	(England) Everton	
1986	(Spain) Real Madrid	
1987	(Netherlands) Ajax	
1988	(Netherlands) PSV Eindhoven	
1989	(Italy) Milan AC	
1990	Ex æquo (Italy) Juventus & (Italy) Milan AC	

=== By club ===
Club	Total
(Netherlands) Ajax	5
(England) Liverpool	4
(Spain) Real Madrid	2
(Italy) Juventus	2
(Italy) Milan AC	2
(Portugal) Benfica	1
(Scotland) Celtic	1
(England) Arsenal	1
(Germany) Bayern Munich	1
(Netherlands) Feyenoord	1
(Germany) Borussia Mönchengladbach	1
(England) Nottingham Forest	1
(England) Ipswich Town	1
(Scotland) Aberdeen	1
(England) Everton	1
(Netherlands) PSV Eindhoven	1

=== By country ===
Country	Teams	Total
England	5	8
Netherlands	3	6
Italy	2	4
Germany	2	2
Scotland	2	2
Spain	1	2
Portugal	1	1
