= Gerd Müller Trophy =

Annual association football award

- Trophée Gerd Müller
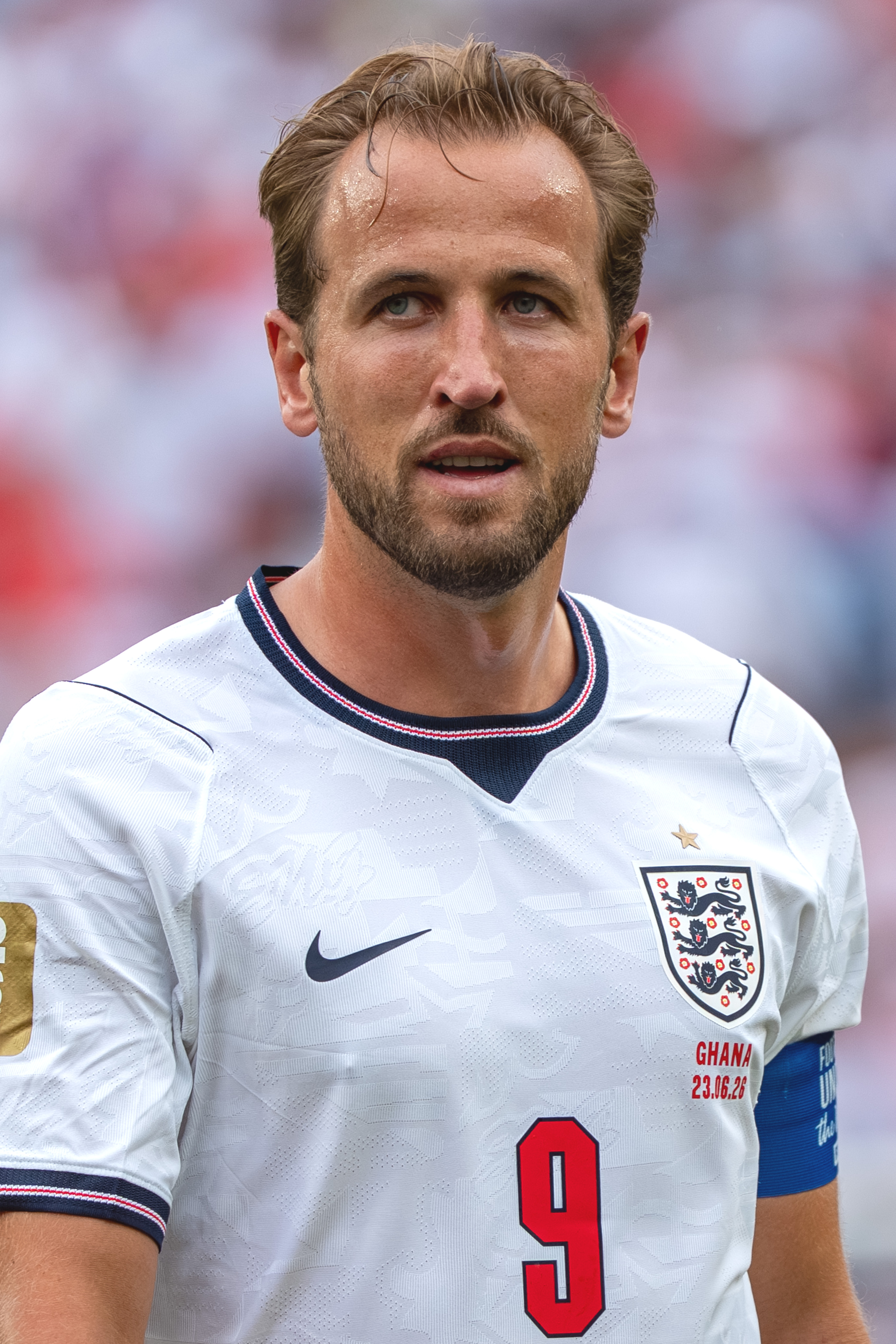
- Harry Kane is the current award holder
- Date: 29 November 2021; 4 years ago
- Location: Paris
- Country: France
- Presented by: France Football
- First award: 2021
- Current holder: (England) Harry Kane (2nd award)

Highlights
- Most awards: (Poland) Robert Lewandowski; (England) Harry Kane (2 awards each)
- Website: francefootball.fr
- Related: Ballon d'Or

The Gerd Müller Trophy or Striker of the Year, previously known as Best Striker Award in its first edition, is a football award presented annually by France Football to the highest-scoring footballer in the previous season, taking into account goals scored for both European clubs and national teams.

It was established in 2021, taking into account that calendar year (while, from the second edition, the award is based on the number of goals scored throughout a season).

Starting with the second edition in 2022, the award was renamed after German striker Gerd Müller who died in August 2021.

The inaugural winner was Polish striker Robert Lewandowski; he won the first edition in 2021 by scoring 64 goals over the year and then repeated a year later, having scored 57 goals in 56 appearances over the 2021–22 season.

== Men's winners ==
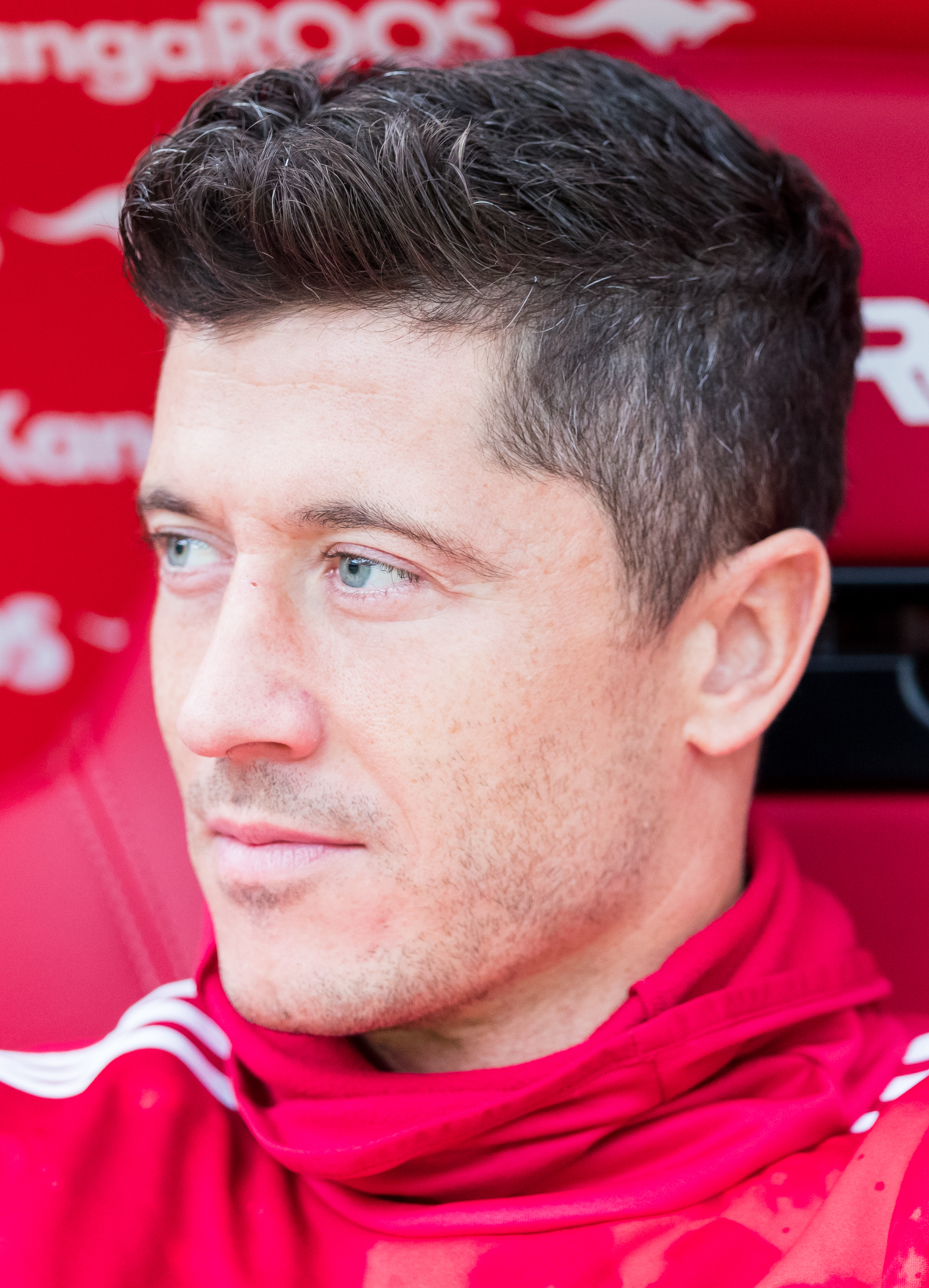
Robert Lewandowski, the inaugural award winner

Key

Year	Year of award ceremony.
Club	Club for which the award-winning player was active during the assessment period (until 2021: calendar year, since 2022: previous European season).
Goals	Total goals in the rating period.
Club goals	Competitive goals for the club in the assessment period.
National goals	Goals for the national team in the rating period.
Matches	Total competitive matches for club and national team in the assessment period.

Year	Player(s)	Nationality	Club(s)	Goals	Club goals	National goals	Matches	Ref.
2021 (Note: The 2021 award, known at the time as the "Striker of the Year Award", was awarded based on the results of the 2021 calendar year until the time of the ceremony on 29 November 2021. When receiving the award, Lewandowski scored a total of 64 goals in 54 matches.)	Robert Lewandowski (1)	Poland	(Germany) Bayern Munich	69	58	11	59	
2022	Robert Lewandowski (2)	Poland	(Germany) Bayern Munich	57	50	7	56	
2023	Erling Haaland	Norway	(England) Manchester City	56	52	4	57	
2024	Harry Kane (1)	England	(Germany) Bayern Munich	52	44	8	54	
2024	Kylian Mbappé	France	(France) Paris Saint-Germain	52	44	8	57	
2025	Viktor Gyökeres	Sweden	(Portugal) Sporting CP	63	54	9	63	
2026	Harry Kane (2)	England	(Germany) Bayern Munich	73	61	12	65	

=== Wins by nation ===
Country	Players	Wins
Poland	1	2
England	1	2
Norway	1	1
France	1	1
Sweden	1	1

=== Wins by club ===
Club	Players	Wins
(Germany) Bayern Munich	2	4
(England) Manchester City	1	1
(France) Paris Saint-Germain	1	1
(Portugal) Sporting CP	1	1

== Women's winners ==
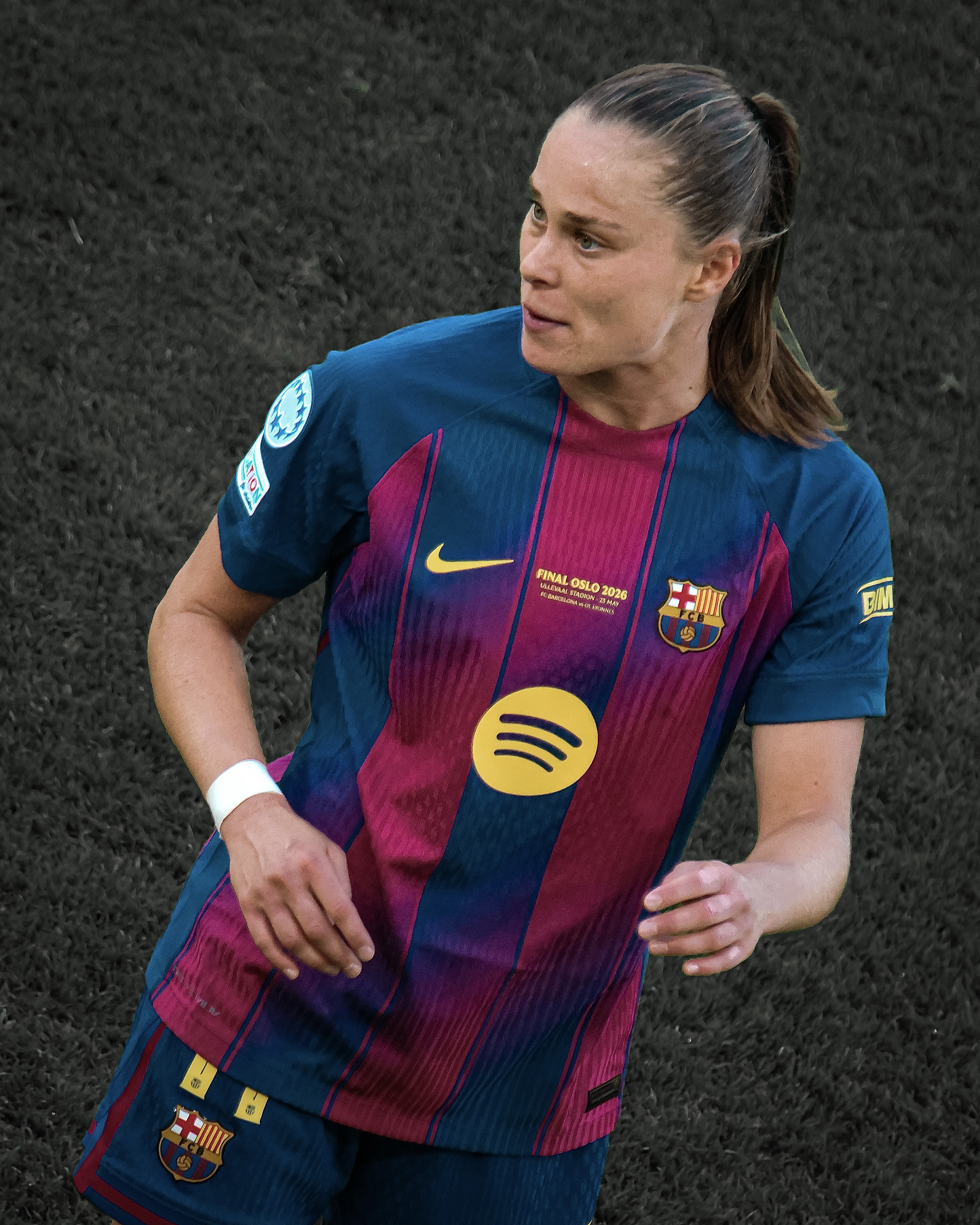
Ewa Pajor, the women's inaugural award winner

Key

Year	Year of award ceremony.
Club	Club for which the award-winning player was active during the assessment period (since 2025: previous European season).
Goals	Total goals in the rating period.
Club goals	Competitive goals for the club in the assessment period.
National goals	Goals for the national team in the rating period.
Matches	Total competitive matches for club and national team in the assessment period.

Year	Player(s)	Nationality	Club(s)	Goals	Club goals	National goals	Matches	Ref.
2025	Ewa Pajor	Poland	(Spain) Barcelona	52	43	9	59	
2026	Charlyn Corral	Mexico	(Mexico) C.F. Pachuca	43	43	0	46	

=== Wins by nation ===
Country	Players	Wins
Poland	1	1
Mexico	1	1

=== Wins by club ===
Club	Players	Wins
(Spain) Barcelona	1	1
(Mexico) C.F. Pachuca	1	1

== See also ==
- Ballon d'Or
- European Golden Shoe
- European association football club records and statistics § Most goals in a season in all club competitions
