= 2023 Ballon d'Or =

Annual association football award event in France

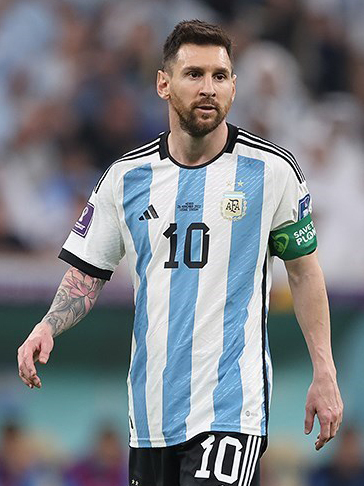
- 2023 Ballon d'Or winner, Lionel Messi
- Date: 30 October 2023
- Location: Théâtre du Châtelet, Paris
- Presented by: France Football
- Hosted by: Sandy Heribert; Didier Drogba

Highlights
- Ballon d'Or: (Argentina) Lionel Messi (8th award)
- Ballon d'Or Féminin: (Spain) Aitana Bonmatí (1st award)
- Kopa Trophy: (England) Jude Bellingham (1st award)
- Yashin Trophy: (Argentina) Emiliano Martínez (1st award)
- Sócrates Award: (Brazil) Vinícius Júnior (1st award)
- Website: ballondor.com

The 2023 Ballon d'Or (lit. '2023 Golden Ball'), was the 67th annual ceremony of the Ballon d'Or, presented by France Football magazine, recognising the best footballers in the world in the 2022–2023 season. For the second time in the history of the award, it was given based on the results of the season instead of the calendar year, with the season starting on 1 August 2022 and ending 31 July 2023. The nominees were announced on 6 September 2023 and the ceremony took place on 30 October 2023.

Lionel Messi won the award for a record-extending eighth time after leading Argentina in their victorious 2022 FIFA World Cup campaign and winning Ligue 1 with Paris Saint-Germain. Messi became the only player in history to win the award with three different clubs—having joined Inter Miami in July—and the only one to win it while playing outside Europe, his win coming after not being nominated in 2022 for the first time since 2006, with this year being his opposite’s (Cristiano Ronaldo) first season without nomination, after 18 years in a row.

Aitana Bonmatí won her first Ballon d'Or Féminin, after she won the 2022–23 Women's Champions League with FC Barcelona and the 2023 FIFA Women's World Cup with Spain. In the other award categories, Jude Bellingham was given the Kopa Trophy, Emiliano Martínez won the Yashin Trophy, the Sócrates Award was given to Vinícius Júnior, Erling Haaland claimed the Gerd Müller Trophy, the Men's Club of the Year award went to Manchester City for the second year in a row and FC Barcelona received the inaugural Women's Club of the Year award.

== Ballon d'Or ==
Club listed is the one which the player represented during the 2022–23 season. For players who appeared for multiple clubs during the season (between 1 August 2022 and 31 July 2023), only the most recent club is listed.

Thirty players were nominated for the 2023 Ballon d'Or.

2023 Ballon d'Or ranking
Rank	Player	Nationality	Position	Club	Points
1	Lionel Messi	Argentina	Forward	(United States) Inter Miami (Note: Messi was signed by Inter Miami from Paris Saint-Germain during the season.)	462
2	Erling Haaland	Norway	Forward	(England) Manchester City	357
3	Kylian Mbappé	France	Forward	(France) Paris Saint-Germain	270
4	Kevin De Bruyne	Belgium	Midfielder	(England) Manchester City	100
5	Rodri	Spain	Midfielder	(England) Manchester City	57
6	Vinícius Júnior	Brazil	Forward	(Spain) Real Madrid	49
7	Julián Álvarez	Argentina	Forward	(England) Manchester City	28
8	Victor Osimhen	Nigeria	Forward	(Italy) Napoli	24
9	Bernardo Silva	Portugal	Midfielder	(England) Manchester City	20
10	Luka Modrić	Croatia	Midfielder	(Spain) Real Madrid	19
11	Mohamed Salah	Egypt	Forward	(England) Liverpool	13
12	Robert Lewandowski	Poland	Forward	(Spain) Barcelona	12
13	Yassine Bounou	Morocco	Goalkeeper	(Spain) Sevilla (Note: Bounou was signed by Al-Hilal from Sevilla after the end of season.)	10
14	İlkay Gündoğan	Germany	Midfielder	(England) Manchester City (Note: Gündoğan was signed by Barcelona from Manchester City after the end of season.)	8
15	Emiliano Martínez	Argentina	Goalkeeper	(England) Aston Villa	7
16	Karim Benzema	France	Forward	(Spain) Real Madrid (Note: Benzema was signed by Al-Ittihad from Real Madrid after the end of season.)	6
17	Khvicha Kvaratskhelia	Georgia	Forward	(Italy) Napoli	6
18	Jude Bellingham	England	Midfielder	(Germany) Borussia Dortmund (Note: Bellingham was signed by Real Madrid from Borussia Dortmund after the end of season.)	5
19	Harry Kane	England	Forward	(England) Tottenham Hotspur	4
20	Lautaro Martínez	Argentina	Forward	(Italy) Inter Milan	4
21	Antoine Griezmann	France	Forward	(Spain) Atlético Madrid	4
22	Kim Min-jae	South Korea	Defender	(Italy) Napoli (Note: Kim was signed by Bayern Munich from Napoli after the end of season.)	3
23	André Onana	Cameroon	Goalkeeper	(Italy) Inter Milan (Note: Onana was signed by Manchester United from Inter Milan after the end of season.)	2
24	Bukayo Saka	England	Forward	(England) Arsenal	1
25	Joško Gvardiol	Croatia	Defender	(Germany) RB Leipzig	1
26	Jamal Musiala	Germany	Midfielder	(Germany) Bayern Munich	0
27	Nicolò Barella	Italy	Midfielder	(Italy) Inter Milan	0
28	Randal Kolo Muani	France	Forward	(Germany) Eintracht Frankfurt	0
28	Martin Ødegaard	Norway	Midfielder	(England) Arsenal	0
30	Rúben Dias	Portugal	Defender	(England) Manchester City	0

Ballon D'Or Detailed Votes by Country
Country	Messi	Haaland	Mbappé	De Bruyne	Rodri	Vinicius Jr.	Alvarez	Osimhen	Bernardo Silva	Modric	Salah	Lewandowski	Bounou	Gündogan	E. Martinez	Kvaratskhelia	Benzema	Bellingham	Kane	Griezmann	L. Martinez	Min-jae Kim	Onana	Gvardiol	Saka
Albania	6	4	3	0	1	0	2	0	0	0	0	0	0	0	0	0	0	0	0	0	0	0	0	0	0
Algeria	4	6	0	2	0	0	0	0	3	0	0	1	0	0	0	0	0	0	0	0	0	0	0	0	0
Argentina	6	0	3	0	0	0	4	0	0	0	0	0	0	0	2	0	0	0	0	0	1	0	0	0	0
Armenia	6	3	4	0	0	0	0	0	0	2	0	0	0	0	0	1	0	0	0	0	0	0	0	0	0
Australia	6	4	3	2	0	0	0	1	0	0	0	0	0	0	0	0	0	0	0	0	0	0	0	0	0
Austria	6	4	3	2	0	0	0	0	0	0	0	0	0	1	0	0	0	0	0	0	0	0	0	0	0
Bahrain	3	6	4	0	0	2	0	0	0	0	1	0	0	0	0	0	0	0	0	0	0	0	0	0	0
Belarus	6	4	3	2	0	0	0	0	0	0	0	0	0	0	0	0	0	0	1	0	0	0	0	0	0
Belgium	6	4	2	3	0	0	0	0	1	0	0	0	0	0	0	0	0	0	0	0	0	0	0	0	0
Benin	4	6	3	2	0	0	1	0	0	0	0	0	0	0	0	0	0	0	0	0	0	0	0	0	0
Bolivia	6	4	3	2	0	0	0	0	0	0	0	0	0	0	0	0	1	0	0	0	0	0	0	0	0
Bosnia and Herzegovina	6	4	0	3	1	0	0	2	0	0	0	0	0	0	0	0	0	0	0	0	0	0	0	0	0
Brazil	6	4	3	0	1	0	0	0	0	2	0	0	0	0	0	0	0	0	0	0	0	0	0	0	0
Bulgaria	4	2	6	1	0	0	0	0	0	3	0	0	0	0	0	0	0	0	0	0	0	0	0	0	0
Cameroon	0	0	6	4	3	0	0	0	1	0	0	0	0	0	0	0	0	0	0	0	0	0	2	0	0
Canada	6	4	3	0	1	2	0	0	0	0	0	0	0	0	0	0	0	0	0	0	0	0	0	0	0
Cape Verde	0	6	3	0	4	1	0	0	2	0	0	0	0	0	0	0	0	0	0	0	0	0	0	0	0
Chile	6	3	4	0	1	0	0	0	0	2	0	0	0	0	0	0	0	0	0	0	0	0	0	0	0
China	6	4	1	3	2	0	0	0	0	0	0	0	0	0	0	0	0	0	0	0	0	0	0	0	0
Colombia	6	1	4	0	0	3	0	0	2	0	0	0	0	0	0	0	0	0	0	0	0	0	0	0	0
Costa Rica	6	4	3	2	1	0	0	0	0	0	0	0	0	0	0	0	0	0	0	0	0	0	0	0	0
Croatia	6	4	3	0	0	0	2	0	0	1	0	0	0	0	0	0	0	0	0	0	0	0	0	0	0
Czech Republic	4	3	6	0	2	0	0	0	0	1	0	0	0	0	0	0	0	0	0	0	0	0	0	0	0
Denmark	3	6	0	4	0	0	0	2	0	0	0	0	0	1	0	0	0	0	0	0	0	0	0	0	0
Ecuador	4	3	6	1	0	0	0	0	0	0	0	0	0	0	0	0	0	0	2	0	0	0	0	0	0
Egypt	6	4	2	1	0	0	0	0	0	0	3	0	0	0	0	0	0	0	0	0	0	0	0	0	0
El Salvador	0	6	4	2	1	0	0	0	0	0	0	0	0	0	0	0	0	0	0	0	3	0	0	0	0
England	6	4	3	0	2	0	0	0	0	0	0	0	0	0	0	0	0	1	0	0	0	0	0	0	0
Equatorial Guinea	6	3	0	4	0	0	0	2	0	0	0	1	0	0	0	0	0	0	0	0	0	0	0	0	0
Finland	6	4	3	1	0	0	0	0	0	0	0	0	0	0	0	0	0	0	0	0	0	2	0	0	0
France	3	6	4	2	0	1	0	0	0	0	0	0	0	0	0	0	0	0	0	0	0	0	0	0	0
Gabon	4	6	1	0	3	0	2	0	0	0	0	0	0	0	0	0	0	0	0	0	0	0	0	0	0
Georgia	6	0	4	0	1	0	0	0	0	0	0	0	0	2	0	3	0	0	0	0	0	0	0	0	0
Germany	6	4	3	2	0	0	0	0	0	0	0	0	0	1	0	0	0	0	0	0	0	0	0	0	0
Ghana	4	6	3	2	0	0	0	1	0	0	0	0	0	0	0	0	0	0	0	0	0	0	0	0	0
Greece	4	6	2	3	0	0	0	1	0	0	0	0	0	0	0	0	0	0	0	0	0	0	0	0	0
Guinea	0	6	3	0	0	2	4	0	0	0	0	0	0	1	0	0	0	0	0	0	0	0	0	0	0
Honduras	6	1	2	0	0	0	3	0	0	0	0	0	0	0	0	0	0	0	0	4	0	0	0	0	0
Hungary	6	3	4	0	0	1	0	0	0	0	0	2	0	0	0	0	0	0	0	0	0	0	0	0	0
Iceland	4	6	3	2	0	0	0	0	0	0	0	0	0	0	0	0	0	0	1	0	0	0	0	0	0
India	6	4	3	0	0	0	0	2	0	0	0	0	0	0	0	0	0	0	0	0	0	0	0	1	0
Iran	6	4	3	0	1	2	0	0	0	0	0	0	0	0	0	0	0	0	0	0	0	0	0	0	0
Iraq	6	3	4	0	0	0	0	0	0	0	1	0	0	0	0	0	0	2	0	0	0	0	0	0	0
Ireland	6	4	1	2	3	0	0	0	0	0	0	0	0	0	0	0	0	0	0	0	0	0	0	0	0
Israel	6	4	3	2	0	0	0	0	0	0	0	0	0	0	0	0	0	1	0	0	0	0	0	0	0
Italy	6	4	3	0	2	0	0	0	0	0	0	0	0	0	0	1	0	0	0	0	0	0	0	0	0
Ivory Coast	1	0	6	0	3	0	2	4	0	0	0	0	0	0	0	0	0	0	0	0	0	0	0	0	0
Jamaica	6	4	3	0	0	2	1	0	0	0	0	0	0	0	0	0	0	0	0	0	0	0	0	0	0
Japan	3	6	4	0	0	0	0	0	0	1	0	0	2	0	0	0	0	0	0	0	0	0	0	0	0
Jordan	0	6	4	0	0	2	0	0	0	0	3	0	0	0	0	1	0	0	0	0	0	0	0	0	0
Kyrgyzstan	3	6	4	2	1	0	0	0	0	0	0	0	0	0	0	0	0	0	0	0	0	0	0	0	0
Lebanon	6	3	0	0	4	0	2	0	0	0	0	0	0	0	0	0	1	0	0	0	0	0	0	0	0
Luxembourg	6	4	3	2	0	1	0	0	0	0	0	0	0	0	0	0	0	0	0	0	0	0	0	0	0
Mexico	6	3	4	0	0	0	2	0	0	0	0	1	0	0	0	0	0	0	0	0	0	0	0	0	0
Montenegro	6	3	4	0	1	0	0	0	0	0	0	0	0	0	2	0	0	0	0	0	0	0	0	0	0
Morocco	6	1	3	4	0	0	0	0	0	0	0	0	2	0	0	0	0	0	0	0	0	0	0	0	0
Netherlands	2	6	4	1	0	0	3	0	0	0	0	0	0	0	0	0	0	0	0	0	0	0	0	0	0
Nigeria	6	4	3	0	0	0	0	2	0	0	0	0	0	0	0	0	0	1	0	0	0	0	0	0	0
North Macedonia	4	6	3	2	0	0	0	1	0	0	0	0	0	0	0	0	0	0	0	0	0	0	0	0	0
Northern Ireland	6	4	3	0	2	0	0	0	0	1	0	0	0	0	0	0	0	0	0	0	0	0	0	0	0
Norway	4	6	0	2	1	3	0	0	0	0	0	0	0	0	0	0	0	0	0	0	0	0	0	0	0
Oman	6	3	4	2	0	1	0	0	0	0	0	0	0	0	0	0	0	0	0	0	0	0	0	0	0
Palestine	6	4	3	2	0	0	0	0	0	0	1	0	0	0	0	0	0	0	0	0	0	0	0	0	0
Panama	6	4	0	3	0	0	0	0	0	2	0	1	0	0	0	0	0	0	0	0	0	0	0	0	0
Paraguay	6	3	4	0	0	2	0	0	0	0	1	0	0	0	0	0	0	0	0	0	0	0	0	0	0
Peru	6	4	3	1	0	2	0	0	0	0	0	0	0	0	0	0	0	0	0	0	0	0	0	0	0
Poland	6	2	4	0	0	3	0	0	0	0	0	1	0	0	0	0	0	0	0	0	0	0	0	0	0
Portugal	3	2	1	0	0	4	0	0	6	0	0	0	0	0	0	0	0	0	0	0	0	0	0	0	0
Qatar	6	4	3	0	0	1	0	0	0	0	2	0	0	0	0	0	0	0	0	0	0	0	0	0	0
Romania	6	4	1	2	3	0	0	0	0	0	0	0	0	0	0	0	0	0	0	0	0	0	0	0	0
Russia	6	4	3	2	0	0	0	0	1	0	0	0	0	0	0	0	0	0	0	0	0	0	0	0	0
Saudi Arabia	6	4	1	0	0	3	0	0	2	0	0	0	0	0	0	0	0	0	0	0	0	0	0	0	0
Scotland	6	2	4	0	0	1	0	0	0	3	0	0	0	0	0	0	0	0	0	0	0	0	0	0	0
Senegal	3	6	4	2	0	0	0	0	0	0	0	0	0	0	1	0	0	0	0	0	0	0	0	0	0
Slovakia	4	6	2	3	1	0	0	0	0	0	0	0	0	0	0	0	0	0	0	0	0	0	0	0	0
Slovenia	6	2	4	3	0	0	0	1	0	0	0	0	0	0	0	0	0	0	0	0	0	0	0	0	0
South Africa	6	4	3	2	0	0	0	1	0	0	0	0	0	0	0	0	0	0	0	0	0	0	0	0	0
South Korea	6	4	3	2	0	0	0	0	0	0	0	0	0	0	0	0	0	0	0	0	0	1	0	0	0
Spain	6	3	4	0	1	2	0	0	0	0	0	0	0	0	0	0	0	0	0	0	0	0	0	0	0
Sweden	6	3	2	0	4	1	0	0	0	0	0	0	0	0	0	0	0	0	0	0	0	0	0	0	0
Switzerland	0	6	0	0	0	4	0	0	2	0	0	0	3	0	0	0	0	0	0	0	0	0	0	0	1
Tunisia	6	3	4	0	0	0	0	1	0	0	0	0	2	0	0	0	0	0	0	0	0	0	0	0	0
Turkey	6	3	1	0	0	0	0	0	0	0	0	2	0	0	0	0	4	0	0	0	0	0	0	0	0
Uganda	6	4	3	2	0	0	0	0	0	0	0	1	0	0	0	0	0	0	0	0	0	0	0	0	0
Ukraine	6	3	2	0	4	0	0	0	0	0	0	0	1	0	0	0	0	0	0	0	0	0	0	0	0
United Arab Emirates	6	4	3	0	0	0	0	1	0	0	0	2	0	0	0	0	0	0	0	0	0	0	0	0	0
Uruguay	6	3	4	0	0	1	0	0	0	0	0	0	0	0	2	0	0	0	0	0	0	0	0	0	0
United States	6	4	3	2	0	0	0	0	0	1	0	0	0	0	0	0	0	0	0	0	0	0	0	0	0
Venezuela	6	4	3	0	1	2	0	0	0	0	0	0	0	0	0	0	0	0	0	0	0	0	0	0	0
Vietnam	6	4	3	2	1	0	0	0	0	0	0	0	0	0	0	0	0	0	0	0	0	0	0	0	0
Wales	6	4	3	1	0	0	0	0	0	0	0	0	0	2	0	0	0	0	0	0	0	0	0	0	0
Zambia	6	4	3	0	0	0	0	2	0	0	1	0	0	0	0	0	0	0	0	0	0	0	0	0	0

== Ballon d'Or Féminin ==
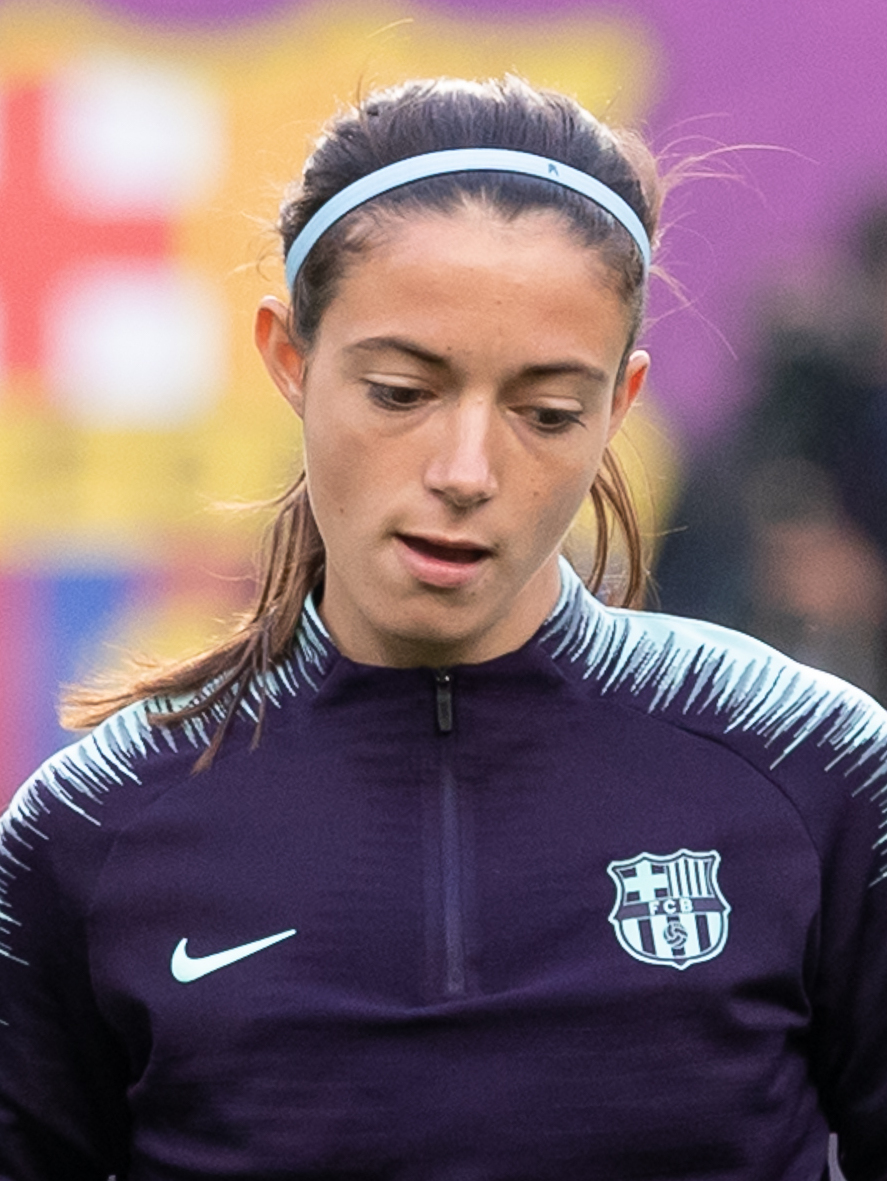
Barcelona's Aitana Bonmatí became the third Spanish player in a row to win the Ballon d'Or Féminin.

For players who appeared for multiple clubs during the season, only the most recent club is listed.

Thirty players were nominated for the 2023 Ballon d'Or Féminin.

2023 Ballon d'Or Féminin ranking
Rank	Player	Nationality	Position	Club	Points
1	Aitana Bonmatí	Spain	Midfielder	(Spain) Barcelona	266
2	Sam Kerr	Australia	Forward	(England) Chelsea	87
3	Salma Paralluelo	Spain	Forward	(Spain) Barcelona	49
4	Fridolina Rolfö	Sweden	Forward	(Spain) Barcelona	49
5	Mary Earps	England	Goalkeeper	(England) Manchester United	42
6	Olga Carmona	Spain	Defender	(Spain) Real Madrid	32
7	Alexandra Popp	Germany	Forward	(Germany) VfL Wolfsburg	27
8	Patricia Guijarro	Spain	Midfielder	(Spain) Barcelona	25
9	Linda Caicedo	Colombia	Forward	(Spain) Real Madrid	19
10	Rachel Daly	England	Forward	(England) Aston Villa	17
11	Millie Bright	England	Defender	(England) Chelsea	17
12	Hinata Miyazawa	Japan	Forward	(Japan) MyNavi Sendai	15
13	Lena Oberdorf	Germany	Midfielder	(Germany) VfL Wolfsburg	13
14	Kadidiatou Diani	France	Forward	(France) Paris Saint-Germain	12
15	Amanda Ilestedt	Sweden	Defender	(France) Paris Saint-Germain	12
16	Mapi León	Spain	Defender	(Spain) Barcelona	11
17	Hayley Raso	Australia	Forward	(England) Manchester City	8
18	Ewa Pajor	Poland	Forward	(Germany) VfL Wolfsburg	8
19	Guro Reiten	Norway	Midfielder	(England) Chelsea	8
20	Asisat Oshoala	Nigeria	Forward	(Spain) Barcelona	7
21	Alba Redondo	Spain	Forward	(Spain) Levante	7
22	Katie McCabe	Republic of Ireland	Defender	(England) Arsenal	6
23	Georgia Stanway	England	Midfielder	(Germany) Bayern Munich	6
24	Khadija Shaw	Jamaica	Forward	(England) Manchester City	5
25	Sophia Smith	United States	Forward	(United States) Portland Thorns	2
26	Wendie Renard	France	Defender	(France) Lyon	1
27	Yui Hasegawa	Japan	Midfielder	(England) Manchester City	1
28	Debinha	Brazil	Forward	(United States) Kansas City Current (Note: Debinha signed for Kansas City Current as a free agent after her contract with North Carolina Courage had expired.)	1
29	Jill Roord	Netherlands	Midfielder	(Germany) VfL Wolfsburg	0
29	Daphne van Domselaar	Netherlands	Goalkeeper	(England) Aston Villa	0

== Kopa Trophy ==
Club listed is the one which the player represented during the 2022–23 season. For players who appeared for multiple clubs during the season, only the most recent club is listed.

Ten players were nominated for the 2023 Kopa Trophy.

2023 Kopa Trophy ranking
Rank	Player	Nationality	Position	Club	Points
1	Jude Bellingham	England	Midfielder	(Germany) Borussia Dortmund (Note: Bellingham was signed by Real Madrid from Borussia Dortmund after the end of season.)	90
2	Jamal Musiala	Germany	Midfielder	(Germany) Bayern Munich	42
3	Pedri	Spain	Midfielder	(Spain) Barcelona	33
4	Eduardo Camavinga	France	Midfielder	(Spain) Real Madrid	29
5	Gavi	Spain	Midfielder	(Spain) Barcelona	20
6	Xavi Simons	Netherlands	Midfielder	(Netherlands) PSV (Note: Simons was signed by RB Leipzig from PSV after the end of season.)	4
7	Alejandro Balde	Spain	Defender	(Spain) Barcelona	4
8	António Silva	Portugal	Defender	(Portugal) Benfica	3
9	Rasmus Højlund	Denmark	Forward	(Italy) Atalanta (Note: Højlund was signed by Manchester United from Atalanta after the end of season.)	0
9	Elye Wahi	France	Forward	(France) Lens (Note: Wahi was signed by Lens from Montpellier during the season.)	0

== Yashin Trophy ==
Club listed is the one which the player represented during the 2022–23 season. For players who appeared for multiple clubs during the season, only the most recent club is listed.

Ten goalkeepers were nominated for the 2023 Yashin Trophy.

2023 Yashin Trophy ranking
Rank	Player	Nationality	Club	Points
1	Emiliano Martínez	Argentina	(England) Aston Villa	290
2	Ederson	Brazil	(England) Manchester City	197
3	Yassine Bounou	Morocco	(Spain) Sevilla (Note: Bounou was signed by Al-Hilal from Sevilla after the end of season.)	154
4	Thibaut Courtois	Belgium	(Spain) Real Madrid	81
5	Marc-André ter Stegen	Germany	(Spain) Barcelona	47
6	André Onana	Cameroon	(Italy) Inter Milan (Note: Onana was signed by Manchester United from Inter Milan after the end of season.)	44
7	Dominik Livaković	Croatia	(Croatia) Dinamo Zagreb	9
8	Aaron Ramsdale	England	(England) Arsenal	5
9	Mike Maignan	France	(Italy) AC Milan	1
10	Brice Samba	France	(France) Lens	0

== Gerd Müller Trophy ==
2023 Gerd Müller Trophy ranking
Rank	Player	Nationality	Position	Club	Goals
1	Erling Haaland	Norway	Forward	(England) Manchester City	56
2	Kylian Mbappé	France	Forward	(France) Paris Saint-Germain	54
3	Harry Kane	England	Forward	(England) Tottenham Hotspur	40
4	Lionel Messi	Argentina	Forward	(United States) Inter Miami (Note: Messi was signed by Inter Miami from Paris Saint-Germain during the season.)	38
5	Robert Lewandowski	Poland	Forward	(Spain) Barcelona	36

== Sócrates Award ==
2023 Sócrates Award winner
Player	Nationality	Position	Club
Vinícius Júnior	Brazil	Forward	(Spain) Real Madrid

== Men's Club of the Year ==
2023 Men's Club of the Year ranking
Rank	Club	Total	Ballon d'Or
1	(England) Manchester City	7	Julián Álvarez (ARG); Kevin De Bruyne (BEL); Rúben Dias (POR); İlkay Gündoğan (GER); Erling Haaland (NOR); Rodri (ESP); Bernardo Silva (POR)

== Women's Club of the Year ==
2023 Women's Club of the Year ranking
Rank	Club	Total	Ballon d'Or Féminin
1	(Spain) FC Barcelona	6	Aitana Bonmatí (ESP); Salma Paralluelo (ESP); Fridolina Rolfö (SWE); Patricia Guijarro (ESP); Mapi León (ESP); Asisat Oshoala (NGA)
