= 2021 Ballon d'Or =

Annual association football award event in France

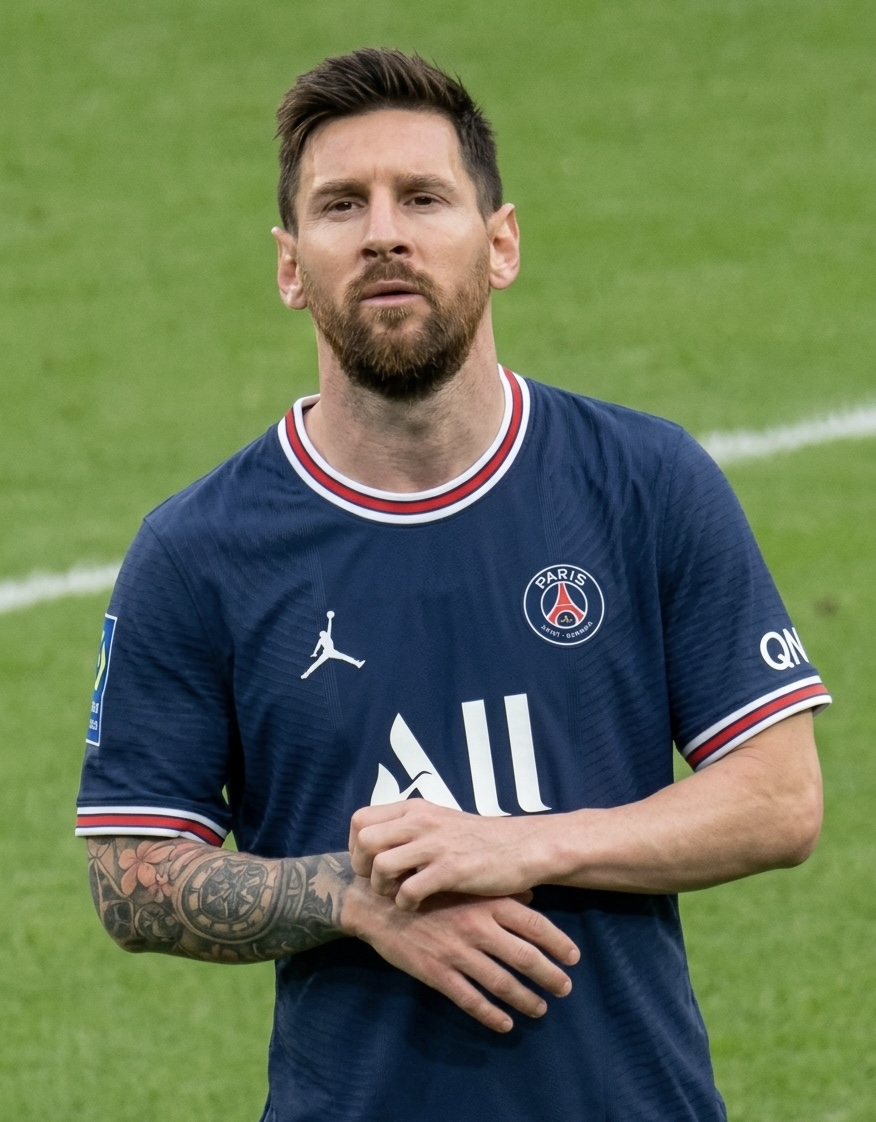
- 2021 Ballon d'Or winner, Lionel Messi
- Date: 29 November 2021
- Location: Théâtre du Châtelet, Paris
- Presented by: France Football
- Hosted by: Esteban Ocon; Fernando Alonso

Highlights
- Ballon d'Or: (Argentina) Lionel Messi (7th award)
- Ballon d'Or Féminin: (Spain) Alexia Putellas (1st award)
- Kopa Trophy: (Spain) Pedri (1st award)
- Yashin Trophy: (Italy) Gianluigi Donnarumma (1st award)
- Best Striker: (Poland) Robert Lewandowski (1st award)
- Website: ballondor.com

The 2021 Ballon d'Or (lit. '2021 Golden Ball'), was the 65th annual ceremony of the Ballon d'Or, presented by France Football, recognising the best footballers in the world in 2021.

The nominees for the ceremony were announced on 8 October 2021. Right before the ceremony, France Football announced that along with the Men's and Women's Ballon d'Or, Kopa Trophy and Yashin Trophy, two new awards would be given: the Best Club and Best Striker of the Year.

Lionel Messi won the award for a record-extending seventh time after captaining Argentina to the 2021 Copa America, its first senior international title since 1993. Robert Lewandowski finished second following his record-setting 41-goal season in the 2020–21 Bundesliga campaign, and Jorginho finished third after contributing to the 2020–21 UEFA Champions League and UEFA Euro 2020 titles.

== Ballon d'Or ==
The nominees for the awards were announced on 8 October 2021.

Rank	Player	Club(s)	Points
1	(Argentina) Lionel Messi	(France) Paris Saint-Germain (Note: Messi was signed by Paris Saint-Germain from Barcelona after the end of season.)	613
2	(Poland) Robert Lewandowski	(Germany) Bayern Munich	580
3	(Italy) Jorginho	(England) Chelsea	460
4	(France) Karim Benzema	(Spain) Real Madrid	239
5	(France) N'Golo Kanté	(England) Chelsea	186
6	(Portugal) Cristiano Ronaldo	(England) Manchester United (Note: Cristiano Ronaldo was signed by Manchester United from Juventus after the end of season.)	178
7	(Egypt) Mohamed Salah	(England) Liverpool	121
8	(Belgium) Kevin De Bruyne	(England) Manchester City	73
9	(France) Kylian Mbappé	(France) Paris Saint-Germain	58
10	(Italy) Gianluigi Donnarumma	(France) Paris Saint-Germain (Note: Donnarumma was signed by Paris Saint-Germain from Milan after the end of season.)	36
11	(Norway) Erling Haaland	(Germany) Borussia Dortmund	33
12	(Belgium) Romelu Lukaku	(England) Chelsea (Note: Lukaku was signed by Chelsea from Inter Milan after the end of season.)	26
12	(Italy) Giorgio Chiellini	(Italy) Juventus	26
14	(Italy) Leonardo Bonucci	(Italy) Juventus	18
15	(England) Raheem Sterling	(England) Manchester City	10
16	(Brazil) Neymar	(France) Paris Saint-Germain	9
17	(Uruguay) Luis Suárez	(Spain) Atlético Madrid	8
17	(Denmark) Simon Kjær	(Italy) Milan	8
19	(England) Mason Mount	(England) Chelsea	7
19	(Algeria) Riyad Mahrez	(England) Manchester City	7
21	(Portugal) Bruno Fernandes	(England) Manchester United	6
21	(Argentina) Lautaro Martínez	(Italy) Inter Milan	6
23	(England) Harry Kane	(England) Tottenham Hotspur	4
24	(Spain) Pedri	(Spain) Barcelona	3
25	(England) Phil Foden	(England) Manchester City	2
26	(Spain) Gerard Moreno	(Spain) Villarreal	1
26	(Italy) Nicolò Barella	(Italy) Inter Milan	1
26	(Portugal) Rúben Dias	(England) Manchester City	1
29	(Croatia) Luka Modrić	(Spain) Real Madrid	0
29	(Spain) Cesar Azpilicueta	(England) Chelsea	0

== Ballon d'Or Féminin ==
The shortlist for the awards were announced on 8 October 2021.

Rank	Player	Club(s)	Points
1	(Spain) Alexia Putellas	(Spain) Barcelona	186
2	(Spain) Jennifer Hermoso	(Spain) Barcelona	84
3	(Australia) Sam Kerr	(England) Chelsea	46
4	(Netherlands) Vivianne Miedema	(England) Arsenal	46
5	(Netherlands) Lieke Martens	(Spain) Barcelona	40
6	(Canada) Christine Sinclair	(United States) Portland Thorns	36
7	(Denmark) Pernille Harder	(England) Chelsea	33
8	(Canada) Ashley Lawrence	(France) Paris Saint-Germain	26
9	(Canada) Jessie Fleming	(England) Chelsea	25
10	(England) Fran Kirby	(England) Chelsea	22
11	(Sweden) Magdalena Eriksson	(England) Chelsea	20
12	(Chile) Christiane Endler	(France) Paris Saint-Germain (France) Lyon	19
13	(Sweden) Stina Blackstenius	(Sweden) BK Häcken	10
14	(United States) Sam Mewis	(England) Manchester City (United States) North Carolina Courage	8
15	(Spain) Irene Paredes	(France) Paris Saint-Germain (Spain) Barcelona	8
16	(England) Ellen White	(England) Manchester City	4
17	(France) Kadidiatou Diani	(France) Paris Saint-Germain	3
18	(France) Marie-Antoinette Katoto	(France) Paris Saint-Germain	3
19	(Spain) Sandra Paños	(Spain) Barcelona	3
20	(France) Wendie Renard	(France) Lyon	2

== Kopa Trophy ==
The nominees for the awards were announced on 8 October 2021.

Rank	Player	Club(s)	Points
1	(Spain) Pedri	(Spain) Barcelona	89
2	(England) Jude Bellingham	(Germany) Borussia Dortmund	39
3	(Germany) Jamal Musiala	(Germany) Bayern Munich	38
4	(Portugal) Nuno Mendes	(Portugal) Sporting CP (France) Paris Saint-Germain	23
5	(England) Mason Greenwood	(England) Manchester United	15
6	(England) Bukayo Saka	(England) Arsenal	8
7	(Germany) Florian Wirtz	(Germany) Bayer Leverkusen	8
8	(Netherlands) Ryan Gravenberch	(Netherlands) Ajax	3
9	(United States) Giovanni Reyna	(Germany) Borussia Dortmund	1
9	(Belgium) Jérémy Doku	(France) Rennes	1

== Yashin Trophy ==
The nominees for the awards were announced on 8 October 2021.

Rank	Player	Club(s)	Points
1	(Italy) Gianluigi Donnarumma	(Italy) Milan (France) Paris Saint-Germain	594
2	(Senegal) Édouard Mendy	(England) Chelsea	404
3	(Slovenia) Jan Oblak	(Spain) Atlético Madrid	155
4	(Brazil) Ederson	(England) Manchester City	93
5	(Germany) Manuel Neuer	(Germany) Bayern Munich	91
6	(Argentina) Emiliano Martínez	(England) Aston Villa	90
7	(Denmark) Kasper Schmeichel	(England) Leicester City	76
8	(Belgium) Thibaut Courtois	(Spain) Real Madrid	29
8	(Costa Rica) Keylor Navas	(France) Paris Saint-Germain	29
10	(Slovenia) Samir Handanović	(Italy) Inter Milan	8

== Striker of the Year ==
Rank	Player	Club(s)	Total goals
1	(Poland) Robert Lewandowski	(Germany) Bayern Munich	64

== Club of the Year ==
Rank	Club	Total players	Men	Women
1	(England) Chelsea	10	5	5
