= Bambali, Senegal =

Place in Sédhiou Region, Senegal

Bambali
- Town
- Location within Senegal
- Coordinates: 12°36′11″N 15°39′38″W
- Country: Senegal
- Region: Sédhiou
- Department: Sédhiou

Population (2018)
  - Total: 20,454
- Time zone: UTC±0 (Greenwich Mean Time)

Bambali is a town in Sédhiou Region, Senegal, located about 15 kilometres (9.3 mi) south-east of Sédhiou, on the banks of the Casamance River. In 2018, the population was 20,454.

== History ==
Sadio Mané, a footballer from the town, has helped by reinvesting and building new facilities such as a school in 2019. In March 2020, Mané donated £41,000 ($52,564; €46,083) to the national committee fighting COVID-19 in Senegal. In 2021, he donated £500,000 ($684,932; €561,987) towards the construction of a hospital. In addition, he has also financed the building of a petrol station and a post office for his local community, supplying the school with free laptops and internet from the 4G internet service he financed in the village. In total, he has spent more than £700,000 ($958,904; €786,782) on these upgrades. In addition, he commissioned a €70-a-month stipend to each family in his 2,000-person hometown. This is roughly equivalent to a month's wage for a Senegalese citizen on a minimum wage.

== Notable people ==
Bambali is the hometown of Senegalese footballer Sadio Mané.
