= France Football =

French weekly association football magazine

- Issue cover dated 29 November 2005, featuring Ronaldinho and the 2005 Ballon d'Or
- Editor: Vincent Garcia
- Categories: Sports magazine
- Frequency: Monthly (2021–present)
- Publisher: Groupe Amaury
- Founded: 1946; 80 years ago
- Country: France
- Based in: Paris
- Language: French
- Website: francefootball.fr
- ISSN: 0015-9557

France Football is a French monthly magazine containing football news from all over the world. It is considered to be one of the most reputable sports publications in Europe, mostly because of its photographic reports, in-depth and exclusive interviews and accurate statistics of the UEFA Champions League matches, and extensive coverage of the European leagues. The magazine was first published in 1946 and is headquartered in Paris. For more than six decades it has presented the Ballon d'Or award to the best football player of the year, which mostly take place in the October time window.

== Awards ==
Since 1956, France Football presents the Ballon d'Or (lit. '"Golden Ball"'), initially referred to as the "European Footballer of the Year" award. Following the award's merger with the FIFA World Player of the Year award in 2010, the magazine awarded the FIFA Ballon d'Or to the world's best player in partnership with FIFA, the sport's governing body, until 2016, when it resumed full ownership of the trophy. Since 1959, France Football also elects the French Player of the Year and awarded the best club team in Europe since 1968 to 1990.

Awards presented by France Football
Annual awards:
- Ballon d'Or
- Ballon d'Or Féminin
- Kopa Trophy
- Yashin Trophy
- Gerd Müller Trophy
- Sócrates Award
- Club of the Year
- Johan Cruyff Trophy
- French Player of the Year

Selected awards:

- Ballon d'Or Dream Team (2020)
- Super Ballon d'Or (1989)

== History ==
France Football originated from the magazine Football, which was published from 1927 to 1944 and was for a time the semi-official print organ of the FFF. Initially, FF was published on plain newsprint and only in black and white; Since February 1977 (introduction of the color front page), the magazine has increasingly become an illustrated magazine with numerous large-format color photographs. Its circulation increased in parallel from 120,000 (1975) to 213,000 copies (2004).

From 1974 to 1982 and from 1997 to 2013 there were two weekly issues (Tuesdays and Fridays), with the Friday issue from 1978 to 1982 being called France Foot 2, and since April 2013 only the Tuesday issue has been produced. In Issue No. 3587 of January 21, 2015, the publication date was changed to Wednesday.

== Ballon d'Or Dream Team ==
In 2020, instead of the traditional awarding of the Ballon d'Or, cancelled due to the COVID-19 pandemic, the magazine organized a vote among 177 journalists from the world's leading media outlets (140 of them foreign) to determine a "dream team" - a symbolic team made up of the best players in football history. In December, France Football published three "dream teams" at once, ranked as first, second and third depending on the vote results.

== See also ==
- L'Équipe
- Onze Mondial
- World Soccer
