= Johan Cruyff Trophy (France Football) =

Annual association football award presented by France Football

- Awarded for: Best men's football coach of the season
- Country: France
- Presented by: France Football
- First award: 2024
- Currently held by: (Spain) Luis de la Fuente

Highlights
- Most awards: (Spain) Luis Enrique (Italy) Carlo Ancelotti (Spain) Luis de la Fuente (1 each)

The Johan Cruyff Trophy (French: Trophée Johan Cruyff) or Coach of the Year is an annual association football award presented by France Football since 2024. It honours the best men's and women's football coaches of the previous season.

The award is named after Johan Cruyff, three-time Ballon d'Or winner (1971, 1973, 1974) and former manager of AFC Ajax and FC Barcelona, who died in 2016.

== Criteria ==
The trophy is awarded to the best men's and women's football coaches of the previous season.

== Winners (men's) ==
Year	Position	Coach	Team	Points
2024	1st	(Italy) Carlo Ancelotti	(Spain) Real Madrid	118
2024	2nd	(Spain) Xabi Alonso	(Germany) Bayer Leverkusen	89
2024	3rd	(Spain) Luis de la Fuente	Spain national football team	63
2025	1st	(Spain) Luis Enrique	(France) Paris Saint-Germain	118
2025	2nd	(Germany) Hansi Flick	(Spain) Barcelona	44
2025	3rd	(Italy) Enzo Maresca	(England) Chelsea	27
2026	1st	(Spain) Luis de la Fuente	Spain national football team	167
2026	2nd	(Spain) Luis Enrique	(France) Paris Saint-Germain	117
2026	3rd	(Spain) Mikel Arteta	(England) Arsenal	15

=== Statistics ===
==== By nationality ====
Nation	Coaches	Total
Spain	2	2
Italy	1	1

==== By club ====
Club	Coaches	Total
(Spain) Real Madrid	1	1
(France) Paris Saint-Germain	1	1
Spain national football team	1	1

== Winners (women's) ==
Johan Cruyff Trophy
- Awarded for: Best women's football coach of the season
- Country: France
- Presented by: France Football
- First award: 2024
- Currently held by: (Spain) Pere Romeu

Highlights
- Most awards: (Netherlands) Sarina Wiegman (England) Emma Hayes (Spain) Pere Romeu (1 each)

Year	Position	Coach	Team	Points
2024	1st	(England) Emma Hayes	(England) Chelsea / United States women's team	72
2024	2nd	(Spain) Jonatan Giráldez	(Spain) Barcelona	49
2024	3rd	(Brazil) Arthur Elias	Corinthians / Brazil women's team	14
2025	1st	(Netherlands) Sarina Wiegman	England women's team	84
2025	2nd	(Netherlands) Renée Slegers	(England) Arsenal	46
2025	3rd	(France) Sonia Bompastor	(England) Chelsea	15
2026	1st	(Spain) Pere Romeu	(Spain) Barcelona	84
2026	2nd	(Spain) Jonatan Giráldez	(France) OL Lyonnes	26
2026	3rd	(Sweden) Andrée Jeglertz	(England) Manchester City	22

=== Statistics ===
==== By nationality ====
Nation	Coaches	Total
England	1	1
Netherlands	1	1
Spain	1	1

==== By team ====
Team	Coaches	Total
(England) Chelsea	1	1
England women's national football team	1	1
(Spain) Barcelona	1	1

== See also ==
- The Best FIFA Football Coach
