= Kopa Trophy =

Annual association football award presented by France Football

- Trophée Kopa
- Lamine Yamal, the current award holder
- Awarded for: The best performing footballer worldwide under the age of 21.
- Location: Paris, France
- Presented by: France Football
- First award: 3 December 2018; 7 years ago
- Current holder: (Spain) Lamine Yamal (3rd award)

Highlights
- Most awards: (Spain) Lamine Yamal (3 awards)
- Most nominations: (Germany) Jamal Musiala (Spain) Lamine Yamal (3 nominations each)
- Website: francefootball.fr
- Related: Ballon d'Or

The Kopa Trophy or Young Talent of the Year is an association football award presented by French newspaper France Football that is given to the best young performing player in the world under the age of 21, during a joint ceremony with their senior Ballon d'Or award. The award is named after late French footballer Raymond Kopa, the winner of the 1958 Ballon d'Or. The winner is selected by a jury of all former Ballon d'Or winners and is open to all young players worldwide throughout the six FIFA confederations.

Kylian Mbappé became the award's first recipient during the 2018 Ballon d'Or presentation. As of 2026, Lamine Yamal has won the most awards with 3, including the latest edition, and shares the most nominations with Jamal Musiala, with 3 nominations. In 2025, the award was expanded with the Women's Kopa Trophy for female youth players.

== Men's winners ==
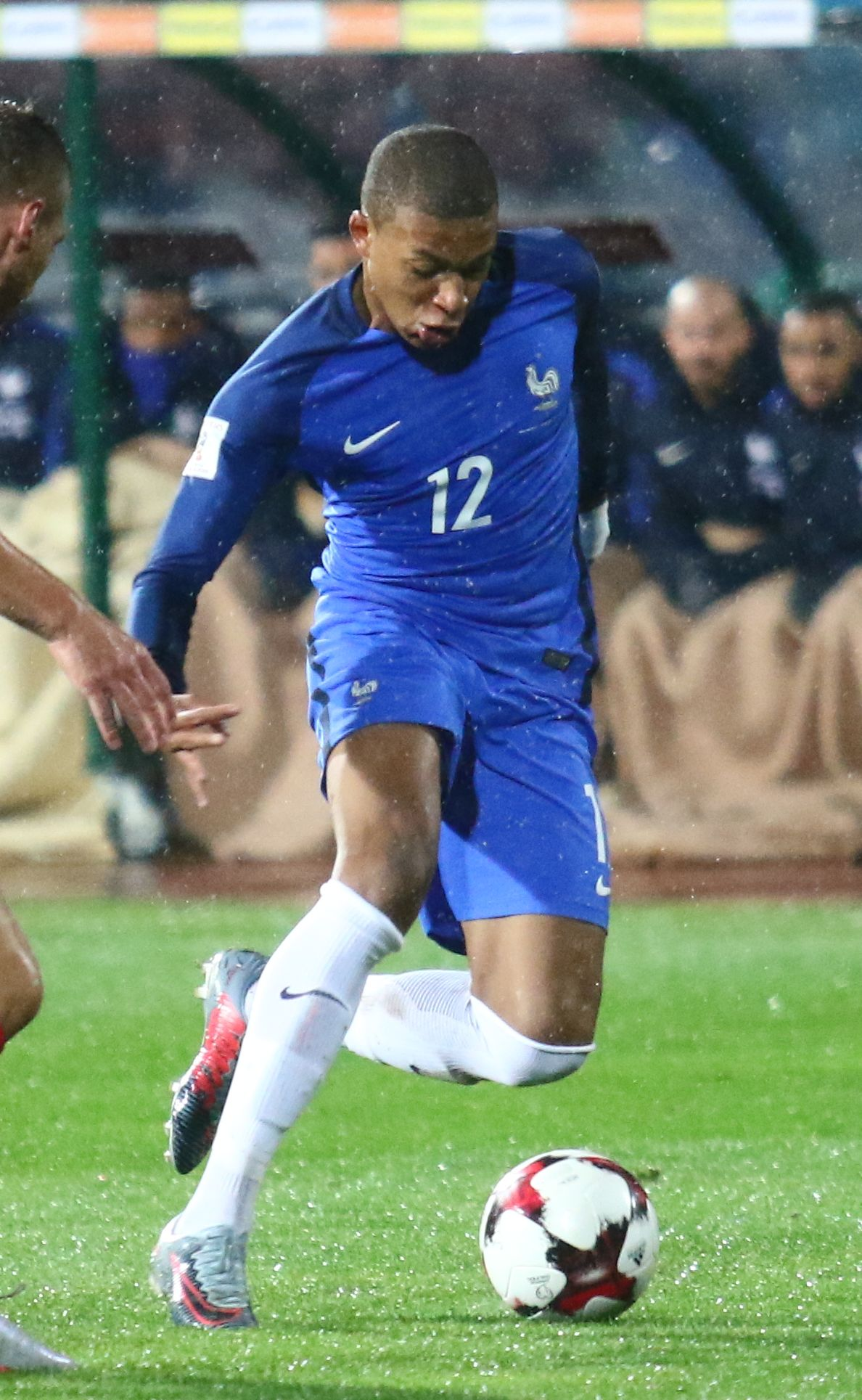
Kylian Mbappé, the inaugural award winner

Player (X)	Denotes the number of times the player had won the award at that time (for players with multiple wins)

Year	Rank	Player	Club	Points
2018	1st	(France) Kylian Mbappé	(France) Paris Saint-Germain	110
2018	2nd	(United States) Christian Pulisic	(Germany) Borussia Dortmund	31
2018	3rd	(Netherlands) Justin Kluivert	(Italy) Roma (Note: Kluivert was signed by Roma from Ajax midway through 2018)	18
2019	1st	(Netherlands) Matthijs de Ligt	(Italy) Juventus (Note: de Ligt was signed by Juventus from Ajax midway through 2019)	58
2019	2nd	(England) Jadon Sancho	(Germany) Borussia Dortmund	49
2019	3rd	(Portugal) João Félix	(Spain) Atlético Madrid (Note: Félix was signed by Atlético Madrid from Benfica midway through 2019)	41
2020	Not awarded due to the COVID-19 pandemic			
2021	1st	(Spain) Pedri	(Spain) Barcelona	89
2021	2nd	(England) Jude Bellingham	(Germany) Borussia Dortmund	39
2021	3rd	(Germany) Jamal Musiala	(Germany) Bayern Munich	38
2022	1st	(Spain) Gavi	(Spain) Barcelona	59
2022	2nd	(France) Eduardo Camavinga	(Spain) Real Madrid (Note: Camavinga was signed by Real Madrid from Rennes midway through 2022)	51
2022	3rd	(Germany) Jamal Musiala	(Germany) Bayern Munich	47
2023	1st	(England) Jude Bellingham	(Germany) Borussia Dortmund (Note: Although Bellingham was signed by Real Madrid from Borussia Dortmund during the award period, he did not make his debut until after the award period ended)	90
2023	2nd	(Germany) Jamal Musiala	(Germany) Bayern Munich	42
2023	3rd	(Spain) Pedri	(Spain) Barcelona	33
2024	1st	(Spain) Lamine Yamal (1)	(Spain) Barcelona	113
2024	2nd	(Turkey) Arda Güler	(Spain) Real Madrid	26
2024	3rd	(England) Kobbie Mainoo	(England) Manchester United	20
2025	1st	(Spain) Lamine Yamal (2)	(Spain) Barcelona	124
2025	2nd	(France) Désiré Doué	(France) Paris Saint-Germain	72
2025	3rd	(Portugal) João Neves	(France) Paris Saint-Germain	23
2026	1st	(Spain) Lamine Yamal (3)	(Spain) Barcelona	96
2026	2nd	(Spain) Pau Cubarsí	(Spain) Barcelona	94
2026	3rd	(France) Warren Zaïre-Emery	(France) Paris Saint-Germain	20

=== Wins by player ===
Player	Winner	Second place	Third place
(Spain) Lamine Yamal	3 (2024, 2025, 2026)	–	–
(England) Jude Bellingham	1 (2023)	1 (2021)	–
(Spain) Pedri	1 (2021)	–	1 (2023)
(France) Kylian Mbappé	1 (2018)	–	–
(Netherlands) Matthijs de Ligt	1 (2019)	–	–
(Spain) Gavi	1 (2022)	–	–
(Germany) Jamal Musiala	–	1 (2023)	2 (2021, 2022)
(United States) Christian Pulisic	–	1 (2018)	–
(England) Jadon Sancho	–	1 (2019)	–
(France) Eduardo Camavinga	–	1 (2022)	–
(Turkey) Arda Güler	–	1 (2024)	–
(France) Désiré Doué	–	1 (2025)	–
(Spain) Pau Cubarsí	–	1 (2026)	–
(Netherlands) Justin Kluivert	–	–	1 (2018)
(Portugal) João Félix	–	–	1 (2019)
(England) Kobbie Mainoo	–	–	1 (2024)
(Portugal) João Neves	–	–	1 (2025)
(France) Warren Zaïre-Emery	–	–	1 (2026)

=== Wins by country ===
Country	Players	Wins
Spain	3	5
England	1	1
France	1	1
Netherlands	1	1

=== Wins by club ===
Club	Players	Wins
(Spain) Barcelona	3	5
(Germany) Borussia Dortmund	1	1
(Italy) Juventus	1	1
(France) Paris Saint-Germain	1	1

== Women's winners ==
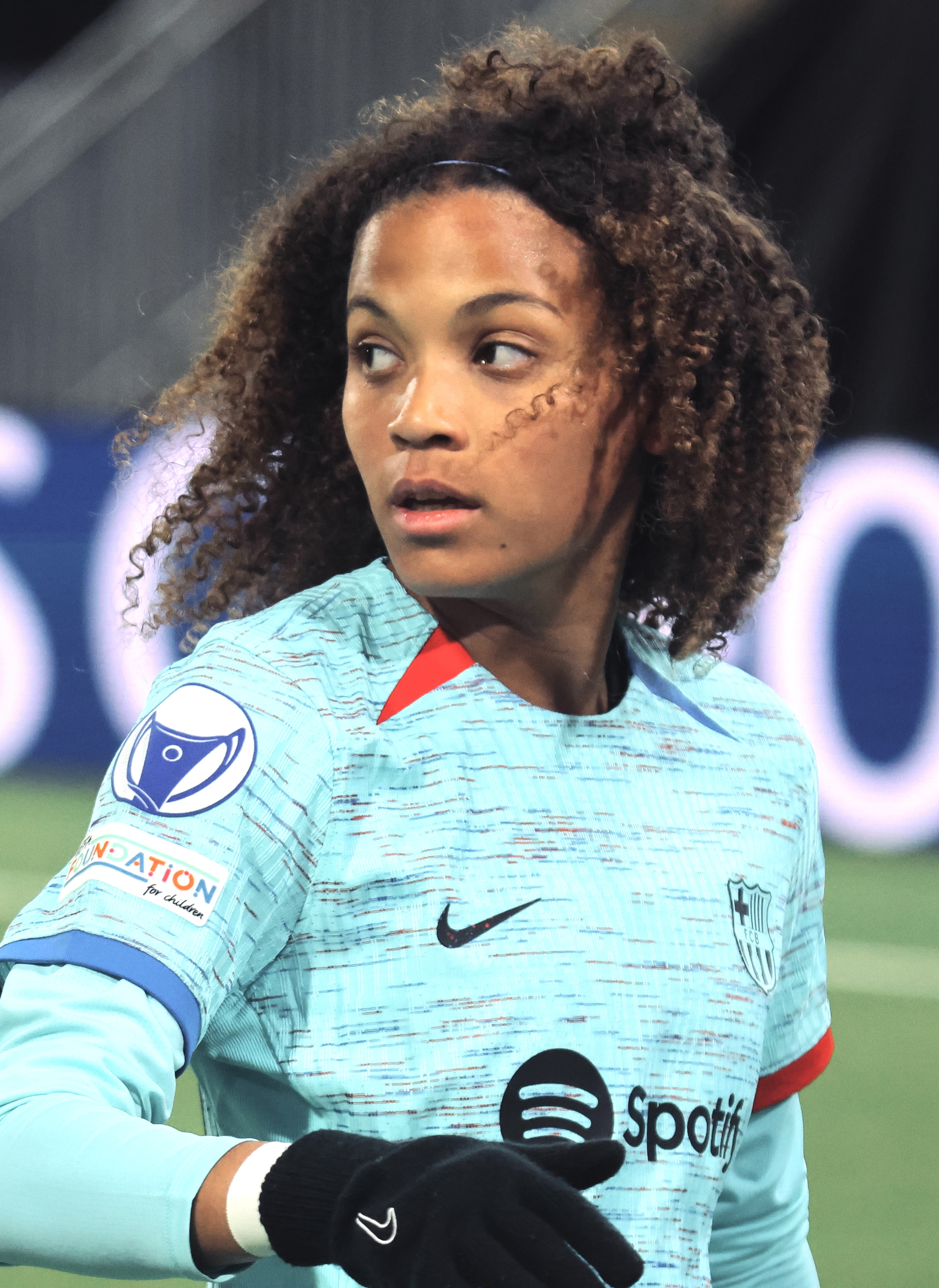
Vicky López, the women's inaugural award winner

Player (X)	Denotes the number of times the player had won the award at that time (for players with multiple wins)

Year	Rank	Player	Club	Points
2025	1st	(Spain) Vicky López	(Spain) Barcelona	15
2025	2nd	(Colombia) Linda Caicedo	(Spain) Real Madrid	12
2025	3rd	(Netherlands) Wieke Kaptein	(England) Chelsea	8
2026	1st	(Spain) Vicky López (2)	(Spain) Barcelona	21
2026	2nd	(Spain) Clara Serrajordi	(Spain) Barcelona	11
2026	3rd	(Netherlands) Veerle Buurman	(England) Chelsea	7

=== Wins by player ===
Player	Winner	Second place	Third place
(Spain) Vicky López	2 (2025), (2026)	–	–
(Colombia) Linda Caicedo	–	1 (2025)	–
(Spain) Clara Serrajordi	–	1 (2026)	–
(Netherlands) Wieke Kaptein	–	–	1 (2025)
(Netherlands) Veerle Buurman	–	–	1 (2026)

=== Wins by country ===
Country	Players	Wins
Spain	1	2

=== Wins by club ===
Club	Players	Wins
(Spain) Barcelona	1	2

== See also ==
- Bravo Award
- Golden Boy (award)
- Golden Girl (award)
