= Pere Romeu =

Spanish football coach

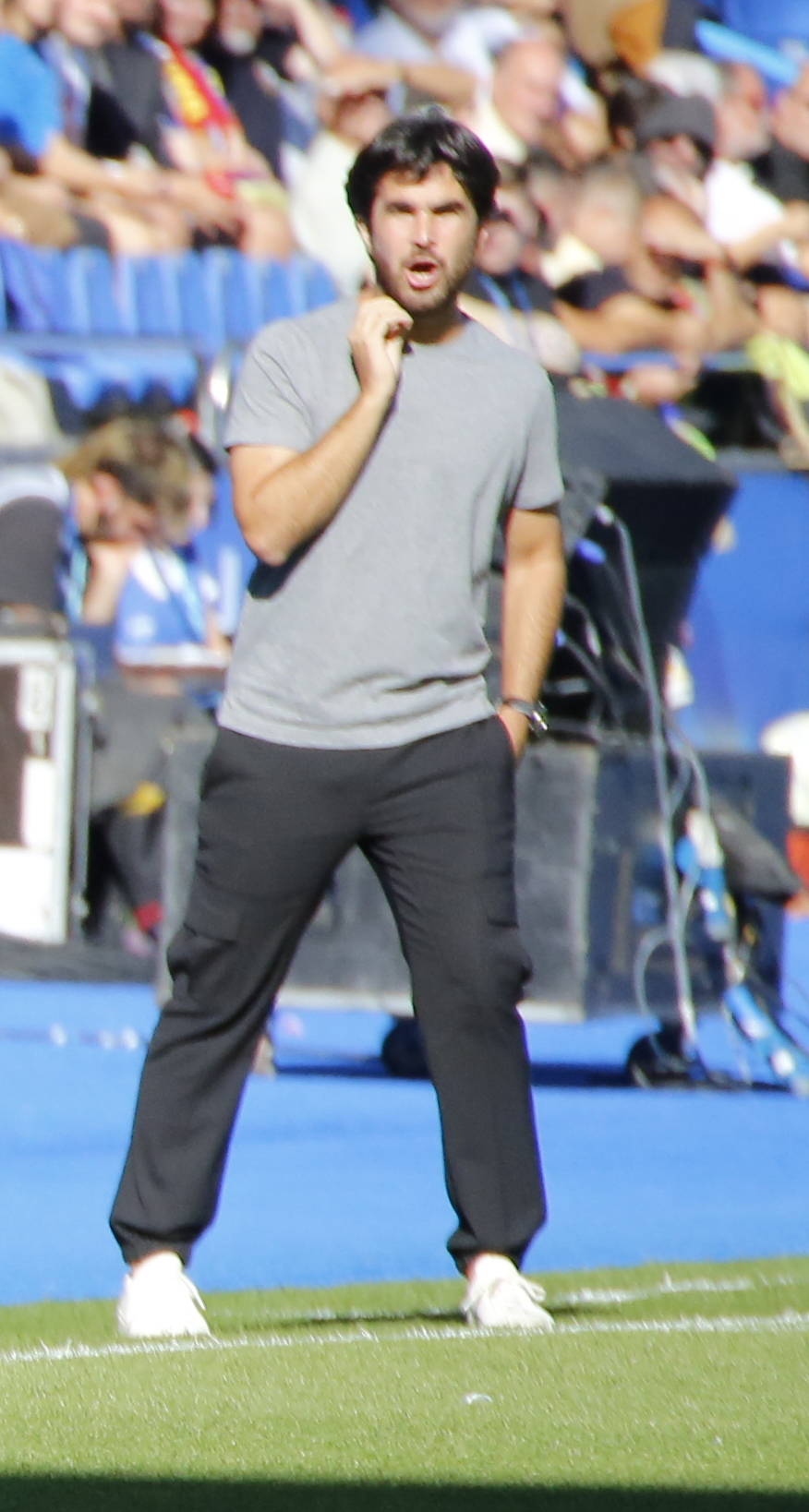
- Romeu with Barcelona Femení in 2024

Personal information
- Full name: Pere Romeu Sunyer
- Date of birth: 9 November 1993 (age 32)
- Place of birth: Barcelona, Catalonia, Spain
- Position: Defensive midfielder

Team information
- Current team: Barcelona Femení (head coach)

Youth career
- Europa
- Sarrià

Senior career*
Years	Team	Apps	(Gls)
- Sarrià B
- Sarrià

Managerial career
- Sarrià U10
- L'Hospitalet U15
- L'Hospitalet U16
- 2024–: Barcelona Femení
- * Club domestic league appearances and goals

Pere Romeu Sunyer (born 9 November 1993) is a Spanish professional football manager and former player who is the current head coach of Liga F team Barcelona Femení. He has previously coached at La Masia.

== Early life ==
Pere Romeu Sunyer was born in 1993 in Barcelona. He has a variety of artistic interests, including music, film and architecture – his father is an architect, his mother a landscape architect, and his brother works in film. Romeu "started to become aware of football" when FC Barcelona was experiencing its best period in the 2000s, and considers Pep Guardiola his managerial idol.

== Football career ==
In his playing career, Romeu was a defensive midfielder who spent two years in the youth sections of CE Europa, up to under-16 level, before joining amateur club CP Sarrià. He played at Sarrià in the under-17s before moving up. In his second year in the under-18 team, he suffered an anterior cruciate ligament injury. The injury kept him from playing for the rest of the season, and half of the next season; he stayed around the team and made suggestions to the coaching staff before returning to play at the end of the season and helping the team to win their league and gain promotion, and playing some games with the first team.

His football idol was always Deco. In 2024 his former Sarrià coach compared his playing style to that of Keira Walsh, describing Romeu as a pivot with good vision but who rarely advanced, even becoming "more aggressive defensively" as he progressed.

== Managerial career ==
=== Early clubs ===
Romeu began his coaching career in the youth sections of his club, CP Sarrià. Having offered coaching suggestions while out with injury, and being good with children, the club directors asked him to coach the under-10 (benjamín) youth level. He then moved to coach at L'Hospitalet, taking on both the under-15 and under-16 sections together. As L'Hospitalet competed at a higher level, its youth ranks were more demanding. Romeu travelled around Spain to meet other coaches and learn new methods.

=== La Masia ===
Barcelona coaching staff noticed Romeu at L'Hospitalet and were impressed with his vision of the game. In 2017, he joined Barcelona's La Masia, initially working with the benjamín squad. After a season, his dedication saw him named the assistant to Sergi Milà in coaching the 2004 generation – including Gavi, Ángel Alarcón, Ilias Akhomach and Aleix Garrido – in their successive sections for the next two years.

=== Viitorul Constanța ===
Romeu stepped up to coaching senior football in 2020, as an assistant to Rubén de la Barrera at Romanian top-flight club Viitorul Constanța, after Gheorghe Hagi left the head coach position – between Hagi and president Gheorghe Popescu, the team had Barcelona connections, and was committed to developing young players, which Romeu found rewarding.

During the 2020–21 season, Romeu was assistant for 12 games before Viitorul sacked its entire coaching staff in November 2020 and merged with the other Constanța team, second-division FC Farul Constanța. The new entity continued playing at Viitorul's stadium but the rest of Viitorul was effectively replaced by Farul, with Hagi becoming owner and coach.

=== Barcelona Femení ===
He returned to Barcelona when Jonatan Giráldez became head coach of Barcelona Femení in 2021, as one of Giráldez' assistants along with Rafel Navarro. Romeu worked in analytics and game preparations, with the club considering him important to the dominance they experienced under Giráldez, winning ten of the twelve available trophies.

As assistants, Romeu and Navarro were considered equal, and were both considered to take over as head coach when Giráldez left the club in 2024. Romeu, noted for a strength in analytics and his strong relationships with players, was selected; he was reported to have been internally chosen in February 2024, and took over after the conclusion of the perfect 2023–24 season in June. Romeu's appointment was the third successive time Barcelona Femení promoted one of their assistants to be head coach (following Lluís Cortés and Giráldez); the team's success since beginning this pattern in 2019 prompted faith in continuity.

He has won the " coach of the year " award in 2026 for his incredible managerial skills at Barça Femení, awarded by France Football.

== Managerial statistics ==
As of matches played 23 July 2026

Managerial record by team and tenure
Team	From	To	Record								Ref
Team	From	To	G	W	D	L	GF	GA	GD	Win %	Ref
Barcelona	1 July 2024	present	99	91	3	5	399	49	+350	91.92	
Career totals			99	91	3	5	399	49	+350	91.92	

== Honours ==
=== Manager ===
Barcelona Femení

- Liga F: 2024–25, 2025–26
- Copa de la Reina: 2024–25, 2025–26
- Supercopa de España: 2024–25, 2025–26
- UEFA Women's Champions League: 2025–26;

=== Individual ===
- Johan Cruyff Trophy: 2026
