= 2018 Ballon d'Or =

Annual association football award event in France

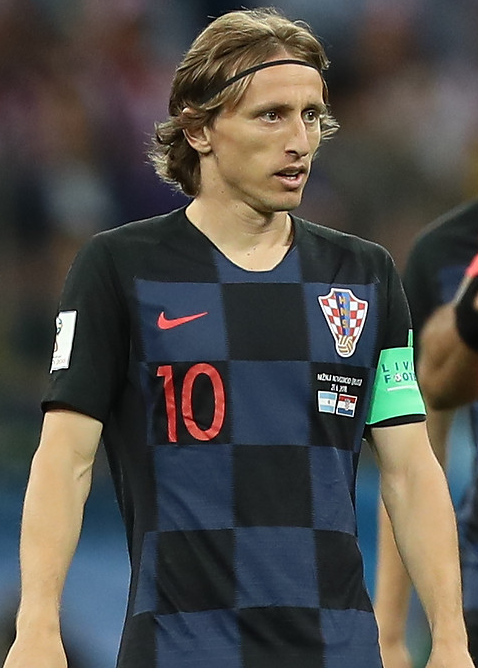
- 2018 Ballon d'Or winner, Luka Modrić
- Date: 3 December 2018
- Location: Paris, France
- Country: France
- Presented by: France Football

Highlights
- Ballon d'Or: (Croatia) Luka Modrić (1st award)
- Ballon d'Or Féminin: (Norway) Ada Hegerberg (1st award)
- Kopa Trophy: (France) Kylian Mbappé (1st award)
- Website: ballondor.com

The 2018 Ballon d'Or (lit. '2018 Golden Ball'), was the 63rd annual award ceremony recognising the best footballer in the world for 2018. The winners were announced on 3 December 2018, and for the first time in its history, the Ballon d'Or Féminin and Kopa Trophy were awarded to the best female footballer and male under-21 footballer, respectively. Luka Modrić, who was integral to Real Madrid's Champions League victory and Croatia's surprise journey to the 2018 FIFA World Cup final, was awarded the Ballon d'Or. His win meant that it was the first time since Kaká in 2007 that a player other than Lionel Messi and Cristiano Ronaldo won the award, ending the 10-year Messi–Ronaldo dominance.

== Ballon d'Or ==
The nominees for the awards were announced on 8 October 2018.

Rank	Player	Club(s)	Points
1	(Croatia) Luka Modrić	(Spain) Real Madrid	753
2	(Portugal) Cristiano Ronaldo	(Spain) Real Madrid (Italy) Juventus	476
3	(France) Antoine Griezmann	(Spain) Atlético Madrid	414
4	(France) Kylian Mbappé	(France) Paris Saint-Germain	347
5	(Argentina) Lionel Messi	(Spain) Barcelona	280
6	(Egypt) Mohamed Salah	(England) Liverpool	188
7	(France) Raphaël Varane	(Spain) Real Madrid	121
8	(Belgium) Eden Hazard	(England) Chelsea	119
9	(Belgium) Kevin De Bruyne	(England) Manchester City	29
10	(England) Harry Kane	(England) Tottenham Hotspur	25
11	(France) N'Golo Kanté	(England) Chelsea	24
12	(Brazil) Neymar	(France) Paris Saint-Germain	19
13	(Uruguay) Luis Suárez	(Spain) Barcelona	17
14	(Belgium) Thibaut Courtois	(England) Chelsea (Spain) Real Madrid	12
15	(France) Paul Pogba	(England) Manchester United	9
16	(Argentina) Sergio Agüero	(England) Manchester City	7
17	(Wales) Gareth Bale	(Spain) Real Madrid	6
17	(France) Karim Benzema	(Spain) Real Madrid	6
19	(Brazil) Roberto Firmino	(England) Liverpool	4
19	(Croatia) Ivan Rakitić	(Spain) Barcelona	4
19	(Spain) Sergio Ramos	(Spain) Real Madrid	4
22	(Uruguay) Edinson Cavani	(France) Paris Saint-Germain	3
22	(Senegal) Sadio Mané	(England) Liverpool	3
22	(Brazil) Marcelo	(Spain) Real Madrid	3
25	(Brazil) Alisson	(Italy) Roma (England) Liverpool	2
25	(Croatia) Mario Mandžukić	(Italy) Juventus	2
25	(Slovenia) Jan Oblak	(Spain) Atlético Madrid	2
28	(Uruguay) Diego Godín	(Spain) Atlético Madrid	1
29	(Spain) Isco	(Spain) Real Madrid	0
29	(France) Hugo Lloris	(England) Tottenham Hotspur	0

== Ballon d'Or Féminin ==
Rank	Player	Club(s)	Points
1	(Norway) Ada Hegerberg	(France) Lyon	136
2	(Denmark) Pernille Harder	(Germany) VfL Wolfsburg	130
3	(Germany) Dzsenifer Marozsán	(France) Lyon	86
4	(Brazil) Marta	(United States) Orlando Pride	77
5	(Australia) Sam Kerr	(United States) Chicago Red Stars (Australia) Perth Glory	61
6	(England) Lucy Bronze	(France) Lyon	51
7	(France) Amandine Henry	(France) Lyon	34
7	(France) Wendie Renard	(France) Lyon	34
9	(United States) Megan Rapinoe	(United States) Seattle Reign	30
10	(United States) Lindsey Horan	(United States) Portland Thorns	28
11	(Netherlands) Lieke Martens	(Spain) Barcelona	26
12	(Japan) Saki Kumagai	(France) Lyon	25
13	(France) Amel Majri	(France) Lyon	9
14	(England) Fran Kirby	(England) Chelsea	5
15	(Canada) Christine Sinclair	(United States) Portland Thorns	4

== Kopa Trophy ==
Rank	Player	Club(s)	Points
1	(France) Kylian Mbappé	(France) Paris Saint-Germain	110
2	(United States) Christian Pulisic	(Germany) Borussia Dortmund	31
3	(Netherlands) Justin Kluivert	(Netherlands) Ajax (Italy) Roma	18
4	(Brazil) Rodrygo	(Brazil) Santos	12
4	(Italy) Gianluigi Donnarumma	(Italy) Milan	12
6	(England) Trent Alexander-Arnold	(England) Liverpool	6
7	(Italy) Patrick Cutrone	(Italy) Milan	5
8	(Algeria) Houssem Aouar	(France) Lyon	4
9	(Japan) Ritsu Doan	(Netherlands) Groningen	0
9	(Mali) Amadou Haidara	(Austria) Red Bull Salzburg	0
