= 2026 Ballon d'Or =

Annual association football award in England

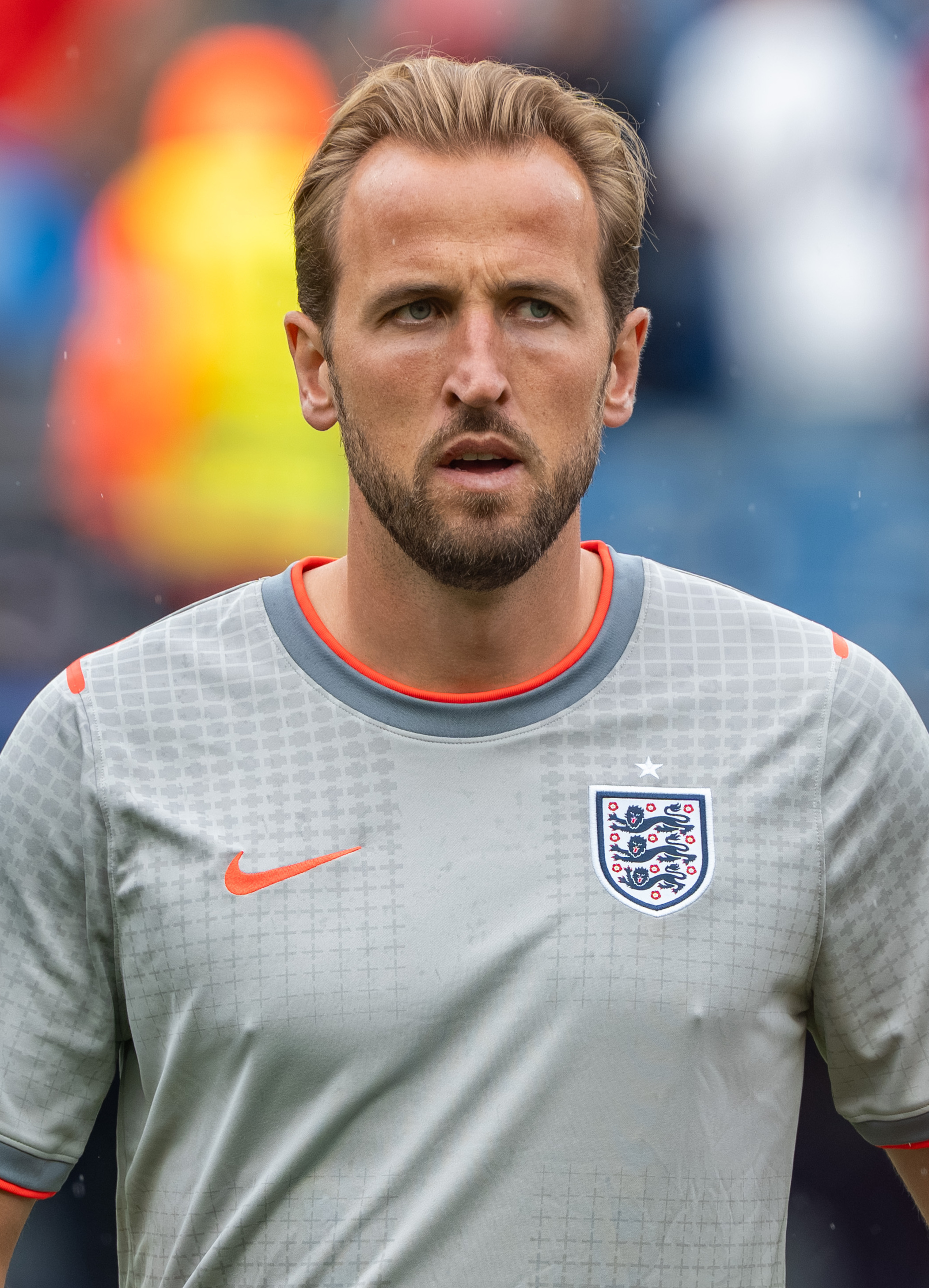
- 2026 Ballon d'Or winner, Harry Kane
- Date: 26 October 2026
- Location: London Palladium, London
- Presented by: France Football
- Hosted by: Kate Scott; Thierry Henry

Highlights
- Ballon d'Or: (England) Harry Kane (1st award)
- Ballon d'Or Féminin: (Spain) Alexia Putellas (3rd award)
- Kopa Trophy: Men's: (Spain) Lamine Yamal (3rd award); Women's: (Spain) Vicky López (2nd award)
- Yashin Trophy: Men's: (Spain) Unai Simón (1st award); Women's: (Spain) Cata Coll (1st award)
- Gerd Müller Trophy: Men's: (England) Harry Kane (2nd award); Women's: (Mexico) Charlyn Corral (1st award)
- Website: ballondor.com

The 2026 Ballon d'Or (lit. '2026 Golden Ball') was the 70th annual ceremony of the Ballon d'Or, presented by France Football, recognising the best footballers in the world in the 2025–26 season. For the fifth time in the history of the award, it was given based on the results of the season instead of the calendar year. This is the period from 3 August 2025 to 19 July 2026. The ceremony took place on 26 October 2026 at the London Palladium in London. This also marked the first time the ceremony was organised outside France or Switzerland.

Bayern Munich forward Harry Kane won the Men's Ballon d'Or, receiving the award for the first time in his career. He finished ahead of Kylian Mbappé and Lamine Yamal in the voting after scoring 73 goals for club and country during the 2025–26 season. Kane helped Bayern win the Bundesliga and reach the semi-finals of the UEFA Champions League, while also captaining England to third place at the 2026 FIFA World Cup. He became the fifth Englishman to win the award, with the latest before him being Michael Owen in 2001. Kane is the 4th Bayern Munich player to achieve this honour.

Barcelona midfielder Alexia Putellas won the women's Ballon d'Or, receiving the award for the third time in her career after helping the club win a quadruple. She finished ahead of Ewa Pajor and Khadija Shaw in the voting. Her win was the sixth consecutive year a player from Spain won the award, joining Aitana Bonmatí as the only players to win the award three times.

== Ballon d'Or ==
Club listed is the one which the player represented during the 2025–26 season.

Thirty players were nominated for the 2026 Men's Ballon d'Or.

2026 Men's Ballon d'Or
Rank	Player	Nationality	Position	Club	Points
1	Harry Kane	England	Forward	(Germany) Bayern Munich	1055
2	Kylian Mbappé	France	Forward	(Spain) Real Madrid	1027
3	Lamine Yamal	Spain	Forward	(Spain) Barcelona	881
4	Rodri	Spain	Midfielder	(England) Manchester City	726
5	Lionel Messi	Argentina	Forward	(United States) Inter Miami	612
6	Khvicha Kvaratskhelia	Georgia	Forward	(France) Paris Saint-Germain	541
7	Ousmane Dembélé	France	Forward	(France) Paris Saint-Germain	418
8	Erling Haaland	Norway	Forward	(England) Manchester City	378
9	Michael Olise	France	Forward	(Germany) Bayern Munich	296
10	Fabián Ruiz	Spain	Midfielder	(France) Paris Saint-Germain	201
11	Jude Bellingham	England	Midfielder	(Spain) Real Madrid	107
12	Pau Cubarsí	Spain	Defender	(Spain) Barcelona	101
13	Achraf Hakimi	Morocco	Defender	(France) Paris Saint-Germain	65
14	Vitinha	Portugal	Midfielder	(France) Paris Saint-Germain	59
15	Declan Rice	England	Midfielder	(England) Arsenal	57
16	Ferran Torres	Spain	Forward	(Spain) Barcelona	44
17	Vinícius Júnior	Brazil	Forward	(Spain) Real Madrid	26
18	Marc Cucurella	Spain	Defender	(England) Chelsea	16
19	João Neves	Portugal	Midfielder	(France) Paris Saint-Germain	15
20	Willian Pacho	Ecuador	Defender	(France) Paris Saint-Germain	12
21	Gabriel Magalhães	Brazil	Defender	(England) Arsenal	11
22	Lautaro Martínez	Argentina	Forward	(Italy) Inter Milan	11
23	Nuno Mendes	Portugal	Defender	(France) Paris Saint-Germain	8
24	Luis Díaz	Colombia	Forward	(Germany) Bayern Munich	8
25	Marquinhos	Brazil	Defender	(France) Paris Saint-Germain	7
26	Dayot Upamecano	France	Defender	(Germany) Bayern Munich	5
27	Bruno Fernandes	Portugal	Midfielder	(England) Manchester United	5
28	Julián Quiñones	Mexico	Forward	(Saudi Arabia) Al-Qadsiah	4
29	Sadio Mané	Senegal	Forward	(Saudi Arabia) Al Nassr	2
29	William Saliba	France	Defender	(England) Arsenal	2

== Ballon d'Or Féminin ==
Thirty players were nominated for the 2026 Ballon d'Or Féminin.

2026 Ballon d'Or Féminin
Rank	Player	Nationality	Position	Club	Points
1	Alexia Putellas	Spain	Midfielder	(Spain) Barcelona	618
2	Ewa Pajor	Poland	Forward	(Spain) Barcelona	532
3	Khadija Shaw	Jamaica	Forward	(England) Manchester City	344
4	Melchie Dumornay	Haiti	Midfielder	(France) OL Lyonnes	342
5	Patricia Guijarro	Spain	Midfielder	(Spain) Barcelona	221
6	Caroline Graham Hansen	Norway	Forward	(Spain) Barcelona	220
7	Pernille Harder	Denmark	Forward	(Germany) Bayern Munich	220
8	Clàudia Pina	Spain	Forward	(Spain) Barcelona	155
9	Alessia Russo	England	Forward	(England) Arsenal	155
10	Temwa Chaŵinga	Malawi	Forward	(United States) Kansas City Current	113
11	Yui Hasegawa	Japan	Midfielder	(England) Manchester City	89
12	Klara Bühl	Germany	Forward	(Germany) Bayern Munich	89
13	Mariona Caldentey	Spain	Forward	(England) Arsenal	69
14	Wendie Renard	France	Defender	(France) OL Lyonnes	21
15	Cata Coll	Spain	Goalkeeper	(Spain) Barcelona	21
16	Mapi León	Spain	Defender	(Spain) Barcelona	20
17	Esmee Brugts	Netherlands	Midfielder	(Spain) Barcelona	19
18	Barbra Banda	Zambia	Forward	(United States) Orlando Pride	18
19	Tessa Wullaert	Belgium	Forward	(Italy) Inter Milan	15
20	Selma Bacha	France	Defender	(France) OL Lyonnes	15
21	Scarlett Camberos	Mexico	Forward	(Mexico) Club América	14
22	Manaka Matsukubo	Japan	Forward	(United States) North Carolina Courage	9
23	Momoko Tanikawa	Japan	Midfielder	(Germany) Bayern Munich	8
24	Kerstin Casparij	Netherlands	Defender	(England) Manchester City	7
25	Caroline Weir	Scotland	Midfielder	(Spain) Real Madrid	7
26	Alex Greenwood	England	Defender	(England) Manchester City	7
27	Rose Lavelle	United States	Midfielder	(United States) Gotham FC	2
28	Lorena	Brazil	Goalkeeper	(United States) Kansas City Current	0
28	Melvine Malard	France	Forward	(England) Manchester United	0
28	Vivianne Miedema	Netherlands	Forward	(England) Manchester City	0

== Men's Young Talent of the Year ==
Ten players were nominated for the 2026 Men's Young Talent of the Year.

2026 Young Talent of the Year Nominees
Rank	Player	Nationality	Position	Club	Points
1	Lamine Yamal	Spain	Forward	(Spain) Barcelona	96
2	Pau Cubarsí	Spain	Defender	(Spain) Barcelona	94
3	Warren Zaïre-Emery	France	Midfielder	(France) Paris Saint-Germain	20
4	Lennart Karl	Germany	Forward	(Germany) Bayern Munich	10
5	Yan Diomande	Ivory Coast	Forward	(Germany) RB Leipzig	8
6	Ayyoub Bouaddi	Morocco	Midfielder	(France) Lille	7
7	Kerim Alajbegović	Bosnia and Herzegovina	Forward	(Austria) Red Bull Salzburg	5
8	Eli Junior Kroupi	France	Forward	(England) Bournemouth	2
9	Ibrahim Maza	Algeria	Midfielder	(Germany) Bayer Leverkusen	1
10	Johan Manzambi	Switzerland	Midfielder	(Germany) Freiburg	0

== Women's Young Talent of the Year ==
Five players were nominated for the 2026 Women's Young Talent of the Year.

2026 Women's Young Talent of the Year Nominees
Rank	Player	Nationality	Position	Club	Points
1	Vicky López	Spain	Midfielder	(Spain) Barcelona	21
2	Clara Serrajordi	Spain	Midfielder	(Spain) Barcelona	11
3	Veerle Buurman	Netherlands	Defender	(England) Chelsea	7
4	Lily Yohannes	United States	Midfielder	(France) OL Lyonnes	7
5	Felicia Schröder	Sweden	Forward	(Sweden) BK Häcken	2

== Men's Goalkeeper of the Year ==
Ten goalkeepers were nominated for the 2026 Men's Goalkeeper of the Year.

2026 Men's Goalkeeper of the Year Nominees
Rank	Player	Nationality	Club	Points
1	Unai Simón	Spain	(Spain) Athletic Bilbao	351
2	David Raya	Spain	(England) Arsenal	223
3	Thibaut Courtois	Belgium	(Spain) Real Madrid	77
4	Matvey Safonov	Russia	(France) Paris Saint-Germain	67
5	Emiliano Martínez	Argentina	(England) Aston Villa	61
6	Vozinha	Cape Verde	(Portugal) Chaves	45
7	Joan Garcia	Spain	(Spain) Barcelona	34
8	Yassine Bounou	Morocco	(Saudi Arabia) Al-Hilal	30
9	Édouard Mendy	Senegal	(Saudi Arabia) Al-Ahli	8
10	Gregor Kobel	Switzerland	(Germany) Borussia Dortmund	4

== Women's Goalkeeper of the Year ==
Five goalkeepers were nominated for the 2026 Women's Goalkeeper of the Year.

2026 Women's Goalkeeper of the Year Nominees
Rank	Player	Nationality	Club	Points
1	Cata Coll	Spain	(Spain) Barcelona	85
2	Ann-Katrin Berger	Germany	(United States) Gotham FC	22
3	Ayaka Yamashita	Japan	(England) Manchester City	21
4	Hannah Hampton	England	(England) Chelsea	16
5	Lorena	Brazil	(United States) Kansas City Current	6

== Striker of the Year ==
2026 Men's Striker of the Year winner
Rank	Player	Nationality	Position	Club	Goals
1	Harry Kane	England	Forward	(Germany) Bayern Munich	73
2	Erling Haaland	Norway	Forward	(England) Manchester City	58
2	Kylian Mbappé	France	Forward	(Spain) Real Madrid	58
4	Lionel Messi	Argentina	Forward	(United States) Inter Miami	45
5	Luis Suárez	Colombia	Forward	(Portugal) Sporting	43

2026 Women's Striker of the Year winner
Rank	Player	Nationality	Position	Club	Goals
1	Charlyn Corral	Mexico	Forward	(Mexico) Pachuca	49
2	Diana Ordóñez	Mexico	Forward	(Mexico) Tigres UANL	38
3	Felicia Schröder	Sweden	Forward	(Sweden) BK Häcken	36
3	Khadija Shaw	Jamaica	Forward	(England) Manchester City	36
5	Pernille Harder	Denmark	Forward	(Germany) Bayern Munich	35

== Sócrates Award ==
2026 Sócrates Award winner
Player	Nationality	Position	Club
Bukayo Saka	England	Forward	(England) Arsenal

== Men's Club of the Year ==
2026 Men's Club of the Year ranking
Rank	Club	Total	Ballon d'Or	Points
1	(France) Paris Saint-Germain	9	Khvicha Kvaratskhelia (GEO); Ousmane Dembélé (FRA); Fabián Ruiz (ESP); Achraf Hakimi (MAR); Vitinha (POR); João Neves (POR); Willian Pacho (ECU); Nuno Mendes (POR); Marquinhos (BRA)	182
2	(England) Arsenal	3	Declan Rice (ENG); Gabriel Magalhães (BRA); William Saliba (FRA)	90
3	(Norway) Bodø/Glimt	0		11
4	(Germany) Bayern Munich	4	Harry Kane (ENG); Michael Olise (FRA); Luis Díaz (COL); Dayot Upamecano (FRA)	10
5	(Brazil) Flamengo	0		7

== Women's Club of the Year ==
2026 Women's Club of the Year ranking
Rank	Club	Total	Ballon d'Or	Points
1	(Spain) Barcelona	8	Alexia Putellas (ESP); Ewa Pajor (POL); Patricia Guijarro (ESP); Caroline Graham Hansen (NOR); Clàudia Pina (ESP); Cata Coll (ESP); Mapi León (ESP); Esmee Brugts (NED)	95
2	(France) OL Lyonnes	3	Melchie Dumornay (HAI); Wendie Renard (FRA); Selma Bacha (FRA)	24
3	(England) Manchester City	5	Khadija Shaw (JAM); Yui Hasegawa (JPN); Kerstin Casparij (NED); Alex Greenwood (ENG); Vivianne Miedema (NED)	19
4	(Germany) Bayern Munich	3	Pernille Harder (DEN); Klara Bühl (GER); Momoko Tanikawa (JPN)	6
4	(Mexico) Club América	1	Scarlett Camberos (MEX)	6

== Men's Coach of the Year ==
Five coaches were nominated for the 2026 Men's Johan Cruyff Trophy.

Rank	Coach	Nationality	Team	Points
1	Luis de la Fuente	Spain	Spain	167
2	Luis Enrique	Spain	(France) Paris Saint-Germain	117
3	Mikel Arteta	Spain	(England) Arsenal	15
4	Unai Emery	Spain	(England) Aston Villa	1
5	Vincent Kompany	Belgium	(Germany) Bayern Munich	0

== Women's Coach of the Year ==
Five coaches were nominated for the 2026 Women's Johan Cruyff Trophy.

Rank	Coach	Nationality	Team(s)	Points
1	Pere Romeu	Spain	(Spain) Barcelona	84
2	Jonatan Giráldez	Spain	(France) OL Lyonnes	26
3	Andrée Jeglertz	Sweden	(England) Manchester City	22
4	Elena Sadiku	Sweden	(Scotland) Celtic (Sweden) BK Häcken	9
5	Nils Nielsen	Denmark	Japan	9
