= 2024 Ballon d'Or =

Annual association football award event in France

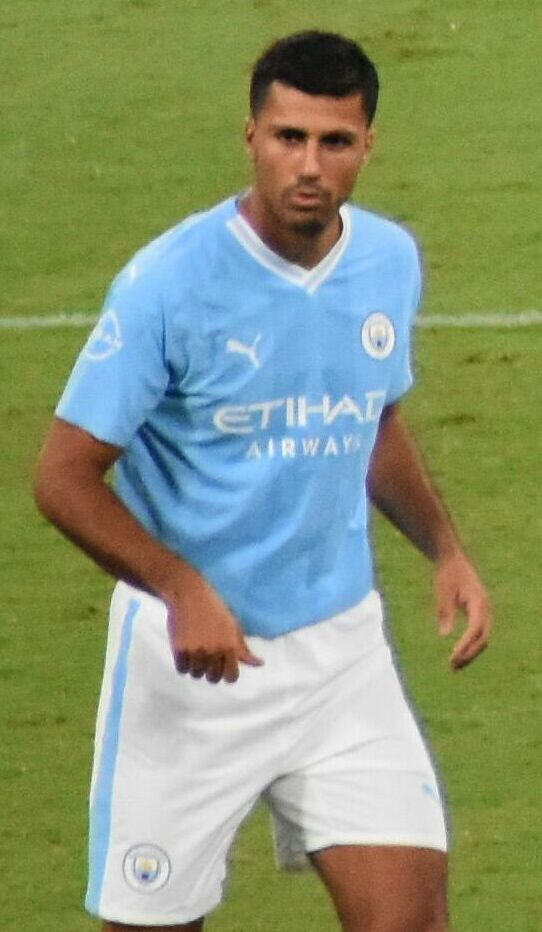
- 2024 Ballon d'Or winner, Rodri
- Date: 28 October 2024
- Location: Théâtre du Châtelet, Paris
- Presented by: France Football
- Hosted by: Sandy Heribert; Didier Drogba

Highlights
- Ballon d'Or: (Spain) Rodri (1st award)
- Ballon d'Or Féminin: (Spain) Aitana Bonmatí (2nd award)
- Kopa Trophy: (Spain) Lamine Yamal (1st award)
- Yashin Trophy: (Argentina) Emiliano Martínez (2nd award)
- Sócrates Award: (Spain) Jenni Hermoso (1st award)
- Website: ballondor.com

The 2024 Ballon d'Or (lit. '2024 Golden Ball'), was the 68th annual ceremony of the Ballon d'Or. Presented by France Football, the ceremony recognise the best footballers in the world for the 2023–24 season. It was the third ceremony during which awards were presented based on the results of the season instead of the calendar year, specifically the period from 1 August 2023 to 31 July 2024. The nominees were announced on 4 September 2024 and the ceremony took take place on 28 October 2024. Two new accolades were awarded: Men's Coach of the Year and Women's Coach of the Year, recognizing the contribution of coaches to success on the pitch. UEFA co-organized the Ballon d'Or gala for the first time, while France Football retained the voting system and the Ballon d'Or name.

For the first time, both the men's and women's Ballons d'Or were awarded to players from the same country, with Rodri and Aitana Bonmatí coming from Spain, in addition to the Kopa Trophy being also awarded to Lamine Yamal, also from Spain.

== Ballon d'Or ==
Club listed is the one which the player represented during the 2023–24 season (1 August 2023 to 31 July 2024). For players who appeared for multiple clubs during the season, only the most recent club is listed.

Thirty players were nominated for the 2024 Ballon d'Or.

2024 Ballon d'Or
Rank	Player	Nationality	Position	Club	Points
1	Rodri	Spain	Midfielder	(England) Manchester City	1170
2	Vinícius Júnior	Brazil	Forward	(Spain) Real Madrid	1129
3	Jude Bellingham	England	Midfielder	(Spain) Real Madrid	917
4	Dani Carvajal	Spain	Defender	(Spain) Real Madrid	550
5	Erling Haaland	Norway	Forward	(England) Manchester City	432
6	Kylian Mbappé	France	Forward	(France) Paris Saint-Germain (Note: Mbappé was signed by Real Madrid from Paris Saint-Germain after the end of season.)	420
7	Lautaro Martínez	Argentina	Forward	(Italy) Inter Milan	402
8	Lamine Yamal	Spain	Forward	(Spain) Barcelona	383
9	Toni Kroos	Germany	Midfielder	(Spain) Real Madrid	291
10	Harry Kane	England	Forward	(Germany) Bayern Munich	201
11	Phil Foden	England	Midfielder	(England) Manchester City	157
12	Florian Wirtz	Germany	Midfielder	(Germany) Bayer Leverkusen	101
13	Dani Olmo	Spain	Midfielder	(Germany) RB Leipzig (Note: Olmo was signed by Barcelona from RB Leipzig after the end of season.)	86
14	Ademola Lookman	Nigeria	Forward	(Italy) Atalanta	82
15	Nico Williams	Spain	Forward	(Spain) Athletic Bilbao	73
16	Granit Xhaka	Switzerland	Midfielder	(Germany) Bayer Leverkusen	60
17	Federico Valverde	Uruguay	Midfielder	(Spain) Real Madrid	58
18	Emiliano Martínez	Argentina	Goalkeeper	(England) Aston Villa	28
19	Martin Ødegaard	Norway	Midfielder	(England) Arsenal	16
20	Hakan Çalhanoğlu	Turkey	Midfielder	(Italy) Inter Milan	15
21	Bukayo Saka	England	Forward	(England) Arsenal	14
22	Antonio Rüdiger	Germany	Defender	(Spain) Real Madrid	13
23	Rúben Dias	Portugal	Defender	(England) Manchester City	8
24	William Saliba	France	Defender	(England) Arsenal	8
25	Cole Palmer	England	Forward	(England) Chelsea	7
26	Declan Rice	England	Midfielder	(England) Arsenal	5
27	Vitinha	Portugal	Midfielder	(France) Paris Saint-Germain	5
28	Álex Grimaldo	Spain	Defender	(Germany) Bayer Leverkusen	2
29	Artem Dovbyk	Ukraine	Forward	(Spain) Girona	0
29	Mats Hummels	Germany	Defender	(Germany) Borussia Dortmund	0

Ballon D'Or Detailed Votes by Country
Country	Rodri	Vinicius Junior	Jude Bellingham	Dani Carvajal	Erling Haaland	Kylian Mbappe	Lautaro Martinez	Lamine Yamal	Toni Kroos	Harry Kane	Phil Foden	Florian Wirtz	Dani Olmo	Ademola Lookman	Nico Williams	Granit Xhaka	Federico Valverde	Emiliano Martinez	Martin Odegaard	Hakan Calhanoglu	Bukayo Saka	Antonio Rudiger	William Saliba	Ruben Dias	Cole Palmer	Declan Rice	Vitinha	Alex Grimaldo
Albania	15	3	8	10	5	2	4	12	0	0	0	0	0	0	0	1	0	0	0	0	0	7	0	0	0	0	0	0
Algeria	5	15	8	2	12	7	0	10	4	0	3	0	1	0	0	0	0	0	0	0	0	0	0	0	0	0	0	0
Angola	8	10	12	15	1	3	5	0	4	2	7	0	0	0	0	0	0	0	0	0	0	0	0	0	0	0	0	0
Argentina	12	10	7	1	4	0	5	2	15	0	8	3	0	0	0	0	0	0	0	0	0	0	0	0	0	0	0	0
Armenia	12	15	10	8	4	5	2	1	0	7	3	0	0	0	0	0	0	0	0	0	0	0	0	0	0	0	0	0
Australia	15	12	10	8	0	5	7	1	0	0	3	4	0	0	2	0	0	0	0	0	0	0	0	0	0	0	0	0
Austria	15	12	10	0	3	7	2	8	5	4	0	0	1	0	0	0	0	0	0	0	0	0	0	0	0	0	0	0
Bahrain	0	15	8	1	10	12	4	7	0	2	5	0	0	0	0	3	0	0	0	0	0	0	0	0	0	0	0	0
Belarus	15	8	12	0	5	10	1	7	2	3	4	0	0	0	0	0	0	0	0	0	0	0	0	0	0	0	0	0
Belgium	12	15	1	2	7	0	0	10	4	5	0	0	8	0	3	0	0	0	0	0	0	0	0	0	0	0	0	0
Benin	10	15	12	8	2	7	4	1	5	3	0	0	0	0	0	0	0	0	0	0	0	0	0	0	0	0	0	0
Bolivia	0	15	10	1	3	12	4	8	7	0	0	0	0	0	0	0	5	0	0	0	0	0	0	2	0	0	0	0
Bosnia and Herzegovina	15	10	12	8	7	3	4	2	0	5	0	1	0	0	0	0	0	0	0	0	0	0	0	0	0	0	0	0
Brazil	12	15	10	3	2	8	0	0	5	7	1	4	0	0	0	0	0	0	0	0	0	0	0	0	0	0	0	0
Bulgaria	15	7	12	10	4	3	5	8	2	0	0	0	0	0	0	1	0	0	0	0	0	0	0	0	0	0	0	0
Burkina Faso	12	15	10	8	0	3	7	5	2	4	0	0	0	1	0	0	0	0	0	0	0	0	0	0	0	0	0	0
Cameroon	10	15	12	8	0	7	0	1	0	3	0	0	0	4	0	0	5	0	2	0	0	0	0	0	0	0	0	0
Canada	15	12	10	4	7	8	2	5	0	3	0	0	0	0	0	0	0	0	1	0	0	0	0	0	0	0	0	0
Cape Verde	7	15	12	0	8	10	0	0	5	0	4	0	1	0	0	0	2	0	3	0	0	0	0	0	0	0	0	0
Chile	15	7	1	10	5	2	12	0	0	0	0	8	0	0	0	3	0	4	0	0	0	0	0	0	0	0	0	0
China PR	15	10	12	8	0	0	5	7	4	0	2	0	0	0	1	3	0	0	0	0	0	0	0	0	0	0	0	0
Colombia	0	15	3	12	7	8	0	10	4	5	0	0	0	0	1	0	0	0	0	0	2	0	0	0	0	0	0	0
Congo DR	5	15	12	10	0	1	3	0	8	7	0	0	0	0	2	0	4	0	0	0	0	0	0	0	0	0	0	0
Costa Rica	15	7	12	1	5	3	10	8	0	4	0	2	0	0	0	0	0	0	0	0	0	0	0	0	0	0	0	0
Croatia	15	8	2	12	5	7	10	4	1	0	0	3	0	0	0	0	0	0	0	0	0	0	0	0	0	0	0	0
Curaçao	15	12	10	7	4	5	8	0	0	2	3	0	0	0	0	0	0	0	0	0	0	1	0	0	0	0	0	0
Czech Republic	15	2	7	1	5	0	8	10	12	4	0	0	3	0	0	0	0	0	0	0	0	0	0	0	0	0	0	0
Denmark	15	12	7	0	10	3	2	0	8	0	5	0	0	0	0	4	0	0	1	0	0	0	0	0	0	0	0	0
Ecuador	2	12	5	4	0	8	7	0	15	0	0	0	0	0	10	0	0	0	3	0	0	0	0	0	1	0	0	0
Egypt	12	15	10	8	5	7	4	1	0	3	2	0	0	0	0	0	0	0	0	0	0	0	0	0	0	0	0	0
El Salvador	4	0	15	0	12	0	8	0	10	0	2	3	7	0	0	0	0	0	0	5	0	0	0	1	0	0	0	0
England	15	12	10	8	2	0	5	7	0	0	4	1	0	0	0	0	0	3	0	0	0	0	0	0	0	0	0	0
Equatorial Guinea	10	15	8	7	5	0	0	3	0	0	0	0	2	4	12	0	0	0	0	0	0	0	0	1	0	0	0	0
Finland	15	0	10	1	12	0	0	4	8	0	0	7	0	2	0	0	0	0	0	0	0	0	3	0	0	5	0	0
France	12	15	10	0	3	8	4	7	0	5	1	2	0	0	0	0	0	0	0	0	0	0	0	0	0	0	0	0
Gabon	15	8	7	12	3	2	10	0	5	0	0	1	0	4	0	0	0	0	0	0	0	0	0	0	0	0	0	0
Georgia	12	7	15	1	4	0	10	2	5	0	0	0	8	0	0	0	3	0	0	0	0	0	0	0	0	0	0	0
Germany	15	12	7	0	0	2	0	1	4	3	0	8	5	0	0	10	0	0	0	0	0	0	0	0	0	0	0	0
Ghana	15	12	8	5	10	2	0	7	4	0	1	0	0	3	0	0	0	0	0	0	0	0	0	0	0	0	0	0
Greece	10	15	2	7	0	0	5	8	3	0	0	0	0	12	0	0	4	1	0	0	0	0	0	0	0	0	0	0
Guinea	5	15	12	2	10	8	0	0	4	0	0	1	0	0	0	0	7	0	0	0	3	0	0	0	0	0	0	0
Haiti	8	15	12	7	2	3	10	0	1	4	5	0	0	0	0	0	0	0	0	0	0	0	0	0	0	0	0	0
Honduras	15	4	5	10	3	2	12	8	1	7	0	0	0	0	0	0	0	0	0	0	0	0	0	0	0	0	0	0
Hungary	12	10	3	15	4	0	0	8	5	7	0	1	2	0	0	0	0	0	0	0	0	0	0	0	0	0	0	0
Iceland	15	12	10	8	5	2	7	1	3	0	4	0	0	0	0	0	0	0	0	0	0	0	0	0	0	0	0	0
Iran	15	12	10	5	3	4	7	0	1	8	0	2	0	0	0	0	0	0	0	0	0	0	0	0	0	0	0	0
Iraq	15	5	12	0	3	0	8	7	10	0	0	0	0	0	0	2	0	0	0	0	0	4	1	0	0	0	0	0
Israel	15	12	8	10	3	0	4	5	7	2	0	1	0	0	0	0	0	0	0	0	0	0	0	0	0	0	0	0
Italy	15	12	10	0	3	2	8	5	0	0	0	0	4	0	0	7	1	0	0	0	0	0	0	0	0	0	0	0
Ivory Coast	10	12	8	0	2	15	1	4	0	0	0	0	5	7	3	0	0	0	0	0	0	0	0	0	0	0	0	0
Jamaica	12	15	10	8	2	4	7	5	3	0	0	0	0	0	0	0	0	1	0	0	0	0	0	0	0	0	0	0
Japan	12	15	7	0	3	5	0	2	0	8	4	0	0	0	0	10	0	0	0	0	0	0	0	0	1	0	0	0
Jordan	7	15	12	10	0	2	0	8	0	3	0	5	1	4	0	0	0	0	0	0	0	0	0	0	0	0	0	0
Luxembourg	15	10	12	3	5	7	0	1	8	0	0	4	0	0	0	0	2	0	0	0	0	0	0	0	0	0	0	0
Mali	12	15	5	0	10	8	0	3	0	0	4	0	0	2	0	0	1	7	0	0	0	0	0	0	0	0	0	0
Mexico	10	15	8	12	7	1	0	2	3	0	5	0	0	0	0	0	4	0	0	0	0	0	0	0	0	0	0	0
Montenegro	15	12	4	0	7	3	8	10	1	0	0	5	0	0	0	0	0	0	0	0	2	0	0	0	0	0	0	0
Morocco	10	15	7	12	4	8	1	0	0	0	0	0	5	2	3	0	0	0	0	0	0	0	0	0	0	0	0	0
Namibia	12	0	15	4	1	5	8	10	3	2	0	0	0	0	0	7	0	0	0	0	0	0	0	0	0	0	0	0
Netherlands	15	12	10	0	3	0	7	8	1	0	2	4	0	0	5	0	0	0	0	0	0	0	0	0	0	0	0	0
New Zealand	15	12	10	5	4	8	2	7	1	3	0	0	0	0	0	0	0	0	0	0	0	0	0	0	0	0	0	0
Nigeria	8	12	10	0	5	0	0	0	0	2	7	0	3	15	4	0	0	0	0	0	0	1	0	0	0	0	0	0
North Macedonia	15	10	12	0	7	5	8	1	0	0	0	4	0	3	0	0	2	0	0	0	0	0	0	0	0	0	0	0
Northern Ireland	15	12	10	8	1	4	3	5	0	2	0	0	0	0	7	0	0	0	0	0	0	0	0	0	0	0	0	0
Norway	15	12	10	8	5	4	7	2	0	0	0	3	0	0	0	0	0	0	1	0	0	0	0	0	0	0	0	0
Oman	10	12	4	15	3	7	0	1	0	0	5	8	2	0	0	0	0	0	0	0	0	0	0	0	0	0	0	0
Palestine	15	12	10	0	8	7	0	0	0	1	0	0	0	0	2	0	0	0	4	0	5	0	3	0	0	0	0	0
Panama	0	15	10	8	4	1	3	12	0	5	0	0	7	0	0	0	2	0	0	0	0	0	0	0	0	0	0	0
Paraguay	8	15	10	2	3	12	0	7	5	0	4	0	0	0	0	0	1	0	0	0	0	0	0	0	0	0	0	0
Peru	12	10	8	15	5	7	2	3	0	0	0	0	0	0	1	0	4	0	0	0	0	0	0	0	0	0	0	0
Poland	15	12	10	5	1	3	0	0	8	2	0	0	7	0	4	0	0	0	0	0	0	0	0	0	0	0	0	0
Portugal	15	7	10	0	8	2	0	5	12	0	0	0	0	4	0	0	0	0	0	0	0	0	0	0	0	0	3	1
Qatar	12	15	10	5	3	8	1	0	7	0	0	0	4	0	0	0	0	0	0	0	0	0	0	0	0	0	2	0
Republic of Ireland	15	8	10	12	0	0	7	0	4	1	2	0	0	3	0	5	0	0	0	0	0	0	0	0	0	0	0	0
Romania	15	12	4	10	7	3	0	8	2	0	5	0	1	0	0	0	0	0	0	0	0	0	0	0	0	0	0	0
Russia	12	15	8	10	3	4	0	2	7	1	0	0	5	0	0	0	0	0	0	0	0	0	0	0	0	0	0	0
Saudi Arabia	12	15	8	10	1	5	7	2	4	0	3	0	0	0	0	0	0	0	0	0	0	0	0	0	0	0	0	0
Scotland	7	12	15	2	8	10	0	5	0	4	0	3	0	0	0	1	0	0	0	0	0	0	0	0	0	0	0	0
Senegal	10	15	12	8	3	0	5	4	0	0	7	2	0	1	0	0	0	0	0	0	0	0	0	0	0	0	0	0
Serbia	15	12	7	3	10	5	0	8	2	0	1	0	0	0	0	0	0	0	0	0	0	0	0	4	0	0	0	0
Slovakia	15	12	10	8	2	4	1	0	7	5	3	0	0	0	0	0	0	0	0	0	0	0	0	0	0	0	0	0
Slovenia	3	7	15	0	12	10	8	0	0	4	5	1	0	0	2	0	0	0	0	0	0	0	0	0	0	0	0	0
South Africa	15	12	4	5	10	0	7	8	0	0	1	0	0	3	2	0	0	0	0	0	0	0	0	0	0	0	0	0
South Korea	4	3	7	0	15	12	8	0	0	10	0	0	1	0	0	0	0	5	0	0	2	0	0	0	0	0	0	0
Spain	12	15	10	7	0	4	0	5	8	0	3	2	0	0	0	0	0	0	0	0	0	0	0	0	0	0	0	1
Sweden	15	10	12	8	7	1	5	3	4	0	2	0	0	0	0	0	0	0	0	0	0	0	0	0	0	0	0	0
Switzerland	12	15	10	8	4	2	7	3	0	1	5	0	0	0	0	0	0	0	0	0	0	0	0	0	0	0	0	0
Trinidad and Tobago	12	10	8	4	0	0	15	0	0	0	5	0	0	1	2	0	0	7	0	0	0	0	0	0	3	0	0	0
Tunisia	15	10	12	0	5	0	0	7	0	4	2	1	0	0	0	3	8	0	0	0	0	0	0	0	0	0	0	0
Turkey	12	15	8	4	0	1	7	3	0	2	5	0	0	0	0	0	0	0	0	10	0	0	0	0	0	0	0	0
Uganda	15	3	12	10	4	5	8	0	0	7	2	0	0	1	0	0	0	0	0	0	0	0	0	0	0	0	0	0
Ukraine	15	8	10	12	0	2	4	7	0	0	3	5	0	1	0	0	0	0	0	0	0	0	0	0	0	0	0	0
United Arab Emirates	0	15	12	2	10	8	5	3	1	7	0	0	0	4	0	0	0	0	0	0	0	0	0	0	0	0	0	0
United States	15	12	10	8	0	4	7	5	0	3	0	0	1	0	2	0	0	0	0	0	0	0	0	0	0	0	0	0
Uruguay	15	10	8	5	7	0	4	2	12	0	0	0	0	0	0	0	3	0	1	0	0	0	0	0	0	0	0	0
Uzbekistan	15	10	12	8	4	7	0	3	0	5	0	0	0	0	0	0	0	0	0	0	0	0	1	0	2	0	0	0
Venezuela	15	12	10	7	1	0	8	4	5	3	2	0	0	0	0	0	0	0	0	0	0	0	0	0	0	0	0	0
Wales	12	15	10	7	1	8	5	4	0	0	3	2	0	0	0	0	0	0	0	0	0	0	0	0	0	0	0	0
Zambia	15	12	10	4	0	8	3	0	0	7	0	0	2	1	5	0	0	0	0	0	0	0	0	0	0	0	0	0

== Ballon d'Or Féminin ==
Thirty players were nominated for the 2024 Ballon d'Or Féminin.

2024 Ballon d'Or Féminin
Rank	Player	Nationality	Position	Club	Points
1	Aitana Bonmatí	Spain	Midfielder	(Spain) Barcelona	675
2	Caroline Graham Hansen	Norway	Forward	(Spain) Barcelona	392
3	Salma Paralluelo	Spain	Forward	(Spain) Barcelona	246
4	Sophia Smith	United States	Forward	(United States) Portland Thorns	228
5	Lindsey Horan	United States	Midfielder	(France) Lyon	169
6	Mallory Swanson	United States	Forward	(United States) Chicago Red Stars	164
7	Marie-Antoinette Katoto	France	Forward	(France) Paris Saint-Germain	142
8	Mariona Caldentey	Spain	Forward	(Spain) Barcelona (Note: Mariona Caldentey was signed by Arsenal from Barcelona after the season.)	142
9	Trinity Rodman	United States	Forward	(United States) Washington Spirit	137
10	Alexia Putellas	Spain	Midfielder	(Spain) Barcelona	130
11	Patricia Guijarro	Spain	Midfielder	(Spain) Barcelona	117
12	Barbra Banda	Zambia	Forward	(United States) Orlando Pride (Note: Banda was signed by Orlando Pride from Shanghai Shengli during the season.)	92
13	Lauren James	England	Forward	(England) Chelsea	83
14	Ada Hegerberg	Norway	Forward	(France) Lyon	83
15	Khadija Shaw	Jamaica	Forward	(England) Manchester City	78
16	Tabitha Chawinga	Malawi	Forward	(France) Lyon (Note: Chawinga was on loan from Lyon to Paris Saint-Germain during the season.)	70
17	Alyssa Naeher	United States	Goalkeeper	(United States) Chicago Red Stars	52
18	Gabi Portilho	Brazil	Forward	(Brazil) Corinthians	47
19	Giulia Gwinn	Germany	Defender	(Germany) Bayern Munich	42
20	Lucy Bronze	England	Defender	(Spain) Barcelona (Note: Bronze was signed by Chelsea from Barcelona after the season.)	40
21	Mayra Ramírez	Colombia	Forward	(England) Chelsea (Note: Mayra Ramírez was signed by Chelsea from Levante during the season.)	36
22	Glódís Viggósdóttir	Iceland	Defender	(Germany) Bayern Munich	26
23	Tarciane	Brazil	Defender	(United States) Houston Dash (Note: Tarciane was signed by Houston Dash from Corinthians during the season.)	24
24	Lea Schüller	Germany	Forward	(Germany) Bayern Munich	24
25	Sjoeke Nüsken	Germany	Midfielder	(England) Chelsea	15
26	Yui Hasegawa	Japan	Midfielder	(England) Manchester City	11
27	Manuela Giugliano	Italy	Midfielder	(Italy) Roma	10
28	Lauren Hemp	England	Forward	(England) Manchester City	5
29	Ewa Pajor	Poland	Forward	(Germany) Wolfsburg (Note: Pajor was signed Barcelona from Wolfsburg after the season.)	2
30	Grace Geyoro	France	Midfielder	(France) Paris Saint-Germain	1

== Kopa Trophy ==
Club listed is the one which the player represented during the 2023–24 season. For players who appeared for multiple clubs during the season, only the most recent club is listed.

Ten players were nominated for the 2024 Kopa Trophy.

2024 Kopa Trophy ranking
Rank	Player	Nationality	Position	Club	Points
1	Lamine Yamal	Spain	Forward	(Spain) Barcelona	113
2	Arda Güler	Turkey	Midfielder	(Spain) Real Madrid	26
3	Kobbie Mainoo	England	Midfielder	(England) Manchester United	20
4	Savinho	Brazil	Forward	(Spain) Girona	19
5	Pau Cubarsí	Spain	Defender	(Spain) Barcelona	8
6	Alejandro Garnacho	Argentina	Forward	(England) Manchester United	6
6	João Neves	Portugal	Midfielder	(Portugal) Benfica	6
8	Karim Konaté	Ivory Coast	Forward	(Austria) Red Bull Salzburg	3
8	Mathys Tel	France	Forward	(Germany) Bayern Munich	3
8	Warren Zaïre-Emery	France	Midfielder	(France) Paris Saint-Germain	3

== Yashin Trophy ==
Ten goalkeepers were nominated for the 2024 Yashin Trophy.

2024 Yashin Trophy ranking
Rank	Player	Nationality	Club	Points
1	Emiliano Martínez	Argentina	(England) Aston Villa	276
2	Unai Simón	Spain	(Spain) Athletic Bilbao	213
3	Andriy Lunin	Ukraine	(Spain) Real Madrid	112
4	Gianluigi Donnarumma	Italy	(France) Paris Saint-Germain	58
5	Mike Maignan	France	(Italy) Milan	56
6	Yann Sommer	Switzerland	(Italy) Inter Milan	51
7	Giorgi Mamardashvili	Georgia	(Spain) Valencia	50
8	Diogo Costa	Portugal	(Portugal) Porto	28
9	Ronwen Williams	South Africa	(South Africa) Mamelodi Sundowns	27
10	Gregor Kobel	Switzerland	(Germany) Borussia Dortmund	20

== Gerd Müller Trophy ==
2024 Gerd Müller Trophy ranking
Rank	Player	Nationality	Position	Club	Goals
1	Harry Kane	England	Forward	(Germany) Bayern Munich	52
1	Kylian Mbappé	France	Forward	(France) Paris Saint-Germain	52

== Sócrates Award ==
Jenni Hermoso won the 2024 Socrates Award for her work against sexual abuse, specifically her work bringing awareness to others after then-Spanish Federation President Luis Rubiales kissed Hermoso on the lips without her consent.

2024 Sócrates Award winner
Player	Nationality	Position	Club
Jenni Hermoso	Spain	Forward	(Mexico) Tigres UANL

== Men's Club of the Year ==
2024 Men's Club of the Year ranking
Rank	Club	Total	Ballon d'Or
1	(Spain) Real Madrid	6	Jude Bellingham (ENG); Dani Carvajal (ESP); Antonio Rüdiger (GER); Federico Valverde (URU); Vinícius Júnior (BRA); Toni Kroos (GER)

== Women's Club of the Year ==
2024 Women's Club of the Year ranking
Rank	Club	Total	Ballon d'Or Féminin
1	(Spain) Barcelona	6	Aitana Bonmatí (ESP); Salma Paralluelo (ESP); Caroline Graham Hansen (NOR); Patricia Guijarro (ESP); Lucy Bronze (ENG); Alexia Putellas (ESP)

== Men's Johan Cruyff Trophy ==
Six coaches were nominated for the 2024 Men's Coach of the Year Award, now named as Men's Johan Cruyff Trophy.

2024 Men's Coach of the Year Award
Rank	Coach	Nationality	Team	Points
1	Carlo Ancelotti	Italy	(Spain) Real Madrid	118
2	Xabi Alonso	Spain	(Germany) Bayer Leverkusen	89
3	Luis de la Fuente	Spain	Spain	63
4	Pep Guardiola	Spain	(England) Manchester City	13
5	Lionel Scaloni	Argentina	Argentina	8
6	Gian Piero Gasperini	Italy	(Italy) Atalanta	6

== Women's Johan Cruyff Trophy ==
Six coaches were nominated for the 2024 Women's Coach of the Year Award, now named as Women's Johan Cruyff Trophy.

2024 Women's Coach of the Year Award
Rank	Coach	Nationality	Team	Points
1	Emma Hayes	England	(England) Chelsea; United States	72
2	Jonatan Giráldez	Spain	(Spain) Barcelona (United States) Washington Spirit	49
3	Arthur Elias	Brazil	Corinthians; Brazil	14
4	Sonia Bompastor	France	(France) Lyon	5
5	Filipa Patão	Portugal	(Portugal) Benfica	4
6	Sarina Wiegman	Netherlands	England	3

== Controversy ==
Despite winning the Men’s Club of the Year award and their manager, Carlo Ancelotti, receiving the Men's Johan Cruyff Trophy, Real Madrid boycotted the Ballon d’Or ceremony in protest against Vinícius Júnior not being the anticipated winner of the award, which they believed he deserved. Renowned media outlets such as Marca, ESPN FC, and SPORTbible had previously reported through their sources that he was expected to win, and Nike had even planned to launch the "Ballon d'Or Boots" for him in celebration of the achievement.

Fabrizio Romano, a popular football journalist, confirmed on his Twitter at 1:56 AM on October 28, 2024, that "no one from Real Madrid [would] attend the Ballon d’Or ceremony in Paris. No Ancelotti, no Bellingham, no Florentino Pérez... to support Vinícius Jr."
