= 2025 Ballon d'Or =

Annual association football award event in France

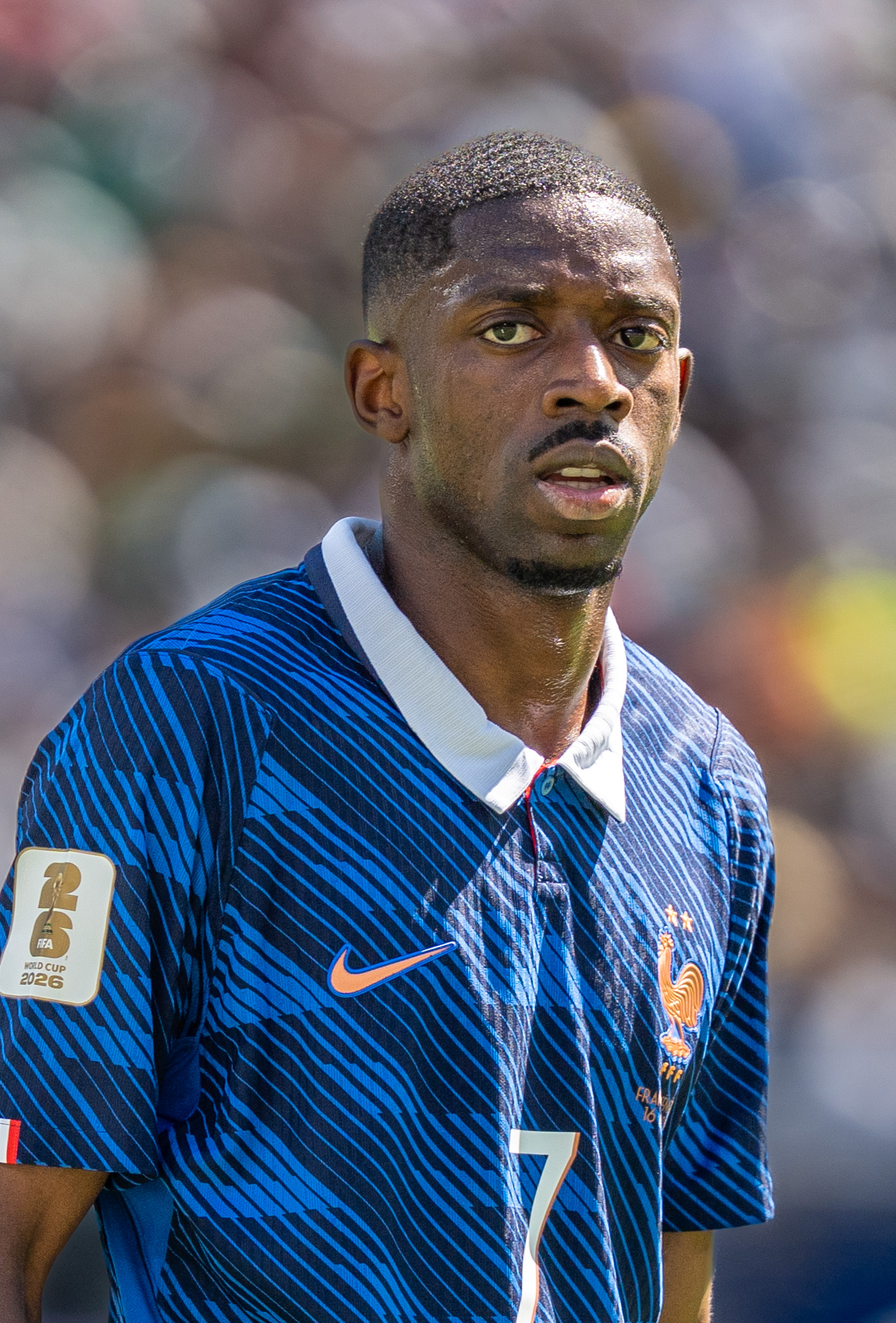
- 2025 Ballon d'Or winner, Ousmane Dembélé
- Date: 22 September 2025
- Location: Théâtre du Châtelet, Paris, France
- Presented by: France Football
- Hosted by: Kate Scott; Ruud Gullit

Highlights
- Ballon d'Or: (France) Ousmane Dembélé (1st award)
- Ballon d'Or Féminin: (Spain) Aitana Bonmatí (3rd award)
- Kopa Trophy: Men's: (Spain) Lamine Yamal (2nd award); Women's: (Spain) Vicky López (1st award)
- Yashin Trophy: Men's: (Italy) Gianluigi Donnarumma (2nd award); Women's: (England) Hannah Hampton (1st award)
- Gerd Müller Trophy: Men's: (Sweden) Viktor Gyökeres (1st award); Women's: (Poland) Ewa Pajor (1st award)
- Website: ballondor.com

The 2025 Ballon d'Or (lit. '2025 Golden Ball') was the 69th annual ceremony of the Ballon d'Or, presented by France Football, recognising the best footballers in the world in the 2024–25 season. For the fourth time in the history of the award, it was awarded based on the results of the season instead of the calendar year. This was the period from 1 August 2024 to 13 July 2025 (final of the 2025 FIFA Club World Cup) for the men's award, and to 2 August 2025 (final of the 2025 Copa América Femenina) for the women's award. The ceremony took place on 22 September 2025, with the nominees having been announced on 7 August 2025.

== Ballon d'Or ==
Club listed is the one which the player represented during the 2024–25 season.

30 players were nominated for the 2025 Men's Ballon d'Or.

2025 Ballon d'Or
Rank	Player	Nationality	Position	Club	Points
1	Ousmane Dembélé	France	Forward	(France) Paris Saint-Germain	1380
2	Lamine Yamal	Spain	Forward	(Spain) Barcelona	1059
3	Vitinha	Portugal	Midfielder	(France) Paris Saint-Germain	703
4	Mohamed Salah	Egypt	Forward	(England) Liverpool	657
5	Raphinha	Brazil	Forward	(Spain) Barcelona	620
6	Achraf Hakimi	Morocco	Defender	(France) Paris Saint-Germain	484
7	Kylian Mbappé	France	Forward	(Spain) Real Madrid	378
8	Cole Palmer	England	Forward	(England) Chelsea	211
9	Gianluigi Donnarumma	Italy	Goalkeeper	(France) Paris Saint-Germain	172
10	Nuno Mendes	Portugal	Defender	(France) Paris Saint-Germain	171
11	Pedri	Spain	Midfielder	(Spain) Barcelona	124
12	Khvicha Kvaratskhelia	Georgia	Forward	(Italy) Napoli (France) Paris Saint-Germain	123
13	Harry Kane	England	Forward	(Germany) Bayern Munich	112
14	Désiré Doué	France	Midfielder	(France) Paris Saint-Germain	74
15	Viktor Gyökeres	Sweden	Forward	(Portugal) Sporting CP	56
16	Vinícius Júnior	Brazil	Forward	(Spain) Real Madrid	51
17	Robert Lewandowski	Poland	Forward	(Spain) Barcelona	49
18	Scott McTominay	Scotland	Midfielder	(England) Manchester United (Italy) Napoli	45
19	João Neves	Portugal	Midfielder	(France) Paris Saint-Germain	40
20	Lautaro Martínez	Argentina	Forward	(Italy) Inter Milan	37
21	Serhou Guirassy	Guinea	Forward	(Germany) Borussia Dortmund	25
22	Alexis Mac Allister	Argentina	Midfielder	(England) Liverpool	21
23	Jude Bellingham	England	Midfielder	(Spain) Real Madrid	21
24	Fabián Ruiz	Spain	Midfielder	(France) Paris Saint-Germain	20
25	Denzel Dumfries	Netherlands	Defender	(Italy) Inter Milan	20
26	Erling Haaland	Norway	Forward	(England) Manchester City	18
27	Declan Rice	England	Midfielder	(England) Arsenal	13
28	Virgil van Dijk	Netherlands	Defender	(England) Liverpool	7
29	Florian Wirtz	Germany	Midfielder	(Germany) Bayer Leverkusen	5
30	Michael Olise	France	Forward	(Germany) Bayern Munich	4

Ballon D'Or Detailed Votes by Country
Country	Dembélé	Yamal	Vitinha	Salah	Raphinha	Hakimi	Mbappé	Palmer	Donnarumma	Mendes	Pedri	Kvaratskhelia	Kane	Doué	Gyökeres	Vinícius	Lewandowski	McTominay	Neves	L. Martínez	Guirassy	Mac Allister	Bellingham	Dumfries	Fabián	Haaland	Rice	Van Dijk	Wirtz	Olise
Albania	15	10	4	0	0	2	8	12	7	0	0	0	3	0	1	0	0	0	5	0	0	0	0	0	0	0	0	0	0	0
Algeria	12	15	0	5	10	7	0	2	0	0	8	0	0	3	0	0	4	0	1	0	0	0	0	0	0	0	0	0	0	0
Angola	15	10	12	2	8	0	7	3	5	4	1	0	0	0	0	0	0	0	0	0	0	0	0	0	0	0	0	0	0	0
Argentina	15	10	12	7	4	0	1	3	0	0	8	0	2	0	0	0	0	0	0	0	0	5	0	0	0	0	0	0	0	0
Australia	15	10	7	12	8	3	5	2	1	0	0	0	0	4	0	0	0	0	0	0	0	0	0	0	0	0	0	0	0	0
Austria	10	12	15	5	2	8	0	0	0	7	0	0	4	0	0	0	0	0	0	1	0	0	0	0	0	0	0	0	0	3
Bahrain	7	10	2	15	4	12	8	0	0	0	0	3	0	0	0	5	0	0	0	0	0	0	0	0	0	0	0	1	0	0
Belarus	15	12	0	8	10	2	3	5	0	0	0	0	4	0	7	0	0	0	0	0	0	0	0	0	0	1	0	0	0	0
Belgium	12	10	7	2	8	15	1	0	4	5	3	0	0	0	0	0	0	0	0	0	0	0	0	0	0	0	0	0	0	0
Benin	15	8	2	5	7	12	10	0	4	0	0	0	0	0	0	0	0	0	0	3	1	0	0	0	0	0	0	0	0	0
Bolivia	15	10	8	7	12	5	0	2	0	0	0	4	0	3	0	0	0	0	0	1	0	0	0	0	0	0	0	0	0	0
Bosnia and Herzegovina	15	10	3	8	12	0	7	5	0	1	0	2	4	0	0	0	0	0	0	0	0	0	0	0	0	0	0	0	0	0
Brazil	7	15	10	5	12	0	4	2	0	0	0	8	0	0	0	3	0	0	0	0	0	1	0	0	0	0	0	0	0	0
Bulgaria	15	8	1	3	2	0	5	12	7	10	0	4	0	0	0	0	0	0	0	0	0	0	0	0	0	0	0	0	0	0
Burkina Faso	15	10	8	1	7	12	2	4	3	0	0	0	0	5	0	0	0	0	0	0	0	0	0	0	0	0	0	0	0	0
Cameroon	15	8	4	0	3	10	5	0	12	7	0	0	0	0	0	0	0	0	0	0	2	0	0	0	0	0	0	0	0	1
Canada	15	12	10	8	7	1	4	3	0	5	0	2	0	0	0	0	0	0	0	0	0	0	0	0	0	0	0	0	0	0
Cape Verde	15	10	5	0	12	0	4	0	0	7	3	0	0	2	0	8	0	0	1	0	0	0	0	0	0	0	0	0	0	0
Chile	10	12	15	7	0	0	2	5	8	1	0	0	0	0	4	0	0	0	0	0	0	3	0	0	0	0	0	0	0	0
China	15	12	10	7	8	3	0	1	5	0	4	0	0	0	0	0	0	0	0	2	0	0	0	0	0	0	0	0	0	0
Colombia	15	10	12	5	8	0	3	1	7	0	4	0	0	0	0	0	2	0	0	0	0	0	0	0	0	0	0	0	0	0
Costa Rica	15	12	8	10	7	5	4	1	0	0	0	0	0	0	2	0	3	0	0	0	0	0	0	0	0	0	0	0	0	0
Croatia	10	7	15	4	0	0	2	12	0	0	0	8	3	0	1	0	0	0	5	0	0	0	0	0	0	0	0	0	0	0
Curacao	15	10	5	8	12	0	7	0	3	2	4	0	0	0	0	0	0	0	0	0	0	0	0	1	0	0	0	0	0	0
Czechia	15	10	7	2	4	12	5	8	0	0	0	3	1	0	0	0	0	0	0	0	0	0	0	0	0	0	0	0	0	0
Denmark	15	12	8	10	7	5	0	2	3	0	0	4	1	0	0	0	0	0	0	0	0	0	0	0	0	0	0	0	0	0
DR Congo	15	5	1	3	8	12	7	2	0	0	0	0	4	10	0	0	0	0	0	0	0	0	0	0	0	0	0	0	0	0
Ecuador	15	12	7	10	3	0	1	5	0	0	2	4	8	0	0	0	0	0	0	0	0	0	0	0	0	0	0	0	0	0
Egypt	12	2	0	15	4	8	10	7	0	0	0	0	0	0	1	0	3	0	0	0	0	0	5	0	0	0	0	0	0	0
El Salvador	7	12	15	10	8	4	0	0	1	5	0	0	3	0	0	0	2	0	0	0	0	0	0	0	0	0	0	0	0	0
England	15	12	10	8	7	5	4	0	0	3	0	0	2	0	0	0	0	1	0	0	0	0	0	0	0	0	0	0	0	0
Equatorial Guinea	12	15	0	0	8	5	0	7	1	4	10	0	0	3	0	0	0	0	0	0	0	0	0	2	0	0	0	0	0	0
Finland	15	7	0	10	12	0	3	2	0	0	0	0	5	0	4	0	8	1	0	0	0	0	0	0	0	0	0	0	0	0
France	15	12	5	4	8	10	2	0	7	1	0	0	3	0	0	0	0	0	0	0	0	0	0	0	0	0	0	0	0	0
Gabon	12	10	8	5	4	15	3	7	0	0	1	0	2	0	0	0	0	0	0	0	0	0	0	0	0	0	0	0	0	0
Georgia	12	10	7	0	4	8	3	1	2	5	0	15	0	0	0	0	0	0	0	0	0	0	0	0	0	0	0	0	0	0
Germany	12	15	7	10	8	0	5	0	0	3	0	0	2	0	4	0	0	0	0	0	0	0	0	0	0	0	0	0	1	0
Ghana	15	12	5	8	7	10	4	0	3	0	0	0	0	1	2	0	0	0	0	0	0	0	0	0	0	0	0	0	0	0
Greece	15	8	12	3	0	7	0	4	10	0	0	0	0	0	0	0	0	2	0	5	0	0	0	0	1	0	0	0	0	0
Guatemala	15	12	5	1	7	0	8	10	0	0	0	0	0	0	0	3	0	0	0	2	0	0	4	0	0	0	0	0	0	0
Guinea	15	8	0	5	12	3	7	0	0	2	0	0	0	0	4	0	0	0	0	0	10	0	1	0	0	0	0	0	0	0
Haiti	15	5	7	8	12	3	0	0	10	4	2	0	0	0	0	0	1	0	0	0	0	0	0	0	0	0	0	0	0	0
Honduras	15	12	7	1	10	0	8	0	0	0	0	0	2	0	0	5	0	0	0	0	0	0	3	0	0	4	0	0	0	0
Hungary	15	8	0	12	0	2	7	0	10	0	0	3	0	0	4	0	1	0	0	0	0	5	0	0	0	0	0	0	0	0
Iceland	15	12	8	10	7	0	4	0	1	2	0	5	0	3	0	0	0	0	0	0	0	0	0	0	0	0	0	0	0	0
Iran	10	15	8	7	12	5	2	0	4	3	1	0	0	0	0	0	0	0	0	0	0	0	0	0	0	0	0	0	0	0
Iraq	15	5	3	7	10	12	8	2	0	0	0	0	0	0	1	0	0	0	0	0	0	0	0	0	0	0	4	0	0	0
Ireland	15	7	8	5	12	4	0	0	0	10	3	0	0	0	1	0	0	0	0	0	0	0	0	0	0	0	0	2	0	0
Israel	15	12	10	7	8	4	3	0	2	5	0	0	0	1	0	0	0	0	0	0	0	0	0	0	0	0	0	0	0	0
Italy	12	15	3	10	0	7	2	0	8	0	5	0	0	4	0	0	0	0	0	1	0	0	0	0	0	0	0	0	0	0
Ivory Coast	15	7	10	3	1	12	8	0	0	2	0	0	0	5	0	0	0	0	0	0	4	0	0	0	0	0	0	0	0	0
Jamaica	15	12	7	8	10	0	4	0	5	0	1	0	0	0	0	3	0	0	0	2	0	0	0	0	0	0	0	0	0	0
Japan	15	8	7	5	1	12	0	0	0	0	10	0	0	0	0	0	0	2	0	0	0	0	0	0	0	0	3	0	4	0
Jordan	10	12	3	15	4	5	7	8	0	0	0	0	2	0	0	0	0	0	0	1	0	0	0	0	0	0	0	0	0	0
Kosovo	15	10	12	7	0	0	5	8	0	0	2	4	0	0	0	3	0	0	0	0	0	0	1	0	0	0	0	0	0	0
Luxembourg	15	12	7	8	10	5	0	0	1	0	0	3	0	0	0	0	0	0	2	4	0	0	0	0	0	0	0	0	0	0
Mali	15	12	0	10	4	7	8	3	0	0	0	0	5	0	0	0	0	0	0	2	1	0	0	0	0	0	0	0	0	0
Mexico	15	10	12	0	8	0	0	3	0	2	5	0	0	4	0	0	0	0	1	0	0	0	0	0	7	0	0	0	0	0
Montenegro	15	8	2	5	10	12	0	4	7	0	0	0	3	0	0	0	0	1	0	0	0	0	0	0	0	0	0	0	0	0
Morocco	10	12	7	8	4	15	5	3	0	0	0	0	0	0	0	0	0	0	0	1	2	0	0	0	0	0	0	0	0	0
Mozambique	7	10	2	12	0	0	15	0	1	5	0	0	3	0	0	8	0	0	0	0	0	0	0	0	0	4	0	0	0	0
Netherlands	12	15	8	10	7	0	2	0	0	0	0	5	0	0	3	0	0	0	0	0	0	0	0	4	0	0	0	1	0	0
New Zealand	15	10	8	12	7	0	5	4	1	2	0	3	0	0	0	0	0	0	0	0	0	0	0	0	0	0	0	0	0	0
Nigeria	15	12	7	10	0	8	0	0	2	0	0	5	0	0	1	0	3	0	0	0	4	0	0	0	0	0	0	0	0	0
North Macedonia	15	12	8	7	10	0	5	4	0	0	1	0	0	3	0	0	0	0	0	0	0	0	0	2	0	0	0	0	0	0
Northern Ireland	15	10	8	12	5	1	0	0	0	4	0	7	0	0	0	0	0	2	0	0	0	0	0	0	0	0	0	3	0	0
Norway	15	12	10	8	7	4	0	5	0	1	0	2	0	0	0	0	0	0	0	0	0	0	0	0	3	0	0	0	0	0
Oman	15	8	0	12	7	10	5	0	0	0	2	0	4	0	0	3	0	0	0	0	0	0	0	0	0	1	0	0	0	0
Palestine	15	12	10	7	5	8	2	0	0	1	0	0	0	0	4	0	0	0	0	0	0	0	0	0	0	0	3	0	0	0
Panama	15	12	8	0	7	0	10	0	0	0	0	0	3	0	2	1	4	0	5	0	0	0	0	0	0	0	0	0	0	0
Paraguay	15	12	8	1	7	0	10	0	0	0	5	0	0	0	0	4	0	0	0	3	0	2	0	0	0	0	0	0	0	0
Peru	15	8	12	2	10	5	7	4	0	0	3	0	0	0	0	0	0	0	0	0	0	0	1	0	0	0	0	0	0	0
Poland	12	15	4	8	10	0	5	1	0	2	0	0	0	3	0	0	7	0	0	0	0	0	0	0	0	0	0	0	0	0
Portugal	15	10	12	8	3	0	2	5	0	7	0	0	1	0	0	0	0	0	0	0	0	0	0	4	0	0	0	0	0	0
Qatar	15	8	10	0	0	12	7	0	0	5	0	1	3	0	0	0	0	0	0	0	0	0	2	0	0	4	0	0	0	0
Romania	15	12	4	0	7	10	1	0	0	8	2	0	0	5	0	0	3	0	0	0	0	0	0	0	0	0	0	0	0	0
Russia	15	12	8	4	5	3	2	0	10	7	0	0	0	0	1	0	0	0	0	0	0	0	0	0	0	0	0	0	0	0
Saudi Arabia	15	12	8	4	5	10	2	1	0	3	7	0	0	0	0	0	0	0	0	0	0	0	0	0	0	0	0	0	0	0
Scotland	12	8	4	10	0	0	0	0	1	0	0	0	0	0	0	0	0	15	0	2	0	5	0	7	0	0	3	0	0	0
Senegal	15	12	5	7	8	10	4	1	0	0	3	0	0	0	0	0	0	0	0	2	0	0	0	0	0	0	0	0	0	0
Serbia	15	10	7	5	0	0	12	0	0	0	0	0	3	8	0	2	0	0	0	1	0	0	0	0	0	4	0	0	0	0
Slovakia	15	7	8	10	12	5	2	0	4	3	0	1	0	0	0	0	0	0	0	0	0	0	0	0	0	0	0	0	0	0
Slovenia	15	10	0	12	2	8	7	0	0	0	0	1	0	0	0	3	0	5	0	4	0	0	0	0	0	0	0	0	0	0
South Africa	12	10	8	15	5	7	4	1	0	0	0	0	2	3	0	0	0	0	0	0	0	0	0	0	0	0	0	0	0	0
South Korea	15	12	10	7	0	8	4	0	0	2	0	1	5	0	0	0	0	3	0	0	0	0	0	0	0	0	0	0	0	0
Spain	10	15	12	8	7	0	3	5	0	4	2	0	0	0	0	0	0	0	0	0	0	0	0	0	1	0	0	0	0	0
Sweden	15	7	8	12	10	3	4	0	2	0	0	0	5	0	0	0	0	1	0	0	0	0	0	0	0	0	0	0	0	0
Switzerland	15	10	12	0	3	8	1	2	0	4	0	0	0	0	7	0	0	0	5	0	0	0	0	0	0	0	0	0	0	0
Syria	15	8	1	10	12	3	2	0	4	0	0	0	5	0	0	0	0	7	0	0	0	0	0	0	0	0	0	0	0	0
Tunisia	12	15	4	7	5	10	3	0	0	0	8	0	2	0	0	0	0	0	0	0	1	0	0	0	0	0	0	0	0	0
Turkey	15	12	8	10	7	5	0	0	0	4	0	0	3	2	0	0	0	1	0	0	0	0	0	0	0	0	0	0	0	0
Uganda	15	5	12	0	7	0	4	3	0	0	0	0	2	0	1	0	8	0	10	0	0	0	0	0	0	0	0	0	0	0
Ukraine	12	10	15	7	0	1	0	2	0	0	0	3	0	0	0	0	0	4	5	0	0	0	0	0	8	0	0	0	0	0
United Arab Emirates	7	15	10	4	5	12	1	2	3	0	0	8	0	0	0	0	0	0	0	0	0	0	0	0	0	0	0	0	0	0
United States	15	12	8	10	7	5	3	1	0	0	0	0	4	2	0	0	0	0	0	0	0	0	0	0	0	0	0	0	0	0
Uruguay	15	12	10	1	5	7	0	0	3	2	8	4	0	0	0	0	0	0	0	0	0	0	0	0	0	0	0	0	0	0
Uzbekistan	15	12	10	7	8	0	4	2	0	3	5	0	0	0	1	0	0	0	0	0	0	0	0	0	0	0	0	0	0	0
Venezuela	12	10	15	7	8	2	5	4	0	0	1	0	3	0	0	0	0	0	0	0	0	0	0	0	0	0	0	0	0	0
Wales	15	12	8	10	7	3	2	1	0	4	0	5	0	0	0	0	0	0	0	0	0	0	0	0	0	0	0	0	0	0
Zambia	15	12	0	7	3	10	8	2	0	0	0	5	1	0	0	0	0	0	0	0	0	0	4	0	0	0	0	0	0	0

== Ballon d'Or Féminin ==
Thirty players were nominated for the 2025 Ballon d'Or Fémenin.

2025 Ballon d'Or Fémenin
Rank	Player	Nationality	Position	Club(s)	Points
1	Aitana Bonmatí	Spain	Midfielder	(Spain) Barcelona	506
2	Mariona Caldentey	Spain	Forward	(England) Arsenal	478
3	Alessia Russo	England	Forward	(England) Arsenal	420
4	Alexia Putellas	Spain	Midfielder	(Spain) Barcelona	388
5	Chloe Kelly	England	Forward	(England) Manchester City (England) Arsenal	233
6	Patricia Guijarro	Spain	Midfielder	(Spain) Barcelona	157
7	Leah Williamson	England	Defender	(England) Arsenal	151
8	Ewa Pajor	Poland	Forward	(Spain) Barcelona	139
9	Lucy Bronze	England	Defender	(England) Chelsea	135
10	Hannah Hampton	England	Goalkeeper	(England) Chelsea	122
11	Clàudia Pina	Spain	Forward	(Spain) Barcelona	113
12	Marta	Brazil	Forward	(United States) Orlando Pride	106
13	Caroline Graham Hansen	Norway	Forward	(Spain) Barcelona	92
14	Barbra Banda	Zambia	Forward	(United States) Orlando Pride	47
15	Sandy Baltimore	France	Forward	(England) Chelsea	42
16	Cristiana Girelli	Italy	Forward	(Italy) Juventus	40
17	Temwa Chawinga	Malawi	Forward	(United States) Kansas City Current	29
18	Melchie Dumornay	Haiti	Midfielder	(France) Lyon	27
19	Klara Bühl	Germany	Forward	(Germany) Bayern Munich	25
20	Pernille Harder	Denmark	Forward	(Germany) Bayern Munich	20
21	Amanda Gutierres	Brazil	Forward	(Brazil) Palmeiras	20
22	Esther González	Spain	Forward	(United States) Gotham FC	19
23	Johanna Rytting Kaneryd	Sweden	Midfielder	(England) Chelsea	11
24	Sofia Cantore	Italy	Forward	(Italy) Juventus	9
25	Emily Fox	United States	Defender	(England) Arsenal	7
26	Lindsey Heaps	United States	Midfielder	(France) Lyon	5
27	Clara Mateo	France	Forward	(France) Paris FC	4
27	Frida Maanum	Norway	Midfielder	(England) Arsenal	4
29	Steph Catley	Australia	Defender	(England) Arsenal	1
30	Caroline Weir	Scotland	Midfielder	(Spain) Real Madrid	0

== Men's Kopa Trophy ==
Ten players were nominated for the 2025 Men's Kopa Trophy.

2025 Men's Kopa Trophy ranking
Rank	Player	Nationality	Position	Club(s)	Points
1	Lamine Yamal	Spain	Forward	(Spain) Barcelona	124
2	Désiré Doué	France	Midfielder	(France) Paris Saint-Germain	72
3	João Neves	Portugal	Midfielder	(France) Paris Saint-Germain	23
4	Estêvão	Brazil	Forward	(Brazil) Palmeiras	9
5	Kenan Yıldız	Turkey	Forward	(Italy) Juventus	6
6	Dean Huijsen	Spain	Defender	(England) Bournemouth (Spain) Real Madrid	5
7	Pau Cubarsí	Spain	Defender	(Spain) Barcelona	3
8	Rodrigo Mora	Portugal	Forward	(Portugal) Porto	1
9	Ayyoub Bouaddi	France	Midfielder	(France) Lille	0
9	Myles Lewis-Skelly	England	Midfielder	(England) Arsenal	0

== Women's Kopa Trophy ==
Five players were nominated for the 2025 Women's Kopa Trophy.

2025 Women's Kopa Trophy ranking
Rank	Player	Nationality	Position	Club(s)	Points
1	Vicky López	Spain	Midfielder	(Spain) Barcelona	15
2	Linda Caicedo	Colombia	Forward	(Spain) Real Madrid	12
3	Wieke Kaptein	Netherlands	Midfielder	(England) Chelsea	8
4	Michelle Agyemang	England	Forward	(England) Brighton & Hove Albion	5
5	Claudia Martínez	Paraguay	Forward	(Paraguay) Olimpia	2

== Men's Yashin Trophy ==
Ten goalkeepers were nominated for the 2025 Men's Yashin Trophy.

2025 Men's Yashin Trophy ranking
Rank	Player	Nationality	Club(s)	Points
1	Gianluigi Donnarumma	Italy	(France) Paris Saint-Germain	486
2	Alisson	Brazil	(England) Liverpool	120
3	Yann Sommer	Switzerland	(Italy) Inter Milan	112
4	Thibaut Courtois	Belgium	(Spain) Real Madrid	69
5	Yassine Bounou	Morocco	(Saudi Arabia) Al-Hilal	48
6	David Raya	Spain	(England) Arsenal	31
7	Jan Oblak	Slovenia	(Spain) Atlético Madrid	31
8	Emiliano Martínez	Argentina	(England) Aston Villa	7
9	Lucas Chevalier	France	(France) Lille	5
10	Matz Sels	Belgium	(England) Nottingham Forest	4

== Women's Yashin Trophy ==
Five goalkeepers were nominated for the 2025 Women's Yashin Trophy.

2025 Women's Yashin Trophy ranking
Rank	Player	Nationality	Club(s)	Points
1	Hannah Hampton	England	(England) Chelsea	88
2	Ann-Katrin Berger	Germany	(United States) Gotham FC	26
3	Cata Coll	Spain	(Spain) Barcelona	25
4	Chiamaka Nnadozie	Nigeria	(France) Paris FC	6
5	Daphne van Domselaar	Netherlands	(England) Arsenal	5

== Gerd Müller Trophy ==
The nominees for the award were announced on 7 August 2025. The award is given to player who scored the most goals in a calendar year. It is named after German legend Gerd Müller.

2025 Gerd Müller Trophy ranking - Men
Rank	Player	Nationality	Position	Club	Goals
1	Viktor Gyökeres	Sweden	Forward	(Portugal) Sporting CP	63
2	Harry Kane	England	Forward	(Germany) Bayern Munich	48
3	Kylian Mbappé	France	Forward	(Spain) Real Madrid	46
4	Erling Haaland	Norway	Forward	(England) Manchester City	45
5	Robert Lewandowski	Poland	Forward	(Spain) Barcelona	44

2025 Gerd Müller Trophy ranking - Women
Rank	Player	Nationality	Position	Club	Goals
1	Ewa Pajor	Poland	Forward	(Spain) Barcelona	52
2	Clàudia Pina	Spain	Forward	(Spain) Barcelona	33
3	Esther González	Spain	Forward	(United States) Gotham FC	29
4	Cristiana Girelli	Italy	Forward	(Italy) Juventus	28
5	Pernille Harder	Denmark	Forward	(Germany) Bayern Munich	27
5	Alexia Putellas	Spain	Forward	(Spain) Barcelona	27

== Sócrates Award ==
The nominees for the award were announced on 7 August 2025. The Sócrates Award is an association football award presented to the best humanitarian work by a footballer worldwide during a joint ceremony with the Ballon d'Or. The award is presented by France Football in collaboration with Peace and Sport and is named after late Brazilian footballer Sócrates, who co-founded the Corinthians Democracy movement, in opposition to the ruling military dictatorship in Brazil during the 1980s.

2025 Sócrates Award winner
Winner	Nationality
Xana Foundation	Spain

== Men's Club of the Year ==
2025 Men's Club of the Year ranking
Rank	Club	Total	Ballon d'Or	Points
1	(France) Paris Saint-Germain	9	Ousmane Dembélé (FRA); Gianluigi Donnarumma (ITA); Désiré Doué (FRA); Achraf Hakimi (MAR); Khvicha Kvaratskhelia (GEO); Nuno Mendes (POR); João Neves (POR); Fabián Ruiz (ESP); Vitinha (POR)	199
2	(Spain) Barcelona	4	Lamine Yamal (ESP); Raphinha (BRA); Pedri (ESP); Robert Lewandowski (POL)	41
3	(England) Chelsea	1	Cole Palmer (ENG)	32
4	(England) Liverpool	3	Mohamed Salah (EGY); Alexis Mac Allister (ARG); Virgil van Dijk (NED)	26
5	(Brazil) Botafogo	0		2

== Women's Club of the Year ==
2025 Women's Club of the Year ranking
Rank	Club	Total	Ballon d'Or	Points
1	(England) Arsenal	7	Mariona Caldentey (ESP); Steph Catley (AUS); Emily Fox (USA); Chloe Kelly (ENG); Frida Maanum (NOR); Alessia Russo (ENG); Leah Williamson (ENG)	75
2	(Spain) Barcelona	6	Aitana Bonmatí (ESP); Alexia Putellas (ESP); Patricia Guijarro (ESP); Ewa Pajor (POL); Clàudia Pina (ESP); Caroline Graham Hansen (NOR)	51
3	(England) Chelsea	4	Lucy Bronze (ENG); Hannah Hampton (ENG); Sandy Baltimore (FRA); Johanna Rytting Kaneryd (SWE)	14
4	(United States) Orlando Pride	2	Marta (BRA); Barbra Banda (ZAM)	8
5	(France) Lyon	2	Melchie Dumornay (HAI); Lindsey Heaps (USA)	2

== Men's Coach of the Year ==
Five coaches were nominated for the 2025 Men's Johan Cruyff Trophy.

2025 Men's Coach of the Year Award
Rank	Coach	Nationality	Team(s)	Points
1	Luis Enrique	Spain	(France) Paris Saint-Germain	118
2	Hansi Flick	Germany	(Spain) Barcelona	44
3	Enzo Maresca	Italy	(England) Chelsea	27
4	Arne Slot	Netherlands	(England) Liverpool	26
5	Antonio Conte	Italy	(Italy) Napoli	6

== Women's Coach of the Year ==
Five coaches were nominated for the 2025 Women's Johan Cruyff Trophy.

2025 Women's Coach of the Year Award
Rank	Coach	Nationality	Team(s)	Points
1	Sarina Wiegman	Netherlands	England	84
2	Renée Slegers	Netherlands	(England) Arsenal	46
3	Sonia Bompastor	France	(England) Chelsea	15
4	Arthur Elias	Brazil	Brazil	5
5	Justine Madugu	Nigeria	Nigeria	0
