= CP Sarrià =

Spanish association football club

- Full name: Centre Parroquial de Sarrià
- Nickname: Cepe
- Founded: 1952
- Ground: Municipal de Can Caralleu
- Capacity: 300
- Chairman: Josep Calderó
- Manager: Erec Irisarri
- League: Tercera Catalana – Group 9
- 2025–26: Segona Catalana – Group 3, 15th of 16 (relegated)
Home colours	Away colours

Centre Parroquial de Sarrià is the football section of Sant Vicenç de Sarrià Parish Center, created in 1952. It is currently the most veteran and representative football entity in the old town of Sarrià, the current district of Barcelona. The first team plays in Tercera Catalana – Group 9. It has around 24 base teams of football.

The most outstanding sporting milestone of the team was the 30 August 2014, with the dispute of final of Copa Catalunya Amateur against CE Manresa, but lost 3–0.

== History ==
The vicar of Sant Vicenç de Sarrià Parish Center proposed to the future president of the football section, Josep Calderó (Pitu), to create a children's football team. Then in October 1952 the Catalan Football Federation approved the statutes of the club as a football section of Parish Center.

The team has always played in territorial categories and has not had the power of other neighborhood clubs in the city, as it always lived in the shadow of the RCD Espanyol when it played in the Sarrià Stadium until 1997.

The club has only one president since the foundation: Josep Calderó Calopa, who has held office since he was 17 years old.

== Stadium ==
The team plays the matches at Municipal de Can Caralleu. He has enjoyed artificial turf since 1999 and all his grassroots football teams also play there.

== Season to season ==
Season	Tier	Division	Place	Copa del Rey
1973–74	9	Reg. Afic.	3rd	
1974–75	9	Reg. Afic.	3rd	
1975–76	7	3ª Reg.	1st	
1976–77	6	2ª Reg.	7th	
1977–78	7	2ª Reg.	20th	
1978–79	8	3ª Reg.	10th	
1979–80	8	3ª Reg.	11th	
1980–81	8	3ª Reg.	3rd	
1981–82	8	3ª Reg.		
1982–83	8	3ª Reg.		
1983–84	8	3ª Reg.		
1984–85	7	2ª Reg.	4th	
1985–86	8	3ª Reg.	17th	
1986–87	8	3ª Reg.	8th	
1987–88	8	3ª Reg.	4th	
1988–89	8	3ª Reg.	1st	
1989–90	7	2ª Reg.	12th	
1990–91	7	2ª Reg.	15th	
1991–92	8	2ª Terr.	13th	
1992–93	8	2ª Terr.	15th	

Season	Tier	Division	Place	Copa del Rey
1993–94	8	2ª Terr.	17th	
1994–95	9	3ª Terr.	3rd	
1995–96	9	3ª Terr.	6th	
1996–97	9	3ª Terr.	3rd	
1997–98	9	3ª Terr.	4th	
1998–99	9	3ª Terr.	1st	
1999–2000	8	2ª Terr.	10th	
2000–01	8	2ª Terr.	6th	
2001–02	8	2ª Terr.	5th	
2002–03	8	2ª Terr.	8th	
2003–04	8	2ª Terr.	16th	
2004–05	9	3ª Terr.	(R)	
2005–06	9	3ª Terr.	3rd	
2006–07	9	3ª Terr.	7th	
2007–08	9	3ª Terr.	2nd	
2008–09	8	2ª Terr.	9th	
2009–10	8	2ª Terr.	6th	
2010–11	8	2ª Terr.	6th	
2011–12	7	3ª Cat.	4th	
2012–13	7	3ª Cat.	2nd	

Season	Tier	Division	Place	Copa del Rey
2013–14	7	3ª Cat.	1st	
2014–15	6	2ª Cat.	16th	
2015–16	7	3ª Cat.	1st	
2016–17	6	2ª Cat.	9th	
2017–18	6	2ª Cat.	7th	
2018–19	6	2ª Cat.	8th	
2019–20	6	2ª Cat.	15th	
2020–21	6	2ª Cat.	2nd	
2021–22	7	2ª Cat.	1st	
2022–23	6	1ª Cat.	13th	
2023–24	7	1ª Cat.	15th	
2024–25	8	2ª Cat.	5th	
2025–26	8	2ª Cat.	15th	
2026–27	9	3ª Cat.		

== Honours ==
- Divisiones Regionales de Fútbol in Catalonia
  - Winners (6): 1975–76, 1988–89, 1998–99, 2013–14, 2015–16, 2021–22
  - Runners-up (3): 2007–08, 2012–13, 2020–21
- Copa Catalunya Amateur
  - Runners-up (1): 2014
