= João Neves =

Portuguese footballer (born 2004)

- Neves with Portugal in 2026

Personal information
- Full name: João Pedro Gonçalves Neves
- Date of birth: 27 September 2004 (age 22)
- Place of birth: Tavira, Portugal
- Height: 1.74 m (5 ft 9 in)
- Position: Midfielder

Team information
- Current team: Paris Saint-Germain
- Number: 87

Youth career
- 2011–2012: Casa Benfica Tavira
- 2012–2016: CB Albufeira
- 2016–2022: Benfica

Senior career*
Years	Team	Apps	(Gls)
2022–2023	Benfica B	11	(0)
2022–2024	Benfica	50	(4)
2024–	Paris Saint-Germain	59	(8)

International career^{‡}
2019–2021	Portugal U15	4	(0)
2021–2023	Portugal U19	17	(3)
2022–2023	Portugal U21	6	(1)
2023–	Portugal	32	(4)
Medal record
Men's football
Representing Portugal
UEFA Nations League
Winner	2025 Germany
- * Club domestic league appearances and goals as of 21:26, 21 November 2026 (UTC) ‡ National team caps and goals as of 23:03, 17 November 2026 (UTC)

João Pedro Gonçalves Neves (Portuguese pronunciation: [ʒuˈɐ̃w̃ ˈnɛvɨʃ]; born 27 September 2004) is a Portuguese professional footballer who plays as a midfielder for Ligue 1 club Paris Saint-Germain and the Portugal national team. Primarily a central midfielder, Neves is also able to play as a defensive midfielder and occasionally a right-back. He is regarded as one of the best young players in the world.

Coming through Benfica's youth system, Neves impressed during his time with the reserve side, winning the UEFA Youth League in 2021–22, being instrumental part of Benfica's first European trophy in 60 years. He was subsequently promoted to the first-team, making his professional debut at age 18, where he helped Benfica win the league title in his first season with the side. In August 2024, Neves joined Paris Saint-Germain for a transfer fee of €60 million, being a prominent player as the club won their first UEFA Champions League titles back-to-back in 2025 and 2026, with the former being part of a continental treble.

Neves is a former Portugal youth international, representing his country at various levels. He made his senior international debut in 2023, representing Portugal at the UEFA Euro 2024 and 2026 FIFA World Cup. He also won the UEFA Nations League in 2025.

== Club career ==
=== Early career ===
Born in Tavira, Neves began his youth career with hometown club Casa Benfica Tavira, one of Benfica's feeder clubs, he then spent four seasons in Benfica's development centre in Algarve, before moving to Benfica's main academy in 2016. Neves signed his first professional contract with S.L Benfica in December 2020.

=== Benfica ===
==== 2022–23: Early career and first-team breakthrough ====
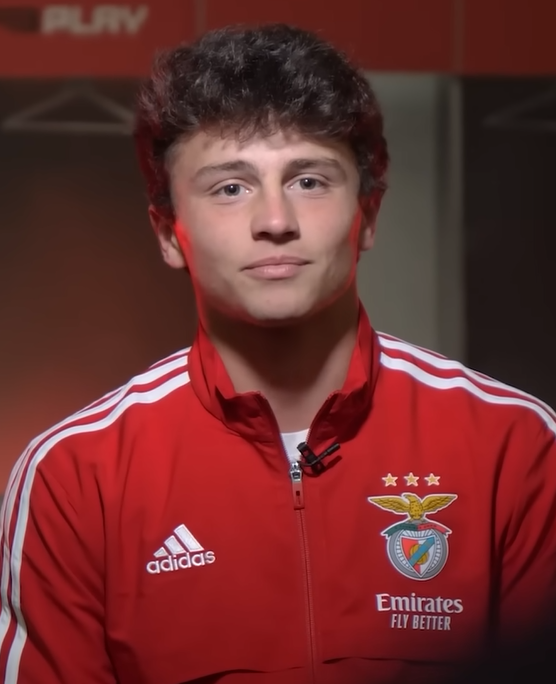
Neves with Benfica in 2023

Neves was a part of the Benfica U19 team which topped their 2021–22 UEFA Youth League group against Dynamo Kyiv, Barcelona, and Bayern Munich, and eventually won the tournament. He made his professional debut with Benfica B in a 1–1 LigaPro draw to Académico de Viseu on 6 August 2022. On 24 August, Neves started in Benfica's 1–0 against Peñarol at the 2022 Under-20 Intercontinental Cup.

During the league break to facilitate the 2022 FIFA World Cup, he made his unofficial debut for Benfica's first team on 11 December 2022, in a closed-doors friendly against Sevilla. During this time, Benfica's first team manager Roger Schmidt invited him to participate in several first-team training sessions, impressing him with his ability, dedication and maturity on the ball. On 21 December, Neves signed a contract extension with Benfica until 2028. He made his debut for the senior team on the first day of 2023, coming on late as a substitute in the 3–0 defeat to Braga in the Primeira Liga. On 7 March, Neves made his UEFA Champions League debut, replacing João Mário in the 74th minute and providing an assist on Benfica's fifth goal, in their 5–1 home win against Club Brugge in the second leg of the Champions League round-of-16.

In the final months of the season, following the departure of Enzo Fernández, Neves eventually earned a place in the starting eleven over Florentino Luís, most notably scoring his first goal for the club on 21 May against crosstown rivals Sporting CP in the Lisbon derby, securing his side a draw after they were down by two goals at half-time. He would make 17 league appearances for Benfica as they sealed their first league title in four years, following a 3–0 home win over Santa Clara, on the final day of the league campaign.

==== 2023–24: Primeira Liga Team of Year and departure ====
Neves started the 2023–24 season, on 9 August, being named man of the match in the 2–0 victory over Porto in the Supertaça Cândido de Oliveira. On 12 November, Neves scored the 94th minute equalizer in an eventual 2–1 league victory over rivals Sporting CP, at the Estádio da Luz; while also receiving the Man of the Match award. Over the following months, Neves established himself as one of the best midfielders in Portugal, being voted as the Primeira Liga's Midfielder of the Month between the months September and December, a feat which he repeated in February and March 2024, with only Braga's Rodrigo Zalazar winning it in January. At the end of the season, despite Benfica finishing as runners-up in the league, Neves was named in the Team of the Year.

In July 2024, it was reported that Ligue 1 club Paris Saint-Germain (PSG) had made an initial bid for Neves of €70 million (£59 million). Their offer was reportedly rejected and negotiations continued, with Benfica being adamant that he would not be sold for less than his €120 million release clause, despite PSG agreeing personal terms with Neves. Shortly after, Benfica's President Rui Costa denied that he "would only leave for his release clause and therefore, those claims were false", but confirmed the club had received a bid for him, with negotiations between them and a club still proceeding. On 2 August, Rui Costa confirmed Neves' departure to Paris Saint-Germain, stating that he could not refuse a €70 million offer for him, leading Benfica to confirm his transfer three days later.

=== Paris Saint-Germain ===
On 5 August 2024, Neves signed a five-year contract with Paris Saint-Germain, for a €59.9 million fee plus €10 million in potential add-ons, and Renato Sanches moving in the other direction on a loan deal.

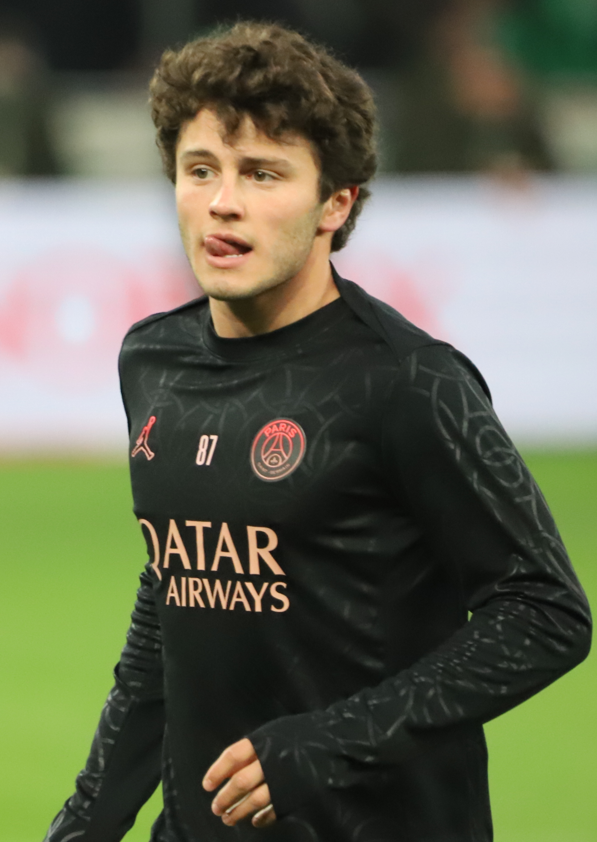
Neves playing for Paris Saint-Germain during the 2024–25 season

On 16 August, Neves made his official debut in a 4–1 win over Le Havre, coming on as a substitute and assisting Ousmane Dembélé and Bradley Barcola's goals. On 23 August, he again provided two assists, one each for Barcola and Marco Asensio, in a 6–0 victory over Montpellier. In the process, he set the record for the most assists (four) in his first two Ligue 1 matches, surpassing Neymar's previous record of three assists. On 27 October, Neves scored his first goal for the club, netting the opening goal in a 3–0 win at away over Le Classique rivals Marseille.

On 22 January 2025, Neves was elected the player of the match in a 4–2 Champions League victory over Manchester City. He won seven out of seven tackles, completed 51 out of 61 passes, and registered seven shots, eventually scoring the goal that completed PSG's comeback and put them up 3–2. Having helped PSG secure their 13th Ligue 1 title, he was one of the nominees for the Ligue 1 Young Player of the Year, finishing as runner-up and was included in the Ligue 1 Team of the Season, while also helping the club secure their first Champions League title and completing a continental treble.

On 29 June, Neves scored his first career brace in a 4–0 win over Inter Miami in the round of 16 of the 2025 FIFA Club World Cup, becoming the first non-French player to score a brace for PSG in an international club competition match since Lionel Messi in October 2022. On 13 July, in the final of the tournament, Neves was sent off for the first time in his career, for violent conduct, after pulling Marc Cucurella's hair, in a match, where PSG were defeated 3–0 by Chelsea.

On 30 August, Neves scored his first career hat-trick in a 6–3 away win against Toulouse, including two bicycle kicks. On 11 December, he made his 30th appearance in the UEFA Champions League in a 0–0 away draw to Athletic Bilbao, becoming the youngest Portuguese player reach 30 appearances at the competition (21 years, and 14 days), breaking Cristiano Ronaldo's record. Neves was integral for the club and was a regular starter, as PSG secured their 12th league title in 14 years, and on 30 May, they won their second consecutive UEFA Champions League title against Arsenal in the final in a penalty shootout to retain the trophy.

== International career ==
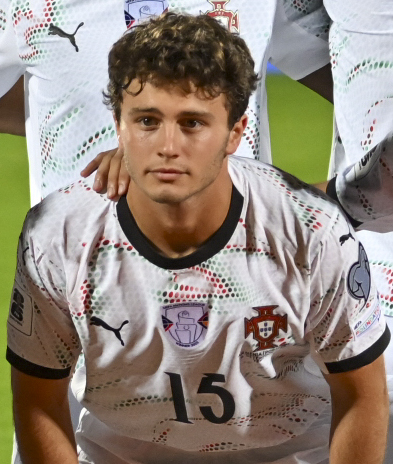
Neves with Portugal in 2025

Neves represented Portugal at under-15 and under-19, for a total of 21 caps. In June 2023, Neves took part in the 2023 UEFA European Under-21 Championship, scoring his first goal on 27 June in a 2–1 against Belgium. Portugal were eliminated from the tournament, on 2 July, after a 1–0 loss to England in the quarter-finals.

On 6 October 2023, Neves was called up to the Portuguese team for the first time for UEFA Euro 2024 qualifying matches against Slovakia and Bosnia and Herzegovina. He debuted the same year on 16 October, coming off the bench to replace Otávio in the 85th minute of a 5–0 away victory against Bosnia and Herzegovina.

On 21 May 2024, Neves was selected in the 26-man squad for the UEFA Euro 2024. With Portugal having secured qualification from their group, he debuted in the competition as a starter in a 2–0 loss against Georgia. Neves did not appear in the knockout stage as they were eliminated from the tournament in the quarter-finals after losing to France 5–3 in a penalty shootout.

On 20 May 2025, Neves was selected for Portugal's 2025 UEFA Nations League Finals squad. Deployed as a right-back, he and his team would go on to win the tournament 5–3 in a penalty shootout over rivals Spain. On 16 November, Neves scored his first senior international goals, netting in a hat-trick in a 9–1 victory over Armenia at Estádio do Dragão, as Portugal secured qualification for the World Cup.

On 19 May 2026, Neves was selected in the 26-man squad for the 2026 FIFA World Cup. On 17 June, he scored and earned Player of the Match award on his FIFA World Cup debut in a 1–1 draw against the Democratic Republic of Congo. As a result, he became the third youngest goalscorer in Portugal's World Cup history after Cristiano Ronaldo and Gonçalo Ramos.

== Style of play ==
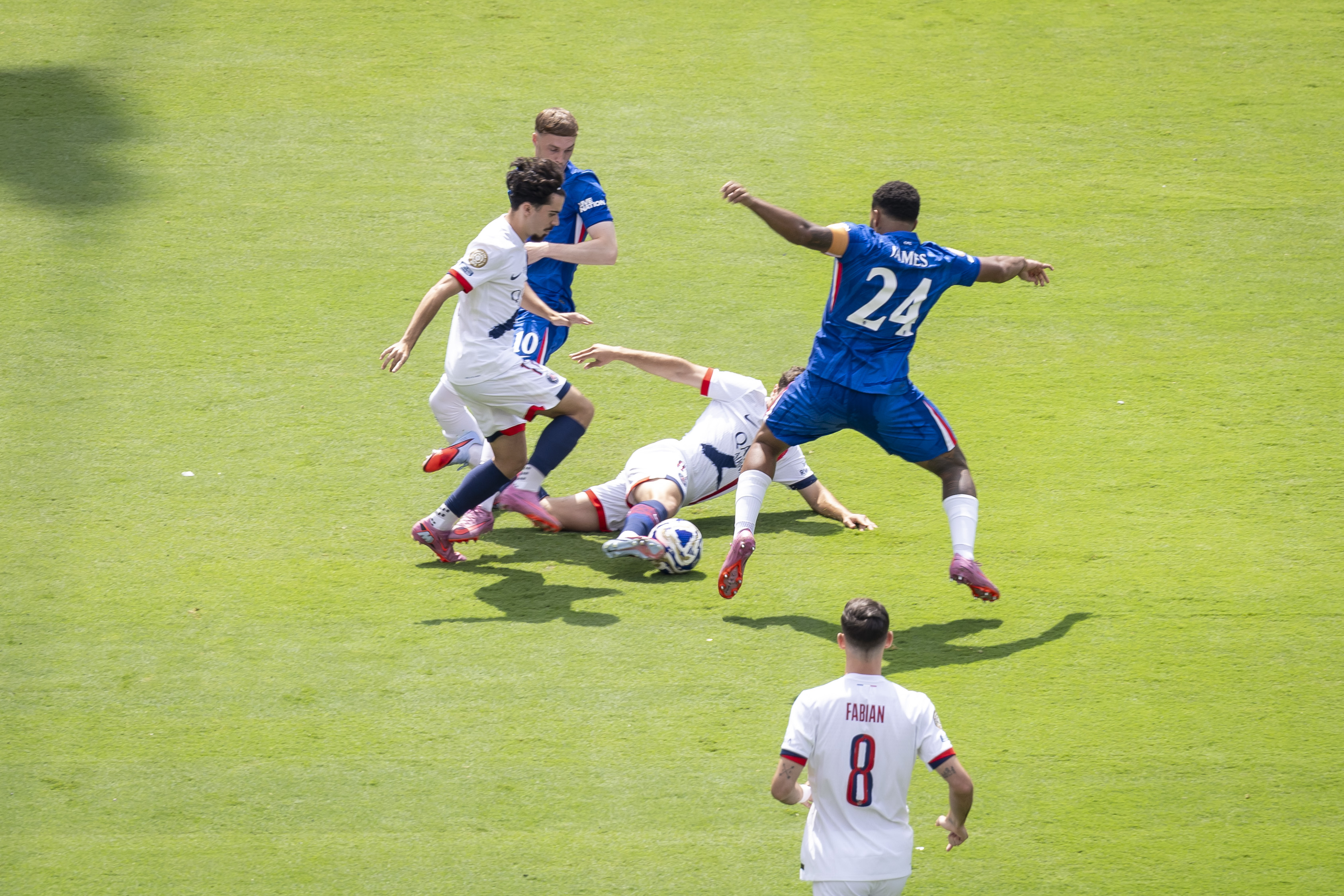
João Neves tackling Chelsea's Reece James during the FIFA Club World Cup final.

Neves is a central midfielder known for his passing, tackling skills, and close ball control. Regarded for his composure, stamina, and tactical maturity and a young age, he is capable of retaining possession under pressure in tight spaces. In addition, despite his relatively slight frame, statistics show that he wins a high percentile for aerial battles.

At Benfica, Neves played as a deep-lying playmaker, often in a double pivot within a 4–2–3–1 formation. In this role, he frequently dropped deep to receive the ball and keep possession. He uses his acceleration and agility over short distances to evade pressure from defenders and to create space from his marker without needing deceptive moves. Versatile in his positionings, Neves can drop between central defenders or full-backs to create numerical advantages. Defensively, he is noted for his counter-pressing, quickly engaging opponents to disrupt transitions when possession is lost.

== Personal life ==
His first idol in football was ex Benfica player Pablo Aimar. When he started watching European football, he also admired ex Manchester City players Kevin De Bruyne and David Silva.

His mother passed away from cancer at the age of 50 in February 2024, when Neves was 19.

Neves has been in a relationship with actress, influencer and fashion model Madalena Aragão since 2024.

== Career statistics ==
=== Club ===
As of match played 21 November 2026

Appearances and goals by club, season and competition
Club	Season	League			National cup (Note: Includes Taça de Portugal, Coupe de France)		League cup (Note: Includes Taça da Liga)		Europe		Other		Total	
Club	Season	Division	Apps	Goals	Apps	Goals	Apps	Goals	Apps	Goals	Apps	Goals	Apps	Goals
Benfica B	2022–23	Liga Portugal 2	11	0	—		—		—		—		11	0
Benfica	2022–23	Primeira Liga	17	1	0	0	0	0	3 (Note: Appearances in UEFA Champions League)	0	—		20	1
Benfica	2023–24	Primeira Liga	33	3	6	0	3	0	12 (Note: Six appearances in UEFA Champions League, six appearances in UEFA Europa League)	0	1 (Note: Appearance in Supertaça Cândido de Oliveira)	0	55	3
Benfica	Total		50	4	6	0	3	0	15	0	1	0	75	4
Paris Saint-Germain	2024–25	Ligue 1	29	3	5	1	—		17	1	8 (Note: One appearance in Trophée des Champions, seven appearances and two goals in FIFA Club World Cup)	2	59	7
Paris Saint-Germain	2025–26	Ligue 1	21	5	1	0	—		14	2	2 (Note: One appearance in FIFA Intercontinental Cup, one appearance in Trophée des Champions)	0	38	7
Paris Saint-Germain	2026–27	Ligue 1	9	0	0	0	—		3	1	1 (Note: Appearance in UEFA Super Cup)	0	13	1
Paris Saint-Germain	Total		59	8	6	1	—		34	4	11	2	110	15
Career total			120	12	12	1	3	0	49	4	12	2	196	19

=== International ===
As of match played 17 November 2026

Appearances and goals by national team and year
National team	Year	Apps	Goals
Portugal	2023	3	0
Portugal	2024	10	0
Portugal	2025	7	3
Portugal	2026	12	1
Total		32	4

Portugal score listed first, score column indicates score after each Neves goal.

List of international goals scored by João Neves
No.	Date	Venue	Cap	Opponent	Score	Result	Competition
1	16 November 2025	Estádio do Dragão, Porto, Portugal	20	Armenia	3–1	9–1	2026 FIFA World Cup qualification
2	16 November 2025	Estádio do Dragão, Porto, Portugal	20	Armenia	4–1	9–1	2026 FIFA World Cup qualification
3	16 November 2025	Estádio do Dragão, Porto, Portugal	20	Armenia	8–1	9–1	2026 FIFA World Cup qualification
4	17 June 2026	NRG Stadium, Houston, United States	23	DR Congo	1–0	1–1	2026 FIFA World Cup

== Honours ==
Benfica B

- Campeonato Nacional de Juniores: 2021–22
- UEFA Youth League: 2021–22
- Under-20 Intercontinental Cup: 2022

Benfica

- Primeira Liga: 2022–23
- Supertaça Cândido de Oliveira: 2023

Paris Saint-Germain

- Ligue 1: 2024–25, 2025–26
- Coupe de France: 2024–25
- Trophée des Champions: 2024, 2025
- UEFA Champions League: 2024–25, 2025–26
- UEFA Super Cup: 2026
- FIFA Intercontinental Cup: 2025
- FIFA Club World Cup runner-up: 2025

Portugal

- UEFA Nations League: 2024–25

Individual

- Primeira Liga Midfielder of the Month: September 2023, October/November 2023, December 2023, February 2024, March 2024
- Cosme Damião Awards – Revelation of the Year: 2024
- SJPF Young Player of the Month: October/November 2023, February 2024
- Primeira Liga Team of the Year: 2023–24
- UNFP Ligue 1 Team of the Year: 2024–25
- The Athletic European Men's Team of the Season: 2025-2026
