= Michel Goba =

Ivorian footballer (born 1961)

Personal information
- Date of birth: 8 August 1961 (age 65)
- Place of birth: Abidjan, Ivory Coast
- Position: Striker

Senior career*
Years	Team	Apps	(Gls)
1980–1982	Africa Sports		
1982–1983	Brest	16	(5)
1983–1984	AS Angoulême	26	(3)
1984–1985	USL Dunkerque	28	(6)
1985	Racing Besançon	18	(6)
1986–1989	USL Dunkerque	65	(20)
1989–1990	SC Abbeville	16	(0)
Total		169	(40)

International career
1980–1989	Ivory Coast	4	(1)
- * Club domestic league appearances and goals

Michel Goba (born 8 August 1961) is an Ivorian former professional footballer who played as a striker. He played in the French Ligue 2 with Brest, Dunkerque and Abbeville.

== Personal life ==
Goba is the uncle of Didier Drogba. He served as a mentor and father-figure to Drogba when he lived with him in France at a young age. His son, Kévin Goba, is also a professional footballer who spent most of his career in the lower divisions of France.
