= West African Footballer of the Year =

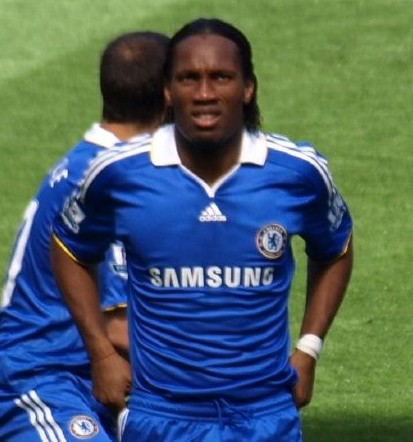
Didier Drogba was named Best of the Best in 2010.

The West African Footballer of the Year, or The Best of the Best was an association football award. It was presented to the west African player considered to have performed the best over the previous season. The award was conceived by the West Africa Football Union (WAFU), and was intended to be given annually beginning in 2010. The inaugural winner was Didier Drogba.

The WAFU was split into two regions in 2011.

== Winners ==
Year	Place	Player	Nationality	Notes
2010	1st	Didier Drogba	Ivory Coast	
2010	2nd	Yaya Touré	Ivory Coast	
2010	3rd	Kader Keïta	Ivory Coast	
