= Didier Drogba =

Ivorian footballer (born 1978)

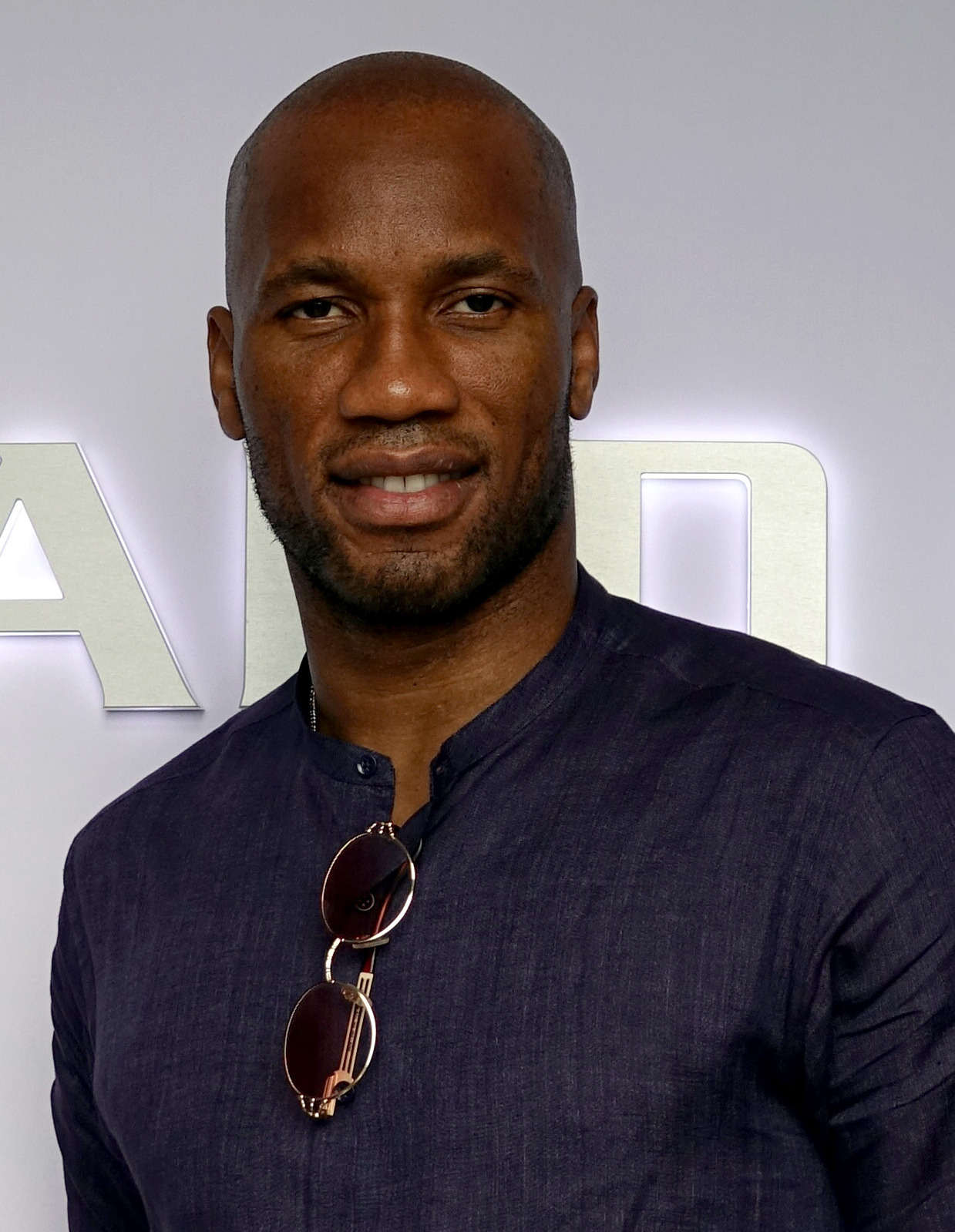
- Drogba in 2019

Personal information
- Full name: Didier Yves Drogba Tébily
- Date of birth: 11 March 1978 (age 48)
- Place of birth: Abidjan, Ivory Coast
- Height: 1.89 m (6 ft 2 in)
- Position: Striker

Youth career
- Dunkerque
- 1988–1989: Tourcoing
- 1989–1991: Abbeville
- 1991–1993: Vannes
- 1993–1997: Levallois
- 1997–1998: Le Mans

Senior career*
Years	Team	Apps	(Gls)
1998–2002	Le Mans	64	(12)
2002–2003	Guingamp	45	(20)
2003–2004	Marseille	35	(19)
2004–2012	Chelsea	226	(100)
2012–2013	Shanghai Shenhua	11	(8)
2013–2014	Galatasaray	37	(15)
2014–2015	Chelsea	28	(4)
2015–2016	Montreal Impact	33	(21)
2017–2018	Phoenix Rising	21	(13)
Total		500	(212)

International career
2002–2014	Ivory Coast	105	(65)
Medal record
Men's football
Representing Ivory Coast
Africa Cup of Nations
Runner-up	2006 Egypt
Runner-up	2012 Equatorial Guinea–Gabon
- * Club domestic league appearances and goals

Didier Yves Drogba Tébily (French pronunciation: [didje iv dʁɔɡba tebili]; born 11 March 1978) is an Ivorian former professional footballer who played as a striker. He is the all-time top scorer and former captain of the Ivory Coast national team. Best known for his career at Chelsea, he is the club’s all-time top foreign goalscorer and their fourth-highest goalscorer of all time. Widely regarded as one of the greatest African players of all time, Drogba was named the African Footballer of the Year twice in 2006 and 2009. He was named in the 2007 FIFA World XI. In 2022, he was inducted into the Premier League Hall of Fame. With a record of scoring 10 goals in 10 finals, Drogba has been called the "ultimate big game player".

After playing in youth teams, Drogba made his football debut at the age of 21 for Ligue 2 club Le Mans. After four seasons, he joined Ligue 1 side Guingamp in 2002 before joining French giants Olympique de Marseille a year later. At Marseille, Drogba was awarded the Ligue 1 Player of the Year in 2003–04 and helped the club reach the 2004 UEFA Cup final. In July 2004, Drogba joined Premier League club Chelsea for £24 million. In his debut season, he helped Chelsea win their first league title in 50 years, and won another a year later. In 2006–07, Drogba earned the Premier League Golden Boot before winning it again in 2009–10 when he scored 29 goals in 32 games to help Chelsea win the Premier League title.

In March 2012, Drogba became the first African player to score 100 Premier League goals. Two months later, he scored in Chelsea's 2012 FA Cup final win over Liverpool to become the first player to score in four FA Cup finals. He also played in the 2012 UEFA Champions League final, where he scored an 88th-minute equaliser and the winning penalty in the penalty shootout against Bayern Munich. After spending six months with Chinese club Shanghai Shenhua, he moved to Turkish club Galatasaray. Drogba returned to Chelsea in July 2014, featuring heavily as Chelsea won the 2014–15 Premier League title. He joined Canadian club Montreal Impact in 2015 as a designated player before becoming a player and owner of Phoenix Rising in the United Soccer League in 2017 and retired a year later at the age of 40.

Drogba made his debut for Ivory Coast in 2002 and became the captain in 2006. He is the nation's all-time top goalscorer with 65 goals in 105 appearances. He led the Ivory Coast to the 2006 FIFA World Cup, their first appearance in the tournament, and scored their first goal. He captained Ivory Coast at the 2010 and 2014 FIFA World Cups. He led Ivory Coast to two Africa Cup of Nations finals in 2006 and 2012, though they lost on penalties on both occasions.On 8 August 2014, he announced his retirement from international football.

Drogba played a vital role in solving issues in his home country and in Africa. In 2007, he was appointed a Goodwill Ambassador for the United Nations Development Programme. In December 2018, he became Vice President of the international organization Peace and Sport.

== Early life ==
Drogba is a member of the Bété people. He was born in Abidjan, Ivory Coast, and at age five was sent to France by his parents to live with his uncle, Michel Goba, a professional footballer. But Drogba became homesick and returned to Abidjan after three years. His mother nicknamed him "Tito", after president Josip Broz Tito of Yugoslavia, whom she admired greatly. He played football every day in a car park in the city, but his return to the Ivory Coast was short-lived. Both his parents lost their jobs and he again went to live with his uncle. In 1991, his parents also travelled to France, first to Vannes and then in 1993 settling in Antony, at which point the 15-year-old Drogba returned to live with them and his siblings. There he began playing team football more frequently, joining a local youth side. Drogba then joined the semi-professional club Levallois, gaining a reputation as a prolific scorer in the youth team and impressing the coach with his professional attitude. His performances earned him a place in the senior squad but despite scoring in his debut, he failed to impress Jacques Loncar, the first-team coach.

== Club career ==
=== Le Mans ===
When Drogba finished school he moved to Le Mans to study accountancy at university and changed clubs, becoming an apprentice at Ligue 2 club Le Mans. His first two years there were marred by injuries and he physically struggled to cope with the training and match schedule. Former Le Mans coach Marc Westerloppe later said, "it took Didier four years to be capable of training every day and playing every week". Furthermore, Drogba had never attended a football academy and only began daily football training as an adult.

By age 21, Drogba realised that he had to establish himself as a player soon or he would have little chance of becoming a professional. He made his first team debut for Le Mans soon thereafter and signed his first professional contract in 1999. The same year, he and his Malian wife Alla had their first child, Isaac. He grew into his new responsibilities, later saying: "Isaac's birth was a turning point in my life, it straightened me out". His first season, in which he scored seven goals in 30 games, boded well for the future, but during the next season he did not live up to expectations. Drogba lost his place to Daniel Cousin due to injury, and upon his return, failed to score for the rest of the season. He returned to form the next season, scoring five goals in 21 appearances.

=== Guingamp ===
Halfway through the 2001–02 season Ligue 1 club Guingamp consolidated months of interest with a transfer offer and Drogba left Le Mans for a fee of £80,000. The second half of the 2001–02 season saw Drogba make 11 appearances and score three goals for Guingamp. While his contributions helped the club avoid relegation, the coaching staff remained unconvinced of their new young striker. But the next season he rewarded his coaches' patience, scoring 17 goals in 34 appearances and helping Guingamp finish seventh, a record league finish. He credited his teammates for his impressive season, highlighting the contributions of winger Florent Malouda, a longtime friend of Drogba, as a key factor in his goalscoring prolificity that season. His strong goal scoring record attracted interest from larger clubs, and at the end of the season, he moved to Ligue 1 side Olympique de Marseille for a fee of £3.3 million.

=== Marseille ===
Olympique de Marseille signed Drogba on 30 June 2003. He played his first match in his new colours on 2 August 2003, during the first matchday of the 2003–2004 season against his former club, Guingamp. In that season Drogba emerged as one of the highest European scorers. He scored 19 league goals, winning the National Union of Professional Footballers (UNFP) Player of the Year award. He also scored 11 goals in European competitions, five goals in UEFA Champions League and six in the UEFA Cup.

At the end of the season, Drogba was a transfer priority of newly endorsed Chelsea coach José Mourinho, and was bought as the club's then record signing of £24 million. His shirt from his only season at Marseille is framed in the basilica of the city, Notre-Dame de la Garde, which he presented to the church before the 2004 UEFA Cup Final.

=== Chelsea ===
==== 2004–06 ====
Signing for Chelsea in July 2004 for £24 million, he became the club's record signing and the most expensive striker in English domestic football. Drogba scored in his third game for the club with a header against Crystal Palace. His season was interrupted when he pulled a stomach muscle against Liverpool which kept him out of action for over two months. Chelsea won the Premier League, only their second English top-flight championship and their first in 50 years, and the League Cup. Later, Drogba scored in extra time in a 3–2 final win against Liverpool at the Millennium Stadium, as well as reaching the semi-finals of the Champions League. Drogba scored a somewhat disappointing 16 goals in a total of 40 games for Chelsea in his first season: ten in the Premier League, five in the Champions League and one in the League Cup final.

Drogba started the 2005–06 season by scoring two goals in a Community Shield win over Arsenal. His reputation was marred amidst accusations of cheating during Chelsea's 2–0 win over Manchester City. Replays showed that he had used his hand to control the ball before scoring the second of his two goals. This occurred just a week after a similar incident against Fulham where the goal was disallowed. Chelsea went on to retain the league title with two games to play, becoming only the second club to win back-to-back English titles in the Premier League era. Again Drogba finished with 16 goals for the season, 12 in the Premier League, two in the Community Shield, one in the Champions League and one in the FA Cup.

==== 2006–07 ====
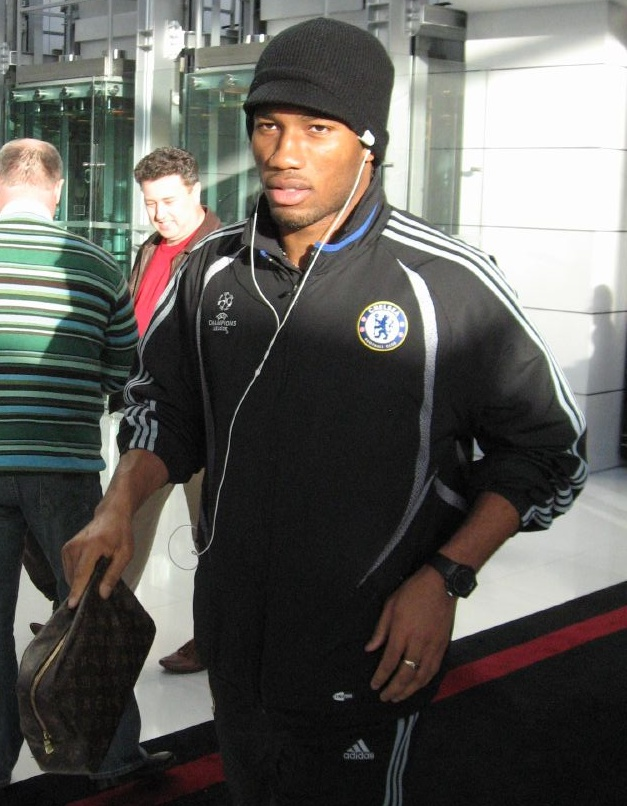
Drogba with Chelsea in February 2007 prior to a UEFA Champions League game with FC Porto

After the departure of Damien Duff to Newcastle United, Drogba switched from the number 15 shirt he had worn for Chelsea since 2004 to the number 11 shirt vacated by Duff. Drogba scored 33 goals in all competitions during the season (more than his tally in the previous two seasons combined), including 20 in the Premier League to win the Golden Boot. In doing so, he became the first Chelsea player since Kerry Dixon in 1984–85 to reach 30 goals in a season, scoring 20 in the Premier League, six in the Champions League, three in the FA Cup and four in the League Cup.

Among the highlights were scoring game-winners from outside the penalty area against Liverpool, Everton (from 35 yards out) and Barcelona, a 93rd-minute equaliser against Barcelona at the Camp Nou and both Chelsea's goals in their 2–1 League Cup final win over Arsenal. His goal against Liverpool saw him control the ball on his chest with his back to goal before hitting a 20-yard half-volley on the turn. Liverpool defender Jamie Carragher said, "There's not a lot you can do in certain situations because they were that good." He also completed two hat-tricks; one against Watford and the other against Levski Sofia in the Champions League, Chelsea's first hat-trick in European competition since Gianluca Vialli in the Cup Winners' Cup in 1997. In his last competitive game that season, he scored the winning goal against Manchester United in the first FA Cup final at the new Wembley Stadium. This also meant he became the only player to score in both English domestic finals in the same season and win both.

In January 2007, Drogba was named the Ivorian Player of the Year, ahead of Kader Keïta, Aruna Dindane, and Kolo Touré. In March, he was named African Footballer of the Year for the first time, ahead of Samuel Eto'o and Chelsea teammate Michael Essien. His performances during the season saw him named in the PFA Premier League Team of the Year and runner-up to Cristiano Ronaldo in the PFA Player of the Year awards.

Drogba faced problems off the pitch during the end of the season as his transfer from Marseille to Chelsea in July 2004 came under scrutiny. The Stevens inquiry in June 2007 expressed concerns because of the lack of co-operation from agents Pinhas Zahavi and Barry Silkman.

==== 2007–08 ====
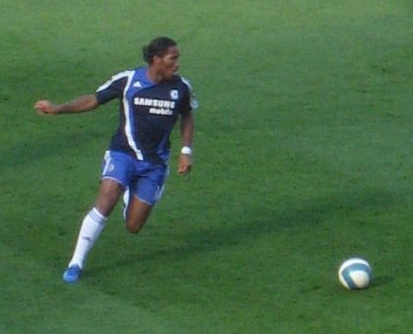
Drogba training with Chelsea in October 2007

The 2007–08 season began badly for Drogba as he expressed doubts about the departure of manager José Mourinho. He was reportedly in tears when Mourinho told him he was leaving, and said "Mourinho's departure destroys a certain familiarity we had at the club. Many of us used to play first and foremost for the manager. Now we need to forget those feelings and find another source of motivation". Drogba told France Football magazine: "I want to leave Chelsea. Something is broken with Chelsea, The damage is big in the dressing room". Despite having signed a four-year contract with the club in 2006, Drogba reportedly pointed out several favoured clubs in the interview, identifying Barcelona, Real Madrid, A.C. Milan and Inter Milan as possible future destinations. He later said he regretted this and was 100% committed to Chelsea. Drogba made it up to the fans by scoring in Chelsea's 2–0 victory over Middlesbrough on 20 October 2007, against Schalke 04 in the Champions League four days later, and two goals against Manchester City. In December 2007, Drogba was voted fourth (after Kaká, Lionel Messi and Cristiano Ronaldo) for the 2007 FIFA World Player of the Year.

Drogba continued scoring goals but suffered an injury at the training ground and decided to have an operation on his knee. He was unable to play for four weeks and missed key games against Valencia, Arsenal and Liverpool. Drogba returned from injury to play in an FA Cup third round match against Queens Park Rangers and wore the captain's armband for the last 30 minutes he was on the pitch, but that was his last performance for Chelsea before international duty at the Africa Cup of Nations. Upon his return, Drogba scored a goal in the 2008 League Cup Final, making him the all-time leading scorer in League Cup Finals with four goals, but could not help prevent Chelsea fall to a 2–1 defeat at the hands of Tottenham Hotspur. He scored both goals in a key 2–1 victory against Arsenal on 23 March 2008, bringing Chelsea equal on points with leaders Manchester United.

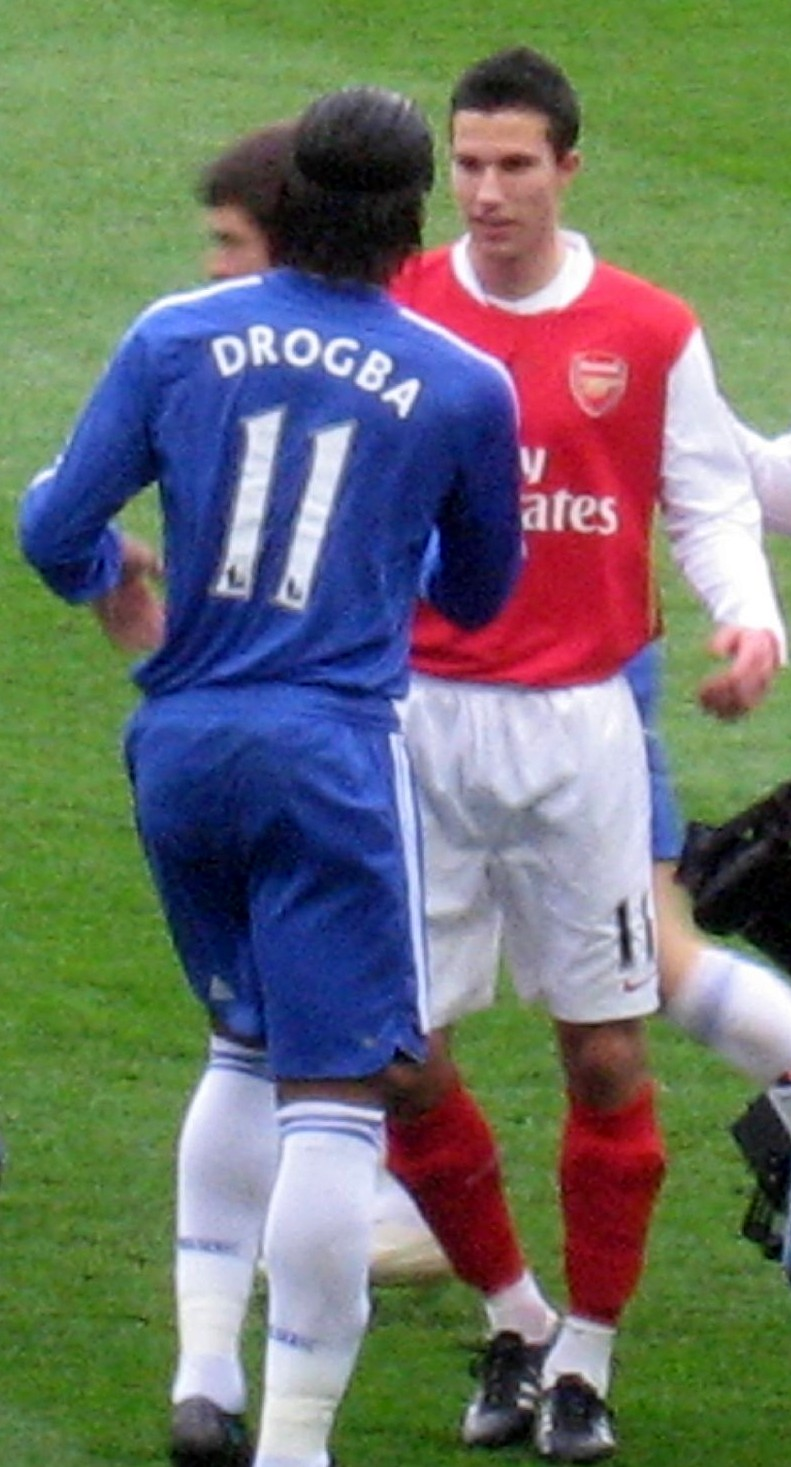
Drogba and Arsenal striker Robin van Persie in March 2008

On 26 April 2008, Drogba faced controversy after a clash with Manchester United defender Nemanja Vidić, who had to have stitches under his lip after losing a tooth in the clash. It was debated whether Drogba intended to injure him. The debate also called into question an incident on 26 November 2006 when Drogba elbowed Vidić. Manchester United manager Sir Alex Ferguson expressed concerns over elbowing in the Premier League. Despite media speculation, Drogba's yellow card for the clash was deemed adequate punishment by the Football Association.

Controversy still dogged Drogba, as before the UEFA Champions League semi-final second leg clash with Liverpool, he was accused of diving by Liverpool manager Rafael Benítez. Benítez claimed to have compiled a four-year dossier of Drogba's "diving" antics but Drogba hit back at Benítez in an interview. On 30 April 2008, Drogba scored two goals in the second leg of the semi-final against Liverpool, which Chelsea won 3–2 at Stamford Bridge. This was the first time Chelsea had beaten Liverpool in the semi-finals of the Champions League, having lost their previous two meetings to Liverpool. This also led Chelsea to reach their first Champions League Final. Drogba became Chelsea's top scorer in European competition, the two goals he scored putting his total at 17, surpassing Peter Osgood's record of 16. Drogba was sent off in the 117th minute of the 2008 UEFA Champions League Final against Manchester United for slapping Vidić, becoming only the second player to be sent off in a European Cup final – after Jens Lehmann in 2006 – and the first for violent conduct. Chelsea went on to lose 6–5 on penalties after a 1–1 draw in extra time. Chelsea assistant boss Henk ten Cate revealed Drogba was due to take the decisive fifth spot-kick in the shootout. Team captain John Terry took his place but missed after slipping whilst taking the penalty.

==== 2008–09 ====
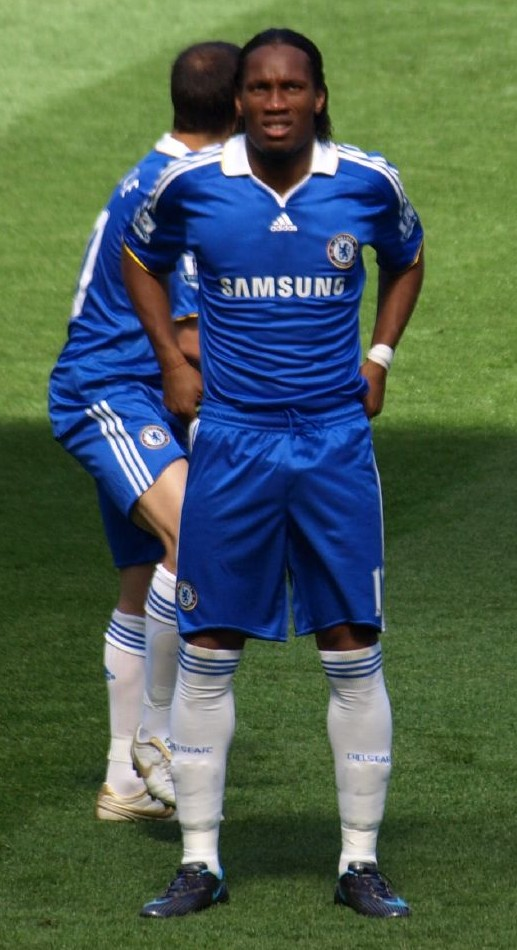
Drogba with Chelsea prior to a Premier League game at Stamford Bridge in May 2008

Drogba suffered a string of injuries early on in the 2008–09 season and struggled to regain fitness, missing games from August to November due to knee problems. He scored his first goal of the season in mid-November but there was little reason to celebrate: he incurred disciplinary action and a three-match ban for throwing a coin back into the stands and Chelsea suffered a League Cup defeat against Burnley. Drogba scored his second goal of the season in a 2–1 victory against CFR Cluj in the UEFA Champions League, while his first Premier League goal of the season came in a 2–0 win against West Bromwich Albion in late December 2008. Having missed many games through injury and suspension, Drogba had lost his first team place and manager Scolari favoured playing Nicolas Anelka as a lone striker rather than pairing the two. But he resolved to regain his position in the squad.

Upon the temporary appointment of Guus Hiddink in early February, Drogba enjoyed a rejuvenation of sorts, returning to his goal-scoring form with four goals in five games. His revival in form saw him net twice against Bolton Wanderers, and four times in four Champions League matches, one in each leg of the last 16 and quarter-final of the competition against Juventus and Liverpool respectively, with these goals ensuring Chelsea's passage into the semi-finals. Just four days after his Champions League games, Drogba scored a late goal in the FA Cup semi-final match against Arsenal after Frank Lampard's pass found Drogba and he carefully rounded Arsenal goalkeeper Łukasz Fabiański before passing the ball into Arsenal's empty net. Drogba also caused controversy after Chelsea's Champions League semi-final defeat at the hands of Barcelona. Feeling that many decisions had gone against Chelsea, Drogba confronted referee Tom Henning Øvrebø after the final whistle. He received a yellow card and was recorded shouting "It's a fucking disgrace" into a live television camera. On 17 June 2009, UEFA handed him a six-game European ban with the final two games suspended. The ban was reduced by one match after Chelsea appealed. In the 2009 FA Cup Final, Drogba scored Chelsea's first and equalising goal as they went on to win 2–1. This was his sixth goal in a major cup final in England. Drogba had previously expressed his desire to switch clubs, but decided to remain with the Blues under new coach Carlo Ancelotti and signed a new contract.

==== 2009–10 ====
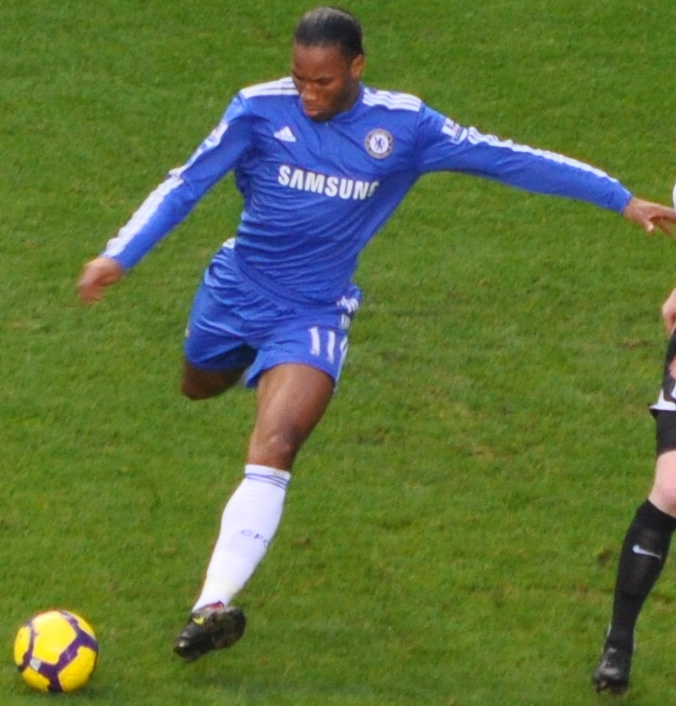
Drogba in action against Fulham in the Premier League, December 2009

Drogba began the 2009–10 season in fine form for Chelsea, netting a penalty during a shoot-out win in the Community Shield over Manchester United, before scoring twice in a 2–1 victory over Hull City. Drogba earned himself an assist when he was fouled in the penalty box to give Chelsea a penalty, which Frank Lampard converted, in a 3–1 victory over Sunderland. In Chelsea's third game of the season against West-London rivals Fulham, Drogba scored his third goal of the season. Drogba scored his fourth goal of the season, against Stoke City; Chelsea ended winning the game 2–1 with a late strike from Malouda. He added a fifth at home against London rivals Tottenham Hotspur on 20 September.

He scored his 100th goal for Chelsea in a 3–1 defeat against Wigan Athletic. Drogba was again important in the 2–0 win over title rivals Liverpool on 4 October. He assisted both goals, setting up Nicolas Anelka and Florent Malouda. He then scored a glancing header against Blackburn on 24 October 2009, bringing his tally to eight goals in eleven appearances, scoring his third goal in as many games. Drogba continued his fine form scoring a header against Bolton Wanderers in a 4–0 win in the League Cup, Drogba went on to score a goal in the same week with another 4–0 win against Bolton Wanderers in the Premier League.

After missing the first three Champions League matches for Chelsea with a ban for being unsportsmanlike, Drogba started the fourth game against Spanish side Atlético Madrid. He scored two goals in the last ten minutes and the match ended 2–2. On 29 November, Drogba scored a goal against London rivals Arsenal at the Emirates Stadium, the second of which a free kick from outside the box. It brought his tally for the season to 14 goals in 16 games. On 12 December, Drogba continued his performance with two goals in 3–3 draw against Everton. Between 3 and 30 January Drogba was on Africa Cup of Nations duty and came back on 2 February against Hull City where he scored a 40th-minute equaliser to tie the game 1–1. On 24 March, Drogba scored his 30th goal of the season in an away game against Portsmouth.

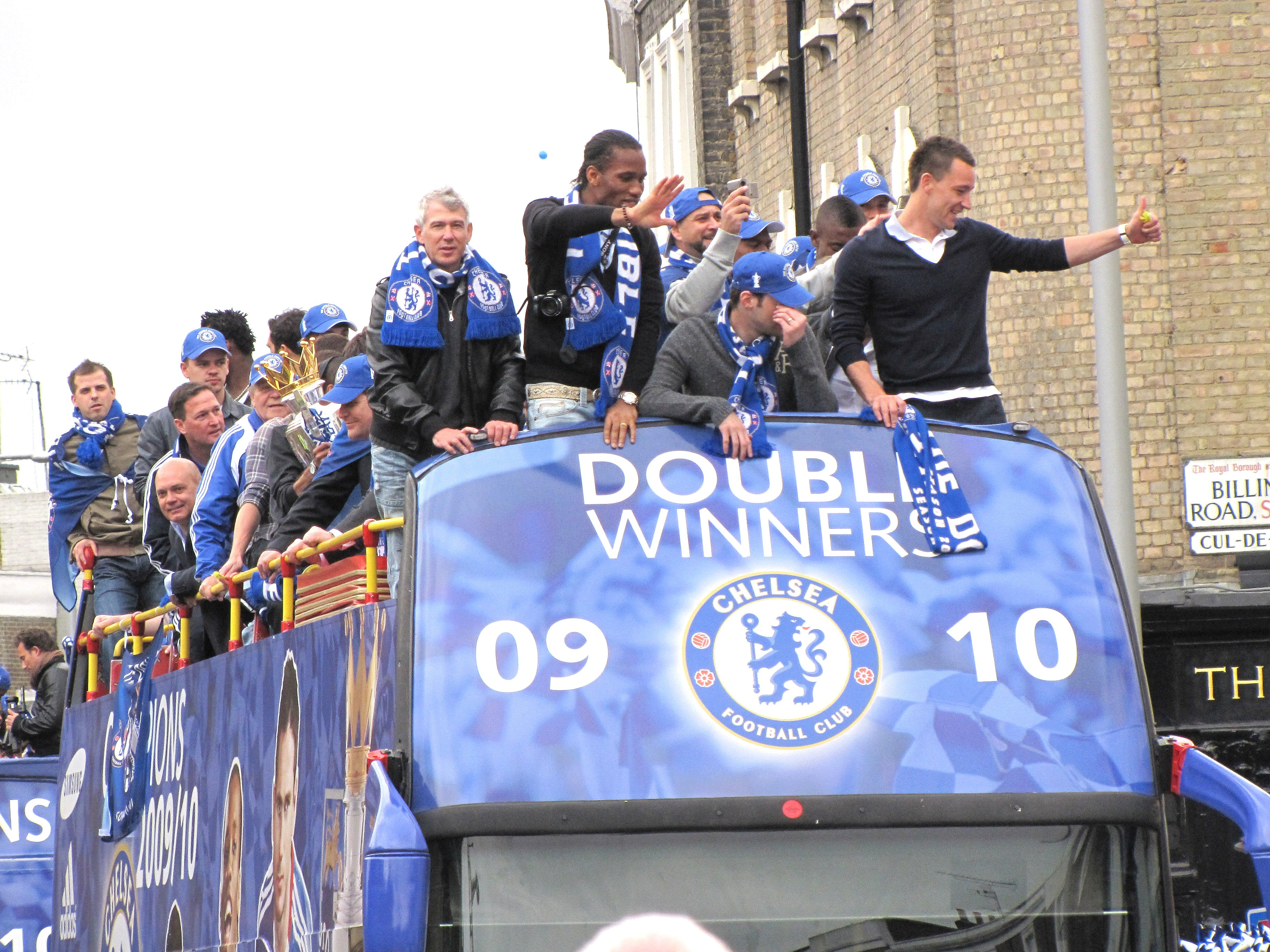
Drogba (front, second from left) on a street parade with Chelsea after winning the league and cup double in May 2010

On 9 May, Drogba helped Chelsea to win the Premier League by scoring a hat-trick in an 8–0 win over Wigan Athletic. In doing so, he not only collected his third League winner's medal but also won the Golden Boot for the season, his second time doing so, by topping the chart with 29 league goals, beating Wayne Rooney to the title who remained on 26 goals. Both players had the same number of goals (26) before the start of their respective matches. However, during the game, Drogba appeared to be clearly angry with teammate and regular penalty taker Frank Lampard, after Lampard refused to let Drogba take a penalty which would lead Chelsea to go 2–0 up and give him a chance of winning the golden boot. Lampard scored the penalty, but Drogba did not celebrate with his teammates. Later on in the game though Ashley Cole was tripped in the box when Chelsea were already 5–0 up, and this time Lampard allowed Drogba to take the penalty, which he scored to go two goals clear of Rooney.

The following week, Drogba scored the only goal of the 2010 FA Cup Final against Portsmouth from a free-kick, keeping up his record of having scored in all six English cup finals (FA Cup and League Cup) in which he has played.

==== 2010–11 ====
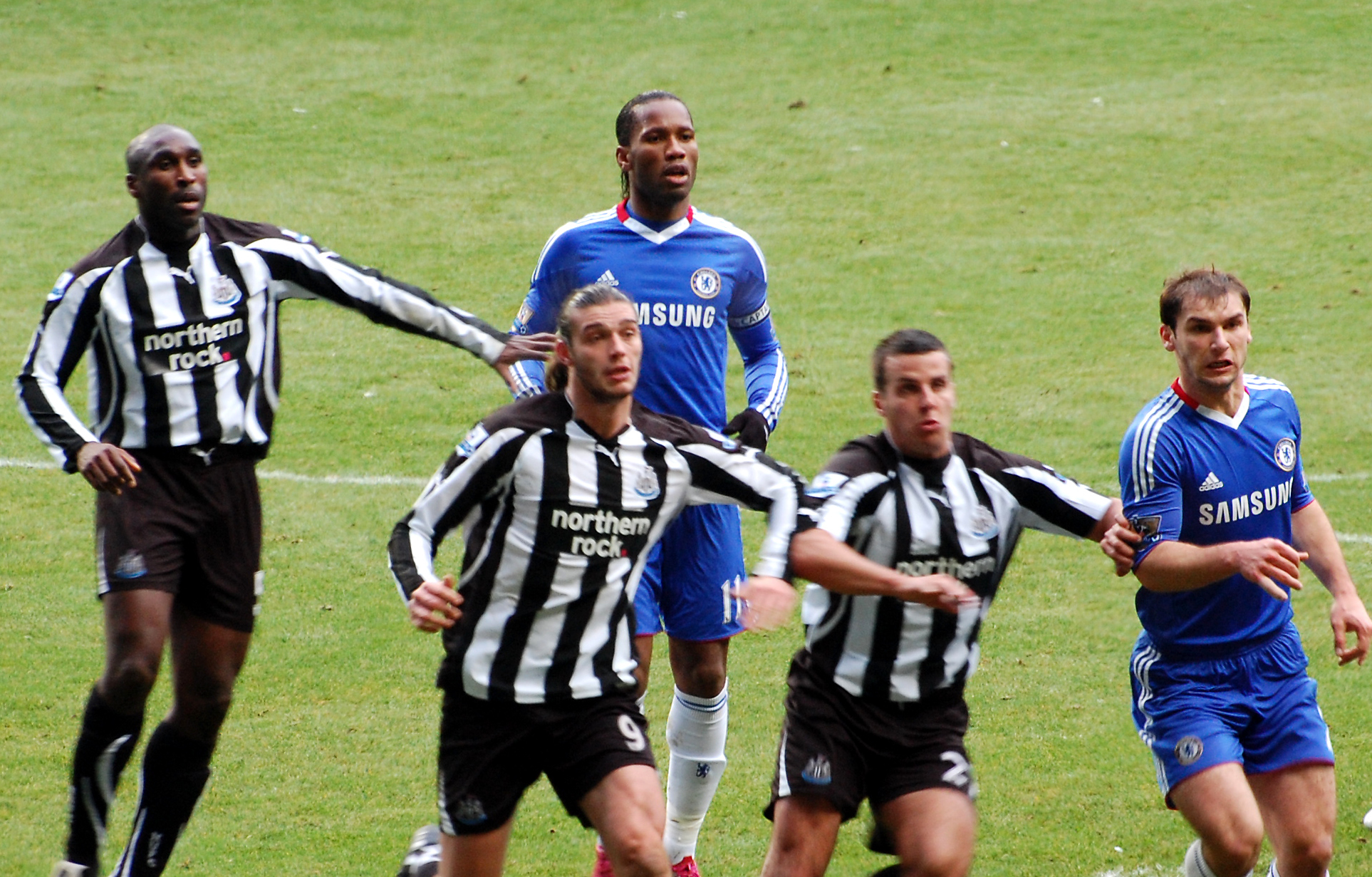
Drogba (back centre) preparing for a corner kick against Newcastle United in November 2010

Drogba came on as a substitute for Anelka against Manchester United in the Community Shield, but could not help prevent Chelsea from succumbing to a 3–1 loss. However, he started the Premier League season in fine form, continuing from where he left off on the last day of the previous campaign as he scored a hat-trick against West Bromwich Albion in a 6–0 victory. In Chelsea's next game against Wigan Athletic at the DW Stadium, Drogba made three assists in another 6–0 win.

Drogba played the next game at home against Stoke City where he lasted the whole 90 minutes and scored his fourth Premier League goal of the season when he kicked home a penalty after Nicolas Anelka was brought down by Thomas Sørensen inside the box. On 7 November 2010, Drogba missed the first half of Chelsea's 2–0 defeat by Liverpool at Anfield. It was later revealed that he had been suffering from malaria for at least a month. He had first complained of feeling unwell before the October 2010 international break but the illness was only diagnosed on 8 November 2010. Having diagnosed the problem, Chelsea insisted that he would make a full recovery within days.

==== 2011–12 ====
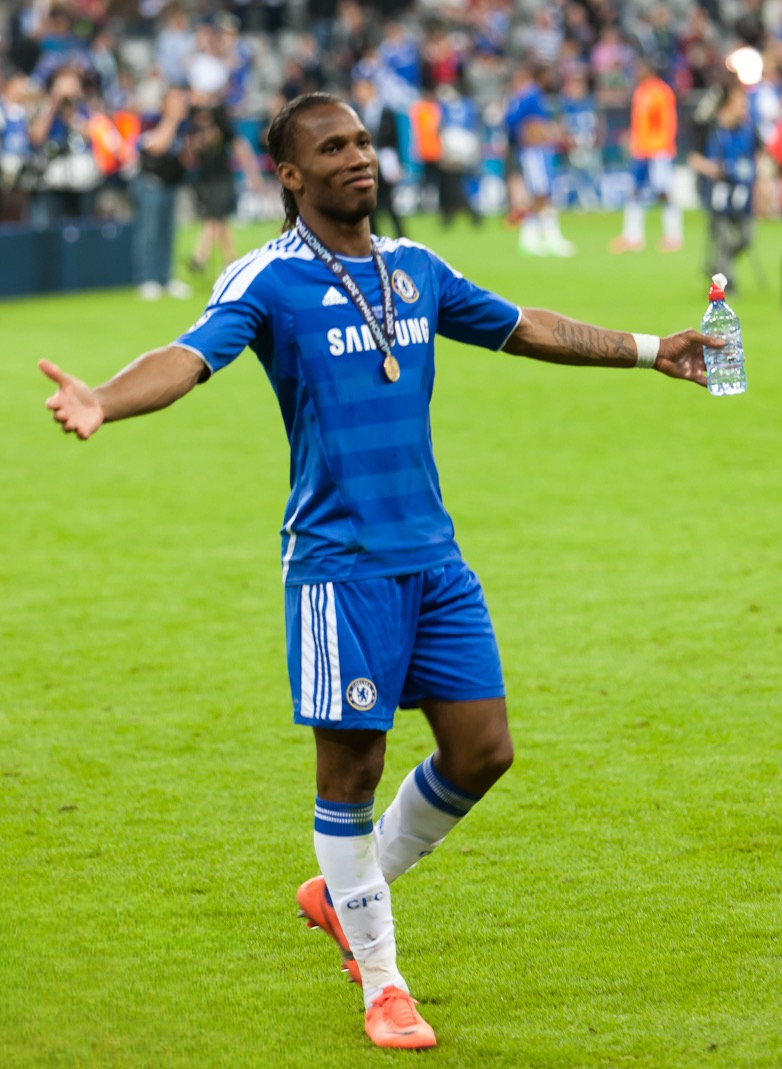
Drogba scored the equaliser and the match-winning penalty to win the 2012 UEFA Champions League

While playing against Norwich City on 27 August 2011, Drogba suffered a concussion in a collision with Norwich goalkeeper John Ruddy. After missing two games, he made his return to the Chelsea squad on 24 September against Swansea City. Drogba scored his first goal of the season in a 4–1 win. On 29 November, he rejected a new deal with Chelsea and was set to sign for the highest bidder. On 31 December 2011, Drogba scored his 150th goal for Chelsea against Aston Villa, putting him level with Peter Osgood and Roy Bentley in terms of the club's top scorers of all time. Even though Chelsea was leading with the penalty scored by Drobga, the game ended in a 3–1 loss for Chelsea. Drogba scored his 99th Premier League goal for Chelsea on 25 February 2012, in a 3–0 win over Bolton Wanderers. He scored his 100th Premier League goal for Chelsea on 10 March 2012, in a 1–0 win over Stoke City. He is the first African player to reach that landmark.

In the dressing room before a big game, it was a different Didier, he was like an animal. His preparation, the intensity in his eyes, and then he always produced.

— Teammate Frank Lampard on Drogba (who scored nine goals in nine finals for Chelsea) delivering in big games.

Drogba scored his seventh goal at Wembley Stadium against London rivals Tottenham Hotspur on 15 April, blasting the ball past former teammate Carlo Cudicini as Chelsea became 5–1 winners and secured a place in the FA Cup Final against Liverpool. Three days later, he scored a vital goal as Chelsea beat Barcelona 1–0 at Stamford Bridge in the first leg of their UEFA Champions League Semi-final clash. Drogba became the first player to score in four different FA Cup Finals, as he netted the winner in Chelsea's 2–1 triumph over Liverpool on 5 May. He also holds the record for most goals scored at the new Wembley Stadium with eight.

In the Champions League final against Bayern Munich on 19 May 2012, with Chelsea down 1–0, Drogba scored the equaliser from Juan Mata's corner in the 88th minute, taking the game into extra time, when he gave away a penalty for Bayern after fouling Franck Ribéry in the box; former teammate Arjen Robben's shot was saved by Petr Čech. The game went to a penalty shootout, where he scored the winning penalty to give Chelsea their first Champions League trophy. Sir Alex Ferguson remarked: "As far as I was concerned, he [Drogba] won the Champions League for Chelsea." Drogba's headed effort marked his ninth goal in nine cup final appearances for Chelsea, Chelsea legend Gianfranco Zola spoke after the match about Drogba's ability in big games: "In all their very important matches he has put a stamp on it." In November 2012, Drogba was named Chelsea's greatest ever player in a poll of 20,000 fans conducted by Chelsea FC Magazine.

=== Shanghai Shenhua ===
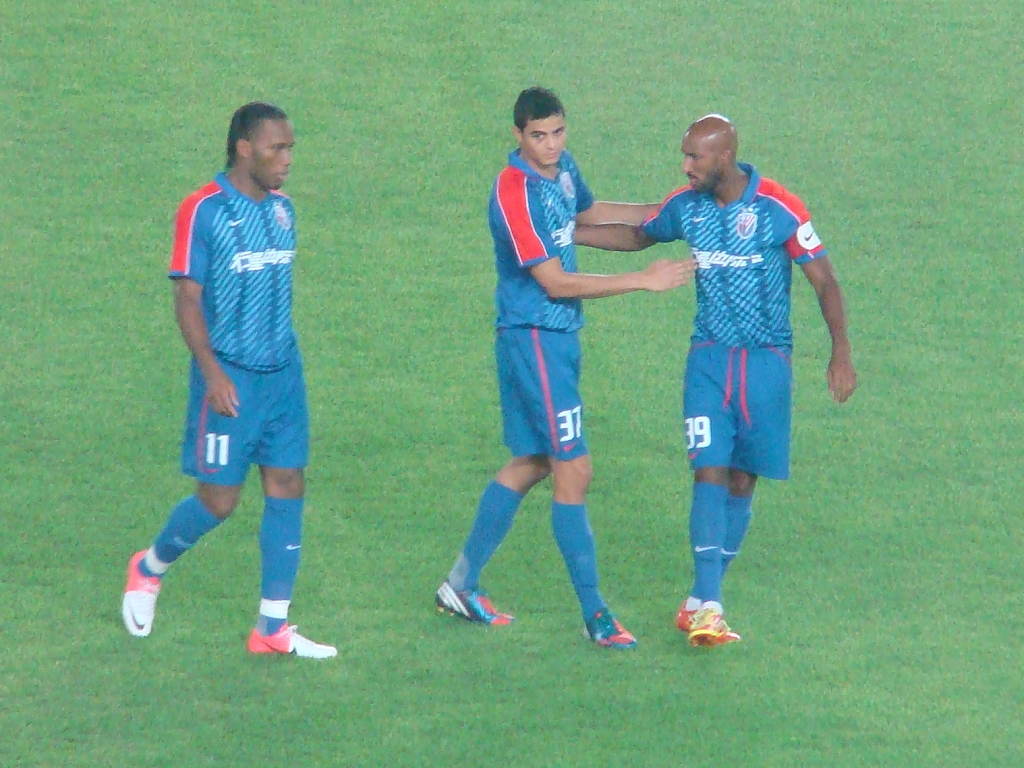
Drogba (left) playing for Shanghai Shenhua in July 2012

On 22 May 2012, Chelsea released a note on their official website announcing that Drogba would leave the club when his contract expired at the end of June 2012. On 19 June 2012, Drogba declared he would join Chinese Super League side Shanghai Shenhua, linking up with his former Chelsea teammate Nicolas Anelka. It was reported that he signed a two-and-a-half-year deal for £200,000 a week. On 22 July, Drogba made his debut for Shanghai Shenhua in a 1–1 away draw against Guangzhou R&F, coming on as a substitute for Brazilian defender Moisés in the second half. He assisted Cao Yunding's equaliser in the 67th minute. On 4 August, he scored his first two goals in a 5–1 win against Hangzhou Greentown. He scored two more goals on 25 August, both set up by Anelka, as Shenhua drew 3–3 with Shandong Luneng.

=== Galatasaray ===
On 28 January 2013, Drogba agreed to a one-and-a-half-year deal with Süper Lig team Galatasaray. He would earn a sign-on fee of €4 million plus basic wage of €4 million per season, €2 million for the remaining 2012–13 Süper Lig and €15,000 per match. However, on 30 January 2013, Shenhua released a press release that Drogba would unilaterally breach his contract if he were to join Galatasaray.

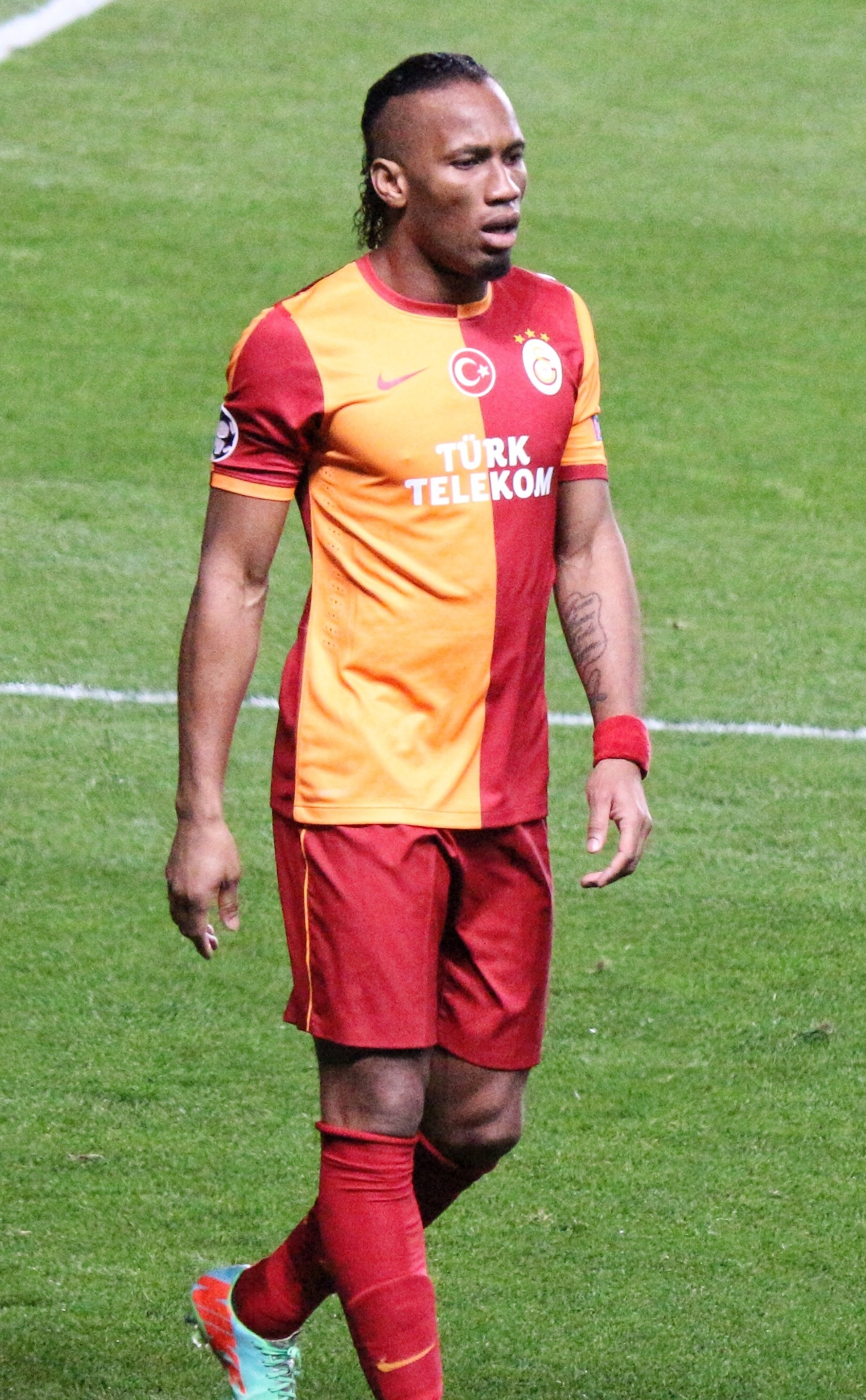
Drogba playing in the UEFA Champions League last 16 for Galatasaray in March 2014

Drogba argued that he had not been paid his wages by the club and asked FIFA, the sport's governing body, to invalidate his contract. In February 2013, FIFA granted a temporary license for him to play for Galatasaray pending the outcome of the contract dispute.

On 15 February, Drogba scored his debut goal for Galatasaray just five minutes after coming off the bench against Akhisar Belediyespor in a match that ended 2–1. On 9 April, he scored his first goal for Galatasaray in the Champions League quarter-final game, against Real Madrid. On 20 April, Drogba scored twice in a match against Elazigspor that ended 3–1.

He won his first title with Galatasaray on 5 May, with a 4–2 win over Sivasspor. In Galatasary's derby match against Istanbul rivals Fenerbahçe on 12 May, Drogba and his Ivorian teammate Emmanuel Eboue were subjects of racist chants from opposing fans in the team's 2–1 loss, but no fine or bans were handed down to the supporters or the club. On 11 August, he scored the only goal in the 2013 Turkish Super Cup against the same opponents, and he scored two second-half goals in a 2–1 away win against fellow city rivals Beşiktaş on 22 September, although the match was abandoned due to hooliganism from fans of the opponents.

=== Return to Chelsea ===
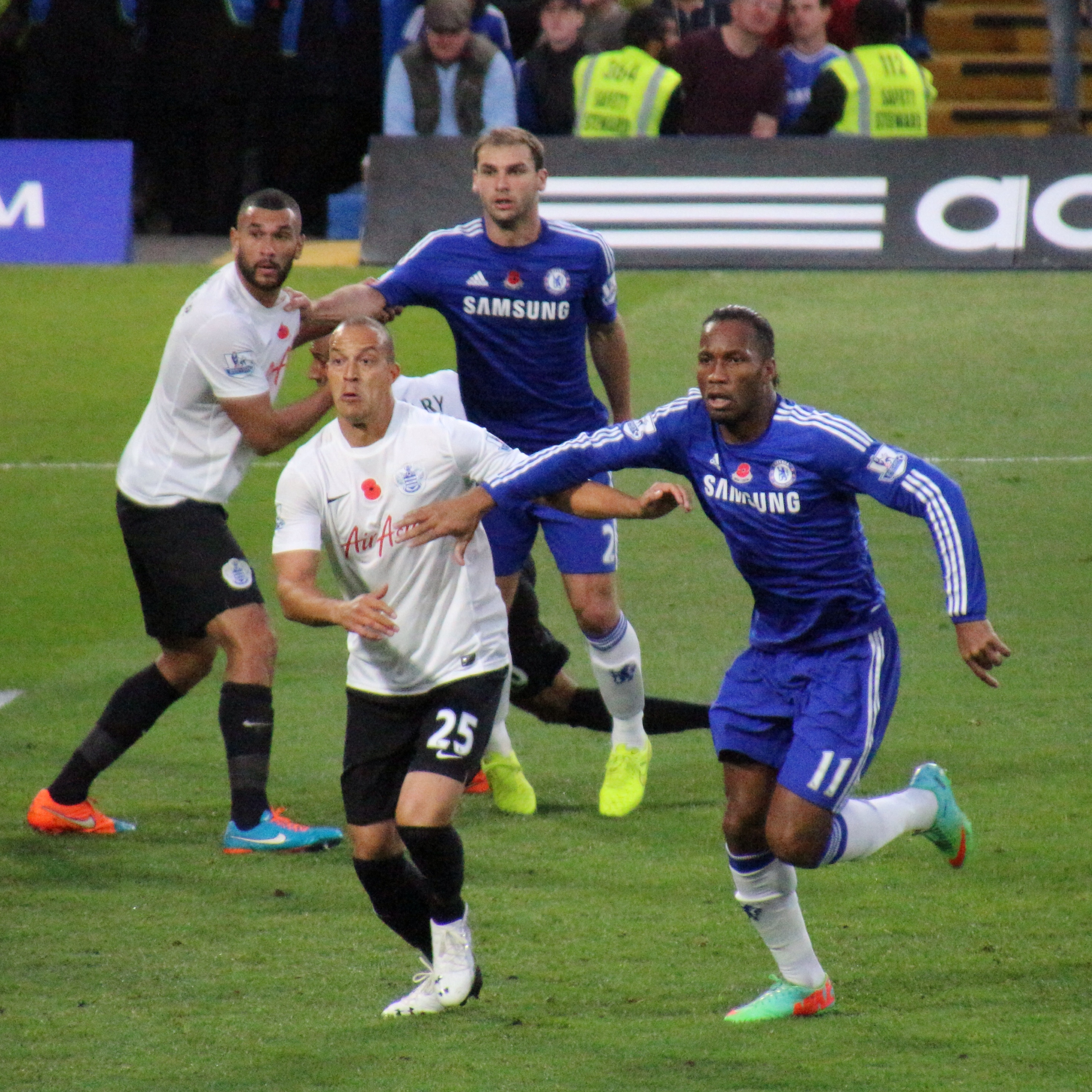
Drogba (far right) playing for Chelsea in November 2014

On 25 July 2014, Chelsea announced that Drogba completed his return to the club on a free transfer, and signed a one-year contract. Of his move back to the club, Drogba said:

It was an easy decision. I couldn't turn down the opportunity to work with José Mourinho again. Everyone knows the special relationship I have with this club and it has always felt like home to me.

Mourinho also commented on the transfer, saying: "He's coming because he's one of the best strikers in Europe. I know his personality very well and I know if he comes back he's not protected by history or what he's done for this club previously. He is coming with the mentality to make more history." On 28 July 2014, Chelsea announced that Drogba would wear the number 15 shirt he wore when he first signed for the club in 2004. Mohamed Salah, who wore the number during the 2013–14 season, took over the number 17 shirt vacated by Eden Hazard. But on 15 August, it was announced that Drogba had been given back the number 11 shirt he previously wore at the club, with its previous occupant Oscar taking over the number 8 jersey vacated by Frank Lampard.

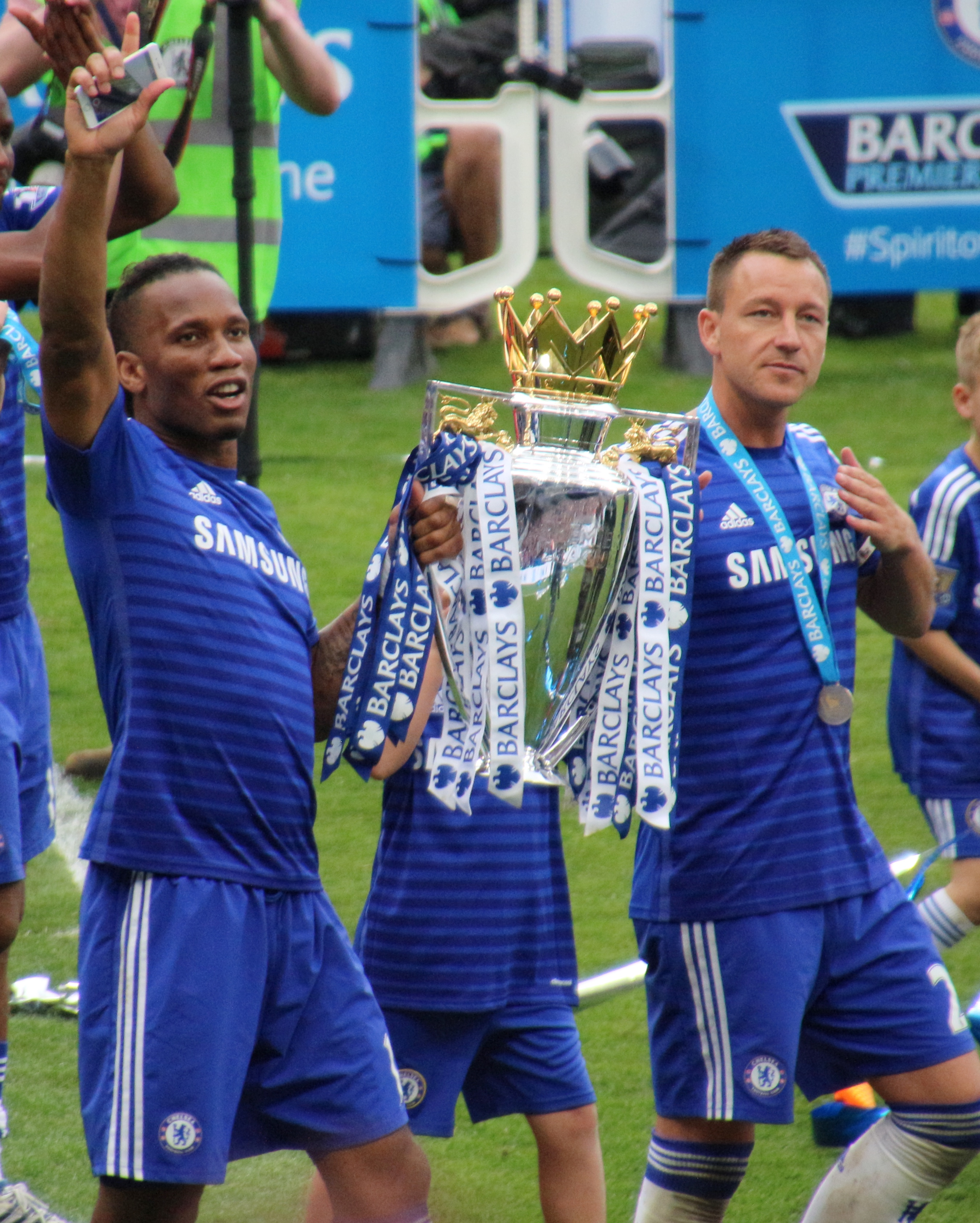
Drogba and John Terry holding the Premier League trophy in May 2015

Drogba made his Premier League return for Chelsea in a 3–1 win away to Burnley, replacing winger Eden Hazard in the 84th minute at Turf Moor on 18 August 2014. On 17 September he made the first start of his second spell, in a 1–1 home draw against Schalke 04 in Chelsea's first game of the Champions League group stage. He scored his first goal in his second spell at Stamford Bridge on 21 October, converting a penalty kick in a 6–0 win over Maribor in the Champions League. Five days later, with Chelsea's attack limited by injuries to Diego Costa and Loïc Rémy, Drogba started against Manchester United at Old Trafford, making his 350th appearance for the club. Early in the second-half, he headed in the first Premier League goal of his second spell although Robin van Persie equalised in added time. He scored his 50th goal in European football against Schalke 04.

On 24 May 2015, Drogba announced that Chelsea's final game of the season against Sunderland would be his last as a Chelsea player. He started the game as captain and was substituted with injury after half an hour, being carried off by his teammates in an eventual 3–1 win. Drogba's final total of 104 goals was the most by an African in Premier League history until it was surpassed by Liverpool and Egypt forward Mohamed Salah in 2021.

=== Montreal Impact ===
On 27 July 2015, Drogba signed a Designated Player contract with Major League Soccer side Montreal Impact, believed to be 18 months in length. On 23 August, he made his debut in a 0–1 home loss against the Philadelphia Union, coming on as a substitute for Dilly Duka in the second half. On 5 September, Drogba scored a hat-trick on his first MLS start, the first player to do so in the league's history. Additionally, it was considered a "perfect hat-trick", with one goal scored with either foot and one with the head. He was September's MLS Player of the Month after scoring 7 goals in his first 5 games in the league.

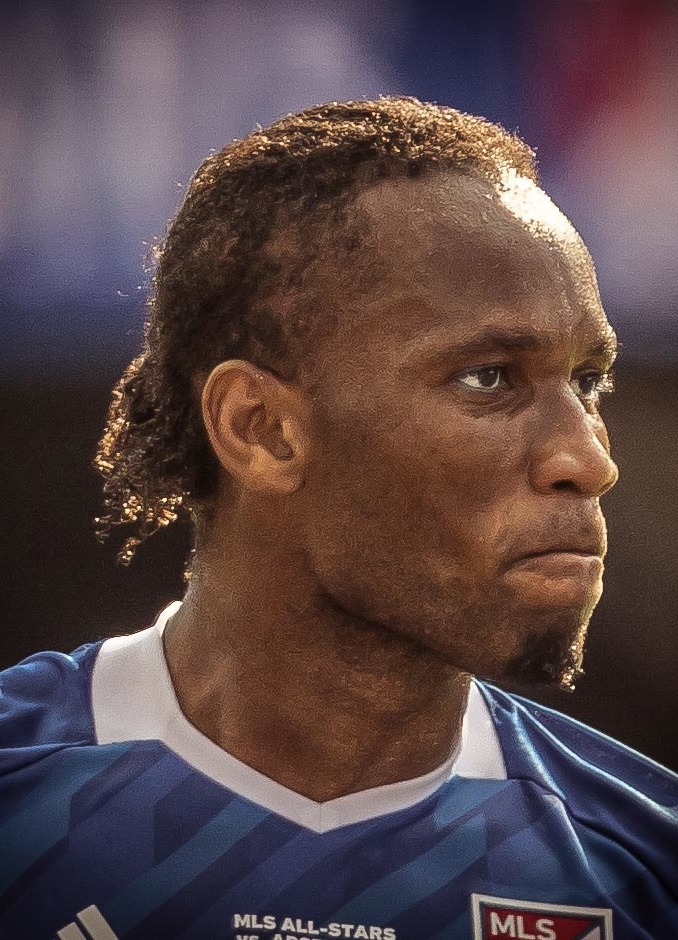
Drogba during the 2016 MLS All-Star Game

On 25 October, he scored both of the Impact's goals from back heels as the team came from behind to defeat Toronto FC 2–1 at home in the Canadian Classique; the win gave Montreal the home advantage for their knock-out fixture against Toronto in the 2015 MLS Cup Playoffs. Drogba finished the 2015 MLS regular season with 11 goals in 11 games. On 29 October, Drogba scored Montreal's third goal in a 3–0 home win over Toronto in the knock-out round of the Playoffs, to advance to the Eastern Conference Semi-finals for the first time in the club's history; they were eliminated by Columbus Crew SC. He was named one of the three finalists for the 2015 MLS Newcomer of the Year Award.

During the MLS offseason, recently appointed Chelsea manager Guus Hiddink revealed interest in bringing on Drogba in a short-term coaching capacity after Drogba visited Stamford Bridge to watch a Chelsea match with Hiddink and owner Roman Abramovich. Montreal then reiterated their intent for Drogba to finish his contract with the club, but were left uncertain until Drogba publicly confirmed his intent to play with Montreal for the 2016 MLS season on 3 March 2016. After beginning his preseason training in Qatar away from the club, Drogba joined the Impact for the second half of their preseason training in St. Petersburg, Florida. On 3 March, club technical director Adam Braz announced that Drogba would not play matches on artificial turf to begin the season due to possible implications on his knee.

In July 2016, Drogba was included in the roster for the 2016 MLS All-Star Game, scoring in a 2–1 defeat to Arsenal on 28 July. On 14 October, following his exclusion from the starting lineup of a match against Toronto FC by manager Mauro Biello, Drogba refused to play for the team that night, removing his name from the squad. With both his fitness, due to a lingering back injury, and his role in the team in question, Drogba did not travel with the team to, although he was in attendance at, their first postseason match at D.C. United, a 4–2 victory on 27 October. Drogba did not experience the same level of success in his second regular season compared to the first, but still scored 10 goals while appearing in only 22 games, as Montreal reached the Conference Final of the 2016 Playoffs.

=== Phoenix Rising ===
On 12 April 2017, after nearly four months as a free agent and declining a move to Brazilian side Corinthians, Drogba signed for USL side Phoenix Rising FC. He also became a minority owner of the club.

He made his debut for the club on 10 June 2017, and scored a goal and an assist, leading the team to a 2–1 victory over Vancouver Whitecaps FC 2. In July 2017 Drogba attracted attention after scoring an impressive last-minute free kick in a game against Orange County to tie the game. On 7 August, he scored with a powerful 40-yard free kick against LA Galaxy reserve side which was followed by his classic knee-slide goal celebration in front of the bench. In November 2018, at the age of 40, Drogba scored against Orange County as Phoenix won the USL Western Conference. On 8 November, Phoenix lost the USL Championship game 1–0 at Louisville City FC. Drogba retired later that month at the age of 40, but remained with his final club to work on their bid to join MLS.

== International career ==
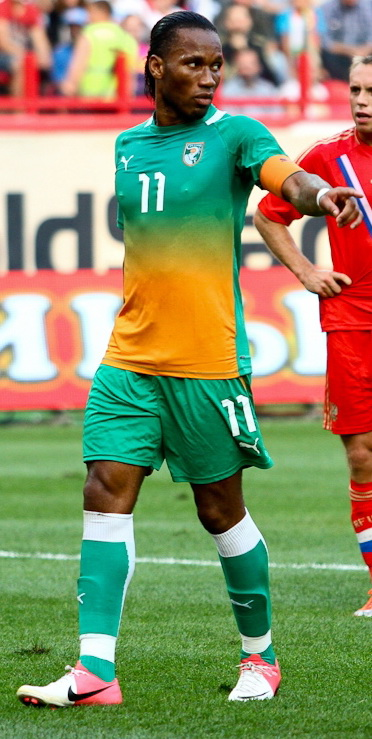
Drogba (pictured playing for the Ivory Coast in 2012) was named captain in 2006.

As the talisman of the team Drogba contributed to the Ivory Coast qualifying for its first ever FIFA World Cup, held in Germany in 2006. Following the victory over Sudan that clinched World Cup qualification he also played a pivotal role in helping to end the Ivorian civil war by making an impassioned speech to the camera which resulted in a cease fire.

In February 2006, Drogba captained the Ivory Coast to their second Africa Cup of Nations final, scoring the only goal in their semi-final match with Nigeria and putting away the deciding spot-kick in their record-tying 12–11 penalty shootout quarter-final win over Cameroon. However, they lost in the final to Egypt 4–2 on penalty kicks after a 0–0 draw, with Drogba's shot being stopped by Egyptian goalkeeper Essam El Hadary.

At the 2006 FIFA World Cup, the Ivory Coast were drawn in a "group of death" with Serbia and Montenegro, the Netherlands and Argentina. On 10 June 2006, Drogba scored the first World Cup goal of his career and of his country's history in the opening game against Argentina, but his team lost 2–1. The Ivory Coast were eliminated from the World Cup after their next game, a 2–1 defeat to the Netherlands, but came from 0–2 down to win against Serbia and Montenegro 3–2 in their final group game, with Drogba watching from the sidelines following suspension after picking up a yellow card in the previous two games.

In the 2008 Africa Cup of Nations, the Ivory Coast were drawn in a group with Nigeria, Mali and underdogs Benin. Drogba scored two goals in the group stage, opening the scoring in the 4–1 win over Benin, as well as in the 3–0 win over Mali. In the quarter-finals, Drogba was on the score sheet once again in the 5–0 win over Guinea with the last four goals coming in the final 20 minutes. The semi-final was a rematch of the 2006 final against Egypt, and Drogba and the Ivory Coast lost 4–1 to the eventual champions. On 9 February, Drogba lost 4–2 to hosts Ghana and thus ended their run in the playoffs.

Drogba scored six goals in five qualification games to help the Ivory Coast qualify for the 2010 FIFA World Cup. In the 2010 Africa Cup of Nations Drogba scored one goal in the 3–1 victory against Ghana in the group stage. The Ivory Coast reached the quarter-finals but lost 2–3 to Algeria. In March 2010, he was named as the 2009 African Footballer of the Year, his second time winning the award in his career.

On 4 June 2010, Drogba was injured in a friendly match with Japan. He received the injury in a high challenge from defender Túlio Tanaka. He fractured the ulna in his right arm and had an operation the next day in the hope of making the finals. On 15 June 2010, Drogba was cleared by FIFA to play in the Ivory Coast's first group game against Portugal wearing a protective cast on his broken arm. The match ended in a goalless draw at the Nelson Mandela Bay Stadium with Drogba coming on in the 65th minute. On 20 June 2010, Drogba became the first player from an African nation to score against Brazil in a World Cup match, scoring with a header in the 78th minute as the Ivory Coast were defeated 1–3. On 25 June 2010, the Ivory Coast went out of the competition despite winning 3–0 against North Korea in their final match.

In the 2012 Africa Cup of Nations, the Ivory Coast were drawn in a group with Sudan, Angola and Burkina Faso. Drogba scored the first goal for his team in the tournament against Sudan and his only goal in the group stage. In the quarter-finals, Drogba scored twice in the 3–0 win over Equatorial Guinea but he missed a penalty kick where he could have scored hat-trick in the match and tournament. He did not score in the semi-final in which the Ivory Coast beat Mali 1–0. In the final against Zambia, Drogba missed a penalty kick in the last 15 minutes of the game, which ended with their loss for the second time by penalty shootout.

In June 2014, Drogba was named in the Ivory Coast's squad for the 2014 FIFA World Cup. He won his 100th international cap in a pre-tournament friendly against Bosnia and Herzegovina, scoring a penalty kick in his side's 2–1 loss on 2 June. In the Ivory Coast's opening match, he appeared as a second-half substitute with the team trailing 1–0 to Japan. Within five minutes of Drogba's arrival, Les Éléphants scored twice to win the match 2–1. On 8 August 2014, Drogba announced his retirement from international football with a record of 65 goals in 105 appearances.

== Player profile ==
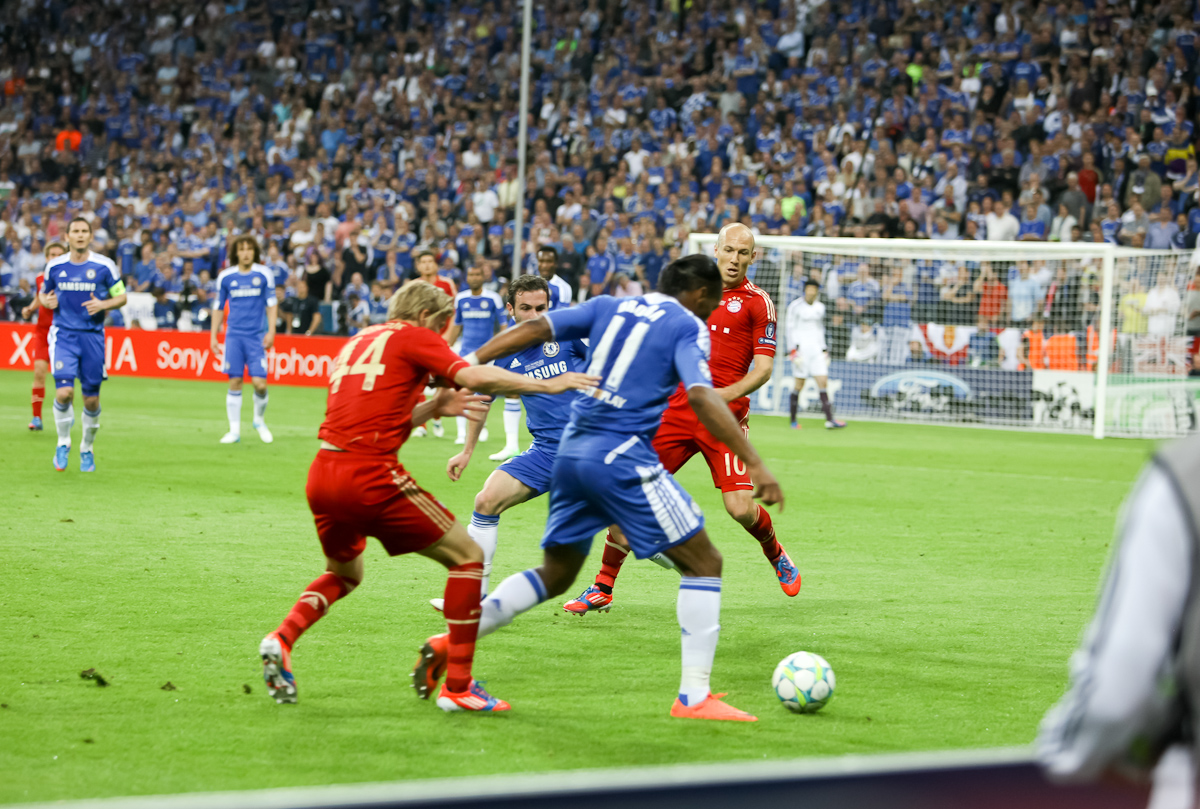
Drogba holding against Bayern Munich during the 2012 UEFA Champions League Final

Drogba made his debut into football at the age of 21, much later than most footballers. He was known for his physical strength, aerial abilities, pace, and most notably, his powerful and accurate strikes. He played as a right-back in his youth due to his ability to hold the ball with his back to goal. He often played as a centre-forward throughout his professional career and is referred to as a "target man" by Martin Li of Bleacher Report. Richard Beech of the Daily Mirror says that his "powerful and intrusive approach made him the lone striker José Mourinho grew to admire, and made it nearly impossible for opposing teams to isolate him and freeze him out of the game." Carl Anka of the BBC writes, "Drogba's robust playing style was so effective that he spearheaded the movement of the Premier League from the 4–4–2 era to a time where [sic] the 4–3–2–1 formation was king."

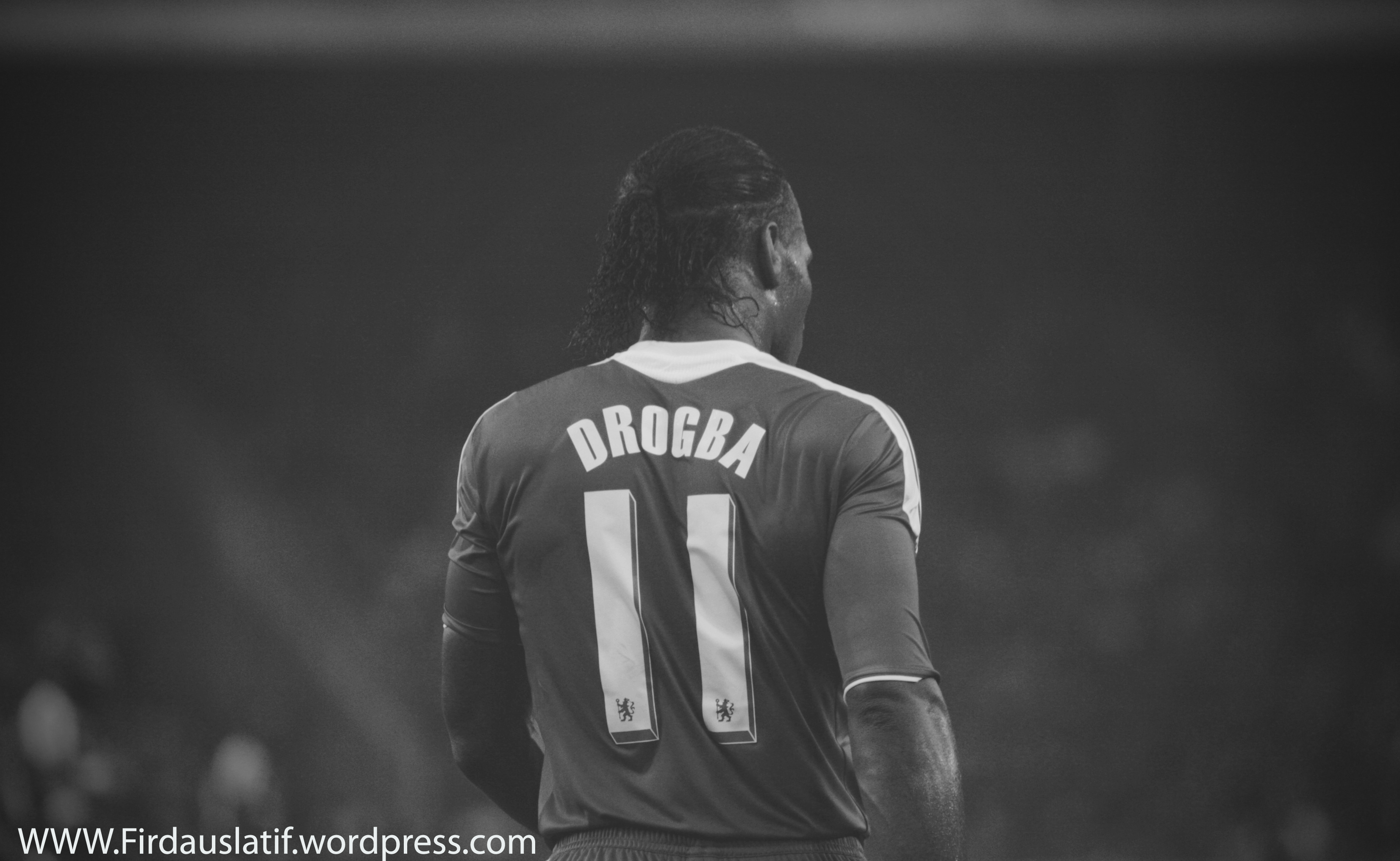
Drogba in 2011 with Chelsea. He wore the number 11 jersey for most of his club and international career.

Drogba is known for performing in big games, with a record of 10 goals in 10 finals and winning 10 trophies. Carl Anka writes, "Local derbies, top four six-pointers, title challenges or cup finals — if the game was big, Drogba got bigger". Drogba was also capable of assisting his teammates. Between the 2009–10 and 2011–12 seasons, he provided 24 assists in the Premier League, with a successful pass rate of 61.4%. He provided a total of 71 assists during his Chelsea tenure.

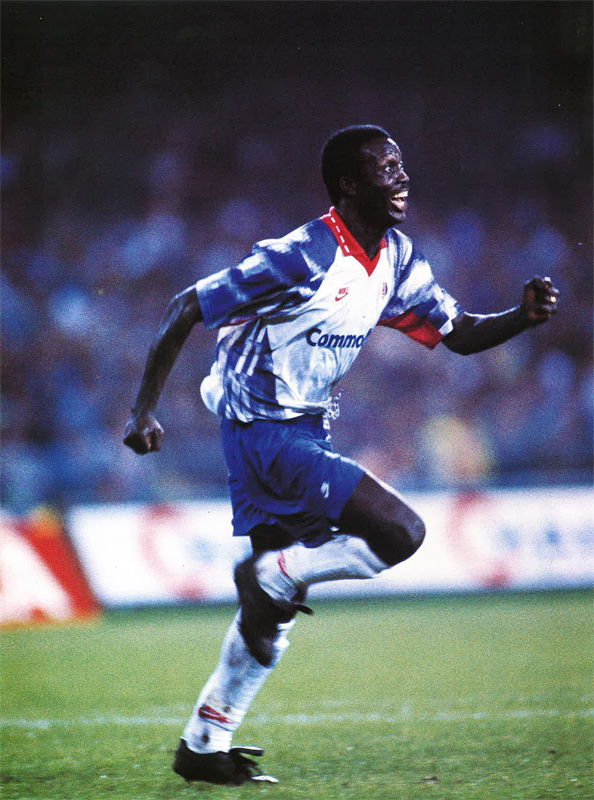
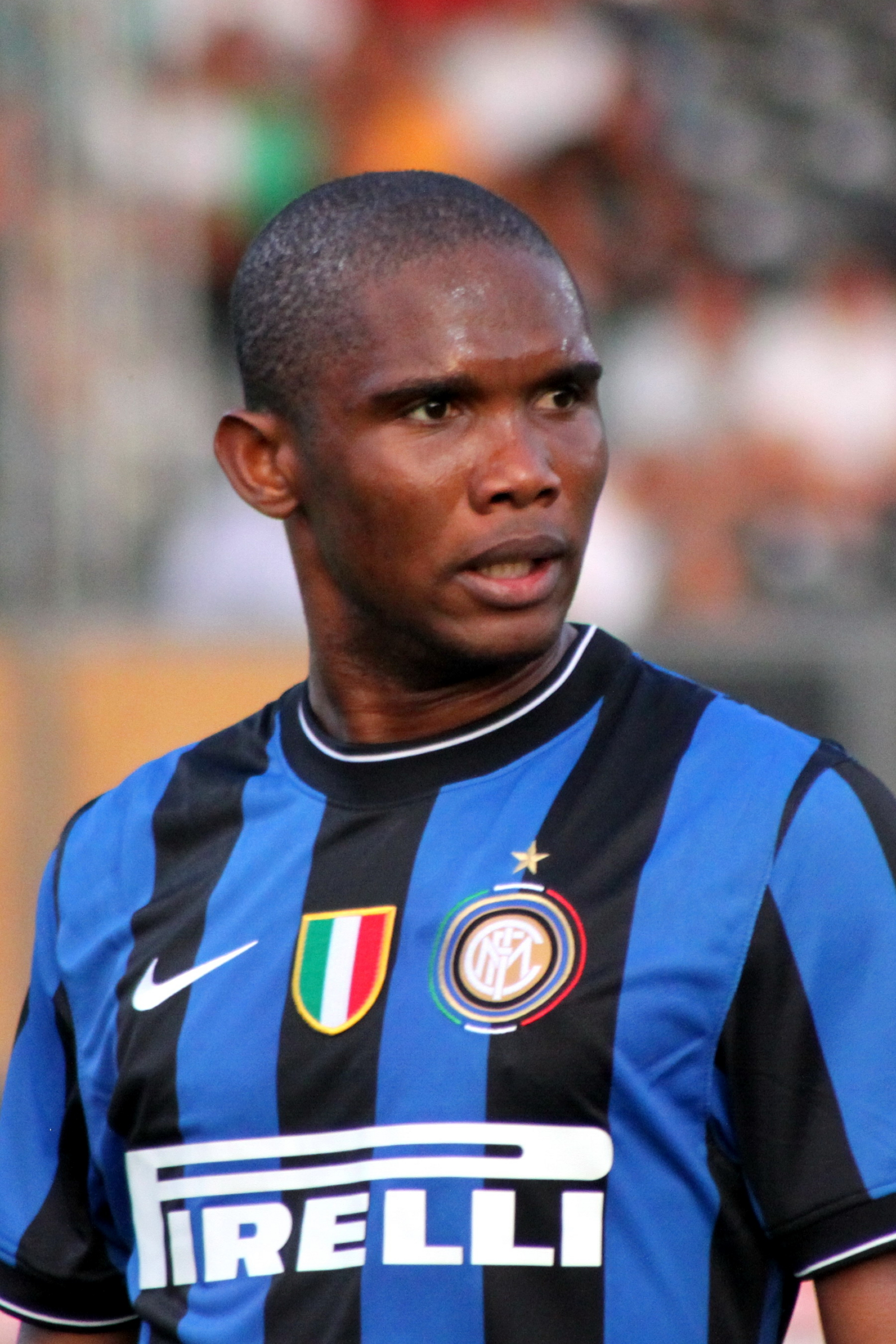
Drogba is often ranked one of the top three greatest African strikers, with George Weah (left) and Samuel Eto'o (right).

Drogba was known for taking free kicks. Dr. Ken Bray of the University of Bath has referred to him as a free kick specialist and said that, "he really just passes the ball very hard". He adds, "He hits it very straight and appears to hit the ball with a very powerful side-foot action, almost like the technique used in a side-foot pass. Drogba's style is about beating the goalkeeper with speed and depth." Bleacher Report states that he used the "knuckleball" technique developed by Juninho Pernambucano. Drogba's trademark goal celebration saw him slide on his knees accompanied with an arm pump and a salute to fans – his celebration appears in EA Sports' FIFA video game.

Drogba is widely regarded as one of the three greatest African strikers alongside George Weah and Samuel Eto'o. Several defenders, including Gerard Piqué, Carles Puyol, Chris Smalling, Nemanja Vidić, and Laurent Koscielny, have stated he is among the toughest forwards they ever faced.

== Outside football ==
=== Personal and family life ===
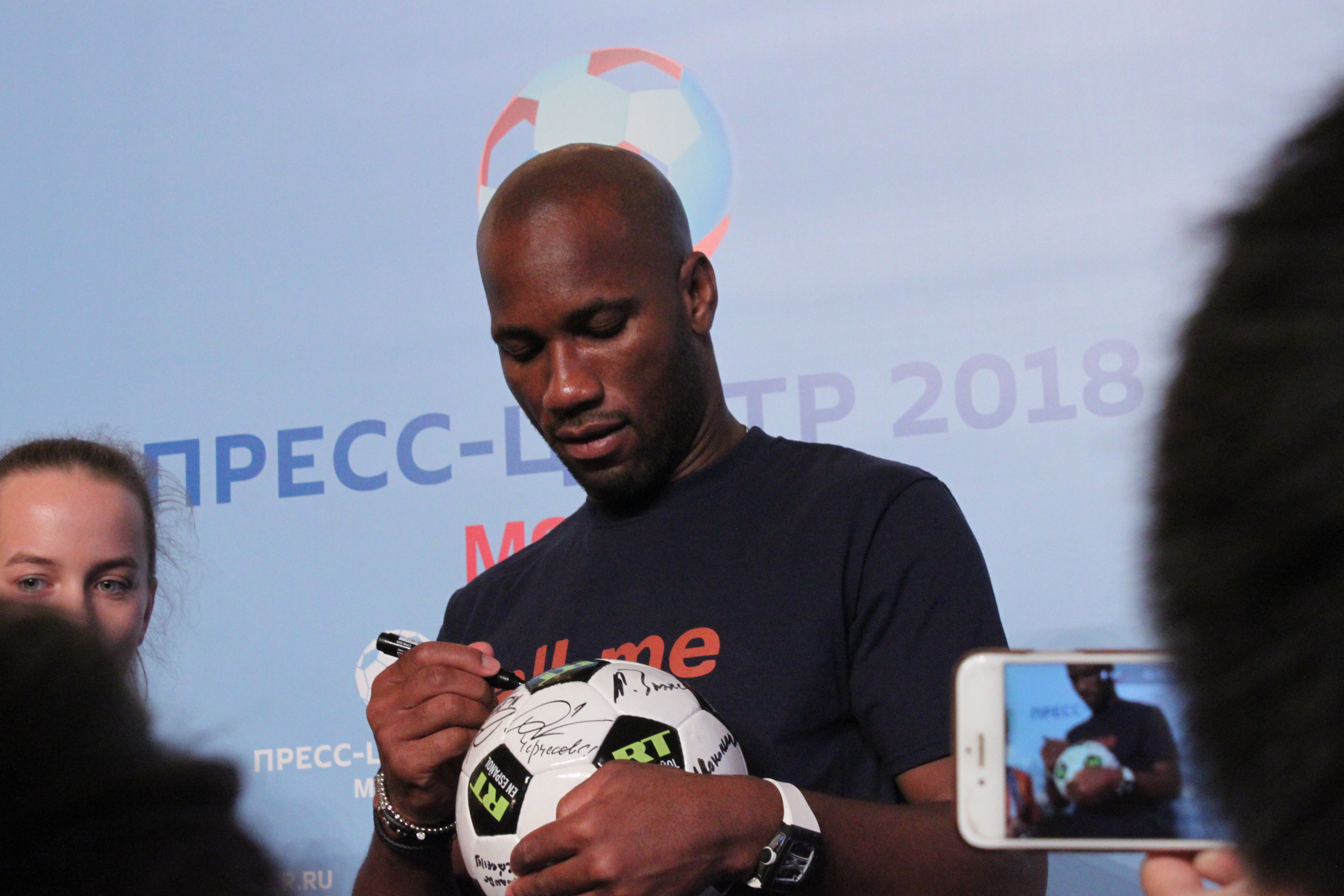
Drogba signing a football at a press conference in Moscow, July 2018

Drogba was married to Lalla Diakité, a Malian woman he met in Paris, and the couple had three children together. His eldest son, Isaac, was born in France in 1999, grew up in England, and played in the Chelsea academy system. He signed for French club Guingamp in February 2018. Drogba has two younger brothers who are also footballers: Joël and Freddy Drogba. Freddy, born in 1992, played in French Ligue 1 side Dijon FCO. He is a devout Roman Catholic. His uncle Michel Goba was a professional footballer and Ivorian international. His cousin Kévin Goba (Michel's son) was also a professional footballer who played in the lower leagues of France. In a statement posted on Instagram in January 2021, Drogba confirmed his divorce with his wife Lalla, saying that they had a mutual agreement. “I'm not in the habit of discussing my private life. But because of speculation in the media today, I can confirm that sadly, after 20 years together, Lalla and I took the difficult decision to separate last year... We remain very close and our main priorities have been to protect our children and our family's private life. May God bless you.”

=== Philanthropy ===
Some players win trophies. Others inspire people. It is not hyperbole to say Didier Drogba did both and helped to end a civil war.

— Carl Anka for the BBC, Didier Drogba was the 'clutch' centre-forward who united a nation.

Drogba is credited with helping bring peace to his country. After the Ivory Coast qualified for the 2006 World Cup by defeating Sudan on 8 October 2005, Drogba made a desperate plea to the combatants, asking them to lay down their arms, a plea which was answered with a ceasefire after five years of civil war. Carl Anka writes, "torn by religious and political tensions, Drogba seized a unifying moment for his country and invited TV cameras into the Elephants changing room where he made a speech to the camera. The man spoke and a nation listened — the elections went off without bloodshed." Drogba helped move an African Cup of Nations qualifier match to the stadium of Bouake, a move that helped confirm the peace process. On 24 January 2007, Drogba was appointed by the United Nations Development Programme (UNDP) as a Goodwill Ambassador. The UNDP were impressed with his charity work and believed that he would help raise awareness on African issues. His involvement in the peace process led to Time magazine naming Drogba one of the world's 100 most influential people for 2010.

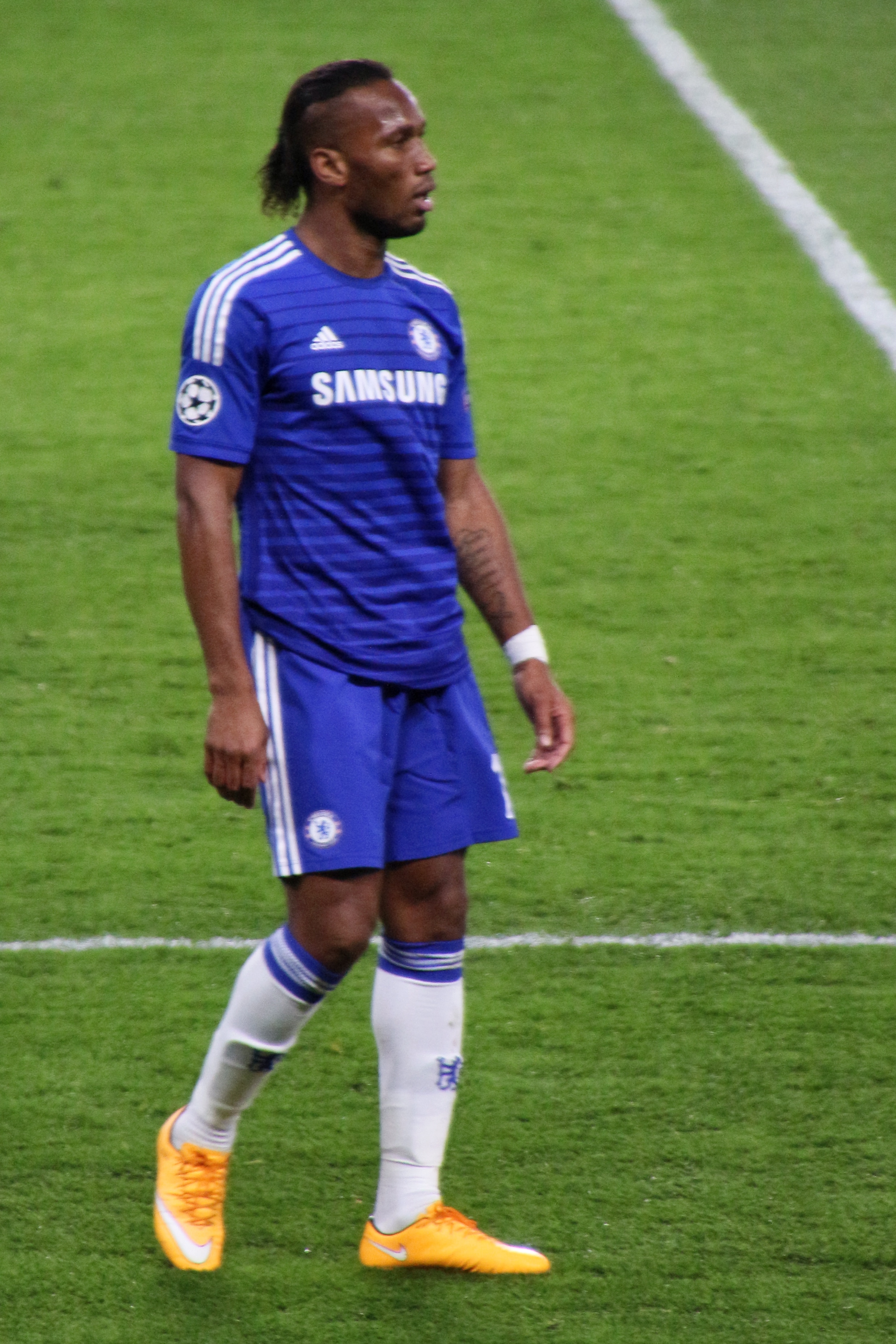
Sponsored by Nike and sporting their Nike Mercurial Vapor boots, Drogba teamed up with Nike and U2 frontman Bono to support an AIDS charity.

Drogba's charity work continued when, in late 2009, he announced he would donate the £3 million signing on fee for his endorsement of Pepsi for the construction of a hospital in his hometown of Abidjan. This work was done through Drogba's recently created "Didier Drogba Foundation" and Chelsea announced they too would donate the fee for the deal toward the Foundation's project. Drogba decided to build the hospital after a trip to Abidjan's other hospitals, saying, "I decided the Foundation's first project should be to build and fund a hospital giving people basic healthcare and a chance just to stay alive." The same year, Drogba teamed up with sportswear company Nike (which sponsors him) and U2 frontman Bono on the eve of World AIDS Day to fight AIDS, tuberculosis and malaria. Drogba said, "It's a big honour and pleasure for me to be linked with Bono and try to help him save some lives. AIDS and HIV is something that really destroyed Africa, and people don't really realise how easy it is to save lives — only two pills a day, which is 40 cents."

In November 2014, Drogba appeared in FIFA's "11 against Ebola" campaign with a selection of top football players from around the world, including Cristiano Ronaldo, Neymar, Gareth Bale and Xavi. Under the slogan "Together, we can beat Ebola", FIFA's campaign was done in conjunction with the Confederation of African Football and health experts, with the players holding up eleven messages to raise awareness of the disease and ways to combat it. On 22 February 2018, Drogba, former AC Milan striker and current Liberia President George Weah, and teenage French prodigy Kylian Mbappé had a meeting with French President Emmanuel Macron and FIFA President Gianni Infantino at the Élysée Palace in Paris that focused on a sports development project in Africa.

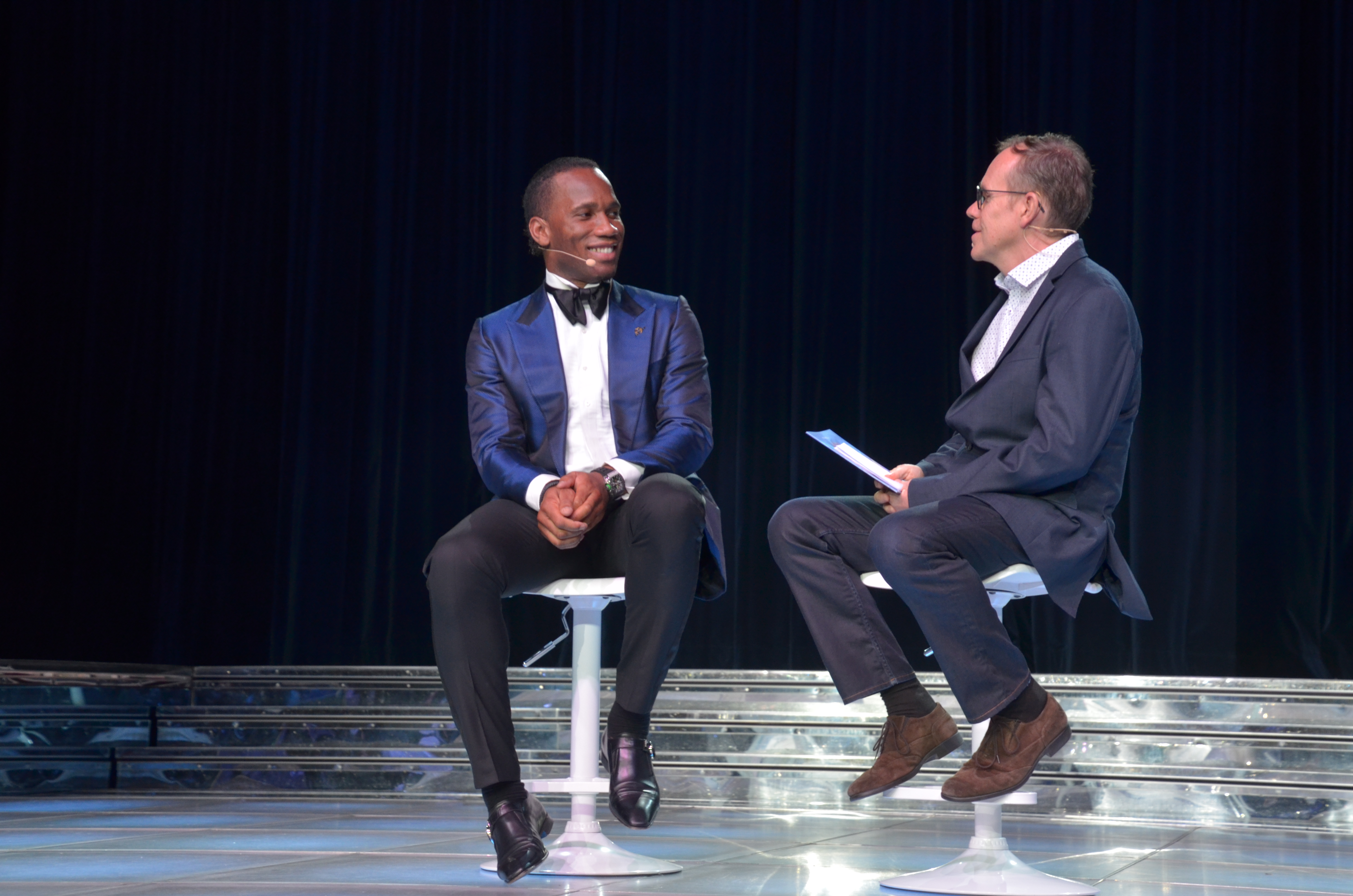
Drogba (left) interviewed during the Peace and Sport international forum in 2017. He was appointed Vice President of the organisation the following year.

As a UNDP Goodwill Ambassador, Drogba has taken part in the annual Match Against Poverty alongside Ronaldo and Zinedine Zidane. He has appeared in the 2012 and 2015 games. Levallois Sporting Club, the amateur club where Drogba began his career, used their percentage of his transfer fees, including £600,000 of the £24 million paid when he joined Chelsea, first to ensure the club's survival, and then to improve their stadium to incorporate modern sports facilities for the benefit of the local community. They named the new stadium Stade Didier Drogba.

In 2018, Drogba was appointed Vice President of Peace and Sport, an independent organisation based in Monaco and under the patronage of Prince Albert II of Monaco that works in areas where people are estranged from one another. In June 2021, he received an honorary degree from RUSTA, due to his contributions to football and to the restoration of peace to his country.

=== Media ===
On 2 December 2019, Drogba co-hosted the 2019 Ballon d'Or ceremony in Paris alongside journalist Sandy Heribert. On 29 November 2021, the duo co-hosted the next ceremony in 2021 which saw Lionel Messi receive the men's award for a record seventh time whilst Alexia Putellas won the Ballon d'Or Féminin. They also hosted the 2022, 2023 and 2024 editions of the award.

== Career statistics ==
=== Club ===
Appearances and goals by club, season and competition
Club	Season	League			National cup (Note: Includes Coupe de France, FA Cup, Turkish Cup, Canadian Championship)		League cup (Note: Includes Coupe de la Ligue, Football League Cup)		Continental		Others		Total	
Club	Season	Division	Apps	Goals	Apps	Goals	Apps	Goals	Apps	Goals	Apps	Goals	Apps	Goals
Le Mans	1998–99	French Division 2	2	0	0	0	0	0	—		—		2	0
Le Mans	1999–2000	French Division 2	30	7	0	0	2	0	—		—		32	7
Le Mans	2000–01	French Division 2	11	0	3	1	0	0	—		—		14	1
Le Mans	2001–02	French Division 2	21	5	1	1	2	1	—		—		24	7
Le Mans	Total		64	12	4	2	4	1	—		—		72	15
Guingamp	2001–02	French Division 1	11	3	0	0	0	0	—		—		11	3
Guingamp	2002–03	Ligue 1	34	17	3	4	2	0	—		—		39	21
Guingamp	Total		45	20	3	4	2	0	—		—		50	24
Marseille	2003–04	Ligue 1	35	19	2	1	2	1	16 (Note: Eight appearances and five goals in UEFA Champions League, eight appearances and six goals in UEFA Cup)	11	—		55	32
Chelsea	2004–05	Premier League	26	10	2	0	4	1	9 (Note: Appearances in UEFA Champions League)	5	0	0	41	16
Chelsea	2005–06	Premier League	29	12	3	1	1	0	7	1	1 (Note: Appearance in FA Community Shield)	2	41	16
Chelsea	2006–07	Premier League	36	20	6	3	5	4	12	6	1	0	60	33
Chelsea	2007–08	Premier League	19	8	1	0	1	1	11	6	0	0	32	15
Chelsea	2008–09	Premier League	24	5	6	3	2	1	10	5	0	0	42	14
Chelsea	2009–10	Premier League	32	29	4	3	2	2	5	3	1	0	44	37
Chelsea	2010–11	Premier League	36	11	2	0	0	0	7	2	1	0	46	13
Chelsea	2011–12	Premier League	24	5	3	2	0	0	8	6	0	0	35	13
Chelsea	Total		226	100	27	12	15	9	69	34	4	2	341	157
Shanghai Shenhua	2012	Chinese Super League	11	8	0	0	—		—		—		11	8
Galatasaray	2012–13	Süper Lig	13	5	0	0	—		4	1	0	0	17	6
Galatasaray	2013–14	Süper Lig	24	10	3	1	—		8	2	1 (Note: Appearance in Turkish Super Cup)	1	36	14
Galatasaray	Total		37	15	3	1	—		12	3	1	1	53	20
Chelsea	2014–15	Premier League	28	4	2	0	5	1	5	2	0	0	40	7
Montreal Impact	2015	MLS	11	11	0	0	—		0	0	3 (Note: Appearances in MLS Cup Playoffs)	1	14	12
Montreal Impact	2016	MLS	22	10	2	1	—		0	0	3	0	27	11
Montreal Impact	Total		33	21	2	1	—		0	0	6	1	41	23
Phoenix Rising	2017	USL	13	9	0	0	—		—		1 (Note: Appearance(s) in USL Playoffs)	1	14	10
Phoenix Rising	2018	USL	8	4	0	0	—		—		4	3	12	7
Phoenix Rising	Total		21	13	0	0	—		—		5	4	26	17
Career total			500	212	43	21	28	12	102	50	16	8	689	303

=== International ===
National Team	Year	Friendlies		International Competition		Total	
National Team	Year	App	Goals	App	Goals	App	Goals
Ivory Coast	2002	0	0	1	0	1	0
Ivory Coast	2003	4	1	3	3	7	4
Ivory Coast	2004	3	3	4	3	7	6
Ivory Coast	2005	3	1	5	6	8	7
Ivory Coast	2006	7	4	8	4	15	8
Ivory Coast	2007	6	3	2	1	8	4
Ivory Coast	2008	2	1	6	3	8	4
Ivory Coast	2009	1	1	5	6	6	7
Ivory Coast	2010	5	2	6	2	11	4
Ivory Coast	2011	2	1	3	4	5	5
Ivory Coast	2012	4	2	10	7	14	9
Ivory Coast	2013	2	1	7	3	9	4
Ivory Coast	2014	3	3	3	0	6	3
Total		42	23	63	42	105	65

== Honours ==
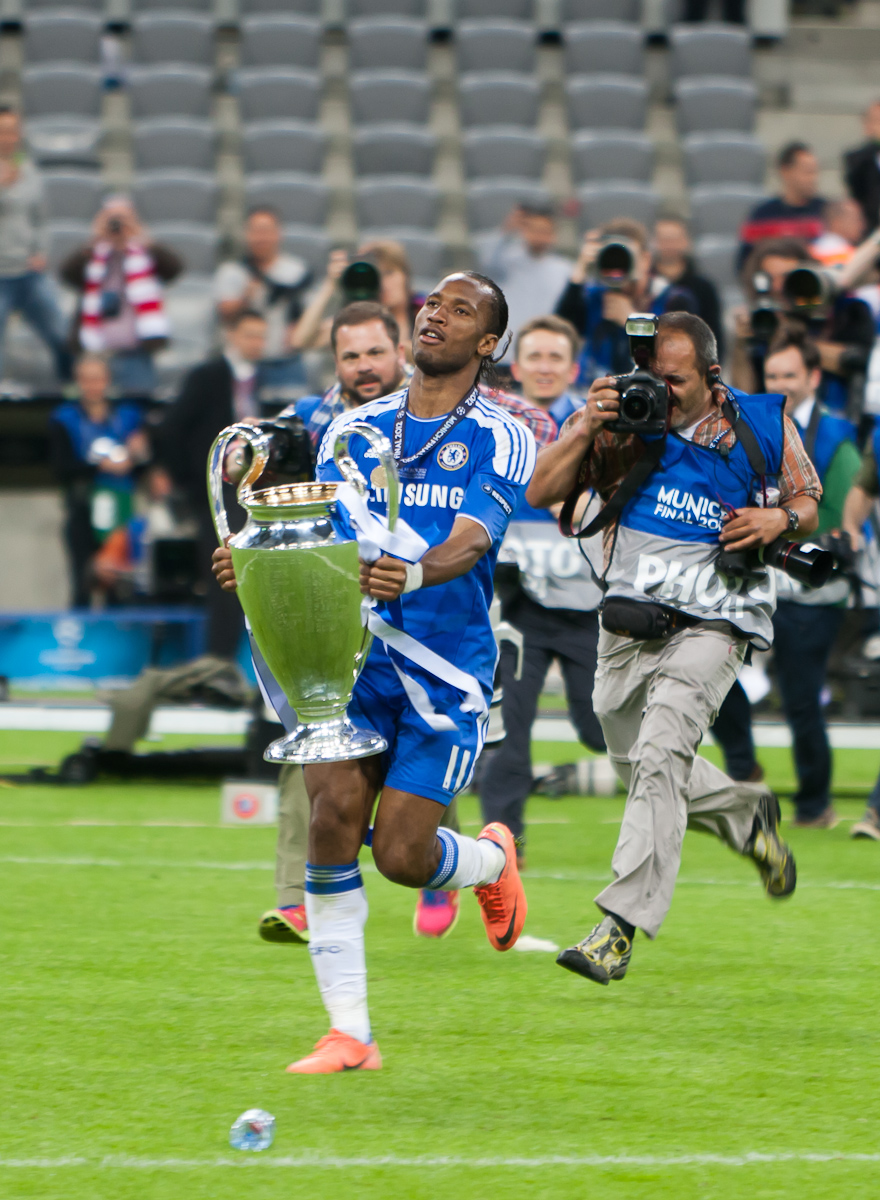
Drogba holding the European Cup following Chelsea's penalty shootout victory over Bayern Munich

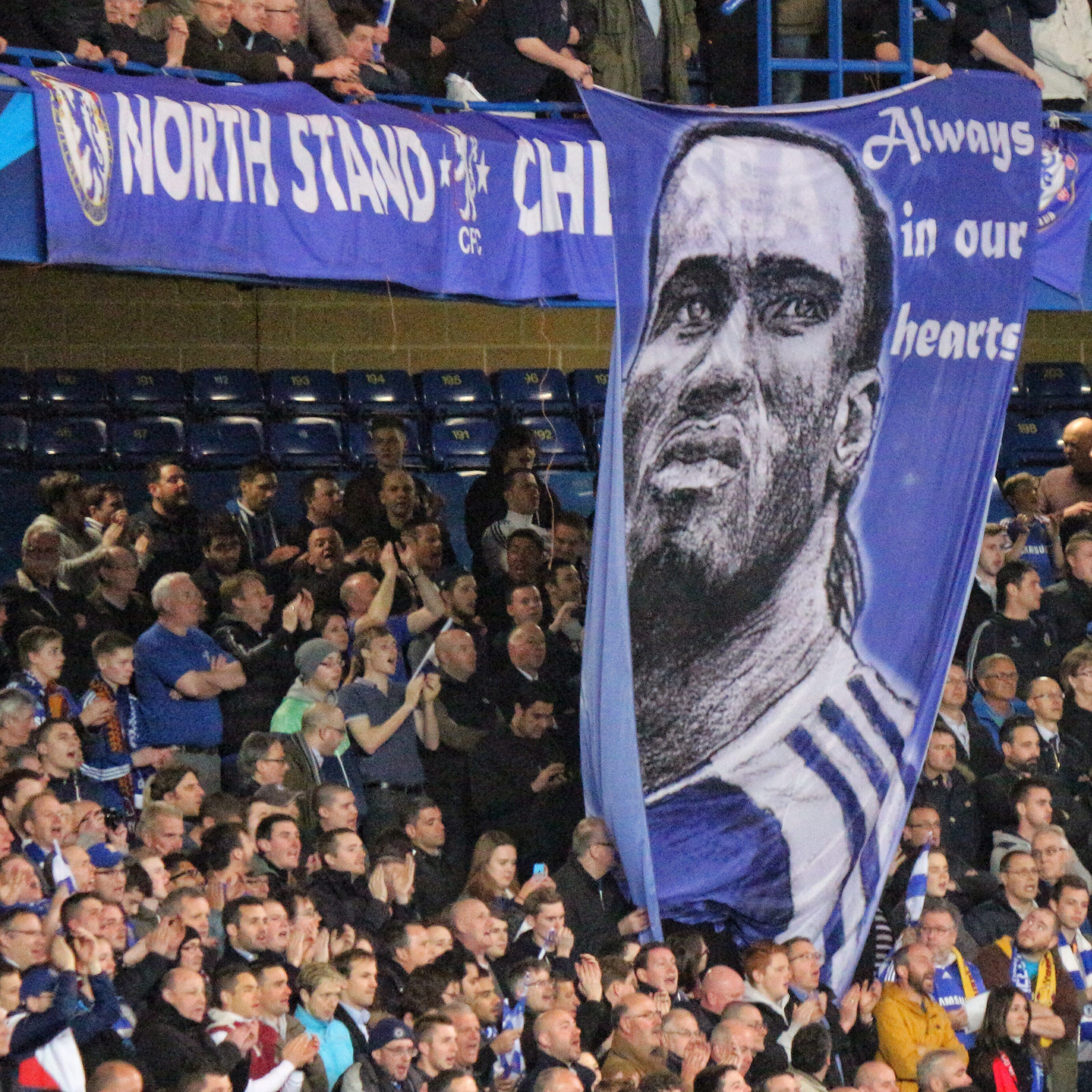
Drogba banner made by Chelsea's fans

Marseille

- UEFA Cup runner-up: 2003–04

Chelsea

- Premier League: 2004–05, 2005–06, 2009–10, 2014–15
- FA Cup: 2006–07, 2008–09, 2009–10, 2011–12
- Football League Cup: 2004–05, 2006–07, 2014–15; runner-up: 2007–08
- FA Community Shield: 2005, 2009
- UEFA Champions League: 2011–12; runner-up: 2007–08

Galatasaray

- Süper Lig: 2012–13
- Turkish Cup: 2013–14
- Turkish Super Cup: 2013

Phoenix Rising

- Western Conference (USL): 2018

Ivory Coast

- Africa Cup of Nations runner-up: 2006, 2012

Individual

- Africa Cup of Nations Team of the Tournament: 2006, 2012
- Africa Cup of Nations Top Scorer: 2012
- African Footballer of the Year: 2006, 2009
- Alan Hardaker Trophy: 2007
- Barclays Spirit of the Game Award: 2015
- BBC African Footballer of the Year: 2009
- BBC Goal of the Month: October 2009
- CAF Team of the Year: 2005, 2006, 2009, 2010, 2012
- Chelsea Players' Player of the Year: 2007
- Chelsea Player of the Year: 2010
- ESM Team of the Year: 2006–07
- FA Community Shield Man of the Match: 2005
- FA Cup Final Man of the Match: 2010
- FIFPro World XI: 2007
- FWA Tribute Award: 2015
- Globe Soccer Awards Off the Pitch Award: 2022
- Golden Foot: 2013
- GQ Sportsman of the Year: 2012
- IFFHS All-time Africa Men's Dream Team: 2021
- Ivory Coast Player of the Year: 2006, 2007, 2012
- Ligue 1 Goal of the Year: 2003–04
- Ligue 1 Player of the Month: January 2004, May 2004
- Ligue 1 Player of the Year: 2003–04
- Ligue 1 Team of the Year: 2003–04
- MLS All-Star: 2016
- MLS Player of the Month: September 2015, October 2015
- Montreal Impact Top Scorer: 2015
- Onze d'Or: 2004
- Onze de Bronze: 2007
- Premier League Golden Boot: 2006–07, 2009–10
- Premier League Hall of Fame: 2022
- Premier League Most Assists: 2005–06
- PFA Team of the Year: 2006–07 Premier League, 2009–10 Premier League
- Time Top 100: 2010
- Turkish Footballer of the Year: 2013
- UEFA Champions League Final Man of the Match: 2012
- UEFA Cup Top Scorer: 2003–04
- UEFA President's Award: 2020
- UEFA Team of the Year: 2007
- UNFP Trophy of Honour: 2019
- West African Footballer of the Year: 2010

== Records ==
=== Chelsea ===
- Most goals scored by a non-English player: 164 goals.
- Most goals scored in Cup Finals: 9 goals.
- Most goals scored in European club competitions: 36 goals.
- Most Premier League hat-tricks: 3 hat-tricks (shared-record).
- Most Premier League goals in a season: 29 goals in 2009–10.
- Most Premier League Golden Boot wins: 2 (2006–07 and 2009–10).
- Most Premier League away goals scored in a season: 15 in 2009–10.
- Most goals in all competitions in a season by a foreign player: 37 goals in 2009–10.
- First player to score a Champions League hat-trick.
- Oldest player to score in the Champions League: 36 years, 8 months, 14 days.

=== Other ===
- Most goals and assists combined for with another player in the Premier League: 36 with Frank Lampard.
- One of seven players to score an opening weekend Premier League hat-trick.
- One of six players to score a hat-trick in consecutive Premier League games.
- The only player score in and win both English domestic cup finals in the same season.
- The only player to score in three League Cup finals.
- The only player to score in four FA Cup finals.
- Most goals scored at the New Wembley Stadium: 8 goals.
- Oldest African goalscorer in the Champions League: 36 years and 259 days old.
- Most appearances in the Champions League by an African player: 94 matches.
- One of eleven players to score hat-tricks for multiple clubs in the Champions League.
- Ivory Coast national team all-time top scorer: 65 goals.

== See also ==
- List of men's footballers with 50 or more international goals
- List of footballers with 100 or more caps
