= Kévin Goba =

French footballer (born 1987)

Personal information
- Date of birth: 6 July 1987 (age 39)
- Place of birth: Saint-Pol-sur-Mer, France
- Height: 1.86 m (6 ft 1 in)
- Position: Forward

Team information
- Current team: AS Villers Houlgate Côte Fleur

Youth career
- 2004–2006: Antony Sports
- 2006–2007: Limoges
- 2007–2010: Vannes

Senior career*
Years	Team	Apps	(Gls)
2010–2012	ES Uzès Pont du Gard	43	(16)
2012–2013	Cherbourg	30	(11)
2013–2014	Dunkerque	9	(0)
2014–2016	Sedan	59	(48)
2016–2019	Châteauroux	19	(1)
2017–2019	Châteauroux II	18	(13)
2019–2021	Saint-Malo	17	(5)
2021–2023	AG Caennaise	36	(19)
2023–2024	AS Villers Houlgate	25	(12)
- * Club domestic league appearances and goals as of 17:55, 1 September 2024 (UTC)

Kévin Goba (born 6 July 1987) is a French professional footballer who most recently played as a striker for Championnat National 3 club AS Villers Houlgate Côte Fleur.

== Career ==
Goba spent the majority of his playing career in the lower divisions of France, with ES Uzès Pont du Gard, and Cherbourg, before transferring to Dunkerque - a club his father also played at. He thereafter had a successful move to CS Sedan Ardennes, and then moved to LB Châteauroux whom he helped promote to the professional Ligue 2. Goba made his professional debut with in a 1–0 Coupe de la Ligue loss to Clermont Foot on 8 August 2017.

== Personal life ==
Goba is the son of the Ivorian footballer Michel Goba, and the cousin of the Ivorian footballer, Didier Drogba.
